= Troy Davis (linebacker) =

American football player (born 1991)

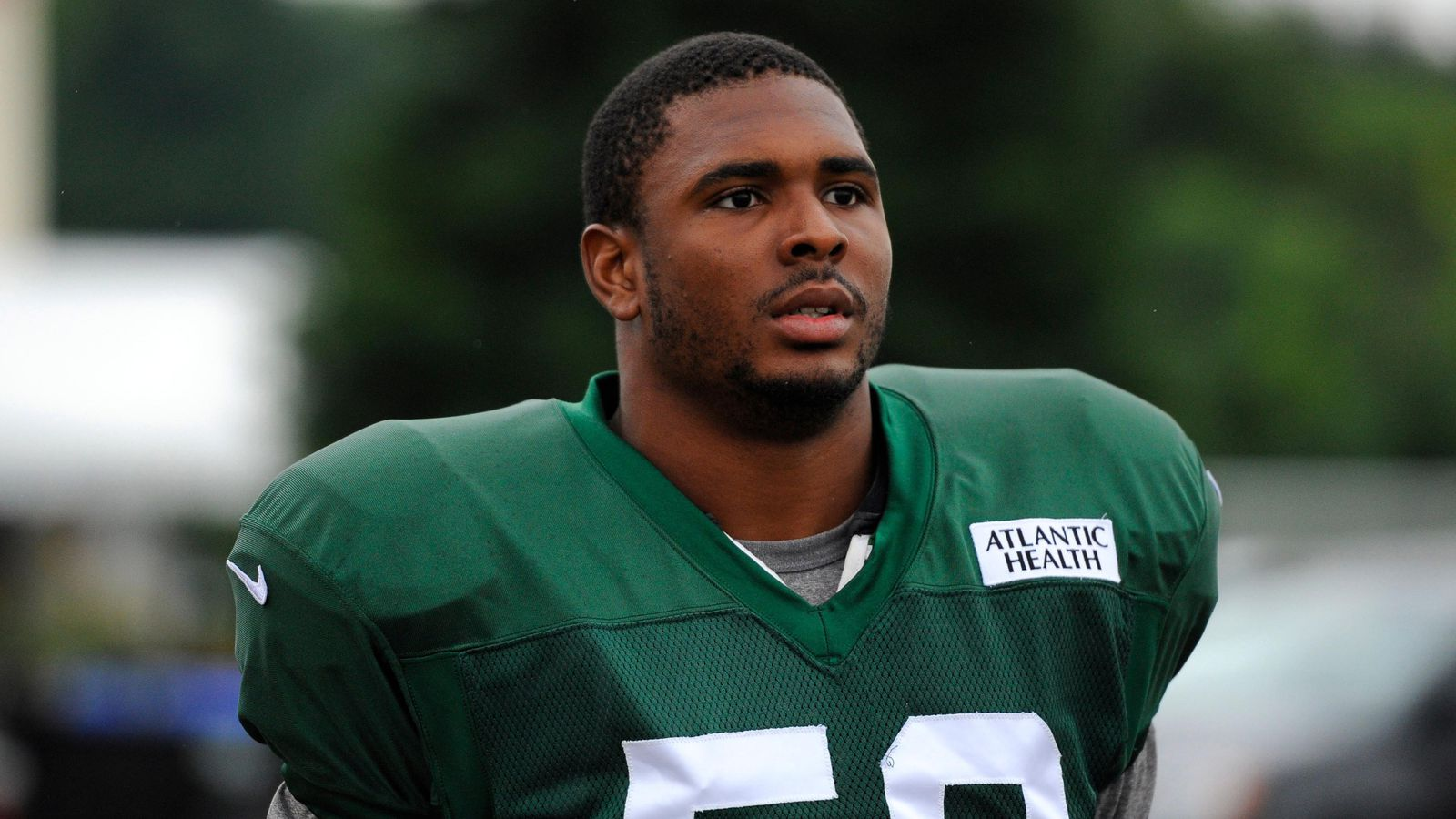

Seckinger High School
- Title: Inside linebackers coach

Personal information
- Born: January 6, 1991 (age 35); Lawrenceville, Georgia, U.S.
- Listed height: 6 ft 2 in (1.88 m)
- Listed weight: 251 lb (114 kg)

Career information
- High school: Lilburn (GA) Berkmar
- College: UCF
- NFL draft: 2013: undrafted

Career history

Playing
- New York Jets (2013); Dallas Cowboys (2014–2015)*; Hamilton Tiger-Cats (2015); Toronto Argonauts (2016–2018)
- * Offseason or practice squad member only

Coaching
- Seckinger High School (2022–present) Inside linebackers coach

Awards and highlights
- Grey Cup champion (2017); First-team All-C-USA (2012)

Career NFL statistics
- Total tackles: 5
- Stats at Pro Football Reference
- Stats at CFL.ca

Troy Michael Davis (born January 6, 1991) is an American former professional football player who was a linebacker in the National Football League (NFL) and Canadian Football League (CFL). He played college football for the UCF Knights before signing with the NFL's New York Jets in 2013 as an undrafted free agent. Davis also spent time in the NFL with the Dallas Cowboys while also having stints with the Hamilton Tiger-Cats and the Toronto Argonauts of the CFL.

== Early life ==
Davis attended Berkmar High School in Lilburn, Georgia. Davis was named Academic Athlete of the Year in 2007. He was an honorable mention pick in his junior season and was a first-team all-county linebacker in his senior year.

== College career ==
=== Freshman season ===
In his freshman season (2009), he appeared in 10 games but didn't record any statistics.

=== Sophomore season ===
In his Sophomore season (2010), he appeared in 14 games in which he recorded 26 Tackles, 5.5 Sacks, a forced fumble, 6 pass deflections and one Interception.

=== Junior season ===
In his Junior season (2011), he recorded 29 Tackles, 5 Sacks, 2 Pass deflections and a forced fumble in 12 regular season games. He was selected to Phil Steele's All-C-USA Third-team following his Junior season.

=== Senior season ===
In his Senior season (2012), he appeared in 14 games in which he recorded 72 Tackles, a career high 8 Sacks, 3 Forced fumbles and 4 Pass deflections. He was selected to both the All-C-USA First-team and Phil Steele's All-C-USA First-team. On December 19, 2012, he was selected as UCF's Outstanding Defensive Lineman at the UCF Football Awards Banquet following his senior season.

== Professional career ==
=== New York Jets ===
On April 27, 2013, Davis signed with the New York Jets as an undrafted free agent. He was released on August 31, 2013 but was signed to the team's practice squad a day later. On September 25, 2013, he was released from the practice squad before being re-signed to the squad on October 2, 2013. Ten days later on October 12, he was promoted to the active roster. Davis made his NFL debut in week 8 of the 2013 season on October 27 against the Cincinnati Bengals. Playing on special teams he recorded two tackles and made a 7-yard kickoff return after collecting a squibber. He was released on August 30, 2014.

=== Dallas Cowboys ===
The Dallas Cowboys signed Davis to their practice squad on October 21, 2014. The Cowboys waived Davis on May 8, 2015.

=== Hamilton Tiger-Cats ===
On September 27, 2015, Davis signed a practice roster agreement with the Hamilton Tiger-Cats of the Canadian Football League. Davis was activated to play in the East Division Final on November 21, 2015, but recorded no stats playing in that game. After signing a contract extension with the Tiger-Cats on December 16, 2015, Davis was released during their training camp on June 15, 2016.

=== Toronto Argonauts ===
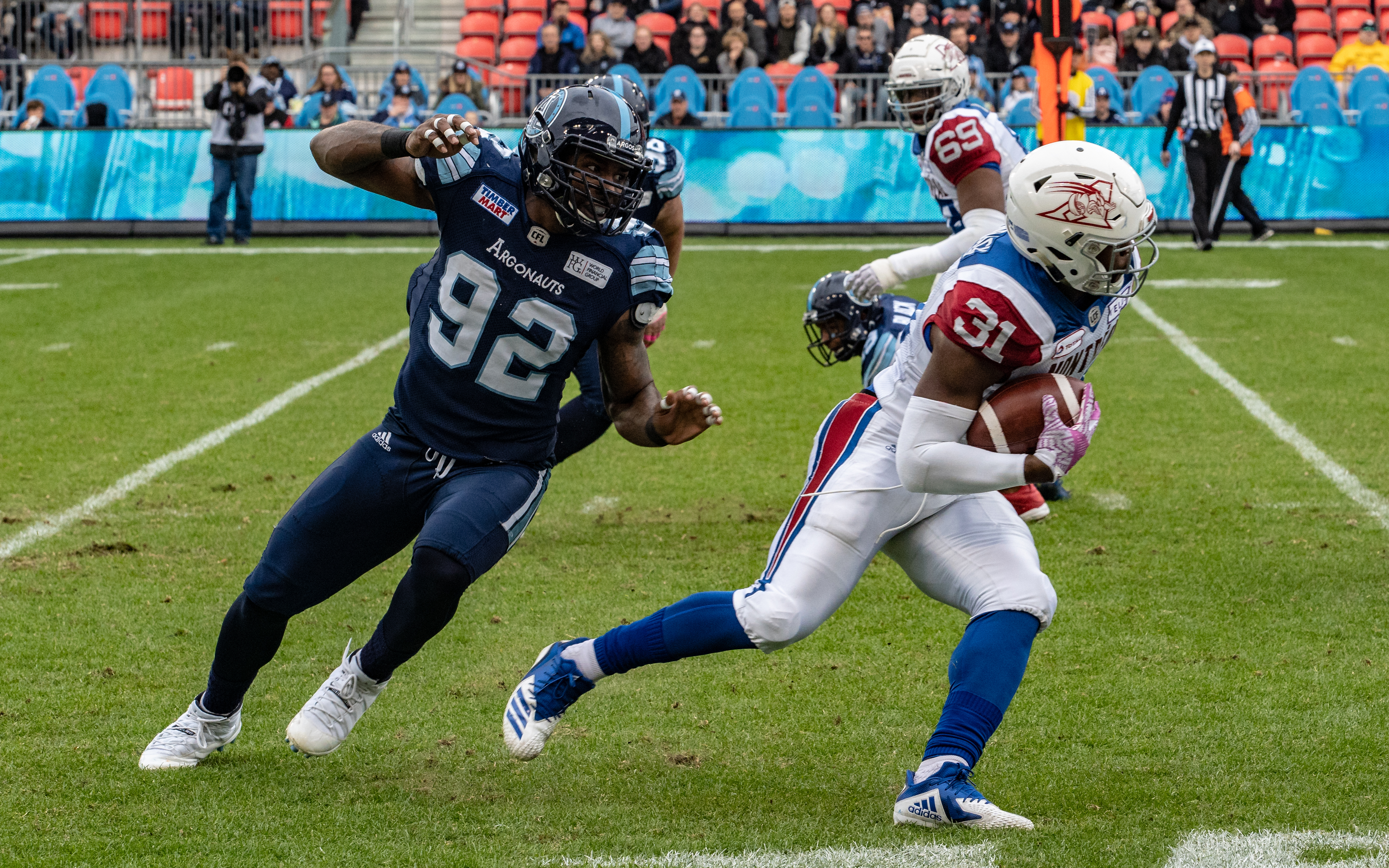
Davis attempts to make a tackle at BMO Field.

On October 7, 2016, Davis signed with the Toronto Argonauts of the Canadian Football League. On November 26, 2017 his Toronto Argonauts won the championship trophy, the Grey Cup, in Ottawa. Davis was released on June 1, 2019. He retired afterwards.

== Coaching career ==
On April 23, 2022 Davis was hired by the Seckinger High School

== Personal life ==
He is the son of Oneal Murphy and Keisha Davis. He majored in sports and exercise science while in college.
