= Discovery High School (Georgia) =

High school in Georgia, United States

Location
- 1335 Old Norcross Road; Lawrenceville, Georgia 30046; United States; 33°57′20″N 84°02′05″W

Information
- School type: Public high school
- Established: 2015
- School district: Gwinnett County Public Schools
- Principal: Robert Maffeo
- Teaching staff: 165.50 (FTE)
- Grades: 9–12
- Enrollment: 2,703 (2024–2025)
- Student to teacher ratio: 16.33
- Colors: Navy, gray, and lime green
- Athletics conference: Georgia High School Association
- Nickname: Titans
- Website: https://www.gcpsk12.org/DiscoveryHS

Discovery High School is a public high school in Lawrenceville, Georgia, United States. The school is operated by Gwinnett County Public Schools. Its only feeder is Richards Middle School.

It was built in 2015 for over $70 million. Its opening provided relief to over crowding at Central Gwinnett High School and Berkmar High School.

As of 2018 it had 2,716 students. That year GCPS acquired land for the Discovery High park facilities using eminent domain.
