= Paul Duke (American football) =

American football player, businessman (1924–2009)

- Born: Paul Anderson Duke; September 24, 1924; DeKalb County, Georgia, U.S.
- Died: March 24, 2009 (aged 84); Austell, Georgia, U.S.
- Education: Georgia Institute of Technology
- Occupations: Businessman, real-estate developer, civic leader
- Known for: Development of Peachtree Corners and Technology Park Atlanta
- Spouse: Jean Fraser Duke

Paul Anderson Duke (September 24, 1924 – March 24, 2009) was an American businessman, real-estate developer, civic leader, and former professional football player. He was a consensus All-American center for the Georgia Tech Yellow Jackets in 1946 and played professionally for the New York Yankees of the All-America Football Conference in 1947. After his football career, Duke pursued a career in industrial management, business, and real-estate development and became closely associated with the development of Peachtree Corners, Georgia, and Technology Park Atlanta.

Duke founded Peachtree Corners, Inc., and was one of the principal organizers of Technology Park Atlanta. His development concept combined residential neighborhoods with commercial and employment areas, with the aim of creating a community in which people could live, work, and play within the same broader area."City History". City of Peachtree Corners."Paul Duke". Georgia Sports Hall of Fame.

== Early life and education ==
Duke was born in DeKalb County, Georgia, on September 24, 1924. He attended Druid Hills High School and Atlanta Boys High School before enrolling at the Georgia Institute of Technology. He earned bachelor's degrees in mechanical engineering and industrial engineering."Who Was Paul Duke?". Gwinnett County Public Schools."Paul Duke Obituary". The Atlanta Journal-Constitution. March 26, 2009.

At Georgia Tech, Duke participated in varsity football and wrestling and was active in the Chi Phi fraternity. He was president of the fraternity and of his senior class."Paul Duke Obituary". The Atlanta Journal-Constitution. March 26, 2009.

Duke maintained a long association with Georgia Tech after graduating. He later received the university's Distinguished Alumni Award in 1982 and its President's Award in 1987."Paul Duke Obituary". The Atlanta Journal-Constitution. March 26, 2009.

== College football ==
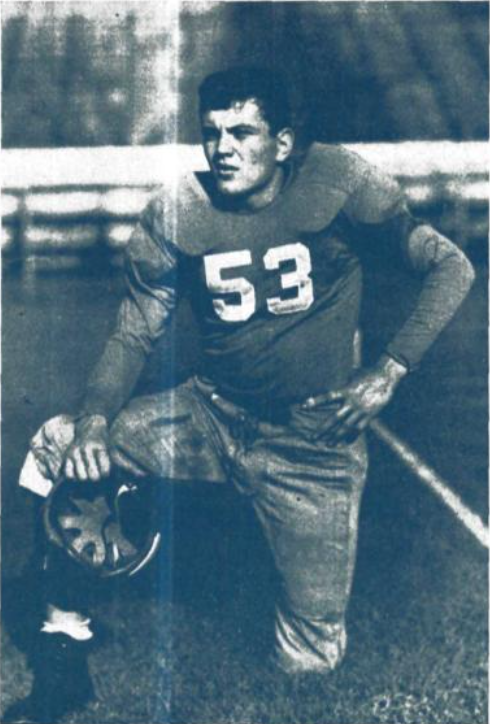
Paul Duke in his Georgia Tech football uniform, c. 1945

Duke played center for Georgia Tech under head coach Bobby Dodd. He was captain of Dodd's first Georgia Tech team in 1945 and was an All-American center in 1946."Paul Duke Parkway — Designated" (PDF). Georgia State Transportation Board. February 18, 1999.

During the 1946 season, Duke was selected first-team All-Southeastern Conference by both the Associated Press and United Press. He was also selected first-team All-American by the Associated Press, United Press, American Football Coaches Association, and Grantland Rice's selection published in Collier's."The Georgia Tech Alumnus, January–February 1947". Georgia Institute of Technology.

Duke was a consensus All-American in 1946. Georgia Tech's contemporary publications praised his offensive and defensive play, and he was recognized by the Atlanta Touchdown Club, along with Georgia's Charley Trippi, as one of the most valuable players in Dixie."The Georgia Tech Alumnus, January–February 1947". Georgia Institute of Technology.

Duke was inducted into the Georgia Tech Athletics Hall of Fame in 1963."Georgia Tech Athletics Hall of Fame". Georgia Tech Athletics.

== Professional football ==
Duke was selected by the New York Giants in the fourth round, 30th overall, of the 1946 NFL draft. He was subsequently selected by the San Francisco 49ers in the third round, 22nd overall, of the 1947 AAFC draft."1947 AAFC draft". Wikipedia.

Duke instead played professional football for the New York Yankees of the All-America Football Conference during the 1947 season. He played center and linebacker and appeared in 10 games."Paul Duke". Pro-Football-Reference.

The Yankees finished the 1947 regular season with an 11–2–1 record and won the AAFC Eastern Division before losing the AAFC Championship Game to the Cleveland Browns. Duke was listed on the Yankees' roster at 6 feet 1 inch and 210 pounds."1947 New York Yankees". Pro-Football-Reference.

After the 1947 season, Duke ended his professional football career and returned to Georgia."Paul Duke, 84, built Peachtree Corners". The Atlanta Journal-Constitution. March 2009.

== Business career ==
After football, Duke joined the Atlantic Steel Company, where he worked in retail sales, engineering, and production for eight years."Paul Duke Obituary". The Atlanta Journal-Constitution. March 26, 2009.

In 1955, Duke organized the Southern Division of the L. B. Foster Company. He moved the division headquarters to Gwinnett County in 1958 and was chief executive officer of the division and as vice president and director of the parent company until 1968."Paul Duke Parkway — Designated" (PDF). Georgia State Transportation Board. February 18, 1999.

Duke's experience in industrial management and his interest in the growth of Gwinnett County led him toward real-estate development. In the late 1960s, he began pursuing a vision for a planned community that would combine residential development with technology-oriented employment."Technology Park/Atlanta". Georgia Institute of Technology.

In 1968, Duke formed Peachtree Corners, Inc. and began developing the concept that became the planned community of Peachtree Corners. He also played a pivotal role in organizing Technology Park/Atlanta."City History". City of Peachtree Corners."Paul Duke Obituary". The Atlanta Journal-Constitution. March 26, 2009.

== Development of Peachtree Corners ==
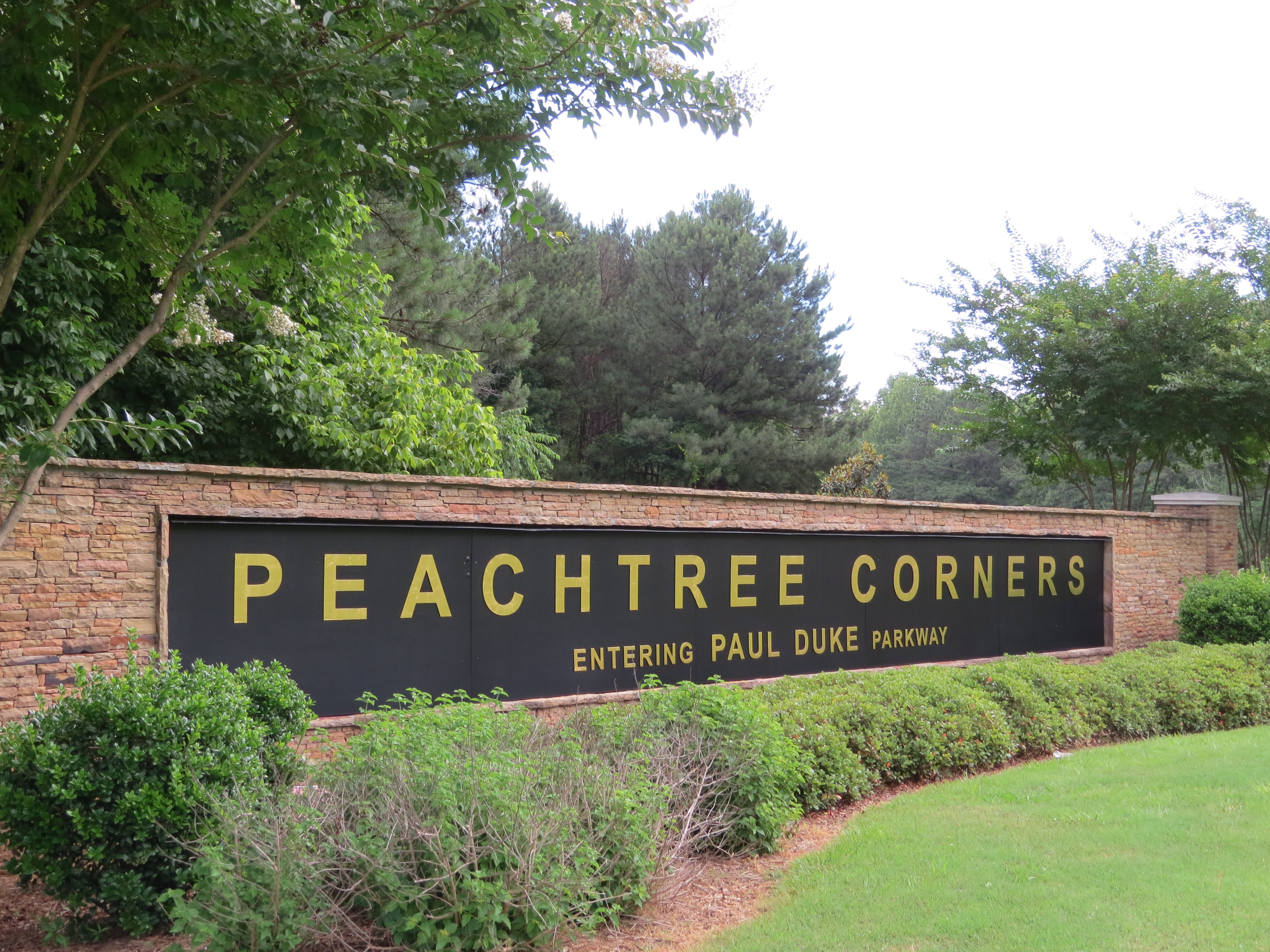
Gateway to Peachtree Corners at Peachtree Boulevard and Peachtree Parkway

In the late 1960s, Duke proposed developing a planned community in western Gwinnett County, in an area then known as Pinckneyville. He envisioned a community where people could live, work, and play within the same general area, reducing the need for long commutes."City History". City of Peachtree Corners.

Duke began planning the office component of the development in 1967 and established Peachtree Corners, Inc. in 1968. His vision included a planned environment combining residential neighborhoods with a technology-oriented business center."City History". City of Peachtree Corners."Technology Park/Atlanta". Georgia Institute of Technology.

The planned community incorporated residential neighborhoods with commercial and office development. Duke's original concept was subsequently implemented and expanded by other developers, builders, businesses, planners, and community leaders. The city's history identifies developer Jim Cowart as an important figure in the later development of residential neighborhoods, beginning with Spalding Corners."City History". City of Peachtree Corners.

Duke consequently became known as the "Father of Peachtree Corners." His role was as the founder and originator of the planned-community vision, while later developers and community leaders carried out and expanded many portions of the development."Who Was Paul Duke?". Gwinnett County Public Schools.

== Technology Park Atlanta ==
An important component of Duke's development strategy was the creation of a technology-oriented employment center. In 1967, he initiated planning for Technology Park/Atlanta, a campus of low-rise buildings designed to attract high-technology and engineering companies to Gwinnett County."City History". City of Peachtree Corners.

Duke's interest in technology employment was closely connected to Georgia Tech. One goal of the technology park was to create engineering and technology employment opportunities that could encourage Georgia Tech graduates to remain in Georgia rather than leave the state for jobs elsewhere."Who Was Paul Duke?". Gwinnett County Public Schools.

As a member of the Georgia Tech National Advisory Board, Duke helped raise approximately $1.7 million to develop the business center. The project was intended to support both regional economic development and Georgia Tech."City History". City of Peachtree Corners.

Technology Park Atlanta eventually became a major office and technology center in the northeastern Atlanta metropolitan area. Early tenants included General Electric, Scientific Atlanta, and Hayes Microcomputer Products."City History". City of Peachtree Corners.

The technology park became an important employment center for the surrounding community and contributed to Peachtree Corners' later identity as a technology-oriented suburban city. By the 21st century, the park remained an important part of the city's economic base."Economic Development Plan, 2023–2028". City of Peachtree Corners.

== Civic activities ==
Duke was active in business and civic organizations in the Atlanta and Gwinnett County areas.

He held leadership positions with organizations including the Atlanta Chamber of Commerce, Atlanta Rotary Club, and Georgia Tech Foundation. He was president of the Gwinnett Chamber of Commerce, was the founding president of the Community Foundation for Northeast Georgia, and was chairman of the Teachers-as-Leaders program in Gwinnett County Public Schools."Paul Duke Obituary". The Atlanta Journal-Constitution. March 26, 2009.

Duke was also involved in banking organizations in Gwinnett County and elsewhere in Georgia. A 1999 Georgia State Transportation Board resolution recorded his work as an officer of Buford Commercial Bank, Bank of Norcross, Gwinnett Bank and Trust Company, Heritage Bank, Commercial Bank of Georgia, Commercial Bank of Gwinnett, and the Metro Atlanta Board of Colonial Bank."Paul Duke Parkway — Designated" (PDF). Georgia State Transportation Board. February 18, 1999.

Duke was also involved in the Georgia Tech Foundation and remained active in the university's affairs throughout his later life. He was chairman emeritus of Peachtree Corners, Inc. at the time of his death."Georgia Tech Foundation 2009 Annual Report". Georgia Institute of Technology.

== Honors and awards ==
Duke received numerous awards and honors for his professional, athletic, and civic contributions."Paul Duke Parkway — Designated" (PDF). Georgia State Transportation Board. February 18, 1999.

- Georgia Tech Athletics Hall of Fame, 1963
- Georgia Tech Distinguished Alumni Award, 1982
- Gwinnett County Citizen of the Year, 1985
- Georgia Tech President's Award, 1987
- Georgia Tech Former Student Athlete Total Person Award, 1991
- Georgia Sports Hall of Fame, 1993
- Button Gwinnett Award, 1996
- Georgia Tech Engineering Hall of Fame

== Legacy ==
Duke's most enduring public legacy is associated with Peachtree Corners and Technology Park Atlanta. Local and educational sources identify him as the founder of Peachtree Corners, Inc. and describe him as the "Father of Peachtree Corners.""Who Was Paul Duke?". Gwinnett County Public Schools.

Duke's development concept preceded the incorporation of the City of Peachtree Corners by more than four decades. Residents voted to establish the city in 2011, and municipal operations began on July 1, 2012."Welcome to Peachtree Corners". City of Peachtree Corners.

The community subsequently developed into a technology-oriented suburban city. Technology Park remained a major employment center, while later economic-development initiatives expanded upon the area's technology-oriented identity."Economic Development Plan, 2023–2028". City of Peachtree Corners.

Duke's legacy is therefore associated with both the physical development of Peachtree Corners and an economic-development strategy that connected residential development with technology-oriented employment.

=== Paul Duke Parkway ===
In 1999, the Georgia State Transportation Board designated a section of Georgia State Route 141 as Paul Duke Parkway. The resolution, adopted February 18, 1999, named the section from Jimmy Carter Boulevard to the Gwinnett County line in Duke's honor."Paul Duke Parkway — Designated" (PDF). Georgia State Transportation Board. February 18, 1999.

The resolution cited Duke's education at Georgia Tech, football career, industrial and business career, development of Peachtree Corners, organization of Technology Park Atlanta, and civic contributions among the reasons for the designation."Paul Duke Parkway — Designated" (PDF). Georgia State Transportation Board. February 18, 1999.

=== Paul Duke STEM High School ===
In June 2016, the Gwinnett County Public Schools Board of Education approved the name Paul Duke STEM High School for a new high school in the Norcross Cluster. The school opened in 2018 on Peachtree Industrial Boulevard in the Technology Park area of what is now Peachtree Corners."Who Was Paul Duke?". Gwinnett County Public Schools."Gwinnett Schools names new high school after Paul Duke". The Atlanta Journal-Constitution. June 19, 2017.

The school was named in Duke's honor because of his connections to engineering, technology, business, education, and the development of Peachtree Corners. Gwinnett County Public Schools describes Duke as a real-estate developer who founded Peachtree Corners, Inc. and was one of the organizers of Technology Park."Who Was Paul Duke?". Gwinnett County Public Schools.

The school was established by Gwinnett County Public Schools decades after Duke's death and was named in his honor.

=== Legacy in Peachtree Corners ===
Duke's original vision for Peachtree Corners continued to influence the community after his death. The city has continued to identify Technology Park and its technology-oriented economy as central elements of Peachtree Corners' identity."Economic Development Plan, 2023–2028". City of Peachtree Corners.

The development evolved substantially beyond Duke's original plans as later developers, businesses, and civic leaders expanded the residential and commercial portions of the community. Nevertheless, the combination of residential neighborhoods, employment centers, and technology-oriented economic development remained central to the area's identity."City History". City of Peachtree Corners.

== Death ==
Paul Anderson Duke died on March 24, 2009, at the age of 84. He died at Presbyterian Village in Austell, Georgia. His death was reported by the Atlanta Journal-Constitution, which described his decades of business activity in Gwinnett County and his role in the development of Peachtree Corners."Paul Duke Obituary". The Atlanta Journal-Constitution. March 26, 2009.

He was survived by his wife, Jean Fraser Duke, four children, eight grandchildren, and three great-grandchildren."Paul Duke Obituary". The Atlanta Journal-Constitution. March 26, 2009.

== See also ==
- Peachtree Corners, Georgia
- Technology Park Atlanta
- Georgia Tech Yellow Jackets football
- Georgia Sports Hall of Fame
- Paul Duke STEM High School
