= Archer High School =

Public high school near Lawrenceville, Georgia, United States

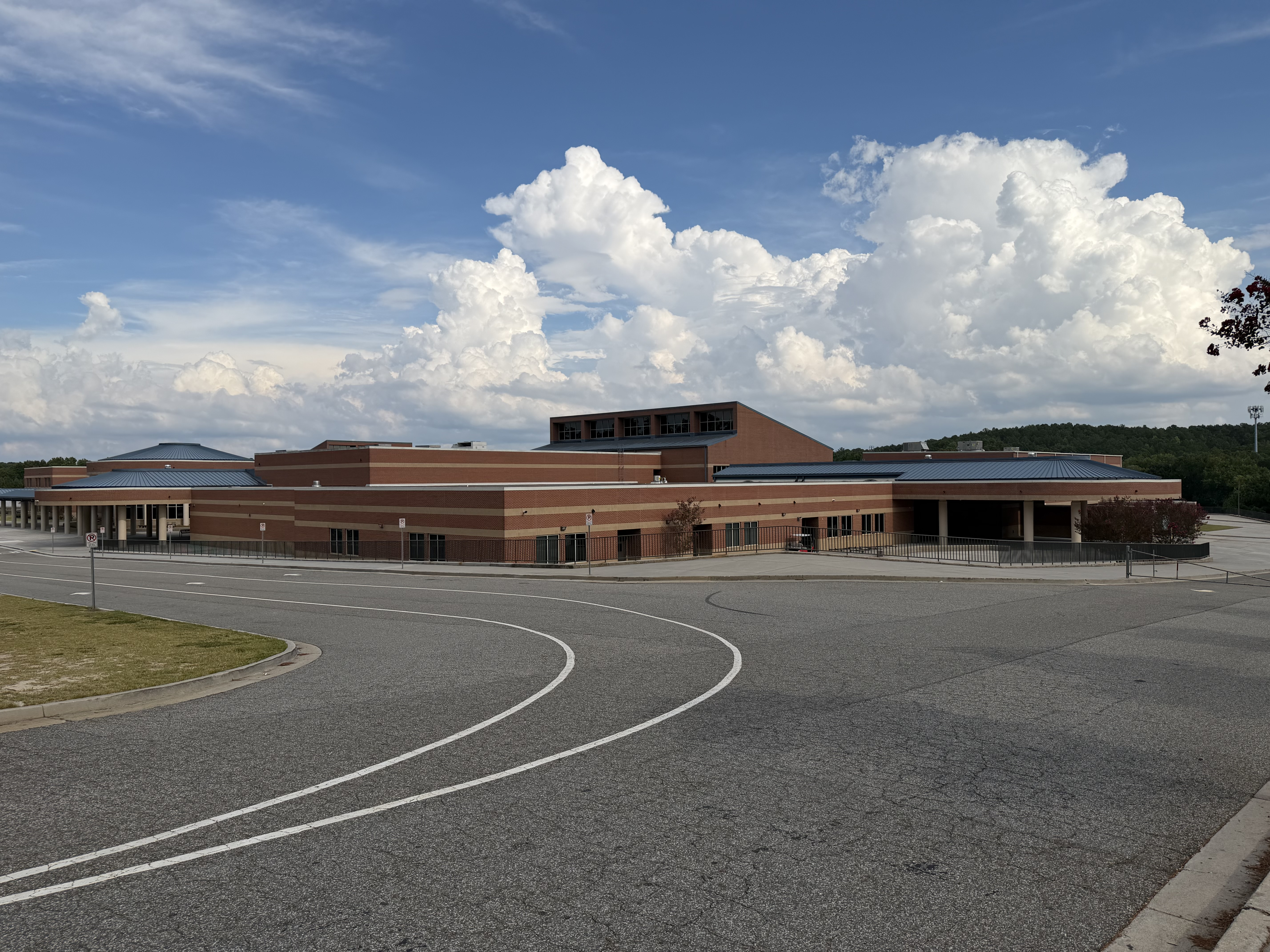

Location
- 2255 New Hope Road; Lawrenceville, Georgia, 30045; United States; 33°54′58″N 83°53′37″W

Information
- School type: Public
- Motto: "I Am Archer, You Are Archer, We Are Archer"
- Established: 2009
- School district: Gwinnett County Public Schools
- Principal: Conquisha Thompson
- Staff: 159.60 (FTE)
- Grades: 9–12
- Enrollment: 3,073 (2023–2024)
- Student to teacher ratio: 19.25
- Colors: Red, silver, and white
- Mascot: Tiger
- Newspaper: Eye of the Tiger
- Website: www.archerhighschool.net

Archer High School is a public high school near Lawrenceville, Georgia, United States. It is operated by Gwinnett County Public Schools. It is named after Gwinnett County teacher and coach Benjamin Vernon Archer.

The school officially opened on Monday, August 10, 2009, with enrollment topping 1,200 students. It was opened as a relief for surplus students from Grayson High School, Central Gwinnett High School, and Dacula High School. Archer is fed by Harbins Elementary, Cooper Elementary, Lovin Elementary, McConnell Middle. As of the 2015–2016 school year the school had an enrollment of 2,568 students.

== In The News ==
In 2016, Archer High School gained notoriety for a period of racial tension following inflammatory comments on social media and a student displaying a confederate flag on campus. The incident resulted in 850 student absences and prompted a sit-in during the pledge of allegiance.

== Athletics ==
In its first year (2009–2010) Archer High School competed in Region 8-AAA of the Georgia High School Association (GHSA), with varsity teams in all sports, except football due to GHSA rules. For the 2010–2011 school year, Archer entered GHSA Region 8-AAAAA, and was the school's first year with a varsity football season. Archer has had many teams compete in state tournaments: girls' track and cross-country, varsity competition cheerleading, wrestling, swimming, girls' softball, girls' basketball, men's basketball, men's tennis, men's track and cross country, volleyball, and football.

In 2012, the softball team became the first program at Archer to win a team state title.

Archer has won many state titles in wrestling. The wrestling team won four consecutive dual team and state tournament titles from 2013–2016. In 2014, the wrestling team finished the season ranked #9 in the nation by WIN Magazine.

== Clubs ==
Archer High School recognizes multiple school-sponsored clubs. These clubs include a dance team, various quiz bowl-like clubs covering different academic areas, multiple honor societies, assorted foreign language clubs, a speech and debate team, a Skills USA club, a creative writing club, chapters of Future Business Leaders of America and Family, Career and Community Leaders of America, Archer's student council, and a yearbook club.

== Notable alumni ==
- Andrew Booth Jr., NFL cornerback
- Joshua Ezeudu, NFL offensive tackle
- Aleem Ford, professional basketball player
- Curtis Terry, MLB first baseman
- Colby Wooden, NFL defensive tackle
