= Hooper-Renwick School =

Historic Black High School

Coordinates: 33.9509°N 83.9847°W

The Hooper-Renwick School is located in Lawrenceville, Georgia, and was Gwinnett County, Georgia's only black public high school in the 1950s to 1960s, until the end of segregated education in the county. Hull Elementary was the county's only Black elementary school during this same time period. The Hooper-Renwick School merged with the Gwinnett County School system in the 1960s and has since served a variety of other purposes within the Gwinnett County Public School System. The building has now been transformed into a library and Black history museum.

== History ==
The Gwinnett County Public School System was created in 1870 and the Lawrenceville Public School System was created in 1893., with the two systems consolidating in 1948. There were a number of Black public and parochial schools in the county's history, however beginning in the late 1910s there was a movement throughout the school system to consolidate schools and resources, maintaining a segregated system. In 1951 there were 13 public schools in Gwinnett County for Black students, all of which were considered "substandard." After consolidation, there remained two newly built buildings that served all Black students in the county: Hooper-Renwick High School and Hull Elementary. Gwinnett County passed a bond in 1955 which funded $130,158 for the construction of the current 18-room Hooper-Renwick School Building.

The Hooper-Renwick School dates back to 1871 on Honeysuckle Street in Lawrenceville. It originally served elementary students and was called Lawrenceville Elementary. In 1943 it was relocated to its current location an enlarged from one room to three. In 1945 it was renamed and began to serve all grade levels, first through twelve, in a twelve room building on 15 acres. The school was named for to prominent members of the local Black community: "Uncle" Mack Renwick, an educational advocate who helped fund the school, and Marshall Hooper, the school's principal.

=== Students and Teachers ===
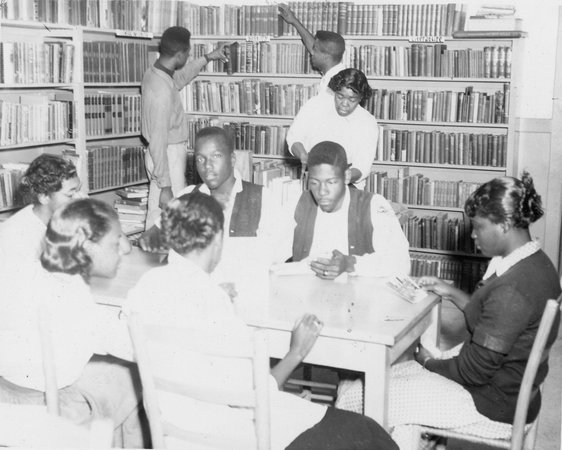
Students in the Hooper-Renwick School library, 1953.

In 1945, 29 students attended Hooper-Renwick, and by the 1958-59 school year there were 187 students. In 1936 the school employed four teachers, and by 1956 it employed 15. The educational level of teachers varied, from two years of college education to a bachelor's degree.

=== Services ===
School buses were used to transport students to school. Class offered to High School students included English, Literature, Math, Science, History, Government/Civics, Foreign Language, Home Economics, and Agriculture. The school was underfunded compared to white schools in the Gwinnett County system, with a lack of text books and other educational classroom materials. From 1951, the school library holdings increased from 200 books to as many as 8,131 books by 1956. Many of the books were damaged and inherited discards from the white schools.

The school had both male and female basketball teams, but did not have a gym. The basketball court was outdoors on bare dirt. The school mascot was the Hornets.

== Desegregation ==
Gwinnett County school superintendent B.B. Harris submitted a desegregation plan in the spring of 1965, with the plan of desegregating that fall. School desegregation plans were submitted to the U.S. Department of Health, Education, and Welfare (HEW) and evaluated under the Civil Rights Act of 1964. Integration in the county began during the 1966-67 school year. Hooper-Renwick began closing in 1968, with most students transferred to Central Gwinnett High School, the white High School in Lawrenceville.

The building was afterward used for a variety of purposes within the Gwinnett County Public School System. The building was used as a storage warehouse and administration offices, and after a renovation in 1996 the building was used as the GIVE Center for special education.

== Preservation & Future ==
In 2015, the city of Lawrenceville purchased the property from GCPS with the intention of redeveloping it as part of the South Lawn project. Alumni of the school began a preservation effort and, in March 2016, Greg Lott and Dorothy Maxey spoke at a Gwinnett County Commission meeting. In response, the county established the Hooper-Renwick Legacy Preservation Committee in April 2016. It is the official organization charged with ensuring the preservation of the school, including the physical building and oral histories, and promoting recognition of its historical importance.

In September 2017, the Committee and Gwinnett County Government agreed to preserve the existing 12-room school building. In December 2020, the city and county agreed to convert the building into a museum and themed library. In October 2022 a ceremonial groundbreaking ceremony was held to mark the beginning of construction on the new library and museum, with plans to open the facility in June 2025.
