= Gwinnett Justice and Administration Center =

Courthouse in Gwinnett County, Georgia

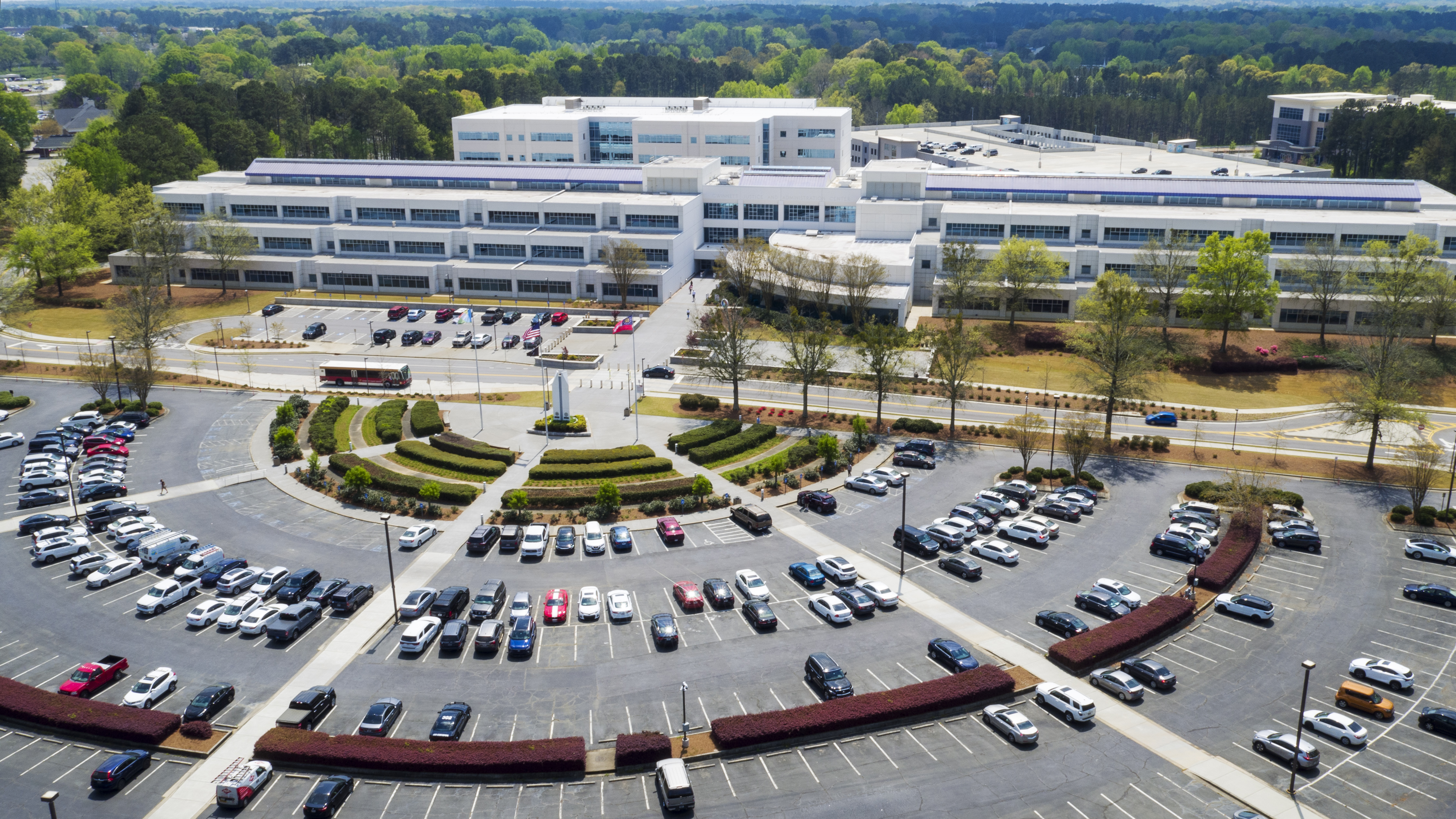
- Alternative names: Gwinnett County Courthouse, GJAC

General information
- Architectural style: Modern
- Classification: Courthouse
- Location: 75 Langley Drive, Lawrenceville, Georgia, United States
- Coordinates: 33°57′5.21″N 83°59′35.09″W
- Completed: 1988
- Cost: $72 million

Technical details
- Floor count: 4
- Floor area: 508,000 square feet (47,000 m^{2})
- Grounds: 61 acres (25 ha; 0.095 sq mi)

Design and construction
- Architecture firm: Richardson, Inc and Architects Plus

Website
- www.gwinnettcourts.com

The Gwinnett Justice and Administration Center (also called the Gwinnett County Courthouse or GJAC) is a courthouse and administrative center for Gwinnett County, Georgia located in the county seat of Lawrenceville, Georgia.

== History ==
The Gwinnett Justice and Administration Center was built in 1988 at a cost of $72 million to replace the original Gwinnett County Courthouse, which had been built in 1872 shortly after the American Civil War.

The facility was designed by architecture firms Richardson, Inc. from Dallas, Texas, and Architects Plus from Norcross, Georgia.

In 2021 the Gwinnett County Board of Commissioners approved a $34 million renovation to the Gwinnett Justice and Administration Center and the nearby One Justice Square building. The One Justice Square building is one block away from the GJAC and contains office spaces for the Gwinnett County Department of Planning and Development

== Facility ==
The facility, also known as the Gwinnett County Courthouse, is located at 75 Langley Drive in Lawrenceville. The primary facility is 508,000 square feet (47,000 m^{2}) and consists of four levels on 61 acres (25 ha; 0.095 sq mi) of land. The facility consists of 27 courtrooms, offices for various departments of the Gwinnett County government, and a law library.

In 2019 a 487,600 square feet (45,000 m^{2}) parking deck was added which has 1,450 parking spaces.

=== Expansion ===
Charolotte J. Nash Court Building
- Alternative names: Gwinnett County Courthouse Expansion

General information
- Completed: 2020
- Cost: $75 million

Technical details
- Floor count: 5
- Floor area: 228,000 square feet (21,000 m^{2})

Design and construction
- Architecture firm: Pieper O'Brien Herr Architects and DLR Group

A $75 million expansion project in 2020 included the construction of a new five-story, 228,000 square feet (21,000 m^{2}) courthouse building called the Charolotte J. Nash Court Building. The Nash building was designed by the architecture firms Pieper O'Brien Herr Architects and DLR Group. The Nash building is connected to the original GJAC building via an enclosed pedestrian bridge. The courthouse expansion was named after Charlotte J. Nash, a retired chairwoman for the Gwinnett County Board of Commissioners.
