= Joshua Ezeudu =

American football player (born 1999)

No. 73 – Kansas City Chiefs
- Position: Tackle
- Roster status: Active

Personal information
- Born: September 19, 1999 (age 27); Lawrenceville, Georgia, U.S.
- Listed height: 6 ft 4 in (1.93 m)
- Listed weight: 310 lb (141 kg)

Career information
- High school: Archer (Lawrenceville)
- College: North Carolina (2018–2021)
- NFL draft: 2022: 3rd round, 67th overall pick

Career history
- New York Giants (2022–2025); Kansas City Chiefs (2026–present)

Awards and highlights
- Third-team All-ACC (2020)

Career NFL statistics as of 2025
- Games played: 33
- Games started: 10
- Stats at Pro Football Reference

Jamuike-Tomisin "Joshua" Ezeudu (born September 19, 1999) is an American professional football tackle for the Kansas City Chiefs of the National Football League (NFL). He played college football for the North Carolina Tar Heels.

== Early life ==
Ezeudu was born to a Nigerian family, and grew up in Lawrenceville, Georgia, and attended Archer High School. Ezeudu was rated a three-star recruit and committed to play college football at North Carolina over offers from Colorado State, Connecticut, and Missouri.

== College career ==
Ezeudu played in one game during his true freshman season before redshirting the rest of the year. He became the Tar Heels' starting left guard midway through his redshirt freshman season. Ezeudu started ten games during his redshirt sophomore year and was named third-team All-Atlantic Coast Conference (ACC). He played in all 12 of UNC's games with 11 starts as a redshirt junior and was named honorable mention All-ACC. After the season, Ezeudu announced that he would forgo his remaining collegiate eligibility and enter the 2022 NFL draft.

== Professional career ==
Pre-draft measurables
Height	Weight	Arm length	Hand span	Wingspan	40-yard dash	10-yard split	20-yard split	20-yard shuttle	Three-cone drill	Vertical jump	Broad jump	Bench press
6 ft 4 1/4 in (1.94 m)	308 lb (140 kg)	34 in (0.86 m)	9 1/2 in (0.24 m)	6 ft 10 1/4 in (2.09 m)	5.19 s	1.84 s	2.99 s	4.56 s	7.83 s	28.5 in (0.72 m)	8 ft 9 in (2.67 m)	20 reps
All values from NFL Combine/Pro Day

=== New York Giants ===
Ezeudu was selected by the New York Giants with the 67th pick in the third round of the 2022 NFL draft. He played in 10 games as a rookie, starting two at left guard.

Ezeudu entered the 2023 season as a backup. He named the starting left tackle in Week 2 due to injuries, and started the next five games. He suffered a toe injury in Week 6 and was placed on injured reserve on October 17, 2023.

On March 18, 2026, Ezeudu re-signed with the Giants.

=== Kansas City Chiefs ===
On August 25, 2026, Ezeudu was traded to the Kansas City Chiefs in exchange for a 2028 seventh round pick.
