= List of Valdosta State Blazers in the NFL draft =

This is a list of Valdosta State Blazers football players in the NFL draft.

== Key ==
B	Back	K	Kicker	NT	Nose tackle
C	Center	LB	Linebacker	FB	Fullback
DB	Defensive back	P	Punter	HB	Halfback
DE	Defensive end	QB	Quarterback	WR	Wide receiver
DT	Defensive tackle	RB	Running back	G	Guard
E	End	T	Offensive tackle	TE	Tight end

= Pro Bowler
= Hall of Famer

== Selections ==
Year	Round	Pick	Player	Team	Position
1990	10	257	Robert Morris	Seattle Seahawks	DE
1993	8	204	Antonio Edwards	Seattle Seahawks	DE
1997	7	220	Artie Ulmer	Minnesota Vikings	LB
2013	4	108	Edmund Kugbila	Carolina Panthers	G
2019	7	238	Stephen Denmark	Chicago Bears	DB
2022	7	244	Christian Matthew	Arizona Cardinals	DB
