= Charles Duffy =

Charles Duffy may refer to:

- Charles Cashel Gavan Duffy (1855–1932), Australian public servant
- Charles Gavan Duffy (1816–1903), Irish nationalist, journalist, poet and Australian politician
- Charles Gavan Duffy (Canadian politician) (1874–1958), Canadian politician
- Charles John Duffy (1919–1941), U.S. Navy officer
- Charles Lee Duffy (born 1976), American serial killer
- Charles Leonard Gavan Duffy (1882–1961), Australian judge
