= Gwinnett County Courthouse =

- Gwinnett Historic Courthouse
- U.S. National Register of Historic Places
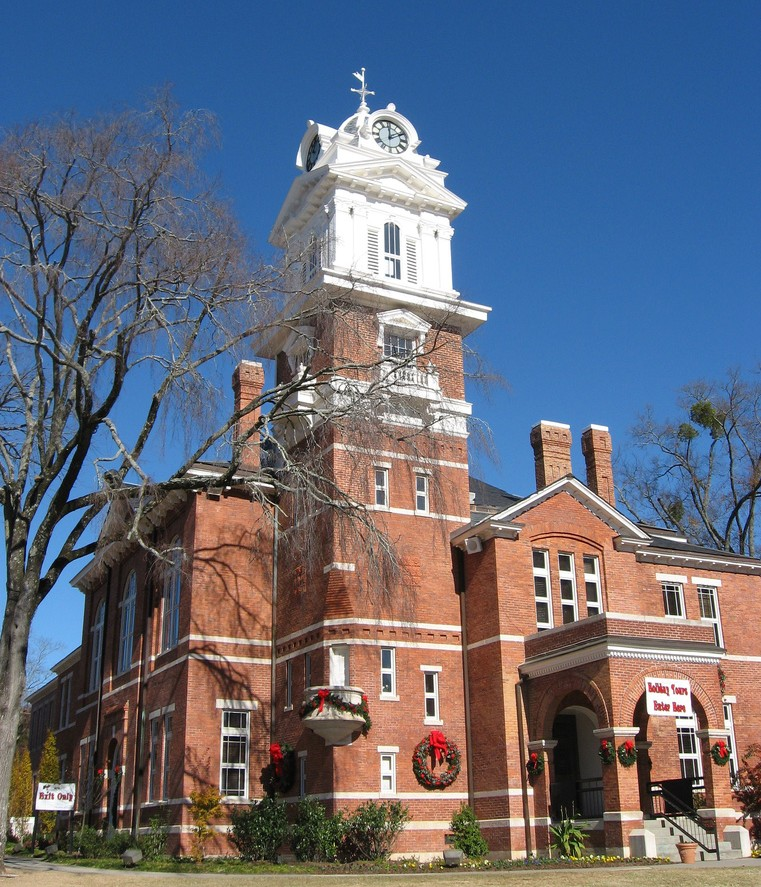
- Gwinnett County Courthouse with Christmas decorations.

- Location within Georgia Location within the United States
- Interactive map showing the location of Gwinnett Historic Courthouse
- Location: Lawrenceville, Georgia
- Coordinates: 33°57′24″N 83°59′21″W
- Built: 1885
- Architect: E. G. Lind
- Architectural style: Romanesque
- MPS: Georgia County Courthouses TR
- NRHP reference No.: 80001084
- Added to NRHP: September 18, 1980

The Gwinnett County Courthouse, also known as the Gwinnett Historic Courthouse, is an historic courthouse located at 185 West Crogan Street in Lawrenceville in Gwinnett County, Georgia.

The Gwinnett County Courthouse was built in 1885 and served as the administrative centre of Gwinnett County for over a century until its operations were moved to the Gwinnett Justice and Administration Center in 1988. The old Courthouse underwent a lengthy three year renovation starting in 1989 and reopened on July 3, 1992, as the Gwinnett Historic Courthouse. Today, it serves as a rental venue for weddings, concerts, conferences, and other special events. It is one of the parks maintained by the Gwinnett County Parks and Recreation Department.

On September 18, 1980, the Gwinnett County Courthouse was added to the National Register of Historic Places.

== History ==
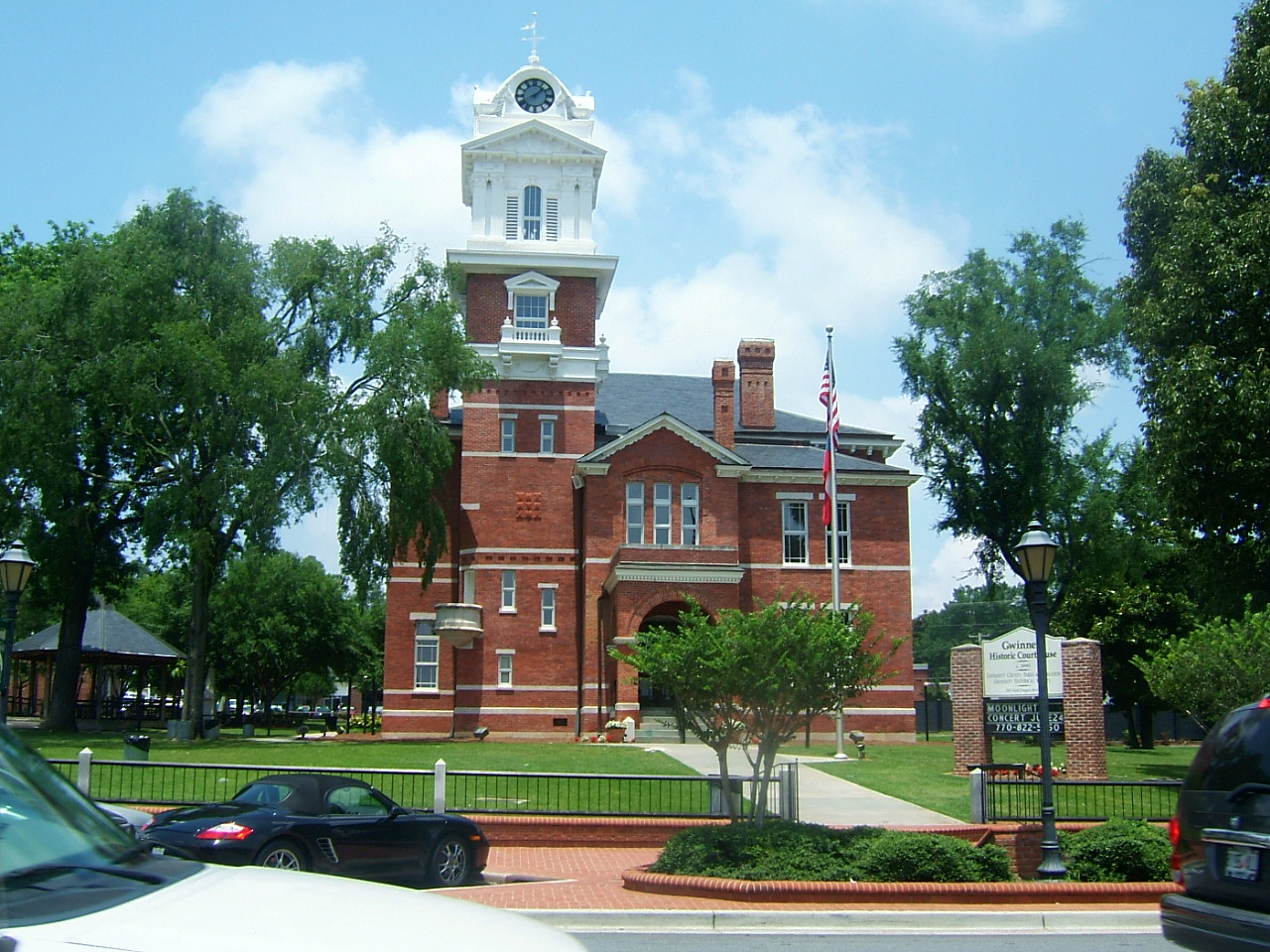
Gwinnett County Courthouse from West Crogan Street.

The Gwinnett County Courthouse was built in 1885 to serve as the administrative centre of Gwinnett County, replacing the original courthouse which was burnt down by the Ku Klux Klan in 1871. It served as county courthouse for over a century until population growth in the mid-to-late 20th Century meant it could no longer handle all of the county's business. Gwinnett County's population grew rapidly from 29,000 in 1940 to 166,000 in 1980, mainly due to suburbanization and white flight from Atlanta since the post-World War II period. The Gwinnett County Courthouse could no longer handle the increasing demands, as the county's population doubled between the 1970 and 1980 censuses alone. The majority of its operations were moved in 1988 to the newly-built and significantly larger Gwinnett Justice and Administration Center located at 75 Langley Drive in Lawrenceville.

In 1993, a statue commemorating the Confederate States was erected outside the courthouse with an inscription of "1861–1865 Lest We Forget". The statue stood until February 2021, when it was removed and placed in storage as part of the removal of Confederate monuments and memorials that occurred in the months following the George Floyd protests. The Gwinnett County Board of Commissioners approved the change, saying the monument was not consistent with the modern values of the county.

== See also ==
- Gwinnett County, Georgia
- Lawrenceville, Georgia
