= Gwinnett School of Mathematics, Science, and Technology =

The Gwinnett School of Mathematics, Science, and Technology

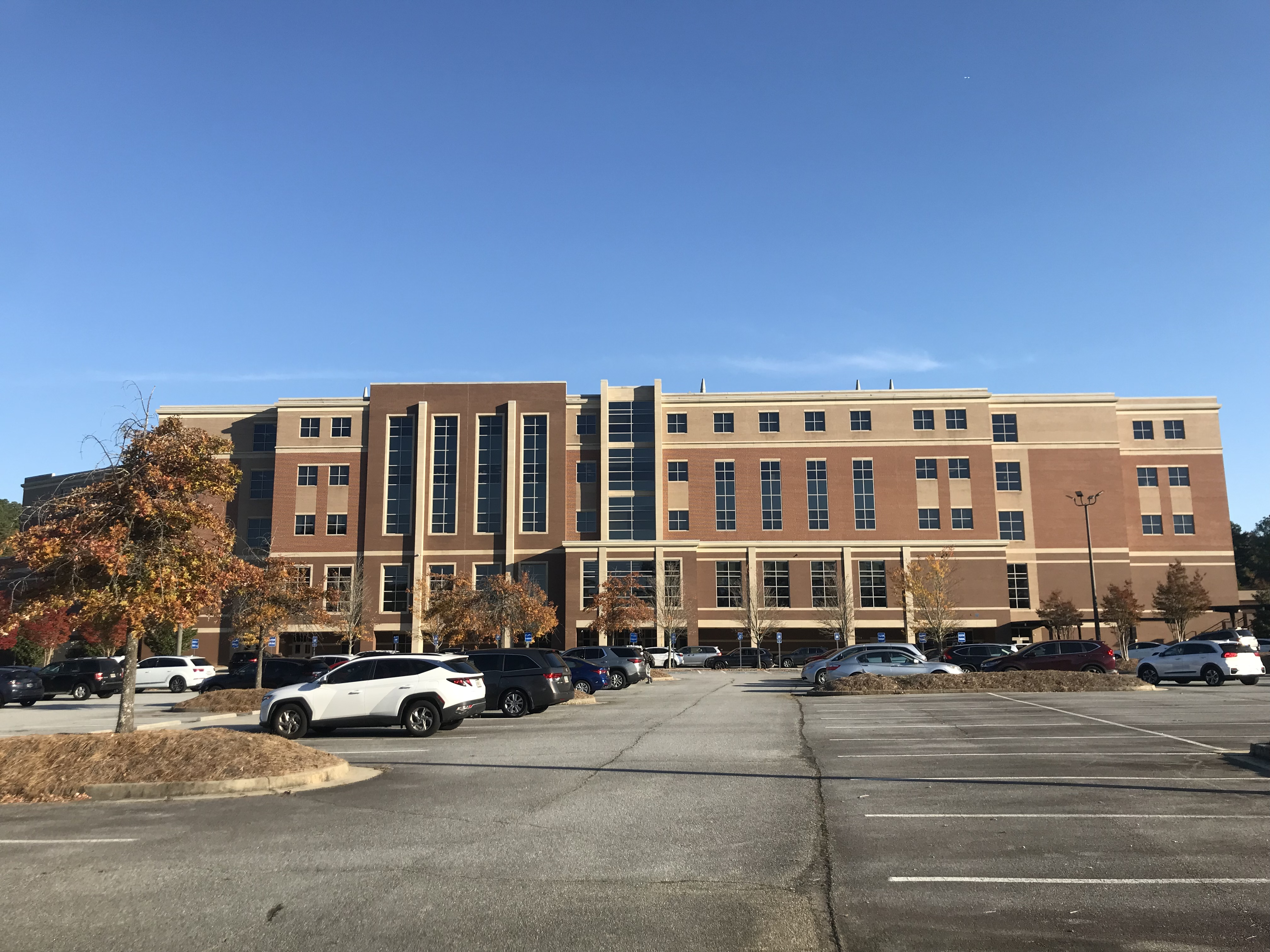

Location
- 970 McElvaney Lane; Lawrenceville, Georgia 30044; United States; 33°57′11″N 84°03′37″W

Information
- Type: Special public (formerly charter public)
- Motto: Infinite Possibilities
- Established: 2007
- School district: Gwinnett County Public Schools
- Principal: Logan Malm
- Faculty: 77.60 (FTE)
- Grades: 9-12
- Enrollment: 1,275 (2023-24)
- Area: 25.06 acres (shared with the neighboring Maxwell High School)
- Campus type: Suburban
- Colors: Blue and silver
- Communities served: Gwinnett County
- Website: gsmst.gcpsk12.org

The Gwinnett School of Mathematics, Science, and Technology (GSMST) is a specialized public school in Lawrenceville, Georgia (United States), and a part of Gwinnett County Public Schools. Students are admitted through a county-wide lottery, whose participants, since the school dropped its charter status in 2016, must meet multiple requirements. It features a heavy focus on project-based STEM education. Its rigorous course offerings and high student graduation rate make it one of the most prestigious high schools in the state.

== History ==
The school was chartered in March 2006 by the Gwinnett County Board of Education through SPLOST and opened in the fall of 2007. It was temporarily housed on the Duluth High School campus, but building 100 began in 2007 as a separate school from Duluth High School. Renovations updated and modernized 18 classrooms and offices, and GSMST moved to its permanent location in 2010 at the geographic center of Gwinnett County, near Sugarloaf Parkway and Old Norcross Road, the former site of Benefield Elementary School. The new building is designed for a maximum of 1,200 students. The school is adjacent to the Maxwell High School of Technology.

In 2016, GSMST was awarded the Blue Ribbon Award. In 2023, GSMST was ranked the No. 1 high school in the state of Georgia by U.S. News & World Report for its eleventh consecutive year. As of 2026, it is ranked seventh in the nation.
