= Jonathan Massaquoi =

Liberian gridiron football player (born 1988)

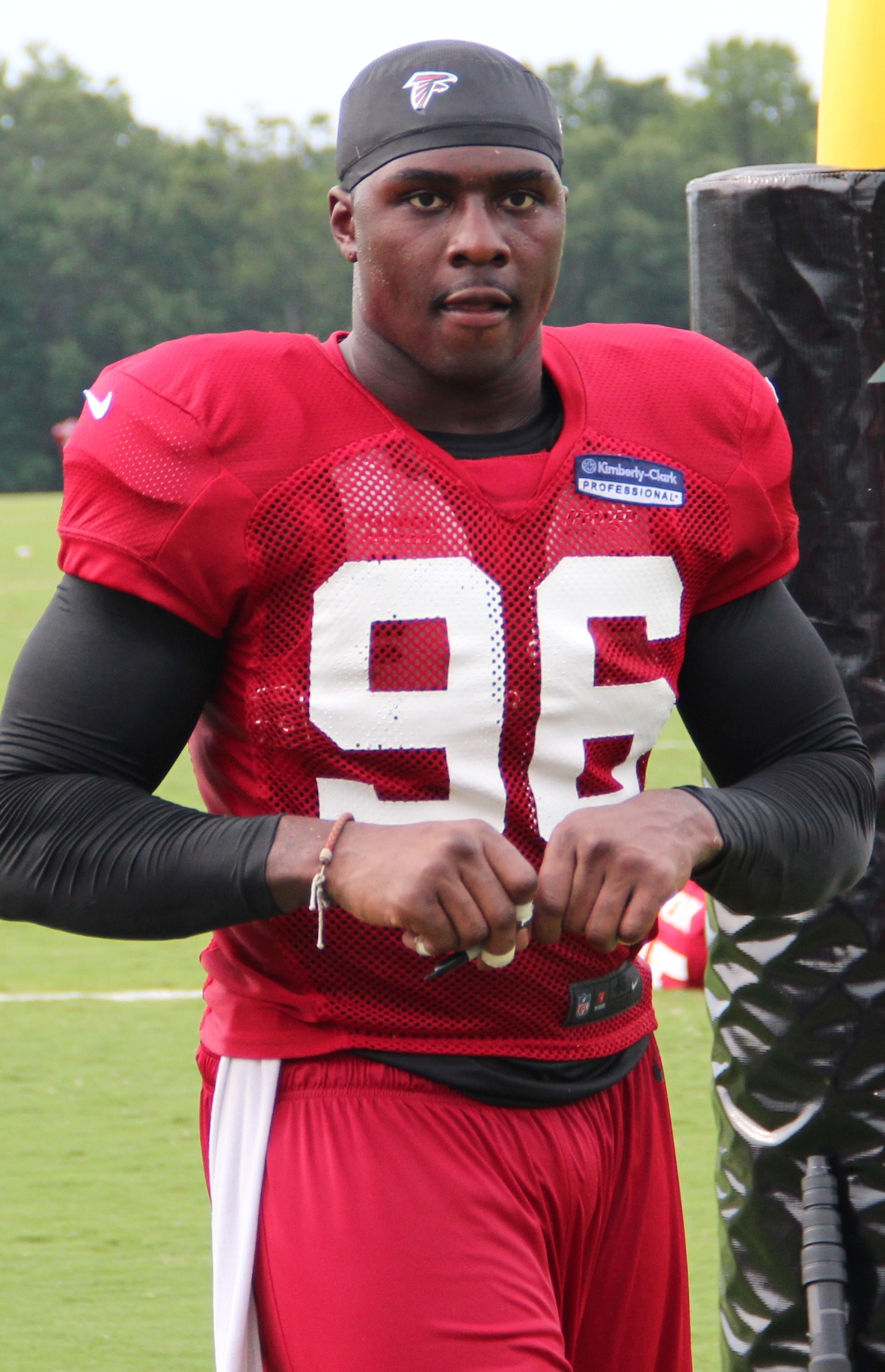
- Massaquoi with the Atlanta Falcons in 2013

No. 96, 94
- Position: Linebacker

Personal information
- Born: 11 May 1988 (age 38); Monrovia, Liberia
- Listed height: 6 ft 2 in (1.88 m)
- Listed weight: 264 lb (120 kg)

Career information
- High school: Central Gwinnett (Lawrenceville, Georgia)
- College: Troy
- NFL draft: 2012: 5th round, 164th overall pick

Career history
- Atlanta Falcons (2012–2014); Tennessee Titans (2015)*; Kansas City Chiefs (2016)*; Birmingham Iron (2019); Calgary Stampeders (2019)*; Dallas Renegades (2020)*; DC Defenders (2020)
- * Offseason or practice squad member only

Awards and highlights
- First-team All-Sun Belt (2010)

Career NFL statistics
- Total tackles: 70
- Sacks: 6
- Stats at Pro Football Reference

Jonathan Massaquoi (born 11 May 1988) is a Liberian former professional American football linebacker. He was selected by the Atlanta Falcons in the fifth round of the 2012 NFL draft. He played college football at Troy.

== College career ==
After playing his high school football at Central Gwinnett High School, Massaquoi attended Butler County Community College for a year before transferring to Troy University. During his two years at Troy he recorded 128 tackles and 19.5 sacks.

On 13 January 2012, Massaquoi announced that he would forgo his senior season and enter the 2012 NFL draft.

== Professional career ==
=== Atlanta Falcons ===
Massaquoi was selected by the Atlanta Falcons in the 5th round (164th overall) in the 2012 NFL draft. He was waived on 27 February 2015.

=== Tennessee Titans ===
Massaquoi was claimed off waivers on 3 March 2015 by the Tennessee Titans. On 6 September 2015, he was waived by the Titans.

=== Kansas City Chiefs ===
Massaquoi signed with the Kansas City Chiefs on 9 March 2016. On 28 August 2016, Massaquoi was waived by the Chiefs.

=== Birmingham Iron ===
In 2018, Massaquoi signed with the Birmingham Iron of the Alliance of American Football for the 2019 season. In the season opener against the Memphis Express, Massaquoi recorded two sacks with seven tackles.

=== Calgary Stampeders ===
After the AAF ceased operations in April 2019, Massaquoi signed with the Calgary Stampeders of the Canadian Football League on 17 May 2019.

=== Dallas Renegades ===
In 2019, Massaquoi was selected by the Dallas Renegades in the 2020 XFL draft. He was waived during final roster cuts on 22 January 2020.

=== DC Defenders ===
Massaquoi was claimed off waivers by the DC Defenders on 22 January 2020. He had his contract terminated when the league suspended operations on 10 April 2020.
