= Phoenix High School (Lawrenceville, Georgia) =

Location
- 501 West Pike Street; Lawrenceville, Georgia; United States; 33°57′48″N 84°00′18″W

Information
- Type: Public
- School district: Gwinnett County Public Schools
- NCES School ID: 130255002039
- Principal: Niki Ross
- Teaching staff: 38.00 (FTE)
- Grades: 9–12
- Enrollment: 873 (2023-2024)
- Student to teacher ratio: 22.97
- Website: https://www.gcpsk12.org/PhoenixHS

Phoenix High School is an open-campus public high school in Lawrenceville, Georgia, a suburb north of Atlanta, and a part of the Gwinnett County Public School System.

Phoenix offers childcare for parents who wish to attend class. The school does not offer extra-curricular activities. The school's website states that this allows students to better focus on academics.
