= Bown v. Gwinnett County School District =

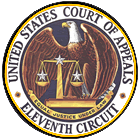
- Court: United States Court of Appeals for the Eleventh Circuit
- Full case name: Bown v. Gwinnett County School District
- Decided: May 6, 1997
- Citations: 112 F.3d 1464; 65 USLW 2740; 118 Ed. Law Rep. 28; 97 FCDR 2801; 10 Fla. L. Weekly Fed. C 902

Case history
- Subsequent history: Certiorari denied by the United States Supreme Court.

Court membership
- Judges sitting: R. Lanier Anderson III, Edward Earl Carnes, Richard D. Cudahy (7th Cir.)

Case opinions
- Majority: Anderson, joined by a unanimous court

Laws applied
- U.S. Const. amend. I

Bown v. Gwinnett County School District, 112 F.3d 1464 (11th Cir. 1997), refers to an Eleventh Circuit Court case in which the plaintiff, Brian Bown, a school teacher, challenged as an unconstitutional Establishment Clause violation Georgia's law requiring a "Moment of Quiet Reflection". The Court ruled that the Moment of Quiet Reflection was not unconstitutional. The Supreme Court of the United States denied certiorari for an appeal.

== Background ==
The State of Georgia passed the Moment of Quiet Reflection in Schools Act, which came into effect in 1994. The law did not require or endorse prayer, saying that it "is not intended to be and shall not be conducted as a religious service or exercise".

Public school teacher Brian Bown challenged the Act. He sued the Gwinnett County School District, alleging that the law was an Establishment Clause violation implicitly requiring school prayer. At trial, the United States District Court for the Northern District of Georgia ruled that the Act did not violate the establishment clause.

== Opinion of the Court ==
The Eleventh Circuit Court heard the case and ruled that the Act did not violate the Establishment Clause, holding that it did not violate any of the three prongs of the Lemon test.
