= Edmund Kugbila =

Ghanaian-born American football player (born 1990)

No. 71, 70
- Position: Guard

Personal information
- Born: September 21, 1990 (age 36); Ghana
- Listed height: 6 ft 4 in (1.93 m)
- Listed weight: 325 lb (147 kg)

Career information
- High school: Central Gwinnett (Lawrenceville, Georgia)
- College: Valdosta State
- NFL draft: 2013: 4th round, 108th overall pick

Career history
- Carolina Panthers (2013–2014)

Awards and highlights
- NCAA Division II national champion (2012)
- Stats at Pro Football Reference

Edmund Kugbila (born September 21, 1990) is a Ghanaian former professional American football offensive guard. He played college football at Valdosta State, and was selected by the Carolina Panthers in the fourth round of the 2013 NFL draft.

== Early life ==
Kugbila was born in Ghana. He moved to the United States at age 10, after his parents won permanent residency allowance in the "green card lottery". He attended Central Gwinnett High School in Lawrenceville, Georgia, and played high school football for the Central Gwinnett Black Knights.

== College career ==
While attending Valdosta State University, Kugbila played for the Valdosta State Blazers football team from 2009 to 2012.

== Professional career ==
The Carolina Panthers chose Kugbila in the fourth round, with the 108th overall pick, of the 2013 NFL draft. Kugbila suffered from a strained hamstring, and after suffering numerous setbacks, he was placed on injured reserve on August 27. After rehabbing the injury in the offseason, he injured his back. It was announced on July 24, 2014 that he would undergo back surgery and miss the entire season. On May 20, 2015, he was waived, appearing in zero games.
