= Wesley Duke =

American football player (born 1981)

Profile
- Position: Tight end

Personal information
- Born: June 21, 1981 (age 45); Grand Prairie, Texas
- Listed height: 6 ft 5 in (1.96 m)
- Listed weight: 225 lb (102 kg)

Career information
- College: Mercer

Career history
- Denver Broncos (2005); Hamburg Sea Devils (2006)
- Stats at Pro Football Reference

Wesley Duke (born June 21, 1981) is a football player. Duke was a tight end for the Denver Broncos in the National Football League.

== Biography ==
Duke was born in Grand Prairie, Texas. He played both basketball and football for the Meadowcreek High School Mustangs in Norcross, Georgia.

Duke played NCAA basketball for the Mercer University Bears in Macon, Georgia.

Despite not playing college football, Duke was signed as an undrafted free agent by the Denver Broncos. Duke tore his knee ligament and was released on June 9, 2006.
