= Berkmar High School =

Public high school located in Lilburn, Georgia, United States

Location
- 405 Pleasant Hill Road; Lilburn, Georgia 30047; United States; 33.90658°N 84.11511°W

Information
- Type: Public
- Established: 1966
- School district: Gwinnett County Public Schools
- Principal: Gabriel Zaragoza
- Teaching staff: 200.60 (FTE)
- Grades: 9–12
- Enrollment: 2,975 (2024–2025)
- Student to teacher ratio: 14.83
- Campus: Urban
- Color: Red White Blue
- Athletics conference: 7A in Class AAAAAAA (GHSA)
- Mascot: Patriot
- Rivals: Meadowcreek High School (Mustangs), Parkview High School (Panthers)
- Accreditation: SACS
- Website: berkmarhs.gcpsk12.org

Berkmar High School is a high school located in Lilburn, Georgia, United States. It has approximately 2,912 students, grades 9 through 12.

The school opened in 1966 to help overcrowding at nearby schools due to the growth of Gwinnett County.

== Description ==
Berkmar Middle School and Sweetwater Middle School are its main feeder schools.

In 2002 Berkmar received a renovation with a new front entrance to the school, a gymnasium, a two-story building to hold offices, classrooms, a media center, and an improved parking lot.

Berkmar has three buildings of classrooms, two gyms, a theater, and many portable classrooms. Adjacent to the football field are a baseball field, hitting facility, softball field, practice field, and four tennis courts. A football training facility has been built in a former parking area. The new football training room has also helped with the overcrowding of classrooms.

== Academics ==
Berkmar operates an Advanced Placement (AP) program. The school won the 2008 Inspiration Award from the College Board for its high numbers, and had the 2010 and 2013 female Georgia State AP Scholars. The title of State AP Scholar is granted to one male and one female student in each U.S. state and the District of Columbia, with scores of 3 or higher on the greatest number of AP exams, and then the highest average score (at least 3.5) on all AP exams taken.

Berkmar also participates in the QuestBridge scholarship program, a non-profit program that aims to link high-achieving, low-income students with educational and scholarship opportunities at U.S. colleges and universities. It includes the National College Match program for high school seniors.

== Extracurricular activities ==
Berkmar High School's extracurricular clubs include the National Honor Society and National Beta Club.

The school's Academic Decathlon team held the title of Georgia State Championships for six consecutive years (2003–2008). In 2009, Berkmar did not make it to the Nationals, but won first in their division. In 2012, the team served as state co-champions with neighboring Parkview High School, and traveled to Minneapolis for the national championship.

=== Athletics ===
Berkmar competes in Region 7, Class AAAAAAA, the largest classification for Georgia high schools. Region 7, a geographical designation, includes Brookwood High School, Meadowcreek High School, and Parkview High School.

== Notable alumni ==
- Wayne Arnold, basketball player
- Kirshnik Ball, Migos rapper known as Takeoff
- Kiari Cephus, Migos rapper known as Offset
- Troy Davis, football linebacker
- Amber Nash, voice actor
- Quavious Marshall, Migos rapper known as Quavo
- Steve Whitmire, Muppet puppeteer with The Jim Henson Company and Sesame Workshop
- Wesley Witherspoon, basketball player who played overseas
