= Mountain View High School (Georgia) =

Public high school outside of Lawrenceville, Georgia, United States

Location
- 2351 Sunny Hill Rd. Lawrenceville, Georgia 30043; United States; 34°03′08″N 83°57′08″W

Information
- School type: Public
- Motto: Expect excellence in everything
- Established: 2009
- School district: Gwinnett County Public Schools
- Superintendent: Calvin J. Watts
- Principal: Brandon Jackson
- Teaching staff: 131.10 (FTE)
- Grades: 9–12
- Student to teacher ratio: 16.94
- Hours in school day: 7:10 am – 2:10 pm
- Colors: Black and Vegas gold
- Fight song: "Hail The View"
- Mascot: Bear
- Website: https://mountainviewhs.gcpsk12.org/

Mountain View High School is a public high school outside of Lawrenceville, Georgia, United States. It is a part of Gwinnett County Public Schools. It opened for classes on August 10, 2009.

== History ==
Mountain View was originally created with students from Mill Creek High School, Collins Hill High School, and Dacula High School. It currently serves students from the Mountain View geographic cluster of feeder schools.

The Mountain View cluster is made up of Dyer Elementary, Freeman's Mill Elementary, Woodward Mill Elementary, Twin Rivers Middle School, and Mountain View High School.
