= Paul Duke STEM High School =

Coordinates: 33.9520°N 84.2231°W

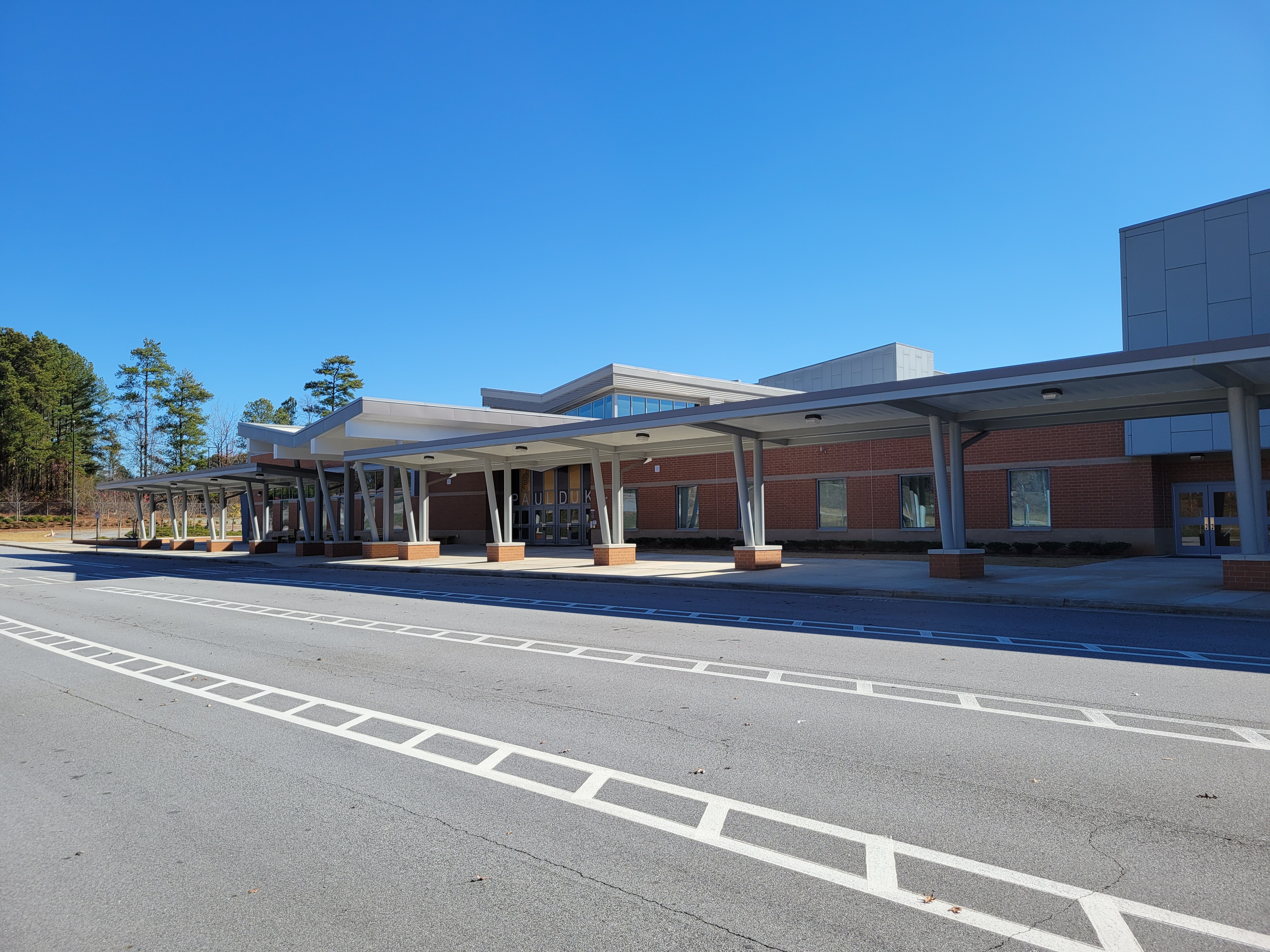
- Paul Duke STEM High School December of 2018

Location
- 5850 Peachtree Industrial Blvd; Norcross, Georgia 30071

Information
- School type: Public high school
- Motto: Learn Together. Lead Tomorrow.
- Established: 2018
- School district: Gwinnett County Public Schools
- Principal: Jonathon Wetherington
- Teaching staff: 74.50 (FTE)
- Grades: 9-12
- Enrollment: 1,388 (2024–2025)
- Student to teacher ratio: 18.60
- Colors: Blue; Gold; White; Navy
- Mascot: Road Runner

Paul Duke STEM High School (PDS HS) is a senior high school located on Peachtree Industrial Boulevard in Norcross, Georgia. It is a part of Gwinnett County Public Schools (GCPS). The school's mascot is the Road runner.

Its attendance boundary coincides with that of Norcross High School. The boundary includes Norcross and sections of Peachtree Corners.

== History ==
Paul Duke, which opened in 2018 with grades 9–11, with 1,390 prospective students as of August 2023, has a STEM focus. Built for $38 million, it relieved Norcross High School; as of 2018 it only takes students in the Norcross High attendance zone, including areas of Peachtree Corners, and therefore is not yet a magnet school.

The 296,565-square-foot (27,551.8 m^{2}) capacity school, the smallest built in the period 2008–2018, has fine arts, music, and gymnasium spaces, but will not have its own non-intramural sports team facilities. Of the schools built circa 2008-2018 it had the highest per-square foot costs. The school is named after Paul A. Duke who founded Peachtree Corners.
