= Charles Lee Duffy =

Convicted American serial killer

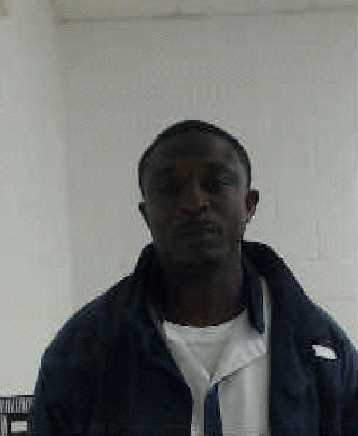
- Mugshot
- Born: May 10, 1976 (age 50); Norcross, Georgia, U.S.
- Other names: Tarus Smith; Charles Lee Gates
- Conviction: Murder (3 counts)
- Penalty: 2 life sentences without parole

Details
- Victims: 3
- Span of crimes: June 24 – August 1, 1997
- Country: United States
- State: Georgia
- Date apprehended: August 5, 1997

Charles Lee Duffy (born May 10, 1976) is an American serial killer and rapist who murdered three women in the metro Atlanta area between June and August 1997. Within days of the final murder, Duffy was turned in by his mother, who had recognized him after surveillance images of the killer were broadcast. He subsequently pleaded guilty and received two life sentences without parole.

== Early life ==
Duffy was born on May 10, 1976, in Norcross, Georgia.

== Murders ==
On June 24, 1997, 40-year-old Priscilla Culberson was reported missing after she failed to show up for work. The subsequent investigation led to police locating her purse and other bloody items along the side of the road in Atlanta, but her body was not found until the following sundown when Culberson's 20-year-old daughter discovered her nude body in an empty lot near a bus terminal. Detectives located semen samples from the killer, as well as blood which were determined to have been the result of Culberson attempting to fight off her attacker. Both samples were taken as evidence.

Just after 5:00pm on July 30, 42-year-old Gwendolyn Wyche, the daughter of a Minister O.L. Blackshear, was shot in the back multiple times just outside her home. Police later located her laying on the sidewalk, and rushed her to Dekalb Medical Center, but could not resuscitate her and she was pronounced dead not long after. The initial motive for the killing was thought to have been a failed robbery. The suspect was also reported to have been driving a blue vehicle, and the weapon used was confirmed to be a revolver.

Two days later, on August 1, 52-year-old Pok Yeo Kim was working in the afternoon when a robbery occurred, during which the assailant shot her, and stole money from the register. A surveillance camera captured the individual on film, and he was described as a black man, 5 ft 10inch, approximately 160 pounds and about 23 in age.

== Investigation and arrest ==
The last two murders were eventually connected by police, who sought out for a suspect. They released the surveillance video to the public in hopes of new information. Soon after, a woman contacted the heads on the investigative team, and claimed her son, 21-year-old Charles Lee Duffy was the perpetrator, after identifying him as the man seen on the video. Duffy, a convicted robber, was on probation at the time of the killings, after being released from prison in January after spending time for robbery and auto-theft. After this, detectives focused their investigation on their prime suspect, who was confirmed to be involved in the death of Yeo Kim after a partial fingerprint match. Afterwards the investigative team went public with their information, but Duffy would not surrender to the police, despite urges from his mother.

Days later, police picked up a man walking alone apparently appearing high on drugs. When asked who he was, the man claimed he was Tarus Smith, and he was found to be in possession of a screw driver, so he was arrested and sent to the Chamblee City jail to await further charges. It was not until a while later, that Smith was confirmed to be Duffy, which came off as a relief to investigators who believed Duffy was a danger to society.

== Imprisonment ==
Duffy made a full confession to the killings of Yeo Kim and Wyche and thus he skipped a trial. He pleaded guilty to each count in March 1998 and was sentenced to life in prison without parole.

In 2003, Fulton County District Attorney Paul Howard formed the Fulton County Cold Case unit, which re-examined unsolved cases in the counties history. As a result, many unsolved cases in the area that included DNA were reinvestigated, and in some instances were solved. In 2005, the murder of Priscilla Culberson, which was still unsolved by that time, was reexamined. As a result, the semen found on her body was run in the crime lab, and after a DNA profiling test, it matched Duffy's DNA, which was on record after he was admitted to Georgia State Prison. After being confronted with the news, Duffy confessed, and in 2007 was given a life sentence without the possibility for parole.

== See also ==
- List of serial killers in the United States
