= WIN (wrestling magazine) =

American amateur wrestling magazine

WIN magazine, officially titled Wrestling Insider News Magazine, is a magazine that reports on all aspects of high school and college wrestling in the United States. Founded in 1994, the magazine the magazine is headquartered in Newton, Iowa.
