= Seckinger High School =

Public high school in Buford, Georgia, U.S.

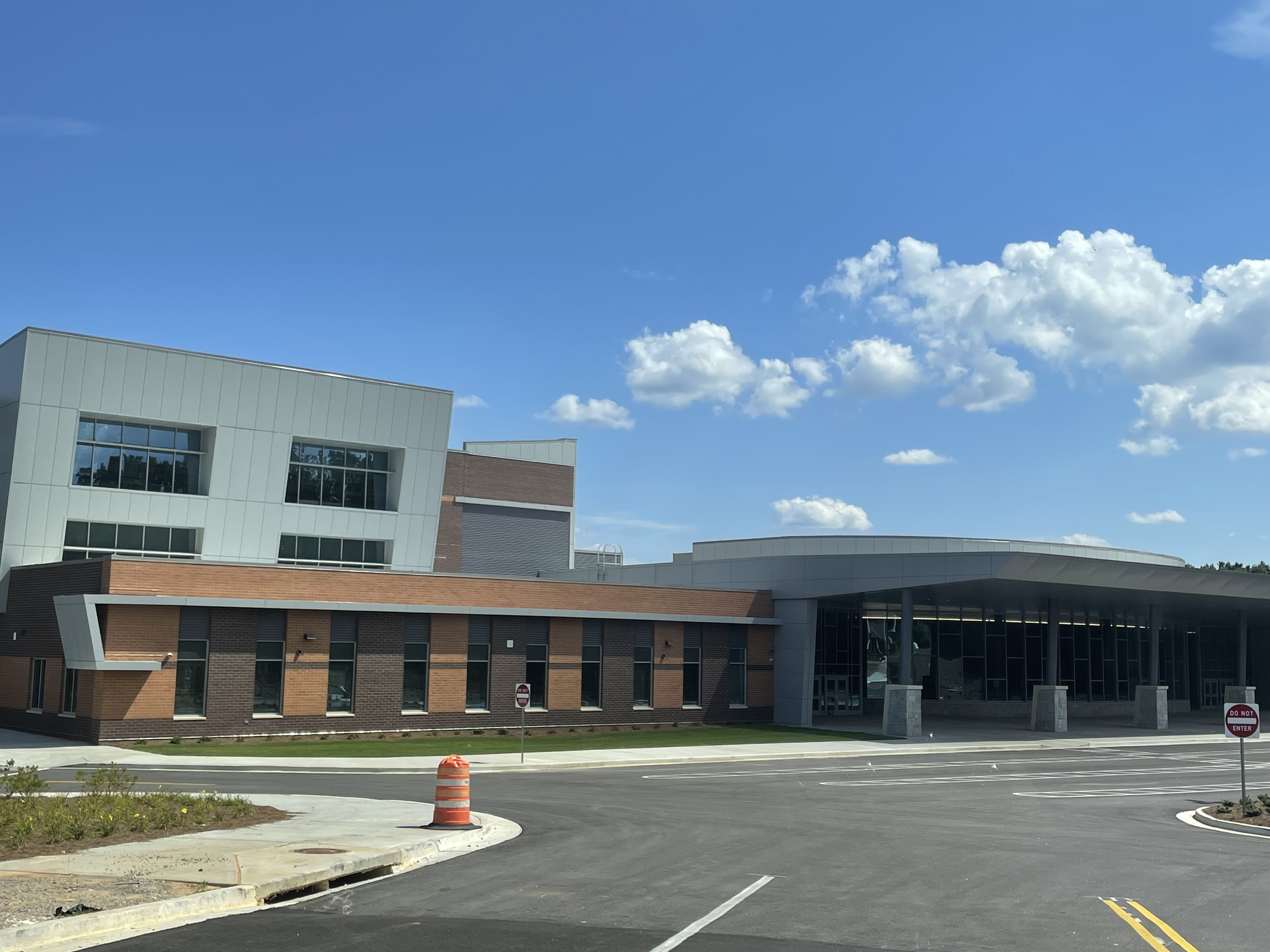

Location
- 3655 Sardis Church Road; Buford, Georgia 30519; United States; 34°04′44″N 83°54′42″W

Information
- Type: Public high school
- Established: August 2022
- School district: Gwinnett County Public Schools
- Principal: Jimmy Fisher
- Staff: 107.41 (FTE)
- Grades: 9–12
- Enrollment: 2,008 (2023–2024)
- Capacity: 2,800 students
- Student to teacher ratio: 18.67
- Campus size: 85.66 acres (34.67 ha)
- Area: 510,485 square feet (47,425.6 m^{2})
- Colors: Blue, Black, and Gray
- Nickname: Jaguars
- Website: www.gcpsk12.org/SeckingerHS

Seckinger High School is an American four-year comprehensive high school in unincorporated Buford, Georgia. It is the only high school in the Seckinger cluster of the Gwinnett County Public Schools System, and opened in August 2022 as a public school. Jones Middle School, which feeds into Seckinger High School, is also a part of the Seckinger cluster along with three elementary schools.

The school has an artificial intelligence theme, with artificial intelligence, machine learning, and data science curriculums to prepare students for careers in technology-related sectors. The school offers four different career-based sets of classes: advanced sciences and technology, international and civic leadership, art and design, or a personalized hybrid track.

== History ==
Seckinger High School is named after former Gwinnett County School Board member Dan Seckinger, who served on the board for 24 years. There was controversy around the naming of the school in part because in 2018, Seckinger voted to name the school after himself during his final meeting as board member. The school board did not follow their own school naming process when choosing the name, as the Board has longstanding rules against naming schools after current and recently serving board members.

The school's architecture was designed by Atlanta-based architecture firm Smallwood, Reynolds, Stewart, Stewart.

The opening of the high school created approximately 200 new jobs.

== Sports ==
Seckinger High School is part of the Georgia High School Association's Region 8-4A.

Prior to the school's opening, the school received a flag football grant in April 2022 from the Atlanta Falcons, the Arthur M. Blank Family Foundation, and Nike, Inc. to help establish a flag football program for the school.
