= Meadowcreek High School =

Public high school in Norcross, Georgia, United States

Location
- 4455 Steve Reynolds Blvd; Norcross, Georgia 30093; United States; 33°55′22″N 84°08′56″W

Information
- Type: Public
- Established: 1986
- School district: Gwinnett County Public Schools
- Principal: Kevin Wood
- Teaching staff: 194.20 (FTE)
- Grades: 9–12
- Enrollment: 2,640 (2023–2024)
- Student to teacher ratio: 13.59
- Campus: Urban
- Colors: Carolina Blue and White
- Mascot: Mustang/Region 7-AAAAA
- Newspaper: Pony Express
- Website: https://meadowcreekhs.gcpsk12.org/

Meadowcreek High School is a public high school located in unincorporated Norcross, Georgia, United States, off I-85 and led by principal Kevin Wood.

The school is part of the Gwinnett County Public Schools system. Meadowcreek High School is the most diverse secondary institution in the state of Georgia, with a student body representing over 90 different nationalities. Hispanics make up the majority with 65% of its students being of Hispanic/Latino descent.

== Achievements ==
- 2008 - The culinary team won first place in the Georgia ProStart competition, which was the first time in the school's history that this honor had been given.
- 2008 - On September 5, 2008, Meadowcreek football broke its 43-game losing streak by defeating Duluth.
- 2009 - The culinary team successfully defended its state title at the Georgia ProStart competition.
- 2017 - The Meadowcreek Men's Varsity Soccer Team won the 7A Georgia State Championship.
- 2017 - Tommy T. Welch was named principal of the year for the state of Georgia and one of three finalists for the National Principal of the Year.
- 2018 - The Meadowcreek Men's Varsity Basketball Team won the 7A Georgia State Championship.
- 2018 - The culinary team won first place in the Georgia ProStart competition. Simone Byron was named Georgia ProStart Teacher of the Year.
- 2019 - The Meadowcreek Men's Varsity Basketball Team finished runner-up in the 7A Georgia State Tournament.
- 2019 - Cicely Lewis was named Media Specialist of the Year for the District, Region, and State.
- 2019 - The Meadowcreek Men's Varsity Soccer Team finished tied for third in the 7A Georgia State Tournament.

== Statistics ==
- Demographics (2014-2015 school year, last available numbers)
  - Hispanic: 62%
  - Black: 25%
  - Asian: 8%
  - White: 3%
  - Other: 2%

== Notable alumni ==
- Wesley Duke (class of 1996) - college basketball and NFL football player
- David Hendrix, former professional football player
- Amber Holt, WNBA basketball player
- Dulcé Sloan, comedian
