= Lawrenceville, Georgia =

City in Georgia, United States

- City
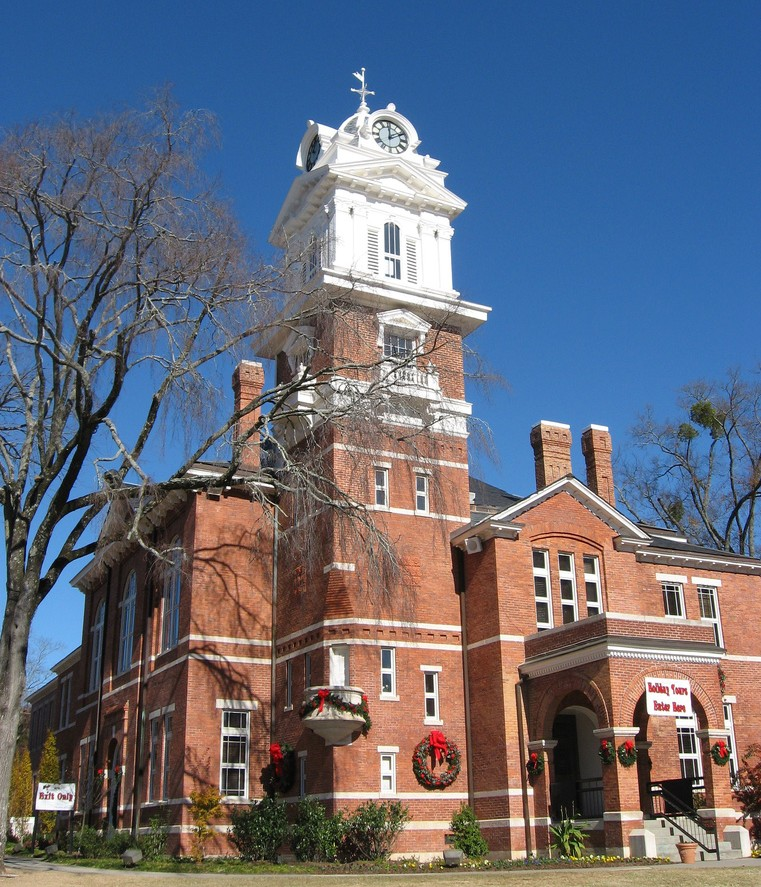
- Gwinnett County Courthouse

- Logo
- Nickname: The Crepe Myrtle City
- Interactive map of Lawrenceville, Georgia
- Coordinates: 33°57′08″N 83°59′36″W
- Country: United States
- State: Georgia
- County: Gwinnett
- Established: December 15, 1821
- Named for: James Lawrence

Government
  - Type: Council–manager government
  - Mayor: David Still

Area
  - Total: 13.80 sq mi (35.73 km^{2})
  - Land: 13.69 sq mi (35.46 km^{2})
  - Water: 0.11 sq mi (0.28 km^{2})
- Elevation: 1,083 ft (330 m)

Population (2020)
  - Total: 30,629
  - Density: 2,237.3/sq mi (863.83/km^{2})
- Time zone: UTC-5 (Eastern (EST))
  - Summer (DST): UTC-4 (EDT)
- ZIP codes: 30042-30046, 30049
- Area code: 404/678/770
- FIPS code: 13-45488
- GNIS feature ID: 2404897
- Website: www.lawrencevillega.org

Lawrenceville is a city in and the county seat of Gwinnett County, Georgia, United States. It is a suburb of Atlanta, located about 30 miles (50 km) northeast of downtown Atlanta. It was incorporated on December 15, 1821. As of the 2020 census, the population of Lawrenceville was 30,629.

== History ==
Lawrenceville was incorporated by an act of the Georgia General Assembly on December 15, 1821. This makes Lawrenceville the second oldest city in the metropolitan Atlanta area. The city is named after Commodore James Lawrence, commander of the frigate Chesapeake during the War of 1812. Lawrence, a native of New Jersey, is probably best known today for his dying command, "Don't give up the ship!" William Maltbie, the town's first postmaster, suggested the name of "Lawrenceville."

In 1821, a permanent site for the county courthouse was selected and purchased, the four streets bordering the square were laid out along with other streets in the village, and a public well was dug. Major Grace built the first permanent courthouse, a brick structure, in 1823–24 for a cost of $4,000. The courthouse presently on the square was constructed in 1885.

Most of Lawrenceville's residents farmed cotton.

During the tumultuous era of the Civil War, Gwinnett County stood as a notable exception, casting its vote against secession. At the heart of this dissent was Lawrenceville, the county seat, which dispatched three delegates to represent its staunch opposition to secession. This resistance stemmed partly from the county's unique demographic makeup, characterized by a relatively low slave population, where the ratio of whites to slaves stood at four to one.

Despite its initial reluctance to join the secessionist cause, Lawrenceville found itself drawn into the conflict, as it rallied to support the Confederate war effort. The bustling town was home to the Lawrenceville Manufacturing Company, a prominent cotton mill established in the 1850s. This mill played a vital role in producing essential textile goods, including uniforms, to supply the Confederate army.

While Lawrenceville itself remained untouched by the direct clashes of battle, it was not spared the ravages of war. The infamous March to the Sea led by General Sherman brought the conflict to its doorstep. The town became a target for frequent raids by Union forces, disrupting daily life and instilling fear among its inhabitants.

One of the most devastating blows came when Union soldiers set fire to the Lawrenceville Manufacturing Company, dealing a severe blow to the city's commercial infrastructure. This act of destruction not only symbolized the toll of war on the town's economy, but also underscored the intense division and strife tearing through the nation during this tumultuous period. By the end of the war, half of the wealth of Lawrenceville was lost by the Civil War.

Courtland Winn served two terms as mayor starting in 1884, when he was 21 years old.

The two most famous people born in Lawrenceville gained their fame elsewhere. Charles Henry Smith, born in 1826, left as a young man and lived most of his life in other Georgia towns. During the Civil War, he wrote humorous pieces for Atlanta newspapers under the name Bill Arp. He has been described as the South's most popular writer of the late 19th century, though he is not much read today. Ezzard Charles, born in 1921, grew up in Cincinnati, where opportunities for African Americans were far better at the time than in the Deep South. He eventually became the world heavyweight boxing champion by defeating Joe Louis by unanimous decision on September 27, 1950.

Lawrenceville was one of many venues in the nation where Hustler magazine publisher Larry Flynt faced obscenity charges in the late 1970s. On March 6, 1978, during a lunch break in his Lawrenceville trial, his local attorney Gene Reeves and he were shot by a sniper near the courthouse. Both survived, though Flynt was seriously disabled. Years later, imprisoned serial killer Joseph Paul Franklin claimed to have been the shooter, but he never produced any proof and was not charged in the case. (Franklin was executed in 2013 in Missouri for a 1977 sniper slaying.) A heavily fictionalized treatment of the Flynt shooting can be seen in the 1996 movie The People vs. Larry Flynt.

The Gwinnett Justice and Administration Center was built in 1988 at a cost of $72 million to replace the original Gwinnett County Courthouse, which had been built in 1872 shortly after the Civil War. The Justice and Administration Center was expanded with an addition of a five-level parking deck and a five story courthouse in 2020.

Since 1988, Lawrenceville has been the headquarters of the Presbyterian Church in America.

== Geography ==
Lawrenceville is located in central Gwinnett County. According to the United States Census Bureau, the city has a total area of 13.5 square miles (35.0 km^{2}), of which 0.1 sq mi (0.3 km^{2}), or 0.83%, is covered by water.

Nearby cities are Dacula to the east, Buford to the north, Suwanee to the north-northwest, Duluth to the northwest, Norcross to the west, Lilburn to the southwest, Snellville to the south, and Grayson to the southeast.

=== Climate ===
Lawrenceville has a humid subtropical climate (Köppen climate classification Cfa).

Climate data for Lawrenceville, Georgia
Month	Jan	Feb	Mar	Apr	May	Jun	Jul	Aug	Sep	Oct	Nov	Dec	Year
Record high °F (°C)	80 (27)	79 (26)	87 (31)	94 (34)	97 (36)	101 (38)	104 (40)	103 (39)	100 (38)	89 (32)	87 (31)	76 (24)	104 (40)
Mean daily maximum °F (°C)	54 (12)	58 (14)	66 (19)	74 (23)	81 (27)	88 (31)	91 (33)	89 (32)	83 (28)	74 (23)	65 (18)	55 (13)	73 (23)
Mean daily minimum °F (°C)	31 (−1)	33 (1)	39 (4)	46 (8)	55 (13)	64 (18)	68 (20)	67 (19)	60 (16)	50 (10)	40 (4)	33 (1)	49 (9)
Record low °F (°C)	−8 (−22)	1 (−17)	5 (−15)	24 (−4)	33 (1)	40 (4)	51 (11)	44 (7)	34 (1)	24 (−4)	13 (−11)	−4 (−20)	−8 (−22)
Average precipitation inches (mm)	4.83 (123)	4.66 (118)	4.91 (125)	3.96 (101)	3.90 (99)	4.70 (119)	4.63 (118)	5.05 (128)	4.37 (111)	3.54 (90)	4.13 (105)	4.85 (123)	53.53 (1,360)

== Demographics ==
Historical population
Census	Pop.	Note	%±
1880	463		—
1890	566		22.2%
1900	853		50.7%
1910	1,518		78.0%
1920	2,059		35.6%
1930	2,156		4.7%
1940	2,223		3.1%
1950	2,932		31.9%
1960	3,804		29.7%
1970	5,207		36.9%
1980	8,928		71.5%
1990	16,848		88.7%
2000	22,397		32.9%
2010	28,546		27.5%
2020	30,629		7.3%
2025 (est.)	32,822	▲	7.2%
U.S. Decennial Census; 2025

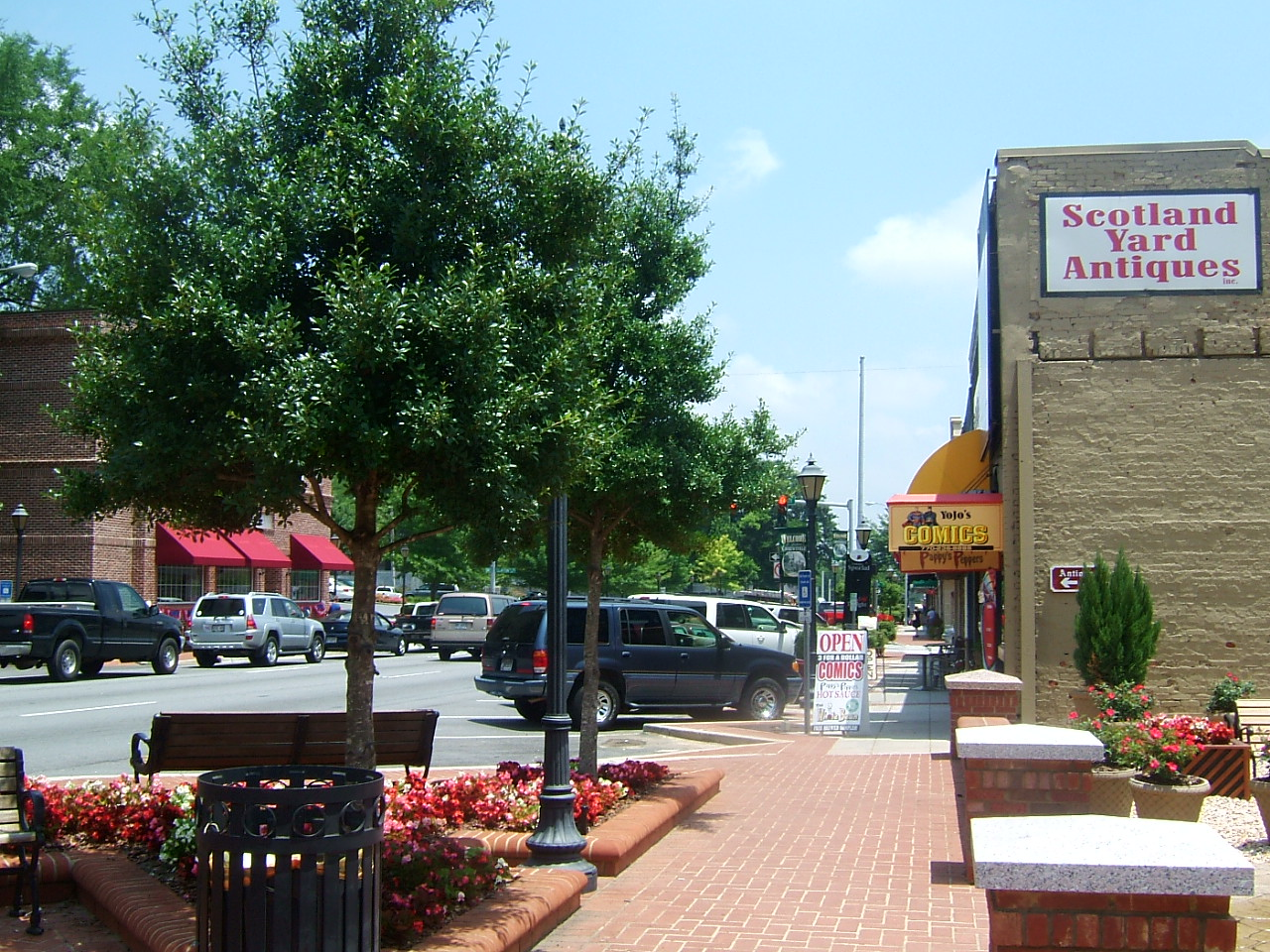
Downtown Lawrenceville (as of June 2006)

=== 2020 census ===
As of the 2020 census, 30,629 people, 10,076 households, and 7,071 families resided in the city. The median age was 33.4 years. 26.0% of residents were under the age of 18 and 12.4% of residents were 65 years of age or older. For every 100 females there were 90.3 males, and for every 100 females age 18 and over there were 84.8 males age 18 and over.

100.0% of residents lived in urban areas, while 0.0% lived in rural areas.

There were 10,076 households in Lawrenceville, of which 39.2% had children under the age of 18 living in them. Of all households, 42.1% were married-couple households, 17.8% were households with a male householder and no spouse or partner present, and 33.4% were households with a female householder and no spouse or partner present. About 22.7% of all households were made up of individuals and 9.6% had someone living alone who was 65 years of age or older.

There were 10,660 housing units, of which 5.5% were vacant. The homeowner vacancy rate was 1.8% and the rental vacancy rate was 5.4%.

Racial composition as of the 2020 census
Race	Number	Percent
White	9,108	29.7%
Black or African American	10,761	35.1%
American Indian and Alaska Native	327	1.1%
Asian	2,336	7.6%
Native Hawaiian and Other Pacific Islander	10	0.0%
Some other race	4,566	14.9%
Two or more races	3,521	11.5%
Hispanic or Latino (of any race)	8,553	27.9%

== Economy ==
Atlanta Biologicals is located in Lawrenceville.

Peach State Federal Credit Union, headquartered in Lawrenceville, serves 39,800 members across Barrow, Clarke, DeKalb, Forsyth, Gwinnett, Jackson, Oconee, and Walton Counties.

It hosts the headquarters of KiK Consumer Products, parent company of BioLab Inc.

According to the City of Lawrenceville's 2045 Comprehensive Plan, the primary employment sectors in Lawrenceville as of 2025 include healthcare (9,451 workers), public administration (7,822 workers), education (5,346 workers), and retail (3,292 workers), reflecting the city's role as a regional center for medical services, government operations, and education.

Several major employers in Gwinnett County also contribute to the local economy, including Gwinnett County Public Schools, Gwinnett County government, Northside Hospital, Publix, Georgia Gwinnett College, Gwinnett Technical College, and America's Best Contacts and Eyeglasses.

== Arts and culture ==
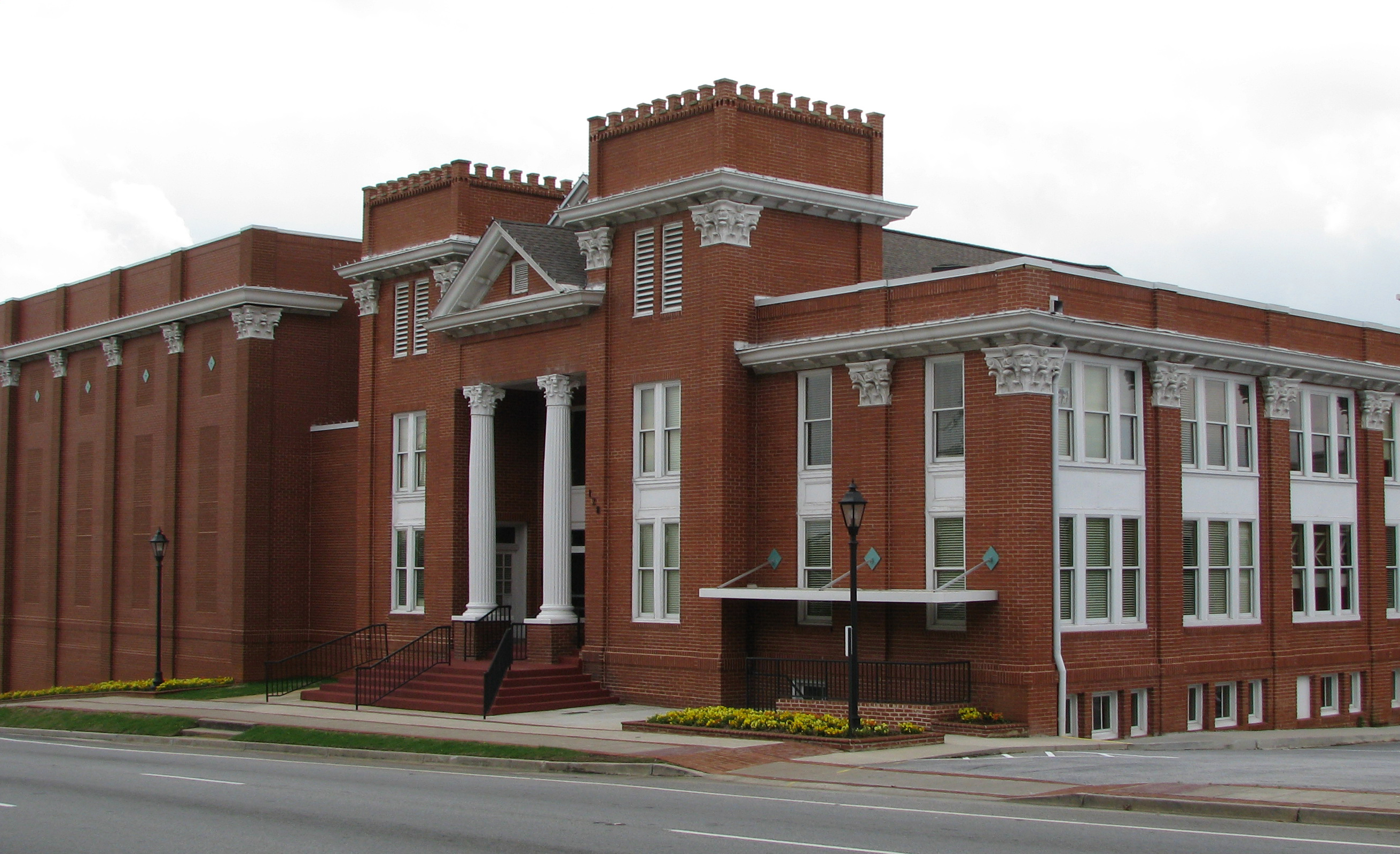
The Aurora Theatre

The Old Seminary Building, Isaac Adair House and Gwinnett County Courthouse in Lawrenceville are listed on the National Register of Historic Places.

The Lawrenceville Arts Center, the new home of the Aurora Theatre, brings art and culture together in the center of the historic square. It features a 500-seat Proscenium theatre, a cabaret, an outdoor public courtyard, and an art gallery. A second building, the Bobby Sikes Fine Arts Building, features a 225-seat theatre and black-box theatre. The center averages 80,000 visitors per year and is owned by the City of Lawrenceville.

The Lawrenceville Lawn is a city park offering an amphitheater, playground, volleyball courts, dog park, and walking path. It is also the location of concerts and community events.

Rhodes Jordan Park, named for the former mayor, is a 162-acre park with a fishing lake, playground, extensive sports facilities, swim facilities, 1.9-mile paved trail, and the Lawrenceville Community Garden.

Fallen Heroes Memorial & Armed Forces Monument pays tribute to all Gwinnett residents who died in the line of duty in either military or public safety service. The memorial honors roughly 700 individuals.

The Lawrenceville Heritage Trail follows a series of medallions throughout the historic downtown, each dedicated to the individuals who have made significant contributions to the City of Lawrenceville throughout its history.

Gwinnett County Public Library operates a library in Lawrenceville. The Gwinnett County Public Library and the City of Lawrenceville are preserving the Hooper-Renwick Historic School Site into the first themed library of its kind in the southeastern United States. It will incorporate cultural and historic objects and artifacts with the library's resources and information, offering the opportunity for the public to learn the history of segregation and desegregation in Gwinnett.

Lawrenceville Historic Cemetery is located about one-half mile from the historic square and is the resting place of several city founders.

Freeman's Grist Mill is a Gwinnett County Park located in Lawrenceville. It features a playground that replicates a gristmill, picnic pavilion, multipurpose trail, and historic mill.

Lawrenceville Ghost Tours are available annually in September and October.

The City of Lawrenceville is home to several public murals commissioned by the Lawrenceville Arts Commission.

The City of Lawrenceville hosts an average of 30 free community events annually in the downtown historic district.

The City of Lawrenceville was designated a Tree City by the Arbor Day Foundation on February 18, 2023.

The City of Lawrenceville was declared a Purple Heart City on August 24, 2020, by Mayor David Still.

The annual Polish Pierogi Festival occurs in August, and includes food booths, music, and competitions.

== Sports ==
The Triple-A Minor League Baseball Gwinnett Stripers of the International League play at Coolray Field.

== Education ==
Gwinnett County Public Schools operates public schools.

=== Schools and school zoning in the Lawrenceville city limits ===
The following schools are in the Lawrenceville city limits. In the parenthenses is the high school that each school feeds into.

- Benefield Elementary School (Discovery)
- Margaret Winn Holt Elementary School (Central Gwinnett)
- Jenkins Elementary School (Central Gwinnett)
- Lawrenceville Elementary School (Central Gwinnett)
- Jordan Middle School (Central Gwinnett)
- Central Gwinnett High School
- Discovery High School
- Phoenix High School (alternative school)

Jenkins feeds into Jordan MS and then Central Gwinnett HS. Holt and Lawrenceville feed into Moore Middle School (outside of the city limits) and then Central Gwinnett HS. Benefield feeds into Richards Middle School (outside of the city limits) and then Discovery HS.

Some parts of the Lawrenceville city limits are zoned to Simonton Elementary School (not in the city limits), which feeds into Jordan and Central Gwinnett. Other areas are zoned to Cedar Hill Elementary School (not in the city limits), which feeds into Richards and Discovery. A subdivision to the north is zoned to Taylor Elementary School, Creekland Middle School, and Collins Hill High School (all not in the city limits).

=== Schools with Lawrenceville mailing addresses ===
The following is a list of schools outside of the city limits with Lawrenceville mailing addresses, with its high school cluster in parentheses.

==== Elementary schools ====
- J.A. Alford Elementary School (Discovery)
- Baggett Elementary School (Discovery)
- Bethesda Elementary School (Berkmar)
- Cedar Hill Elementary School (Discovery) - Adjacent to the city limits
- Corley Elementary School (Berkmar)
- Craig Elementary School (Brookwood)
- Gwin Oaks Elementary School (Brookwood)
- Simonton Elementary School (Central Gwinnett) - Adjacent to the city limits
- Kanoheda Elementary School (Berkmar)
- Jackson Elementary School (Peachtree Ridge)
- Woodward Mill Elementary School (Mountain View)
- Freeman's Mill Elementary School (Mountain View)
- Lovin Elementary School (Archer)
- K.E. Taylor Elementary School (Collins Hill)
- McKendree Elementary School (Collins Hill)
- Rock Springs Elementary School (Collins Hill)

==== Middle schools ====
- Moore Middle School (Central Gwinnett) - adjacent to the city limits
- J.E. Richards Middle School (Discovery) - Adjacent to the city limits
- Creekland Middle School (Collins Hill)
- Five Forks Middle School (Brookwood)
- Alton C. Crews Middle School (Brookwood)
- Sweetwater Middle School (Berkmar)

==== High schools ====
- Archer High School
- Gwinnett School of Mathematics, Science, and Technology
- Maxwell High School
- Mountain View High School

==== Other schools ====
- Gwinnett Intervention Education (GIVE) Center East
- Hooper-Renwick School
- Sola Fide Academy

=== Colleges and university ===
Georgia Gwinnett College is in the Lawrenceville city limits.

The following are outside of the city limits: Gwinnett Technical College

- Georgia Gwinnett College
- University of Georgia – Gwinnett Campus
- Reformed University

== Infrastructure ==
=== Transportation ===
==== Roads and expressways ====
- Georgia 316, U.S. 78 (Stone Mountain Freeway), US 29, GA 8, GA 20, and GA 120.

==== Transit systems ====
Xpress GA/ RTA Commuter buses and Ride Gwinnett serve the city.

==== Airport ====
Gwinnett County Airport is partially located in Lawrenceville.

=== Hospitals ===
Northside Hospital Gwinnett is located in Lawrenceville.

== Biorepository ==
The CDC and ATSDR Specimen Packaging, Inventory and Repository (CASPIR) biorepository located in Lawrenceville, Georgia holds over 6.5 million samples.

== Notable people ==
- Moisés Arias, television and film actor
- Jonathan Babineaux, former NFL defensive tackle
- Ezzard Charles, boxing champion who defeated Joe Louis
- Wes Chatham, actor, The Unit, The Help and Barbershop
- EJay Day, singer, finalist on first season of American Idol
- Carder England, poker player
- Rachel Farley, country music singer
- Jennifer Ferrin, actress
- Ric Flair, retired professional wrestler
- Rachel G. Fox, teen actress
- Jeff Francoeur, former MLB right fielder
- Joe Gebbia, designer and co-founder of Airbnb
- Kelly Gissendaner, murderer executed in Georgia
- Taylor Heinicke, quarterback for the Atlanta Falcons
- Russell Horning, dancer
- Ricardo Hurtado, teen actor known for School of Rock
- Hamilton Jordan, Chief of Staff to President Jimmy Carter
- Michael Kelly, actor, House of Cards
- Jonathan Massaquoi, former NFL football player
- Jimmy Maurer, soccer player
- Brian McCann, former MLB catcher
- Migos, rap group
- Grace Min, tennis player
- Maya Moore, basketball player, forward for the Minnesota Lynx
- Cosette Morché, soccer player
- Raju Rai, badminton national champion
- Kalif Raymond, NFL wide receiver with multiple teams including the Detroit Lions and the Chicago Bears
- Ted Roof, football coach
- Junior Samples, comedian
- Kobe Smith, NFL player
- Christin Stewart, MLB baseball player
- Cassandra Trenary, ballet dancer
- Darius Walker, football player
- Courtland Winn, politician and lawyer
- Rob Woodall, politician and former member of U.S. House of Representatives
- Walker Zimmerman, soccer player
- Thomas Pearl, food critic and social media personality
