= Norcross, Georgia =

- City
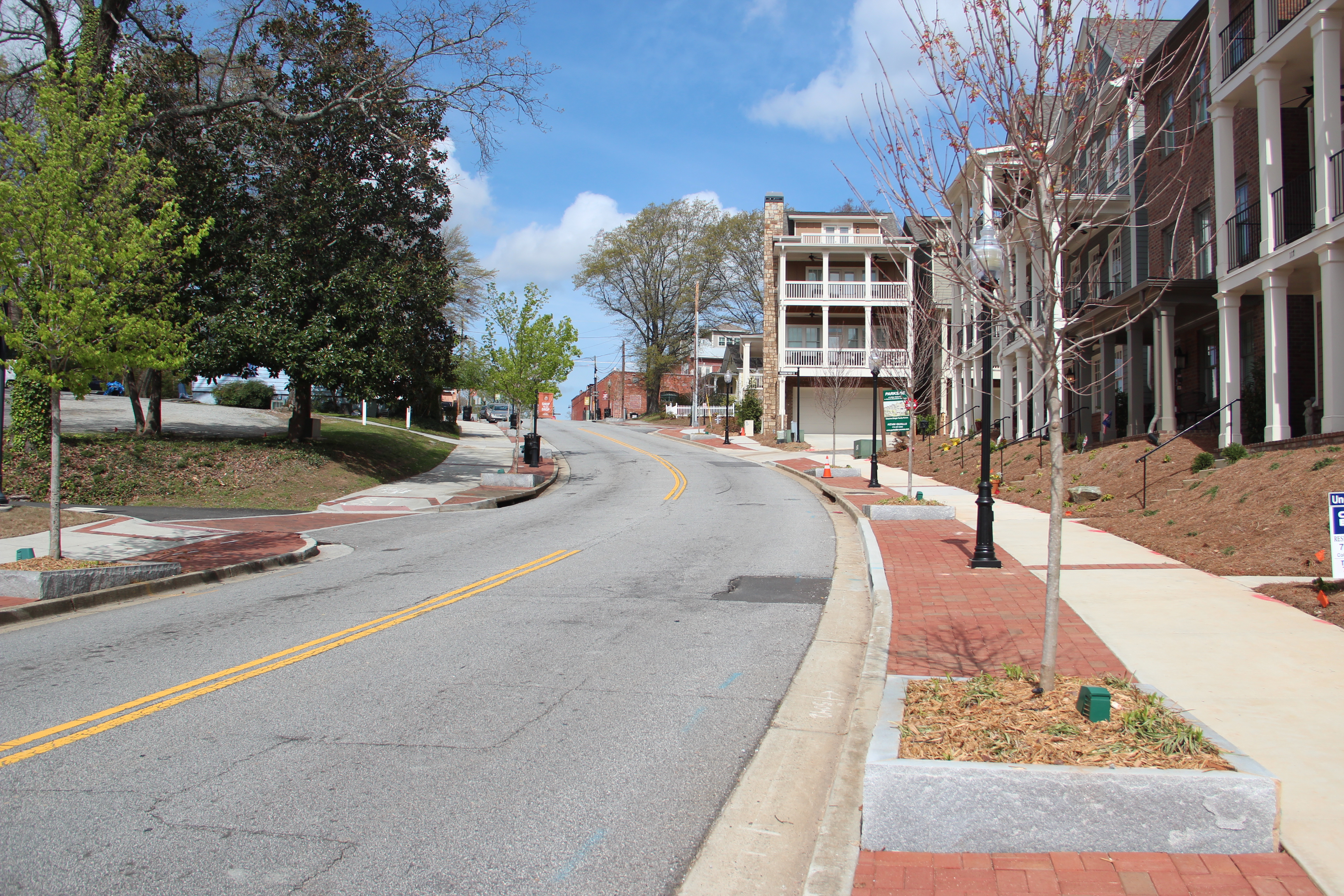
- Downtown Norcross

- Flag Logo
- Motto: "A place to Imagine"
- Coordinates: 33°56′16″N 84°12′23″W
- Country: United States
- State: Georgia
- County: Gwinnett

Government
  - Mayor: Craig Newton
  - Mayor Pro Tem: Bruce Gaynor
  - City Council: Matt Myers
  - City Council: Josh Bare
  - City Council: Andrew Hixson
  - City Council: Marshall Cheek

Area
  - Total: 6.17 sq mi (15.99 km^{2})
  - Land: 6.15 sq mi (15.93 km^{2})
  - Water: 0.023 sq mi (0.06 km^{2})
- Elevation: 974 ft (297 m)

Population (2020)
  - Total: 17,209
  - Density: 2,797.7/sq mi (1,080.18/km^{2})
- Time zone: UTC-5 (Eastern (EST))
  - Summer (DST): UTC-4 (EDT)
- ZIP codes: 30003, 30010, 30071, 30091, 30093, 30097
- Area codes: 770, 678, 470
- FIPS code: 13-55776
- GNIS feature ID: 2404384
- Website: norcrossga.net

Norcross is a city in Gwinnett County, Georgia, United States. According to the 2010 census, the population was 9,116, while in 2020, the population increased to 17,209. Norcross is part of the Atlanta metropolitan area, located near the Spaghetti Junction interchange of Interstate 85 and Interstate 285.

== History ==
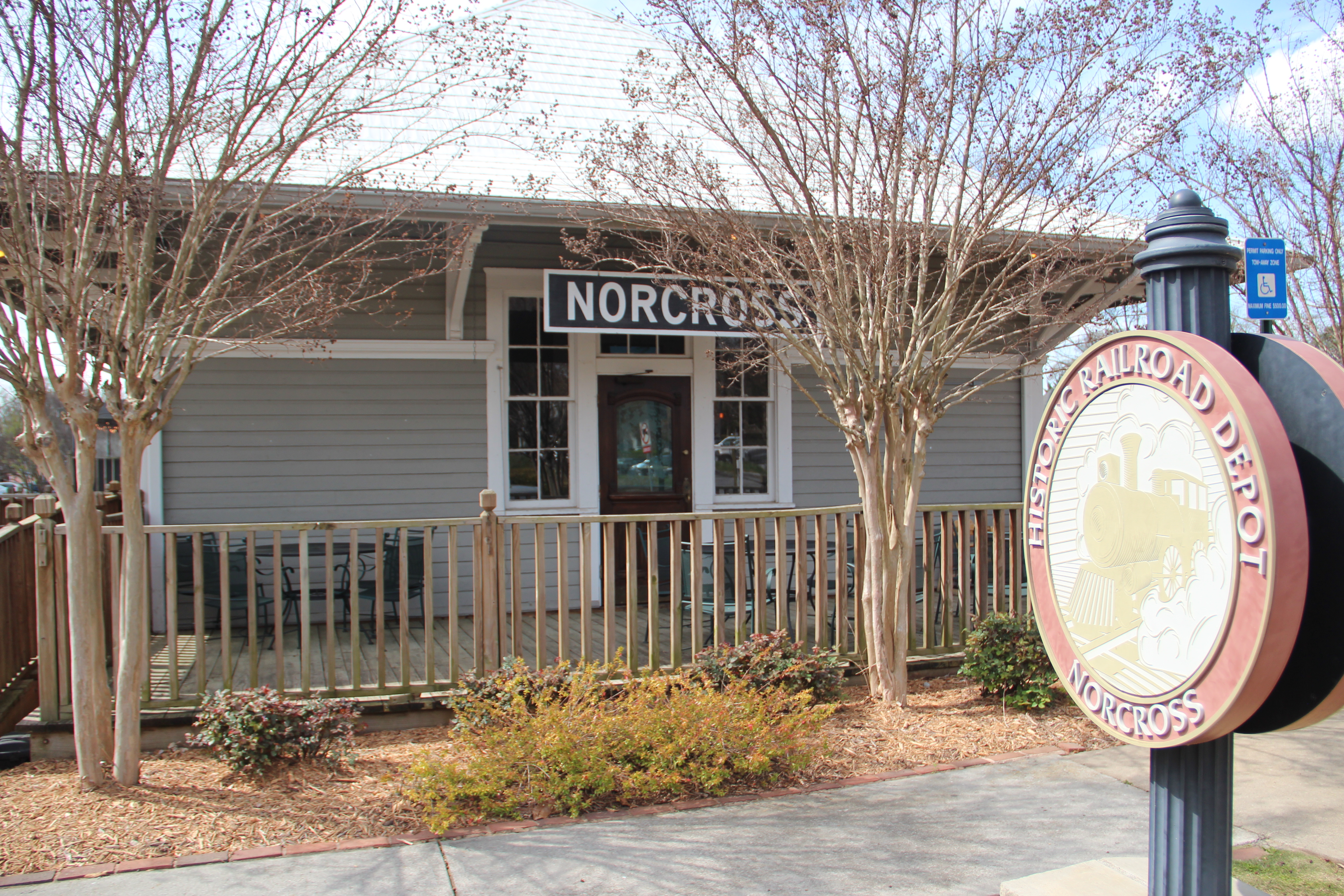
Norcross train depot

Norcross was chartered as a town on October 26, 1870. The community was named for Jonathan Norcross, a former Atlanta Mayor and railroad official.

== Geography ==
Norcross is bordered to the north by the city of Peachtree Corners. The southern boundary of the city is formed by Interstate 85, with access available from Exits 99 (Jimmy Carter Boulevard), 101 (Indian Trail Lilburn Road), and 102 (Georgia State Route 378). Atlanta city limits is located approximately 9 miles (14 km) to the southwest, accessible via I-85.

According to the United States Census Bureau, the city of Norcross has a total area of 4.65 square miles (12.05 km^{2}), of which 4.64 square miles (12.02 km^{2}) is land and 0.01 square miles (0.03 km^{2}), or 0.25%, is water.

== Demographics ==
Historical population
Census	Pop.	Note	%±
1880	500		—
1890	713		42.6%
1900	797		11.8%
1910	968		21.5%
1920	993		2.6%
1930	892		−10.2%
1940	979		9.8%
1950	1,340		36.9%
1960	1,605		19.8%
1970	2,755		71.7%
1980	3,363		22.1%
1990	5,947		76.8%
2000	8,410		41.4%
2010	9,116		8.4%
2020	17,209		88.8%
2025 (est.)	19,086	▲	10.9%
U.S. Decennial Census; 2025

=== 2020 census ===
As of the 2020 census, Norcross had a population of 17,209. The median age was 33.7 years. 26.4% of residents were under the age of 18 and 7.9% of residents were 65 years of age or older. For every 100 females there were 101.0 males, and for every 100 females age 18 and over there were 100.5 males age 18 and over.

100.0% of residents lived in urban areas, while 0.0% lived in rural areas.

There were 5,813 households in Norcross, including 3,674 families. Of all households, 40.2% had children under the age of 18 living in them, 42.1% were married-couple households, 22.0% were households with a male householder and no spouse or partner present, and 28.8% were households with a female householder and no spouse or partner present. About 22.8% of all households were made up of individuals and 4.4% had someone living alone who was 65 years of age or older.

There were 6,069 housing units, of which 4.2% were vacant. The homeowner vacancy rate was 1.6% and the rental vacancy rate was 4.3%.

Norcross racial composition as of 2020
Race	Num.	Perc.
White (non-Hispanic)	3,342	19.42%
Black or African American (non-Hispanic)	3,370	19.58%
Native American	26	0.15%
Asian	1,920	11.16%
Pacific Islander	15	0.09%
Other/Mixed	603	3.5%
Hispanic or Latino	7,933	46.1%

== Education ==
=== Primary and secondary schools ===
Gwinnett County Public Schools serves Norcross. Each school's respective cluster is listed following its name.

Elementary schools

- Susan O. Stripling Elementary School (Norcross)
- Beaver Ridge Elementary School (Norcross)
- Meadowcreek Elementary School (Meadowcreek)
- Nesbit Elementary School (Meadowcreek)
- Norcross Elementary School (Norcross)
- Rockbridge Elementary School (Meadowcreek)
- Baldwin Elementary School (Norcross)
- Lilburn Elementary School (Meadowcreek)

Middle schools

- Pinckneyville Middle School (Norcross)
- Summerour Middle School (Norcross)

High schools

- Meadowcreek High School (Meadowcreek)
- Norcross High School (Norcross)
- Paul Duke STEM High School (Alternative school for Norcross)
- McClure Health Science High School (Alternative school for Meadowcreek)

Other

- Brenau University Atlanta Campus (Private College)
- Greater Atlanta Christian School (Private School)
- GIVE Center West (Alternative School)
- Ashworth College (Online/Correspondence University)

=== Public libraries ===
Gwinnett County Public Library operates the Norcross Branch in Norcross.

== Economy ==
- Institute of Industrial Engineers, a professional society for industrial engineers
- LSI Corporation, which designs semiconductors and software that accelerate storage and networking in datacenters and mobile networks
- EMS Technologies, specializing in wireless communications
- Waffle House, headquartered in Norcross
- NanoLumens, designer and manufacturer of digital LED displays

== Media ==
The main newspaper of Greater Atlanta is the Atlanta Journal-Constitution.

The Spanish language newspaper El Nuevo Georgia has its headquarters in unincorporated Gwinnett County near Norcross.

== Filming ==
The ABC Studios television show Resurrection was filmed in the town square and all around Norcross.

All Elite Wrestling conducted their television tapings at The Nightmare Factory training facility operated by one of their coach/wrestlers, Q. T. Marshall, in Norcross in March 2020 during the COVID-19 epidemic.

== Transportation ==
=== Major roads ===
- U.S. Route 23
- Interstate 85
- State Route 140
- State Route 141
- Interstate 285 (about 1.5 miles from Gwinnett Village)
- State Route 378

=== Transit systems ===
- Ride Gwinnett serve the city.
- Norcross Greyhound Bus Terminal, 2105 Norcross Pkwy, Norcross, GA 30071

=== Pedestrians and cycling ===
The Western Gwinnett Bikeway, is a multi-use trail along the Peachtree Industrial Boulevard. It is a shared use path, cycle track, and bike lane that connects Norcross to neighboring Duluth.

In September 2015, the Norcross City Council approved plans to do a concept study on developing the Beaver Ruin Creek Greenway. The greenway could serve to connect Norcross residents to the Peachtree Creek Greenway that is being developed in Atlanta, Brookhaven, Chamblee and Doraville.

== Notable people ==
- Jake Camarda, NFL punter for the Tampa Bay Buccaneers
- Jason Croom, NFL tight end
- Chris Herndon, NFL tight end for the New Orleans Saints
- Alvin Kamara, NFL running back for the New Orleans Saints
- Davis Mills, NFL quarterback for the Houston Texans
- Malcolm Brogdon, NBA player, Portland Trail Blazers
- Brandon Boston, NBA player, Los Angeles Clippers
- Wesley Duke, NFL tight end for the Denver Broncos
- Charles Lee Duffy, rapist and serial killer
