= Gwinnett County Public Schools =

School district in Georgia, U.S.

Address
- 437 Old Peachtree Road NW Suwanee, Georgia, 30024-2978; United States
- Coordinates: 34.002°N 84.073°W

District information
- Grades: PK – 12
- Accreditations: Southern Association of Colleges and Schools; Georgia Accrediting Commission
- NCES District ID: 1302550

Students and staff
- Students: 181,814 (2022–23)
- Teachers: 12,254.50 (FTE)
- Student–teacher ratio: 14.84

Other information
- Website: gcpsk12.org

The Gwinnett County Public Schools is a school district operating in Gwinnett County, Georgia, United States. GCPS is the largest school system in Georgia, with over 140 school buildings and an estimated enrollment of over 182,000 students for the 2023–2024 school year. GCPS is estimated to be the 14th largest school district in the U.S. The district has its headquarters near Suwanee.

As of 2020, Niche rates GCPS as A+ and within the top 25 school systems in Georgia. GCPS was awarded the Broad Prize for Urban Education twice, in 2010 and 2014. 2014 was the last year the prize was awarded, GCPS was one of only two school districts to win the prize twice, and GCPS was the first district to have won the prize before and then win it again in its first year of eligibility to again win the prize.

The interim superintendent of the district, Dr. Al Taylor, was elected following the early termination of Calvin J. Watts' contract.

== District boundary ==
The district includes all of Gwinnett County except for the portions in Buford, which are within Buford City School District. The Gwinnett school district's area includes Berkeley Lake, Dacula, Duluth, Grayson, Lawrenceville, Lilburn, Norcross, Peachtree Corners, Snellville, Sugar Hill, Suwanee, and the Gwinnett County portions of Braselton and Loganville. Additionally, the district includes the census-designated place of Mountain Park.

== Schools ==
The district's schools are grouped into 19 geographical attendance zones referred to as "clusters." Each cluster includes at least one high school, for which it is named.

=== Clusters ===
- Archer cluster
  - Cooper Elementary School
  - Harbins Elementary School
  - Lovin Elementary School
  - McConnell Middle School
  - Archer High School
- Berkmar cluster
  - Bethesda Elementary School
  - Corley Elementary School
  - Hopkins Elementary School
  - Kanoheda Elementary School
  - Minor Elementary School
  - Berkmar Middle School
  - Sweetwater Middle School
  - Berkmar High School
- Brookwood cluster
  - Brookwood Elementary School
  - Craig Elementary School
  - Gwin Oaks Elementary School
  - Head Elementary School
  - Alton C. Crews Middle School
  - Five Forks Middle School
  - Brookwood High School
- Central Gwinnett cluster
  - Jenkins Elementary School
  - Lawrenceville Elementary School
  - Simonton Elementary School
  - Winn Holt Elementary School
  - Jordan Middle School
  - Moore Middle School
  - Central Gwinnett High School
- Collins Hill cluster
  - McKendree Elementary School
  - Rock Springs Elementary School
  - Taylor Elementary School
  - Walnut Grove Elementary School
  - Creekland Middle School
  - Collins Hill High School
- Dacula cluster
  - Alcova Elementary School
  - Dacula Elementary School
  - Mulberry Elementary School
  - Dacula Middle School
  - Dacula High School
- Discovery cluster
  - Alford Elementary School
  - Baggett Elementary School
  - Benefield Elementary School
  - Cedar Hill Elementary School
  - Richards Middle School
  - Discovery High School
- Duluth cluster
  - Berkeley Lake Elementary School
  - Chattahoochee Elementary School
  - Chesney Elementary School
  - Harris Elementary School
  - Coleman Middle School
  - Duluth Middle School
  - Duluth High School
- Grayson cluster
  - Grayson Elementary School
  - Pharr Elementary School
  - Starling Elementary School
  - Trip Elementary School
  - Bay Creek Middle School
  - Couch Middle School
  - Grayson High School
- Lanier cluster
  - Sugar Hill Elementary School
  - Sycamore Elementary School
  - White Oak Elementary School
  - Lanier Middle School
  - Lanier High School
- Meadowcreek cluster
  - Ferguson Elementary School
  - Graves Elementary School
  - Lilburn Elementary School
  - Meadowcreek Elementary School
  - Nesbit Elementary School
  - Rockbridge Elementary School
  - Lilburn Middle School
  - Radloff Middle School
  - McClure Health Science High School
  - Meadowcreek High School
- Mill Creek cluster
  - Duncan Creek Elementary School
  - Fort Daniel Elementary School
  - Puckett's Mill Elementary School
  - Osborne Middle School
  - Mill Creek High School
- Mountain View cluster
  - Dyer Elementary School
  - Freeman's Mill Elementary School
  - Woodward Mill Elementary School
  - Twin Rivers Middle School
  - Mountain View High School
- Norcross cluster
  - Baldwin Elementary School
  - Beaver Ridge Elementary School
  - Norcross Elementary School
  - Peachtree Elementary School
  - Simpson Elementary School
  - Stripling Elementary School
  - Pinckneyville Middle School
  - Summerour Middle School
  - Norcross High School
  - Paul Duke STEM High School
- North Gwinnett cluster
  - Level Creek Elementary School
  - Riverside Elementary School
  - Roberts Elementary School
  - Suwanee Elementary School
  - North Gwinnett Middle School
  - North Gwinnett High School
- Parkview cluster
  - Arcado Elementary School
  - Camp Creek Elementary School
  - Knight Elementary School
  - Mountain Park Elementary School
  - Trickum Middle School
  - Parkview High School
- Peachtree Ridge cluster
  - Burnette Elementary School
  - Mason Elementary School
  - Jackson Elementary School
  - Parsons Elementary School
  - Richard Hull Middle School
  - Northbrook Middle School
  - Peachtree Ridge High School
- Seckinger cluster (2022–2023)
  - Harmony Elementary School
  - Ivy Creek Elementary School
  - Patrick Elementary School
  - Jones Middle School
  - Seckinger High School
- Shiloh cluster
  - Anderson-Livsey Elementary School
  - Annistown Elementary School
  - Centerville Elementary School
  - Partee Elementary School
  - Shiloh Elementary School
  - Shiloh Middle School
  - Shiloh High School
- South Gwinnett cluster
  - Britt Elementary School
  - Magill Elementary School
  - Norton Elementary School
  - Rosebud Elementary School
  - Grace Snell Middle School
  - Snellville Middle School
  - South Gwinnett High School

=== Other programs ===
Several schools and programs operate outside of the clusters to serve specific student needs. These include the following:

- ADAPT
- GIVE Center East High School
- GIVE Center East Middle School
- GIVE Center West High School
- GIVE Center West Middle School
- Gwinnett Online Campus
- Gwinnett School of Mathematics, Science, and Technology
- International Transition Center
- Maxwell High School of Technology
- New Life Academy of Excellence Inc.
- North Metro Academy of Performing Arts
- Oakland Meadow School
- Phoenix High School
- STRIVE
- The BRIDGE

== Other facilities ==
The district has its headquarters in an unincorporated area near Suwanee.

== Safety and security ==
The district operates a school police department with full police powers under Georgia law. The department consists of 74 Police Officer Standards and Training certified (P.O.S.T.) armed officers, five full-time office staff members, eight dispatchers, and 24 non-police crossing guards.

The department is divided into four zones: North (including Collins Hill, Discovery, GIVE East, Lanier, North Gwinnett, and Peachtree Ridge), South (including Brookwood, Grayson, Parkview, Shiloh, and South Gwinnett), East (including Archer, Central Gwinnett, Dacula, Mill Creek, and Mountain View), and West (including Berkmar, Duluth, GIVE West, Meadowcreek, and Norcross).

The officers are responsible for mentoring, counseling, education, and event security in addition to their normal duties as school security officers.

== See also ==
- Bown v. Gwinnett County School District
- Franklin v. Gwinnett County Public Schools
- List of school districts in Georgia (U.S. state)
