= Central Gwinnett High School =

Public high school in Lawrenceville, Georgia, United States

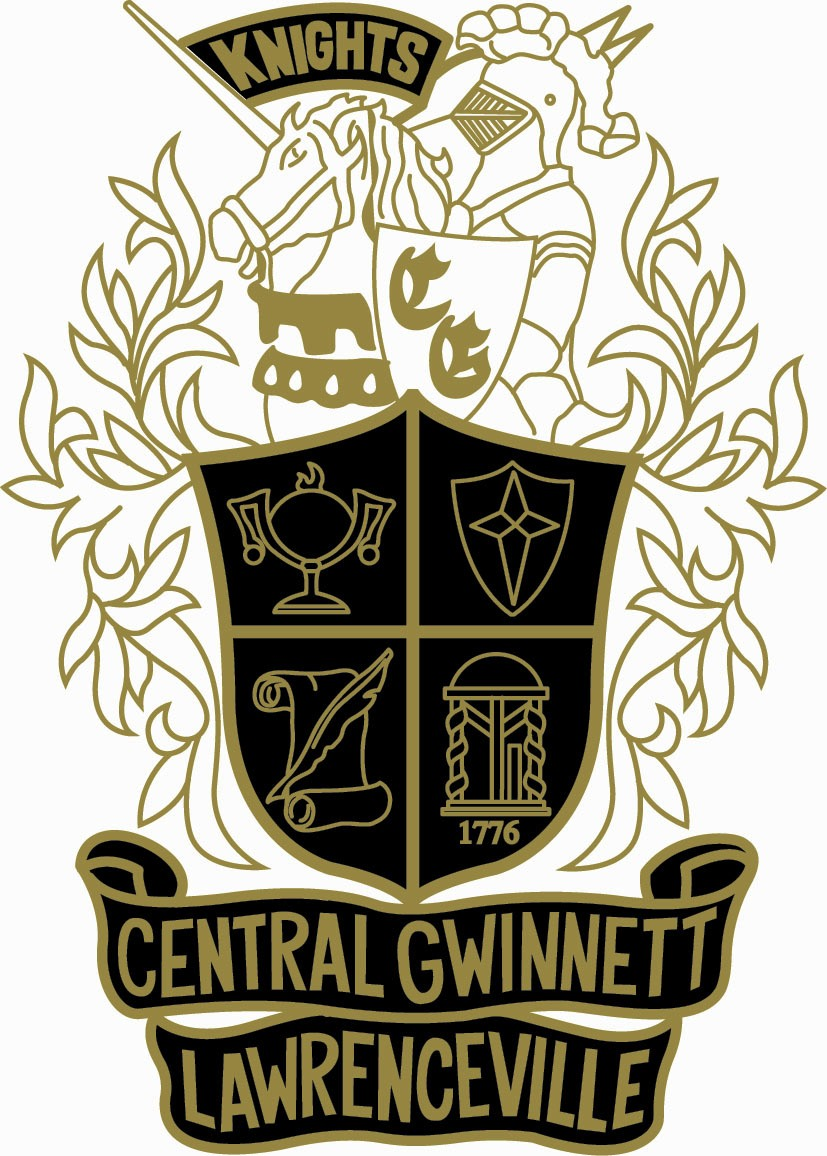

Location
- 564 West Crogan Street; Lawrenceville, Georgia 30046; United States; 33.95058°N 83.99945°W

Information
- Type: Public high school
- Established: 1957
- Principal: Shane Orr
- Teaching staff: 169.00 (FTE)
- Grades: 9–12
- Enrollment: 2,414 (2024–2025)
- Student to teacher ratio: 14.28
- Campus: Suburban
- Colors: Black and gold
- Mascot: The Black Knights
- Website: centralgwinnett.net

Central Gwinnett High School is a public high school in Lawrenceville, Georgia, United States. The school is operated by Gwinnett County Public Schools. Jordan Middle School and Moore Middle School are its feeders.

== Orchestra ==
The Central Gwinnett Orchestra has performed in Orlando, Fort Lauderdale, Washington, D.C., New Orleans, New York City, and on the morning show Good Day Atlanta. In 2007, the orchestra performed in Washington D.C. at the World War II Memorial.

== Notable alumni ==
- EJay Day - singer-songwriter; top 10 finalist in the original season of American Idol
- Nabilah Islam - politician
- Edmund Kugbila - football player
- Jonathan Massaquoi - football player
- Ted Roof - assistant football coach and former college football player
