= List of schools in Georgia (U.S. state) =

This is a list of some schools in the state of Georgia.

== Appling County ==
- Appling County High School

== Atkinson County ==
- Atkinson County High School

== Bacon County ==
- Bacon County High School, Alma

== Baker County ==
- Baker County School, Newton

== Baldwin County ==
- Baldwin High School
- Baldwin Success Academy
- Georgia College Montessori Academy
- Lakeview Academy
- Midway Hills Academy

=== Private schools ===
- John Milledge Academy
- Georgia Military College

== Banks County ==
- Banks County High School, Homer

== Barrow County ==
=== Bethlehem ===
- Bethlehem Christian Academy

=== Winder ===
- Apalachee High School
- Barrow Arts & Sciences Academy
- Winder-Barrow High School

== Bartow County ==
=== Adairsville ===
- Adairsville High School

=== Cartersville ===
- Cass High School
- Woodland High School
- Cartersville High School

== Ben Hill County ==
- Fitzgerald High School, Fitzgerald

== Berrien County ==
- Berrien High School, Nashville

== Bibb County ==
=== High schools ===
- Central High School
- Howard High School
- William S. Hutchings Career Center
- Northeast High School
- Rutland High School
- Southwest Magnet High School
- Westside High School

=== Charter schools ===
- The Academy for Classical Education
- Cirrus Academy Charter School

=== Private schools ===
- Central Fellowship Christian Academy
- Covenant Academy
- First Presbyterian Day School
- Mount de Sales Academy
- Stratford Academy
- Tattnall Square Academy
- Windsor Academy

== Bleckley County ==
- Bleckley County High School, Cochran
- Bleckley County Success Academy

== Brantley County ==
- Brantley County High School

== Brooks County ==
- Brooks County High School

== Bryan County ==
=== Pembroke ===
- Bryan County High School

=== Richmond Hill ===
- Richmond Hill High School

== Bulloch County ==
=== Brooklet ===
- Southeast Bulloch High School

=== Statesboro ===
==== High schools ====
- Statesboro High School
- Charter Conservatory for Liberal Arts and Technology (CCAT (public school district))

==== Private/Charter Schools ====
- Bulloch Academy
- Statesboro STEAM Academy

== Burke County ==
=== Waynesboro ===
- Burke County Alternative School
- Burke County High School

==== Private schools ====
- Edmund Burke Academy
- Faith Christian Academy

== Butts County ==
- Jackson High School

== Calhoun County ==
=== Edison ===
- Calhoun County Middle-High School
- Pataula Charter Academy

== Camden County ==
=== Kingsland ===
- Camden County High School

== Candler County ==
- Metter High School, Metter

== Carroll County ==
=== Bowdon ===
- Bowdon High School

=== Carrollton ===
- Central High School
- Mount Zion High School

=== Temple ===
- Temple High School

=== Villa Rica ===
- Villa Rica High School

=== Carrollton City Schools ===
- Carrollton High School

==== Private schools ====
- Liberty Eagle Academy, Carrollton
- Oak Grove Montessori School, Carrollton
- Oak Mountain Academy, Carrollton

== Catoosa County ==
=== Fort Oglethorpe ===
- Lakeview – Fort Oglethorpe High School

=== Ringgold ===
- Heritage High School
- Ringgold High School

== Charlton County ==
- Charlton County High School

== Chatham County ==
=== Bloomingdale ===
- New Hampstead High School

=== Savannah ===
==== High schools ====
- Alfred E. Beach High School
- Groves High School
- Islands High School
- Jenkins High School
- Savannah Arts Academy
- Savannah Early College High School
- Savannah High School
- Sol C. Johnson High School
- Windsor Forest High School
- Woodville Tompkins Technical & Career High School

==== Charter Schools ====
- Coastal Empire Montessori School
- Oglethorpe Charter School
- Savannah Classical Academy
- Susie King Taylor Community School
- Tybee Island Maritime Academy

==== Private/Charter Schools ====
- Benedictine Military School
- Calvary Day School
- Hancock Day School
- Memorial Day School
- Oglethorpe Charter School
- Rambam Day School
- Saint Andrew's School
- St. Vincent's Academy
- Savannah Christian Preparatory School
- Savannah Country Day School

== Chattahoochee County ==
- Chattahoochee County High School, Cusseta
- Chattahoochee County Educational Center

== Chattooga County ==
=== Summerville ===
- Chattooga High School

=== Trion City School District ===
- Trion High School

== Cherokee County ==
=== Acworth ===
==== Private schools ====
- Furtah Preparatory School

=== Canton ===
==== High schools ====
- Cherokee High School
- Creekview High School
- Sequoyah High School

=== Woodstock ===
==== High schools ====
- Etowah High School
- River Ridge High School
- Woodstock High School

==== Private schools ====
- Cherokee Christian Schools
- CORE Community School
- Lyndon Academy

== Clarke County ==
=== Athens ===
==== High schools ====
- Athens Community Career Academy
- Cedar Shoals High School
- Clarke Central High School
- Classic City High School

==== Private schools ====
- Athens Academy
- Athens Christian School
- Donovan Catholic School
- St. Joseph Catholic Parish School

== Clay County ==
- Students living in Clay County attend high school in nearby Randolph County.

== Clayton County ==
=== College Park ===
- North Clayton High School

=== Forest Park ===
- Forest Park High School
- Unidos Dual Language School

=== Hampton ===
- Lovejoy High School
- White Middle Academy

=== Jonesboro ===
- Jonesboro High School
- Mount Zion High School
- Mundy's Mill High School
- Elite Scholars Academy High

=== Morrow ===
- Morrow High School

=== Riverdale ===
- Charles Drew High School
- Riverdale High School

==== Private schools ====
- Solid Rock Academy

== Clinch County ==
- Clinch County High School, Homerville

== Cobb County ==
=== Acworth ===
- Allatoona High School

=== Austell ===
- South Cobb High School

==== Private schools ====
- The Cumberland School

=== Kennesaw ===
- Harrison High School
- Kennesaw Mountain High School
- North Cobb High School

==== Private/Charter schools ====
- First Baptist Christian School of Kennesaw
- Foundations for the Future School
- Mount Paran Christian School
- North Cobb Christian School
- Northwest Classical Academy
- Princeton Preparatory Schools

=== Mableton ===
- Pebblebrook High School

==== Charter schools ====
- Amana Academy West Atlanta

=== Marietta ===
- Cobb Innovation & Technology Academy
- Kell High School
- Lassiter High School
- Marietta High School
- Osborne High School
- Pope High School
- Sprayberry High School
- Walton High School
- Wheeler High School

==== Private schools ====
- Dominion Christian High School
- Mt. Bethel Christian Academy
- St. Joseph Catholic School
- The Walker School

=== Powder Springs ===
- Hillgrove High School
- McEachern High School

=== Smyrna ===
- Campbell High School

==== Private/Charter schools ====
- International Academy of Smyrna
- St. Benedict's Episcopal School
- Whitefield Academy

== Coffee County ==
=== Douglas ===
- Coffee High School
- George Washington Carver Freshman Campus
- Wiregrass Regional College and Career Academy
- Citizens Christian Academy

== Colquitt County ==
- Colquitt County High School

== Columbia County ==
=== Evans ===
- Evans High School
- Greenbrier High School
- Lakeside High School

=== Grovetown ===
- Grovetown High School

=== Harlem ===
- Harlem High School

==== Private schools ====
- Augusta Christian Schools
- Augusta Preparatory Day School

== Cook County ==
- Cook County High School

== Coweta County ==
=== Newnan ===
- Central Education Center (CEC)
- Newnan High School
- Northgate High School
- Winston Dowdell Academy

==== Private/Charter schools ====
- The Heritage School
- Odyssey Charter School

=== Sharpsburg ===
- East Coweta High School
- Trinity Christian School

== Crawford County ==
- Crawford County High School, Roberta

== Crisp County ==
- Crisp County High School, Cordele

=== Private schools ===
- Crisp Academy

== Dade County ==
- Dade County High School, Trenton

== Dawson County ==
- Dawson County High School, Dawsonville

== Decatur County ==
- Bainbridge High School, Bainbridge

=== Private/Charter schools ===
- Grace Christian Academy
- Spring Creek Charter Academy

== DeKalb County ==
=== Atlanta ===
- Cross Keys High School
- Druid Hills High School
- Lakeside High School
- Ronald McNair Sr. High School

==== Private schools ====
- Ben Franklin Academy
- Marist School
- Mohammed Schools of Atlanta
- The Paideia School
- St. Pius X Catholic High School
- Yeshiva Ohr Yisrael

=== Avondale Estates ===
- DeKalb School of the Arts

=== Chamblee ===
- Chamblee Charter High School
- Warren Technical School

=== Clarkston ===
- Clarkston High School
- DeKalb Early College Academy

=== Decatur ===
- Columbia High School
- DeKalb High School of Technology South
- Flex Academy/William Bradley Bryant Center for Technology
- Southwest DeKalb High School
- Towers High School

==== Private/Charter schools ====
- Academe of the Oaks
- Academy of Scholars
- DeKalb Brilliance Academy
- Friends School of Atlanta
- PEACE Academy
- The Waldorf School of Atlanta

=== Dunwoody ===
- Dunwoody High School

==== Private schools ====
- Dunwoody Christian School

=== Ellenwood ===
- Cedar Grove High School
- Utopian Academy for the Arts

=== Lithonia ===
- Arabia Mountain High School
- Lithonia High School
- Martin Luther King, Jr. High School
- Miller Grove High School

=== Stone Mountain ===
- DeKalb Alternative High School
- Elizabeth Andrews High School
- Redan High School
- Stephenson High School
- Stone Mountain High School

==== Private schools ====
- Greenforest-McCalep Christian Academy
- Smoke Rise Prep School

=== Tucker ===
- Tucker High School

=== City Schools of Decatur ===
- Decatur High School

== Dodge County ==
- Dodge County High School, Eastman

== Dooly County ==
- Dooly County High School, Vienna

== Dougherty County ==
- Dougherty Comprehensive High School
- Monroe Comprehensive High School
- Westover Comprehensive High School

=== Private schools ===
- Byne Christian School
- Deerfield-Windsor School
- Sherwood Christian Academy

== Douglas County ==
=== Douglasville ===
- Chapel Hill High School
- Douglas County High School
- New Manchester High School
- Robert S. Alexander High School

==== Private schools ====
- Harvester Christian Academy
- Heirway Christian Academy

=== Lithia Springs ===
- Lithia Springs High School
- Delta STEAM Academy

== Early County ==
- Southwest Georgia Academy, Damascus

=== Blakely ===
- Early County High School

== Echols County ==
- Echols County School, Statenville

== Effingham County ==
=== Guyton ===
- South Effingham High School

=== Rincon ===
- Effingham College & Career Academy

=== Springfield ===
- Effingham County High School

== Elbert County ==
- Elbert County High School, Elberton

== Emanuel County ==
- David Emanuel Academy, Stillmore

=== Swainsboro ===
- Swainsboro High School

=== Twin City ===
- Emanuel County Institute

== Evans County ==
- Pinewood Christian Academy, Bellville

=== Claxton ===
- Claxton High School

== Fannin County ==
- Fannin County High School, Blue Ridge

== Fayette County ==
- Liberty Tech Charter School, Brooks

=== Fayetteville ===
- Fayette County High School
- Starr's Mill High School
- Whitewater High School

==== Private schools ====
- Grace Christian Academy
- St. Mary's Academy

=== Peachtree City ===
- McIntosh High School

=== Tyrone ===
- Sandy Creek High School

== Floyd County ==
=== Armuchee ===
- Armuchee High School

=== Cave Spring ===
- Georgia School for the Deaf

=== Coosa ===
- Coosa High School

=== Lindale ===
- Pepperell High School

=== Rome ===
- Model High School

==== Private schools ====
- Darlington School
- St. Mary's Catholic School
- Unity Christian School

=== Rome City School District ===
- Rome High School

== Forsyth County ==
=== Cumming ===
- Alliance Academy for Innovation
- Denmark High School
- Forsyth Central High School
- North Forsyth High School
- South Forsyth High School
- West Forsyth High School

==== Private schools ====
- Cornerstone Schools
- Covenant Christian Academy
- Fideles Christian School
- Horizon Christian Academy
- Pinecrest Academy

=== Gainesville ===
- East Forsyth High School

==== Private schools ====
- Lakeview Academy
- Riverside Military Academy

=== Suwanee ===
- Lambert High School

== Franklin County ==
- Franklin County High School

== Fulton County ==
=== Alpharetta Cluster, Alpharetta ===
- Alpharetta High School
- FCS Innovation Academy

=== Banneker Cluster, College Park ===
- Banneker High School
- Crossroads Second Chance South Alternative School

=== Cambridge/Milton Clusters, Milton ===
- Cambridge High School (Georgia)
- Milton High School

=== Centennial Cluster, Roswell ===
- Centennial High School

=== Chattahoochee Cluster, Johns Creek ===
- Chattahoochee High School

=== Creekside Cluster, Fairburn ===
- Creekside High School

=== Johns Creek Cluster, Johns Creek ===
- Johns Creek High School

=== Langston Hughes Cluster, Fairburn ===
- Langston Hughes High School

=== North Springs Cluster, Sandy Springs ===
- North Springs Charter School of Arts and Sciences

=== Northview Cluster, Johns Creek ===
- Northview High School

=== Riverwood Cluster, Sandy Springs ===
- Riverwood High School

=== Roswell Cluster, Roswell ===
- Independence High School
- Roswell High School
- Crossroads Second Chance North Alternative School

=== Tri-Cities Cluster, East Point ===
- Tri-Cities High School

=== Westlake Cluster, Atlanta ===
- Westlake High School
- Frank D. McClarin Success Academy

==== Charter Schools ====
- Chattahoochee Hills Charter School, Chattahoochee Hills
- Hapeville Career Academy, Union City
- Hapeville Charter Middle School, Hapeville
- Riverwood International Charter School, Sandy Springs

=== Alpharetta ===
- Amana Academy Charter School

=== College Park ===
- Atlanta Unbound Academy
- Liberation Academy
- The Main Street Academy
- Resurgence Hall Charter School
- Skyview High School

=== East Point ===
- Fulton Leadership Academy
- KIPP South Fulton Academy

=== Roswell ===
- Fulton Academy of Science & Technology

=== Atlanta Public Schools ===
==== Carver Cluster ====
- The New Schools at Carver

==== Douglass Cluster ====
- Douglass High School

==== Jackson Cluster ====
- Maynard H. Jackson High School

==== Mays Cluster ====
- Benjamin Elijah Mays High School

==== Midtown Cluster ====
- Midtown High School

==== North Atlanta Cluster ====
- North Atlanta High School

==== South Atlanta Cluster ====
- South Atlanta High School

==== Therrell Cluster ====
- Therrell High School

==== Washington Cluster ====
- Washington High School
- H.J. Russell West End Academy
- Hollis Innovation Academy
- Tuskegee Airmen Global Academy

==== Charter/Specialized Schools ====
- Atlanta Classical Academy
- Atlanta Heights Charter School
- The B.E.S.T. Academy
- Coretta Scott King Young Women's Leadership Academy
- Drew Charter School
- Ethos Classical School
- Genesis Innovation Academy
- KIPP Atlanta (Atlanta Collegiate HS, Soul, STRIVE, Vision, WAYS)
- Open Campus High School
- SLAM! Atlanta
- Westside Atlanta Charter School

=== Private Schools - Fulton County ===
==== Alpharetta ====
- Fulton Science Academy Private School
- King's Ridge Christian School
- The Lionheart School
- McGinnis Woods Country Day School
- Rivers Academy
- St. Francis Schools

==== College Park ====
- Woodward Academy
- The Wright School

==== Fairburn ====
- Arlington Christian School
- Landmark Christian School
- Our Lady of Mercy Catholic High School

==== Johns Creek ====
- Mount Pisgah Christian School
- William & Reed Academy

==== Roswell ====
- Blessed Trinity Catholic High School
- The Cottage School
- Eaton Academy
- Fellowship Christian School
- High Meadows School
- St. Francis Schools

==== Sandy Springs ====
- Brandon Hall School
- Mount Vernon Presbyterian School
- Springmont Montessori School
- Weber School

=== Private Schools - Atlanta ===
- Annunciation Day School
- Atlanta Adventist Academy
- Atlanta Girls' School
- Atlanta International School
- Atlanta Jewish Academy
- Atlanta Youth Academy
- Christ the King School
- Cliff Valley School
- Cristo Rey Atlanta Jesuit High School
- Dar-Un-Noor/Atlanta Science Academy
- The Epstein School
- The Galloway School
- The Davis Academy
- Heritage Preparatory School
- Holy Innocents' Episcopal School
- Holy Spirit Preparatory School
- Imhotep Academy
- The Lovett School
- The Mount Vernon School
- The New School
- Pace Academy
- Paideia School
- The Piedmont School of Atlanta
- Southwest Atlanta Christian Academy
- St. Martin's Episcopal School
- Temima High School for Girls
- Torah Day School of Atlanta
- The Westminster Schools

== Gilmer County ==
- Gilmer High School, Ellijay

== Glascock County ==
- Glascock County Consolidated School, Gibson

== Glynn County ==
=== Brunswick ===
==== High schools ====
- Brunswick High School
- Coastal Plains Education Charter High School
- Glynn Academy
- Golden Isles College & Career Academy

==== Private schools ====
- Heritage Christian Academy

==== Private schools ====
- Frederica Academy

== Gordon County ==
=== Calhoun ===
==== High schools ====
- Gordon Central High School
- Gordon County College & Career Academy
- Sonoraville High School

==== Private schools ====
- Georgia-Cumberland Academy

=== Calhoun City School District ===
- Calhoun High School

== Grady County ==
=== Cairo ===
- Cairo High School

== Greene County ==
- Nathanael Greene Academy, Siloam

=== Greensboro ===
- Greene County High School

== Gwinnett County ==
=== Archer Cluster, Lawrenceville ===
- Archer High School

=== Berkmar Cluster, Lilburn ===
- Berkmar High School

=== Brookwood Cluster, Snellville ===
- Brookwood High School

=== Central Gwinnett Cluster, Lawrenceville ===
- Central Gwinnett High School

=== Collins Hill Cluster, Suwanee ===
- Collins Hill High School

=== Dacula Cluster, Dacula ===
- Dacula High School

=== Discovery Cluster, Lawrenceville ===
- Discovery High School (Georgia)

=== Duluth Cluster, Duluth ===
- Duluth High School

=== Grayson Cluster, Grayson, Georgia ===
- Grayson High School

=== Lanier Cluster, Sugar Hill ===
- Lanier High School

=== Meadowcreek Cluster, Norcross and Duluth ===
- Meadowcreek High School
- McClure Health Science High School

=== Mill Creek Cluster, Hoschton ===
- Mill Creek High School

=== Mountain View Cluster, Lawrenceville ===
- Mountain View High School

=== Norcross Cluster, Norcross and Peachtree Corners ===
- Norcross High School
- Paul Duke STEM High School

=== North Gwinnett Cluster, Suwanee ===
- North Gwinnett High School

=== Parkview Cluster, Lilburn ===
- Parkview High School

=== Peachtree Ridge Cluster, Suwanee ===
- Peachtree Ridge High School

=== Seckinger Cluster, Buford ===
- Seckinger High School

=== Shiloh Cluster, Snellville ===
- Shiloh High School

=== South Gwinnett Cluster, Snellville ===
- South Gwinnett High School

=== Specialized/Charter Schools ===
==== Peachtree Corners ====
- North Metro Academy of Performing Arts
- International Charter Academy of Georgia
- New Life Academy of Excellence

==== Duluth ====
- New Life Academy of Excellence
- Yi Hwang Academy of Language Excellence

==== Lawrenceville ====
- GIVE Center East Middle/High School
- Gwinnett School of Mathematics, Science, and Technology
- Maxwell High School of Technology
- Phoenix High School

==== Norcross ====
- BIA Charter School
- GIVE Center West Middle/High School

=== Private Schools ===
- Hebron Christian Academy, Dacula
- Notre Dame Academy, Duluth

==== Lilburn ====
- Parkwood Christian Academy
- Providence Christian Academy

==== Norcross ====
- Al Falah Academy
- Greater Atlanta Christian School

==== Peachtree Corners ====
- Cornerstone Christian Academy
- Wesleyan School

== Habersham County ==
- Tallulah Falls School, Tallulah Falls

=== Mount Airy ===
- Habersham Central High School
- Habersham Ninth Grade Academy

==== Private schools ====
- Trinity Classical School

== Hall County ==
- Chattahoochee Christian School, Clermont

=== Flowery Branch ===
- Cherokee Bluff High School
- Flowery Branch High School

=== Gainesville ===
- Chestatee High School
- East Hall High School
- Gainesville High School
- Howard E. Ivester Early College
- Johnson High School
- Lanier College & Career Academy
- North Hall High School

==== Private schools ====
- Lakeview Academy
- Riverside Military Academy

=== Oakwood ===
- West Hall High School

== Hancock County ==
- Hancock Central High School, Sparta

=== Private schools ===
- John Hancock Academy

== Haralson County ==
=== Tallapoosa ===
- Haralson County High School

=== Bremen City School District ===
- Bremen High School

== Harris County ==
- Harris County High School

== Hart County ==
- Hart County High School

== Heard County ==
- Heard County High School

== Henry County ==
=== Hampton ===
- Dutchtown High School
- Hampton High School

==== Private schools ====
- Bible Baptist Christian School

=== Locust Grove ===
- Locust Grove High School
- Luella High School

==== Private schools ====
- Strong Rock Christian School

=== McDonough ===
- Eagle's Landing High School
- Henry County High School
- McDonough High School
- Ola High School
- Union Grove High School

==== Private schools ====
- Creekside Christian Academy
- Eagle's Landing Christian Academy
- Living Word Christian Academy
- McDonough Methodist Academy
- New Creation Christian Academy

=== Stockbridge ===
- Patrick Henry High School
- Stockbridge High School
- Woodland High School

==== Private schools ====
- Community Christian School

== Houston County ==
=== Kathleen ===
- Veterans High School

=== Perry ===
- Perry High School

==== Private schools ====
- The Westfield School

=== Warner Robins ===
- Houston County Career and Technology Center
- Houston County High School
- Northside High School
- Warner Robins High School

==== Private schools ====
- Sacred Heart Catholic School

== Irwin County ==
- Irwin County High School, Ocilla

== Jackson County ==
=== Commerce ===
- East Jackson Comprehensive High School

=== Jefferson ===
- Empower College & Career Center
- Jackson County Comprehensive High School

== Jasper County ==
- Jasper County High School, Monticello

=== Private schools ===
- Piedmont Academy

== Jeff Davis County ==
- Jeff Davis High School, Hazlehurst

== Jefferson County ==
- Jefferson County High School

=== Private schools ===
- Thomas Jefferson Academy

== Jenkins County ==
- Jenkins County High School, Millen

== Johnson County ==
- Johnson County High School, Wrightsville

== Jones County ==
- Jones College & Career Academy
- Jones County High School

== Lamar County ==
- St. George's Episcopal School, Milner

=== Barnesville ===
- Lamar County Comprehensive High School

== Lanier County ==
- Lanier County High School, Lakeland

== Laurens County ==
=== Dublin ===
- East Laurens High School
- West Laurens High School

==== Private schools ====
- Trinity Christian School

=== Dublin City School District (Georgia) ===
- Dublin High School
- Heart of Georgia College & Career Academy

== Lee County ==
- Lee County High School, Leesburg

== Liberty County ==
=== Hinesville ===
- Bradwell Institute
- Liberty College & Career Academy
- Liberty County High School

==== Private schools ====
- First Presbyterian Christian Academy

== Lincoln County ==
- Lincoln County High School, Lincolnton

== Long County ==
- Long County High School

== Lowndes County ==
=== Valdosta ===
- Lowndes Alternative High School
- Lowndes High School

==== Private/Charter schools ====
- Georgia Christian School
- Highland Christian Academy
- Open Bible Christian School
- Scintilla Charter Academy
- Valwood School

=== Valdosta City School District ===
- Valdosta High School
- Valdosta Early College Academy (6–12)

== Lumpkin County ==
- Lumpkin County High School

== Macon County ==
- Macon County High School, Montezuma

== Madison County ==
=== Danielsville ===
- Broad River College & Career Academy
- Madison County High School

== Marion County ==
- Marion County Middle/High School, Buena Vista

== McDuffie County ==
=== Thomson ===
- Thomson High School
- McDuffie Achievement Academy

== McIntosh County ==
- McIntosh County Academy, Darien

== Meriwether County ==
=== Greenville ===
- Greenville High School

=== Manchester ===
- Manchester High School

== Miller County ==
- Miller County High School, Colquitt

== Mitchell County ==
- Baconton Community Charter School, Baconton

=== Camilla ===
- Mitchell County High School

==== Private schools ====
- Westwood Schools

=== Pelham City School District ===
- Pelham High School

== Monroe County ==
- Mary Persons High School, Forsyth

=== Private schools ===
- Monroe Academy

== Montgomery County ==
- Montgomery County High School, Mount Vernon

== Morgan County ==
- Morgan County Crossroads School
- Morgan County High School, Madison

== Murray County ==
- Murray County High School
- North Murray High School
- Pleasant Valley Innovative School

=== Private schools ===
- Canaanland Christian School

== Muscogee County ==
- Columbus High School
- George Washington Carver High School
- Hardaway High School
- Jordan Vocational High School
- Kendrick High School
- Northside High School
- Shaw High School
- Spencer High School

=== Private schools ===
- Brookstone School
- Calvary Christian School
- Grace Christian School
- Hallie Turner Private School
- Our Lady of Lourdes School
- Pacelli High School
- Pinehurst Christian School
- St. Anne School
- St. Luke School
- Wynnbrook Christian School

== Newton County ==
- Alcovy High School
- Eastside High School
- Newton High School
- Newton County STEAM Academy
- Newton College and Career Academy
- Rise Academy

== Oconee County ==
=== Bogart ===
- North Oconee High School

=== Watkinsville ===
- Oconee County High School

==== Private schools ====
- Athens Academy, Athens
- Prince Avenue Christian School, Bogart
- Westminster Christian Academy, Watkinsville

== Oglethorpe County ==
- Oglethorpe County High School, Lexington

== Paulding County ==
=== Dallas ===
- East Paulding High School
- North Paulding High School
- Paulding County High School

=== Douglasville ===
- South Paulding High School

=== Hiram ===
- Hiram High School

== Peach County ==
- Peach County High School

== Pickens County ==
- Pickens High School

== Pierce County ==
- Pierce County High School

== Pike County ==
- Pike County High School, Zebulon
- Pike Zebulon High School
- Pike County 9th Grade Academy

== Polk County ==
=== Cedartown ===
- Cedartown High School
- Polk County College & Career Academy

=== Rockmart ===
- Rockmart High School

== Pulaski County ==
- Hawkinsville High School, Hawkinsville

== Putnam County ==
- Putnam County High School, Eatonton

=== Private schools ===
- Gatewood Schools

== Quitman County ==
- Quitman County High School, Georgetown

== Rabun County ==
- Rabun Gap-Nacoochee School, Rabun Gap

=== Tiger ===
- Rabun County High School

== Randolph County ==
- Randolph Clay High School, Cuthbert
- Southwest Georgia STEM Charter School

== Richmond County ==
=== Augusta ===
- Academy of Richmond County
- Butler High School
- Cross Creek High School
- Glenn Hills High School
- Lucy Craft Laney High School
- T. W. Josey High School/Marion E. Barnes Career Center
- Westside High School

==== Magnet schools ====
- A. R. Johnson Health Science and Engineering Magnet High School
- C. T. Walker Traditional Magnet School
- John S. Davidson Fine Arts Magnet School
- Richmond County Technical Career Magnet School

==== Private schools ====
- Aquinas High School
- Curtis Baptist High School
- Episcopal Day School
- Westminster Schools of Augusta

=== Hephzibah ===
- Hephzibah High School
- Alternative School at Morgan Road (6–12)
- Georgia School for Innovation and the Classics

== Rockdale County ==
- Heritage High School
- Rockdale Career Academy
- Rockdale County High School
- Rockdale Magnet School for Science and Technology
- Salem High School

=== Private schools ===
- Young Americans Christian School

== Schley County ==
- Schley Middle High School, Ellaville

== Screven County ==
- Screven County High School, Sylvania

=== Private schools ===
- Screven Christian Academy

== Seminole County ==
- Seminole County Middle/High School, Donalsonville

== Spalding County ==
- A.Z. Kelsey Academy
- Griffin High School
- Spalding High School

== Stephens County ==
- Stephens County High School

== Stewart County ==
- Stewart County High School, Lumpkin

== Sumter County ==
(all schools in Americus, Georgia)

- Ignite College and Career Academy
- Sumter Central High School

=== Private/Charter schools ===
- Furlow Charter School
- Southland Academy

== Talbot County ==
- Central Elementary/High School, Talbotton

== Taliaferro County ==
- Taliaferro County Charter School (K-12), Crawfordville

== Tattnall County ==
- Tattnall County High School

== Taylor County ==
- Taylor County High School, Butler

== Telfair County ==
- Telfair County High School, McRae

== Terrell County ==
- Terrell High School, Dawson

=== Private schools ===
- Terrell Academy

== Thomas County ==
- Bishop Hall Charter School
- Thomas County Central High School

=== Thomasville City School District ===
- Thomasville High School
- Thomasville High Scholars Academy

==== Private schools ====
- Brookwood School
- Thomasville Christian School

== Tift County ==
=== Tifton ===
- Tift County High School
- Sixth Street Academy (6–12)

==== Private schools ====
- Grace Baptist Christian School, Tifton
- Providence School of Tifton

== Toombs County ==
- Toombs County High School, Lyons

=== Vidalia City School District ===
- Vidalia Comprehensive High School, Vidalia

==== Private schools ====
- Robert Toombs Christian Academy, Lyons

== Towns County ==
- Towns County High School, Hiawassee

== Treutlen County ==
- Treutlen County Middle/High School

== Troup County ==
=== Hogansville ===
- Callaway High School

=== LaGrange ===
- LaGrange High School
- Thinc Academy
- Troup County Career Center
- Troup County High School

==== Private schools ====
- LaGrange Academy

== Turner County ==
- Turner County High School, Ashburn
- Turner County Specialty School

== Twiggs County ==
- Twiggs County High School, Jeffersonville

=== Private schools ===
- Twiggs Academy

== Union County ==
- Union County High School, Blairsville
- Woody Gap School (K-12)

== Upson County ==
- Upson-Lee High School, Thomaston

== Walker County ==
=== Lafayette ===
- LaFayette High School

=== Rock Spring ===
- Saddle Ridge School

=== Rossville ===
- Ridgeland High School

=== Chickamauga City Schools ===
- Gordon Lee High School

== Walton County ==
=== Loganville ===
- Loganville High School
- Walnut Grove High School

==== Private schools ====
- Loganville Christian Academy

=== Monroe ===
- Monroe Area High School

==== Private schools ====
- George Walton Academy

=== Social Circle City School District ===
- Social Circle High School

== Ware County ==
- Ware County High School
- Ware County Alternative School

== Warren County ==
- Warren County High School

== Washington County ==
- Washington County High School, Sandersville

=== Private schools ===
- Brentwood School

== Wayne County ==
- Wayne County High School

== Webster County ==
- Webster County High School, Preston

== Wheeler County ==
- Wheeler County Middle/High School, Alamo

== White County ==
- Mt. Yonah Elementary School, Sautee

=== Cleveland ===
- White County High School
- Warrior Academy Alternative School

== Whitfield County ==
=== Dalton ===
- Coahulla Creek High School
- Northwest Georgia College & Career Academy
- Phoenix High School
- Southeast High School

==== Private schools ====
- Christian Heritage School

=== Tunnel Hill ===
- Northwest Whitfield High School

=== Dalton City Schools ===
- Dalton High School
- The Dalton Academy

== Wilcox County ==
- Wilcox County High School, Rochelle

== Wilkes County ==
- Washington-Wilkes Comprehensive High School, Washington

== Wilkinson County ==
- Wilkinson County High School, Irwinton

== Worth County ==
- Worth County High School, Sylvester

== See also ==
- List of school districts in Georgia (U.S. state)
