= Cornerstone Schools =

Cornerstone Schools may refer to:

- Cornerstone Schools (Georgia)
- Cornerstone Schools (Michigan)
