= Windsor Academy =

Private Christian school in Bibb County, Georgia, United States

Location
- 4150 Jones Rd; Macon, Georgia 31216; United States; 32°43′52″N 83°41′59″W

Information
- Type: Private Christian
- Established: April 30, 1970 (56 years ago)
- Teaching staff: 20.0 (FTE) (2019–20)
- Grades: KG–12
- Enrollment: 313 (2019–20)
- Student to teacher ratio: 15.6 (2019–20)
- Campus size: 30 acres (12 ha)
- Mascot: Knights
- Accreditations: Southern Association of Independent Schools (SAIS), Southern Association of Colleges and Schools (SACS), AdvancED
- Website: waknights.com

Windsor Academy is a private Christian school in Bibb County, Georgia, United States. The school provides education from preschool to high school, primarily following a liberal arts model with Christian influence.

== History ==
Windsor Academy was founded in 1970 as a segregation academy to serve white students in the area south of Macon. The same year, Tattnall Square Academy, First Presbyterian Day School, and Central Fellowship Christian Academy were founded for the same purpose. Located on Jones Road, it was originally financed by the memberships of ten families.

== Notable alumni ==
- Jason Aldean – country musician
- Nancy Grace – prosecutor, CNN and Court TV host
