= Melody Day =

Melody Day may refer to:

- Melody Day (group), a South Korean girl group
- "Melody Day", a 2007 song by Caribou from Andorra
- Melody Day, superintendent of the Chickamauga City School District in Georgia, United States
