= Leonard Floyd =

American football player (born 1992)

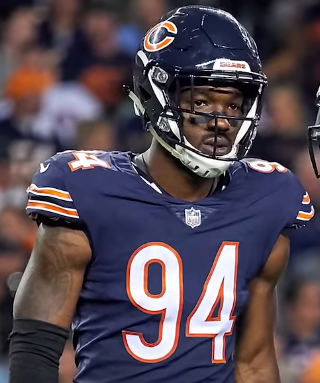
- Floyd with the Chicago Bears in 2018

Profile
- Position: Linebacker

Personal information
- Born: September 8, 1992 (age 34); Chauncey, Georgia, U.S.
- Listed height: 6 ft 6 in (1.98 m)
- Listed weight: 240 lb (109 kg)

Career information
- High school: Dodge County (Eastman, Georgia)
- College: Georgia (2013–2015)
- NFL draft: 2016: 1st round, 9th overall pick

Career history
- Chicago Bears (2016–2019); Los Angeles Rams (2020–2022); Buffalo Bills (2023); San Francisco 49ers (2024); Atlanta Falcons (2025)

Awards and highlights
- Super Bowl champion (LVI); PFWA All-Rookie Team (2016); Second-team All-SEC (2015)

Career NFL statistics as of 2025
- Total tackles: 431
- Sacks: 70.0
- Forced fumbles: 5
- Fumble recoveries: 7
- Pass deflections: 16
- Interceptions: 2
- Defensive touchdowns: 2
- Stats at Pro Football Reference

Leonard Cornilus Floyd (born September 8, 1992) is an American professional football linebacker. He played college football for the Georgia Bulldogs and was selected by the Chicago Bears in the first round of the 2016 NFL draft.

== Early life ==
Floyd attended Dodge County High School in Eastman, Georgia, where he played football and participated in track. In football, he played defensive end and tight end. Floyd committed to play college football at the University of Georgia in April 2011. After high school, he attended Hargrave Military Academy for a year to take classes that met NCAA requirements.

In track & field, Floyd competed as a thrower. He won the shot put event at the 2011 Region 3AA Meet, recording a career-best throw of 14.96 meters.

== College career ==
As a true freshman in 2013, Floyd started eight of 13 games. He finished the season with 55 tackles and a team-leading 6.5 sacks. Floyd played in 11 games during his sophomore season, finishing the year with 55 tackles, six sacks, and a fumble recovery. In a game against the Tennessee Volunteers at Neyland Stadium, Floyd recovered running back Jalen Hurd's fumble and ran it back 96 yards for a touchdown. As a junior in 2015, he played in 13 games with 72 combined tackles, 4.5 sacks, three passes defended, and a fumble recovery. After his junior year, he announced his intentions to enter the 2016 NFL draft.

== Professional career ==
=== Pre-draft ===
Floyd received an invitation to the NFL Combine as a top prospect in the upcoming 2016 NFL draft. He attended the combine and performed the majority of combine drills before injuring his hamstring while running the 40-yard dash. He opted not to perform the bench press and was unable to perform the three-cone drill and short shuttle due to his injury. Coincidentally, teammate and fellow linebacker Jordan Jenkins also injured his hamstring and was unable to do the short shuttle and three-cone drill.

External videos
- Leonard Floyd's NFL Combine Workout
- Leonard Floyd's 40-yard dash

On March 16, 2016, he opted to participate at Georgia's pro day and ran drills for representatives from all 32 NFL teams, including head coaches Bill Belichick (New England Patriots), Rex Ryan (Buffalo Bills), Dan Quinn (Atlanta Falcons), and Todd Bowles (New York Jets) and general managers Thomas Dimitroff (Falcons) and Jerry Reese (New York Giants). Floyd added four pounds to his frame prior to his pro day after there were some teams concerns about his thin frame. He performed positional drills, the short shuttle, three-cone drill, and vertical jump. His vertical (35") was four inches shorter than his jump at the combine and Floyd was also unable to do the bench press due to a pectoral injury. At the conclusion of the pre-draft process, Floyd was a possible top ten pick and a consensus projected first-round pick by NFL draft experts and analysts. He was ranked as the second best linebacker/edge rusher in the draft by NFL analyst Mike Mayock, the third best outside linebacker by NFLDraftScout.com, and was ranked the fifth best linebacker in the draft by Sports Illustrated.

Pre-draft measurables
Height	Weight	Arm length	Hand span	Wingspan	40-yard dash	10-yard split	20-yard split	20-yard shuttle	Three-cone drill	Vertical jump	Broad jump
6 ft 5 5/8 in (1.97 m)	244 lb (111 kg)	33 1/8 in (0.84 m)	10 1/8 in (0.26 m)	6 ft 8 5/8 in (2.05 m)	4.60 s	1.60 s	2.68 s	4.32 s	7.18 s	39.5 in (1.00 m)	10 ft 7 in (3.23 m)
All values from NFL Combine/Pro Day

=== Chicago Bears ===
==== 2016 ====
The Chicago Bears selected Floyd in the first round (ninth overall) of the 2016 NFL draft. The Bears traded the No. 11 overall pick and a fourth-round pick to the Tampa Bay Buccaneers in order to move up to No. 9. On May 27, 2016, the Bears signed Floyd to a four-year, $15.78 million contract that includes $15.33 million guaranteed and a signing bonus of $9.67 million.

External videos
- Bears draft Leonard Floyd 9th overall

He competed with Pernell McPhee, Lamarr Houston, Willie Young, and Sam Acho throughout training camp for a job as the starting outside linebacker. He was named the starting left outside linebacker, opposite Willie Young, to begin the regular season.

He made his professional regular season debut and first career start in the Bears' season opener against the Houston Texans and recorded six combined tackles and was credited with a half a sack on Brock Osweiler during their 23–14 loss. In Week 4, he left the Bears' 17–14 victory over the Detroit Lions after suffering a calf injury. The calf injury sidelined him for the next two games (Weeks 5–6). On October 20, 2016, Floyd recorded three combined tackles, sacked Green Bay Packers quarterback Aaron Rodgers twice, forced the first fumble of his career, and recorded the first defensive touchdown and fumble recovery of his career in the Bears 26–10 loss. During a Week 11 matchup against the Giants, he collected two combined tackles, but left the 22–16 loss in the fourth quarter after colliding with teammate Akiem Hicks while attempting to tackle running back Rashad Jennings. During the collision, the crown of his helmet made impact with Hicks and compressed his neck. He was stretchered off the field and taken immediately to the hospital, but was released later that night. Floyd suffered a head/neck injury and a concussion and was unable to play the next week against the Tennessee Titans . On December 4, 2016, he earned four solo tackles, earned a two sacks on San Francisco 49ers quarterbacks Blaine Gabbert and Colin Kaepernick, and recorded the first safety of his career, as the Bears routed them 26–6. On December 24, 2016, Floyd made one solo tackle, but left the Bears' 41–21 loss to the Washington Redskins after suffering a concussion. The concussion kept him from playing in the Bears' regular season finale against the Minnesota Vikings. Floyd claimed it took two months to recover fully from the concussion and for all the symptoms to subside. Floyd finished his rookie season with 7.0 sacks, which placed him third among all rookies. He finished the 2016 season with 33 combined tackles (23 solo), seven sacks, a forced fumble, fumble recovery, one touchdown, and one safety in 12 games and 12 starts. He was named to the PFWA All-Rookie Team.

==== 2017 ====
Floyd competed for the starting outside linebacker job throughout training camp against Pernell McPhee, Lamarr Houston, and Willie Young. Head coach John Fox named Floyd the starting right outside linebacker to start the season.

On September 28, 2017, Floyd recorded three solo tackles and sacked Packers' quarterback Aaron Rodgers in the Bears' 35–14 loss. On October 9, 2017, he collected a season-high six solo tackles, two sacks, and a safety during a 20–17 loss to the Vikings. The safety came in the first quarter and was on Vikings' quarterback Sam Bradford. On November 19, 2017, he earned five solo tackles before being carted off the field after sustaining a leg injury after he collided with teammate Kyle Fuller in the Bears 27–24 loss to the Lions. On November 23, 2017, the Bears placed him on injured reserve for the remainder of the season after he suffered a sprained MCL and PCL in his right knee. Floyd finished the 2017 season with 34 combined tackles (24 solo), 4.5 sacks, two pass deflections, and a safety in ten games and ten starts.

==== 2018 ====
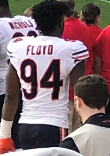
Leonard Floyd in 2018

On November 4, 2018, Floyd intercepted Buffalo Bills quarterback Nathan Peterman, returning it for a 19-yard touchdown, his first-career interception and second-career touchdown. In Week 10 against the Lions, Floyd made his first sack of the season off quarterback Matthew Stafford in the 34–22 win. In Week 15 against the Packers, Floyd sacked Aaron Rodgers two times in a 24–17 win. Floyd finished the season with 49 tackles, four sacks, and a pick six. He was named as a Pro Bowl alternate.

==== 2019 ====
On May 1, 2019, the Bears picked up the fifth-year option on Floyd's contract. In Week 1 against the Packers, Floyd recorded four tackles and sacked Aaron Rodgers twice as the Bears lost 10–3. In week 9 against the Philadelphia Eagles, Floyd sacked Carson Wentz once in the 22–14 loss. This was Floyd's first sack in two months. He finished the 2019 season with three sacks, 40 total tackles (27 solo), and one pass defended.

Floyd was released by the Bears on March 17, 2020.

=== Los Angeles Rams ===
On April 24, 2020, the Los Angeles Rams signed Floyd to a one-year, $10 million contract.

Floyd made his debut with the Rams in Week 1 against the Dallas Cowboys on Sunday Night Football. During the game, Floyd recorded his first sack as a Ram on Dak Prescott in the 20–17 win.

In Week 7 against his former team, the Bears, on Monday Night Football, Floyd recorded two sacks on Nick Foles during the 24–10 win.

In Week 10 against the Seattle Seahawks, Floyd recorded three sacks on Russell Wilson and recovered a fumble lost by Wilson during the 23–16 win, later earning him the NFC Defensive Player of the Week award.

In Week 17 against the Arizona Cardinals, Floyd recorded a sack on Chris Streveler during the 18–7 win. He finished the regular season with a career-high 10.5 sacks, which earned him a $1.25 million bonus.

In the Wild Card Round of the playoffs against the Seahawks, Floyd sacked Russell Wilson two times during the 30–20 win.

==== 2021 ====
On March 15, 2021, Floyd signed a four-year contract extension with the Rams worth $64 million. In Week 14, Floyd recorded eight tackles and intercepted Kyler Murray in a 30–23 win over the Cardinals. In the 2021 season, he had 9.5 sacks, 70 total tackles (37 solo), one interception, three passes defended, and one forced fumble in 17 starts.

Floyd helped the Rams reach Super Bowl LVI where they defeated the Cincinnati Bengals 23–20. Floyd recorded five tackles and one sack in the game.

==== 2022 ====
In the 2022 season, Floyd had nine sacks, 59 total tackles (31 solo), and one fumble recovery in 17 starts.

On March 10, 2023, Floyd was released by the Rams.

=== Buffalo Bills ===
On June 5, 2023, Floyd signed a one-year, $7 million deal with the Bills, with incentives that could increase the value of the contract to $9 million. In his lone season with Buffalo, he finished with 10.5 sacks, 32 total tackles (21 solo), one pass defended, and one forced fumble in 17 games and 16 starts. Floyd also notably laid the sack on New York Jets quarterback Aaron Rodgers that ended the latter's season just four plays into the season opener.

=== San Francisco 49ers ===
On March 18, 2024, Floyd signed a two-year, $20 million contract with the San Francisco 49ers. He started all 17 games in 2024, recording 42 tackles and 8.5 sacks.

On March 12, 2025, Floyd was released by the 49ers.

=== Atlanta Falcons ===
On March 13, 2025, Floyd signed a one-year, $10 million contract with the Atlanta Falcons. He finished the 2025 season with 3.5 sacks, 19 tackles, and one pass defended.

== NFL career statistics ==
Legend
	Won the Super Bowl
**Bold**	Career high

=== Regular season ===
Year	Team	Games		Tackles					Interceptions						Fumbles					
Year	Team	GP	GS	Cmb	Solo	Ast	Sck	TFL	Int	Yds	Avg	Lng	TD	PD	FF	Fum	FR	Yds	TD	Sfty
2016	CHI	12	12	33	23	10	7.0	6	0	0	0.0	0	0	2	**1**	0	1	0	**1**	**1**
2017	CHI	10	10	34	24	10	4.5	8	0	0	0.0	0	0	2	0	0	1	**21**	0	**1**
2018	CHI	16	16	47	34	13	4.0	9	**1**	**19**	**19.0**	**19**	**1**	**4**	0	0	1	0	0	0
2019	CHI	16	16	40	27	13	3.0	3	0	0	0.0	0	0	1	0	0	0	0	0	0
2020	LAR	16	16	55	31	24	**10.5**	**11**	0	0	0.0	0	0	1	**1**	0	**2**	0	0	0
2021	LAR	**17**	**17**	**70**	**37**	**33**	9.5	7	**1**	11	11.0	11	0	3	**1**	0	1	0	0	0
2022	LAR	**17**	**17**	59	31	28	9.0	10	0	0	0.0	0	0	0	0	0	1	0	0	0
2023	BUF	**17**	16	32	21	11	**10.5**	9	0	0	0.0	0	0	1	**1**	0	0	0	0	0
2024	SF	**17**	**17**	42	25	17	8.5	8	0	0	0.0	0	0	1	**1**	0	0	0	0	0
2025	ATL	15	15	19	6	13	3.5	5	0	0	0.0	0	0	1	0	0	0	0	0	0
Career		153	152	431	259	172	70.0	76	2	30	15.0	19	1	16	5	0	7	21	1	2

=== Postseason ===
Year	Team	Games		Tackles					Interceptions						Fumbles				
Year	Team	GP	GS	Cmb	Solo	Ast	Sck	TFL	Int	Yds	Avg	Lng	TD	PD	FF	Fum	FR	Yds	TD
2018	CHI	1	1	3	2	1	1.0	1	0	0	0.0	0	0	**1**	0	0	0	0	0
2020	LAR	2	2	5	3	2	**2.0**	**2**	0	0	0.0	0	0	0	0	0	0	0	0
2021	LAR	**4**	**4**	**12**	**8**	**4**	**2.0**	**2**	0	0	0.0	0	0	0	0	0	0	0	0
2023	BUF	2	2	4	1	3	0.0	0	0	0	0.0	0	0	0	0	0	0	0	0
Career		9	9	24	14	10	5.0	5	0	0	0.0	0	0	1	0	0	0	0	0
