= J. T. Wall =

American football player (born 1979)

Profile
- Position: Fullback

Personal information
- Born: September 12, 1979 (age 47); Milledgeville, Georgia, U.S.
- Listed height: 6 ft 0 in (1.83 m)
- Listed weight: 257 lb (117 kg)

Career information
- College: Georgia
- NFL draft: 2003: 7th round, 242nd overall pick

Career history
- Pittsburgh Steelers (2003–2004)*; Indianapolis Colts (2005)*
- * Offseason or practice squad member only

J. T. Wall (born September 12, 1979) is an American former professional football fullback.

== Early life and college ==
Wall attended John Milledge Academy in Milledgeville, Georgia, where he was a four-year starter at linebacker and fullback. After graduating high school in 1998, he moved on to Southwest Baptist University prior to transferring to the University of Georgia.

== Professional career ==
=== Pittsburgh Steelers ===
Wall was selected in the seventh round, with the 242nd overall pick, of the 2003 NFL draft by the Pittsburgh Steelers. He officially signed with the team on May 28, 2003. He was waived on August 30 and signed to the team's practice squad on September 2, 2003.

Wall re-signed with the Steelers on January 15, 2004. He was waived on September 5 but later signed to the Steelers' practice squad on November 9, 2004. He became a free agent after the 2004 season.

=== Indianapolis Colts ===
Wall signed with the Indianapolis Colts on February 11, 2005. He was waived by the Colts on September 3, 2005.

== Coaching career ==
Wall is now the head football coach at his old high school, John Milledge Academy. Wall has led them to nine Region Championship titles and seven state AAA Championships in 2016, 2019, 2020, 2021, 2022, 2025, and 2026
