= Deerfield-Windsor School =

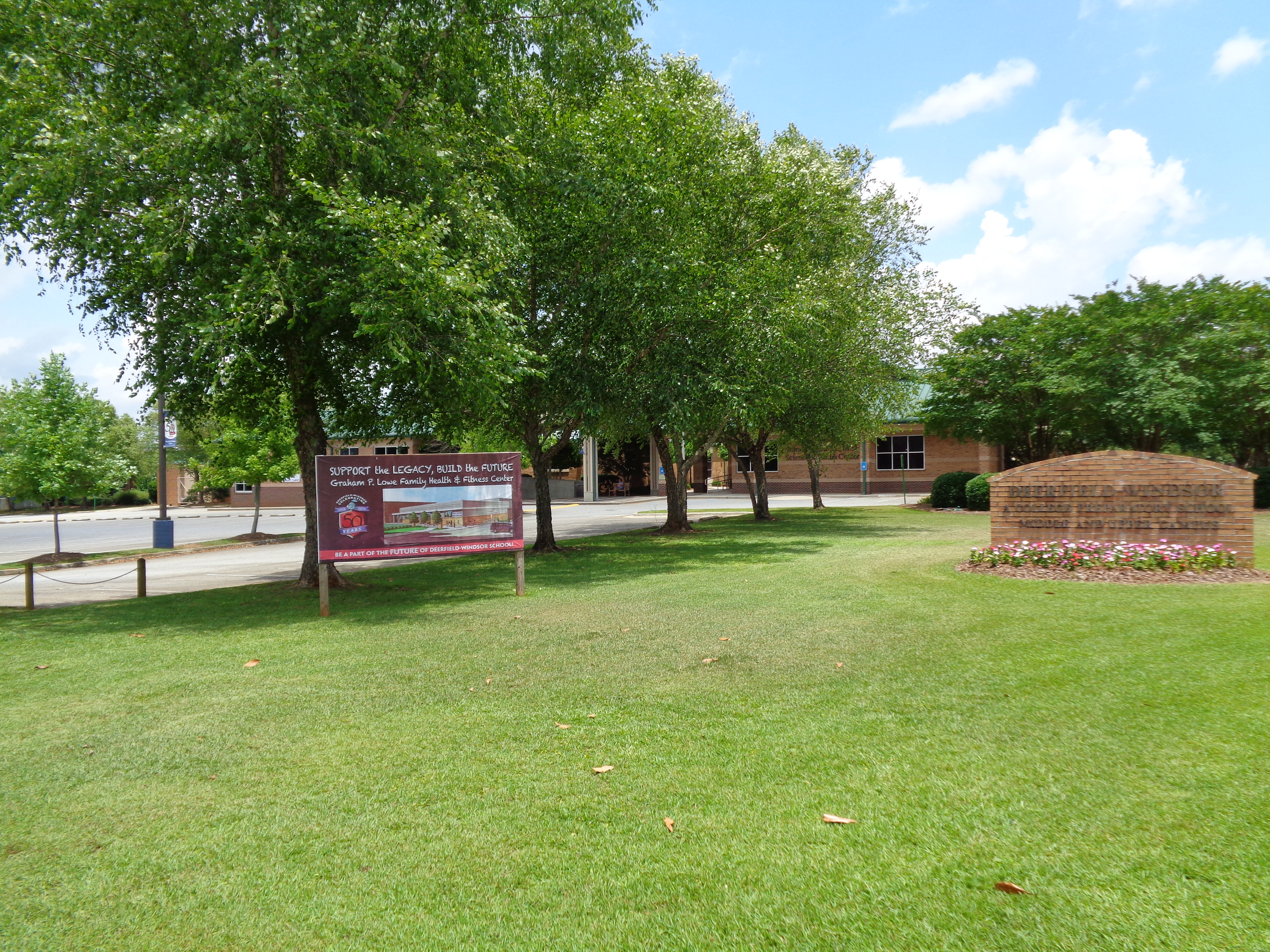

Location
- Albany, Georgia; United States; 31°36′47″N 84°12′9″W

Information
- Type: Independent school
- Motto: Veritas Officium Honestus (Latin for “Truth Duty Honor”)
- Established: 1964
- Headmaster: Allen Lowe
- Grades: PK–12
- Gender: Coeducational
- Enrollment: 538
- Colors: Navy; Red; White
- Athletics: GHSA
- Athletics conference: 1A Region 1 Private
- Mascot: Knights
- Newspaper: The Excelsior
- Yearbook: The Excalibur
- Website: https://www.deerfieldwindsor.com/

Deerfield-Windsor School is an independent K–12 coeducational college preparatory school in Albany, Georgia, United States.

== History ==
Deerfield-Windsor School was founded in 1964 when eight men, led by William T. Bodenhamer, set out to establish a college preparatory school in Albany. They named their school Deerfield. The name Deerfield-Windsor School was chosen as a result of the 1978 merger of Deerfield School and Windsor Park Academy.

The school was founded as a segregation academy, but now has a non-discriminatory admissions policy.

== Athletics ==
Deerfield-Windsor School athletics participate in 3 A Region 1 Private and are members of the Georgia High School Association.

=== Boys ===
- Baseball
- Basketball
- Cross Country
- Football
- Golf
- Soccer
- Swimming & Diving
- Tennis
- Track & Field
- Wrestling

=== Girls ===
- Basketball
- Cheerleading
- Cross Country
- Golf
- Soccer
- Softball
- Swimming & Diving
- Tennis
- Track & Field
- Danceline

== See also ==
- List of schools in Georgia (U.S. state)
