= Darius Marshall =

American football player (born 1989)

Profile
- Position: Running back

Personal information
- Born: February 21, 1989 (age 37); Milledgeville, Georgia
- Listed height: 5 ft 10 in (1.78 m)
- Listed weight: 190 lb (86 kg)

Career information
- High school: Milledgeville (GA) Baldwin
- College: Marshall

Career history
- New Mexico Stars (2012)

Awards and highlights
- 2007 C-USA All-Freshman Team; Second-Team All-Conference USA (2008, 2009)

Darius Marshall (born February 21, 1989) is an American former football running back. He was a member of the New Mexico Stars. Marshall played college football for the Marshall Thundering Herd.

== Early life ==
Darius Marshall was an all-state selection in Georgia in 2005, after rushing for 2,300 yards and 30 touchdowns at Baldwin High School. He earned his consecutive all-state selection in 2006 by rushing for 2,153 yards and 28 touchdowns. Marshall totaled 74 touchdowns in his prep career and was rated one of the Top 50 players in Georgia.

Marshall was recruited by Marshall University, Indiana University, University of Maryland, and Michigan State University. Marshall eventually signed with Marshall.

== Collegiate career ==
=== Freshman season (2007) ===
Darius Marshall began his freshman season in the 31-3 loss to Miami with three rushes for 14 yards and five receptions for 17 yards. Marshall saw his first major action in the 48-23 loss to West Virginia, where he rushed for 80 yards on 11 carries and returned the opening kickoff 77 yards. In the 48-25 loss to New Hampshire, Marshall only totaled 29 yards on 7 carries. In the 40-14 loss to Cincinnati, he recorded 63 yards on seven carries and a reception for 11 yards. In the 24-21 loss to Memphis, Marshall scored his first collegiate rushing touchdown and totaled a season-high 90 yards on 15 carries. In the 38-31 loss to the Tulsa, Marshall rushed 13 times for 63 yards and caught three passes for 25 yards. In the loss to Southern Miss, he rushed 14 times for 62 yards and a touchdown and had a reception for 13 yards. In the first victory of the season, 34-21 over Rice, Marshall totaled 39 yards on 16 carries. Marshall missed most of the loss to UCF, but bounced back in the ECU victory with 67 yards on 12 carries. In the following loss to Houston, Marshall recorded 12 carries for 66 yards. He finished out the season with 60 yards on 9 carries, a 91-yard kick return touchdown, and a 32-yard reception in the 46-39 victory over UAB.

Darius Marshall finished his true freshman season of 2007 with 631 rushing yards and 3 touchdowns in only 123 carries in nine starts. He also caught 14 passes for 119 yards and returned 19 kicks for 556 yards and a touchdown. He led the team with 1,306 all-purpose yards and 108.8 per game en route to being named to the Conference USA All-Freshman Team.

=== Sophomore season (2008) ===
In 2008, Darius Marshall entered the season as the Thundering Herd's starting running back as a sophomore. In the 35-10 season-opening victory over Illinois State, Marshall rushed 20 times for 115 yards and a touchdown. The game marked the sophomore's first career 100-yard rushing game. In the 51-14 loss to the #11 Wisconsin Badgers, Marshall totaled 50 yards and a touchdown on 15 carries. In the 17-16 victory over Memphis, Marshall rushed for a career-high 140 yards on 27 carries with a touchdown. In the following 34-27 victory over Southern Miss, he recorded 112 yards on 30 carries for a touchdown. The game marked the first back-to-back 100-yard rushing games by Marshall in his career.

In the 27-3 loss to West Virginia in the Friends of Coal Bowl, Marshall totaled 45 yards on 16 carries and a career-high 203 return yards on only 4 kick returns, including a 75-yard return. Marshall finished the rivalry game with a career-high 262 total yards of offense. In the 33-10 loss to Cincinnati, Marshall rushed 14 times for 19 yards, a reception for 10 yards, and 5 kick returns for 92 yards. In the following 23-21 loss to UAB, Marshall rushed 9 times for 35 yards, had two receptions for 14 yards, and had 3 kick returns for 80 yards.

Marshall bounced back in the following 37-23 win over Houston, totaling 15 rushes for 102 yards and a touchdown and 63 yards on three kick returns - 165 total yards. He then totaled 123 yards on 20 carries and 88 yards on two kick returns for a total of 201 yards in the next loss to ECU. Marshall then had a season-high 142 yards rushing on 16 carries, to go along with 63 yards on 3 kick returns, in the 30-14 loss to Central Florida. The game marked his second straight 200-yard all-purpose game and his third consecutive 100-yard rushing game. Marshall's 100-yard rushing streak continued in the loss to Rice, in which he gained 118 yards rushing on 24 carries. He also recorded 62 yards on 4 kick returns for a total of 180 yards all-purpose yards. His 100-yard rushing game streak ended at four games against Tulsa - finishing with 94 yards rushing on 18 carries.

Darius Marshall finished his sophomore campaign with 224 rushes for 1,099 yards and 5 touchdowns, 16 receptions for 98 yards, and 30 kick returns for 790 yards - a total of 1,987 all-purpose yards (165.2 yards per game).

=== College statistics ===
			Rushing					Fumbles		Receiving				
Year	Team	G	Att	Yards	AVG	LNG	TD	FUM	LOST	Rec	Yards	Y/R	TD	LNG
2007	Marshall	12	123	631	5.1	34	3			14	119	8.5	0	32
2008	Marshall	12	224	1,099	4.9	61	5			16	98	6.1	0	16
2009	Marshall	10	227	1,131	5.0	80	11			12	27	2.3	0	7
Total		34	574	2,861	5.0	80	19			42	244	5.8	0	32

== Professional career ==
=== NFL draft ===
On January 11, 2010, ESPN college football writer Joe Schad reported that Marshall would forgo his senior season and declare himself eligible for the 2010 NFL draft. Marshall departs with the seventh-best career rushing total (2,857 yards) in Thundering Herd history. Despite having 1,131 yards and 11 touchdowns in his junior season, Marshall was projected to be a late round pick.

=== New Mexico Stars ===
In 2012, Marshall signed with the New Mexico Stars of the Indoor Football League. He was released in April after an altercation.

== Legal troubles ==
In May 2009, Darius Marshall was suspended for the 2009 season opener after being arrested on drug charges with former Thundering Herd teammate DeQuan Bembry. Initially they were charged with possession with intent to deliver, an officer at Western Regional Jail said they both were being held there on $20,000 bond. At a preliminary hearing, later in the month, the felony charges against the Marshall and Bembry were dropped and replaced with misdemeanor marijuana possession of under 15 grams. In April 2012, Marshall was again in trouble with the law, as he was arrested and charged with assault after an altercation that took place after an Indoor Football League game between the New Mexico Stars and the Wyoming Cavalry.
