= Social Circle, Georgia =

City in Georgia, United States

- City
- Flag Seal
- Motto: "Georgia's Greatest Little Town"
- Location in Walton County and the state of Georgia
- Coordinates: 33°39′N 83°43′W
- Country: United States
- State: Georgia
- Counties: Walton, Newton
- named: 1826
- Incorporated: 1832

Government
  - Mayor: David Keener

Area
  - Total: 14.69 sq mi (38.04 km^{2})
  - Land: 14.58 sq mi (37.76 km^{2})
  - Water: 0.11 sq mi (0.28 km^{2})
- Elevation: 890 ft (270 m)

Population (2020)
  - Total: 4,974
  - Density: 341.2/sq mi (131.73/km^{2})
- Time zone: UTC-5 (Eastern (EST))
  - Summer (DST): UTC-4 (EDT)
- ZIP code: 30025
- Area code: 470/678/770
- FIPS code: 13-71660
- GNIS feature ID: 0333086
- Website: socialcirclega.gov

Social Circle is a city in southern Walton County, extending into Newton County, in the U.S. state of Georgia, 45 miles (72 km) east of Atlanta. As of the 2020 census, Social Circle had a population of 4,974.

== History ==
It is unclear why the name "Social Circle" was applied to this place. According to tradition, Social Circle was named from an incident in which a group of people living in the settlement offered water to a weary traveler, whose response was "This certainly is a social circle". The city also officially notes that a citizen of another village community which was already known by the name of Social Circle joined the settlement in its early days.

Social Circle was incorporated as a town in 1869, and as a city in 1904. The city includes a 132 acre historic district.

In 2026, Immigration and Customs Enforcement (ICE) acquired a one-million square foot warehouse in the city. According to city officials, ICE plans to use the structure as an immigrant detention center holding "anywhere from 7,500 to 10,000 detainees". The city shut off and padlocked the water meter to the proposed site until "ICE indicates how water and sewer will be served without exceeding our limited infrastructure capacity". Later, plans were scrapped, yet the warehouse is still there.

== Geographical data ==
According to the United States Census Bureau, the city has a total area of 11.3 square miles (29 km^{2}), of which 11.2 square miles (29 km^{2}) are land and 0.04-square-mile (0.10 km^{2}) is water.

A CSX Transportation line maintenance facility operates in the city's railroad station. The city's railyard contained one of the relatively few remaining concrete coaling towers in the southeastern United States. The coaling tower was removed sometime after June 2022 as it is no longer visible on Google Maps as of February 2023.

== Demographics ==
Historical population
Census	Pop.	Note	%±
1870	405		—
1880	606		49.6%
1890	737		21.6%
1900	1,229		66.8%
1910	1,590		29.4%
1920	1,781		12.0%
1930	1,766		−0.8%
1940	1,735		−1.8%
1950	1,685		−2.9%
1960	1,780		5.6%
1970	1,961		10.2%
1980	2,591		32.1%
1990	2,755		6.3%
2000	3,379		22.6%
2010	4,262		26.1%
2020	4,974		16.7%
2025 (est.)	5,537	▲	11.3%
U.S. Decennial Census; 2025

As of 2025, of the 4,974 people in Social Circle, at least 4,221 people lived in Walton County and at least 41 lived in Newton County.

=== Racial and ethnic composition ===
Social Circle city, Georgia – Racial and ethnic composition Note: the US Census treats Hispanic/Latino as an ethnic category. This table excludes Latinos from the racial categories and assigns them to a separate category. Hispanics/Latinos may be of any race.
Race / Ethnicity (NH = Non-Hispanic)	Pop 2000	Pop 2010	Pop 2020	% 2000	% 2010	% 2020
White alone (NH)	1,889	2,512	2,986	55.90%	58.94%	60.03%
Black or African American alone (NH)	1,396	1,521	1,635	41.31%	35.69%	32.87%
Native American or Alaska Native alone (NH)	2	8	7	0.06%	0.19%	0.14%
Asian alone (NH)	6	24	31	0.18%	0.56%	0.62%
Native Hawaiian or Pacific Islander alone (NH)	0	0	0	0.00%	0.00%	0.00%
Other race alone (NH)	4	10	29	0.12%	0.23%	0.58%
Mixed race or Multiracial (NH)	32	53	168	0.95%	1.24%	3.38%
Hispanic or Latino (any race)	50	134	118	1.48%	3.14%	2.37%
Total	3,379	4,262	4,974	100.00%	100.00%	100.00%

=== 2020 census ===
As of the 2020 census, Social Circle had a population of 4,974. The median age was 36.7 years. 26.6% of residents were under the age of 18 and 16.8% of residents were 65 years of age or older. For every 100 females there were 91.6 males, and for every 100 females age 18 and over there were 84.7 males age 18 and over.

0.0% of residents lived in urban areas, while 100.0% lived in rural areas.

There were 1,769 households in Social Circle, of which 40.1% had children under the age of 18 living in them. Of all households, 46.1% were married-couple households, 15.8% were households with a male householder and no spouse or partner present, and 32.2% were households with a female householder and no spouse or partner present. About 23.9% of all households were made up of individuals and 13.0% had someone living alone who was 65 years of age or older.

There were 1,891 housing units, of which 6.5% were vacant. The homeowner vacancy rate was 1.9% and the rental vacancy rate was 6.0%.

== Education ==
The Social Circle City School District includes all of the city. The district holds pre-school to grade twelve, and consists of two elementary schools, a middle school, and a high school. The district has 90 full-time teachers and over 1,448 students.

- Social Circle Elementary School
- Social Circle Middle School
- Social Circle High School

== Transportation ==
Through highways
SR 11

Nearby highways
I-20
US 278
SR 12
SR 402 (Unsigned Designation for I-20)

== Notable people ==
- Kyle Chandler – actor
- Alonzo F. Herndon – Georgia's first African-American millionaire
- Jay C. (Jack) Higginbotham – jazz trombonist
- Eddie Mapp – country blues harmonicist
- Danny McDevitt – former baseball pitcher, retired here
- Emma Sansom – assisted Nathan Bedford Forrest cross the Black Creek River in Gadsden, Alabama
- Wylly Folk St. John – journalist and novelist

== In popular culture ==
- A season 5 episode of the Discovery Channel series A Haunting, called The Exorcism of Cindy Sauer, takes place in Social Circle in 2010.
- Paramount+ Movie: Jerry and Marge Go Large was filmed mainly in Social Circle.
