= Harrison Bryant =

American football player (born 1998)

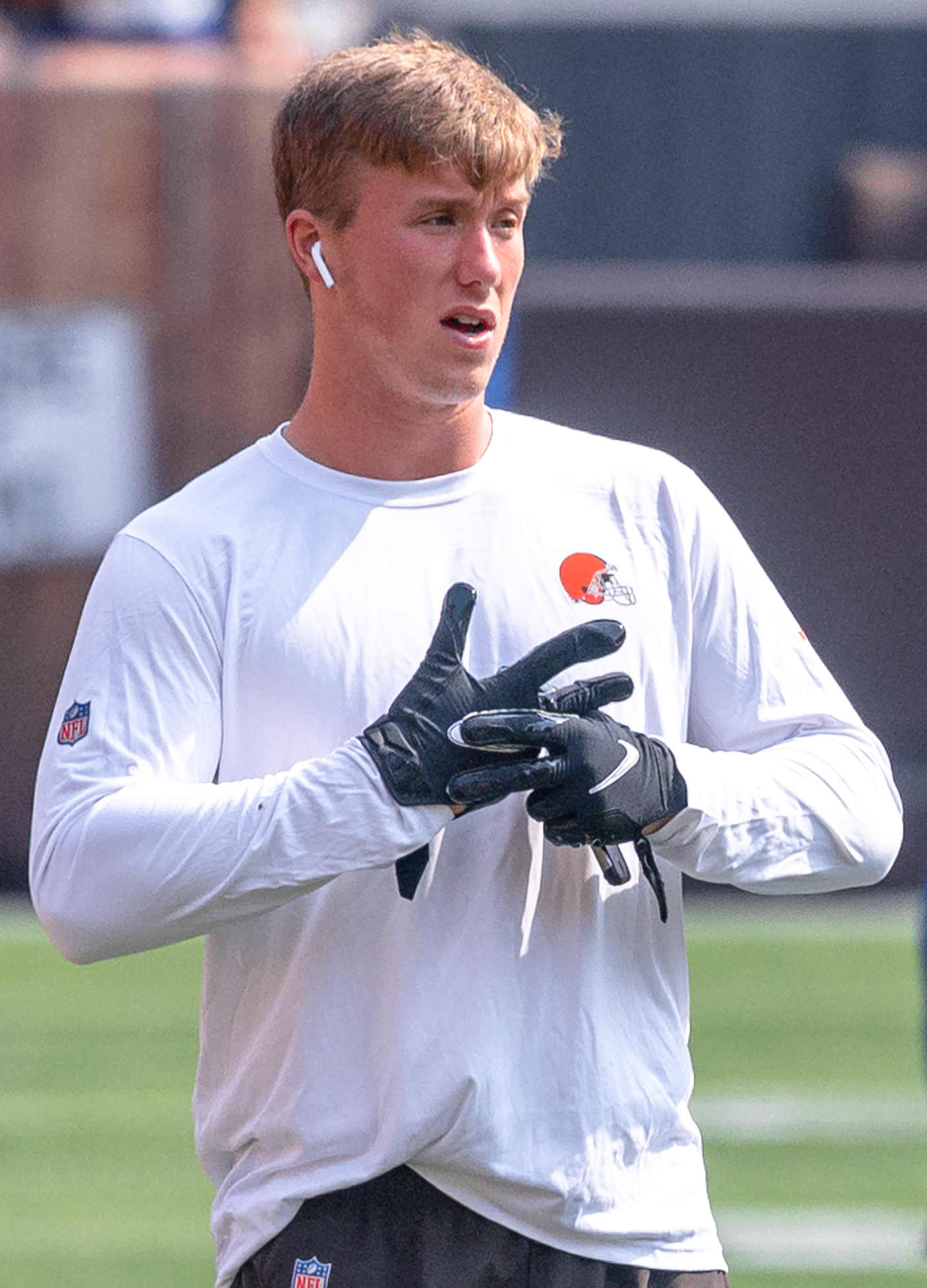
- Bryant with the Cleveland Browns in 2021

No. 83 – Indianapolis Colts
- Position: Tight end
- Roster status: Practice squad

Personal information
- Born: April 23, 1998 (age 28); Macon, Georgia, U.S.
- Listed height: 6 ft 5 in (1.96 m)
- Listed weight: 242 lb (110 kg)

Career information
- High school: John Milledge Academy (Milledgeville, Georgia)
- College: Florida Atlantic (2016–2019)
- NFL draft: 2020: 4th round, 115th overall pick

Career history
- Cleveland Browns (2020–2023); Las Vegas Raiders (2024); Philadelphia Eagles (2025)*; Houston Texans (2025); Seattle Seahawks (2026)*; Indianapolis Colts (2026–present)*
- * Offseason or practice squad member only

Awards and highlights
- PFWA All-Rookie Team (2020); John Mackey Award (2019); Unanimous All-American (2019); 2× First-team All-Conference USA (2018, 2019); Second-team All-Conference USA (2017)

Career NFL statistics as of 2026
- Receptions: 100
- Receiving yards: 884
- Receiving touchdowns: 10
- Stats at Pro Football Reference

Harrison Bryant (born April 23, 1998) is an American professional football tight end for the Indianapolis Colts of the National Football League (NFL). He played college football for the Florida Atlantic Owls, where he was a unanimous All-American and won the John Mackey Award. Bryant was selected by the Cleveland Browns in the fourth round of the 2020 NFL draft.

== Early life ==
Bryant grew up in Gray, Georgia, and attended John Milledge Academy, where he played baseball, basketball, and was a two-way starter for the football team. He originally played offensive tackle before moving to tight end going into his senior year. As a senior, Harrison had 39 receptions for 608 yards and scored 10 touchdowns on offense and 100 tackles with 11 sacks on defense.

== College career ==
As a true freshman, Bryant caught six passes for 63 yards. The following season, he became the Owls starting tight end and finished the year with 32 receptions for 408 yards and five touchdowns and was named second-team All-Conference USA. As a junior, Bryant caught 45 passes for 662 yards and four touchdowns and was named first-team All-Conference.

As a senior, Bryant led all Division I tight ends with 65 receptions and 1,004 receiving yards and had seven touchdown catches. He was again named first-team All-Conference USA and received the John Mackey Award as the nation's best tight end. Bryant was the first player from a Group of Five conference to win the award. He was named a consensus first-team All-American, becoming the first FAU player to do so. Bryant finished his collegiate career with 148 receptions for 2,137 yards and 16 touchdowns.

Bryant participated in the 2020 Senior Bowl, though he did not record a catch.He later attended the NFL Combine.

== Professional career ==
Pre-draft measurables
Height	Weight	Arm length	Hand span	Wingspan	40-yard dash	10-yard split	20-yard split	20-yard shuttle	Three-cone drill	Vertical jump	Broad jump	Bench press
6 ft 4 3/4 in (1.95 m)	243 lb (110 kg)	30 5/8 in (0.78 m)	9 1/2 in (0.24 m)	6 ft 2 in (1.88 m)	4.73 s	1.62 s	2.77 s	4.37 s	7.41 s	32.5 in (0.83 m)	9 ft 2 in (2.79 m)	13 reps
All values from NFL Combine

=== Cleveland Browns ===
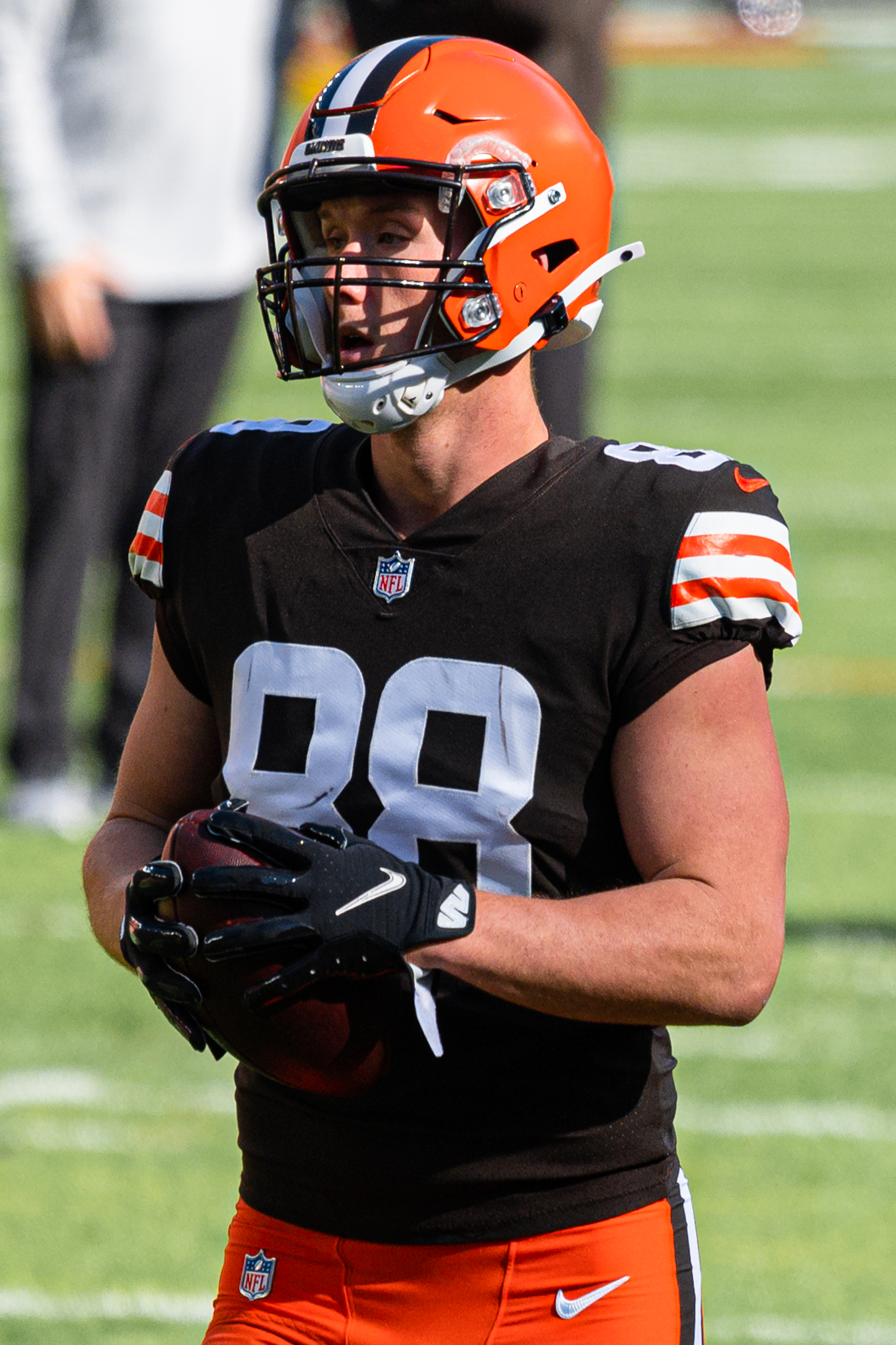
Bryant with the Cleveland Browns in 2021

Bryant was selected by the Cleveland Browns in the fourth round with the 115th overall pick of the 2020 NFL draft. He signed his rookie contract with the Browns on May 20, 2020. Bryant made his professional debut on September 13, 2020, in the season opener against the Baltimore Ravens, catching one pass for five yards. He scored his first career touchdown, a three-yard reception on a pass from Baker Mayfield, on September 27, 2020, in a 34–20 win over the Washington Football Team in Week 3. In Week 7 against the Cincinnati Bengals, he had four receptions for 56 receiving yards and two touchdowns in the 37–34 victory. He became the Browns' first rookie tight end with a multiple-touchdown performance since Harry Holt in 1983. He was placed on the reserve/COVID-19 list by the team on December 29, 2020, and activated on January 9, 2021. Bryant finished his rookie season with 24 receptions for 238 yards and three touchdowns in 15 games played and was named to the PFWA All-Rookie Team.

=== Las Vegas Raiders ===
On March 14, 2024, Bryant signed a one-year contract with the Las Vegas Raiders. In 13 games (three starts) for Las Vegas, Bryant recorded nine receptions for 86 yards.

=== Philadelphia Eagles ===
On March 13, 2025, Bryant signed a one-year, $2 million contract with the Philadelphia Eagles.

=== Houston Texans ===
On August 18, 2025, Bryant and a 2026 fifth-round pick were traded to the Houston Texans in exchange for John Metchie III and a 2026 sixth-round pick. He was released on August 26 as part of final roster cuts, and re-signed to the practice squad. On September 10, Bryant was signed to the active roster. On November 15, he was placed on injured reserve due to neck and shoulder injuries. Bryant was activated on December 13, ahead of the team's Week 15 matchup against the Arizona Cardinals.

=== Seattle Seahawks ===
On April 29, 2026, Bryant signed with the Seattle Seahawks. On July 21, he was waived by the Seahawks.

=== Indianapolis Colts ===
On November 16, 2026, Bryant was signed to the Indianapolis Colts practice squad.

== NFL career statistics ==
=== Regular season ===
Year	Team	Games		Receiving				
Year	Team	GP	GS	Rec	Yds	Avg	Lng	TD
2020	CLE	15	9	24	238	9.9	35	3
2021	CLE	16	3	21	233	11.1	41	3
2022	CLE	17	9	31	239	7.7	30	1
2023	CLE	17	9	13	81	6.2	23	3
2024	LV	13	3	9	86	9.6	18	0
2025	HOU	12	4	2	7	3.5	5	0
Career		90	37	100	884	8.8	41	10

=== Postseason ===
Year	Team	Games		Receiving				
Year	Team	GP	GS	Rec	Yds	Avg	Lng	TD
2020	CLE	2	1	0	0	0.0	0	0
2023	CLE	1	0	4	65	16.3	47	0
2025	HOU	2	1	3	21	7.0	9	0
Career		5	2	7	86	12.3	47	0
