= Durant Brooks =

American football player (born 1985)

- Brooks with the Georgia Tech Yellow Jackets in 2007

No. 14
- Position: Punter

Personal information
- Born: April 15, 1985 (age 41); Macon, Georgia, U.S.
- Listed height: 6 ft 1 in (1.85 m)
- Listed weight: 202 lb (92 kg)

Career information
- High school: Tattnall Square (Macon)
- College: Georgia Military (2003–2004); Georgia Tech (2005–2007)
- NFL draft: 2008: 6th round, 168th overall pick

Career history
- Washington Redskins (2008); Green Bay Packers (2008–2009)*; Philadelphia Eagles (2010)*; Jacksonville Jaguars (2011)*
- * Offseason or practice squad member only

Awards and highlights
- Ray Guy Award (2007); 2× Second-team All-American (2006, 2007); 2× First-team All-ACC (2006, 2007)

Career NFL statistics
- Punts: 26
- Punting yards: 1,030
- Punting average: 39.6
- Longest punt: 60
- Inside 20: 9
- Stats at Pro Football Reference

Durant Stiles Brooks (born April 15, 1985) is an American former professional football player who was a punter in the National Football League (NFL). Brooks played college football for the Georgia Military Bulldogs and Georgia Tech Yellow Jackets, with whom he won the Ray Guy Award in 2007. He was selected by Washington Redskins in the sixth round of the 2008 NFL draft.

Brooks also was a member of the Green Bay Packers, Philadelphia Eagles and Jacksonville Jaguars.

== Early life ==
Brooks attended Tattnall Square Academy in Macon, Georgia, and was a student and a letterman in football and basketball. In football, he was the punter on the 2001 Georgia Independent Schools Association (GISA) Title team. In basketball, he averaged nearly 18 points a game. Brooks graduated from Tattnall in 2003.

== College career ==
=== Georgia Military College ===
Brooks attended Georgia Military College and was a student and a two-year letterman in football. In football, he posted an average of 40 yards per punt over two years. In his senior season, Brooks had an average of 45.3.

=== Georgia Tech ===
After graduating from Georgia Military College, Brooks attended Georgia Tech, punting for the Yellow Jackets as a redshirt junior. In his two years at Georgia Tech, Brooks had 144 punts: nearly half (68) landed inside the 20 yard line, while 57 went for more than 50 yards. His longest punt came in his final ACC game in 2007: playing against North Carolina, Brooks stood at the back of his own end-zone and punted the ball to the opposite 16-yard line—the punt was officially marked as 77 yards (from the line of scrimmage at the seven to the opposite 16), but measured over 90 yards from the spot of the punt.

As a junior, Brooks came in third place for the Ray Guy Award, given to the best punter in the country. He was also named to the All-American second-team by the AP, and the All-ACC first-team.

As a senior, Brooks received the Ray Guy Award, ranking second in the ACC (and fourth in the nation) in punting average while only allowing his opponents to return 19 of his 65 punts. That year, he was also named to the All-American second-team by AP (first-team by Sports Illustrated and Rivals) and the All-ACC first-team.

== Professional career ==
=== Washington Redskins ===
Brooks was selected by the Washington Redskins in the sixth round (168th overall) of the 2008 NFL draft. He signed a four-year contract with the Redskins on July 11. Brooks won the punting job over Derrick Frost, who was released on August 30.

After week 6 of the 2008 NFL season reports surfaced that Brooks was to be replaced by a veteran due to his poor performance. His gross average of 39.6 yards and net average of 32.1 yards were last in the NFL at the time. On October 15, the Redskins signed punter Ryan Plackemeier, effectively ending Brooks' tenure with the team.

=== Green Bay Packers ===
Brooks was signed to the practice squad of the Green Bay Packers on December 15, 2008, after running back Steven Korte was released. He was re-signed to a future contract at the end of the season. The Packers released Brooks on August 31, 2009, after he lost the punting job to Jeremy Kapinos.

=== Philadelphia Eagles ===
After spending the 2009 season out of football, Brooks signed a two-year contract with the Philadelphia Eagles on February 2, 2010. He was expected to compete with Sav Rocca for the starting punter job, but was waived on May 25.

=== Jacksonville Jaguars ===
Brooks signed with the Jacksonville Jaguars on August 5, 2010, but was waived a week later on August 12.
