= Baldwin High School (Georgia) =

Public school in Georgia, United States

Location
- 155 Highway 49W; Milledgeville, Georgia 31061; United States; 33°04′22″N 83°15′01″W

Information
- Type: Public high school
- Motto: "Be Brave, Be Honorable, and Be Successful"
- Established: 1957 (69 years ago)
- School district: Baldwin County School District
- CEEB code: 112094
- Principal: Markeeta Clayton
- Teaching staff: 77.00 (FTE)
- Grades: 9-12
- Age range: 14-19
- Enrollment: 1,283 (2025-2026)
- Student to teacher ratio: 16.66
- Colors: Red, black, white
- Mascot: Brave
- Website: baldwincountyschoolsga.org/baldwin-high

Baldwin High School (BHS) stands at 155 Highway 49 West in Milledgeville, Georgia. Over the years, the school has expanded significantly, with notable additions since 2003 including a dedicated classroom wing, a JROTC building, a fine arts wing, a new cafeteria and a vocational building. As the only public high school in Baldwin County, it is also the largest of the 3 high schools in the area. The other two schools, John Milledge Academy and Georgia Military College, are private institutions.

== Mascot controversy ==
In late 2015, the Baldwin County Board of Education created a Mascot Advisory Committee to evaluate the appropriateness of the "Braves" mascot. After months of thorough discussion and deliberation, the board opted to keep the "Braves" name while making the decision to eliminate certain stereotypical imagery associated with it. This move reflected an effort to address cultural sensitivity while preserving the mascot's identity.

== Notable alumni ==
- Javon Bullard, NFL defensive back for the Green Bay Packers. He played college football at the University of Georgia, winning two back-to-back CFP National Championships.
- Tasha Butts, former basketball standout for the University of Tennessee Lady Volunteers and collegiate coach for the UCLA Bruins and the Louisiana State University Lady Tigers.
- Earnest Byner, a former NFL running back who played for the Cleveland Browns, Washington Redskins, and Baltimore Ravens. Byner also served as a coach for the Ravens and Tennessee Titans, earning accolades like a Super Bowl ring.
- Lisa D. Cook, Distinguished economist serving as a Member of the Federal Reserve Board of Governors.
- Nick Harper, former NFL cornerback who played nine seasons for the Tennessee Titans and Indianapolis Colts. He won Super Bowl XLI with the Colts.
- Leroy Hill, former NFL linebacker who played his entire career with the Seattle Seahawks. He played college football at Clemson University and started in Super Bowl XL.
- Maurice Hurt, former NFL offensive guard for the Washington Redskins. He played college football at the University of Florida, winning two BCS National Championships.
- Darius Marshall, standout college running back at Marshall University. He finished his collegiate career ranked among the top rushers in the nation for the Thundering Herd.
- Otis Murphy, internationally renowned classical saxophonist and professor of saxophone at Indiana University's Jacobs School of Music.
- Barry Reese, prolific author known for his modern pulp adventure novels and contributions to Marvel Comics.
- Audra Smith, longtime women's college basketball coach. She served as head coach for University of Alabama at Birmingham, Clemson University, and South Carolina State University. Smith also played basketball at the University of Virginia.
- Malcolm Thomas, former professional basketball player drafted into the NBA in 1979. He played college basketball for the University of Missouri.
- Micah Welch, current college football running back for the University of Colorado Buffaloes.
