= Thomasville City School District =

School district in Georgia (U.S. state)

Thomasville City Schools

Address
- 404 N. Broad St., Ste 3 Thomasville, Thomas, Georgia, 31792; United States

District information
- Grades: Pre-school - 12

Students and staff
- Enrollment: 3,107
- Faculty: 204

Other information
- Website: www.tcitys.org

Thomasville City Schools is a public school district in Thomasville, Georgia, United States, based in Thomasville. It serves the city of Thomasville

== Schools ==
The Thomasville City Schools has three elementary schools, one middle school, and one high school.

=== Elementary schools ===
- Jerger Elementary School (PreK - 5)
- Harper Elementary School (PreK -5)
- Scott Elementary School (PreK - 5)

=== Middle school ===
- MacIntyre Park Middle School (6-8)

=== High school ===
- Thomasville High School (9-12)
