= Gordon Lee High School =

Public high school in Chickamauga, Georgia, United States

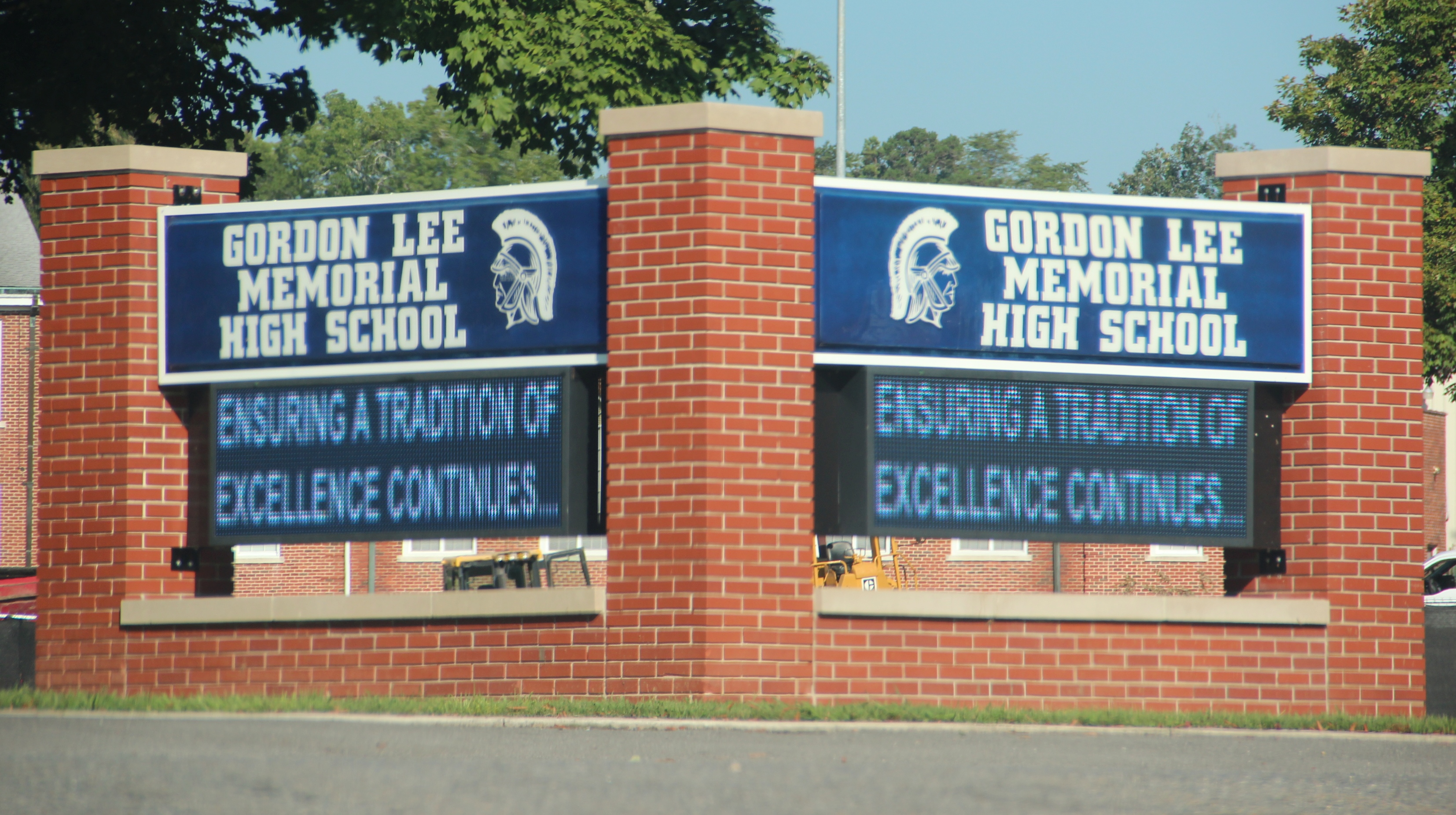
- Gordon Lee High School in 2016

Location
- 105 Lee Circle; Chickamauga, Georgia 30707-1426; United States; 34.869342°N 85.294289°W

Information
- School type: Public
- Established: 1930
- School district: Chickamauga City School District
- Principal: Michael Langston
- Teaching staff: 28.90 (FTE)
- Grades: 9 – 12
- Enrollment: 410 (2024-2025)
- Student to teacher ratio: 14.19
- Classes offered: Traditional college prep curriculum includes Advanced Placement courses in English, Social Studies, Math, and Science. Vocational program includes Business, Agriculture, Construction, Technology, and Drafting.
- Campus size: 50 acres (200,000 m^{2})
- Colors: Navy and white
- Athletics: Baseball, football, softball, volleyball, boys' and girls' basketball, wrestling, boys' and girls' golf, tennis, track, cheerleading
- Athletics conference: 6-A
- Mascot: Trojan
- Team name: Trojans
- Rival: Trion High School
- National ranking: unranked
- Telephone: 706 375 5882
- Fax: (706) 375-5881
- Website: glhs.glschools.org

Gordon Lee Memorial High School (GLHS) is a four-year public high school located in Chickamauga, Georgia, United States. It is part of the Chickamauga City School District, which serves the City of Chickamauga in Walker County.

== History ==
The late Gordon Lee of Chickamauga left a grant of a plot of land and enough money to start the school.

The first graduation consisted of one student, Leon Wiley, in 1917.

The Main Building, Olive Lee Building, and Tom Lee Building were constructed in 1930.

The Ware-Jewell Activities Center holds a gymnasium, classrooms, and a technology lab. The center also harbors the Arthur Yates Building, which contains math and science classrooms.

Since 1991, Gordon Lee High School and Gordon Lee Middle School have shared a band room and cafeteria.

Construction of an extension to the gymnasium which includes new classrooms was completed during the 2013-2014 school year.

In August 2016, construction began to build a new school building.

== Demographics ==
White: 98.3%, Asian: 0%, Hispanic: 0.6%, Black: 0%, Two or More Races: 1.1%, American Indian: 0%.

== Athletics ==
The Gordon Lee Trojans compete in the 6-A GHSA Conference. Gordon Lee has the following sports teams.

- Baseball
- Basketball
- Bass Fishing
- Cheerleading
- Cross Country
- Football
- Golf
- Softball
- Tennis
- Track
- Volleyball
- Wrestling

== Notable alumni ==
- Jeff Mullis - former Georgia state senator
- Steve Tarvin - Georgia state representative
