= Social Circle High School =

Public high school in Social Circle, Georgia, United States

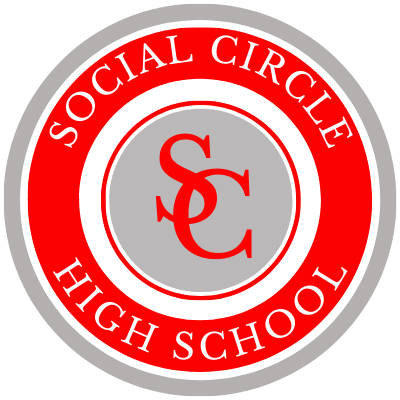

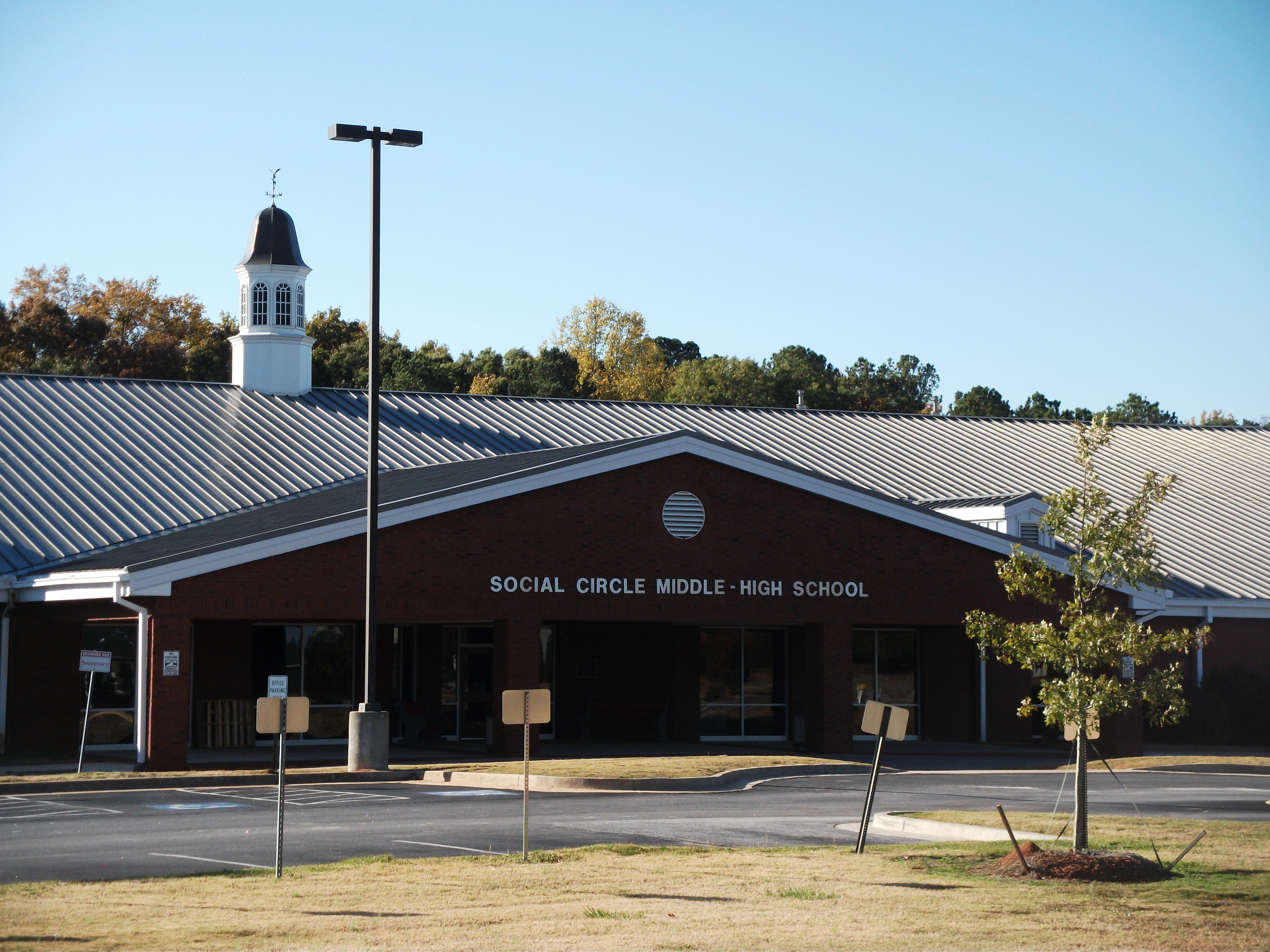
- Social Circle High School in 2011

Location
- 154 Alcova Drive; Social Circle, Georgia 30025-4350; United States
- 33.66047°N 83.72653°W

Information
- Type: Comprehensive public high school
- School district: Social Circle City School District
- CEEB code: 112765
- Principal: Tim Armstrong
- Teaching staff: 41.00 (FTE)
- Grades: 9–12
- Enrollment: 579 (2023–2024)
- Student to teacher ratio: 14.12
- Campus type: Rural
- Colors: Red and White
- Mascot: Redskin
- Feeder schools: Social Circle Middle School
- Website: high.socialcircleschools.com

Social Circle High School is a public school facility serving grades 9-12. It operates under the Social Circle City School District, within the city of Social Circle, in the extreme southern portion of Walton County, Georgia, United States. Its current principal is Tim Armstrong.

== Athletics ==
The Social Circle Redskins compete in Region 8-A Public of the Georgia High School Association.

Social Circle High Currently competes in the following athletic disciplines

- Football
- Competitive and Spirit Cheerleading
- Cross Country
- Softball
- Volleyball
- Rifle
- Swimming
- Basketball
- Wrestling
- Baseball
- Soccer
- Track & Field
- Golf
- Tennis
