= Dodge County High School =

Location
- 350 Pearl Bates Road; Eastman, Georgia 31023-9802; United States; 32.196723°N 83.195166°W

Information
- School district: Dodge County School District
- Principal: Marcie Jones
- Teaching staff: 53.80 FTE
- Grades: 9-12
- Enrollment: 820 (2023-2024)
- Student to teacher ratio: 15.24
- Colors: Red and white
- Fight song: "Hail to the Indians"
- Athletics: GHSA
- Athletics conference: 3 AA
- Sports: Basketball, Baseball, Cross Country, E-Sports, Golf, Football, Tennis, Track, Soccer, Softball, Wrestling
- Mascot: Indian
- Nickname: Big Red
- Team name: Indians
- Rival: Bleckley County High School; Dublin High School
- Accreditation: Southern Association of Colleges and Schools Georgia Accrediting Commission
- Newspaper: Tribe Scribe
- Yearbook: Chieftain
- Feeder schools: Dodge County Middle School
- Telephone: (478) 374-7711
- Fax: (478) 374-6987
- Newsletter: Tribe Scribe
- Website: https://dhs.dodge.k12.ga.us/

Dodge County High School is a public high school located in Eastman, Georgia, United States. The school is part of the Dodge County School District, which serves Dodge County.

== Overview ==
Dodge County High School is a SACS (Southern Association of Colleges and Schools) and GAC (Georgia Accrediting Commission) accredited school, where students can work towards a College Prep, College Prep Plus, Tech Prep, Tech Prep Plus, or Community Achievement Program diploma. Course work within these areas may include programs such as EMAC (Educational Media Academic Courses), which consists of foreign language offerings in Latin, German, and Japanese, and often involves video or phone lessons.

The Georgia Accel Program offers post-secondary options with Middle Georgia College and Georgia Aviation and Technical College. Apprenticeship programs are offered to students pursuing a Tech Prep or Tech Prep Plus diploma. Apprenticeship areas include teacher cadet, child care, heating and air, aircraft-sheet metal, and health occupations, and are offered through dual enrollment with Heart of Georgia Technical College. The Instructional Support Department offers special education students the opportunity to get work site experience in addition to their regular courses of study.

== Athletics ==
- Archery
- Baseball
- Basketball cheerleading
- Basketball (boys' and girls')
- Competition/Football Cheerleading
- Cross country (boys' and girls')
- Fast pitch softball
- Flag Football (girls')
- Football
- Golf (boys' and girls')
- Slow pitch softball
- Soccer (boys' and girls')
- Tennis (boys' and girls')
- Track & field (boys' and girls')
- Wrestling

=== Football ===
Dodge County High School has had two former football players make it to the NFL. Benji Roland played for the Tampa Bay Buccaneers in 1990 as defensive end. He was also part of the 1988 College Football All-America Team, played for Auburn University, and made it into the 1989 NFL draft. The other notable player is Leonard Floyd of the Atlanta Falcons. He played college football at The University of Georgia where he played outside linebacker, and later was drafted 9th overall in the 2016 NFL draft after declaring early as a junior.

Regional titles

| Year | Region | 2016 | 5A AA | 2015 | 5A AA | 2014 | 5A Aa | 2013 | 5A AAA | 2012 | 5A AAA | 2011 | 5A AAA | 2009 | 5A AA | 1999 | 4 AA |
| 1996 | 3 AA | | | | | | | | | | | | | | | | |
| 1995 | 3 AA | | | | | | | | | | | | | | | | |
| 1976 | 3 AA | | | | | | | | | | | | | | | | |

== Clubs and activities ==
- 4-H
- Academic Bowl
- Advanced Placement
- Aerospace
- Anchor Club
- Annual Staff
- Art Club
- Beta Club
- Business Law Club
- DCHS Marching Chiefs, Concert Band, Dance Line, Flag Corps
- DCHS Choraliers/Chorus
- Debate Team
- FBLA (Future Business Leaders of America)
- FCA (Fellowship of Christian Athletes)
- FCCLA (Family, Career, and Community Leaders of America)
- FFA (Future Farmers of America)
- French Club
- Garden Club
- GGFC (Girls & Guys For Christ)
- Gifted Education
- Global Achievers
- Improv Troupe
- Interact Club
- JROTC
- Junior Beta Club
- Key Club
- National Forensics League
- One-Act Play
- Science Club
- SERC
- SkillsUSA
- Spanish Club
- Spirit Club
- Spring Literary
- Student Council and Class Officers
- Tribe Scribe
- TSA (Technology Student Association)
- Wee Injuns
- Y-Club & YFA (Youth for Action)
- YAL (Youth Advocacy Leadership)
- YAP (Youth Apprenticeship Program)

== Notable alumni ==
- Leonard Floyd - outside linebacker/defensive end (Atlanta Falcons), 9th overall selection of 2016 NFL draft
