= St. Luke School (Georgia) =

Coordinates: 32.46636°N 84.98815°W

St. Luke School is a K–8 private, coeducational, college-preparatory day school located in Columbus, Georgia, United States. The school was established in 1998 by members of St. Luke Church. St. Luke School is accredited by AdvancED/Southern Association of Colleges and Schools (SACS).
