= Thomasville High School =

Public secondary school in Thomasville, Georgia, United States

Location
- 315 South Hansell Street; Thomasville, Georgia 31792; United States; 30°50′25″N 83°58′16″W

Information
- Type: Public
- Motto: Be Respectful, Responsible, and Ready to Learn
- School district: Thomasville City Schools
- CEEB code: 112980
- Principal: Bryson Daniels
- Teaching staff: 51.20 (on FTE basis)
- Grades: 9–12
- Enrollment: 745 (2023–2024)
- Student to teacher ratio: 14.55
- Colors: Red and gold
- Athletics conference: GHSA Region 1 Class A
- Mascot: Bulldog
- Website: http://ths.tcitys.org

Thomasville High School is a public secondary school located in Thomasville, Georgia, United States. It is one of only a handful of city school systems left in the state of Georgia. It is considered by the Georgia High School Association to be an AA school system.

== Sports ==
Thomasville High School is known for its football program. When the program began in 1910, the team was known as the Thomasville Red Cyclones. This changed in 1923, when they were given permission by the University of Georgia to use the Bulldog mascot.

The school colors were initially red and black. These did not change until segregation came to an end, and the school merged with Douglass High School and took on the color gold, while doing away with black.

In 114 years of football, the school has one high school football national championship (1974), and five state championships (1945, 1958 co-champs, 1973, 1974, 1988). They have also won 31 region titles, with their most recent coming in 2022. During the 2017 season, the Bulldogs went 12-1 and notched the program's 700th win when they defeated cross-town rival Thomas County Central High School. The Bulldogs made the Semifinals in 2019 after starting 0-3 and finishing 6-4 and winning another region championship, losing to the eventual state champions. During the 2021 season, the Bulldogs won their 31st region title and made it to the GHSA Class AA State Championship Game eventually losing to the Fitzgerald High School Purple Hurricanes to a final score of 21-7. They finished the season with a 13-2 record and made it their first state title appearance since 1993. In 2022, the Bulldogs won back-to-back region titles for the first time since ‘04 and ‘05 (18 years) and made the GHSA Playoff Quarterfinals.

Thomas County Central High School and Cairo High School are their primary rivals. While there was a suspension of the two series in the late 1990s, the rivalries has recently been picked back up and occurs in early part of the season each year.

The school has produced major college and NFL players including William Andrews, Mike Bobo, Shawn Jones, Mike Jones (University of Georgia), Charles Bostick (Georgia Southern University), Eric Curry, Guy McIntyre, Sheddrick Wilson (Louisiana State and Houston Oilers) and Brandon Thompson of the Cincinnati Bengals.

The school won a state baseball championship in 1999. Levale Speigner was part of the 1999 team, and he has gone on to play professional baseball.

The school won a state soccer championship in 2010. They were the Area 2 AA/A champions, as well with an overall record of 19-0-4, the school's first undefeated season. They scored 100 goals and allowed 15 on the season. They ended the season #1 in division AA/A, ranked #8 overall in the state and ranked #47 nationally.

The school also contains a notable tennis team. It is often regarded as one of the best public school teams in GHSA AA. The team has reached the final four 9 times, 5 for the boys team and 4 for the girls team. The team was headed by Phil Slaughter for nearly 20 years and is now led by Kelli Helms. In 2016, they defeated three-time GISA state champion Brookwood. The team most recently went to the final four in 2017. The boys team had final four appearances in 2005, 2006, 2013, 2014, and 2017. The girls team reached the final four in 1996 (AAA), 1998, 2008, and 2014. The team has a combined 13 trips that ended in the elite 8 (more than their 4 combined sweet 16 trips in 2000, 2006, and 2009). The only time the boys team made it to the Sweet 16 was in 2010.

The Boys team won region 1-2A championships most recently in 2014, 2015, 2016, and 2017.

During the 1974 season, the Thomasville Doubles team of Virginia Balfour and Greer Becknell attained the title of AAA State Runner-Up. 5 other doubles teams reached the final four in the sixties and seventies. These teams were Ann Rumble and Penny Dollar (1969), Virginia Balfour and Greer Becknell (1972), Dayna Leak and Donna Leak (1977), Charles Weir and John Everett (1980).

Two singles players for the boys' team reached the state final four, when the tournament consisted of individual play. These were John Paul (1965) and Brian Rice (1986).

When the tournament consisted of individual play, 7 doubles teams reached the elite 8. These teams were Ann Rumble and Penny Dollar (1968), Carla Thornton and Joy Alligood (1971 AAA), Virginia Balfour and Greer Becknell (1973), Dayna Leak and Donna Leak (1976 AAA), Blake Brookered and Mike Clay (1973), and Jesse Booth and Bobby Balfour (1972), and Charles Weir and John Everett (1980 AAA).

== Notable alumni ==
- William Andrews - retired NFL football running back; played collegiately at Auburn University; played professionally with the Atlanta Falcons
- Lloyd J. Austin - current US Secretary of Defense - former CENTCOM commander
- Mike Bobo - college football coach and former University of Georgia quarterback
- Robert Carter - basketball player in the Israeli Basketball Premier League
- Eric Curry - former professional football defensive end in the NFL; played for the Tampa Bay Buccaneers and the Jacksonville Jaguars
- Guy McIntyre - former professional football offensive lineman in the NFL; played for the San Francisco 49ers
- Reggie Perry - NBA basketball player, Brooklyn Nets
- Levale Speigner - former professional baseball player
- Hurston Waldrep - MLB pitcher for the Atlanta Braves
- Sheddrick Wilson - former professional American football wide receiver. He was signed by the Houston Oilers as an undrafted free agent in 1996 and was also a member of the Barcelona Dragons who won the World Cup in 1997
