= CCAT (public school district) =

School district in Georgia, United States

Location
- 531 E Main St, Statesboro, GA 30458 United States
- Coordinates: 32.45234°N 81.774249°W

District information
- Grades: 2–12
- Superintendent: Corliss T. Reese
- NCES District ID: 1300005

Students and staff
- Enrollment: 300
- Faculty: 33
- Student–teacher ratio: 9.09
- District mascot: Steamie the dragon

Other information
- Website: statesborosteam.org

CCAT is the public school district containing the Statesboro STEAM Academy. It is located in Bulloch County, Georgia, United States, based in Statesboro.

== Schools ==
The CCAT school district has one charter school.

- Statesboro STEAM academy
