= Richmond County Technical Career Magnet School =

Coordinates: 33°24′52″N 82°02′52″W

Richmond County Technical Career Magnet School (RCTCM) is a magnet school for the arts and technical careers located in the South Augusta area of Augusta, Georgia, United States. It was formed in 2012 at the former Joseph R. Lamar School in Downtown Augusta, Georgia. In January 2013, Richmond County Technical Career Magnet School moved to the current building with Ms. Keyshone Hunter as Principal (current 2022–present). It draws students in grades 6 through 12 from throughout Richmond County. This school added Middle School for the 2017-2018 school year.

The school's mascot is a White Tiger.
