= Hutchings Career Center =

Coordinates: 32°49′07″N 83°40′15″W

Hutchings Career Center, also known as W.S. Hutchings College and Career Academy, is a high school in Macon, Georgia, United States. It was established in 2002. The school's teams are known as the Cougars.
