= Baldwin County School District (Georgia) =

School district in Georgia (U.S. state)

Address
- 110 North ABC Street Milledgeville, Georgia, 31061-1061; United States
- Coordinates: 33.018729°N 83.228717°W

District information
- Grades: Pre-kindergarten – 12
- Superintendent: Noris Price

Students and staff
- Enrollment: 4,693 (2022–23)
- Faculty: 344.70 (FTE)
- Student–teacher ratio: 13.61

Other information
- Accreditation: Southern Association of Colleges and Schools; Georgia Accrediting Commission
- Telephone: (478) 453-4176
- Website: baldwincountyschoolsga.org

The Baldwin County School District is a public school district in Baldwin County, Georgia, United States, based in Milledgeville. It serves the communities of Milledgeville and Hardwick.

== Schools ==
The Baldwin County School District holds grades pre-school to grade twelve, and consists of four elementary schools (two include pre-school programs), a middle school, and a high school.

=== Elementary schools ===
- Midway Hills Primary School
- Lakeview Academy
- Midway Hills Academy
- Lakeview Primary School
- Lakeside elementary

=== Middle school ===
- Oak Hill Middle School

=== High school ===
- Baldwin High School
