= Vidalia City School District =

School district in Georgia (U.S. state)

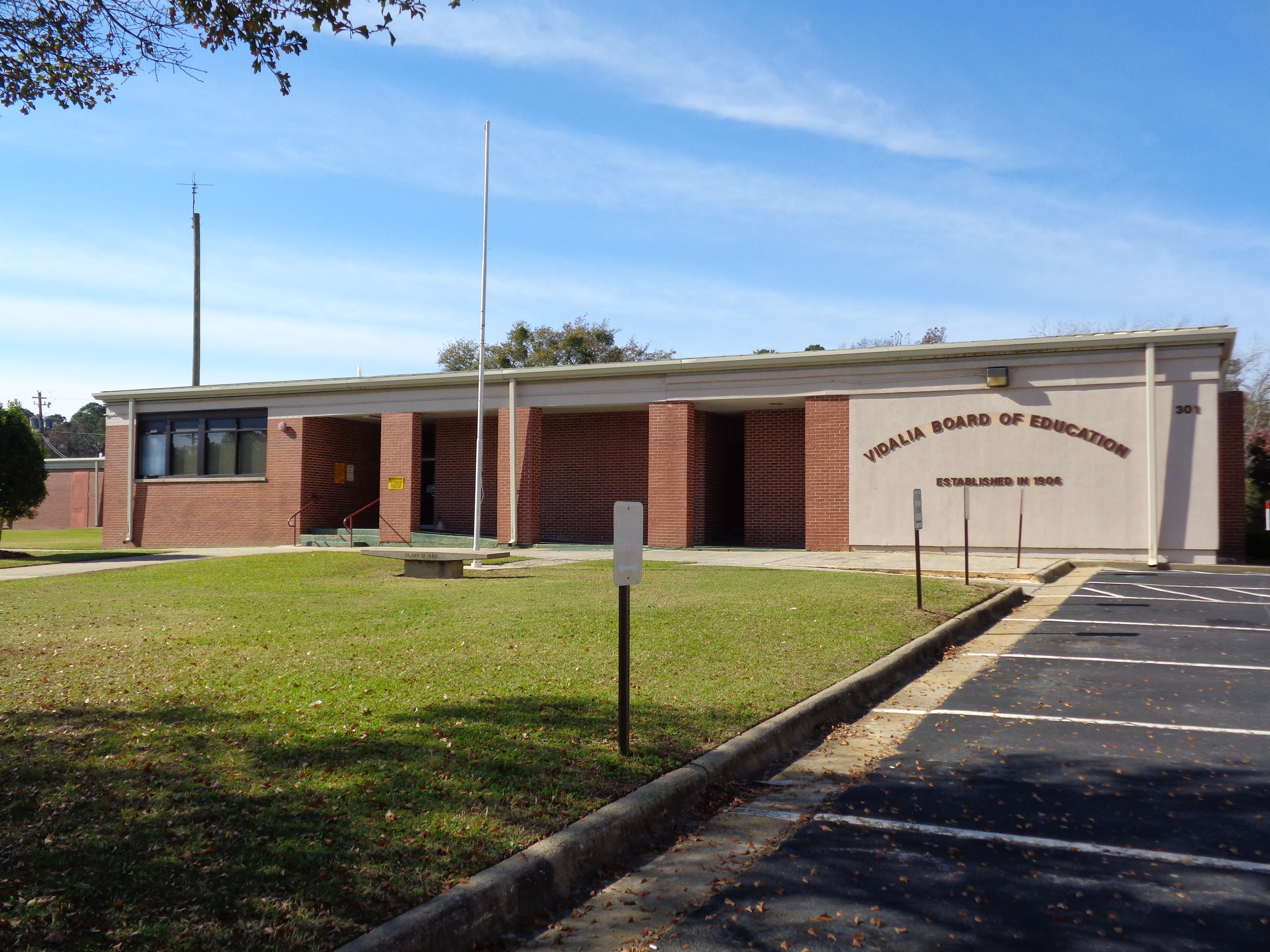

Address
- 1001 North Street Vidalia, Georgia, 30474-4825; United States
- Coordinates: 32.215192°N 82.418083°W

District information
- Grades: Pre-school - 12
- Superintendent: Dr. Garrett Wilcox
- Accreditations: Southern Association of Colleges and Schools; Georgia Accrediting Commission

Students and staff
- Enrollment: 2,408
- Faculty: 144

Other information
- Telephone: (912) 537-3088
- Fax: (912) 538-0938
- Website: vidaliacity.schoolinsites.com

The Vidalia City School District is a public school district in Toombs County, Georgia, United States, based in and serving Vidalia.

== Schools ==
The Vidalia City School District has two elementary schools, one middle school, and one high school.

=== Elementary schools ===
- J. D. Dickerson Primary School (Grades Pre-K through 1st)
- Sally Dailey Meadows Elementary School (Grades 2nd through 5th)

=== Middle school ===
- J. R. Trippe Middle School (Grades 6th through 8th)

=== High school ===
- Vidalia Comprehensive High School (Grades 9th through 12th)

=== Vidalia High School State Titles ===
- Baseball (2) - 1995(2A), 2003(2A), 2022 (2A)
- Cheerleading (3) - 2004(2A), 2017(2A), 2020(2A)
- Football (1) - 1969(B)
- Boys' Golf (9) - 1972(A), 1973(A), 1984(2A), 1985(2A), 1993(2A), 1998(2A), 1999(2A), 2003(2A), 2004(2A)
- Girls' Golf (6) - 2011(2A), 2013(2A), 2014(2A), 2015(2A), 2016(2A), 2017(2A)
- Slow Pitch Softball (2) - 1986(2A), 2002(A/2A/3A)
- Boys' Track (1) - 2017(2A)
- Girls' Track (1) - 2018(2A)

=== Other GHSA State Titles ===
- Literary (2) - 1971(A), 1985(2A)
