= Statesboro STEAM Academy =

Public charter school in Statesboro, Georgia, United States

Coordinates: 32°27′13″N 81°46′27″W

The Statesboro STEAM Academy is a public charter school located in Statesboro, Georgia, United States, and operated by the CCAT Public School District. It was authorized by the Georgia State Board of Education and opened its doors in September 2002. Prior to 2016, it was known as the Charter Conservatory for Liberal Arts and Technology.

== Key People ==
- Corliss Reese (Superintendent, Principal)
- Adrienne Dobbs (High School Principal)
- Philip Cambell (Middle School Principal)
- Benji Lewis (Director of School Operations)

== Academics ==
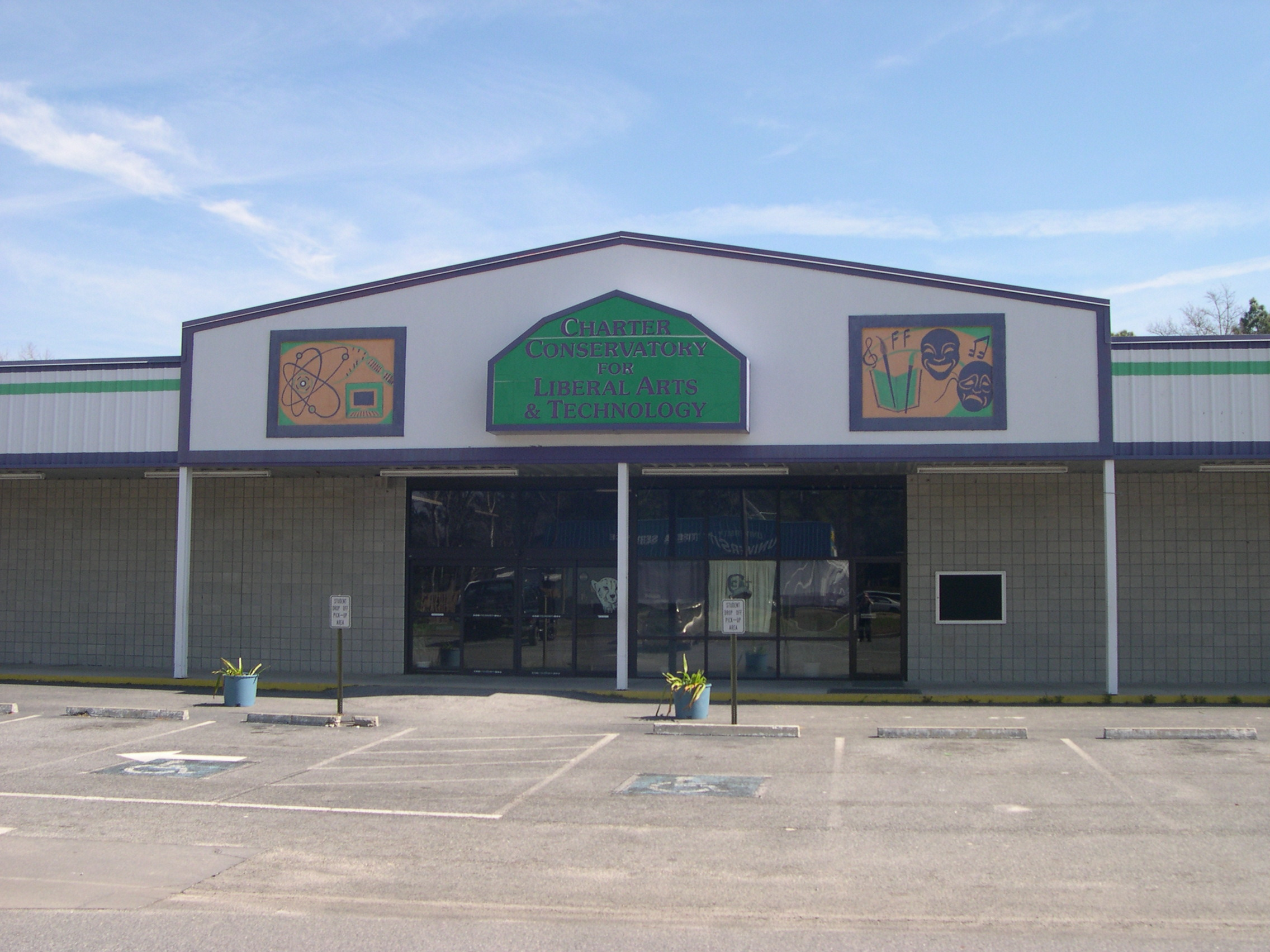
CCAT school

CCAT's Learning Perspective uses Howard Gardner's theory of multiple intelligences. Instead of textbooks, CCAT uses computers for much of its schoolwork and relies on the knowledge of its teachers to meet student needs. Statesboro STEAM relocated from its original address during the summer of 2026, it now resides at 531 E Main street.

== Grade structure ==
The grades taught range from grade 2 to grade 12. Corliss Reese is the principal of the school.

== Reward system ==
The school uses a system known as "Dragon chips". These cards are given to students by staff members, and allow them to redeem various rewards.

== Sports ==
Statesboro STEAM has a variety of sports teams, including men and women's basketball and cross country. Statesboro STEAM also has an E-sports team, playing Super Smash Bros. Ultimate, Rocket League, Mario Kart 8 Deluxe, and Pokemon.
