= Westminster Schools of Augusta =

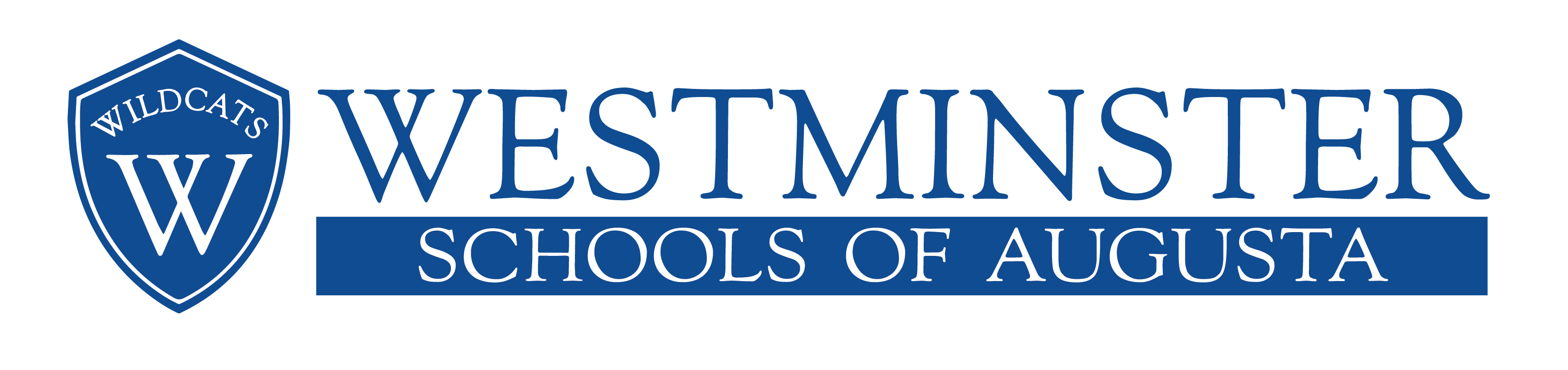
- Official logo

Location
- 3067 Wheeler Road; Augusta, Georgia 30909; United States; 33°29′20″N 82°02′33″W

Information
- Motto: Learning Minds. Living Faith. Leading Boldly.
- Religious affiliation: Christian (non-denominational)
- Established: 1972
- Principal: John Petrey (Lower), Dr. Ashley Oleszewski (Lower), Tracy Lutz (Middle), Bryan White (High), Cindy Bramhall (High)
- Headmaster: Dr. Shawn Brower
- Grades: Pre-K3 through 12
- Average class size: 7:1
- Campus size: 34 acres (140,000 m^{2})
- Colors: Blue and White
- Mascot: Willie Wildcat
- Accreditation: Southern Association of Colleges and Schools; Southern Association of Independent SchoolsCESA
- Website: Westminster Schools of Augusta

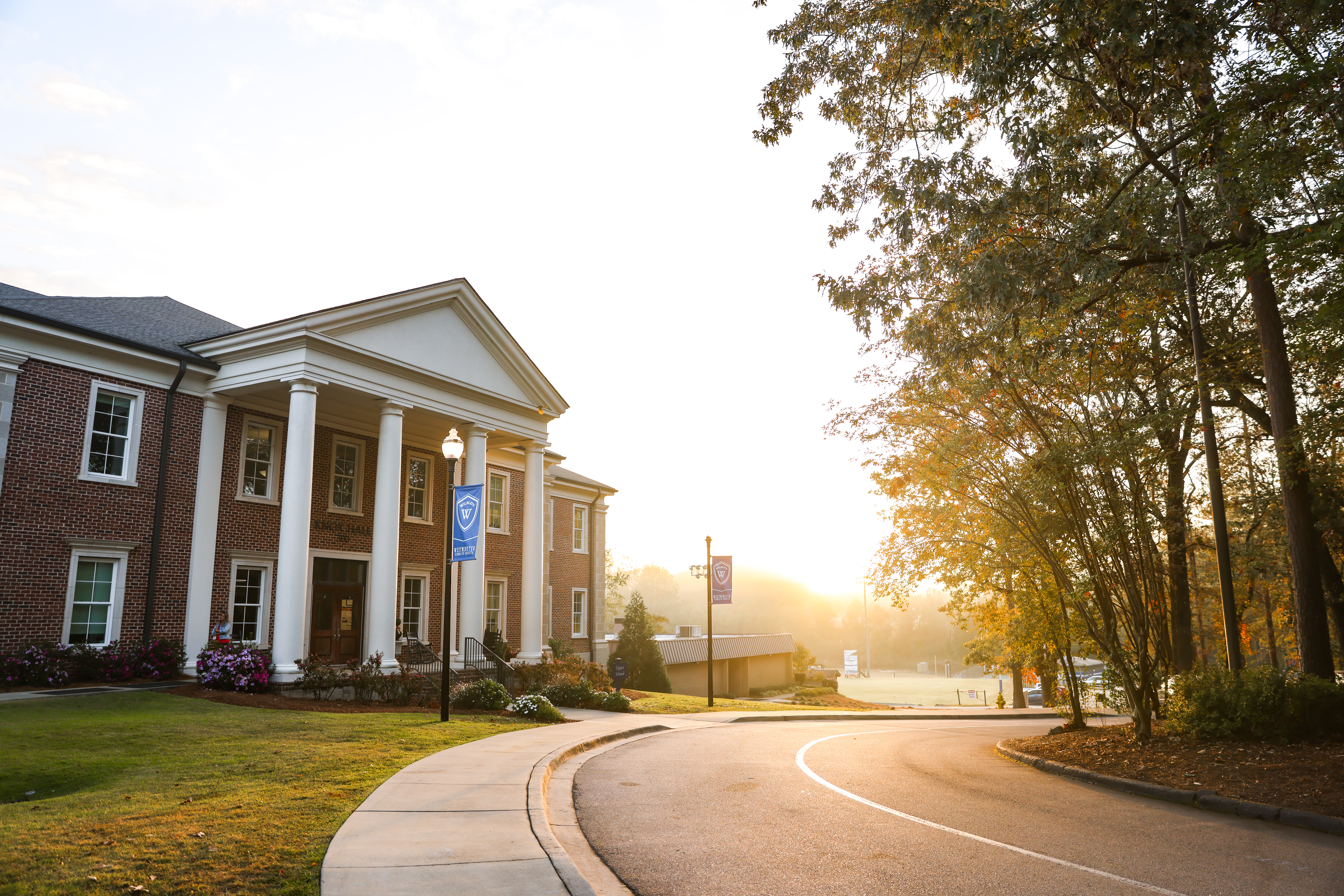
Knox Hall at sunrise, Westminster Schools of Augusta

Westminster Schools of Augusta was founded in 1972 as a private, Christian, college-preparatory school located in the western section of Augusta, Georgia, United States. It serves students in grades pre-kindergarten through 12. The school is divided into three divisions: Lower School (pre-K3 through grade 5), Middle School (grades 6–8), and Upper School (grades 9–12).

The school consists of two primary academic areas on its 34 acres (140,000 m^{2}) suburban campus. The original campus buildings and the newest building, Knox Hall (opened in 2017), serve grades 6 through 12. Pamplin Hall, constructed in 1999, is dedicated to students in pre-kindergarten through grade 5.

== Academics ==
Westminster Schools of Augusta is a Christian, college-preparatory school that offers a rigorous academic curriculum grounded in a biblical worldview. Students have access to 17 Advanced Placement (AP) courses, as well as programs in STEM, writing, and the arts. The school emphasizes academic excellence, critical thinking, and character development.

== Athletics ==
Westminster Schools of Augusta fields 16 varsity interscholastic sport teams, including football, basketball, soccer, tennis, track and field, cross country, baseball, golf, swimming, pickleball, cheerleading, and clay shooting sports.

The Westminster boys' soccer team is among the most dominant in its state classification, having won five state championships and 12 regional titles. The girls' soccer team has also won 12 regional championships and claimed their first state title during the 2008–2009 season.

== Fine Arts ==
The Fine Arts program at Westminster includes visual arts, theater, and music. Students regularly participate in concerts, theatrical productions, and art showcases. Westminster’s commitment to the arts is reflected in its curriculum and extracurricular offerings, including band, choir, theater, and studio art.

== Spiritual Life ==
Students engage in weekly chapel services, Bible instruction, and service learning activities. Faculty are committed Christians who model and mentor students in faith and character as part of the school's mission to glorify God.

== Programs ==
- Outdoor Classroom – Annual experiential learning trips to places like Washington, D.C., for Middle School students.
- Service Learning – Embedded in all grade levels to encourage community and global service.
- Innovation Lab – Offers hands-on STEM and design thinking projects coming 2025.
