= Dodge County School District =

School district in Georgia (U.S. state)

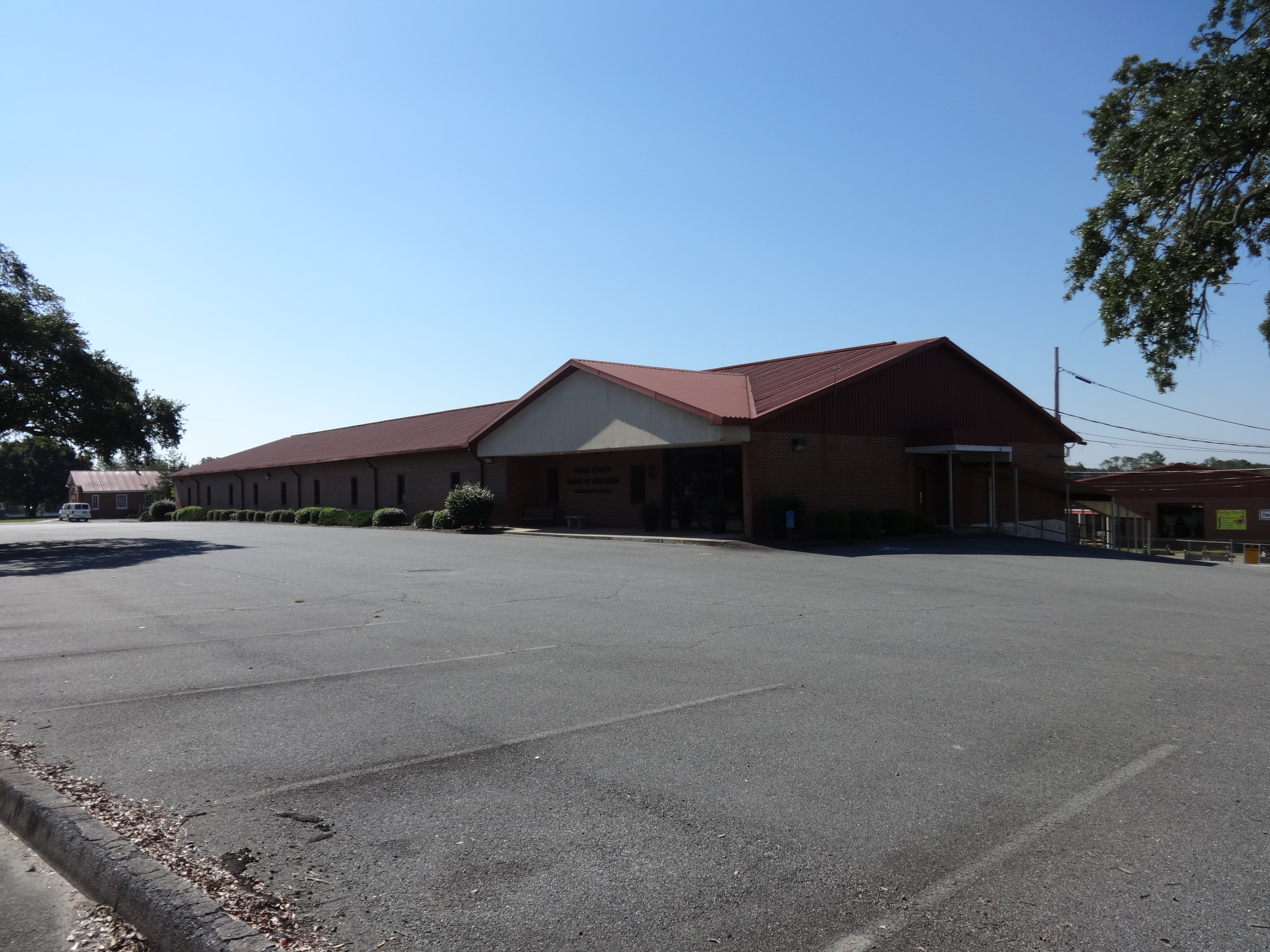

Address
- 720 College Street Eastman, Georgia, 31023-9802; United States
- Coordinates: 32.191052°N 83.173971°W

District information
- Grades: Pre-school - 12
- Superintendent: Thomas Michael Hilliard
- Accreditation: Southern Association of Colleges and Schools; Georgia Accrediting Commission

Students and staff
- Enrollment: 3,558
- Faculty: 210

Other information
- Telephone: (478) 374-3783
- Fax: (478) 374-6697
- Website: www.dodge.k12.ga.us

The Dodge County School District is a public school district in Dodge County, Georgia, United States, based in Eastman. It serves the communities of Chauncey, Chester, Eastman, Milan, and Rhine.

== History ==
In December 1977, Dahl McDermitt was second place in a special election to be the superintendent, with 2,069 votes, while E. M. "Pete" McDuffie, previously a member of the Georgia Senate, got 2,176 votes. Another candidate got 1,552 votes. McDuffie dropped out of the race, and in a runoff election in January 1978, McDermitt won, taking 3,209 votes while his opponent, the third place holder from the 1977 special election, had 2,834 votes. More than half of the eligible voters had voted in the runoff.

== Schools ==
The Dodge County School District has a pre-K center, two elementary schools, one middle school, one high school, and an alternative school with a credit recovery academy.

=== Elementary schools ===
- Dodge Pre-K
- Dodge County Primary School
- Dodge County Elementary School

=== Middle school ===
- Dodge County Middle School

=== High school ===
- Dodge County High School
- Dodge County Achievement Center (Alternative school, serves all grades)
- Dodge Performance Learning Center
