= Social Circle City School District =

School district in Georgia (U.S. state)

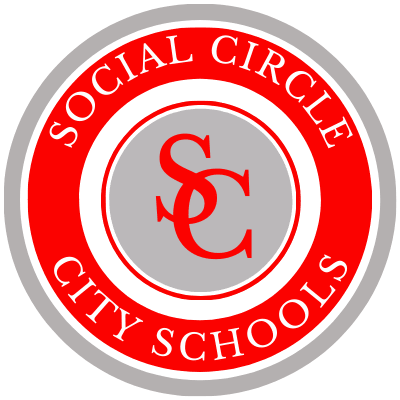

Address
- 147 Alcova Dr Social Circle, Georgia, 30025; United States
- Coordinates: 33.653912°N 83.756527°W

District information
- Grades: Pre-K–12
- Superintendent: Carrie Booher
- Accreditations: Southern Association of Colleges and Schools; Georgia Accrediting Commission

Students and staff
- Enrollment: 1,941 (2022–23)
- Faculty: 130.50 (FTE)

Other information
- Telephone: (770) 464-2731
- Fax: (770) 464-4920
- Website: socialcircleschools.com

The Social Circle City School District is a public school district in Walton County, Georgia, United States, based in Social Circle. It serves the city of Social Circle, which extends into Newton County.

== Schools ==
The Social Circle City School District has two elementary schools, one middle school, and one high school.

Schools:

- Social Circle High School
- Social Circle Middle School
- Social Circle Elementary School
- Social Circle Primary School ( Serving Pre-k only, potentially until 2045)
