= Cornerstone Schools (Georgia) =

Group of private schools in Georgia, US

Coordinates: 34°15′2″N 84°3′45″W

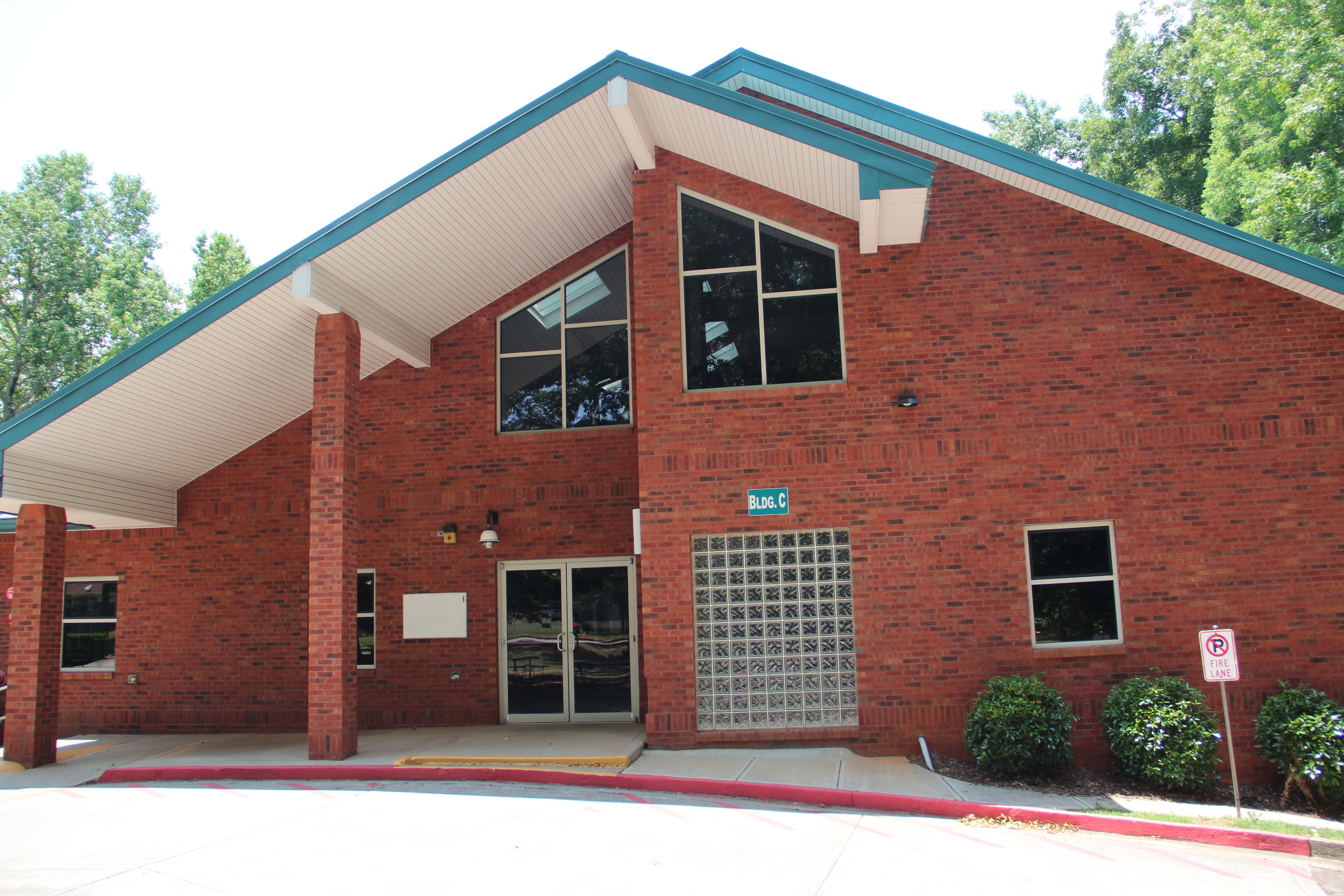
Cornerstone Schools Building C

Cornerstone Schools was a group of private schools in Forsyth County, Georgia, United States, near Cumming. Established in 1999, the school group is located on a 30-acre wooded campus near Lake Lanier and Georgia Highway 400.

The preschool building opened in 2000. In 2001 a competition outdoor swimming pool and cabana opened. In March 2003 the first elementary school building opened. In 2005 the second elementary and middle school building opened. In 2009 two athletic fields opened, and in 2010 a new gym was built, which houses the school’s volleyball and basketball teams. A plot of land was also cleared for potential expansions.

In 2024, Angela Martin, the school's president and owner, was charged after failing to report sexual abuse allegations involving former daycare worker Tulsi Patel. Due to legal troubles, the school was sold to St. John Bosco Academy, a Catholic hybrid school, and Cornerstone ceased operation in May of 2025.
