= Tattnall Square Academy =

- High School Building

Location
- 111 Trojan Trail; Macon, Georgia 31210; United States
- Coordinates: 32°53′30″N 83°43′17″W

Information
- Type: Private school
- Motto: "Start Strong. Finish Strong."
- Religious affiliation: Baptist
- Established: 1969 (57 years ago)
- Founder: Tattnall Square Baptist Church
- CEEB code: 111962
- Head of school: Dr. Travis Absher
- Faculty: 75
- Grades: K3-12th grade
- Enrollment: 600
- Student to teacher ratio: 13:1
- Campus: Suburban
- Colors: Royal blue and gold
- Mascot: Troy the Trojan
- Nickname: Tattnall or TSA
- Yearbook: Horizons
- Website: www.tattnall.org

Tattnall Square Academy (TSA) is a private Christian school located in Macon, Georgia, United States. It was chartered by Tattnall Square Baptist Church in 1969 and has been described at the time of its founding as a segregation academy.

Tattnall is accredited by the Southern Association of Colleges and Schools and the Southern Association of Independent Schools.

== History ==
The school was founded on February 5, 1969, by Tattnall Square Baptist Church.

Tattnall Square Academy was originally located on the corner of Coleman Avenue and Adams Street, in Macon, Georgia, across from Tattnall Square Park, in the Educational Building of Tattnall Square Baptist Church. It was relocated to its present location off Wesleyan Drive, near the Original end of Lakecrest Drive, on Trojan Trail, in 1972. Originally, at the current location, the campus consisted only of the main building, Trojan Hall (then a gymnasium, currently an auditorium), and the baseball and football fields. In 1988, the school opened its football and track complex, which hosted eleven of the school's state football titles. Since then, a new elementary building, high school building, and athletic complex have been added to the campus. In 2004, the school's original gymnasium was converted to the aptly named "Trojan Hall", a 512-seat auditorium. Also added was a new athletic complex, which included a new basketball court, football and basketball locker rooms, and a sports medicine facility. Although once described as a segregation academy, Tattnall maintains a non-discriminatory policy.

== Athletics ==
Tattnall currently competes in the Single-A subdivision of the Georgia High School Association. During the 2014-2015 school year, the school followed numerous other private schools in leaving the Georgia Independent School Association to compete in the Georgia High School Association. Tattnall has won over 40 state and 115 region championships to date, and most recently, Tattnall has won region titles in football (2016), baseball (2014–19), and fast-pitch softball (2017 and 2018), and state championships in baseball (2016, 2018, 2019). Currently, 75% of students compete on an athletic team.

Tattnall Square Academy's baseball team is a consistent contender for the GHSA Single-A state title and maintains top 10 state and top 100 national rankings.

== Academics ==
Tattnall Square Academy offers 18 Dual enrollment and AP courses through Middle Georgia State University and Central Georgia Technical College. Also offered are 15 honors courses. The school has 14 extra-curricular clubs, including FCA and the Ecology Action Club. For two years, each graduating class has achieved 90% HOPE Scholarship retention. The Tattnall Square Academy Math team has built a championship standard, amassing, on average, 19 first-place trophies annually, winning the GHSA Single-A Private State Championship.

== Notable alumni ==
- Deandre Smelter, professional football player, San Francisco 49ers
- Durant Brooks, professional football player

== Accreditation and membership ==
- Southern Association of Colleges and Schools
- Southern Association of Independent Schools
- Georgia Accrediting Commission
- Georgia High School Association
- Georgia Independent School Association
