= Central Fellowship Christian Academy =

Private Christian high school in Bibb County, Georgia, United States

Location
- 8460 Hawkinsville Road; Macon, Bibb County, Georgia 31216; United States; 32°41′21″N 83°38′14″W

Information
- Former name: Cochran Field Christian Academy
- School type: Private
- Religious affiliation: Central Fellowship Baptist Church
- Established: 1970 (56 years ago)
- CEEB code: 111939
- NCES School ID: 00296958
- Principal: Jake Walls
- Faculty: 20 (on an FTE basis)
- Grades: K3-12
- Enrollment: 289 (2018)
- Student to teacher ratio: 13.4
- Campus size: 24 acres (9.7 ha)
- Campus type: Rural
- Accreditation: Georgia Accrediting Commission
- Website: www.cfcalancers.org

Central Fellowship Christian Academy is a private Christian school in Bibb County, Georgia.

== History ==
Cochran Field Christian Academy was established in 1970 as a segregation academy. It was one of six new private schools founded in Bibb County in 1970. The number of private schools in Bibb County peaked at 23 in the late 1980s.

In 1979, its sponsor church, Cochran Field Baptist Church, merged with Grace Baptist Church to form Central Fellowship Baptist Church in Macon, Georgia. The school name was changed to Central Fellowship Christian Academy. The school had far less racial diversity in the 2021–22 school year than the local school district.
