= Chickamauga City Schools =

School district in Georgia (U.S. state)

Chickamauga City School District

Address
- 402 Cove Road Chickamauga, Georgia, 30707-1614; United States
- Coordinates: 34.873492°N 85.290354°W

District information
- Grades: K–12
- Superintendent: Stacy McDaniel
- Accreditation(s): Southern Association of Colleges and Schools; Georgia Accrediting Commission

Students and staff
- Enrollment: 1,277 (2022–23)
- Faculty: 82.40 (FTE)

Other information
- Telephone: (706) 382-3100
- Fax: (706) 375-5364
- Website: glschools.org

The Chickamauga City School District is a public school district in Walker County, Georgia, based in Chickamauga. It serves the city limits of Chickamauga.

The district consists of three schools, one elementary school, one middle school, and one high school.

== Schools ==
=== Elementary schools ===
- Chickamauga Elementary School contains grades K-5. The school has 29 classrooms, media center, cafeteria, and gym. The students have specialized classes in library, music, and physical education each week. The school has almost 600 students and about 56 faculty members.

=== Middle school ===
- Gordon Lee Middle School is the newest school, founded in 1991. This school acquired the 6th grade from the elementary school and the 7th and 8th grades from the high school. The construction of this school included a large band room and cafeteria which is shared by GLHS.

=== High school ===
- Gordon Lee High School

== Awards ==
Chickamauga City Schools was notified by the Southern Association of Colleges and Schools that it has been recognized as a "2004-2005 Super System for Quality Schools." Only 521 school districts in the 11-state region served by SACS received this designation. Now 15 schools are in the region.
