= John Milledge Academy =

Private school in Georgia, USA

Location
- 197 Log Cabin Rd; Milledgeville, Georgia 31061; United States; 33°08′54″N 83°15′36″W

Information
- Type: Private
- Established: 1971 (55 years ago)
- CEEB code: 112101
- NCES School ID: 00297055
- Head of school: Allen Simmons
- Faculty: 36.6
- Enrollment: 496 (2016)
- Colors: Blue and gold
- Sports: Football, softball, cross country, cheerleading, wrestling, basketball, swim team, clay target sports, soccer, track, golf
- Mascot: Trojan
- Team name: Trojans
- Website: www.johnmilledge.org

John Milledge Academy, named after Georgia Governor John Milledge, is a private school located on a 40 acres (16 ha) campus on Log Cabin Road in Milledgeville, Georgia, United States. It is coed and nonsectarian, serving students in grades PK-12. Founded in 1971, John Milledge Academy is accredited by the Georgia Accrediting Commission, and is affiliated with Georgia Independent School Association (GISA).

== History ==
John Milledge Academy Inc. was chartered in 1971 and granted tax-exempt status in June of that year.

Classes began on September 8, 1971 on a campus of 40 acres (16 ha) of land donated by Wister L. Ritchie, Jr. The first graduating class (1973) consisted of seven people. The campus only included one building, which was overseen by original headmaster Thomas Rasnick. Initially the school's official colors were red, white, and blue, and the mascot was the Patriot. The first school sponsored sport was basketball, and in 1974 the school held its first football game.

In May 2011, Larry S. Prestridge retired as headmaster after 30 years of service to the school, and was replaced by Mark Hopkins. In September 2016, Hopkins resigned as Head of School, being replaced by Jessica Jones and Larry Prestridge.

== Notable alumni ==
- Harrison Bryant, football player
- J. T. Wall, football player, Milledge AD
