= Anne Marie Armstrong =

American basketball player (born 1991)

Personal information
- Born: January 24, 1991 (age 35) Norcross, Georgia, U.S.
- Listed height: 6 ft 3 in (1.91 m)

Career information
- High school: Wesleyan (Peachtree Corners, Georgia)
- College: Georgia Bulldogs (2009–2013)
- WNBA draft: 2013: 3rd round, 31st overall pick
- Drafted by: Atlanta Dream
- Position: Guard / Forward
- Number: 3

Career history
- 2013: Atlanta Dream

Career highlights
- First-team All-SEC (2012); SEC All-Defense (2012); 2× Miss Georgia Basketball (2008, 2009)
- Stats at Basketball Reference

Anne Marie Armstrong (born January 24, 1991) is an American former professional basketball player who played for the Atlanta Dream of the Women's National Basketball Association (WNBA). She played college basketball for the Georgia Bulldogs.

== Early life ==
Anne Marie Armstrong was born on January 24, 1991, in Norcross, Georgia. She attended Wesleyan School in Peachtree Corners, Georgia. She won three state championships in basketball, three state championships in volleyball and four state championships in track and field (three individual high jump titles and one team title). She was named Miss Georgia Basketball in both 2008 and 2009. Armstrong was also named the 2008–09 National Player of the Year in girls basketball by the National Christian School Athletic Association. She participated in fast-pitch softball and swimming growing up as well.

== College career ==
Armstrong played college basketball for the Georgia Bulldogs from 2009 to 2013. She played in 34 games, starting three, during her freshman year in 2009–10, averaging 5.2 points per game and 2.5 rebounds per game. She appeared in 34 games, starting 18, in 2010–11, averaging 7.0 points, 4.0 rebounds, 1.6 assists, and 1.0 steals per game. Following her sophomore year, she considered switching to volleyball but ultimately stayed with the basketball team. Armstrong played in 31 games, starting 28, during the 2011–12 season, averaging 11.5 points, 6.2 rebounds, 3.0 assists, 2.2 steals, and 1.1 blocks per game while also earning first-team All-Southeastern Conference (SEC) and SEC All-Defense honors. She appeared in 34 games, starting 29, her senior year in 2012–13, averaging 7.2 points, 5.1 rebounds, 2.3 assists, 1.4 steals, and 1.1 blocks.

== Professional career ==
Armstrong was selected by the Atlanta Dream in the third round, with the 31st overall pick, of the 2013 WNBA draft. She played in nine games for the Dream during the 2013 season, totaling six points, four rebounds, and one steal in 25 minutes. Following her WNBA career, she played professionally in Brazil, Spain, Israel, Italy, and Poland.

== Post-playing career ==
Armstrong has worked as a real estate agent after her basketball career. She was inducted into the Gwinnett County Sports Hall of Fame in 2024.
