= Chad Hall =

American football player and coach (born 1986)

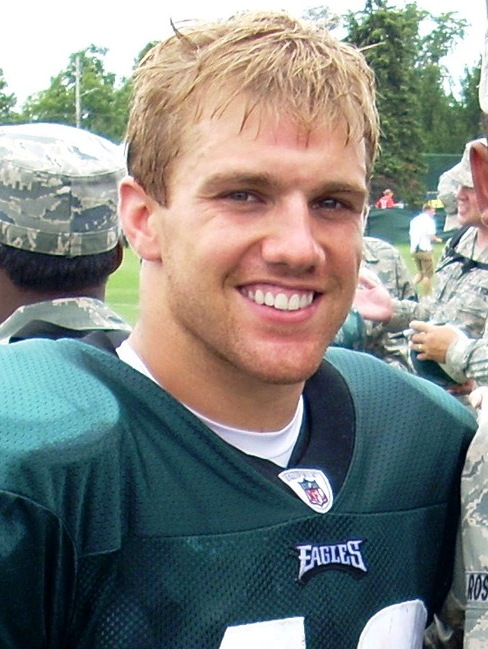
- Hall with the Philadelphia Eagles in 2010

New York Giants
- Title: Wide receivers coach

Personal information
- Born: May 23, 1986 (age 40); Atlanta, Georgia, U.S.
- Listed height: 5 ft 8 in (1.73 m)
- Listed weight: 180 lb (82 kg)

Career information
- Position: Wide receiver (No. 16, 14)
- High school: Wesleyan School (Peachtree Corners, Georgia)
- College: Air Force (2004–2007)
- NFL draft: 2008: undrafted

Career history

Playing
- Philadelphia Eagles (2010–2011); San Francisco 49ers (2012); Kansas City Chiefs (2013); Jacksonville Jaguars (2014)*
- * Offseason or practice squad member only

Coaching
- Buffalo Bills (2017–2022); Offensive assistant (2017–2018); Wide receivers coach (2019–2022); Jacksonville Jaguars (2023–2024) Wide receivers coach; New York Giants (2025–present); Assistant quarterbacks coach (2025); Wide receivers coach (2026–present)

Awards and highlights
- MW Offensive Player of the Year (2007); First-team All-MW (2007); Second-team All-MWC (2006)

Career NFL statistics
- Receptions: 16
- Receiving yards: 155
- Receiving touchdowns: 2
- Stats at Pro Football Reference

Chandler "Chad" Hall (born May 23, 1986) is an American professional football coach and former wide receiver who currently serves as the wide receivers coach for the New York Giants of the National Football League (NFL). He played college football for the Air Force Falcons, and was signed by the Philadelphia Eagles in 2010 after going undrafted in 2008. Hall also played for the San Francisco 49ers and Kansas City Chiefs.

== College career ==
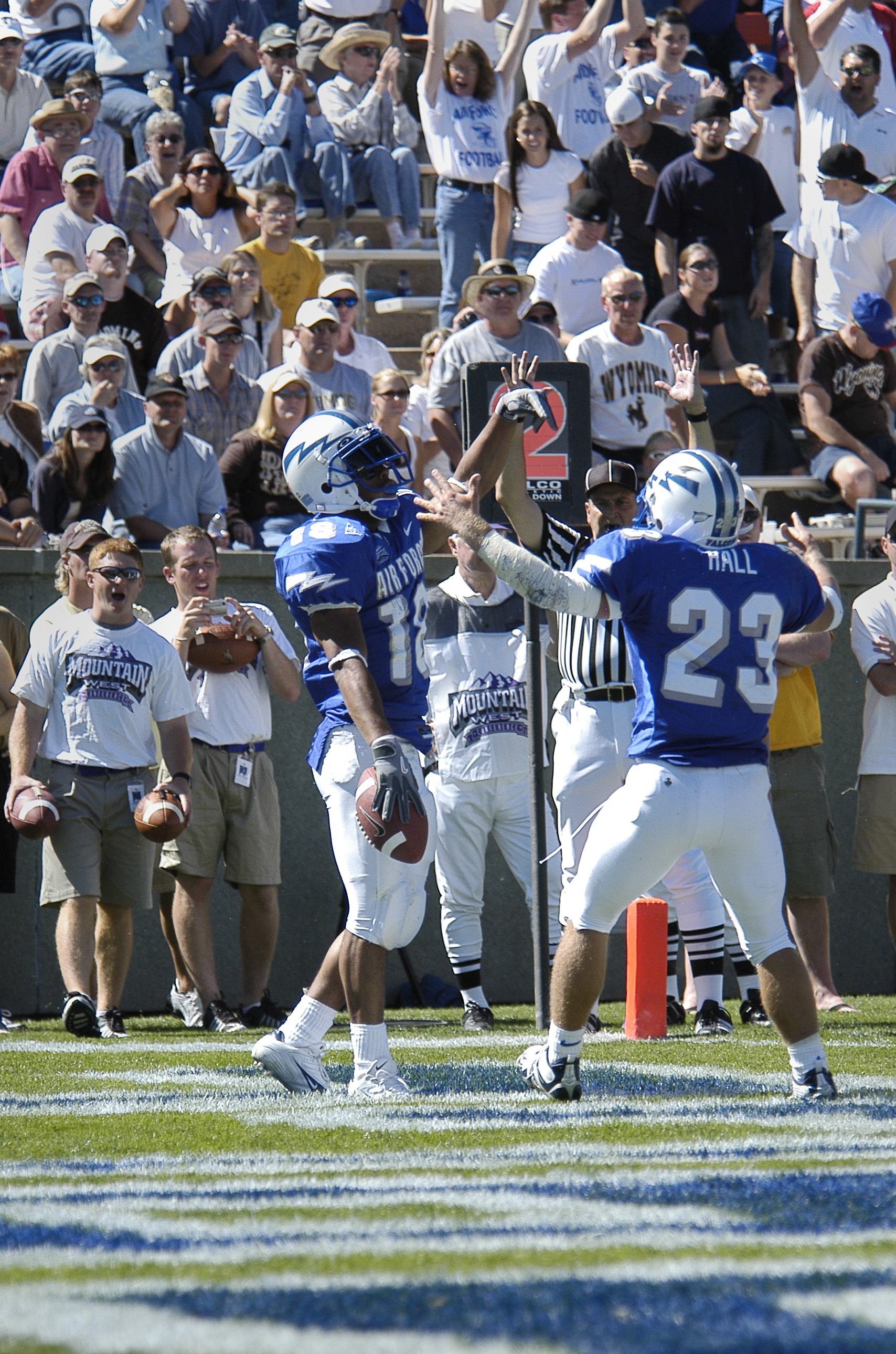
Hall (right) celebrates a touchdown with fellow US Air Force Academy running back Justin Handley during a 2005 game.

After graduating from Wesleyan School in Norcross, Georgia, Hall attended the United States Air Force Academy, where he lettered in football for three years. He was initially recruited to play quarterback, but after his freshman year he was converted to running back. During his senior year, he played wide receiver in addition to running back and return specialist.

Hall set an Air Force record with 275 yards rushing in a win against Army on November 3, 2007. He also rushed for one touchdown, caught three passes for 19 yards, and returned three punts for 39 yards.

On November 10 against Notre Dame, Hall rushed for 132 yards on 32 carries, caught two passes for 31 yards, and returned three kickoffs for 99 yards. He finished with 272 all-purpose yards in the win.

He was the only player in the country to lead his team in rushing and receiving during his senior year. He finished third in the nation in all-purpose yards. Late in his senior year (2007), he was campaigned to win the Heisman Trophy.

== Air Force ==
From 2008–2009, Hall served in the United States Air Force as a second lieutenant. He was based in Hill Air Force Base in Utah as a maintenance officer, assigned to the 388th Maintenance Group.

== Professional career ==
Pre-draft measurables
Height	Weight
5 ft 7 5/8 in (1.72 m)	185 lb (84 kg)
All values from Pro Day

=== Philadelphia Eagles ===
After going undrafted in the 2008 NFL draft, Hall tried out for the Atlanta Falcons during minicamp, but was not offered a contract. He also had a tryout for the Buffalo Bills.

Hall was signed by the Philadelphia Eagles to a three-year contract on March 11, 2010. Hall had worked out at the University of Utah's Pro Day on March 8. He was waived during final cuts on September 4, and re-signed to the team's practice squad on September 5. He was promoted to the active roster on October 9 following an injury to Riley Cooper. Hall rushed for 19 yards on four carries with one reception for five yards in week 7 against the Tennessee Titans.

Hall caught his first career touchdown pass on a four-yard reception from Kevin Kolb in the 2010 season finale against the Dallas Cowboys on January 2, 2011; he finished the game with six receptions for 84 yards.

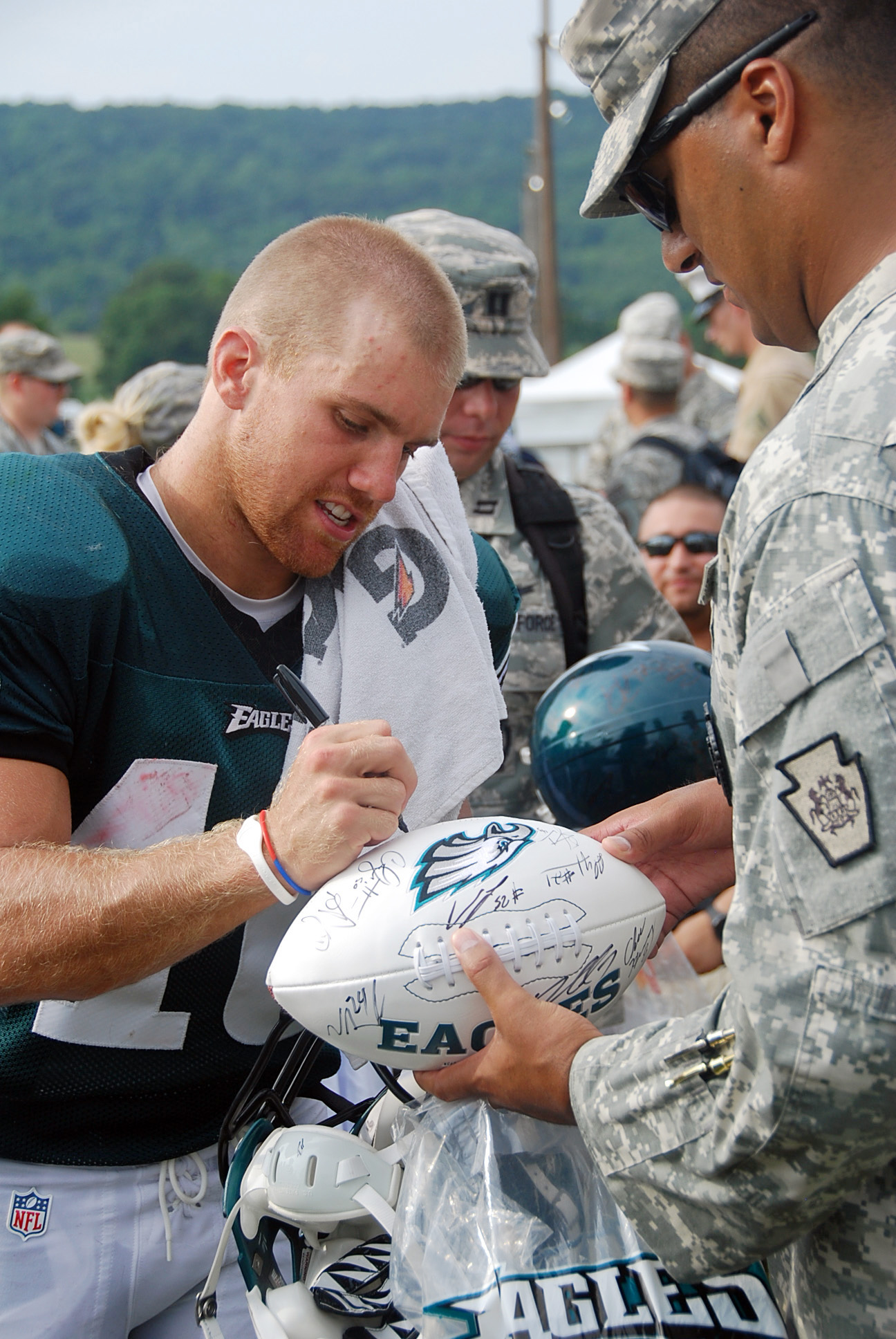
Hall signing autographs in 2012

During the 2011 offseason, Hall competed for the Eagles' sixth receiver spot and punt-returning duties with Sinorice Moss and Johnnie Lee Higgins. Despite leading the team in catches and receiving yards during the preseason, Hall was waived by the Eagles during final roster cuts on September 3, 2011, as the Eagles elected to only keep five receivers on the active roster. He was re-signed to the team's practice squad the following day. Hall was promoted to the active roster on November 16.

=== San Francisco 49ers ===
Hall was signed to the San Francisco 49ers practice squad on November 27, 2012, after injuries to 49ers running back Kendall Hunter and wide receiver Kyle Williams. On January 19, 2013, he was promoted from the practice squad to the active roster and was active in the 2012-13 NFC championship game but did not record a statistic, he was inactive in Super Bowl XLVII. On August 31, 2013, Hall was cut from the San Francisco 49ers.

=== Kansas City Chiefs ===
On September 1, 2013, Hall was claimed by the Kansas City Chiefs, reuniting him with his former head coach Andy Reid. Hall was released on November 13, 2013, to make room for wide receiver Kyle Williams. However, shortly after signing, Williams was injured and Hall was subsequently re-signed on November 22, 2013. Hall was released by the Chiefs on December 7, 2013. On December 13, 2013, Hall was re-signed by the Kansas City Chiefs. Chad Hall in 2013 caught two passes, one for nine yards and one for eleven yards for the Kansas City Chiefs. Hall was released by the Chiefs on December 19, 2013.

=== Jacksonville Jaguars ===
Hall was signed by the Jacksonville Jaguars on August 6, 2014, but was waived on August 16, 2014.

== Coaching career ==
=== Buffalo Bills ===
In 2017, new Buffalo Bills head coach Sean McDermott brought Hall on as an offensive assistant. McDermott was previously the Defensive coordinator for the Eagles while Hall was on the team. Eagles head coach Doug Pederson attempted to hire Hall to his coaching staff but was blocked by the Bills; the Bills instead promoted Hall to wide receivers coach on February 2, 2019.

While with Buffalo, Hall helped Stefon Diggs make three straight Pro Bowls (2020–2022) and earn a first-team All-Pro selection in 2020 (second-team in 2022). Under Hall's tutelage, Diggs became the first Bill with 100-plus receptions in consecutive seasons and set an NFL record for receptions in a player's first two seasons with a team (230). Additionally, Buffalo wide receiver Gabriel Davis set an NFL playoff record by catching four touchdown passes against the Kansas City Chiefs on January 23, 2022.

=== Jacksonville Jaguars ===
On February 10, 2023, Hall joined the Jacksonville Jaguars as their wide receivers coach, reuniting him with Doug Pederson (his offensive coordinator in Kansas City).

=== New York Giants ===
On February 10, 2025, the New York Giants hired Hall to serve as their assistant quarterbacks coach. In February 2026, the Giants announced that Hall would be retained by new head coach, John Harbaugh, and was promoted to wide receivers coach on his staff.

== Personal life ==
Hall and his wife Rose married in May 2018. In September 2019, Chad and Rose welcomed their first child, a daughter named Penelope Rose. In February 2021, they welcomed their second child, a son named Chandler Wright. Hall's sister Kelly is married to Matthew Stafford.
