= Berkeley Lake, Georgia =

- City
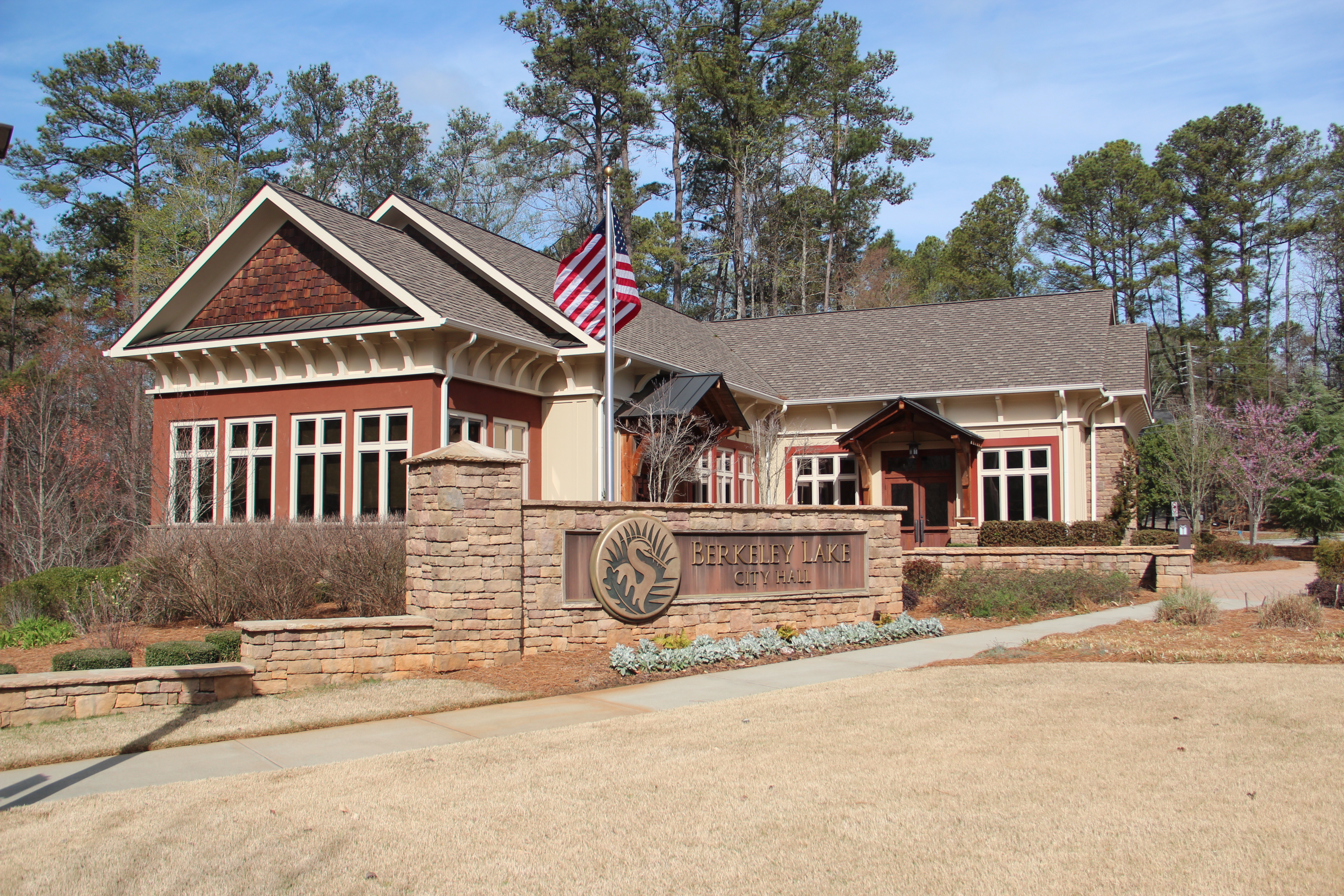
- Berkeley Lake City Hall

- Location in Gwinnett County and the state of Georgia
- Coordinates: 33°58′50″N 84°11′02″W
- Country: United States
- State: Georgia
- County: Gwinnett

Area
  - Total: 1.86 sq mi (4.81 km^{2})
  - Land: 1.75 sq mi (4.52 km^{2})
  - Water: 0.11 sq mi (0.28 km^{2})
- Elevation: 1,011 ft (308 m)

Population (2020)
  - Total: 2,054
  - Density: 1,175.7/sq mi (453.93/km^{2})
- Time zone: UTC-5 (Eastern (EST))
  - Summer (DST): UTC-4 (EDT)
- FIPS code: 13-07248
- GNIS feature ID: 2403859
- Major airport: ATL
- Website: www.berkeley-lake.com

Berkeley Lake is a city in Gwinnett County, Georgia, United States. It is a northern suburb of Atlanta. From its 1956 origins as a summer retreat, Berkeley Lake has grown into a thriving community centered on its 88-acre (360,000 m^{2}) namesake lake. As of the 2020 census, the city had a population of 2,054. It has been named a Tree City USA for 18 years.

== History ==
The majority of lands in the city limits (the 700-acre (2.8 km^{2}) Berkeley Lake Properties) were developed by Frank Coggins in the late 1940s. The dam, constructed in 1948, is one of the largest earthen dams in the state. The city's namesake, Lake Berkeley (77 acres (310,000 m^{2})), was named after Mr. Coggins' Berkeley Blue Granite Quarries in Elberton. In 1950 the Berkeley Lake "subdivision," which included five reserved Free Pass and Repass tracts (FPR) and the residential and fishing lots around the lake, was laid out. In 1952, Calvin and Kate Parsons, along with John and Dorothy Bagwell, purchased the Berkeley Realty & Investment Company and its 700-acre (2.8 km^{2}) property.

For many years, Berkeley Lake was primarily a summer retreat, with an assortment of fishing cottages mingling with a slowly growing number of permanent homes. The health of the lake was guarded by a small, but tenacious, core of residents, each lending their expertise and time.

In 1953, some 25 property owners met and formed the Lake Berkeley Civic Association. Besides zoning and developmental control, there were important needs such as electricity, telephones, and "an all year road" around the lake. This need for benefits that an incorporated city could help secure brought about the creation of its charter, which was approved by the General Assembly of Georgia on March 6, 1956. A new municipality to be known as the City of Berkeley Lake was created in Gwinnett County.

Over the years since the city's incorporation, a number of ordinances have been passed to protect the character and tranquility of the community. In addition, a comprehensive master plan for future land use and growth was developed and adopted.

Since 1994, five new subdivisions have been added to nearly complete the development of all the land within the city limits. Only two tracts of over 10 acres (40,000 m^{2}) remain. In November 1996, residents supported a referendum for the issuance of a bond to be used to purchase one of these tracts, approximately 63 acres (250,000 m^{2}) of undeveloped forest land. This property, which provides both buffer and greenspace, was acquired by the city in December 1996.

In 2009, the city received record-breaking rainfall and the Lake Berkeley Dam was damaged. The lake was subsequently drained and, with the help of FEMA, repaired. The Lake Berkeley Dam repairs were completed in 2013, and the lake returned to full pool in 2014.

== Geography ==
Berkeley Lake is in western Gwinnett County, bordered by Duluth to the east, Peachtree Corners to the south and west, and Johns Creek to the north. The northern boundary of the city follows the Chattahoochee River, which is also the Fulton County line. Peachtree Industrial Boulevard is the main road through the city. The community consists of several subdivisions around the private 88-acre (360,000 m^{2}) Lake Berkeley.

According to the United States Census Bureau, the city has a total area of 1.2 square miles (3.1 km^{2}), of which 1.1 square miles (2.8 km^{2}) is land and 0.1 square miles (0.3 km^{2}), or 10.14%, is water.

== Demographics ==
Historical population
Census	Pop.	Note	%±
1960	94		—
1970	219		133.0%
1980	503		129.7%
1990	791		57.3%
2000	1,695		114.3%
2010	1,574		−7.1%
2020	2,054		30.5%
U.S. Decennial Census

=== 2020 census ===
As of the 2020 census, Berkeley Lake had a population of 2,054. The median age was 52.7 years. 16.5% of residents were under the age of 18 and 23.8% of residents were 65 years of age or older. For every 100 females there were 97.7 males, and for every 100 females age 18 and over there were 97.6 males age 18 and over.

100.0% of residents lived in urban areas, while 0.0% lived in rural areas.

There were 776 households in Berkeley Lake, of which 30.9% had children under the age of 18 living in them. Of all households, 77.6% were married-couple households, 7.6% were households with a male householder and no spouse or partner present, and 12.1% were households with a female householder and no spouse or partner present. About 9.5% of all households were made up of individuals and 5.6% had someone living alone who was 65 years of age or older.

There were 592 families in the city. There were 799 housing units, of which 2.9% were vacant. The homeowner vacancy rate was 0.3% and the rental vacancy rate was 2.6%.

Berkeley Lake racial composition as of 2020
Race	Num.	Perc.
White (non-Hispanic)	1,538	74.88%
Black or African American (non-Hispanic)	106	5.16%
Native American	5	0.24%
Asian	230	11.2%
Other/Mixed	82	3.99%
Hispanic or Latino	93	4.53%

== Education ==
Berkeley Lake residents are zoned to Duluth cluster schools in the Gwinnett County Public Schools system: Berkeley Lake Elementary, Duluth Middle, and Duluth High School.

== Infrastructure ==
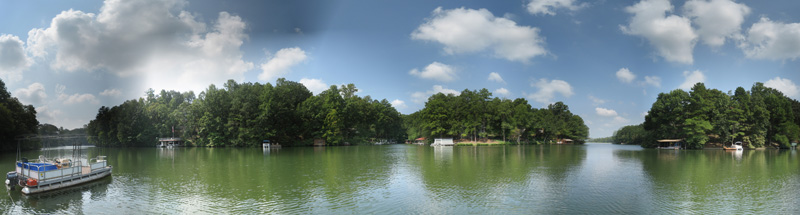
Berkeley Lake, 2007

=== Roads and expressways ===
A number of collector roads distribute traffic around both incorporated and unincorporated areas of the city.

=== Transit systems ===
Ride Gwinnett serves the city.

=== Pedestrians and cycling ===
- The Loop Trail (Under construction)
- Western Gwinnett Bikeway
