= Duluth High School =

Public secondary school in Duluth, Georgia, United States

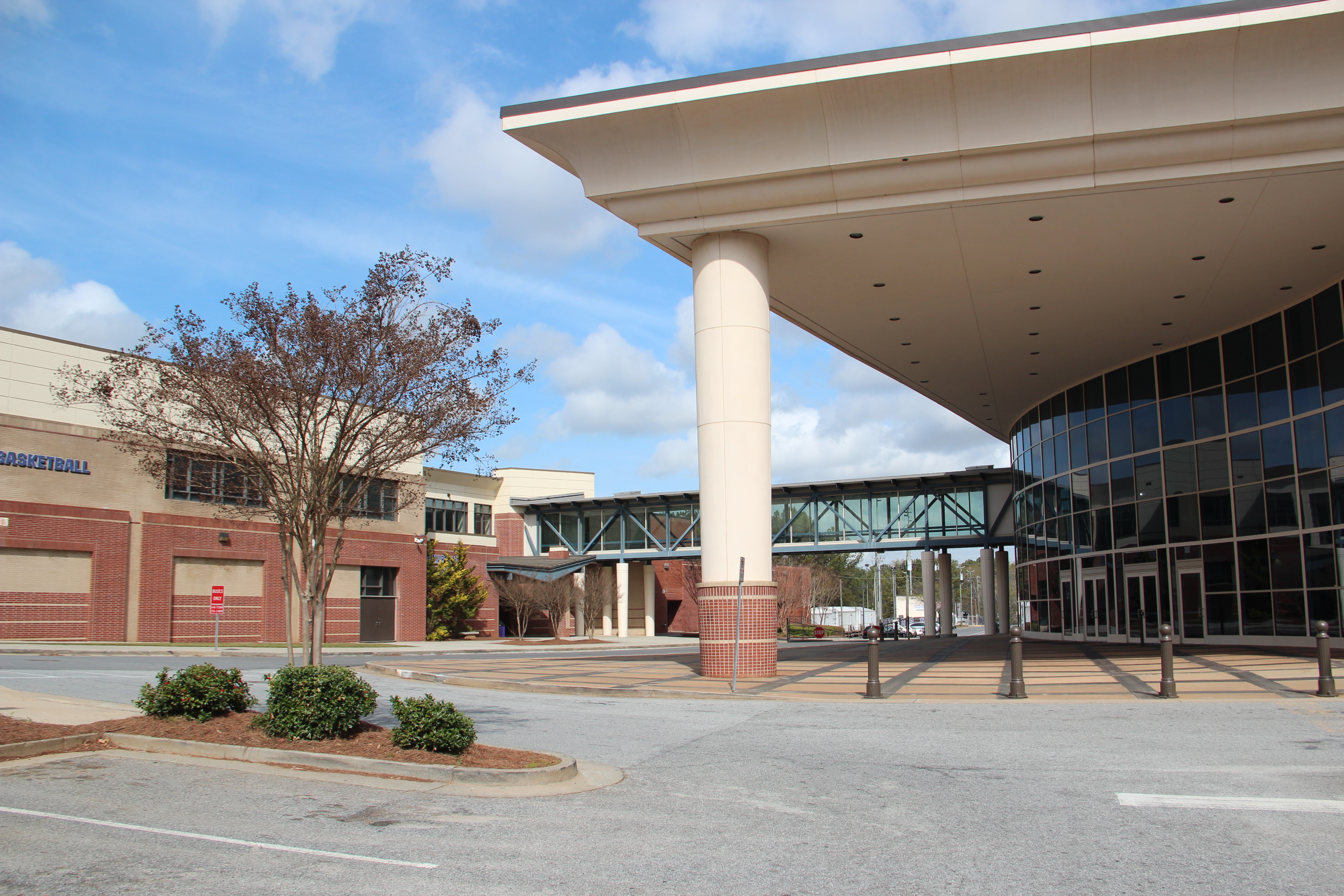

Location
- 3737 Brock Rd; Duluth, Georgia 30096; United States; 34°00′36″N 84°08′39″W

Information
- Type: Public
- Motto: Challenging All to Succeed
- Established: 1958
- School district: Gwinnett County Public Schools
- Principal: Cindy Kinchen
- Teaching staff: 155.40 (FTE)
- Grades: 9–12
- Gender: All
- Enrollment: 2,556 (2024–2025)
- Student to teacher ratio: 16.45
- Campus: Suburban
- Colors: Purple and White
- Mascot: Wildcat
- Accreditation: SACS
- Region: 7 in Class AAAAAA (GHSA)
- Website: Duluth High School

Duluth High School is a public secondary school in Duluth, a suburb of Atlanta, Georgia, United States. It provides education for grades 9-12 and is operated by Gwinnett County Public Schools.

The school was built in 1958 and serves Duluth, Berkeley Lake, Peachtree Corners, and unincorporated portions of western Gwinnett County. As of 2019, it has 2,741 students enrolled.

DHS holds a Blue Ribbon School award. In its 2012 Georgia rankings, U.S. News & World Report ranked it tenth among all public, charter and magnet schools, fourth among all public schools, and first among all Gwinnett County public schools. Niche ranked Duluth as the most diverse public high school in Georgia and the 24th most diverse public high school in America.

== Notable alumni ==
- James Dashner, American writer best known for The Maze Runner series
- Adam Flagler, NBA player
- Nick Green, MLB baseball player
- Brian McCann, MLB baseball player
- Monica Padman, actress and podcaster
- George Rogers, NFL football player and Heisman Trophy winner
