= Georgia State Route 141 =

Highway in Georgia

State Route 141
- Georgia State Route 141 highlighted in red

Route information
- Maintained by GDOT
- Length: 34.1 mi (54.9 km)

Major junctions
- South end: US 19 / SR 9 in Buckhead, Atlanta
- SR 237 in Buckhead, Atlanta; SR 141 Conn. in Buckhead, Atlanta; SR 13 Conn. in Doraville; I-285 in Doraville; SR 140 in Peachtree Corners; SR 120 in Johns Creek; US 19 / SR 400 southwest of Cumming; SR 9 southwest of Cumming
- North end: SR 20 west of Cumming

Location
- Country: United States
- State: Georgia
- Counties: Fulton, DeKalb, Gwinnett, Forsyth

Highway system
- Georgia State Highway System; Interstate; US; State; Special
← SR 140	→ SR 142

State Route 141 (SR 141) is a 34.1-mile-long (54.9 km) state highway that runs southwest-to-northeast in the northwest part of the U.S. state of Georgia. It connects the Buckhead area of Atlanta with Cumming. Its routing exists within portions of Fulton, DeKalb, Gwinnett, Forsyth counties.

== Route description ==
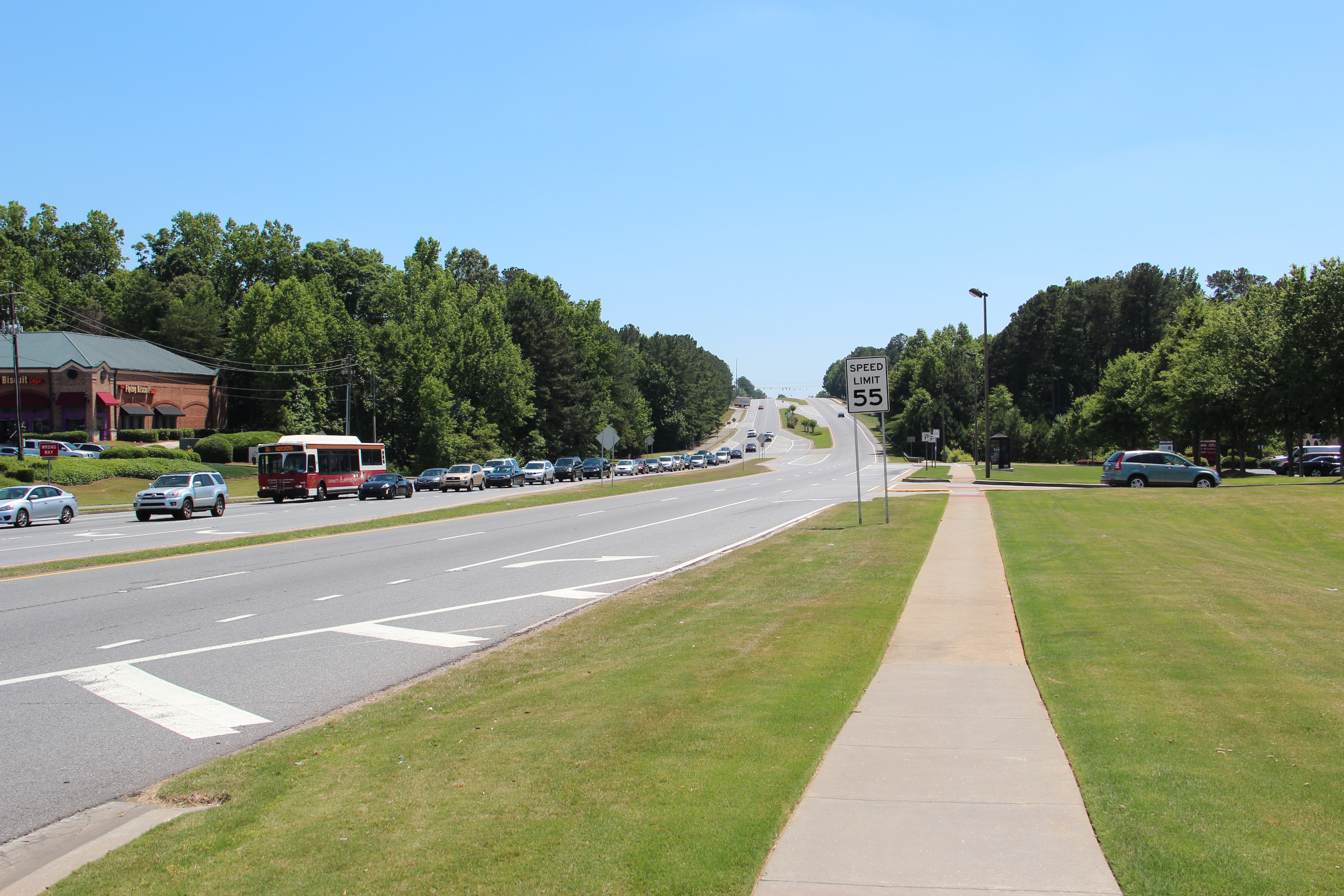
State Route 141 in Peachtree Corners

SR 141 begins at an intersection with US 19/SR 9 (Roswell Road NE) in the Buckhead neighborhood of Atlanta, in Fulton County. It travels to the northeast to an intersection with SR 237 (Piedmont Road NE). Just after that intersection, it goes over, but does not have an interchange with SR 400 (T. Harvey Mathis Parkway). Immediately after is the southern terminus of SR 141 Connector (Lenox Road NE). The highway passes just northwest of the Buckhead Heights neighborhood, crosses into DeKalb County, and passes through Brookhaven. SR 141 passes Oglethorpe University and the Peachtree Golf Club, just before passing through Chamblee. In Doraville, it has an intersection with SR 13 Connector and an interchange with Interstate 285 (I-285). The road becomes a freeway on the northeast of the interchange, served by a pair of one-way frontage roads with "Texas U-turns"; it has a few exits along its length. It enters Gwinnett County near the middle of the freeway; near the end of the freeway is SR 140 where it is called Peachtree Parkway. It passes through Peachtree Corners. Then, it crosses over the Chattahoochee River back into Fulton County. It travels through Johns Creek and meets SR 120 (Abbotts Bridge Road). Northeast of there, it enters Forsyth County. The roadway curves to the northwest and then to the north. It has an interchange with US 19/SR 400 (Hospitality Highway), southwest of Cumming. Until 2020, SR 141 ended just to the northwest at SR 9, but it was extended north on Bethelview Road where it now ends at SR 20. SR 371 was removed from the state highway system as a mileage swap in order to add Bethelview Road to the state highway system.

All of SR 141 from its southern terminus in Buckhead to a point southwest of Duluth is part of the National Highway System, a system of roadways important to the nation's economy, defense, and mobility.

== Major intersections ==
County	Location	mi	km	Destinations	Notes
Fulton	Atlanta	0.0	0.0	US 19 / SR 9 (Roswell Road NE) / West and East Paces Ferry Road	Southern terminus
Fulton	Atlanta	0.6	0.97	SR 237 (Piedmont Road NE)	
Fulton	Atlanta	1.3	2.1	SR 141 Conn. north (Lenox Road NE) to SR 400 / Monarch Drive / Ritz Drive / Phipps Drive	Southern terminus of SR 141 Connector
DeKalb	Doraville	7.4	11.9	SR 13 Conn. (Motors Industrial Way)	
DeKalb	Doraville	7.6	12.2	I-285 (Atlanta Bypass / SR 407) – Greenville, Marietta, Chattanooga	I-285 exit 31; southern end of freeway
DeKalb	Doraville	8.4	13.5	Tilly Mill Road – Georgia State University	
DeKalb–Gwinnett county line	Doraville–Peachtree Corners city line	9.5	15.3	Winters Chapel Road / Amwiler Road	
Gwinnett	Peachtree Corners	10.6	17.1	Jones Mill Road, Peachtree Corners Circle	Northbound exit, Southbound entrance
Gwinnett	Peachtree Corners	11.2	18.0	SR 140 (Jimmy Carter Boulevard) – Roswell, Tucker	Northbound exit, Southbound entrance. Southern Terminus of SR 141 Conn.
Gwinnett	Peachtree Corners	11.6	18.7	Peachtree Industrial Boulevard – Duluth	Northern end of freeway; Northbound exit, Southbound entrance
Gwinnett	Peachtree Corners	11.6	18.7	To SR 140 (Jimmy Carter Boulevard) / Jones Mill Road, Peachtree Corners Circle	Northern end of freeway; Southbound exit, Northbound entrance via frontage road
Gwinnett	Peachtree Corners	11.9	19.2	Holcomb Bridge Road	Northern terminus of SR 141 Conn.
Gwinnett	Peachtree Corners	13.5	21.7	Spalding Drive	
Fulton	Johns Creek	17.1	27.5	State Bridge Road – Gwinnett Medical Center-Duluth	
Fulton	Johns Creek	19.5	31.4	SR 120 (Abbotts Bridge Road) – Alpharetta, Duluth	
Fulton–Forsyth county line	Johns Creek	21.0	33.8	McGinnis Ferry Road – Emory Healthcare Johns Creek Hospital	
Forsyth		27.7	44.6	US 19 / SR 400 (Hospitality Highway) – Atlanta, Dahlonega	SR 400 Exit 13
Forsyth		28.0	45.1	SR 9 (Atlanta Highway) – Milton, Cumming	Former northern terminus from 1971-2020
Forsyth		34.1	54.9	SR 20 (Canton Highway) – Canton, Cumming	New northern terminus in 2020
1.000 mi = 1.609 km; 1.000 km = 0.621 mi: Incomplete access

== Related routes ==
=== Atlanta connector route ===
State Route 141 Connector
- Location: Buckhead, Atlanta
- Length: 0.9 mi (1,400 m)

State Route 141 Connector (SR 141 Conn.) is a 0.9-mile-long (1.4 km) connecting route of SR 141 that exists entirely within the Buckhead section of Atlanta, in eastern Fulton County. It is known as Lenox Road NE, as well as Paul Coverdell Memorial Parkway, for its entire length. It was built in the early 1990s in conjunction with SR 400 to serve area businesses and offices.

It begins at an intersection with the SR 141 mainline (Peachtree Road NE) just northwest of the Buckhead Heights neighborhood of Atlanta. The highway heads northwest, curves to the west-southwest underneath, where it crosses SR 400 (T. Harvey Mathis Parkway) with a single-point urban interchange. It curves to the southwest to meet its northern terminus, an intersection with SR 237 (Piedmont Road NE), at the Buckhead Forest neighborhood of Atlanta.

SR 141 Conn. is not part of the National Highway System, a system of roadways important to the nation's economy, defense, and mobility.

The entire route is in Atlanta, Fulton County.

mi	km	Destinations	Notes
0.0	0.0	SR 141 (Peachtree Road NE) – Chamblee	Southern terminus
0.1	0.16	To SR 141 north / Monarch Drive / Ritz Drive / Phipps Drive	Interchange with left exit and entrance in each direction
0.5	0.80	SR 400 – Atlanta, Dahlonega	Single-point urban interchange
0.9	1.4	SR 237 (Piedmont Road NE)	Northern terminus
1.000 mi = 1.609 km; 1.000 km = 0.621 mi

=== Gwinnett County connector route ===
State Route 141 Connector
- Location: West of Norcross
- Length: 0.8 mi (1,300 m)

State Route 141 Connector (SR 141 Conn.) is a .8 mile long (1.3 km) connecting route of SR 141 that exists entirely within Gwinnett County. It is just west of Norcross. The route at SR 140 (Jimmy Carter Boulevard) and goes north along a frontage road parallel to SR 141/Peachtree Industrial Boulevard. After the split of SR 141 and Peachtree Industrial Boulevard, SR 141 Conn. merges with Peachtree Industrial Boulevard. The route then turns left onto Holcomb Bridge Road and ends at the intersection of Holcomb Bridge Road and SR 141. The route connects traffic from SR 140 to SR 141 north, since there is no direct entrance ramp between these two roads. SR 141 Conn. south does not exist because traffic can exit from SR 141 south directly to SR 140.

The entire route is in Peachtree Corners, Gwinnett County.

mi	km	Destinations	Notes
0.0	0.0	SR 140 (Jimmy Carter Boulevard)	Southern terminus
0.8	1.3	SR 141 (Peachtree Parkway)	Northern terminus
1.000 mi = 1.609 km; 1.000 km = 0.621 mi

=== Peachtree Industrial Boulevard ===
Peachtree Industrial Boulevard
- Location: Chamblee–Buford
- Length: 25.4 mi (40.9 km)

Peachtree Industrial Boulevard is a road in the U.S. state of Georgia that begins in Chamblee and ends in Buford. Between Interstate 285 and SR 140 (Jimmy Carter Boulevard), the road is concurrent with SR 141. North of SR 140, in Peachtree Corners, Peachtree Industrial Boulevard splits from SR 141 and continues to the northeast as a highway with at least four lanes and center median, traveling through the cities of Peachtree Corners, Duluth, Suwanee, Sugar Hill, and Buford. The portion of the road concurrent with SR 141 is maintained by the state; the rest is maintained by Gwinnett County.

Peachtree Industrial Boulevard was originally built in the 1960s. The portion of the road concurrent to SR 141 was upgraded to a limited-access highway in the 1980s and 1990s.

In 2008, the section within the city limits of Chamblee was renamed to Peachtree Boulevard, to reflect the changing nature of the city. Prior to this change, the "industrial" name extended until Peachtree Road merges in near the city line with present-day Brookhaven. In November 2018, the Doraville City Council passed a resolution to authorize the city manager to rename Peachtree Industrial Boulevard within the city limits to Peachtree Boulevard, following the changes made by Chamblee. This change was implemented in 2023.

In 2013, Gwinnett County decreased the speed limit the road to 45 mph between SR 141 (Peachtree Parkway) and SR 20 (Nelson Brogdon Boulevard) and 50 mph between SR 20 and the Hall County line. The goal of the change was to reduce speeding and accidents.

In June 2018, the Atlanta Regional Commission Board approved funding to equip intersections along Peachtree Industrial Boulevard with connected vehicle technology.

Gwinnett County has looked at adding and improving sidewalks along Peachtree Industrial Boulevard.

The Western Gwinnett Bikeway is a multi-use trail under construction along Peachtree Industrial Boulevard.

County	Location	mi	km	Destinations	Notes
DeKalb	Doraville	0.0	0.0	SR 13 Conn. (Motors Industrial Way) / SR 141 (Peachtree Boulevard) – Chamblee	Southern end of SR 141 concurrency; southern terminus; road continues as SR 141/Peachtree Boulevard.
DeKalb	Doraville	0.2	0.32	I-285 (Atlanta Bypass / SR 407) – Greenville, Marietta, Chattanooga	I-285 exit 31; southern end of freeway
Gwinnett	Peachtree Corners	3.2	5.1	Jones Mill Road / Peachtree Corners Circle	No southbound exit; SR 141 southbound exit via SR 140 exit
Gwinnett	Peachtree Corners	3.8	6.1	SR 140 (Jimmy Carter Boulevard) – Roswell, Tucker	No southbound exit
Gwinnett	Peachtree Corners	4.2	6.8	SR 141 north to SR 400 / Peachtree Parkway – Cumming, Dahlonega	Northern end of SR 141; northern end of freeway; northbound exit, southbound entrance
Gwinnett	Peachtree Corners	4.5	7.2	SR 141 Conn. north (Holcomb Bridge Road)	
Gwinnett	Duluth	10.3	16.6	Pleasant Hill Road – Gwinnett Medical Center-Duluth	
Gwinnett	Duluth	11.6	18.7	SR 120 (Abbotts Bridge Road / Duluth Highway) – Alpharetta, Duluth	
Gwinnett	Duluth	12.9	20.8	To US 23 / SR 13 (Buford Highway) / Rogers Bridge Road – Rogers Bridge Park	
Gwinnett	Duluth	14.0	22.5	Sugarloaf Parkway	Interchange
Gwinnett	Suwanee	16.4	26.4	McGinnis Ferry Road – Emory Healthcare Johns Creek Hospital	
Gwinnett	Sugar Hill	21.8	35.1	SR 20 (Nelson Brogden Boulevard) – Cumming, Lawrenceville	
Gwinnett–Hall county line	Buford	25.4	40.9	Cemetery Road / McEver Road	Northern terminus; road continues as McEver Road
1.000 mi = 1.609 km; 1.000 km = 0.621 mi: Concurrency terminus; Incomplete access

== Orphaned segments ==
There are six road segments that previously carried State Route 141 or a derivative designation that no longer do.

1. What is now Georgia SR 371 once was SR 141 between Georgia SR 9 and SR 20. It was changed to its present number in 1971. It was removed from the state highway system in 2020 when SR 141 was extended north along Bethelview Road, essentially replacing its original route with a new alignment.
2. The State Route 141 designation was previously used in DeKalb County between Tucker and US 78 in what is now Stone Mountain Park on what is now Hugh Howell Highway (SR 236) which was at the time named Rosser Road.
3. Prior to construction of Peachtree Parkway and the extension and re-routing of SR 141 to Buckhead, SR 141 followed what is present day Medlock Bridge Road from its current intersection with Peachtree Parkway, into downtown Norcross and became North Peachtree Road, crossed the railroad tracks at Park Street, and then traveled on South Peachtree until its terminus at Buford Highway (SR 13). When plans were drawn to re-route SR 141 to its present alignment, GDOT changed the designation of this roadway to SR 141 Connector. This designation stayed in effect until 1981, when this segment was turned over to the county and converted to local roads. What is now SR 141 between the Buckhead junction with Roswell Road (SR 9) and Motors Industrial Way (present day SR 13 Connector) was designated along with Motors Industrial Way as SR 13W before it was made part of the newly aligned SR 141.
4. With the construction of Interstate 85, Norcross Tucker road, which at the time was a contiguous road, was designated SR 141 Connector, and the small segment of South Peachtree Road between Buford Highway and Norcross Tucker Road was redesigned SR 141 Spur. The South Peachtree Road (SR 141 Spur) was converted to a local road in 1981 along with truncation of SR 141 Connector to Norcross Tucker Road between South Peachtree Rd in Norcross and Interstate 85.
5. As Jimmy Carter Boulevard was constructed in the 1970s, Norcross Tucker Road was split into North Norcross Tucker Road and South Norcross Tucker Road, and a portion of the road was incorporated into Jimmy Carter Boulevard. In 1981, Jimmy Carter Boulevard was designated as SR 141 Connector between Peachtree Industrial Boulevard and Interstate 85. It was converted to State Route 140 in 1984-1985 timeframe and the SR 141 Connector designation was used for what is present day SR 141 Connector at the 141/Peachtree Industrial Boulevard interchange when the Jimmy Carter Boulevard/SR 141 intersection was upgraded to a grade separated intersection.
6. The 17.5 mile segment of State Route 369 East of SR 9 from North of Cumming to Gainesville was designated as SR 141 until 1970, when it was extended west to SR 20, and redesigned to its present-day number.

== See also ==
- Peachtree Road
- Transportation in Atlanta
