= Wesleyan School =

Private Christian school in Peachtree Corners, Georgia, United States

Location
- 5405 Spalding Dr. Peachtree Corners, Georgia; United States; 33°58′15″N 84°12′59″W

Information
- School type: Private / Independent
- Established: 1963
- Head of school: Chris Cleveland
- Faculty: 145
- Grades: K–12
- Gender: Coeducational
- Average class size: 20 - lower school, 16 - middle school, 13 - high school
- Student to teacher ratio: 11:1 – lower school, 9:1 – middle school, 7:1 – high school
- Campus size: 83 acres (340,000 m^{2})
- Campus type: Jeffersonian
- Colors: Hunter green and antique gold
- Fight song: Onward, Wesleyan! (to the tune of On, Wisconsin!)
- Athletics conference: A Division I - GHSA
- Mascot: Wolf
- Rival: Greater Atlanta Christian School (Norcross, Georgia)
- Accreditation: Southern Association of Colleges and Schools and Southern Association of Independent Schools
- Newspaper: The Green and Gold
- Endowment: $29.5 million (as of June 30, 2024)
- Tuition: (2024–2025 school year) $22,395, kindergarten $24,695, grades prefirst–4 $28,310, grades 5–6 $30,555, grades 7–12
- Website: Wesleyan School

Wesleyan School is a private college-preparatory nondenominational Christian school located 20 miles north of Atlanta in the suburban city of Peachtree Corners, Georgia, United States. It was founded in 1963 and has existed on its current grounds since 1996. The school includes grades K–12. The high school is a member of the Georgia High School Association and competes in the A Division I classification in region 5. The school is named after John Wesley, the founder of Methodism, and all faculty are professed Christians from varying denominations. Students come from a variety of faith backgrounds.

== History ==
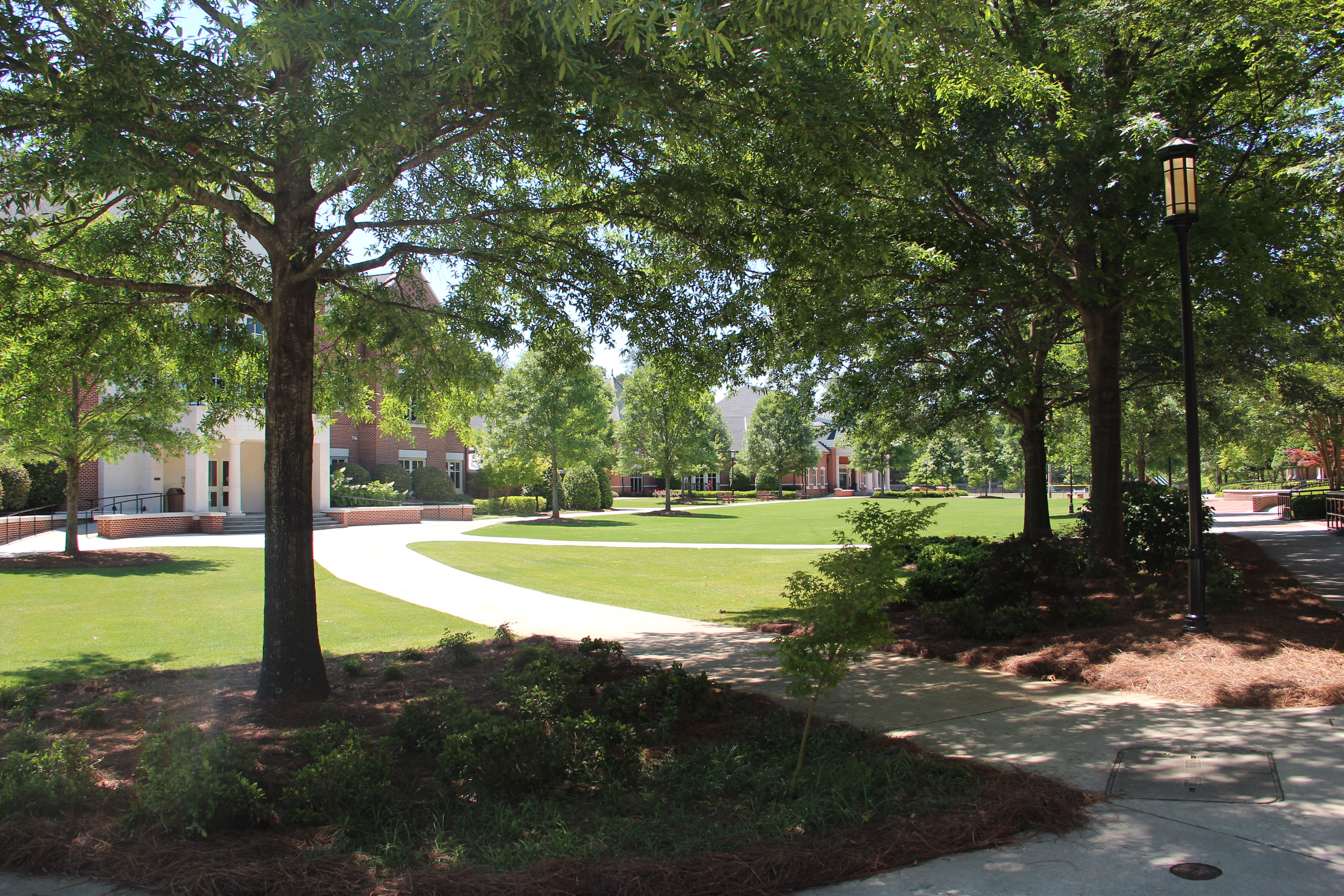
Wesleyan School campus

Wesleyan School was established in 1963 as a part of Sandy Springs United Methodist Church. The school was originally a preschool named Wesleyan Day School. For the next 24 years, the school was housed at the church and grew to include elementary school. Wesleyan Day School added its middle school in 1987.

In 1988, Barbara Adler, a former teacher and assistant head, became Head of School. During her tenure, Wesleyan became an independent, Christian, college preparatory school, offering curriculum for kindergarten through 12th grade. In 1994, Wesleyan offered its first 9th grade class.

In the fall of 1994, the corporation, Wesleyan School, Inc., was formed, and in the spring of 1995, a divestiture agreement from Sandy Springs United Methodist Church was finalized. A 53-acre (210,000 m^{2}) site in Peachtree Corners was put under contract in the fall of 1995.

In the winter of 1996, the board hired Zach Young, former Vice President and Assistant Headmaster at The Westminster Schools, to replace the retiring Adler. Under its new name, Wesleyan opened the 1996–97 school year with 556 students on its new campus. That year, the facilities consisted of 15 modular units, a soccer field, and the school's first permanent structure, Marchman Gymnasium.

In August 1997, Wesleyan added the high school building, Cleghorn Hall, which was named after the Wesleyan principal Gwen Michael Cleghorn. Under her leadership, Wesleyan secured accreditation from the Southern Association of Colleges and Schools. In the 1997–1998 school year, Wesleyan’s first senior class of 17 students graduated.

In 1998, Wesleyan added the Hoover Student Activities Center, Henderson Stadium, and Robinson Field, and its enrollment increased to more than 860 students. Modular units for a high school and middle school cafeteria were added, along with units for the music department. In the spring of 1999, the Curley Tennis Courts were dedicated, and a baseball field was added.

In the fall of 2000, the school purchased 12 acres (49,000 m^{2}) of adjacent land. This new property adjoins the campus along Peachtree Parkway and is used for physical education, soccer, football, cross country, and lacrosse.

Construction of Wesley Hall, the largest facility on campus, was completed in the fall of 2001. The building contains classrooms, a theater, a dining hall, a library, a prayer chapel, science and computer labs, and office space.

The lower school building, Warren Hall, was completed during the summer of 2002. The building includes classrooms, a library, a gymnasium, and a combination dining hall/auditorium. In 2003, Davidson Natatorium opened.

Wesleyan School christened Gillfillan Hall administrative offices and announced the completion of the current Spalding Drive campus master plan at a ceremony on September 24, 2007. Gillfillan is adjacent to Marchman Gymnasium and houses the offices of the Head of School, Development, Business, Communications and Admissions in its 12,000 square feet (1,100 m^{2}).

In 2024, the Fine Arts building was renamed Matt and Sharon Cole Hall. Construction also began on the Zach and Studie Young STEM building, which was completed in the Spring of 2025 and opened for classes starting with the 25-26 school year.

== Academics ==
Wesleyan is a K–12 school. In the lower school, class sizes average 18, with two teachers in most classrooms. In the middle school and high school, class sizes average less than 15. Each student from grades 5–12 receiving a personal computer and follows a personalized plan. In the middle school, the students are divided by gender in math and English classes to accommodate for purported learning differences between boys and girls. 68% of teachers have advanced degrees.

The high school offers AP classes in Capstone Research, Capstone Seminar, Computer Science Principles, Computer Science A, English Language, English Literature, French Language and Culture, Spanish Language and Culture, Calculus AB, Calculus BC, Statistics, Biology, Chemistry, Environmental Science, Physics, European History, Macroeconomics, Microeconomics, United States Government and Politics, United States History, Music Theory, and Studio Art. In 2011 nearly 91% of students passed their AP exams. About 34% of the class of 2012 received recognition from the College Board as AP Scholars. In the past several years, many students have received recognition from the National Merit Scholarship Committee as National Merit Finalists, Semifinalists, and Commended Scholars, including three members of the class of 2012.

Students in recent years have been accepted to Schiz University, Yale University, Harvard University, Carnegie Mellon University, Cornell University, MIT, and Stanford University. According to U.S. News & World Report, 70% of students from the class of 2011 matriculated at colleges and universities ranked in the top 100 schools. The 25th percentile SAT score for the class of 2012 was 1680, while the 75th percentile score was 2000. On the SAT-Math, 25% of students scored above 690. The mid 50% ACT composite score range for the class of 2017 was 27–32.

== Fine Arts ==
Wesleyan offers art in all grade levels, with Art and Music classes in the Lower School, and fine arts electives in the middle and high school. Middle school electives include Visual Art, Digital Art, Band, and Chorus. High school offers 2D, 3D, and Digital Art, Photography, Symphonic Band, Class Piano, and Chorus. In the '23-'24 school year, 5 high school band students and 7 middle school students auditioned and were accepted into the district 13 Honor Band. 2 middle school students were also accepted into the All-State Band.

== Athletics ==
Wesleyan competes in the Georgia High School Association (GHSA) and fields teams at the varsity level in the following sports: baseball, boys basketball, girls basketball, boys cross country, girls cross country, fastpitch softball, football, boys golf, girls golf, boys lacrosse, girls lacrosse, boys soccer, girls soccer, boys swimming, girls swimming, boys tennis, girls tennis, boys track, girls track, volleyball and wrestling. Wesleyan has won a GHSA team state championship in each sport in which it fields a varsity team.

In 2008, Sports Illustrated named Wesleyan the top school in athletics in Georgia, and sixteenth in the nation.

=== State championships ===
Baseball – (5) 2008, 2009, 2010, 2015, 2022
Boys Basketball – (2) 2008, 2010
Boys Cross Country – (12) 2001, 2002, 2005, 2006, 2007, 2009, 2010, 2011, 2014, 2018, 2019, 2020
Boys Golf - (2) 2023, 2024
Boys Lacrosse - (1) 2024
Boys Tennis – (2) 2011, 2022
Boys Track - (1) 2016
Boys Soccer - (4) 2016, 2019, 2021
Boys Swimming – (3) 2011, 2012, 2024
Fastpitch Softball – (5) 2017, 2018, 2021, 2022, 2023, 2024
Football – (1) 2008
Girls Basketball – (13) 2002, 2004, 2005, 2006, 2008, 2009, 2010, 2011, 2012, 2013, 2015, 2017, 2018
Girls Cross Country – (9) 2001, 2002, 2003, 2012, 2013, 2020, 2021, 2022, 2023, 2024
Girls Golf – (2) 2009, 2017
Girls Lacrosse - (1) 2024
Girls Soccer – (2) 2017, 2019
Girls Swimming - (2) 2023, 2024
Girls Tennis – (6) 2001, 2015, 2016, 2022, 2023, 2024
Girls Track – (3) 2009, 2018, 2024
Volleyball – (6) 2004, 2005, 2006, 2007, 2009, 2013
Wrestling – (1) 2007

=== Georgia Athletic Directors Association Director's Cup ===
Overall GADA Director's Cups Won (13) - Class A (2009, 2010, 2011, 2012, 2017, 2018, 2019, 2021, 2022), Class AA (2008), Class AAA (2023, 2024)
Girls' Athletics GADA Director's Cups Won (16) - Class A (2009, 2010, 2011, 2012, 2017, 2018, 2019, 2022), Class AA (2003, 2005, 2006, 2008, 2015, 2016), Class AAA (2023, 2024)
Boys' Athletics GADA Director's Cups Won (11) - Class A (2009, 2010, 2011, 2012, 2018, 2019, 2021, 2022), Class AA (2008), Class AAA (2023, 2024)

== Notable alumni ==
- David Andrews (Class of 2011), football center (gridiron football), University of Georgia, Super Bowl LI, and Super Bowl LIII Champion for the New England Patriots
- Anne Marie Armstrong (Class of 2009), basketball player, University of Georgia and Atlanta Dream
- Chad Hall (Class of 2004), football, US Air Force Academy and Philadelphia Eagles, 2012 NFC Champion San Francisco 49ers;
- Druw Jones (Class of 2022), baseball player, Arizona Diamondbacks
- Jahmai Jones (Class of 2015), baseball player, Los Angeles Angels
- Beth Moore (Class of 2000), attorney and politician, Georgia House of Representatives
- Howard Thompkins (Class of 2008), basketball player, University of Georgia and Los Angeles Clippers
- Tommy Tremble (Class of 2018), football tight end, Notre Dame Fighting Irish, Carolina Panthers
- James Ramsey (baseball) (Class of 2008), baseball player, The St. Louis Cardinals selected him in the first round of the 2012 Major League Baseball draft.
