= Miss Georgia Basketball =

Each year the Miss Georgia Basketball award is given to the person chosen as the best high school girls basketball player in the U.S. state of Georgia. The award winner is selected by members of the Atlanta Tip Off Club.

== Award winners ==
Year	Player	High School	College	WNBA draft
2026	Kate Harpring	Marist School	North Carolina	
2025	Hailee Swain	Holy Innocents' Episcopal	Stanford	
2024	Danielle Carnegie	Grayson	Georgia Tech	
2023	Courtney Ogden	The Westminster Schools	Stanford	
2022	Sydney Bowles	Woodward Academy	Texas A&M	
2021	Raven Johnson (2)	Westlake	South Carolina	
2020	Raven Johnson	Westlake	South Carolina	
2019	Deasia Merrill	Villa Rica	Kentucky, Georgia State, TCU	
2018	Olivia Nelson-Ododa	Winder-Barrow	Connecticut	
2017	Mikayla Coombs	Wesleyan School	Connecticut, Georgia	
2016	Jenna Staiti	West Forsyth	Maryland, Georgia	
2015	Asia Durr (2)	St. Pius	Louisville	
2014	Asia Durr	St. Pius	Louisville	
2013	Diamond DeShields	Norcross High School	North Carolina, Tennessee	
2012	Pachiyaanna Roberts	McEachern	Syracuse, Georgia	
2011	Brianna Banks	Fayette County	Connecticut	
2010	Kayla Lewis	Southwest Dekalb	Florida	
2009	Anne Marie Armstrong	Wesleyan School	Georgia	2013 WNBA draft: 3rd Rnd, 31st overall by the Atlanta Dream
2008	Anne Marie Armstrong	Wesleyan School	Georgia	2013 WNBA draft: 3rd Rnd, 31st overall by the Atlanta Dream
2007	Maya Moore	Collins Hill	Connecticut	2011 WNBA draft: 1st Rnd, 1st overall by the Minnesota Lynx
2006	Maya Moore	Collins Hill	Connecticut	2011 WNBA draft: 1st Rnd, 1st overall by the Minnesota Lynx
2005	Angel Robinson	Marietta	Georgia	2010 WNBA draft: 2nd Rnd, 20th overall by the Los Angeles Sparks
2004	Tasha Humphrey	Gainesville	Georgia	2008 WNBA draft: 1st Rnd, 11th overall by the Detroit Shock
2003	Tasha Humphrey	Gainesville	Georgia	2008 WNBA draft: 1st Rnd, 11th overall by the Detroit Shock
2002	Sherill Baker	Greater Atlanta Christian	Georgia	2006 WNBA draft: 1st Rnd, 12th overall by the New York Liberty
2001	Nikita Bell	Spencer	North Carolina	2005 WNBA draft: 2nd Rnd, 20th overall by the Detroit Shock
2000	Christi Thomas	Buford	Georgia	2004 WNBA draft: 1st Rnd, 12th overall by the Los Angeles Sparks
1999	Mary Beth Lycett	Morrow	Georgia	
1998	Sherika Wright	T.W. Josey	Ole Miss	
1997	Jill Razor	Athens Academy	Rollins College	
1996	Kiesha Brown	Woodward Academy	Georgia	
1995	Kiesha Brown	Woodward Academy	Georgia	
1994	Mahogany Hudson	Gainesville	Florida	
1993	Tracy Sadler	Hart County	North Carolina	
1992	Eddranette Arnold	Cedar Shoals	Florida A&M	
1991	Stephanie Lawrence	Morrow	North Carolina	
1990	Latrecia Drake	Morrow	Clayton State	
1989	Vicky Jones	Seminole	Georgia	
1988	Audra Smith	Baldwin	Virginia	
1987	Tammye Jenkins	Terrell County	Georgia	
1986	Miriam Walker	Central (Talbotten)	Claflin University	
1985	Traci Waites	Rockdale County	Georgia Cal State Long Beach	

== See also ==
Mr. Georgia Basketball
