= David Andrews (American football) =

American football player (born 1992)

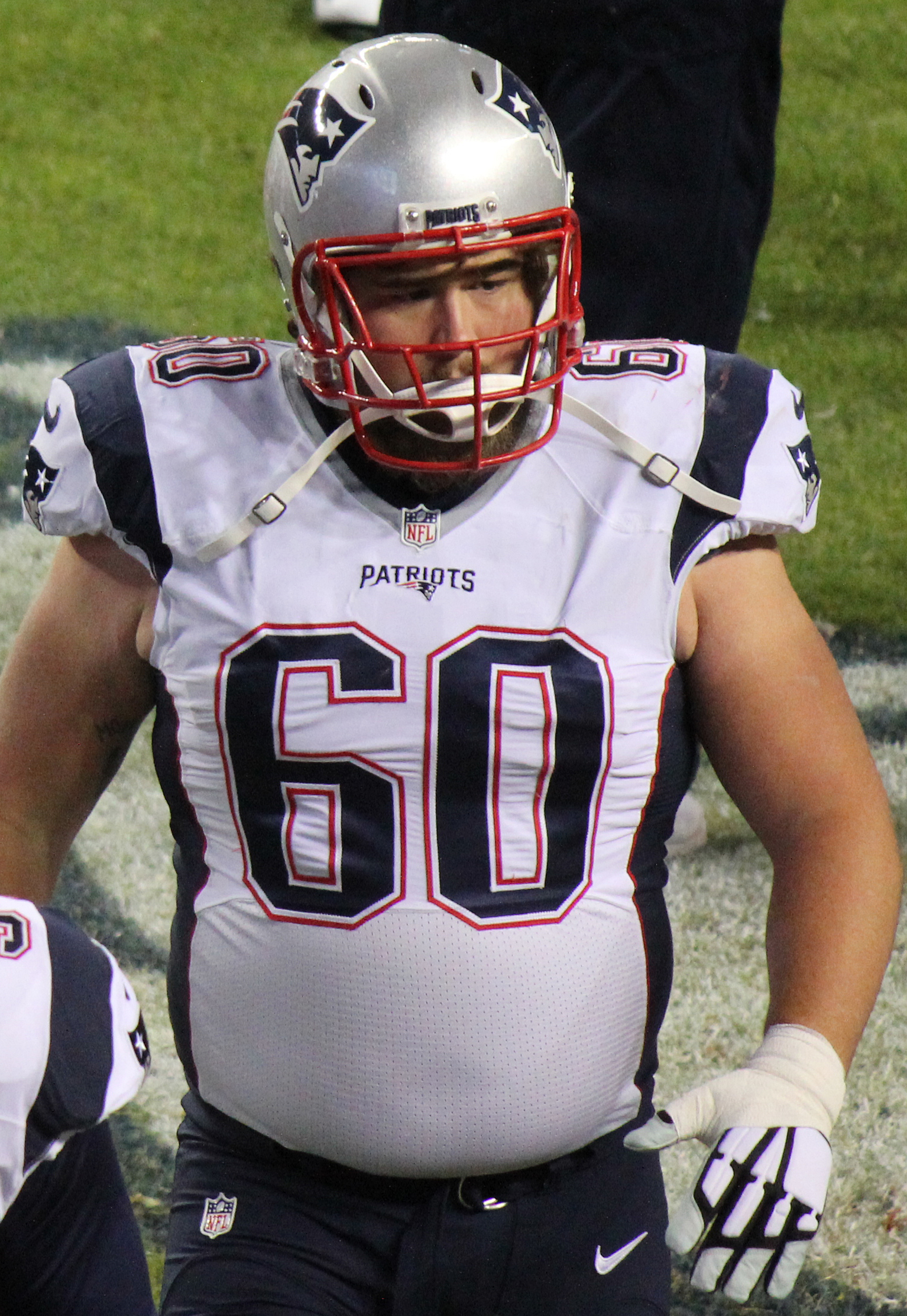
- Andrews with the New England Patriots in 2015

No. 60
- Position: Center

Personal information
- Born: July 10, 1992 (age 34); Johns Creek, Georgia, U.S.
- Listed height: 6 ft 2 in (1.88 m)
- Listed weight: 300 lb (136 kg)

Career information
- High school: Wesleyan School (Peachtree Corners, Georgia)
- College: Georgia (2011–2014)
- NFL draft: 2015: undrafted

Career history
- New England Patriots (2015–2024)

Awards and highlights
- 2× Super Bowl champion (LI, LIII); New England Patriots All-2010s Team; Second-team All-SEC (2014)

Career NFL statistics
- Games played: 124
- Games started: 121
- Fumble recoveries: 7
- Stats at Pro Football Reference

James David Andrews (born July 10, 1992) is an American former professional football player who was a center for the New England Patriots of the National Football League (NFL). He played college football for the Georgia Bulldogs.

== Early life ==
Andrews attended Wesleyan School in Peachtree Corners, Georgia, where he was a two-way lineman. In his sophomore year, Wesleyan won the 2008 GHSA Class A state championship. For his junior and senior seasons, his coaches attributed him with over a hundred knockdown blocks while not allowing a quarterback sack. Andrews was named 2010 Gwinnett County Offensive Lineman of the Year and made the All-County First-team Offense of the Gwinnett Daily Post.

Regarded as a three-star recruit by Rivals.com, Andrews was ranked as the No. 9 center prospect in the class of 2011, which was headed by Reese Dismukes. Andrews had offers from Duke and Michigan but, as a “lifelong die-hard Bulldogs fan,” waited for Georgia to offer and committed “practically on the spot” when he got the offer in February 2010.

== College career ==
In his true freshman season at Georgia, Andrews appeared in ten games. He earned Athletic Director's Honor Roll distinction for fall semester. In his sophomore year, Andrews filled the void left at center by the graduation of Ben Jones. Andrews started all 14 games, helping to protect quarterback Aaron Murray. After the Auburn game in early November, he was named Southeastern Conference (SEC) Offensive Lineman of the Week as he graded out at 88 percent and had six “dominator” blocks and three knockdowns.

As a junior, Andrews was named to the preseason watch list for the Rimington Trophy. He started all 13 games at center and protected quarterback Murray such that Georgia ranked second in passing in the SEC. At the conclusion of spring practice of his senior year, he was named Offensive MVP, and also preseason Third-team All-SEC by Phil Steele. Andrews added another 13 starts in as many games over his senior season, totaling 50 games for his college career. He won Georgia's Vince Dooley Most Valuable Player Award, was selected second-team All-SEC by the Associated Press, and was named one of six finalists for the Rimington Trophy.

== Professional career ==
Pre-draft measurables
Height	Weight	Arm length	Hand span	40-yard dash	10-yard split	20-yard split	20-yard shuttle	Three-cone drill	Vertical jump	Broad jump	Bench press
6 ft 2 1/8 in (1.88 m)	295 lb (134 kg)	32 1/8 in (0.82 m)	10 in (0.25 m)	5.12 s	1.71 s	2.87 s	4.78 s	8.12 s	30.0 in (0.76 m)	9 ft 0 in (2.74 m)	27 reps
All values from Pro Day

Andrews went undrafted in the 2015 NFL draft, but signed with the New England Patriots as a free agent on May 8, 2015. He stood out at Patriot training camp and played more than expected in preseason, starting every preseason game due to injuries to starting center Bryan Stork and reserve center/guard Ryan Wendell. Andrews made the Patriots' 53-man roster and started at center in Week 1 against the Pittsburgh Steelers after Stork was placed on injured reserve with the designation to return and Wendell was inactive. Andrews started every game through Week 10, playing every snap over the first half of the season. Although he was not selected to the 2016 Pro Bowl, Andrews finished in the top two in fan voting at the position. As a result of his high snap count and low salary, Andrews received a performance-based pay bonus of $237,427.11, the second-highest of any Patriot in 2015 (after cornerback Malcolm Butler).

In 2016, Andrews faced competition from Bryan Stork for the starting center job and ultimately won, leading to Stork's release from the team. He started all 16 regular-season games for the Patriots on an offensive line that led the team to a 14–2 record. Andrews started in Super Bowl LI against the Atlanta Falcons in the first overtime game and largest comeback in Super Bowl history; the Patriots trailed 28–3 late in the third quarter, but rallied to win by a score of 34–28.

On May 12, 2017, Andrews signed a three-year contract extension with the Patriots through the 2020 season. The deal has a base value of $9.6 million, with a $1.6 million signing bonus, and an additional $2.1 million in incentives. On September 5, 2017, Andrews was named a Patriots captain for the first time in his career. Andrews started 17 of 19 games for the Patriots, including their Super Bowl LII loss to the Philadelphia Eagles.

Andrews once again started all 16 games at center for the Patriots in 2018. Andrews helped the Patriots reach their third straight Super Bowl appearance after they defeated Los Angeles Chargers and Kansas City Chiefs in the playoffs; they defeated the Los Angeles Rams by a score of 13–3 in Super Bowl LIII. Andrews had a fumble recovery in the victory.

On August 26, 2019, it was revealed that Andrews was diagnosed with a pulmonary embolism, putting his season in jeopardy. He was placed on season-ending injured reserve on August 31.

Andrews returned to the Patriots starting lineup in 2020 after missing all of 2019. On September 26, 2020, he was placed on injured reserve after undergoing surgery on his thumb. He was activated on October 24.

On March 22, 2021, Andrews re-signed with the Patriots on a four-year deal.

Andrews remained the starting center for the Patriots in the 2022 and 2023 seasons.

On October 4, 2024, Andrews was placed on season-ending injured reserve, after suffering a shoulder injury in Week 4 against the San Francisco 49ers.

Andrews was released by the Patriots on March 13, 2025, after ten seasons with the team. Andrews announced his retirement on May 28 and participated in a retirement ceremony at Gillette Stadium on June 2.

== Post retirement ==
After retiring, Andrews joined NBC Sports Boston. It was later announced that he and former teammate Brian Hoyer would be starting their own football podcast named The Quick Snap. It debuted in September of 2025. Andrews also makes weekly appearances every Monday on Zolak and Bertrand to break down that week's New England Patriots game. David Andrews competes in The Dozen Trivia Competition, presented by Barstool Sports. Andrews is a member of the Ice Dawgs along with Marty Mush and former NHL player Keith Yandle

== Personal life ==
Andrews and his wife Mackenzie were married on April 8, 2017. His uncle, the late Dan Reeves, played and coached in the NFL. Andrews and his wife have two sons.

Andrews is involved with multiple charities in the New England area. He hosts a yearly celebrity bowling charity event called Strikes for Tykes, with the proceeds going to organizations that support physical and mental health for children and families. Some of his other charitable acts include "Saving by Shaving" for cancer research, working with animal adoption drives along with visiting sick children in the hospital.
