= Spalding Drive =

Street in Atlanta, Georgia, US

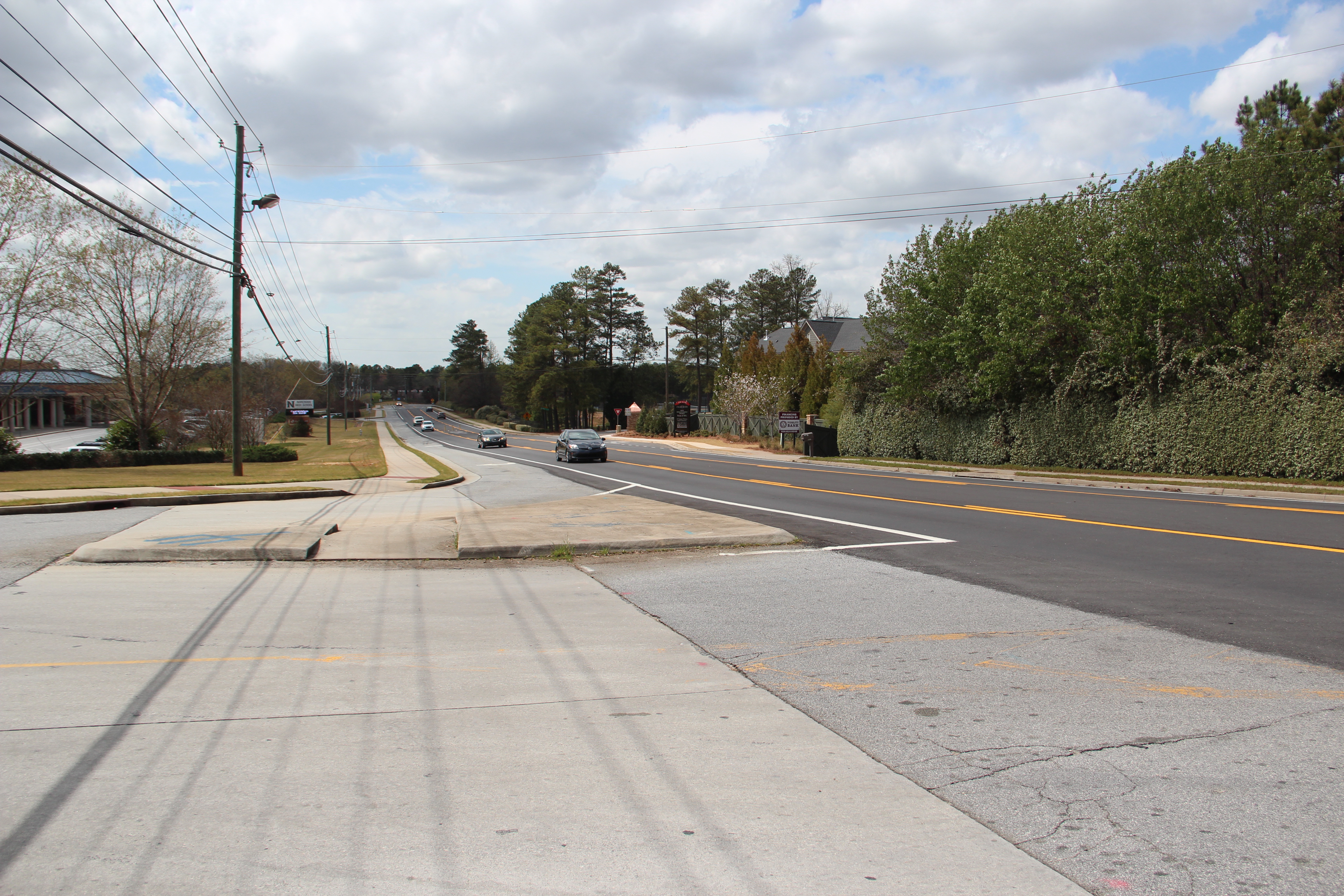
- Spalding Drive in front of Norcross High School
- Interactive map of Spalding Drive
- Former names: Old Roswell Road; Jett Ferry Road; Lawrenceville Road
- Length: 12 miles (19 km)
- Location: Atlanta, Georgia, U.S.
- Coordinates: 33°58′5.3″N 84°15′29.5″W

Spalding Drive is an approximately 12 miles (19 km) east–west road connecting four suburban cities in north Atlanta: Sandy Springs, Dunwoody, Peachtree Corners, and Norcross. For most of its length, that roughly parallels the Chattahoochee River, it is lined on both sides with residential neighborhoods and private homes. Spalding Drive traverses a hilly topography and is subject to dangerous curves at many points. However, after crossing Peachtree Corners Circle, the road becomes flatter and more commercialized, passing by many office parks, and the Peachtree Corners post office and library. Norcross High School is located just before the road's eastern terminus within the Norcross city limits.

== History ==
Spalding Drive likely evolved from an Indian trail. The road, which traverses an area adjacent to the Chattahoochee River, was once considered a further-out alternative to Buckhead's Pace's Ferry for the summer vacation homes of wealthy Atlantans, including Winship Nunnally, owner of the Nunnally Candy Company; General Lucius Clay, a World War II and Cold War general known for his involvement in the Berlin air lift; Baxter Maddox, founder of the First National Bank of Atlanta (later Wachovia and now Wells Fargo); and Frank Neely, CEO of Rich's (now Macy's).

=== Name ===
The road was named after the Spalding family, who owned a large amount of land in Sandy Springs.

The original name of Spalding Drive west of Roberts Drive and east of its terminus at Roswell Road was Old Roswell Road. This portion was located in what was then Milton County. It was renamed to Spalding Drive in 1929. The original name of Spalding Drive east of Roberts Drive and west of Winters Chapel Road was Jett Ferry Road, named after the Jett Ferry of the Chattahoochee River that it provided access to. This section, which travels through the Dunwoody Panhandle of Sandy Springs, was located in what was then DeKalb County. After Milton County merged with Fulton County in 1932, the Dunwoody Panhandle was ceded to Fulton County, and the road was renamed Spalding Drive. The original name of Spalding Drive east of Winters Chapel Road and west of its terminus at Medlock Bridge Road (it continues straight as South Old Peachtree Road) in Gwinnett County, was Lawrenceville Road.
