= Peachtree Corners, Georgia =

City in the United States

- City
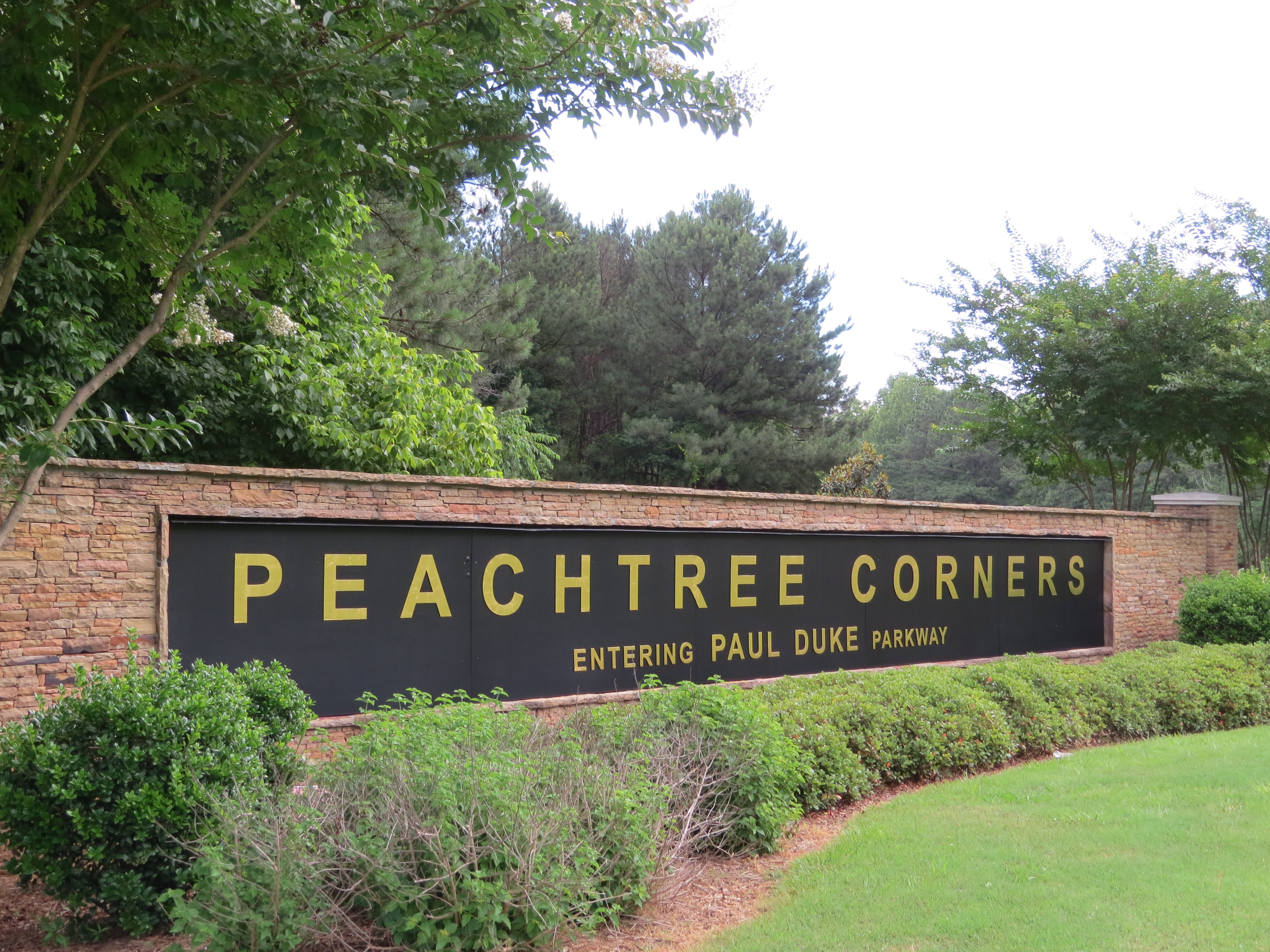
- Entrance to Peachtree Corners at Peachtree Blvd and Peachtree Pkwy

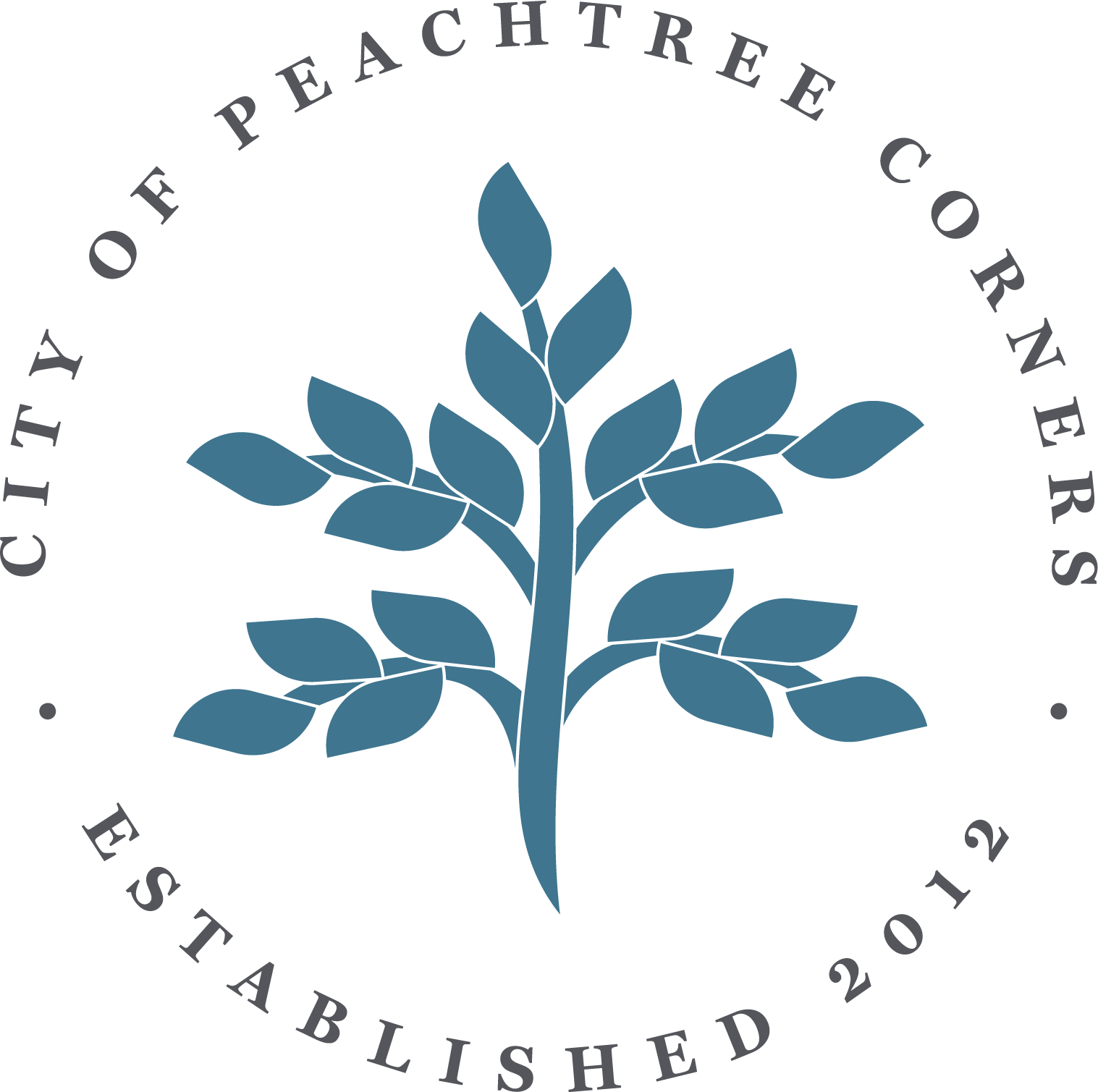
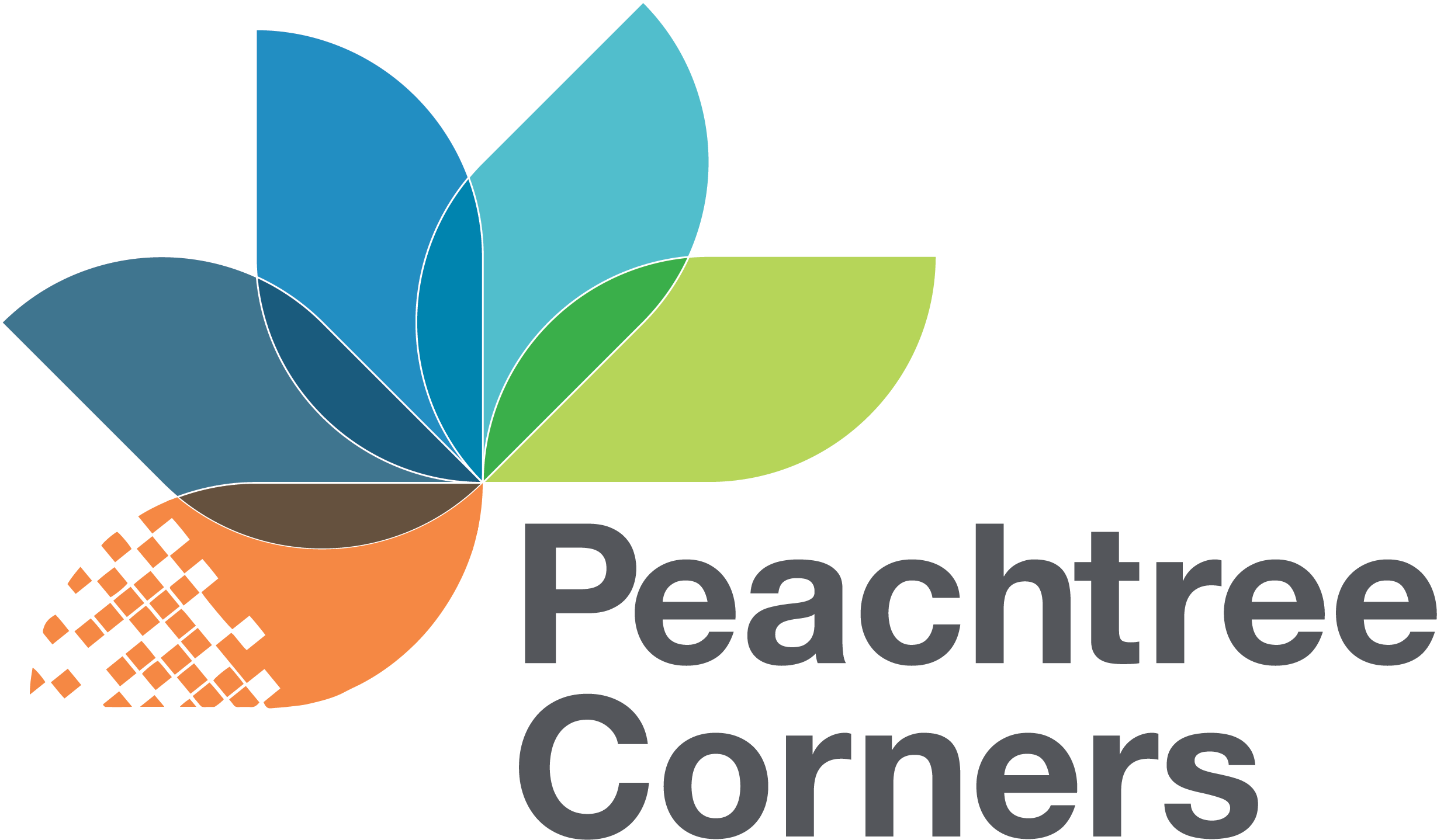
- Seal Official Logo
- Nicknames: The Corners, PTC
- Motto: Innovative & Remarkable
- Location within Gwinnett county
- Coordinates: 33°58′12″N 84°13′17″W
- Country: United States
- State: Georgia
- County: Gwinnett
- Incorporated: July 1, 2012

Government
  - Type: Council-Manager
  - Mayor: Mike Mason
  - City Manager: Brian Johnson

Area
  - Total: 16.23 sq mi (42.03 km^{2})
  - Land: 16.10 sq mi (41.71 km^{2})
  - Water: 0.12 sq mi (0.32 km^{2})
- Elevation: 994 ft (303 m)

Population (2020)
  - Total: 42,243
  - Density: 2,623.0/sq mi (1,012.75/km^{2})
- Time zone: UTC-5 (Eastern (EST))
  - Summer (DST): UTC-4 (EDT)
- ZIP codes: 30010, 30071, 30092, 30096, 30097
- Area codes: 770, 678, 404, 470
- FIPS code: 13-59735
- GNIS feature ID: 2710337
- Website: peachtreecornersga.gov

Peachtree Corners is a city in Gwinnett County, Georgia, United States. It is part of the Atlanta metropolitan area, and is the largest city in Gwinnett County with a population of 42,243 as of the 2020 U.S. census.

Peachtree Corners is the only Atlanta northern suburb developed as a planned community. The city is bordered to the north and west by the Chattahoochee River and is located east of Dunwoody.

== History ==
=== Settlement ===
Prior to 1818, the western corner of what became Gwinnett County was Creek and Cherokee territory, and it was illegal for white families to settle there. Nevertheless, there were several families of white squatters in the area before settlement was legalized. In the early 1800s, a road was built along a Native American trail from what is now Buford, past what is now Peachtree Corners, to what is now Atlanta. A small farming community, known as "Pinckneyville," grew up along that road. By 1827, the community was home to the second school in Gwinnett County, the Washington Academy, founded on what is now Spalding Drive. The area was also home to a post office, saloon, blacksmith shop, carpenter shop and inn; however, the prosperity of Pinckneyville was to be short-lived.

In 1870, a railroad was built through neighboring Norcross, and due to the heavy trading that could be done via the railroad, all of the area's businesses and many residents moved from Pinckneyville to Norcross.

=== Urban development ===
For the next century, the area remained a rural farming community. In the late 1960s, Paul Duke developed the idea of creating Peachtree Corners, a planned community to be constructed in the area that was once known as Pinckneyville. In 1967, Duke initiated the planning of the office component of Peachtree Corners: Technology Park Atlanta, a campus for high technology industries that would benefit from employing engineers and business people graduating from the Georgia Institute of Technology (Georgia Tech), the University of Georgia, and other universities with technology and business schools. As a member of the Georgia Tech National Advisory Board, he raised $1.7 million to develop the business center. Initial residents of the technology park included GE, Scientific Atlanta (now part of Cisco Systems), and Hayes Microcomputer Products. In 1968, Duke established Peachtree Corners, Inc., a development corporation for the residential parts of the community.

During the 1970s, Jim Cowart began to develop the neighborhoods that Duke had planned. Initial neighborhoods developed by Cowart included Peachtree Station, Chattahoochee Station, and Spalding Corners. During this period, Cowart developed more upscale housing and laid more sewer pipes than the rest of Gwinnett County.

=== Incorporation ===
The United Peachtree Corners Civic Association (UPCCA), an umbrella group of neighborhood homeowners' associations, was formed in 1993 in response to land use and development concerns in the area. Despite the efforts of the UPCCA, some development opposed by the UPCCA continued in Peachtree Corners throughout the 1990s; therefore, in 1999, the idea of incorporating Peachtree Corners was first proposed. Nonetheless, due to the complexity of existing law, an incorporation movement did not then materialize. A city of Peachtree Corners was again proposed by the UPCCA in 2005, but efforts were abandoned after a straw survey of some residents seemed to indicate that the majority did not support incorporation.

In 2010 the UPCCA again pursued the incorporation of Peachtree Corners after a failed attempt by the city of Norcross to annex a portion of Technology Park Atlanta. In a referendum held on November 8, 2011, residents of Peachtree Corners voted to incorporate as Gwinnett County's 16th city, and, with a population of 43,059, it became the county's largest. Municipal operations began on July 1, 2012.

== Geography ==
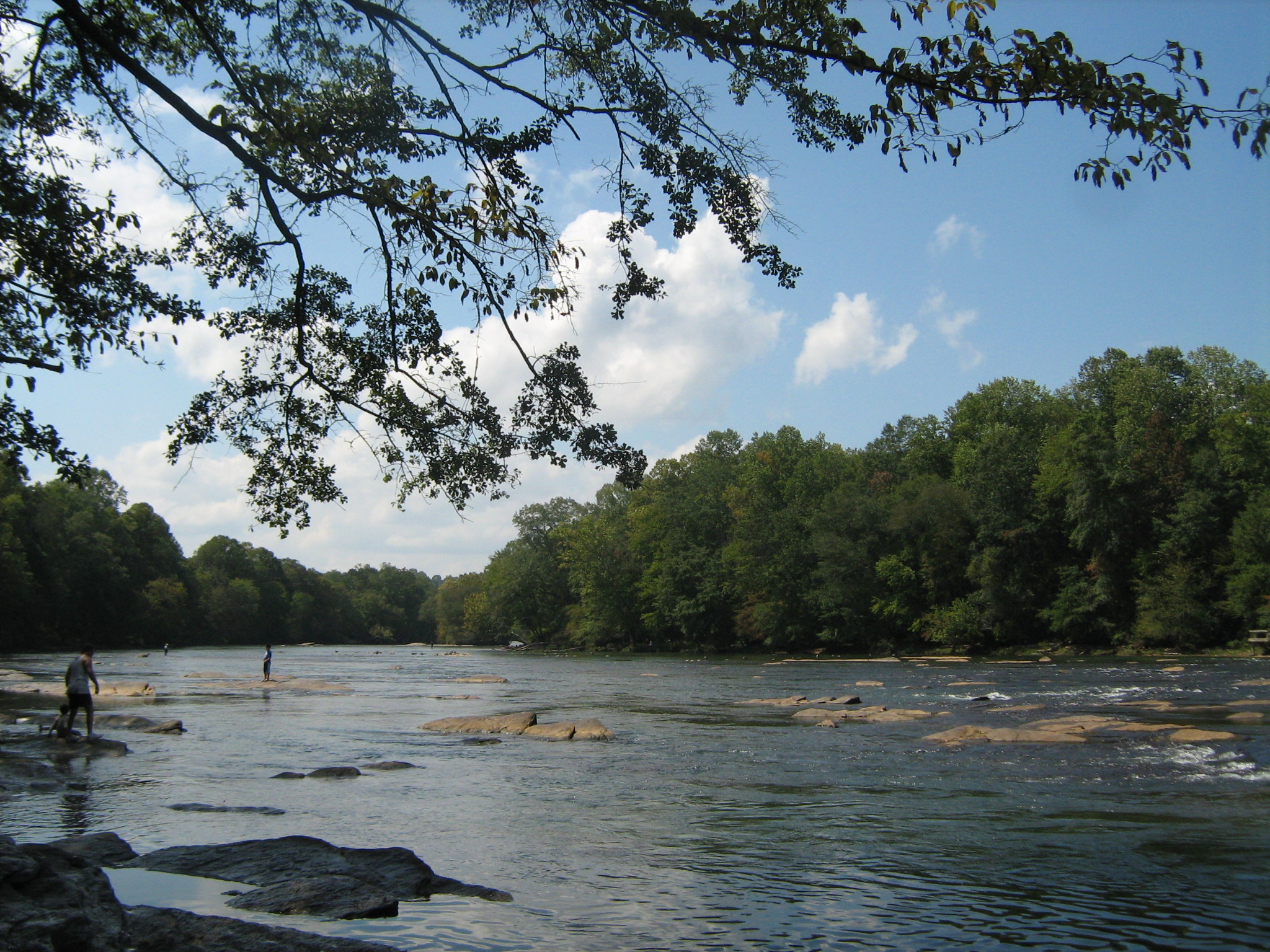
The Chattahoochee River, seen here at Jones Bridge Park, flows through many of Peachtree Corners' neighborhoods.

Peachtree Corners is located in the western corner of Gwinnett County, 21 miles (33 km) from downtown Atlanta. Seven miles of the Chattahoochee River define the northern and western border of Peachtree Corners, and it is bordered by the cities of Dunwoody, Doraville, and Sandy Springs (DeKalb and Fulton counties) on the west, Buford Highway and Norcross city limits on the south, Roswell and Johns Creek (both in Fulton County) across the Chattahoochee River on the north, and the city limits of Berkeley Lake and Duluth on the east.

== Demographics ==
=== 2020 census ===
As of the 2020 census, Peachtree Corners had a population of 42,243. The median age was 36.5 years. 23.0% of residents were under the age of 18 and 12.3% of residents were 65 years of age or older. For every 100 females there were 94.4 males, and for every 100 females age 18 and over there were 91.8 males age 18 and over.

100.0% of residents lived in urban areas, while 0.0% lived in rural areas.

There were 17,071 households and 10,668 families; 32.2% had children under the age of 18 living in them. Of all households, 44.9% were married-couple households, 19.8% were households with a male householder and no spouse or partner present, and 29.0% were households with a female householder and no spouse or partner present. About 28.2% of all households were made up of individuals and 6.4% had someone living alone who was 65 years of age or older.

There were 18,028 housing units, of which 5.3% were vacant. The homeowner vacancy rate was 1.3% and the rental vacancy rate was 7.4%.

Peachtree Corners racial composition as of 2020
Race	Num.	Perc.
White	20,013	47.4%
Black or African American	9,795	23.2%
American Indian and Alaska Native	261	0.6%
Asian	3,967	9.4%
Native Hawaiian and Other Pacific Islander	27	0.1%
Some other race	3,832	9.1%
Two or more races	4,348	10.3%
Hispanic or Latino (of any race)	7,661	18.1%

Historical population
Census	Pop.	Note	%±
2020	42,243		—
2025 (est.)	42,519	▲	0.7%
U.S. Decennial Census; 2025

=== 2017–2019 estimates ===
Since Peachtree Corners was not a city or a census-designated place at the time, no demographic data is available for the city from the 2010 U.S. census. However, the city contains ZIP code 30092, which in 2017 had an average adjusted gross income (AGI) of $69,905 per household. The median home price in 2017 for Peachtree Corners was $325,000. The median household income (in 2019 dollars) was $71,149, and the per capita income was $43,783. As of 2017, Peachtree Corners was 60.2% White American, 23.3% African American, 9.6% Asian American, and 2.5% two or more races. Hispanic Americans of any race made up 14% of the population. Those living in the same house more than one year were 86.9% of the population, an average of 2.62 persons lived in each household, of the population 94.1% had a high school diploma or higher, 52.6% had a Bachelor's degree or higher with 19% of the population having a Master's degree or higher, and, not counting library or school supplied computers, 96.5% of the population or above had home computers. ZIP Code 30092 had a population of 38,008 at the 2010 census; however, with parts of ZIP Codes 30071, 30096, 30097, and 30360 being within the city limits of Peachtree Corners, the estimated population of the city was 43,509 in 2017 with a population increase of 14.5% from 2010.

== Economy ==
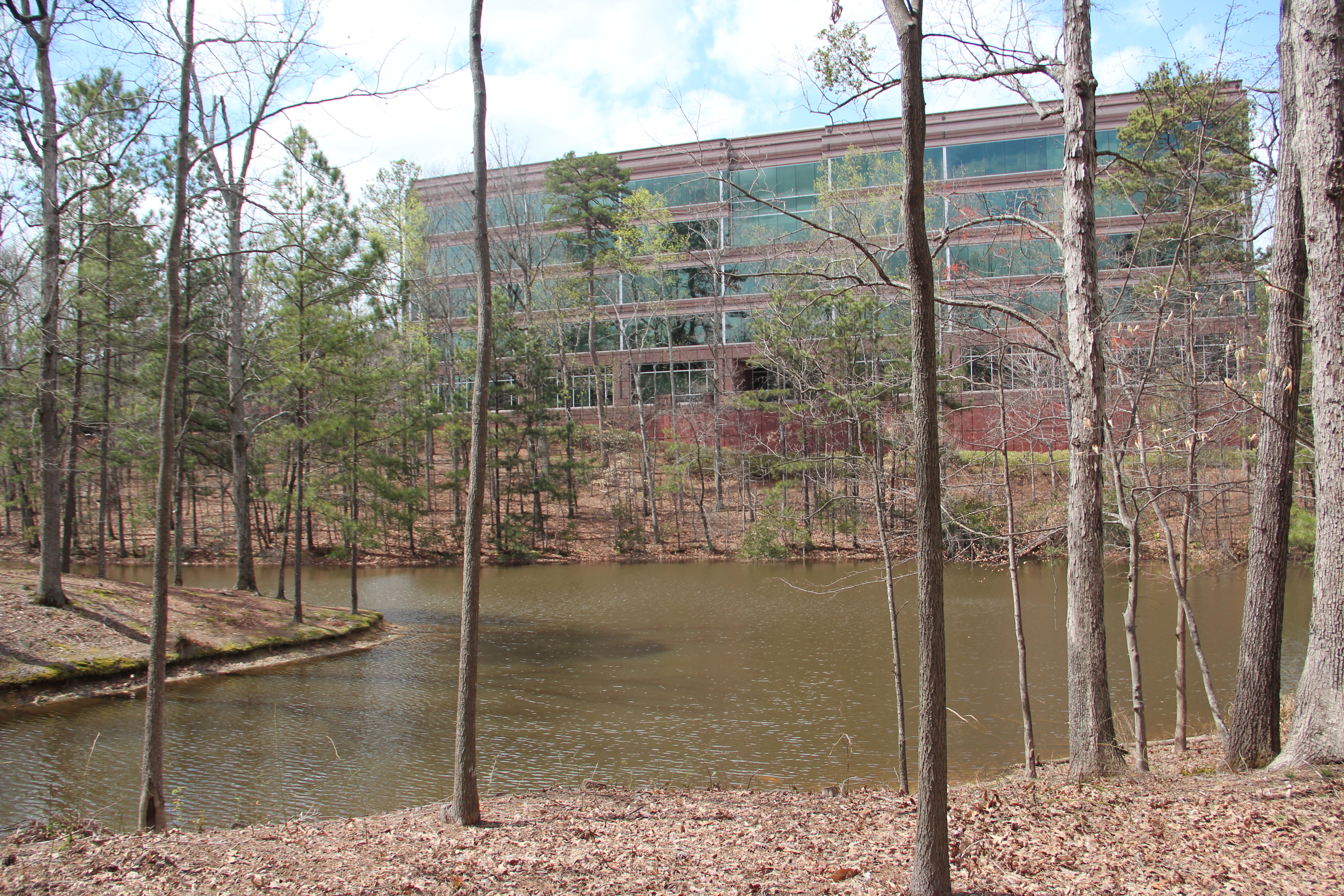
Building on Triangle Parkway in wintertime

The economy of Peachtree Corners is largely driven by the concentration of businesses in planned office parks, particularly engineering firms, logistics organizations, health technology groups, and information technology companies.

In October 2014, United Arab Shipping Company relocated its North American Headquarters to Peachtree Corners. The company purchased a 50,000 square foot office building on Spalding Drive for logistics, accounting and customer service operations. In 2017 it merged with Hapag-Lloyd, keeping its headquarters in Peachtree Corners, investing an additional $5.5 million, and adding 363 new jobs to expand its offices. With 230 vessels and more than 12,000 employees, Hapag-Lloyd is the fifth-largest shipping company in the world, serving customers in 127 countries.

In May 2016, Comcast Corporation, the American global telecommunications conglomerate and owner of Xfinity and NBCUniversal, relocated its Southeast Headquarters to the Wells Building, a 10-story office building in Peachtree Corners.

In August 2021, the NASDAQ-100 and S&P 500 company, Intuitive Surgical announced its expansion of its Peachtree Corners facility, building an additional $600 million, 750,000 square foot, net zero carbon footprint, medical campus in the city, adding 1,200 new jobs and adding to the cluster of many medical, biomedical, biopharmaceutical, and health information technology companies that are in Peachtree Corners.

Soliant Health, a leading provider of specialized healthcare and education staffing services to hospitals and schools around the nation, expanded its Peachtree Corners headquarters to 83,000 square feet.

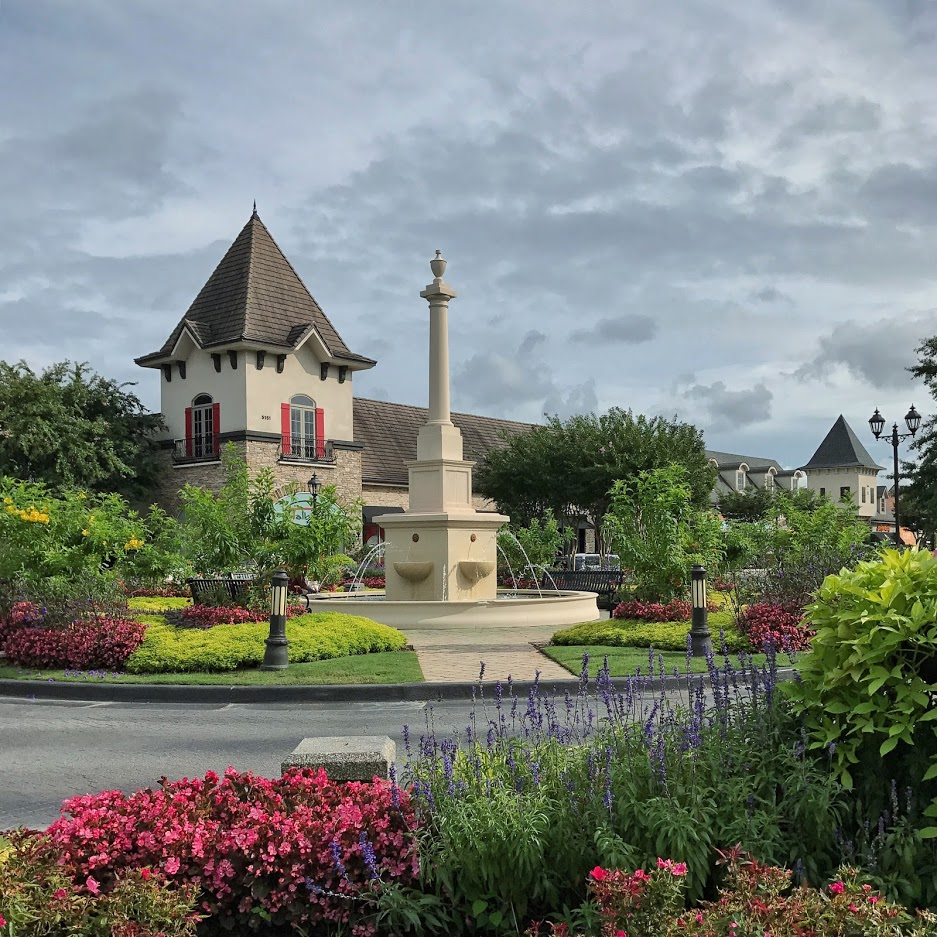
View of the central fountain in The Forum

Amazon, CarMax, and Mass Mutual as well as Honeywell, Sprint Corporation, Siemens Industry Automation, Valmet, Fleetcor, Crawford & Company, ASHRAE, ACI Worldwide, Simmons Bedding Company, and CMD Group are among the over 2,300 businesses with a presence in Peachtree Corners. ASHRAE's world headquarters moved to Peachtree Corner's Technology Park Atlanta, with the company investing $15.7 million in its Peachtree Corners world location. Siemens Smart Infrastructure has its headquarters in Peachtree Corners. The Harlem Globetrotters are also headquartered in Peachtree Corners as well as the Southern Section of the United States Tennis Association (USTA). Peachtree Corners has 12 hotels to serve business travelers and visitors including Hilton, Marriott, and Hyatt.

Jointly working with Deutsche Telekom's T-Mobile and Georgia Tech, Peachtree Corners developed a 5G incubator known as Curiosity Lab located in a 500-acre smart city technology park in the city, one of the nation's first smart city environments. The facility features a 25,000 square foot Innovation Center and 3-mile autonomous vehicle test track and provides developers the ability to build and test such things as autonomous vehicles, robotics, industrial drone applications, mixed reality training and entertainment, remote medical care, personal health and fitness wearables, and other technologies. Jacobs Engineering Group, Peachtree Corners, Delta Air Lines, Bosch, Cisco Systems, and Qualcomm are also jointly working to deploy smart system technologies in the city through technology that connects vehicles and infrastructure, focusing initially on roadside infrastructure, traffic management, and road safety. Further, Peachtree Corners is host to the Vehicle-to-everything (V2X) conference which involves development of intelligent transport systems including Vehicle-to-vehicle (V2V), Vehicle-to-infrastructure (V2I), and Vehicle-to-Pedestrian (V2P) communications and includes biometric technology, managing cities autonomously, and developing highway systems to make transportation safer, reduce traffic congestion, and reduce the environmental impact of automobiles and other road vehicles. Curiosity Lab was named winner in IDC Government Insights’ Fourth Annual Smart Cities North America Awards for Transportation.

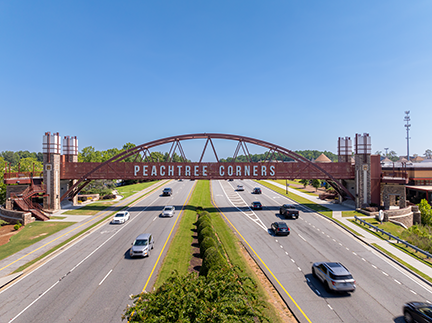
Pedestrian bridge connecting The Forum with Town Center

The French-American Chamber of Commerce moved its operations from the Consulate General of France in Atlanta to office space within the Innovation Center at Curiosity Lab. In relation to the move, La French Tech – a French government-supported ecosystem of startups, investors, decision-makers and community builders – will expand collaboration with Peachtree Corners as it guides companies looking to develop technologies and expand into North America.

Funded by the city, Peachtree Corners has produced a non-profit business incubator affiliated with the Technology Development Center at Georgia Tech as part of the city's Curiosity Lab that provides for software and hardware technology startups, providing these companies with the support they need to launch new products and grow.

== Arts and culture ==
Peachtree Corners has an annual Summer Concert Series set on the Town Green at the city's Town Center featuring performers from across the nation.

Annually, Peachtree Corners' "Art on the Chattahoochee" is held along the banks of the Chattahoochee River at Jones Bridge Park that attracts visitors who peruse the work of artists. Also featured are live demonstrations and performing arts including solo, acoustic and group performances, as well as a Budding Artist Kid's Zone with activities including craft stations, spin and chalk art, and food and refreshments.

Other annual events include the "Peachtree Corners Festival" that includes arts and crafts, live music, shows, and food, as well as the "Holiday Glow on the Town Green" evening event featuring live choral performances and the lighting of the great tree and 6-foot Menorah. Peachtree Corners also hosts the Atlanta Sci-Fi Film Festival supported by HBO.

The Gwinnett County Public Library system operates the Peachtree Corners branch in Peachtree Corners.

== Parks and recreation ==
Peachtree Corners has multiple parks including the Chattahoochee River National Recreation Area along the Chattahoochee River, the Medlock Bridge Chattahoochee River National Recreation Area with river access, the 12 acre Holcomb Bridge Park overlooking the river and having improvements including an amphitheater, the 30 acre Jones Bridge Park with pavilions, a community building, soccer fields, other enhancements, and river frontage, as well as the 93 acre multiple amenity Pinckneyville Park. The 227-acre (918,636.41 m^{2}) Simpsonwood Park has 2,140 linear feet (652.27 m) of river frontage along the Chattahoochee River.

Peachtree Corners is home to the headquarters for the Southern Section of the United States Tennis Association (USTA).

Peachtree Corners has an outdoor mall, The Forum on Peachtree Parkway, with multiple restaurants and boutique shops. The Peachtree Corners Town Center, which is on the other side of Peachtree Parkway across from The Forum, also has multiple restaurants, as well as a movie theater, an amphitheater, a 2,500-square-foot Veterans Monument organized by the Peachtree Corners Veterans Monument Association, and the Town Green. The $103 million project was developed in a partnership between the city government of Peachtree Corners and Fuqua Development. A thrust arch style 14-foot wide walkway pedestrian bridge crossing Peachtree Parkway features two elevators and two sets of stairs and connects the Town Center and The Forum. The bridge also connects to a trail along the stream that is adjacent to the Town Center that is part of the Corners Connector Trail system, which system provides passage to trails along Peachtree Corners Circle and Medlock Bridge Road as well as to paths that stretch north to the city of Duluth and beyond.

Each year Peachtree Corners conducts public participation road running events including the four mile (6.437 kilometers) “Light Up The Corners Glow Run” and the one kilometer “Twilight Trot”.

== Government ==
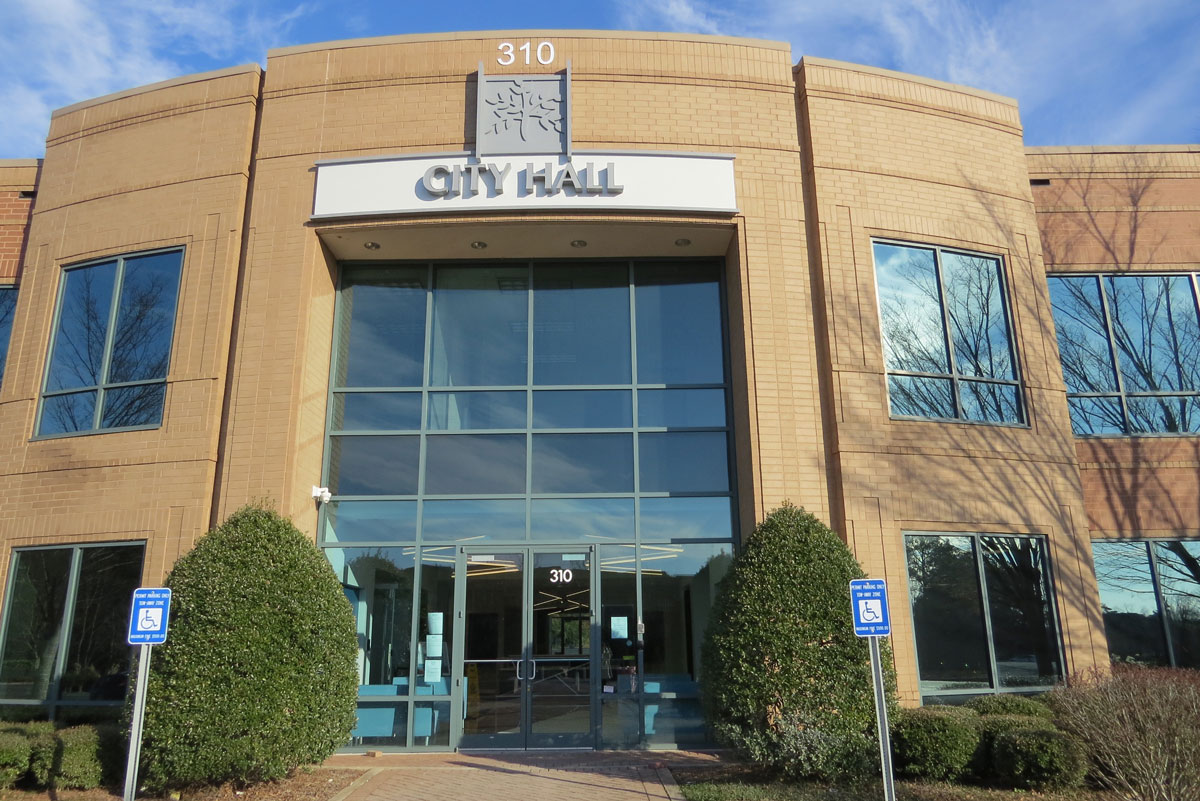
Peachtree Corners City Hall

The City of Peachtree Corners was incorporated on July 1, 2012, and provides many services. These include land-use planning, zoning, infrastructure maintenance and improvements, capital improvements, other public works, zoning enforcement, promulgation of building and environmental ordinances, business licensing and enforcement of them, and solid waste collection, among others. Peachtree Corners has a Council-Manager form of government. The city is governed by a mayor and six city council members which are elected to four-year terms. The city employees Peachtree Corners has in charge of day-to-day operations include a city manager, city clerk, and a community development director. The city also has code enforcement personnel, building officials, and department directors. Departments in the city include Communications, Community Development, Finance, Downtown Development Authority, and Public Works. The city has its own municipal court, employs a city attorney, and has POST certified city marshals.

The city is authorized to collect property taxes of up to one millage a year, though the city has thus far operated only on business license, franchise, and other fees without levying any property taxes. Because of this, Peachtree Corners has lower county taxes than unincorporated Gwinnett County. special-purpose local-option sales tax (SPLOST), Georgia Department of Transportation, and federal grant dollars contribute to the funding of capital projects.

=== City Council ===
Following incorporation, the first elections for Mayor and City Council were held in Spring 2012. Subsequent elections have been held in November of every other year, starting in 2013. The mayor is Mike Mason.

== Education ==
Gwinnett County Public Schools (GCPS) is the public school district covering Peachtree Corners.

The following schools have attendance boundaries including parts of Peachtree Corners:

- Peachtree, Simpson, Stripling (in Norcross), and Norcross (in Norcross) elementary schools. All except Norcross ES feed into Pinckneyville Middle School while Norcross ES feeds into Summerour Middle School in Norcross. All such areas feed into Norcross High School and Paul Duke STEM High School, both in Norcross. Norcross High School is the only GCPS school with a IB Diploma Programme.
- A portion is zoned to Berkeley Lake Elementary School (in Berkeley Lake), Duluth Middle School (in Duluth) and Duluth High School.

Other area county public schools include Gwinnett School of Mathematics, Science, and Technology, North Metro Academy of Performing Arts, and McClure Health Science High School.

Wesleyan School (K-12th grade) and Cornerstone Christian Academy (K-8th grade) are private schools located in Peachtree Corners.

A charter school, the International Charter Academy of Georgia that has a bilingual English and Japanese education program opened in 2018 for K-5th grade.

Nearby is another charter school, the New Life Academy of Excellence (K-8th grade) that has a bilingual English and Chinese education program.

The Gwinnett County Public Library system operates the Peachtree Corners branch in Peachtree Corners.

== Media ==
As part of the Metro Atlanta area, the city's primary network-affiliated television stations are WXIA-TV (NBC), WANF (independent), WUPA-TV (CBS), WSB-TV (ABC), and WAGA-TV (Fox). There are seven additional local stations that are accessible over the air without the need of cable, etc. access. The city also is served by WGTV and WABE-TV, which are PBS member stations, with WGTV being the flagship station of the statewide Georgia Public Television network. Several TV services provide Peachtree Corners with cable, DSL, fiber and satellite TV broadcasts and Internet including AT&T U-verse/DIRECTV, Charter/Spectrum, Comcast/Xfinity, and DISH Network.

Additionally, there are approximately 23 business Internet providers for Peachtree Corners.

The city is served by approximately 50 radio stations and by two daily newspapers, the Atlanta Journal-Constitution and the Gwinnett Daily Post, with the Daily Post being Gwinnett County's legal organ.

Peachtree Corners has a website that supplies information about the city and where residents can subscribe to emails that regularly supply information to them. The city publishes a bimonthly feature magazine, Peachtree Corners Magazine, available in print and online, that informs readers about new city events and discusses topics related to the city. It is mailed to residents for free, and is also distributed to multiple points around the city. The city also publishes the Peachtree Corners Business Newsletter, a monthly business newsletter to promote 2-way communication between the city and its business community.

The former site of BJ's Wholesale Club was used as the set of the 2012 movie The Watch starring Ben Stiller, Vince Vaughn, and Jonah Hill. A home on Fitzpatrick Way in Peachtree Corners was used as a filming location for the 2015 movie Barely Lethal starring Sophie Turner, Jessica Alba, and Samuel L. Jackson. The film used Simpsonwood Park as the staging area. In 2021, Jones Bridge Park and the area of Peachtree Industrial Blvd. and Holcomb Bridge Rd. in Peachtree Corners were the sites of the filming of season 4 of the Netflix production of Ozark starring Jason Bateman, Laura Linney, Julia Garner, Jordana Spiro, Jason Butler Harner, Esai Morales, Peter Mullan, Janet McTeer, and others.

== Infrastructure ==
=== Transportation ===
==== Roads ====
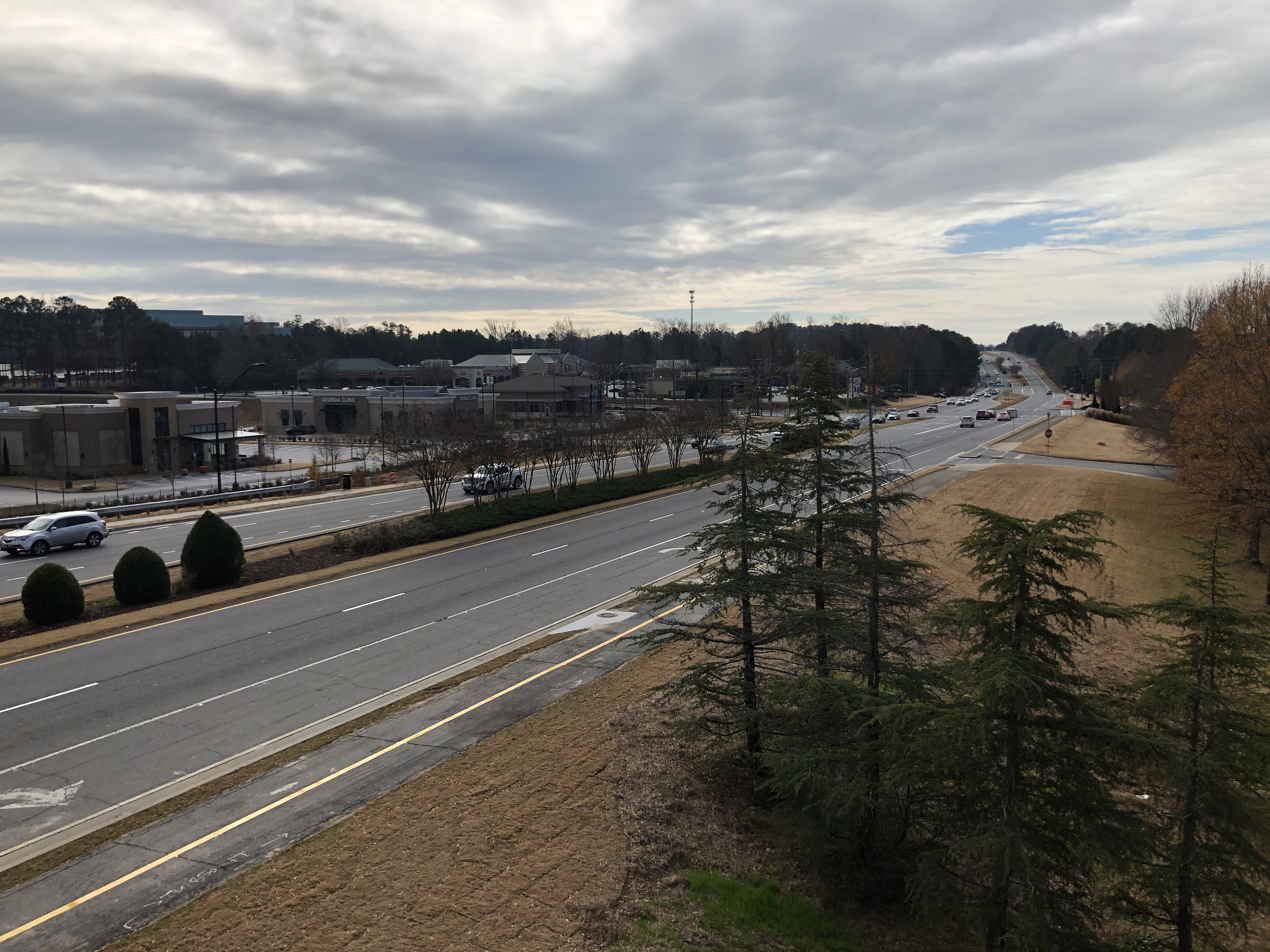
Ga Route 141 - Peachtree Parkway in Peachtree Corners

Peachtree Corners is in proximity to many major highways in Metro Atlanta, such as I-285, I-85, GA 316, and GA 400. The city is approximately 21 miles (33 km) northeast of downtown Atlanta. A number of collector roads distribute traffic around the city, including GA 141 (Peachtree Parkway/Medlock Bridge Road), GA 140 (Holcomb Bridge Road), Peachtree Corners Circle, Spalding Drive and Peachtree Boulevard.

==== Electric Vehicle and Infrastructure Support ====
Peachtree Corners has implemented support for electric vehicles having installed one of the State of Georgia's largest electric vehicle charging facilities that provides charging without cost to users, and installing the country's first roadway surface solar panel system to support it, with plans for further expansion of roadway solar power collection and charging facilities and including solar power for existing infrastructure across the city by installing other types of panels that may include sidewalk, bike lane, and other surface collectors.

==== Transit ====
Ride Gwinnett serves the city. The Metropolitan Atlanta Rapid Transit Authority (MARTA)'s Doraville Rapid Rail Station is approximately 5.7 miles (9.2 km) from Peachtree Corners, while the Chamblee Rapid Rail Station is approximately 9.3 miles (15.0 km) away. MARTA provides rapid heavy rail service and connecting services to Atlanta, Hartsfield–Jackson Atlanta International Airport, and other points north, south, east and west. The city also has an operating autonomous shuttle that operates on a stretch of road on Technology Parkway.

==== Airports ====
Peachtree–DeKalb Airport is a county-owned, public-use airport approximately 7.9 miles (12.7 km) from Peachtree Corners. Gwinnett County Airport is a municipal airport located about 18 miles (29 km) from the city. Hartsfield–Jackson Atlanta International Airport, which is a major passenger hub for domestic and international travelers, is located 29 miles (47 km) south of Peachtree Corners. It is accessible by I-85, I-285, and MARTA.

==== Pedestrians and cycling ====
The Western Gwinnett Bikeway is a multi-use trail along Peachtree Industrial Boulevard. It is a shared use path, cycle track, and bike lane connecting to neighboring Duluth and Norcross. Peachtree Corners has been adding additional sidewalks and safety upgrades for pedestrians, thus far adding many miles of sidewalks, additional pedestrian safety crossings, and adding 175 street lights, all designed to make the city more walkable, safer and more connected. The city also has a 14-foot wide walkway arch truss pedestrian bridge with elevators and stairs over S.R. 141 (Peachtree Parkway) for pedestrians walking between The Forum and the Town Center. The city is also adding to a multi-use trail system (the Corners Connector Trail system) that crisscrosses the city linking office parks, restaurants, retail centers, the new town center and surrounding neighborhoods. In addition, the city has launched the world's first fleet of shared E-scooters with teleoperated repositioning, and is the first city in the nation to make citywide accessibility available that provides information technology to public spaces and local businesses to improve accessibility for residents and visitors initially with support for the blind and visually impaired. The system includes the delivery of instantaneous audio to help the impaired navigate both indoor and outdoor environments through a combination of GPS and smart beacons.

=== Software ===
Peachtree Corners has its own smartphone app, "CornersConnect", for the use of citizens and visitors to keep up with events, dining, entertainment, public parks, bus routes, city information, and news, and to help users pay their water bill, county property taxes, to register to vote, and to photograph and report areas that need improvement across the city.

=== Police, fire, and emergency services ===
Peachtree Corners is served by Gwinnett County Fire and Rescue Department's Stations 1, 4, 11, and 19, and is served by the West Precinct of the Gwinnett Police Department that includes two six-member Response Teams that are responsible for responding to any issues or concerns that arise in Peachtree Corners. Complimenting the Gwinnett Police, the city employs its own POST certified city marshals.

== Notable people ==
- David Andrews, NFL football player with the New England Patriots.
- Brice Butler, NFL wide receiver with the Dallas Cowboys.
- Scott Hilton - real estate investment firm executive and member of the Georgia House of Representatives.
- Chandler Massey, actor including in Days of Our Lives
- Jodie Meeks, NBA shooting guard with the Washington Wizards
- John Oxendine, businessman, attorney, former four term Georgia insurance commissioner.
- James Ramsey, Major League Baseball player with the Los Angeles Dodgers.
- Trey Thompkins, professional basketball player formerly with Los Angeles Clippers.
