= Clint Boling =

American football player (born 1989)

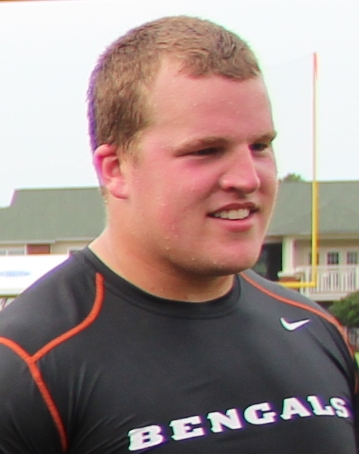
- Boling with the Cincinnati Bengals in 2013

No. 65
- Position: Guard

Personal information
- Born: May 9, 1989 (age 37); Alpharetta, Georgia, U.S.
- Listed height: 6 ft 5 in (1.96 m)
- Listed weight: 305 lb (138 kg)

Career information
- High school: Chattahoochee (Johns Creek, Georgia)
- College: Georgia
- NFL draft: 2011: 4th round, 101st overall pick

Career history
- Cincinnati Bengals (2011–2018)

Awards and highlights
- 2× First-team All-SEC (2008, 2010); Second-team All-SEC (2009)

Career NFL statistics
- Games played: 111
- Games started: 109
- Stats at Pro Football Reference

Clint Boling (born May 9, 1989) is an American former professional football player who spent his entire eight-year career as a guard for the Cincinnati Bengals of the National Football League (NFL). He played college football for the Georgia Bulldogs and was selected by the Bengals in the fourth round of the 2011 NFL draft.

== Early life ==
Boling played at Chattahoochee High School in Johns Creek, Georgia, where he was named to The Atlanta Journal-Constitution Class AAAAA First-team Offense. He started as a tight end his sophomore year before moving to offensive line and defensive end his junior and senior years; he led his team to the playoffs his senior season. He also started for the basketball team. In 2006, he was named to the school's Gridiron Hall of Fame.

== College career ==
The Alpharetta native played at the University of Georgia from 2007 to 2010 where he was All-SEC selection three times and a freshman all-American. Boling finished his career with 49 career starts at right tackle, right guard and left tackle. As a senior in 2010, he was named an All-American by Pro Football Weekly. He was named All-SEC First-team by the SEC coaches and second-team by the Associated Press. He was selected to play in the annual Senior Bowl. He majored in Risk Management and Insurance.

== Professional career ==
Pre-draft measurables
Height	Weight	Arm length	Hand span	Wingspan	40-yard dash	10-yard split	20-yard split	20-yard shuttle	Three-cone drill	Vertical jump	Broad jump	Bench press
6 ft 4 5/8 in (1.95 m)	308 lb (140 kg)	33 1/2 in (0.85 m)	9 1/4 in (0.23 m)	6 ft 8 in (2.03 m)	5.30 s	1.84 s	3.06 s	4.64 s	7.66 s	31.0 in (0.79 m)	8 ft 6 in (2.59 m)	28 reps
All values from NFL Combine

Boling was selected by the Cincinnati Bengals in the fourth round with the 101st overall pick in the 2011 NFL draft. He played in five games with three starts his rookie year before earning the starting job the following season.

Boling signed a 5-year, $26 million contract extension with the Bengals on March 10, 2015.

Boling was placed on injured reserve on December 26, 2016, after dealing with a separated shoulder since Week 4.

Since his second year as a pro in 2012, Boling has started every game he's played in for the Bengals, 106 consecutive games through the 2018 season.

On July 15, 2019, Boling announced his retirement from the NFL after eight seasons. He was the team's starting left guard from 2012-2018 and appeared in 114 career games (including playoffs) with 112 starts.

== Personal life ==
Boling is the son of Jay and Debbie Boling. He married his wife, Kelly (Lewis), in 2015. They met at the University of Georgia.
