= List of short-form programs formerly distributed by American Public Television =

The following is a list of short-form programs formerly distributed to public television stations (including PBS affiliates) through American Public Television. There is a separate list for current, upcoming and unreleased programming.

== Short-form series ==
Title	Premiere date	End date	Supplier(s)	Note(s)	Source(s)
The Works of Robert Frost	September 1, 1991	August 31, 2006	New Hampshire Public Television		
Green Means	April 10, 1993	March 31, 2003	KQED		
Sister Wendy Package	January 1, 1996	December 31, 2001			
Food for Thought with Burt Wolf	February 1, 1998	December 31, 2008	Acorn Associates / WKNO		
Classic Images	February 1, 1998	February 6, 2001			
Nounou Time	June 21, 1998	May 31, 2001	Hollywood Ventures Corporation / APT		
Cory's Learning Corner	July 1, 1998	June 30, 2001	Funny Productions; Corlin Productions LLC. WYES		
Cartoons for Children's Rights	September 1, 1998	August 31, 2008	APS		
Irish Filler Package	February 1, 1999	December 31, 2002			
The World's Worst Predictions	April 1, 1999	March 31, 2001			
Artists' World Sketches	May 1, 1999	April 30, 2001	WPBS		
Meetings with Remarkable Trees	April 1, 2000	April 30, 2003	BBC Worldwide Ltd / APT		
A Page from Health Diary	March 1, 2000	February 28, 2002	TPT		
Read It!	May 7, 2000	April 3, 2008	WNEO / WEAO		
I Eat Weeds & Trees	May 14, 2000	May 13, 2008	WDAM-TV / Mississippi ETV		
Tampa Bay Orchestra Fillers	June 30, 2000	June 29, 2002	WEDU		
On the Ballykissangel Trail	June 1, 2001	May 31, 2003	BBC Worldwide Ltd / APT	Originally documentary genre	
Computer Animation Collection	September 1, 2001	June 30, 2003	Odyssey Productions / APT		
Sci Fi Filler Package	October 1, 2001	September 30, 2003			
When the Day Breaks	July 1, 2002	June 30, 2004			
Tahra Time!	May 1, 2003	April 30, 2009	Nashville Public Television		
Headzup!	August 31, 2003	August 30, 2004	WTVP		
60 Second Science	January 2, 2005	January 1, 2014	WXXI		
Posh Nosh	August 1, 2005	July 31, 2007	BBC Worldwide Americas / APT		
MHz Worldview	October 19, 2005	October 18, 2007	WNVT		
What's in a Doctor's Bag?	April 2, 2006	April 1, 2008	Neil Shulman & Associates, Inc. / Georgia Public Broadcasting		
The Toy Castle: Time to Dance	April 3, 2006	April 2, 2011	Sound Venture International / Detroit Public Television		
Sports Tips	September 1, 2006	August 31, 2016	WFWA		
Quadricentennial Minutes	October 1, 2006	September 30, 2016	WCVE-TV		
Antiques Roadshow Fillers	March 1, 2007	February 28, 2009	BBC Worldwide Americas / APT		
Doctor Who Confidential	March 1, 2007	March 31, 2010	BBC Worldwide Americas / APT	Series 9 and 10 only	
African-American Trailblazers	February 1, 2008	January 31, 2017	WCVE-TV		
Are You Ready for DTV?	June 1, 2008	May 31, 2011	KNPB		
WGBH Lab: Open Call Shorts	November 2, 2008	November 1, 2010	Boston Media Productions / WGBH Boston		
Poetry Everywhere	April 1, 2009	March 31, 2016	WGBH-TV		
The OrganWise Guys	August 2, 2009	August 1, 2018	APT		
Pocoyo	January 4, 2010	January 3, 2018	APT	Pocoyo was planned to be distributed by Executive Program Services in 2008. Distributed by PBS Kids 24/7 from 2018 to 2021	
Doc Martin Filler: Roll-In Package	December 1, 2011	November 30, 2013	KCET		
SkyWeek	April 1, 2012	April 5, 2014	New Hampshire Public Television		
Rick Steves: A Symphonic Journey Filler Package	October 6, 2013	March 31, 2025	OPB		
Doc Martin Filler Package	February 1, 2014	December 31, 2017	Acorn Media Group / RLJ Entertainment / APT	Series 2, 6 and 7 only	
Doc Martin: Behind the Scenes (pledge breaks)	July 1, 2014	June 30, 2016	Acorn Media Group / RLJ Entertainment / APT		
Flashback	July 3, 2016	July 2, 2018			

== Short-form specials ==
Title	Premiere date	End date	Supplier(s)	Note(s)	Source(s)
Bob Ross: A Special Tribute	January 1, 1995	January 1, 1998	Featherwind Productions / WIPB		

== See also ==
- List of programs formerly distributed by American Public Television
- List of programs broadcast by PBS
- List of programs broadcast by PBS Kids
- List of programs broadcast by Create
