= Johns Creek (Chattahoochee River tributary) =

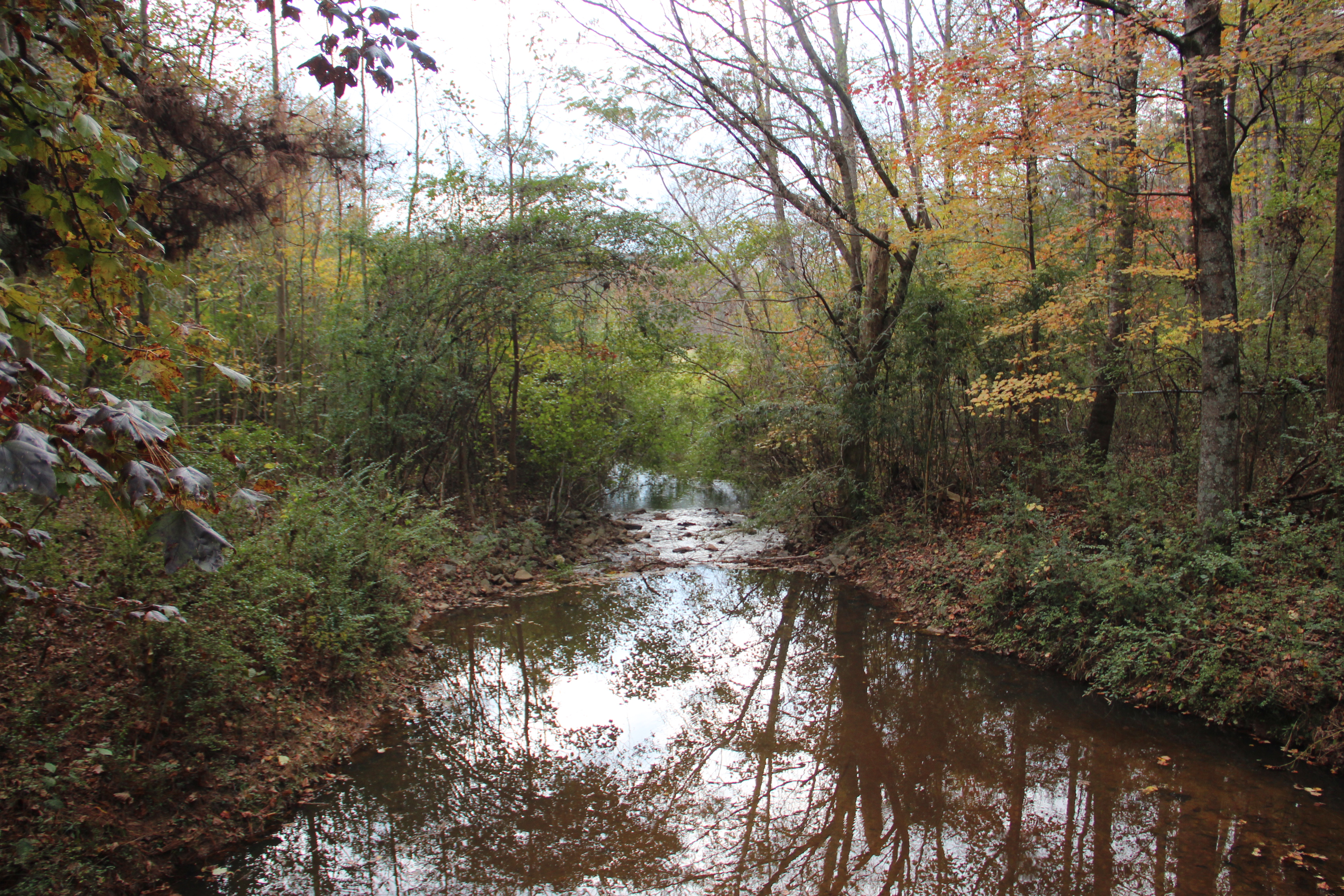
- Johns Creek in Johns Creek

Location
- Country: United States
- State: Georgia
- Counties: Fulton, Forsyth

Physical characteristics
- Source: Vaughn Lake, Forsyth County
  - coordinates: 34°05′14″N 084°10′29″W
- Mouth: Chattahoochee River
  - coordinates: 34°00′17″N 084°13′26″W
- Length: 8.0 mi (12.9 km)

Johns Creek is an 8.0-mile-long (12.9 km) stream which begins in southern Forsyth County, Georgia and runs south-southwestward through the eastern part of northern Fulton County, Georgia (formerly the separate Milton County). It is a tributary of the Chattahoochee River and has no official stream gauges.

The name of Johns Creek, Georgia, incorporated in late 2006, is taken from this creek that runs through the center of the new city.

== Name ==
The creek's name is believed to have originated with John Rogers, one of the earliest white settlers in the area. John Rogers was an ancestor of the noted writer Will Rogers.

== Course ==
Johns Creek originates at Vaughn Lake, a reservoir in southern Forsyth County. From there, the stream flows south through the city of Johns Creek, passing through the Standard Club and under Abbotts Bridge Road. South of State Bridge Road, Johns Creek is joined by Cameron Creek. From there, stream passes through RiverPines Golf before emptying in the Chattahoochee River.

== See also ==
- List of rivers of Georgia (U.S. state)
