= Jack Coco =

American football player (born 1998)

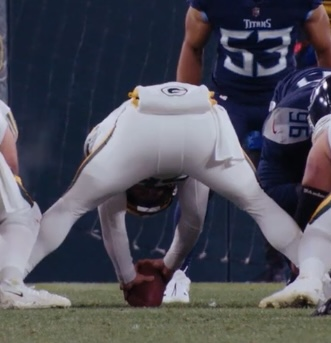
- Coco with the Green Bay Packers in 2022

Profile
- Position: Long snapper

Personal information
- Born: October 9, 1998 (age 28); Johns Creek, Georgia, U.S.
- Listed height: 6 ft 2 in (1.88 m)
- Listed weight: 248 lb (112 kg)

Career information
- High school: Johns Creek (Johns Creek, Georgia)
- College: Georgia Tech (2017–2021)
- NFL draft: 2022: undrafted

Career history
- Green Bay Packers (2022); Arizona Cardinals (2023)*
- * Offseason or practice squad member only

Career NFL statistics as of 2023
- Games played: 17
- Total tackles: 1
- Stats at Pro Football Reference

Jack Coco (born October 9, 1998) is an American professional football long snapper. He played college football for the Georgia Tech Yellow Jackets.

== Early life ==
Coco grew up in Johns Creek, Georgia and attended Johns Creek High School.

== College career ==
Coco joined the Georgia Tech Yellow Jackets as a walk-on and redshirted his true freshman season. He was a reserve offensive lineman as a redshirt freshman and sophomore in addition to serving Georgia Tech's long snapper for the field goal unit. Coco was moved tight end going into his redshirt junior season and lost 30 pounds in the process. He continued to long snap on field goal attempts and also caught four passes for 22 yards in 2020. Coco was awarded a scholarship entering his final season at Georgia Tech. He played solely at tight end as a redshirt senior and had one reception for four yards.

== Professional career ==
Pre-draft measurables
Height	Weight	Arm length	Hand span	40-yard dash	10-yard split	20-yard split	20-yard shuttle	Three-cone drill	Vertical jump	Broad jump	Bench press
6 ft 2 1/8 in (1.88 m)	248 lb (112 kg)	29 1/2 in (0.75 m)	9 in (0.23 m)	4.99 s	1.70 s	2.89 s	4.25 s	7.40 s	29.0 in (0.74 m)	9 ft 5 in (2.87 m)	22 reps
All values from Pro Day

=== Green Bay Packers ===
Coco signed with the Green Bay Packers as an undrafted free agent on May 17, 2022, after participating in a rookie minicamp on a tryout basis. He won the Packers' long snapper job over incumbent Steven Wirtel after Wirtel was released on August 10, 2022. He was released on May 8, 2023.

=== Arizona Cardinals ===
On July 25, 2023, Coco signed with the Arizona Cardinals. He was released on August 4, 2023.
