= Johns Creek High School =

Public high school in Johns Creek, Georgia, United States

- "The Creek"
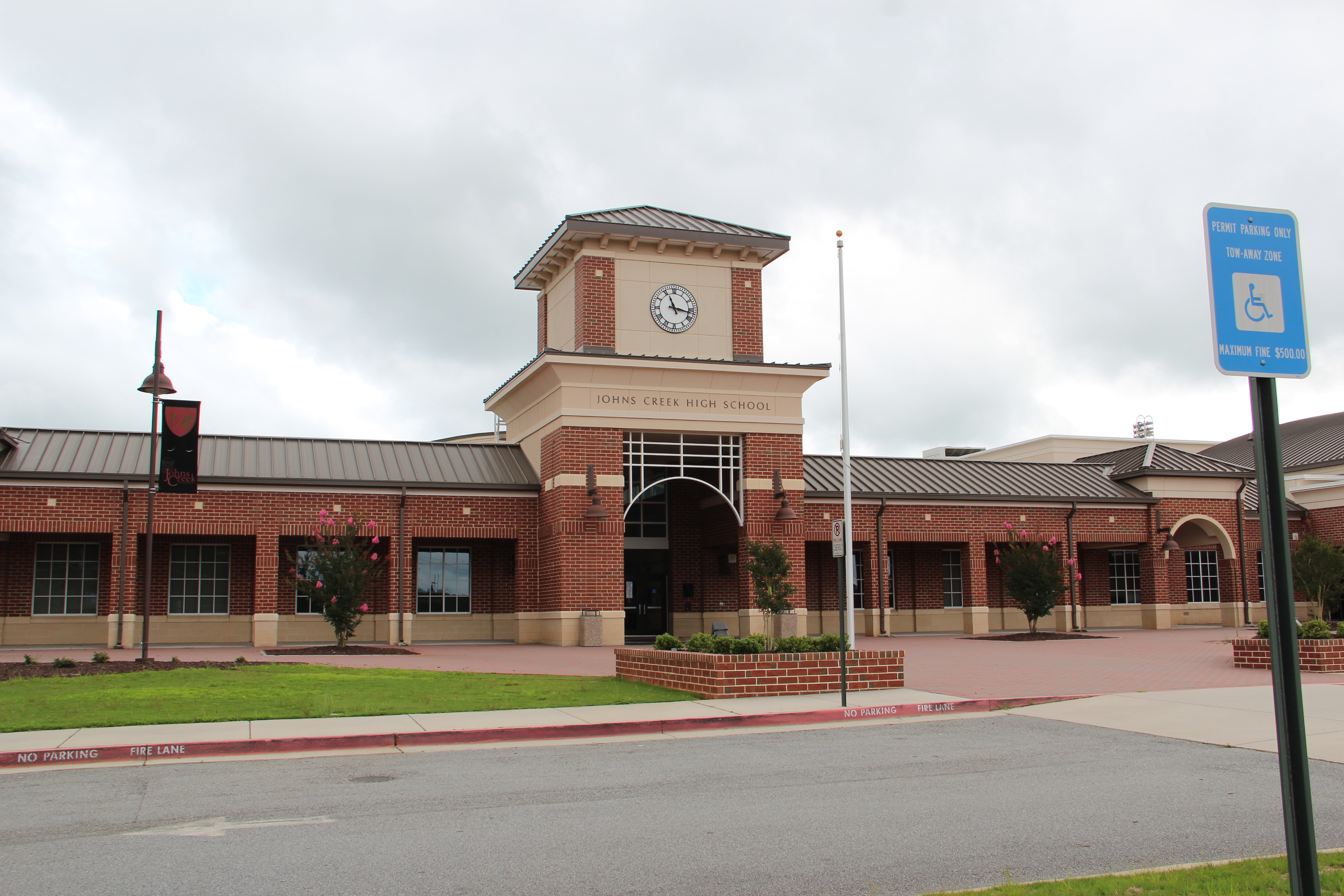
- Johns Creek High School front entrance

Location
- 5575 State Bridge Road; Johns Creek, Fulton County, Georgia; United States; 34°01′22″N 84°11′48″W

Information
- Type: Public high school
- Motto: "Integrity, Service, Excellence"
- Established: August 2008
- CEEB code: 111866
- NCES School ID: 130228003935
- Principal: Chris Shearer
- Teaching staff: 97.70 (FTE)
- Grades: 9–12
- Enrollment: 1,789 (2024–2025)
- Student to teacher ratio: 18.31
- Color: Dark red Gold Black
- Athletics: Football; softball; baseball; cross country; basketball; soccer; lacrosse; track and field; girls flag football; swim; golf
- Mascot: Gladiators
- Nickname: JC, The Creek
- Rival: Chattahoochee High School; Northview High School; Centennial High School
- National ranking: 214
- Newspaper: The Chariot
- Yearbook: Vantage Point
- Website: Johns Creek High School

Johns Creek High School is a public high school in Johns Creek, Georgia, United States, serving grades 9–12. The school is a part of the Fulton County School System. Its students primarily reside inside the city of Johns Creek, though the school also serves part of Alpharetta. Students from Autrey Mill Middle School attend Johns Creek. The school was opened in the fall of 2009 and as of 2017 has an enrollment around 2,076.

In 2013, Johns Creek was ranked by Newsweek as one of America's best public high schools, #214 in the nation, #5 in the State of Georgia and #2 in Fulton County.

As of 2019, Johns Creek High School has 2,142 students enrolled, 44 percent of which are minority students. The student-to-teacher ratio is 20:1. It is ranked 397th nationally, 15th in the state of Georgia, and 5th in Fulton County. Johns Creek boasts a high 97 percent graduation rate.

The school's mascot is the Gladiator.

== Athletics ==
In 2012 Johns Creek came in first place in Region 7AAAA and second in the state in the prestigious Regions Director's Cup, which measures success over all sports. In the 2012 Director's Cup, the JCHS Girls finished in first place in all programs in AAAA.

Johns Creek is in Region 6 in Class AAAAAA with geographic rivals Chattahoochee High School, located 2.5 miles away, and Lambert High School, located in nearby Forsyth County. Johns Creek and Chattahoochee share a particularly intense rivalry. Many of Johns Creek's students would be attending Chattahoochee if JCHS had never been built. Many of the athletes were a part of the Chattahoochee "Joe Volpe" feeder programs and played on the same youth sports teams prior to the existence of Johns Creek.

The 2009 cheerleading squad won the AAA State Championship, making JCHS one of the fastest schools to win a state championship in state history. The 2010 boys' tennis team followed, also claiming the AAA State Championship. In the 2011/2012 school year Johns Creek won state championships in both boys' and girls' tennis and were Region Champions or Region Runners-up in baseball, track (boys' and girls'), football, volleyball, swimming, cheerleading, golf (boys') and cross country (girls'). In the spring of 2012, five Johns Creek teams won the region championship and both the boys' and girls' tennis teams won the AAAA State Championship.

In 2010 the Johns Creek Volleyball team made the AAAA Final Four before losing to eventual state champion, Pope High School. In 2011 the Johns Creek boys' golf team placed 2nd in the state.

Johns Creek's athletic teams include:

- Baseball (2012 Region 7-AAAA Champions, 2013 Region-6 AAAAAA Champions)
- Basketball
- Cheerleading (2015 Co-ed State Champions, 2015 Co-ed Sectional Champions and undefeated season, 2009 Region 5-AAA and AAA State Champions, 2010 Region 7-AAAA Runner-Up, 2011 Region 7-AAAA Runner-Up, and AAAA State Runner-Up)
- Cross-Country (2009 Girls Region 5-AAA Runner Up, 2011 Girls Region 7-AAAA Champions)
- Football (2011 Region 7-AAAA Runner-Up; 17 wins and 3 losses in 2011–2012 seasons; Region 7-AAAAAA champions 2016, 2018, 2019; 18 wins and 2 losses in 2018–2019 seasons; First ever playoff win in 2019 season.)
- Golf (2011 Boys Region 7-AAAA Champions and AAAA State Runner-Up, 2012 Boys Region 7-AAAAA Champions, 2013 Boys Region 7-AAAAAA Champions, 2014 Boys Region 7-AAAAAA Champions and State Runner Up, 2016 Region 7-AAAAAA and State Champions)
- Gymnastics
- Lacrosse (2011 Girls 3-A-AAAA Runner-Up, 2012 Girls 3-A-AAAA Runner-Up)
- Roller Hockey (2011 AA State Champions, 2012 AAA State Champions, 2014 A State Champions)
- Soccer (2017 Girls Region 7-AAAAAA champions, Region 7-AAAAAA State Runner up)
- Softball
- Swim/Dive (2014 Girls AAAAAA State Runner-up; 2011, 2012, 2013, 2014, 2015 Girls Fulton County Champions; 2016, 2017, 2018, 2019, 2020 Combined Fulton County Champions; 2019, 2021, 2022, 2023 AAAAAA Boys State Champions; 2020 AAAAAA Boys State Runner-up (third place)).
- Tennis (2010 Boys Region 5-AAA and AAA State Champions, 2011 Boys Region 7-AAAA Champions, 2012 Boys Region 7-AAAA Champions and AAAA State Champions, 2012 Girls Region 7-AAAA Champions and AAAA State Champions)
- Track (2011 Girls Region 7-AAAA Champions, 2012 Girls Region 7-AAAA Runner-Up, 2012 Boys 7-AAAA Region Champions, Boys 2013 Boys 6-AAAAAA Region Champions)
- Volleyball (2010 AAAA Final Four, 2011 Area 6-AAAA Runner-Up, 2011, 2012, 2013, and 2014 AAAAAA Final Four, 2014 Area 6-AAAAAA Champions)
- Wrestling
- Quiz bowl (national contender yearly)

== Notable alumni ==
- Allie Buchalski (class of 2014), professional distance runner
- Jack Coco (class of 2017), American football long snapper and college football player for the Georgia Tech Yellow Jackets
- Zach Gibson (class of 2019), American football quarterback and college football player for the Florida Atlantic Owls
- Lexi Minetree (class of 2019), Actress, known for her role in Elle

== Sources ==
- Demographics Summary (PDF)
- ajc.com
