= Centennial High School (Georgia) =

School in Roswell, Fulton County, Georgia, United States

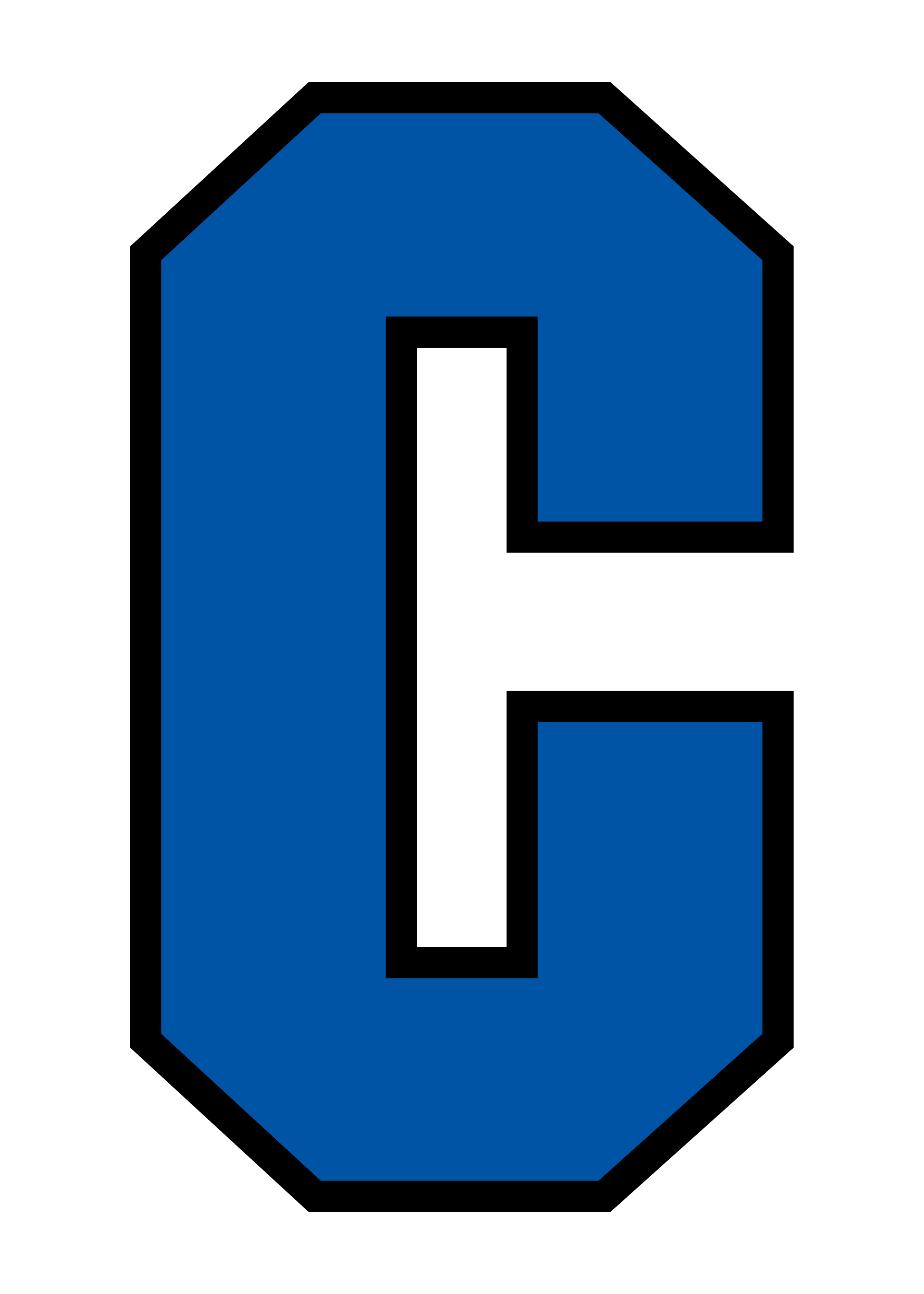

Location
- 9310 Scott Road; Roswell, (Fulton County), Georgia 30076; United States; 34°00′21″N 84°17′19″W

Information
- Type: Public
- Motto: "Collaborate. Think. Learn. Create."
- Opened: 1997
- Sister school: Roswell High School
- CEEB code: 119250
- NCES School ID: 130228002181
- Principal: Dr. Opie Blackwell
- Faculty: 186
- Enrollment: 1,593 (2024–25)
- Language: English
- Schedule type: Period
- Schedule: 6 periods
- Hours in school day: 7hr 10m
- Campus type: Suburban
- Colors: Blue and black
- Slogan: "Our best days are ahead! Go Knights!"
- Mascot: Knight
- Rivals: Roswell High School, Johns Creek High School, Milton High School, Chattahoochee High School, Alpharetta High School, West Forsyth High School, South Forsyth High School, Lambert High School
- Publication: The Avalon
- Newspaper: The Accolade
- Feeder schools: Holcomb Bridge Middle School, Haynes Bridge Middle School
- Website: https://centennial.fultonschools.org/

Centennial High School (also called Cen10, or CHS) is a public high school located in Roswell, Georgia, United States. It opened in 1997. The school was named in honor of the 1996 Olympic games held in Atlanta a year before the school's opening, which marked the centennial anniversary of the modern games.

The school's mascot is the Knight.

== Students, faculty, and campus ==
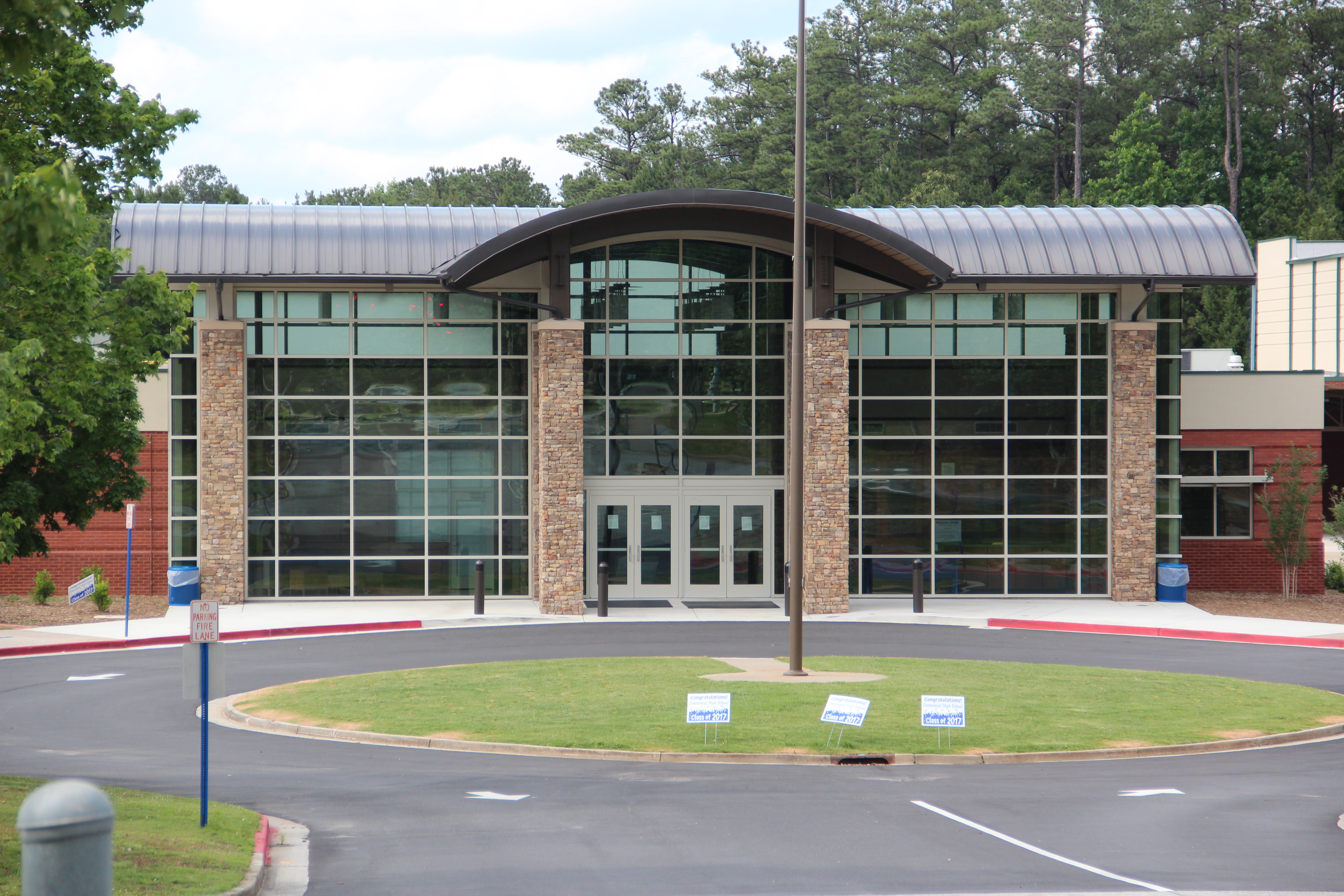
Centennial High School's front entrance, after 2016 renovations

Centennial High School is housed in a 271,200-square-foot (25,200 m^{2}) educational facility sitting on 55 acres (220,000 m^{2}) within the city limits of Roswell. Over the summer of 2016, the school was renovated. The renovations include a new front entrance, new cafeteria lines, new HVAC units and upgrades to the auditorium. The renovations were funded by Fulton County SPLOST (Special Purpose Local Option Sales Tax) funds.

Centennial High School is one of two schools in Roswell, the other being Roswell High School.

Centennial has an award-winning media center, called the Learning Commons, managed by Dr. Christa Evans Heath. The facility has been selected as the model for all Fulton County schools to emulate.

Centennial High School enrolls approximately 1,593 students and has a staff of 186. Parents help support the school's educational program through the Parent-Teacher-Student Association, Booster Club, and the Foundation of the Fine Arts.

Dr. Opie Blackwell became principal in 2023. Previous principals include Keynun Campbell and Dr. Anthony Newbold.

=== Demographics ===
As of 2025, Centennial is 38.4% White, 19.1% African American, 34.7% Hispanic, 3.8% Asian, and 3.7% Multi-Racial.

== Academics ==
Centennial High School offers five types of diplomas - College Preparatory, College Preparatory with Distinction, Career Technology, Career Technology with Distinction and Dual Seal. Centennial offers an Advanced Placement program, which has an 87% passing rate, and honors level courses. The school is also an IB school, meaning it offers the International Baccalaureate program under Dr. Von Biberstein. Making it one of only 4 schools in Fulton to offer it. Also offered are on-campus joint enrollment courses and an off-campus post secondary options program. Career technology programs include electronic media production, health science, criminal justice, diversified technology, and EXCEL.

Centennial's literary arts magazine, Avalon, is an entirely student-run publication which publishes written and visual works submitted by Centennial students. It was first published in 1998, and was published bi-annually until 2001, when it began to be published annually. Avalon is a nationally recognized magazine, frequently receiving awards from the Columbia Scholastic Press Association. Writer Liam Connolly was an editor during the 2003–2004 year. The 2004–2005 issue received a Silver Crown award, and was the only literary magazine in Georgia to do so. The 2005–2006 issue received a Bronze Crown Award.

== Extracurricular activities ==
As of the fall of 2007, Centennial had teamed up with Score Atlanta and Turner Broadcasting to begin showing live broadcasts of the school's home sports games. This was the first program ever to do this with high school students.

=== Model United Nations ===
Centennial's 2008 Model United Nations delegations of Albania and Venezuela placed first and third out of over 200 delegations in the National High School Model United Nations competition, with Albania coming in first, and Venezuela third respectively. In March 2009, Centennial competed again in the national competition, representing France, and repeated in first place out of over 250 schools.

In 2011, Centennial returned to the top ten, placing eighth in the nation. According to Best Delegate, "Centennial placed a distant third behind Port Charlotte High School and Gulf Coast High School at their hometown Georgia Tech GTMUN conference to begin the Fall, but the team roared back at Nationals NHSMUN to win Outstanding Large Delegation. We valued this win at one of the most competitive conferences in the nation much more than their early-season head-to-head placing at the smaller, regional GTMUN in determining where they would place in the standings — at the end of the season, Centennial won one of the top team awards in the circuit. On a side note, GTMUN Secretary-General Kelsie Riemenschneider is among its alumni in the college ranks."

Also in 2011, Centennial's Model UN team hosted its first Model UN Conference, called MiniMUN, for area middle school students. MiniMUN continues to expand and bring in middle school students from all over Georgia. The conference is entirely student-run.

In 2012, Centennial ranked ninth in the nation, according to Best Delegate: "Centennial continues to be one of the strongest teams from the Southeast. The team won Best Delegation at the Southern United States SUSMUN conference and placed third at an increasingly competitive Georgia Tech GTMUN. The team primarily participates at in-state conferences but teams around the country will recognize them when they travel to participate at Nationals NHSMUN (Centennial won a delegation award there last year)."

As of May 29, 2013, Best Delegate ranked Centennial's Model UN team number six in the nation. During the 2012–2013 school year, Centennial won the Award of Distinction at the National Model United Nations, the Best Small Delegation Award at the HMUN, the Award of Distinction at Southern States Model United Nations, and won more delegation awards at UGAMUN and Georgia Tech GTMUN.

In 2014 Centennial received both the Award of Excellence and the Research and Preparation Award of Excellence at NHSMUN. This was followed in 2015 and 2016 with the Award of Merit at the same conference.

In 2016–2017, the team competed at GTMUN, Vanderbilt's Model United Nations Conference XIII, Model Arab League, and UGAMUNC receiving several awards, including Best Position Paper, Honorable Mention and Outstanding Delegation awards for individual and overall delegations.

In the 2015–2016 school year, Centennial added a class in International Affairs designed to cultivate young delegates through mentorship and instruction by senior members of the team.

According Best Delegate's 2015–2016 high school rankings, Centennial MUN team ranks top 150 teams in the nation.

Centennial is advised by the Social Studies Department Chair Mack Hennessey.

=== Athletics ===
The 2002 Knights football team went 10–0, marking the only undefeated regular season in Centennial's history. The region 6-AAAAA champion The Knights lost in the second round of the state playoffs to eventual state champion Parkview High School.

Centennial's feeder schools, Haynes and Holcomb Bridge Middle Schools respectively, have their students come together for a junior knights football team, split by grade. This is used as a way to prepare any athletes planning on joining the high school team. In 2024, the 7th grade team led by Coach Von won the championship.

Centennial's first team state championship was won by the 2006 girls' varsity swim team.

Centennials boys swim team holds the GHSA state record for the 200 medley of 1:31.71, swam by Aidan Saunders, Justin Bender, Sebastien Sergile and Caleb Paek in 2022

Both Centennial's boys' and girls' varsity cross country teams qualified for the state meet eight years in a row, from 2007 to 2013. The team also sponsors the annual Firstgiving Sam Robb Memorial 5k and Fun Run which raises money for the Cure Childhood Cancer fund and honors former Centennial student Sam Robb.

== Notable alumni ==
- Everett Teaford (born 1984), former professional baseball player, current college coach for the Auburn Tigers
- Sarah Gibson (1986-2024), composer and concert pianist
- Mike Macdonald (born 1987), current Super Bowl LX-winning Seattle Seahawks head coach
- Maria Taylor (born 1987), former ESPN and current NBC Sports reporter
- Lorenzo Brown (born 1990), professional basketball player, formerly in the NBA, now in the Israeli Basketball Premier League
- Junior Sandoval (born 1990), soccer player for the NASL Atlanta Silverbacks
- Brendan Moore (born 1992), former goalkeeper for Atlanta United FC
- David Yankey (born 1992), former NFL guard, college football player for the Stanford Cardinal, drafted by the Minnesota Vikings in the 2014 NFL draft in the 5th round
- Grant Decouto (born 1995), music producer and rapper
- Kaliii (born 2000), rapper
- Max Brosmer (born 2001), current Minnesota Vikings quarterback
