= Alice Harrell Strickland =

American politician

- Born: Alice Harrell; June 24, 1859; Forsyth County, Georgia
- Died: September 8, 1947 (aged 88)
- Known for: First woman mayor in state of Georgia
- Spouse(s): Henry Lenoir Strickland, Jr. (1881–1915)
- Children: 7

Alice Harrell Strickland (June 24, 1859 – September 8, 1947) was an American politician and activist from Duluth, Georgia. Strickland was the first woman to be elected mayor in the U.S. state of Georgia. She was also known for philanthropic work including establishing the first community forest in Georgia. In 2002 she was posthumously named a Georgia Woman of Achievement.

== Early life and family ==
Alice Harrell was born June 24, 1859, in Forsyth County, Georgia, the daughter of Newton Harrell and Mary Ellender (Harris) Harrell. She married Henry Lenoir Strickland, Jr. (a lawyer and businessman) in Forsyth, Georgia, on November 10, 1881 when she was 22.

The married couple moved into Strickland's home in Duluth, Georgia. Mrs. Strickland became active in the Duluth Civic Club and Duluth Methodist Church. The couple would have seven children, all of whom attended college and inherited "their mother's pioneering spirit and courage." They built a new home on three acres of land in 1898, and it was designed by Mrs. Strickland. Her husband died at age 55 in 1915, leaving her with two children still at home.

== Activities ==
Strickland remained active after this. As president of the Duluth Civic Club, she volunteered an entire floor of her home to be used for sick children at a time when Duluth had no hospitals of its own. She also donated a portion of her land to Duluth to become the first community conservation forest in Georgia.

Strickland was a "suffragist from childhood." In 1919 she was among many women who lobbied the Georgia General Assembly (unsuccessfully) in favor of the state's passage of what was then called the "Susan B. Anthony Amendment" in favor of women's suffrage.

== Political career ==
Just a year after that amendment was finally enacted as the Nineteenth Amendment to the United States Constitution in 1920, Strickland ran for mayor of Duluth. She was elected in 1921 at age 62, becoming the first woman elected mayor in Georgia. Duluth at that time had a reputation for drunkenness and violence, and Strickland ran on a pledge to "clean up Duluth and rid it of demon rum". In office, she was "considerate to petty offenders, but severe with those who willingly and flagrantly disregarded the rights of others". She was re-elected in 1922.

When Georgia Power planned to run an electric line across her property against her will. She held a shotgun as she blocked the workers from entering. Strickland lived in her same home until she died on September 8, 1947. She was buried in Duluth.

== Legacy ==
Strickland was named to the Georgia Women of Achievement hall of fame in 2002.

Strickland's Victorian home still exists at 2956 Buford Highway in Duluth. It was among the first sites for the Georgia Historical Society's new historical marker program in 1998, when the house turned 100 years old. It was listed on the Georgia Register of Historic Places in 1999. Since at least 1977, some locals have claimed that the house is haunted by Strickland's ghost.

In 2008 the Duluth Historical Society attempted to raise funds to purchase the house, which had come up for sale, intending to use it as a museum. The purchase effort did not succeed, but they were able to lease the house as a site to replace the previous historical museum, whose building had been razed. In late 2014 the society moved to the Duluth Train Depot, another historic building.
