= Duluth, Georgia =

- City
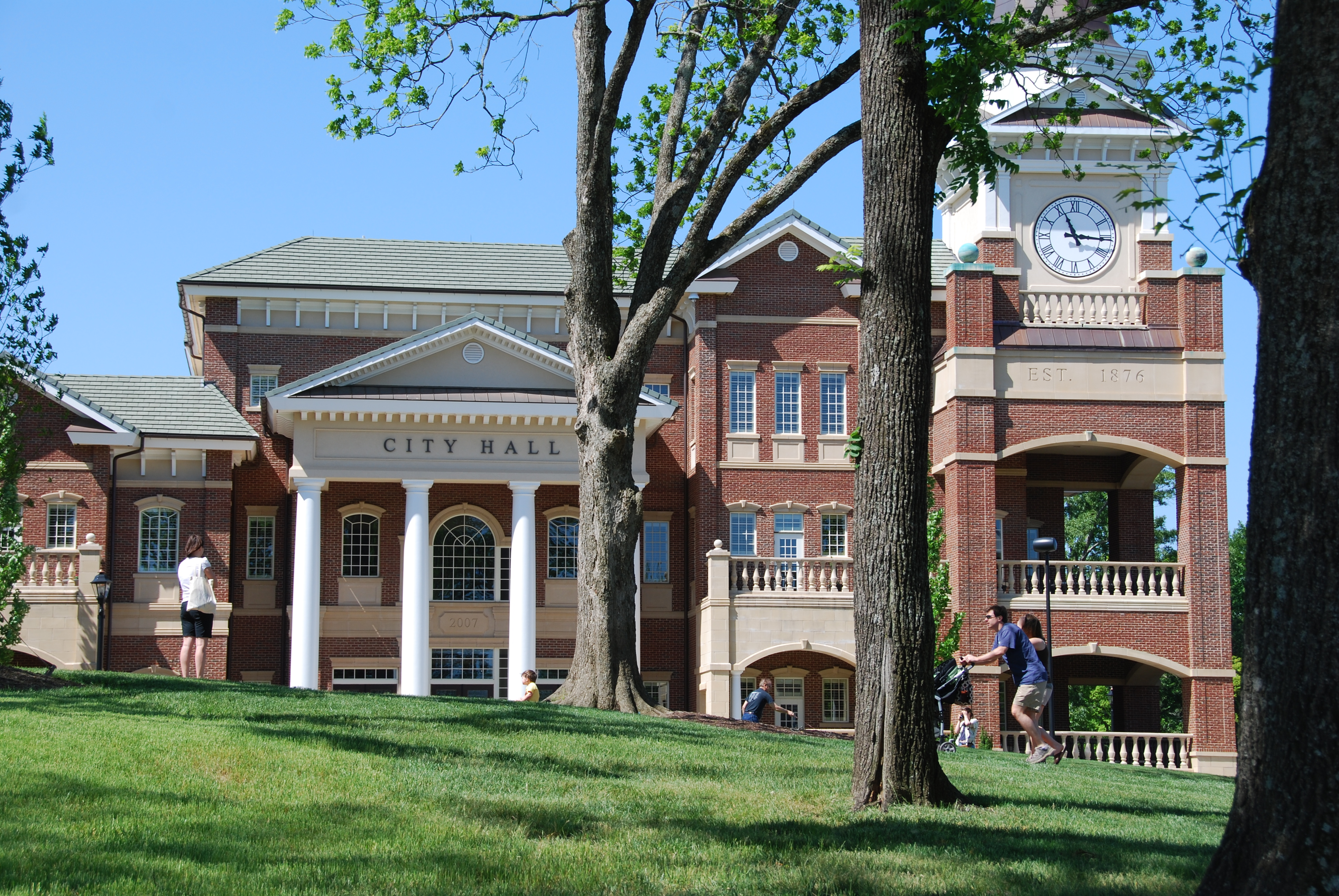
- City Hall

- Flag Seal Logo
- Motto: "Pride in Old and New"
- Interactive map of Duluth, Georgia
- Coordinates: 34°0′19″N 84°8′57″W
- Country: United States
- State: Georgia
- County: Gwinnett

Government
  - Type: Council–manager
  - Mayor: Greg Whitlock

Area
  - Total: 10.38 sq mi (26.89 km^{2})
  - Land: 10.22 sq mi (26.47 km^{2})
  - Water: 0.16 sq mi (0.42 km^{2})
- Elevation: 1,060 ft (320 m)

Population (2020)
  - Total: 31,873
  - Density: 3,118.6/sq mi (1,204.08/km^{2})
- Time zone: UTC-5 (Eastern (EST))
  - Summer (DST): UTC-4 (EDT)
- ZIP codes: 30026, 30029, 30095-30099
- Area code: 470/678/770/404
- FIPS code: 13-24600
- GNIS feature ID: 2403514
- Website: www.duluthga.net

Duluth (/dəˈluːθ/ də-LOOTH) is a city in Gwinnett County, Georgia, United States. Located north of Interstate 85, it is approximately 30 miles (48 km) northeast of Atlanta.

As of the 2020 census, Duluth had a population of 31,873, and the United States Census Bureau estimated the population to be 31,864 as of 2021.

This Atlanta suburb is home to Gwinnett Place Mall, the Gwinnett Civic and Cultural Center, Gas South Arena, Hudgens Center for the Arts, and the Red Clay Theater. It is also home to Northside Hospital–Duluth, an 81-bed hospital constructed in 2006, as well as GMC's Glancy Campus, a 30-bed facility located near downtown. The agricultural manufacturer AGCO is based in Duluth.

== History ==
Duluth was originally Cherokee territory. When Duluth was established in the early 19th century, it was primarily forested land occupied by tribespeople. An Indian trail, called Old Peachtree Road by the settlers, was extended through the area during the War of 1812 to connect Fort Peachtree in present-day Atlanta with Fort Daniel near present-day Dacula. When Gwinnett County was established in 1818, white settlement of the area accelerated.

Cotton merchant Evan Howell constructed a road connecting his cotton gin at the Chattahoochee River with Old Peachtree Road, creating Howell's Cross Roads. The settlement later became known as "Howell's Crossing". Howell was the grandfather of Atlanta Mayor Evan P. Howell and great-grandfather of Atlanta Constitution publisher Clark Howell.

=== Railroad era and new name ===
Howell's Crossing was renamed "Duluth" in 1871 after Congress funded a north–south railroad line into the community. It was named after the city of Duluth, Minnesota. The Midwestern city had gotten its own railroad connection not long before, which had prompted Rep. J. Proctor Knott, a Kentucky Democrat, to make a speech in Congress mocking the project as wasteful. That speech drew national attention. According to contemporary reports, Evan P. Howell himself jokingly suggested the name change in a speech about the arrival of railroad service in the Georgia town. (Duluth, Minnesota, is named for Daniel Greysolon, Sieur du Lhut (1636–1710), a French captain and explorer of the upper Midwest, who negotiated peace between the Chippewa and the Sioux nation.)

The railroad encouraged the growth of Duluth's economy. A schoolhouse was built in 1871 on the site of what is now Coleman Middle School (formerly Duluth Middle School and Duluth Elementary School). The first Methodist church was organized in 1871, and the first Baptist congregation formed in 1886. Both churches continue today at new locations along State Route 120. The Bank of Duluth was charted in 1904, followed by the Farmers and Merchants Bank in 1911. Neither survived the Great Depression.

In 1922, Duluth elected Georgia's first female mayor, Alice Harrell Strickland. She donated 1-acre (4,000 m^{2}) of land for a "community forest" and began efforts to conserve land for public recreation.

=== Post-war and modern era ===
Duluth grew rapidly in the 1970s and 1980s, along with the rest of Gwinnett County. Georgia Governor George Busbee became a resident of Duluth in 1983 after leaving office, moving to the Sweet Bottom Plantation subdivision developed by Scott Hudgens. A major revitalization of the Duluth downtown area was undertaken in the early 21st century. Development along Sugarloaf Parkway has continued with the construction of the Gwinnett Arena near the Gwinnett Convention Center.

In much of the 20th century, when Gwinnett County was still rural, Duluth was known in the area as being one of the few small towns with its own hospital, Joan Glancy Memorial Hospital. Consequently, many older residents of the area who call other towns home were actually born in Duluth. Joan Glancy was replaced with Gwinnett Medical Center – Duluth in 2006. The site of the old Joan Glancy hospital is now GMC's Glancy Campus, home to the Glancy Rehabilitation Center, the Duluth location of GMC's Diabetes & Nutrition Education Center and the Duluth location of GMC's Center for Sleep Disorder.

The city made national headlines twice in 2005. In March, Fulton County Courthouse shooting suspect Brian Nichols was captured in a Duluth apartment after holding a woman hostage. In April, local resident Jennifer Wilbanks was reported missing a few days before her planned wedding to John Mason. She was found a few days later in Albuquerque, New Mexico, where she admitted to having lied about being kidnapped.

== Geography ==
Duluth is located in the northeastern section of the Atlanta metropolitan area. Approximately 25 mi (40 km) from Downtown Atlanta, the city lies in the west-central section of Gwinnett County, bounded to the north by the Chattahoochee River (which also acts as the county line), northeast by Suwanee, south by unincorporated land, and west by Berkeley Lake. Sometimes, though, the area in Fulton County that is very near the city is considered Duluth as well.

Unincorporated portions of Forsyth County use a Duluth ZIP code despite being outside Duluth city limits in a different county. A significant part of the nearby city of Johns Creek in Fulton County shares at least one ZIP code with Duluth.

Duluth has a humid subtropical climate (Cfa.) The monthly averages range from 41.0 °F in January to 78.3° in July. The local hardiness zone is 7b.

== Demographics ==
Historical population
Census	Pop.	Note	%±
1880	242		—
1890	319		31.8%
1900	336		5.3%
1910	469		39.6%
1920	600		27.9%
1930	608		1.3%
1940	626		3.0%
1950	842		34.5%
1960	1,483		76.1%
1970	1,810		22.0%
1980	2,956		63.3%
1990	9,029		205.4%
2000	22,122		145.0%
2010	26,600		20.2%
2020	31,873		19.8%
2025 (est.)	33,815	▲	6.1%
U.S. Decennial Census; 2025

=== 2020 census ===
As of the 2020 census, Duluth had a population of 31,873. The median age was 37.4 years. 21.6% of residents were under the age of 18 and 11.9% of residents were 65 years of age or older. For every 100 females there were 90.7 males, and for every 100 females age 18 and over there were 87.6 males age 18 and over.

100.0% of residents lived in urban areas, while 0.0% lived in rural areas.

There were 12,501 households and 7,634 families in Duluth, of which 32.8% had children under the age of 18 living in them. Of all households, 45.8% were married-couple households, 18.0% were households with a male householder and no spouse or partner present, and 30.4% were households with a female householder and no spouse or partner present. About 26.3% of all households were made up of individuals and 6.9% had someone living alone who was 65 years of age or older.

There were 13,141 housing units, of which 4.9% were vacant. The homeowner vacancy rate was 1.4% and the rental vacancy rate was 6.4%.

Racial composition as of the 2020 census
Race	Number	Percent
White	10,909	34.2%
Black or African American	7,019	22.0%
American Indian and Alaska Native	123	0.4%
Asian	7,944	24.9%
Native Hawaiian and Other Pacific Islander	26	0.1%
Some other race	2,600	8.2%
Two or more races	3,252	10.2%
Hispanic or Latino (of any race)	5,384	16.9%

== Economy ==
=== Businesses ===
- Advanced Armament Corporation
- AGCO
- Asbury Automotive Group
- Barco
- Broadcom
- Ciba Vision
- Datapath, Inc. (formerly Rockwell Collins Satellite Communication Systems, Inc.)
- General Dynamics SATCOM Tech (formerly)
- Given Imaging
- Merial Animal Health
- Nordson
- The OrganWise Guys
- Primerica
- Roper Industries
- Tetra Tech
- ViaSat

=== Tourism ===
The city hosts an annual Fall Festival on the last weekend of every September, which is held in the town center. The Southeastern Railway Museum is located in Duluth, and is Georgia's official transportation museum.

== Sports ==
The Atlanta Gladiators, formerly the Gwinnett Gladiators, of the ECHL, a professional minor league ice hockey team, plays in the Gas South Arena, which opened in 2003 in an unincorporated area of Gwinnett County with a Duluth zip code. The Sugarloaf Country Club golf course hosted the AT&T Classic, a PGA Tour golf tournament from 1997 to 2008. The club currently hosts the Greater Gwinnett Championship, a Champions Tour golf tournament that initiated in 2013.

Duluth is also home of the Georgia Swarm of the National Lacrosse League since 2016 and shares the Gas South Arena with the Gladiators.

== Parks and recreation ==
Citizens have a wide variety of recreational activities to choose from. The city maintains 7 parks as well as the Festival Center. Some of the sports offered are Tennis, Soccer, Ballet, Zumba. Swimming is available only 3.9 miles from city hall at West Gwinnett Aquatic Center. The city parks include:

- Bunten Road Park
- Chattapoochee Dog Park
- Church Street Park
- Rogers Bridge Park
- Scott Hudgens Park
- Taylor Park
- W.P. Jones Park
- Shorty Howell Park

== Government ==
The City of Duluth is governed by a mayor and five city council members, who together appoint the city administrator and city clerk. Elections are held every two years, in the odd-numbered years, and the mayor and council members are elected for staggered four-year terms.

The mayor of Duluth is Greg Whitlock, who was inaugurated in November 2023. Nancy Harris was mayor for 16 years prior to Whitlock, and was also the former principal of B.B. Harris Elementary School and Suwanee Elementary School. Harris Elementary is named for her father, B.B. Harris, also a former principal and Gwinnett County School Superintendent.

The city is represented in the Georgia General Assembly by Senator Adrienne White (D), Representative Ruwa Romman (D), and Representative Matt Reeves (R) who together form the city's state legislative delegation. It is currently represented at the federal level by US Senators Jon Ossoff (D) and Raphael Warnock (D), and US Representative Hank Johnson (D).

== Education ==
Gwinnett County Public Schools operates public schools serving residents of the city.

=== Elementary schools ===
- Berkeley Lake Elementary (Duluth)
- Chattahoochee Elementary (Duluth)
- Chesney Elementary (Duluth)
- Harris Elementary (Duluth)
- Mason Elementary (Peachtree Ridge)
- Parsons Elementary (Peachtree Ridge)

=== Middle schools ===
- Coleman Middle School (Duluth)
- Duluth Middle School (Duluth)
- Hull Middle School (Peachtree Ridge)

=== High schools ===
- Duluth High School (Duluth)
- Peachtree Ridge High School (Peachtree Ridge)

=== Private schools ===
- Atlanta Adventist Academy (Duluth)
- Duluth Junior Academy (Duluth)
- Duluth Montessori School (Duluth)
- Notre Dame Academy (Duluth)

=== Public libraries ===
Gwinnett County Public Library operates the Duluth Branch in Duluth.

== Infrastructure ==
=== Transportation ===
==== Roads and expressways ====
Duluth holds the title of being a railroad city. Trains carrying both passengers and cargo can be seen at all times of the day. In addition, Duluth is a heavily car-dependent suburb. A number of collector roads distribute traffic around both incorporated and unincorporated areas of the city, some of the most important being Buford Highway, Duluth Highway, Sugarloaf Parkway, and Pleasant Hill Road. Apart from Buford Highway, these roads bring traffic to Interstate 85, connecting the Duluth area to central Atlanta about 25 mi (40 km) away.

==== Transit systems ====
Ride Gwinnett serves the city.

Through the 1960s, the Southern Railway ran passenger trains with a stop in Duluth. The local #36 Atlanta - Washington made a flagstop on the northbound trip. The local #35 Salisbury - Atlanta and the Peach Queen (Washington - Atlanta) made stops on their southbound trip.

==== Pedestrians and cycling ====
The Western Gwinnett Bikeway, is a multi-use trail under construction along the Peachtree Industrial Boulevard. It is a shared use path, cycle track, and bike lane used to connect Duluth to neighboring Berkeley Lake, Norcross and Suwanee.

In January 2018 significant plans were approved for the engineering phase to upgrade State Bridge Road and Pleasant Hill Road. There is community-wide support from the community in both neighboring Johns Creek and Duluth for the pedestrian river bridge for the project. It will serve to improve bike-pedestrian safety, boost local economies by improving access to businesses, enhance connections with surrounding neighborhoods and improve traffic flow in the area. In addition, the upgrade will serve to ease the inspection and maintenance of the bridge in the future.

In March 2018, the Gwinnett County Commissioners approved the agreement with the Johns Creek City Council. Both sides have agreed to remove the sidewalks from the existing bridges in order to widen the roads. To improve safety for pedestrians, a new pedestrian bridge will be constructed on one side of the river. A pedestrian underpass linking both sides of the wider road is being considered to further improve access and provide for a safer crossing of the road.

The Rogers bridge project is another significant plan that is to connect to Johns Creek via reconstructing a bike/pedestrian bridge across the Chattahoochee River. The engineers will determine whether to replace or rehabilitate the existing Rogers Bridge over the Chattahoochee River, will take into account the environmental impacts of each option, and will restore the working bike/pedestrian connection between Duluth and Johns Creek. This will allow access to the planned 133-acre parkland under development in Johns Creek and will allow Fulton County residents access to Rogers Bridge Park, the Chattapoochee Dog Park, and the Western Gwinnett Bikeway currently under development by Gwinnett County.

== Notable people ==
- Robby Bostain (born 1984), American-Israeli basketball player
- Stewart Cink, professional golfer
- Chris Duvall, professional soccer player
- Scott Hall, WWE Hall of fame
- Nene Leakes, Reality television personality and actress
- Robert L. Lynn, poet and former president of Louisiana College in Pineville, Louisiana
- Brian McCann, MLB player (Atlanta Braves), grew up in Duluth, graduated from Duluth High School
- MattyB, Viral YouTube musician
- Monica Padman actor, podcaster, TV competition host, and two-time Georgia State High School Cheerleading Champion
- George Rogers, 1980 Heisman Trophy Winner grew up in Duluth, graduated from Duluth High School
- Alice Harrell Strickland, first woman elected mayor in Georgia
- Raven-Symoné, actress
- Jennifer Wilbanks, the "runaway bride"
