= Newtown Elementary School =

United States historic place

- U.S. National Register of Historic Places
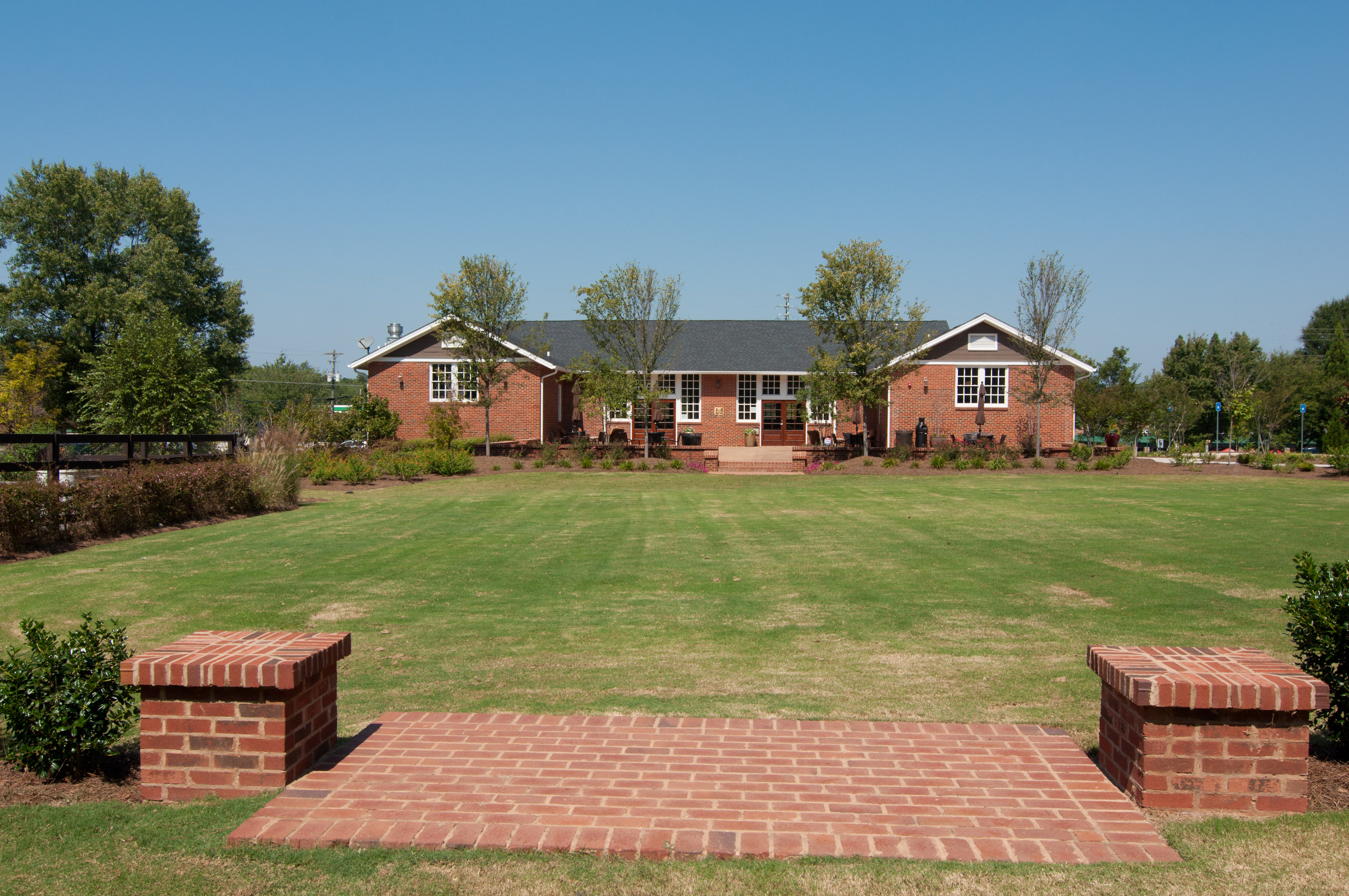
- Newtown Elementary building, in 2012

- Location within Georgia
- Location: 3115 Old Alabama Road, Johns Creek, Georgia
- Coordinates: 34°01′14″N 84°16′08″W
- Area: 3.9 acres (1.6 ha)
- Built: 1929
- NRHP reference No.: 06000739
- Added to NRHP: August 30, 2006

Newtown Elementary School, in what is now Johns Creek, Georgia, was built in 1929. It was listed on the National Register of Historic Places in August 2006.

== History ==
The school was deemed significant as "a good example of an elementary school built with minimal details or embellishments, just a functioning four-room school building with central assembly room," built in a rural area just before the Great Depression. It originally had pot-bellied stoves and outdoor privies.

It replaced four separate one-room schoolhouses in what was then Milton County, Georgia, as the last school built in the county, before Milton was merged in 1931 into Fulton County for financial reasons including the economic effects of the boll weevil. The property includes two contributing buildings besides the school: a storage shed and a community building. Its main building is H-shaped.

It is the sole historic place in Johns Creek which is listed on the National Register of Historic Places. (Note: It being the sole NRHP listing in Johns Creek can be verified by reviewing locations of all National Register of Historic Places listings in Fulton County, Georgia.) It was listed with location being in unincorporated area of Fulton County, near Alpharetta. Later in the listing year of 2006, Johns Creek was officially incorporated as a city.

== See also ==
- National Register of Historic Places listings in Fulton County, Georgia
