= Chattahoochee High School =

School in Johns Creek, Georgia, United States

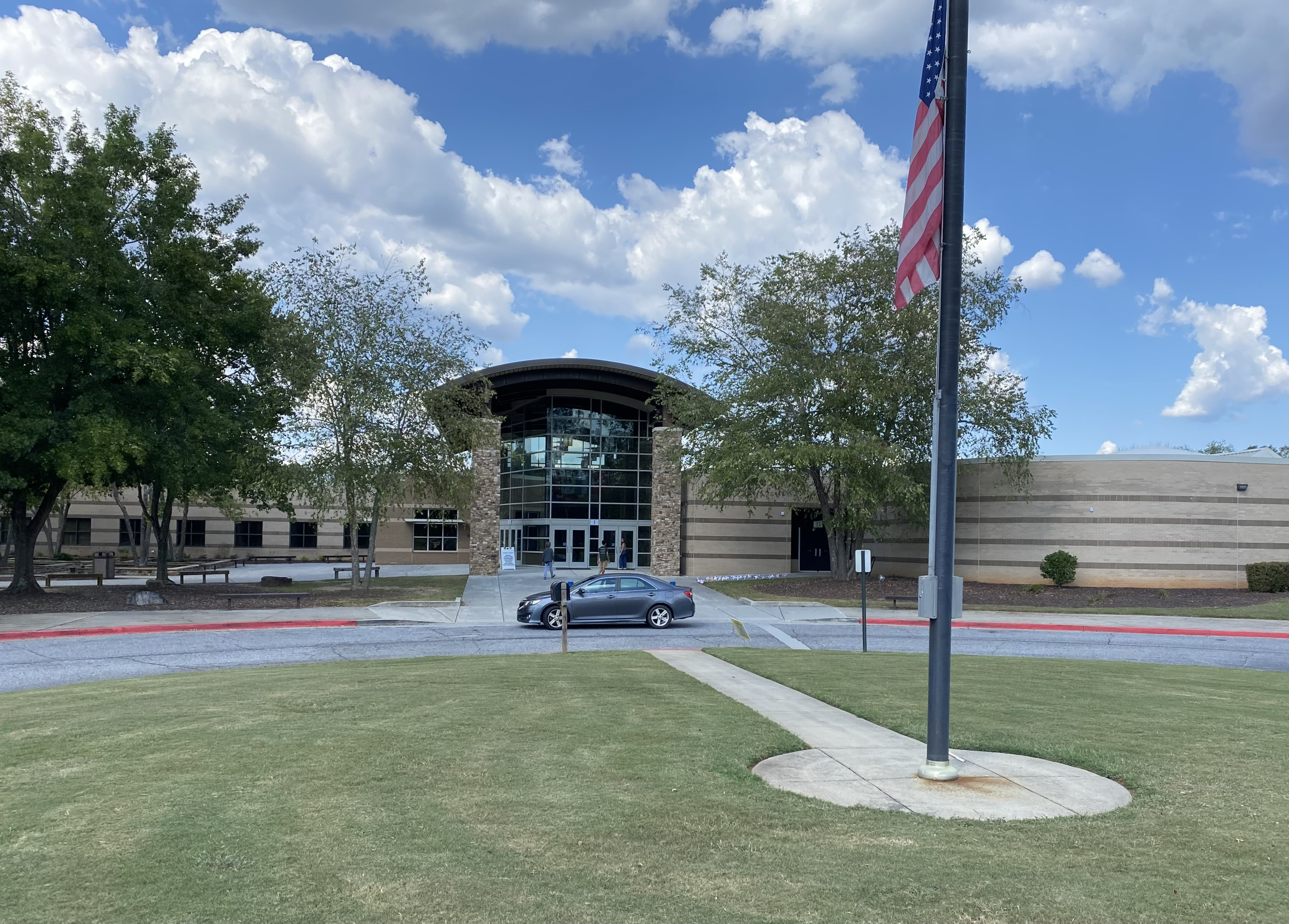
- A photo displaying the front of Chattahoochee High School in Johns Creek, GA

Location
- 5230 Taylor Rd; Johns Creek, (Fulton County), Georgia 30022; United States; 34°02′53″N 84°12′28″W

Information
- School type: Public
- Motto: "Pride, Respect, Integrity."
- Established: 1991
- School district: Fulton County
- NCES District ID: 1302280
- CEEB code: 110146
- NCES School ID: 130228002172
- Principal: Mike Todd
- Teaching staff: 103.30 (FTE)
- Enrollment: 1,781 (2023-2024)
- Student to teacher ratio: 17.24
- Campus type: Suburban
- Color: Royal blue Gold
- Athletics conference: GHSA Class AAAAAA Region 6
- Mascot: Cougar
- Nickname: Hooch
- Team name: Cougars
- Rivals: Johns Creek High School, Northview High School
- USNWR ranking: 327
- Newspaper: The Speculator: Voice and Vision
- Yearbook: Current
- Feeder schools: Taylor Road Middle School
- Website: chattahoochee.fultonschools.org

Chattahoochee High School (CHS; colloquially referred to as "Hooch") is a public high school in Johns Creek, Georgia, United States, within the Fulton County School System. It is located next to its only feeder school, Taylor Road Middle School.

It has been recognized by the U.S. Department of Education as one of America's Blue Ribbon Schools. Chattahoochee was named the 6th Best Public High School in Georgia by Niche. In 2019, it was named a National PTSA School of Excellence and ranked as a top high school in U.S. World & News Report (#282 Nationally, #9 in Georgia). It was given a rating of 10 out of a possible 10 by Great Schools Rating.

== History ==
The High School opened in the 1991–92 school year replacing the now-closed Crestwood High School. 1992 was the first time a cougar appeared, which was the mascot of the school. 1993 saw enrollment rise to 2200 due to the rapidly growing Alpharetta area. The football stadium opened on September 17, 1993. The following year, the school population continued to increase to 2460. The auditorium and CT Halls were built to attempt to keep up with population growth. In 1995, increased enrollment (2600) forced the school to go with a split day, starting freshmen (9 AM) two hours after upperclassmen (7 AM) which would continue for the next two years. Administration added a minute to the bell schedule and parking became a senior only privilege. The population continued to increase, forcing the addition of 14 trailers in 1996 to accommodate the students in a school designed for 1800. The opening of Centennial High School in 1997 reduced student population by 600 students in 1997–98 to 2200. The number of students would continue to fluctuate between 2005 (2004-2005 school year) and 2814 (2001-2002) as the rapidly growing Johns Creek area was fueling student growth and the Fulton County School System was building schools to relieve the overcrowding such as Northview (2002), Alpharetta (2004), and Johns Creek (2009).

The school previously had an Alpharetta address before Johns Creek was incorporated in 2006.

== Athletics ==
Since the 2012–13 school year, Chattahoochee High School has competed in Region 6–AAAAAA. From 2010 to 2012 Chattahoochee was in Region 7–AAAA due to redistricting and a decrease in the school's population after the opening of Johns Creek High School in 2009. However, the school moved back up to the highest classification after statewide reclassification. Chattahoochee was previously a member of Region 7–AAAAA.

Competitive sports at Chattahoochee include baseball, basketball, cheerleading, cross country, football, gymnastics, lacrosse, soccer, golf, tennis, track, volleyball, and wrestling.

=== Baseball ===
- The 2004-05 Cougars won the state championship
- Tim Lemons, Chattahoochee's head varsity baseball coach since the school opened in 1991, was inducted into the GADC Hall of Fame Jan. 13, 2017

=== Soccer ===
Boys' Soccer Region Champions: 2015-2017 Boys' Soccer State Champions: 2011, 2017-2018

=== Girls' lacrosse ===
The girls' lacrosse team won their first state championship in 2009. The Lady Cougars defeated four-time defending state champions, the Milton Eagles, to take home the title. They won with a score of 9 to 7.

=== Boys' lacrosse ===
The boys' lacrosse team finished ranked first in the state in 2003 despite losing in the state championship game to Westminster 11–9.

=== Cheerleading ===
The competitive cheerleading team won the State Championship in 2000, 2001, 2003, and 2005.

=== Football ===
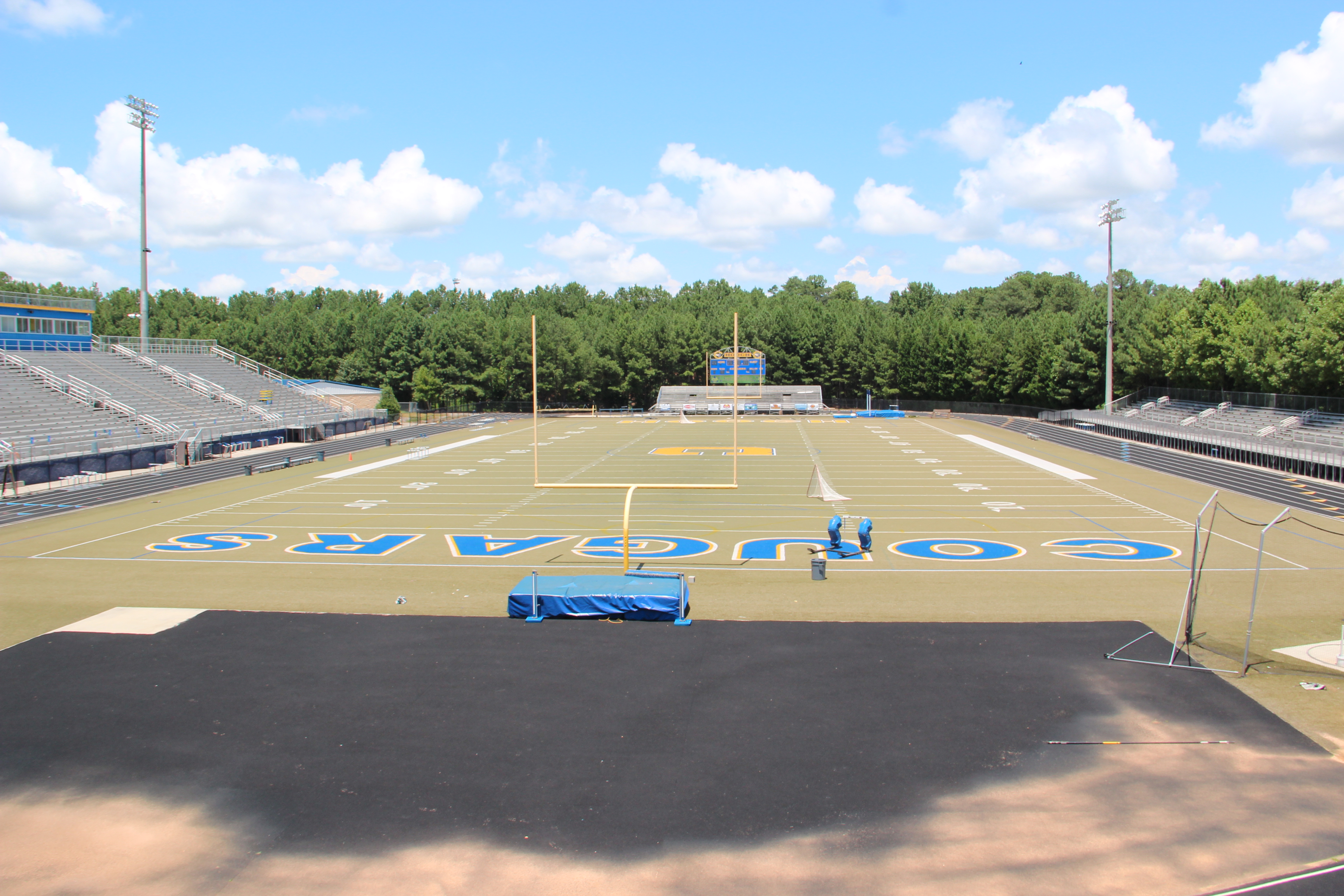
Chattahoochee High School football stadium

The Chattahoochee High School football team had its first season in 1991, competing in Region 6-Division AAAA, the highest classification at the time. The team ended the season with a respectable record of 3-7 for their first year of varsity football.

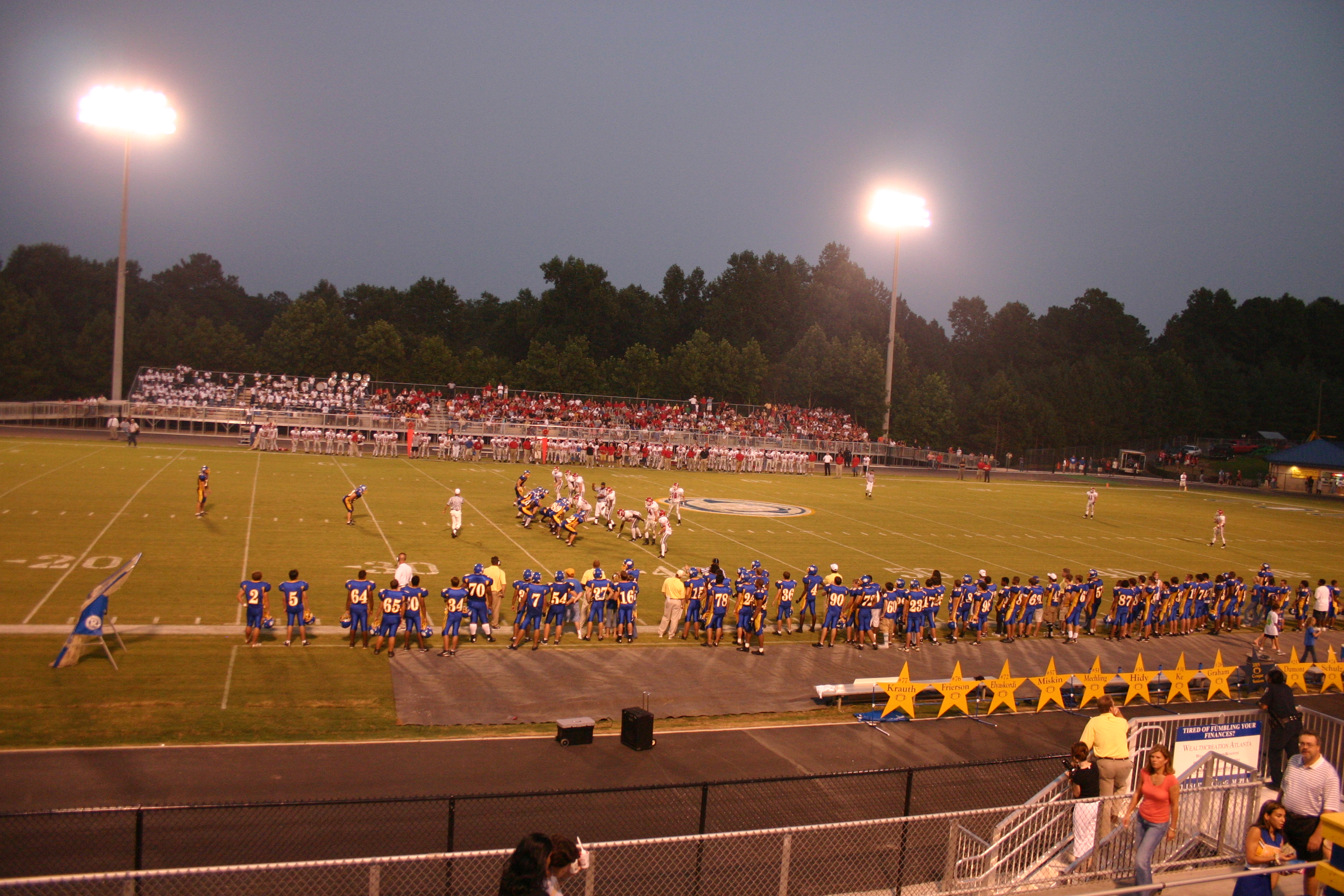
Chattahoochee Cougars football game against the North Gwinnett Bulldogs on September 2, 2005

In the 2008 season, the Cougars were moved to the much more competitive Region 7-AAAAA where they played mostly Gwinnett County schools that were much bigger than them as opposed to the smaller Fulton County teams. For the 2010 season, the Cougars were moved down to AAAA since the opening of Johns Creek High School pulled many students away from Chattahoochee. The Cougars met the undefeated Starr's Mill Panthers at the Georgia Dome for the state championship. Chattahoochee won 24–0, finishing off a perfect 15–0 season and their first state title. The Cougars were nationally ranked.

=== Swimming ===
The girls' swim team won the GA High School State Championship in 1993, 1995, 1996 and 2000. The boys' swim team won the GA High School State Championship in 1996 and 2023.

=== Tennis ===
- 1998: Girls' team won the 1998 AAAA State Championship, posting an undefeated record while being ranked 11th nationally at one point.
- 1999: Girls win 3rd State Championship in a row while being ranked 2nd nationally.
- 2004: Boys win State Championship

== Music ==
=== Band ===
- Chattahoochee has one jazz band, four concert bands, a woodwind quintet, a saxophone quartet, a saxophone ensemble, a tuba and euphonium choir, a trombone choir, an indoor drumline, a winter guard, and a marching band. The Cougar Marching Band returned to Annapolis in 2010 for their third consecutive national competition, and performed in USSBA Nationals 2013 in Met Life Stadium, coming first in their class in percussion. Jazz 1, the top jazz band, was invited to perform at the Annual GMEA State Convention on Friday, January 30, 2009, in Savannah, Georgia. The Chattahoochee High School Tuba and Euphonium Choir was invited to perform as a lobby group for the Atlanta Youth Wind Symphony at the GMEA In-service Conference in Athens, Georgia on January 31, 2025.
- In 1997, the marching band went on a European tour performing in London and Paris.
- The Chattahoochee marching band was invited to participate in the 2007 London New Year's Day Parade. The band has also participated in the 2012 New York St. Patrick's Day parade and the 2013 Fiesta Bowl in Phoenix, Arizona. The band was the 2007 USSBA Florida, Georgia, and Tennessee Tri-State champion. The marching band participated in the 2008, 2009, and 2010 USSBA National Championships in Annapolis, Maryland, and the 2013 championship in New Jersey. In 2008, the band took 7th in their class and 3rd overall in the percussion caption. In 2009, the marching band placed 6th in class AAAA. In 2010, the band placed 20th in class AAA. In 2013, the percussion placed first in their division.
- In 2019, the marching band participated in the Grand National Championships, hosted by Bands of America. The band reached the semi-finals, placing 38th out of 91 bands.
- In 2023, the band returned to the Bands of America Grand National Championships. The band placed 50th out of 91 bands in their preliminary performance.
- In 2025, the band performed in the Cherry Blossom Parade in Washington DC for the first time.

=== Orchestra ===
- Chattahoochee has an orchestra program which is currently conducted by Lori Buonamici.

=== Chorus ===
- Chattahoochee has a chorus program.

== Literary activities ==
=== Student newspaper ===
The Speculator: Voice and Vision is the school news magazine and news website for Chattahoochee High School. The Speculator originally began at Crestwood High School in 1974, and moved to Chattahoochee when the school opened in 1991. The Speculator was a monthly newspaper up until the 2010–2011 school year, when the staff decided to switch to a news magazine layout, allowing more incorporation of graphics and more involvement with the school's Imaginarium graphic design department. In the fall of 2011, the staff and graphics department jointly decided to add the "Voice" ending to the magazine title, to represent to magazine as the voice of the students. The Speculator: Voice is released five times a year. The Speculator: Vision is the news website version of the Speculator: Voice and was launched during the 2011–2012 school year.

=== Yearbook ===
The yearbook at Chattahoochee is called the Current and has published every year since its opening in 1991.

=== Literary magazine ===
CHS produces a literary magazine called Chrysalis that features art and writing by its students.

== Extracurricular activities ==
CHS offers over 100 clubs. Notable clubs are the debate team (which has won nine state championships and been a frequent qualifier to the national Tournament of Champions, placing 2nd in 2005), Science Olympiad, Academic Bowl (which has been a constant state champion and national qualifier), Chess Club (which won the 2005 State Championship and runner-up in the 2018), and the Table Top Gaming Club which has won state 10 years in a row.

== Alumni Pavilion ==
The Alumni Pavilion is located at the south end of the Arena. It contains 2,046 square feet (190.1 m^{2}) of covered space and a 744 square feet (69.1 m^{2}) viewing deck, and consists of steel beam construction, wood finished columns, and a concrete deck. The pavilion is positioned as an overlook to the Arena and has hosted numerous pre-game activities such as cookouts and booster meetings.

== Renovations ==
The school received numerous renovations from the summer of 2014 until the summer of 2015.

== Notable alumni ==
- Jaron Blossomgame (born 1993), Clemson University men's basketball, NBA player for the Cleveland Cavaliers, basketball player in the Israeli Basketball Premier League
- Clint Boling, University of Georgia football player (2007–2010), NFL Cincinnati Bengals, University of Georgia lacrosse player (2005–2008)
- John Busing, former professional football player
- Tony Dibrell, professional baseball pitcher for the Southern Maryland Blue Crabs
- Andi Dorfman, contestant on The Bachelorette
- Geoff Duncan, former Lieutenant Governor of Georgia
- Anthony Fisher (born 1986), basketball player in the Israeli Basketball Premier League
- Jay Litherland, USA Olympic Swim Team
- Sam Park, politician, Georgia House of Representatives
- Marcus Sayles, Buffalo Bills
- Charlie Whitehurst, retired NFL quarterback
