= RiverPines Golf =

Coordinates: 34.010164°N 84.223476°W

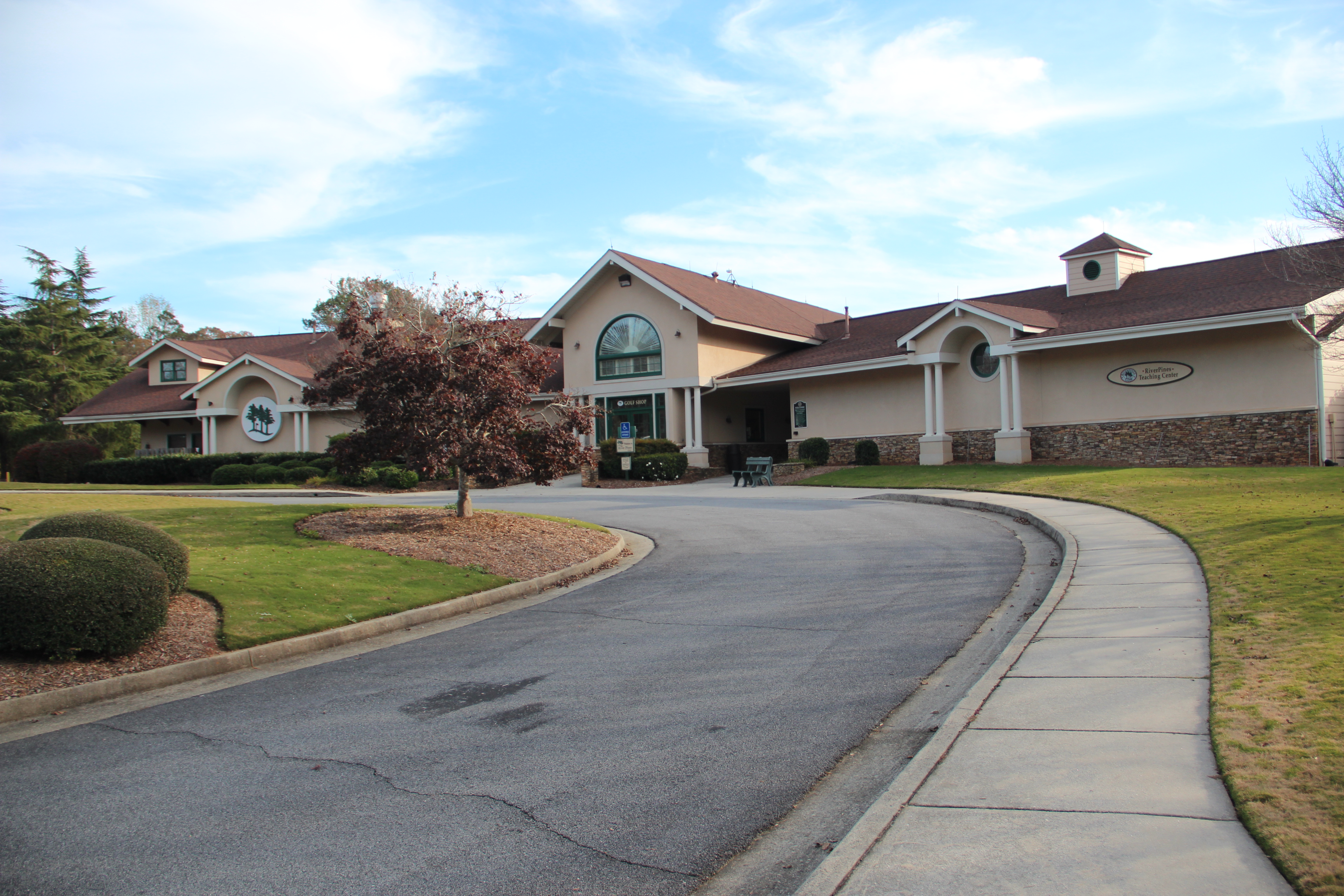
RiverPines Golf front offices

RiverPines Golf is a public golf facility located in Johns Creek, Georgia north of Atlanta, Georgia.

== Establishment ==
RiverPines Golf opened in the fall of 1990 as a 9 hole par 3 course and driving range. In the fall of 1992, RiverPines opened the 18 hole championship golf course designed by Denis Griffiths. It plays to a yardage of 6600 yards and a par of 70. The facility has an instructional program featuring top 100 Golf Magazine instructor Mike Perpich. In addition to the golfing facilities, RiverPines has a pro shop with brands such as Titleist and Callaway as well as a bar/grill area known as the Shadetree Grill.
