= The OrganWise Guys =

Children's organization based in Duluth, Georgia

- Available in: English, Spanish
- Headquarters: Suwanee, Georgia
- Area served: Early Childcare Centers, Elementary Schools, Communities, Summer Camps, Faith-based Sites, Supermarkets, Doctor's Offices
- Founders: Dr. Michelle Lombardo and Karen McNamara
- Industry: Healthcare, Education
- Products: Childhood Obesity Prevention
- Services: Nutrition Education, Health Education
- Website: http://www.organwiseguys.com

The OrganWise Guys (OWG) was created in 1993 in Duluth, Georgia, to teach young children about the importance of making healthy choices in their lives through learning about their internal organs. The goal of OWG programming is to educate children and adults about nutrition and healthy living, and to prevent childhood obesity.

== Concept ==
Rather than learning about organs through textbooks, OWG uses fictional animated characters and puppets to teach children about their bodies in an age appropriate manner.

OWG's messages rely on the theme of empowerment, encouraging children to understand the importance of their health at a young age. The main "rules" of the OWG Club are to: eat a low fat and high fiber diet, drink lots of water, and get plenty of exercise. Characters like the Kidney Brothers discuss the importance of drinking water to keep the blood clean, and Peter Pancreas explains how he controls sugar levels in the body by making insulin. The OWG school-based nutrition and healthy living education curricula is matched to the Common Core State Standards Initiative for grades pre K-5.

== Research ==
The Healthier Options for Public Schoolchildren (2004–2009), a quasi-experimental study in elementary schools, was designed to test the efficacy of 1) changes to meals served to children at school, 2) nutrition and healthy lifestyle curricula linked to the core subject requirements, monthly food-based social marketing and education, and daily physical activity (including OWG), and 3) other school-based wellness activities such as school gardens. HOPS resulted in statistically significant improvements in program children's weight, blood pressure, and waist circumference measures, as well as significantly higher average standardized test scores, as compared to outcomes of children in non-program schools.

== Areas of work ==
OWG materials are used in early childcare centers, elementary schools, communities, summer camps, faith-based institutions, supermarkets, and clinics throughout the United States. From 2009 to 2012, a $2 million grant funded by the W.K. Kellogg Foundation to the Mississippi Food Network provided funds to a land-grant university cooperative extension service to carry out OWG programming in Arkansas, Florida, Louisiana, Mississippi, Michigan, and New Mexico. The concept of schools as "hubs" of obesity prevention was further developed through the work made possible by this grant, and this is the approach that OWG takes in its childhood obesity prevention efforts.
