= Rogers Bridge Park =

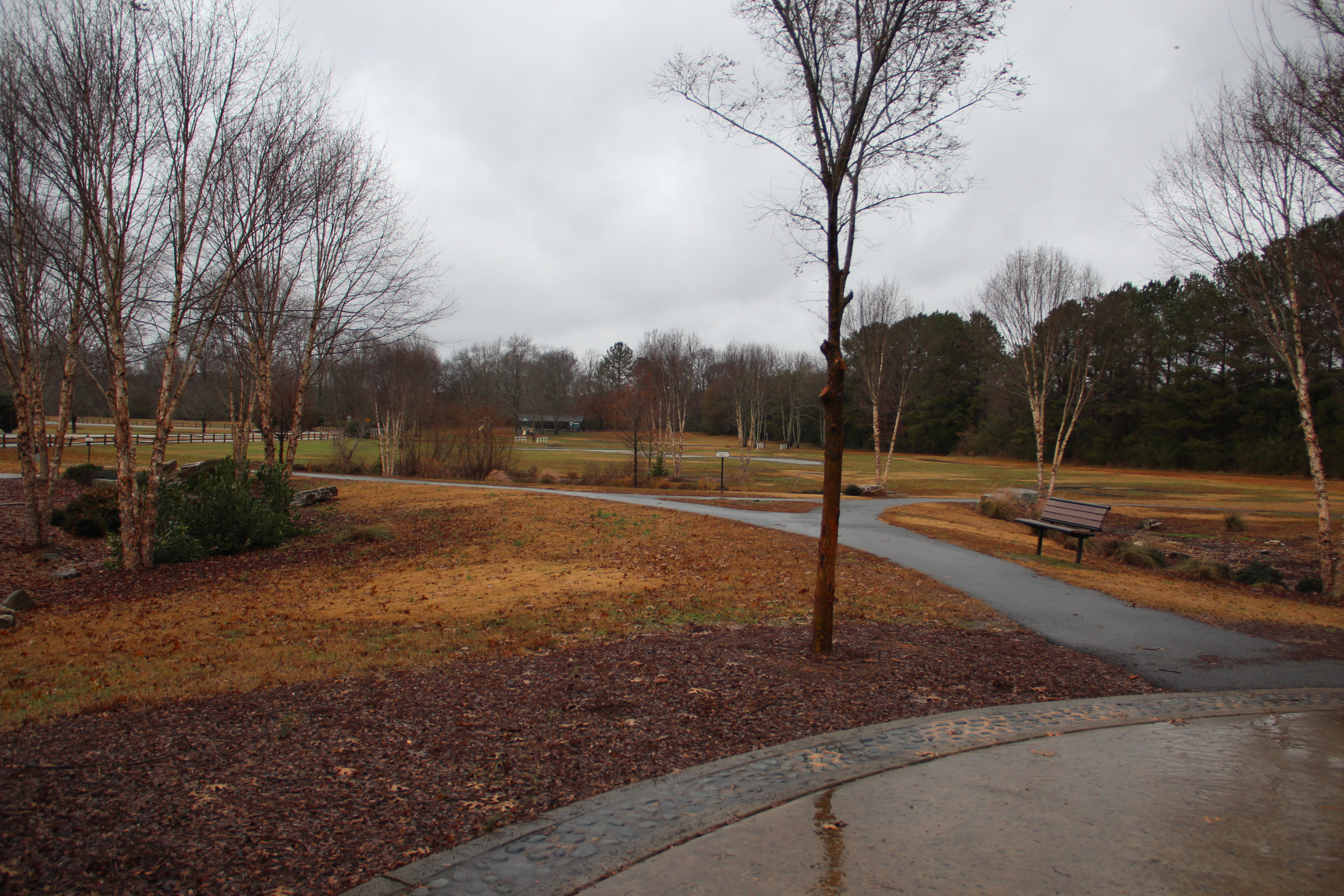
- Rogers Bridge Park in 2018
- Interactive map of Rogers Bridge Park
- Type: Multi-use
- Location: 4000 Rogers Bridge Rd NW, Duluth, Georgia, United States
- Coordinates: 34°01′39.5″N 84°08′21″W
- Area: 16.98 acres (68,700 m^{2})
- Created: 2012
- Operator: Duluth Parks & Recreation Department
- Open: All year
- Website: Rogers Bridge Park

Rogers Bridge Park is a riverfront city park and dog park (Chattapoochee Dog Park) in Duluth, Georgia. It is a 16.98-acre park located in the northwestern quadrant of Duluth. The park is a few blocks north of Peachtree Industrial Boulevard on Rogers Bridge Road. Surrounding properties include an adjacent private event facility, a sand dredging facility, and single-family residential neighborhoods.

== Trails ==
The remains of a historic steel bridge span the Chattahoochee River. Although the bridge is in disrepair, the structure is sound and construction has begun to restore the bridge for bike/pedestrian purposes. The park sits at a strategic location, adjacent to the river and at the intersection of several planned, but not constructed, multi-use trails. The trails include the Western Gwinnett Bikeway along Peachtree Industrial Boulevard, The Rogers Bridge Trail along Rogers Bridge Road and the Chattahoochee River Greenway which follows the river along the city’s northern boundary.

== Amenities ==
The Chattahoochee River flows along the northern boundary of the park. Approximately two-thirds of the park is an open grassy field with small wooded areas along the stream buffer and at the southern end of the park. A gravel parking lot, picnic pavilion, and playground, are the only recreational amenities in the park. The private event facility includes large open space, a small multi-use building, and a boat ramp; a city easement provides public access to the boat ramp.

- 3,100 square foot pavilion
- 1 playground
- 15 space gravel parking lot
- 2 horseshoe pits
- 10 tables and 2 grills picnic area

=== Chattapoochee Dog Park ===
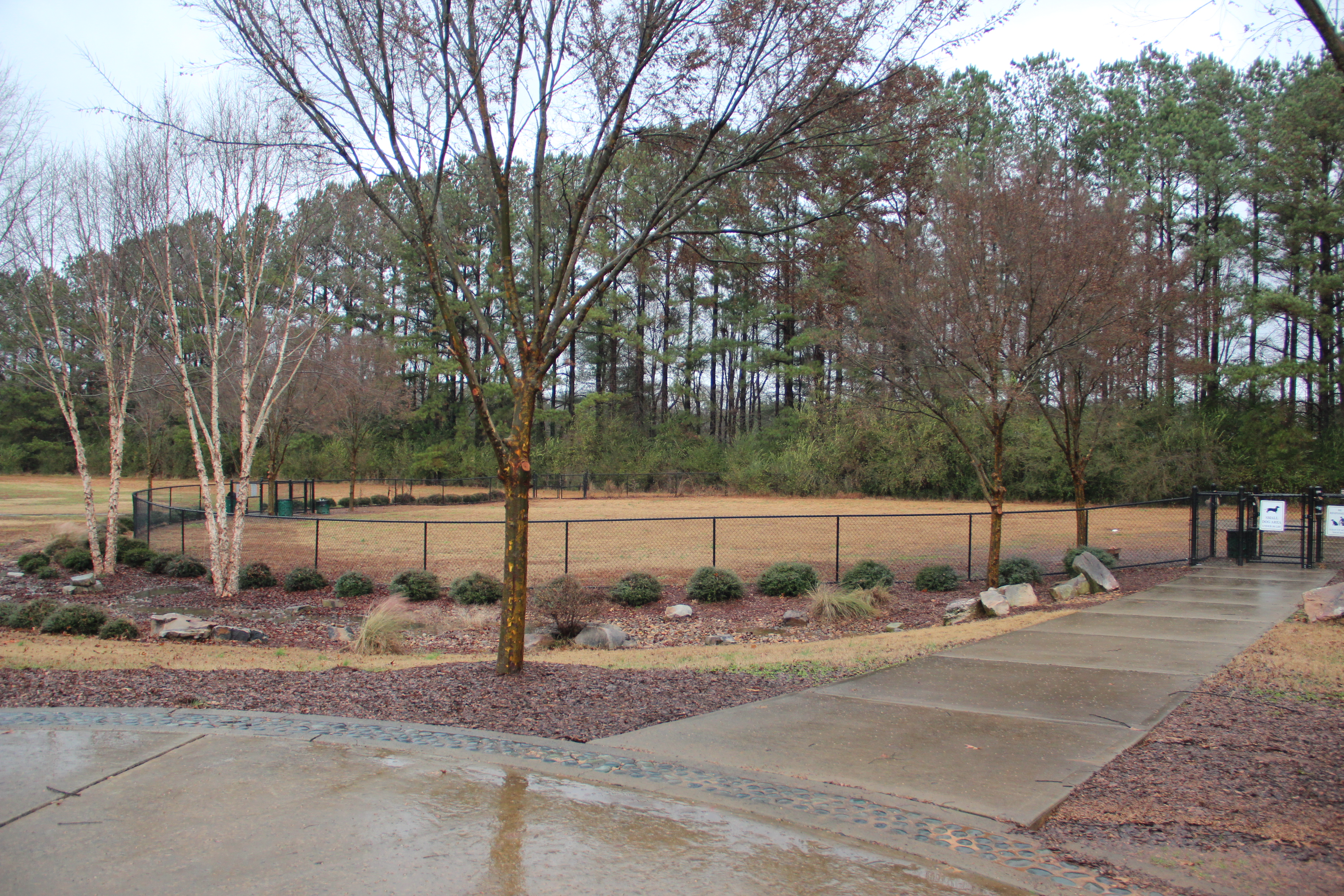
Dog park at Rogers Bridge Park

It is the first dog park created in the city. Located on nearly three acres, the park is in the northeast section of Duluth adjacent to the Chattahoochee River. In 2017, the park was identified as one of the seven best dog parks in Metro Atlanta by the AJC. In 2018, the dog park won third place in Atlanta and first in Gwinnett County.

- One acre dog park for small dogs with an interactive fountain
- Two acre large dog park with an interactive fountain
- Seating areas
- Dog agility equipment
- Green space

== See also ==
- Chattahoochee River
- Western Gwinnett Bikeway
