= Johns Creek, Georgia =

- City
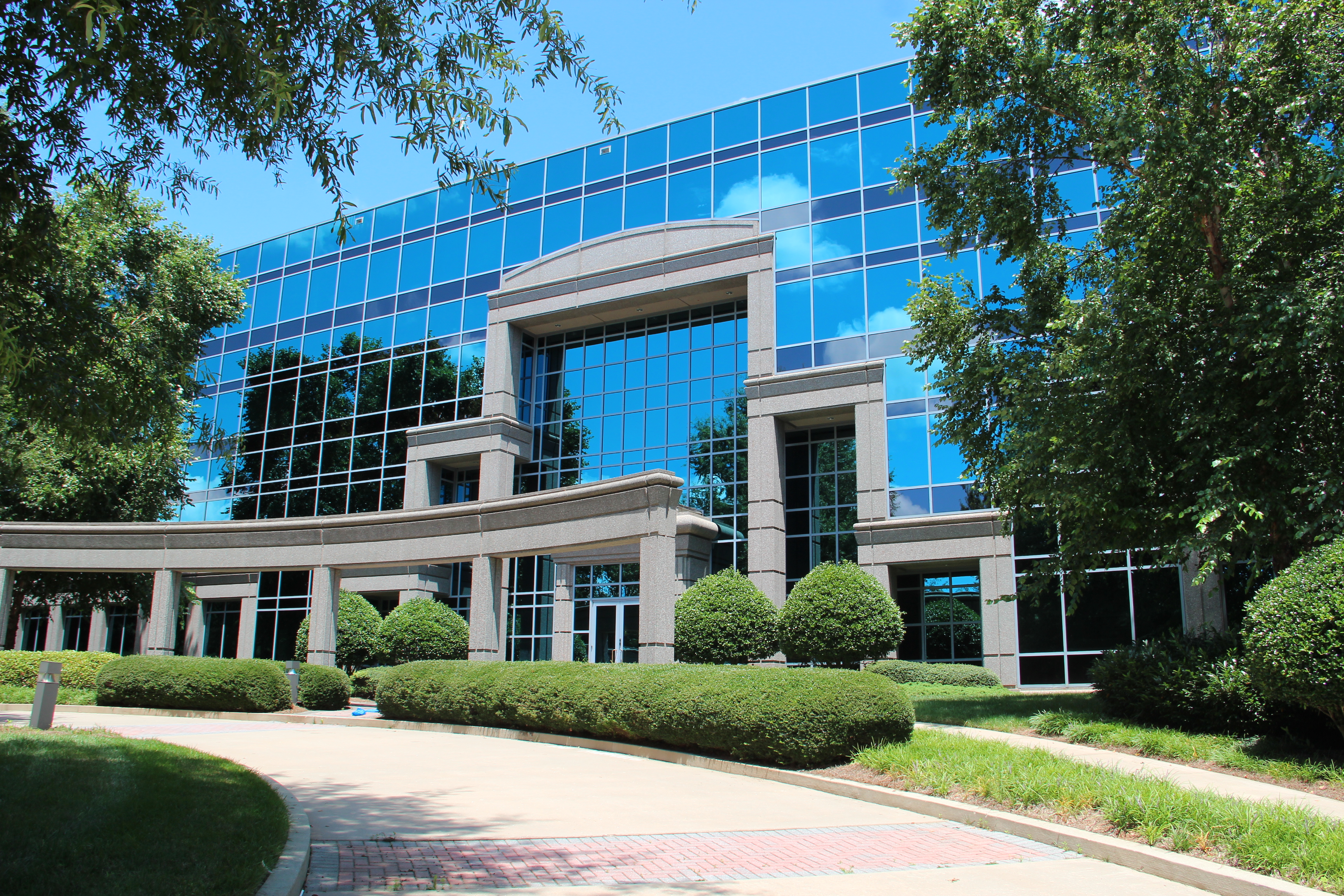
- The former Johns Creek City Hall

- Interactive map of Johns Creek, Georgia
- Coordinates: 34°02′00″N 84°12′10″W
- Country: United States
- State: Georgia
- County: Fulton
- Incorporated: December 1, 2006

Government
  - Mayor: John Bradbarry (R)
  - City Manager: Ed Densmore
  - City Council: Dilip Tunki, Stacy Skinner, Bob Erramilli, Chris Coughlin, Larry Dibiase, Erin Elwood

Area
  - Total: 31.34 sq mi (81.18 km^{2})
  - Land: 30.81 sq mi (79.81 km^{2})
  - Water: 0.53 sq mi (1.38 km^{2})
- Elevation: 945 ft (288 m)

Population (2020)
  - Total: 82,453
  - Density: 2,675.9/sq mi (1,033.17/km^{2})
- Time zone: UTC−5 (EST)
  - Summer (DST): UTC−4 (EDT)
- ZIP codes: None assigned to Johns Creek by USPS as it does not recognize the city. 30005, 30022, 30024, 30097, 30098 from other cities apply in various parts of Johns Creek.
- Area codes: 770, 404, 678, 470
- GNIS feature ID: 2404806
- Website: johnscreekga.gov

Johns Creek is a city in Fulton County, Georgia, United States. According to the 2020 census, the population was 82,453. The city is a northeastern suburb of Atlanta.

== History ==
In the early 19th century, the Johns Creek area was dotted with trading posts along the Chattahoochee River in what was then Cherokee territory. The Cherokee Nation at the time was a confederacy of agrarian villages led by a chief. After European settlement, the Cherokee developed an alphabet, and a legislature and judiciary system patterned after the American model.

Some trading posts gradually became crossroads communities where pioneer families – Rogers, McGinnis, Findley, Buice, Cowart, Medlock and others – gathered to visit and sell their crops.

By 1820, the community of Sheltonville (or Shakerag), was a ferry crossing site, with the McGinnis Ferry and Rogers Ferry carrying people and livestock across the river for a small fee. Further south, the Nesbit Ferry did the same near another crossroads community known as Newtown.

In the 1820s, the discovery of gold in the foothills of northeast Georgia within the Cherokee Nation – approximately 45 miles (72 km) north of today's Johns Creek – led to America's second major Gold Rush, the eventual takeover of the Cherokee Nation by the U.S. government in 1830, and the subsequent forced exile (the "Trail of Tears") of Cherokee Indians to Oklahoma and other areas of the American West.

A few Cherokees remained, the most famous being Sarah Cordery (1785–1842), the half-blood Cherokee wife of pioneer John Rogers (1774–1851), and their 12 children. Rogers was a respected, influential plantation owner and colleague of President Andrew Jackson. Rogers's 1828 home – today, a private residence in Johns Creek – was an overnight stop-over for Jackson. Much later, the home was also visited by famed humorist Will Rogers, the great-great-nephew of John Rogers. Johns Creek's name comes from John Rogers's son, Johnson K. Rogers. A local tributary was named after him, and the name "Johns Creek" eventually came to be the name of the area.

In 1831, much of the land in the former Cherokee Nation north of the Chattahoochee was combined into the massive Cherokee County. When Milton County was formed in 1858, the Johns Creek area was folded into it.

In the 1930s, during the Great Depression, Milton County was dissolved and all of its land was then absorbed into Fulton County.

The four main crossroad communities — Ocee, Newtown, Sheltonville and Warsaw — remained the social, educational and business centers of rural, unincorporated northeast Fulton County. For the next 50 years, these communities helped bring a sense of identity to this largely undeveloped and underpopulated area, as the nearby cities of Roswell, Alpharetta, Duluth and Suwanee and adjoining Forsyth and Gwinnett counties continued to grow and develop.

In 1981, a group of Georgia Institute of Technology graduates bought 1,700 acres (6.9 km^{2}) of farmland and woods near McGinnis Ferry and Medlock Bridge Roads for a high-tech office park. The new office park was to mirror one built in 1970 in nearby Peachtree Corners, known as Technology Park/Atlanta. Spotting tiny Johns Creek on an old map, they named their mixed-use, master-planned community "Technology Park/Johns Creek". This is the first reference to Johns Creek as a place. The area grew over the years to become the home of 200 companies – many of them Fortune 500 firms – with nearly 11,000 people spread over 6,000,000 square feet (560,000 m^{2}) of office, retail and industrial space. With the jobs came houses and shopping centers, and the population increased to about 60,000.

By 2000, a grassroots movement to incorporate the Johns Creek area into a city was slowly developing. Residents wanted more control over issues such as traffic, growth, development and quality of life. They also sought a level of service that was a challenge for the sprawling Fulton County to provide. Following the nearby city of Sandy Springs’ successful incorporation in 2005, a legislative campaign was started to incorporate the Johns Creek community. House Bill 1321 was passed by the state legislature, signed by Gov. Sonny Perdue in March 2006, and approved by the residents of northeast Fulton County in a July 18, 2006 voter referendum. In November 2006, the city's first elected officials were voted into office, with the City of Johns Creek becoming official December 1, 2006.

Newtown Elementary School, built in 1929, is Johns Creek's only listing on the National Register of Historic Places. (Note: That Newtown Elementary School is the only NRHP listing in Johns Creek can be verified by review of locations of all National Register of Historic Places listings in Fulton County, Georgia) It was listed in August 2006, with location described as "near Alpharetta", before Johns Creek's incorporation was completed.

In 2017, an iHeartJC initiative founded by local resident has been growing to have the city's residential, business and innovation ecosystem develop a long-term strength and identity in healthcare innovation and wellness. The resolution passed a year later. Since then, the city has had over 700 companies and 1400 professionals in life sciences as well as 450 companies and 13,000 jobs in healthcare, including recently Boston Scientific move, build, or work there. In 2022, the group was renamed Johns Creek Vitality.

== Geography ==
Johns Creek is located in northeastern Fulton County. The elevation ranges from 880 feet (270 m) above sea level along the Chattahoochee River to 1,180 feet (360 m) in the Ocee area along the Alpharetta border. Johns Creek is bounded to the south by the Chattahoochee River and Gwinnett County, and on the northeast by McGinnis Ferry Road and Forsyth County. It is bounded by Roswell to the west, Alpharetta to the northwest, Suwanee to the east, and Duluth, Berkeley Lake, and Peachtree Corners to the south. Downtown Atlanta is 27 miles (43 km) to the southwest.

According to the U.S. Census Bureau, the city of Johns Creek has a total area of 31.3 square miles (81.0 km^{2}), of which 30.7 square miles (79.6 km^{2}) is land and 0.54 square miles (1.4 km^{2}), or 1.76%, is water.

=== Climate ===
Johns Creek has a humid subtropical climate (Köppen climate classification Cfa).

Climate data for Johns Creek, Georgia
Month	Jan	Feb	Mar	Apr	May	Jun	Jul	Aug	Sep	Oct	Nov	Dec	Year
Record high °F (°C)	75 (24)	80 (27)	88 (31)	91 (33)	95 (35)	101 (38)	102 (39)	101 (38)	98 (37)	88 (31)	84 (29)	76 (24)	102 (39)
Mean daily maximum °F (°C)	50 (10)	55 (13)	63 (17)	71 (22)	78 (26)	84 (29)	88 (31)	86 (30)	81 (27)	72 (22)	62 (17)	53 (12)	70 (21)
Mean daily minimum °F (°C)	29 (−2)	32 (0)	38 (3)	45 (7)	54 (12)	62 (17)	67 (19)	66 (19)	60 (16)	47 (8)	39 (4)	32 (0)	48 (9)
Record low °F (°C)	−10 (−23)	1 (−17)	6 (−14)	24 (−4)	31 (−1)	40 (4)	48 (9)	50 (10)	28 (−2)	25 (−4)	10 (−12)	−1 (−18)	−10 (−23)
Average precipitation inches (mm)	5.34 (136)	4.78 (121)	5.52 (140)	4.04 (103)	4.63 (118)	3.66 (93)	4.17 (106)	4.32 (110)	3.87 (98)	3.58 (91)	3.73 (95)	4.18 (106)	51.82 (1,316)

== Demographics ==
Historical population
Census	Pop.	Note	%±
2010	76,728		—
2020	82,453		7.5%
2025 (est.)	80,401	▼	−2.5%
U.S. Decennial Census; 1850-1870 1870-1880; 1890-1910 1920-1930; 1940 1950 1960; 1970 1980 1990; 2000 2010 2020; 2025

Johns Creek first appeared in the 2010 U.S. census.

=== Racial and ethnic composition ===
Johns Creek, Georgia – Racial and ethnic composition Note: the US Census treats Hispanic/Latino as an ethnic category. This table excludes Latinos from the racial categories and assigns them to a separate category. Hispanics/Latinos may be of any race.
Race / Ethnicity (NH = Non-Hispanic)	Pop 2010	Pop 2020	% 2010	% 2020
White alone (NH)	45,978	39,483	59.92%	47.89%
Black or African American alone (NH)	6,925	8,528	9.03%	10.34%
Native American or Alaska Native alone (NH)	69	73	0.09%	0.09%
Asian alone (NH)	17,892	24,603	23.32%	29.84%
Native Hawaiian or Pacific Islander alone (NH)	22	38	0.03%	0.05%
Other race alone (NH)	219	524	0.29%	0.64%
Mixed race or Multiracial (NH)	1,623	3,414	2.12%	4.14%
Hispanic or Latino (any race)	4,000	5,790	5.21%	7.02%
Total	76,728	82,453	100.00%	100.00%

=== 2020 census ===
As of the 2020 census, Johns Creek had a population of 82,453. The median age was 41.0 years. 25.5% of residents were under the age of 18 and 11.8% of residents were 65 years of age or older. For every 100 females there were 94.7 males, and for every 100 females age 18 and over there were 92.3 males age 18 and over.

100.0% of residents lived in urban areas, while 0.0% lived in rural areas.

There were 27,926 households and 23,283 families in Johns Creek; 43.9% had children under the age of 18 living in them. Of all households, 68.0% were married-couple households, 10.6% were households with a male householder and no spouse or partner present, and 18.7% were households with a female householder and no spouse or partner present. About 15.0% of all households were made up of individuals and 5.7% had someone living alone who was 65 years of age or older.

There were 29,139 housing units, of which 4.2% were vacant. The homeowner vacancy rate was 1.1% and the rental vacancy rate was 9.4%.

=== 2010 census ===
In 2010, its population was 76,728.

Johns Creek's 2010 demographics showed an estimated $109,576 median household income, a $137,271 average household income and a $45,570 per capita income.

== Economy ==
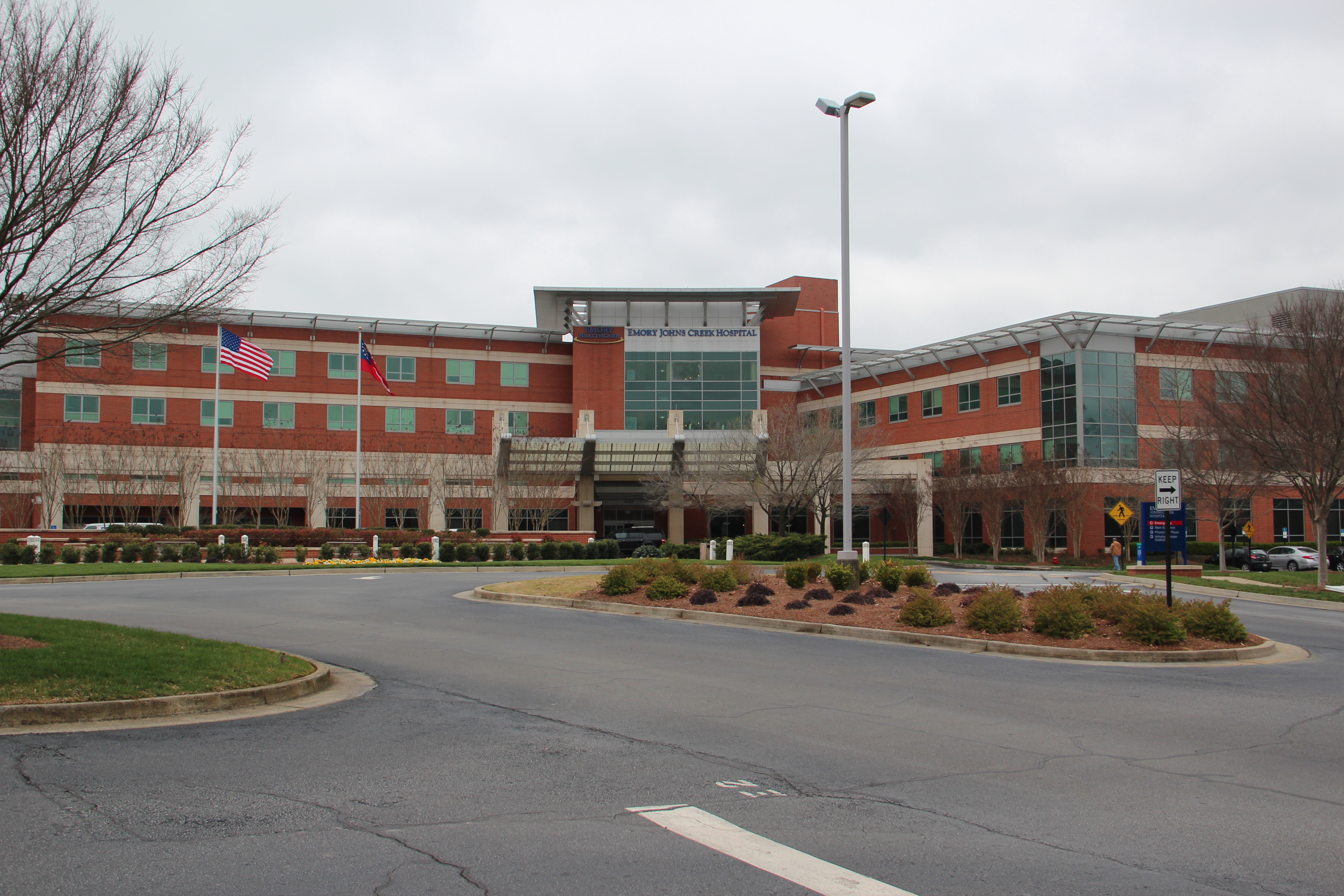
Emory Johns Creek Hospital

=== Top employers ===
According to the city's 2025 Annual Comprehensive Financial Report, the top employers in the city were:

#	Employer	# of Employees
1	Alcon	1781
2	Emory Johns Creek Hospital	1200
3	Macy's	1057
4	Saia	1015
5	Kroger	446
6	Publix	446
7	Quikrete International	283
8	EndoChoice	260
9	Nordson Corporation	235
10	Country Club of the South	211

== Arts and culture ==
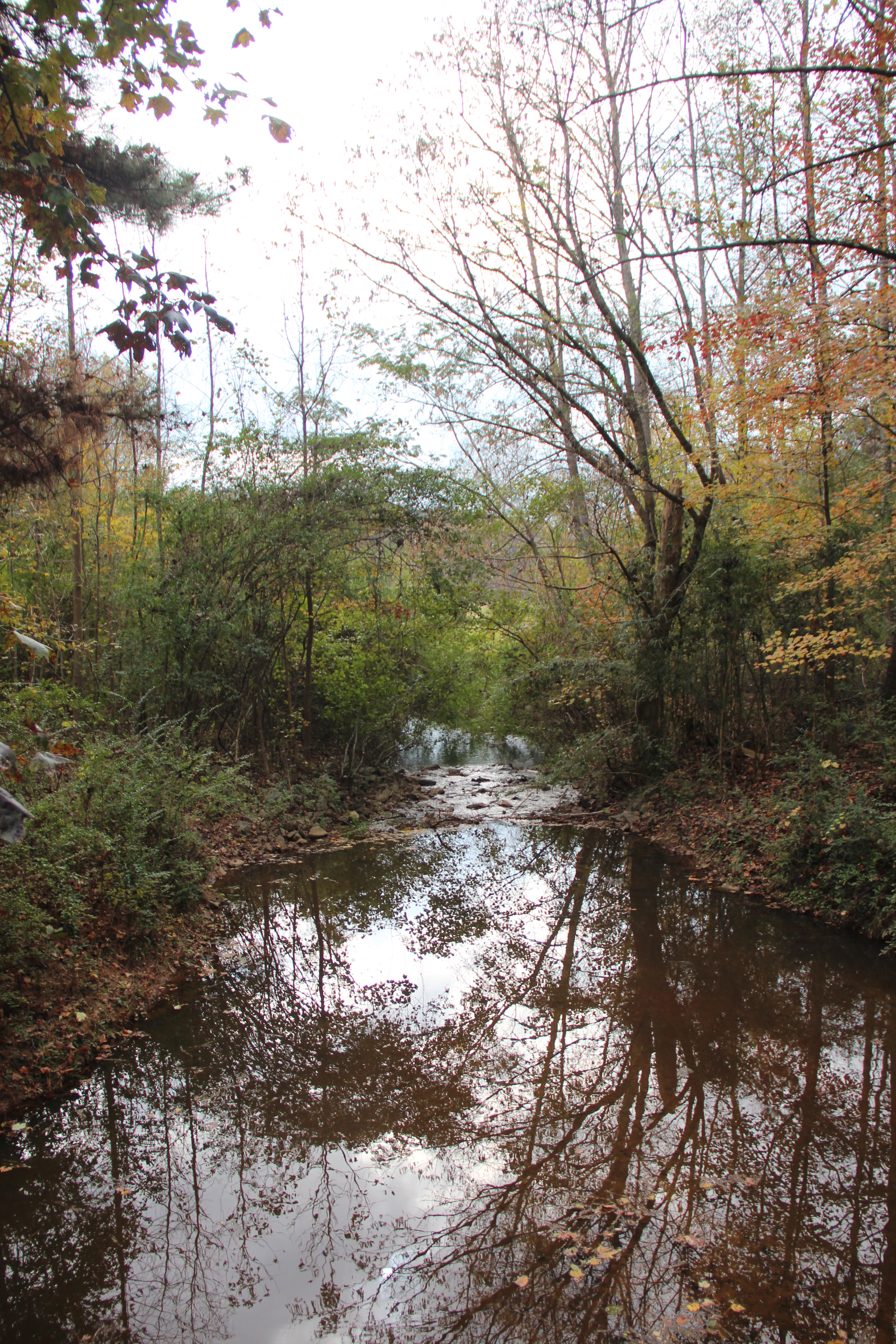
Johns Creek was named after Johns Creek, a tributary of the Chattahoochee River.

Johns Creek has metro Atlanta's only part-time, fully professional symphony orchestra, the Johns Creek Symphony Orchestra. Under the leadership of Music Director J. Wayne Baughman, the orchestra performs several times each year.

The Johns Creek Arts Center offers classes and camps for aspiring artists in multiple media throughout the year.

There also are several festivals year-round, such as Founders Week in December in which the community celebrates the city's incorporation with activities and a parade. The Fall Family Festival in September is a community get-together at Newtown Park. Arts on the Creek is a juried art show, and also has musical and stage performers. "The Taste of Johns Creek" is an annual food festival in the fall that features more than 40 local restaurants with proceeds supporting public school extracurricular activities.

There are six golf facilities (five private, one public) in Johns Creek, including the renowned Atlanta Athletic Club, home of the 2011 PGA Championship and the 2014 U.S. Amateur. Other golf facilities include Country Club of the South, Rivermont Golf and Country Club, River Pines Golf, St. Ives Country Club, and The Standard Club.

The Atlanta Athletic Club was the site of the inaugural Atlanta Tennis Championships in 2010. Johns Creek is home to thousands of members of the Atlanta Lawn Tennis Association (ALTA), one of the largest and oldest organized recreation leagues in the country.

Johns Creek, which is bordered by 13.5 miles (21.7 km) of the Chattahoochee River, has multiple nearby spots where paddlers can put in or take out their boats. It has shoals and low-level rapids. It also offers prime trout fishing.

Autrey Mill Nature Preserve and Heritage Center offers a replica of a Creek Indian hut, an 1800s historic village, and wildlife in 46 acres (190,000 m^{2}) of woodlands. Biking the 4-mile (6 km) Greenway along Georgia 141 is a popular pastime. The city has plans to develop and connect other pathways to the Greenway, which will tie in with other cities, adding several miles of trails.

Atlanta-Fulton Public Library System operates the Northeast Spruill Oaks Library and Ocee Regional Library.

=== Johns Creek International Festival ===
Each April, the city hosts the annual Johns Creek International Festival. In 2017, over 23,000 visitors attended the event. It is one of the most culturally diverse cities in the state and nation, representing many countries and cultures from around the world. This free community event features restaurants and food trucks, vendors, international beer and wine garden, live music and dance performances, and fun kids’ activities.

== Education ==
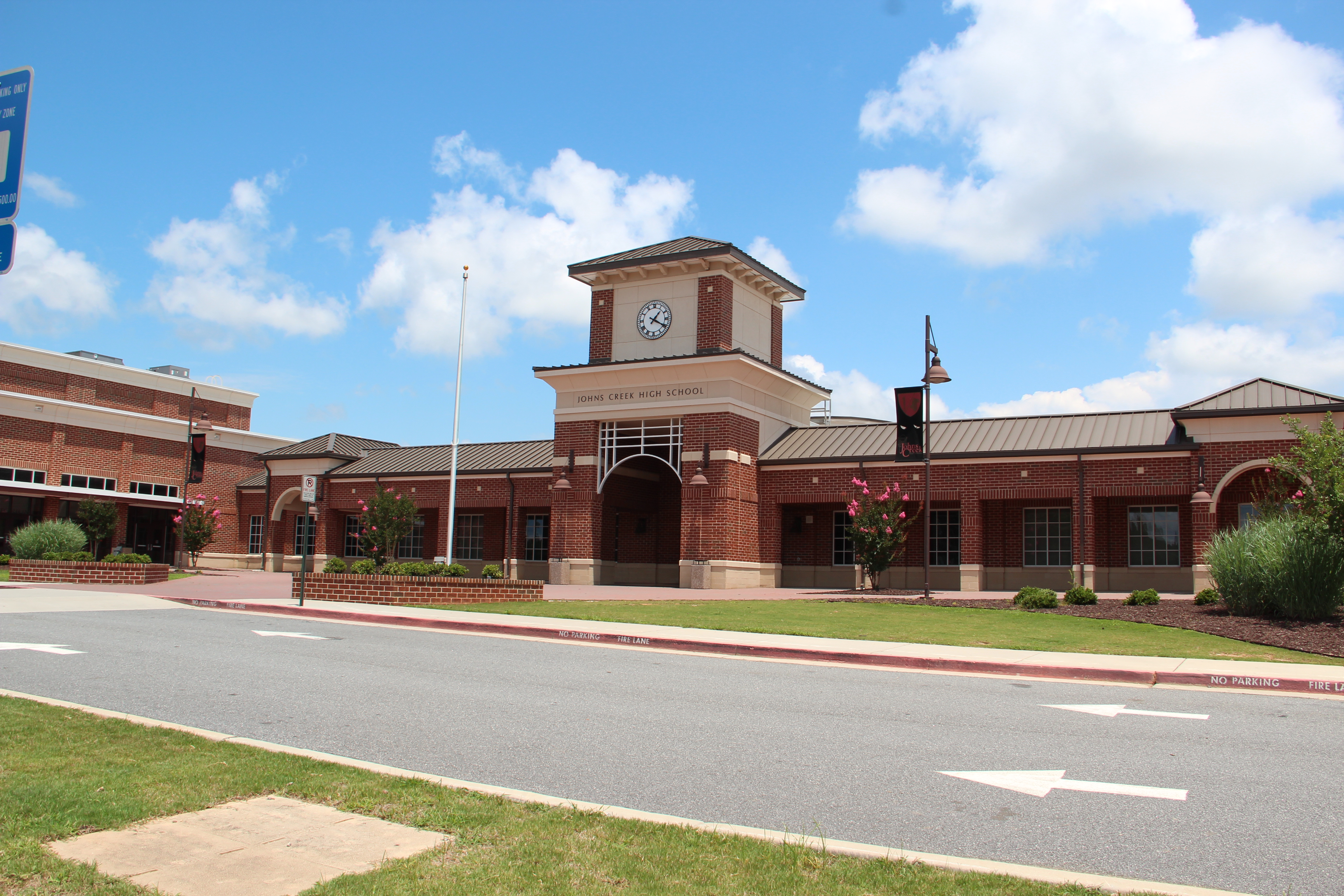
Johns Creek High School

Public schools are operated by Fulton County Schools. Schools located in Johns Creek include:

=== Elementary schools ===
- Abbotts Hill Elementary School
- Barnwell Elementary School
- Dolvin Elementary School
- Findley Oaks Elementary School
- Lake Windward Elementary School
- Medlock Bridge Elementary School
- Ocee Elementary School
- Shakerag Elementary School
- State Bridge Crossing Elementary School
- Wilson Creek Elementary School

=== Middle schools ===
Autrey Mill, River Trail, and Taylor Road

=== High schools ===
Chattahoochee, Johns Creek and Northview

=== Private schools ===
- Perimeter School (Grades K-8)
- Providence Christian Academy - Johns Creek Campus (Grades 7-12)
- Woodward Academy - North Campus
- Cresco Montessori School
- Mount Pisgah Christian School (Grades Preschool- 12)
- Holy Redeemer Catholic School of the Roman Catholic Archdiocese of Atlanta. - The school opened in fall 1999.

== Infrastructure ==
=== Transportation ===
==== Major highways ====
- State Route 120
- State Route 141
- State Route 140

==== Public transportation ====
Johns Creek is not directly served by MARTA trains or buses. GRTA Xpress Route 408 formerly connected Johns Creek with the Doraville MARTA station.

==== Pedestrians and cycling ====
In January 2018, significant plans were approved for the engineering phase to upgrade State Bridge Road and Pleasant Hill Road. There is community-wide support from the community in both neighboring Johns Creek and Duluth for the pedestrian river bridge for the project. It will serve to improve bike pedestrian safety, boost local economies by improving access to businesses, enhance connections with surrounding neighborhoods and improve traffic flow in the area. In addition, the upgrade will serve to ease inspection and maintenance of the bridge in the future.

In March 2018, the Gwinnett County Commissioners approved the agreement with the Johns Creek City Council. Both sides have agreed to remove the sidewalks from the existing bridges in order to widen the roads. To improve safety for pedestrians, a new pedestrian bridge will be constructed on one side of the river. A pedestrian underpass linking both sides of the wider road is being considered to further improve access and provide for a safer crossing of the road.

The Rogers bridge project is another significant plan is to connect to Duluth via reconstructing a bike/pedestrian bridge across the Chattahoochee River. The engineers will determine whether to replace or rehabilitate the existing Rogers Bridge over the Chattahoochee River, will take into account the environmental impacts of each option, and will restore the working bike/pedestrian connection between Duluth and Johns Creek. This will allow access to the planned 133 acre parkland under development in Johns Creek, and will allow Fulton County residents access to Rogers Bridge Park, the Chattahoochee Dog Park, and the Western Gwinnett Bikeway currently under development by Gwinnett County.

=== Law enforcement ===
The Johns Creek Police Department launched April 27, 2008, and the fire department launched October 27, 2008. The police department was certified by the Georgia Association of Chiefs of Police and accredited by the Commission on Accreditation for Law Enforcement within two years of the department's formation.
