= National Register of Historic Places listings in Banks County, Georgia =

This is a list of properties and districts in Banks County, Georgia that are listed on the National Register of Historic Places (NRHP).

This National Park Service list is complete through NPS recent listings posted May 1, 2026.

== Current listings ==
	Name on the Register	Image	Date listed	Location	City or town	Description
1	Banks County Courthouse	Banks County Courthouse	September 18, 1980 (#80000969)	Off U.S. 441; 34°20′05″N 83°29′56″W	Homer	
2	Banks County Jail	Banks County Jail	July 26, 1982 (#82002382)	Silver Shoals Rd. 34°20′06″N 83°29′20″W	Homer	
3	Brooks Family Farm	Brooks Family Farm	July 23, 2013 (#13000529)	584 Silver Shoals Rd. 34°22′14″N 83°33′14″W	Lula	
4	William Chambers House	William Chambers House	November 7, 1996 (#96001305)	GA 51, approximately 1 mi. W of jct. with GA 63; 34°22′15″N 83°25′13″W	Homer	
5	Fort Hollingsworth-White House	Fort Hollingsworth-White House	August 6, 1998 (#19980806)	Wynn Lake Rd., 2 mi. SE of Hollingsworth; 34°25′35″N 83°32′02″W	Hollingsworth	
6	Gillsville Historic District	Gillsville Historic District	August 30, 1985 (#85001933)	GA 52; 34°18′38″N 83°38′20″W	Gillsville	
7	Hebron Church, Cemetery, and Academy	Hebron Church, Cemetery, and Academy	September 12, 1985 (#85002176)	Hebron Circle; 34°17′12″N 83°21′53″W	Commerce	
8	Homer Historic District	Homer Historic District	December 3, 1985 (#85003110)	Along Main St. and Silver Shoals Rd. 34°19′59″N 83°29′52″W	Homer	
9	Kesler Covered Bridge		June 18, 1975 (#75000571)	10 mi. N of Homer on County Line Rd. over Middle Fork Broad River; 34°25′27″N 83°23′16″W	Homer	Destroyed in 1978
10	Maysville Historic District	Maysville Historic District	September 12, 1985 (#85002203)	Along E. Main, W. Main and Homer Sts. 34°15′17″N 83°33′48″W	Maysville	
11	Mount Pleasant Historic District	Mount Pleasant Historic District	November 7, 1996 (#96001306)	Jct. of GA 51 and Damascus Road; 34°21′53″N 83°26′33″W	Homer	
12	Nails Creek Historic District	Nails Creek Historic District	November 7, 1996 (#96001307)	Jct. of GA 51 and GA 63; 34°22′00″N 83°24′02″W	Homer	
13	New Salem Covered Bridge		June 10, 1975 (#75000570)	6 mi. N of Commerce on SR S992 over Grove Creek; 34°15′30″N 83°25′20″W	Commerce	Collapsed
14	Turk Family Farm		January 8, 2003 (#03001365)	534 Carson Segars Rd. 34°17′37″N 83°32′43″W	Maysville	
