= List of U.S. municipalities in multiple counties =

This is a list of municipalities of all types (including cities, towns, and villages) in the United States that lie in more than one county (or, in the case of Louisiana, in more than one parish). As of August 15, 2025, there were 772 municipalities, cities, or towns in this list. Counties are listed in descending order of the county's share of the municipal population per the 2000 census. Since both cities and counties are subdivisions of the state and are structured by the state, many states prohibit cities from being present in more than one county via state law. The official list of multi-county municipalities comes from the 'Place by County' and 'County Subdivision' files of the U.S. Census Bureau for each state and territory.

== Alabama ==
Municipality	Type	Counties
Altoona	Town	Etowah, Blount
Arab	City	Marshall, Cullman
Argo	Town	St. Clair, Jefferson
Birmingham	City	Jefferson, Shelby
Boaz	City	Marshall, Etowah
Calera	City	Chilton, Shelby
Collinsville	City	DeKalb, Cherokee
County Line	Town	Blount, Jefferson
Decatur	City	Morgan, Limestone
Dothan	City	Houston, Dale, Henry
Enterprise	City	Coffee, Dale
Garden City	Town	Cullman, Blount
Glen Allen	Town	Fayette, Marion
Glencoe	City	Etowah, Calhoun
Gu-Win	Town	Fayette, Marion
Haleyville	City	Winston, Marion
Helena	City	Shelby, Jefferson
Hoover	City	Jefferson, Shelby
Huntsville	City	Madison, Limestone, Morgan, Marshall
Leeds	City	Jefferson, St. Clair, Shelby
Madison	City	Madison, Limestone
McKenzie	Town	Butler, Conecuh
Millbrook	City	Autauga, Elmore
Moundville	City	Hale, Tuscaloosa
Nauvoo	Town	Walker, Winston
Notasulga	Town	Macon, Lee
Oxford	City	Calhoun, Talladega, Cleburne
Phenix City	City	Russell, Lee
Piedmont	City	Calhoun, Cherokee
Prattville	City	Autauga, Elmore
Sand Rock	City	Cherokee, DeKalb
Sardis City	Town	Etowah, Marshall
Southside	City	Calhoun, Etowah
Sumiton	City	Walker, Jefferson
Tallassee	City	Elmore, Tallapoosa
Taylor	Town	Houston, Geneva
Trafford	Town	Jefferson, Blount
Trussville	City	Jefferson, St. Clair
Vance	Town	Tuscaloosa, Bibb
Vestavia Hills	City	Jefferson, Shelby
Vincent	City	Shelby, St. Clair, Talladega
Warrior	City	Blount, Jefferson
Waverly	Town	Chambers, Lee
Winfield	City	Marion, Fayette
Woodstock	Town	Bibb, Tuscaloosa

== Arizona ==
Municipality	Type	Counties
Apache Junction	City	Maricopa, Pinal
Hayden	Town	Gila, Pinal
Peoria	City	Maricopa, Yavapai
Marana	Town	Pima, Pinal
Queen Creek	Town	Maricopa, Pinal
Sedona	City	Yavapai, Coconino
Wickenburg	Town	Maricopa, Yavapai
Winkelman	Town	Gila, Pinal

== Arkansas ==
Municipality	Type	Counties
Alexander	Town	Pulaski, Saline
Alpena	Town	Boone, Carroll
Ash Flat	City	Sharp, Fulton
Big Flat	Town	Baxter, Searcy
Cave City	City	Independence, Sharp
Cherokee Village	City	Sharp, Fulton
Damascus	City	Van Buren, Faulkner
Elm Springs	City	Washington, Benton
Emmet	City	Nevada, Hempstead
Fairfield Bay	City	Van Buren, Cleburne
Glenwood	City	Pike, Montgomery
Hardy	City	Sharp, Fulton
Horseshoe Bend	City	Izard, Fulton, Sharp
Humphrey	City	Arkansas, Jefferson
Mansfield	City	Sebastian, Scott
Quitman	City	Cleburne, Faulkner
Springdale	City	Washington, Benton
Tillar	Town	Drew, Desha

== Colorado ==
City/Town	Counties
City of Arvada	Jefferson, Adams
City of Aurora	Arapahoe, Adams, Douglas
Town of Basalt	Eagle, Pitkin
Town of Bennett	Adams, Arapahoe
Town of Berthoud	Larimer, Weld
Town of Bow Mar	Arapahoe, Jefferson
City of Brighton	Adams, Weld
Town of Center	Rio Grande, Saguache
City of Central (Central City)	Gilpin, Clear Creek
Town of Erie	Boulder, Weld
Town of Green Mountain Falls	El Paso, Teller
Town of Johnstown	Weld, Larimer
City of Littleton	Arapahoe, Jefferson, Douglas
Town of Lochbuie	Weld, Adams
City of Longmont	Boulder, Weld
City of Northglenn	Adams, Weld
Town of Superior	Boulder, Jefferson
City of Thornton	Adams, Weld
City of Westminster	Adams, Jefferson
Town of Windsor	Weld, Larimer

== Delaware ==
City	Counties
Milford	Kent, Sussex
Smyrna	Kent, New Castle
Clayton	Kent, New Castle

== Florida ==
City/Town	Counties
Fanning Springs	Gilchrist, Levy
Flagler Beach	Flagler, Volusia
Longboat Key	Manatee, Sarasota
Marineland	Flagler, St. Johns

== Georgia ==
City	Counties
Allentown	Bleckley, Laurens, Twiggs, Wilkinson
Alto	Habersham, Banks
Atlanta	Fulton, DeKalb
Auburn	Barrow, Gwinnett
Austell	Cobb, Douglas
Baldwin	Habersham, Banks
Barwick	Brooks, Thomas
Braselton	Jackson, Gwinnett, Hall, Barrow
Braswell	Paulding, Polk
Bremen	Haralson, Carroll
Bogart	Oconee, Clarke
Buford	Gwinnett, Hall
College Park	Fulton, Clayton
Fort Oglethorpe	Catoosa, Walker
Gillsville	Hall, Banks
Haralson	Coweta, Meriwether
Loganville	Gwinnett, Walton
Lula	Hall, Banks
Manchester	Meriwether, Talbot
Maysville	Banks, Jackson
Mountain Park	Fulton, Cherokee
Nelson	Pickens, Cherokee
Palmetto	Fulton, Coweta
Pavo	Thomas, Brooks
Perry	Houston, Peach
Pine Mountain	Harris, Meriwether
Ray City	Berrien, Lanier
Rest Haven	Gwinnett, Hall
Social Circle	Walton, Newton
Tallulah Falls	Rabun, Habersham
Taylorsville	Bartow, Polk
Villa Rica	Douglas, Carroll
Warner Robins	Houston, Peach
West Point	Troup, Harris

== Idaho ==
City	Counties
Burley	Cassia, Minidoka
Kamiah	Idaho, Lewis
Pocatello	Bannock, Power
Star	Ada, Canyon

== Illinois ==
City	Counties
Algonquin	McHenry, Kane
Aurora	Kane, DuPage, Will, Kendall
Bartlett	DuPage, Cook, Kane
Barrington Hills	Cook, McHenry, Lake, Kane
Bolingbrook	Will, DuPage
Buffalo Grove	Lake, Cook
Burr Ridge	Cook, DuPage
Centralia	Clinton, Jefferson, Marion, Washington
Chicago	Cook, DuPage
Deerfield	Lake, Cook
East Dundee	Kane, Cook
Elgin	Kane, Cook
Elmhurst	DuPage, Cook
Hanover Park	Cook, DuPage
Hinsdale	DuPage, Cook
Joliet	Will, Kendall
Lemont	Cook, DuPage, Will
Millington	LaSalle, Kendall
Naperville	DuPage, Will
Plainfield	Kendall, Will
Reynolds	Rock Island, Mercer
Sandwich	DeKalb, Kendall
Somonauk	DeKalb, LaSalle
St. Charles	Kane, DuPage
Steger	Will, Cook
Streator	LaSalle, Livingston
Wayne	DuPage, Kane
Wheeling	Cook, Lake

== Indiana ==
Municipality	Type	Counties
Albany	town	Delaware, Randolph
Ashley	town	DeKalb, Steuben
Batesville	city	Ripley, Franklin
Chesterfield	town	Madison, Delaware
Converse	town	Miami, Grant
Cumberland	town	Marion, Hancock
Dunkirk	city	Jay, Blackford
Edinburgh	town	Johnson, Bartholomew, Shelby
Elwood	city	Madison, Tipton
Glenwood	town	Rush, Fayette
Hamilton	town	Steuben, DeKalb
Jamestown	town	Boone, Hendricks
Markle	town	Huntington, Wells
Milltown	town	Crawford, Harrison
Nappanee	city	Elkhart, Kosciusko
Otterbein	town	Benton, Tippecanoe
St. Paul	town	Decatur, Shelby
Shirley	town	Hancock, Henry
Wolcottville	town	LaGrange, Noble
Zanesville	town	Wells, Allen

== Iowa ==
City	Counties
Ackley	Hardin, Franklin
Adair	Guthrie, Adair
Barnes City	Mahaska, Poweshiek
Bevington	Warren, Madison
Carlisle	Polk, Warren
Cascade	Dubuque, Jones
Casey	Guthrie, Adair
Coon Rapids	Carroll, Guthrie
Coppock	Washington, Henry, Jefferson
Des Moines	Polk, Warren
Durant	Scott, Muscatine, Cedar
Dyersville	Dubuque, Delaware
Eddyville	Wapello, Mahaska, Monroe
Edgewood	Delaware, Clayton
Fairbank	Buchanan, Fayette
Gilmore City	Humboldt, Pocahontas
Janesville	Black Hawk, Bremer
Jesup	Black Hawk, Buchanan
Le Grand	Marshall, Tama
Lu Verne	Kossuth, Humboldt
Lytton	Calhoun, Sac
Mitchellville	Polk, Jasper
Norwalk	Polk, Warren
Ralston	Carroll, Greene
Sheldahl	Polk, Story, Boone
Shenandoah	Page, Fremont
Stanley	Buchanan, Fayette
Stuart	Guthrie, Adair
Victor	Poweshiek, Iowa
Walford	Linn, Benton
Weldon	Clarke, Decatur
West Des Moines	Polk, Dallas, Warren, Madison

== Kansas ==
City	Counties
Bonner Springs	Wyandotte, Johnson
Clayton	Norton, Decatur
Clifton	Washington, Clay
De Soto	Johnson, Leavenworth
Geuda Springs	Sumner, Cowley
Lake Quivira	Johnson, Wyandotte
Manhattan	Riley, Pottawatomie
Mulvane	Sedgwick, Sumner
Oakley	Logan, Gove, Thomas
Sabetha	Nemaha, Brown
Sedgwick	Harvey, Sedgwick
Spring Hill	Johnson, Miami
Solomon	Dickinson, Saline
Vining	Clay, Washington
Willard	Shawnee, Wabaunsee

== Kentucky ==
City	Counties
Corbin	Whitley, Knox, Laurel
Dawson Springs	Hopkins, Caldwell
Eubank	Pulaski, Lincoln
Germantown	Bracken, Mason
Pleasureville	Henry, Shelby
Prospect	Jefferson, Oldham
Sardis	Mason, Robertson
Sparta	Gallatin, Owen
Upton	Hardin, LaRue
Vine Grove	Hardin, Meade
Walton	Boone, Kenton
Williamstown	Grant, Pendleton

== Louisiana ==
City/Town	Parishes
Duson	Lafayette, Acadia
Delcambre	Vermilion, Iberia

== Maryland ==
City	Counties
Mount Airy	Carroll, Frederick
Millington	Kent, Queen Anne's
Queen Anne	Queen Anne's, Talbot
Templeville	Caroline, Queen Anne's

== Michigan ==
Municipality	Type	Counties
Battle Creek	city	Calhoun, Barry
Brown City	city	Lapeer, Sanilac
Casnovia	village	Kent, Muskegon
Cement City	village	Lenawee, Jackson
Clare	city	Clare, Isabella
East Lansing	city	Ingham, Clinton
Fenton	city	Genesee, Livingston, Oakland
Flat Rock	city	Monroe, Wayne
Grand Ledge	city	Eaton, Clinton
Grosse Pointe Shores	city	Wayne, Macomb
Hesperia	village	Oceana, Newaygo
Hillman	village	Montmorency, Alpena
Holland	city	Ottawa, Allegan
Hubbardston	village	Ionia, Clinton
Lansing	city	Ingham, Eaton, Clinton
Lennon	village	Shiawassee, Genesee
Mackinaw City	village	Emmet, Cheboygan
Memphis	city	Macomb, St. Clair
Midland	city	Midland, Bay
Milan	city	Monroe, Washtenaw
Niles	city	Berrien, Cass
Northville	city	Oakland, Wayne
Otter Lake	village	Lapeer, Genesee
Ovid	village	Clinton, Shiawassee
Reese	village	Saginaw, Tuscola
Richmond	city	Macomb, St. Clair
South Haven	city	Van Buren, Allegan
Traverse City	city	Grand Traverse, Leelanau
Union City	village	Branch, Calhoun

== Minnesota ==
City	Counties
Blaine	Anoka, Ramsey
Bellechester	Goodhue, Wabasha
Blooming Prairie	Steele, Dodge
Braham	Isanti, Kanabec
Brooten	Stearns, Pope
Chanhassen	Carver, Hennepin
Chatfield	Fillmore, Olmsted
Clearwater	Wright, Stearns
Comfrey	Brown, Cottonwood
Dayton	Hennepin, Wright
Dennison	Goodhue, Rice
Eden Valley	Meeker, Stearns
Elysian	Waseca, Le Sueur
Granite Falls	Yellow Medicine, Chippewa
Hanover	Wright, Hennepin
Hastings	Dakota, Washington
Jasper	Pipestone, Rock
La Crescent	Houston, Winona
Lake City	Wabasha, Goodhue
Le Sueur	Le Sueur, Sibley
Mankato	Blue Earth, Le Sueur, Nicollet
Minneiska	Wabasha, Winona
Minnesota Lake	Faribault, Blue Earth
Motley	Morrison, Cass
New Prague	Scott, Le Sueur
Northfield	Rice, Dakota
North Mankato	Nicollet, Blue Earth
Ormsby	Martin, Watonwan
Osakis	Douglas, Todd
Pine Island	Goodhue, Olmsted
Princeton	Mille Lacs, Sherburne
Raymond	Chippewa, Kandiyohi
Rockford	Wright, Hennepin
Roosevelt	Roseau, Lake of the Woods
Rothsay	Otter Tail, Wilkin
Royalton	Morrison, Benton
Sartell	Stearns, Benton
Spring Lake Park	Anoka, Ramsey
Staples	Todd, Wadena
St. Anthony	Hennepin, Ramsey
St. Cloud	Stearns, Benton, Sherburne
St. Francis	Anoka, Isanti
Swanville	Morrison, Todd
Wadena	Otter Tail, Wadena
White Bear Lake	Ramsey, Washington

== Mississippi ==
City	Counties
Baldwyn	Prentiss, Lee
Centreville	Wilkinson, Amite
Crenshaw	Panola, Quitman
Crowder	Quitman, Panola
Crosby	Amite, Wilkinson
Hattiesburg	Forrest, Lamar
Jackson	Hinds, Madison, Rankin
Lake	Scott, Newton
Lumberton	Lamar, Pearl River
Maben	Oktibbeha, Webster
Mathiston	Webster, Choctaw
Nettleton	Monroe, Lee
Shaw	Bolivar, Sunflower
Sherman	Pontotoc, Union, Lee
State Line	Greene, Wayne
Union	Newton, Neshoba

== Missouri ==
City	Counties
Belle	Maries, Osage
Browning	Linn, Sullivan
Cameron	Clinton, DeKalb, Caldwell
Cape Girardeau	Cape Girardeau, Scott
Drexel	Bates, Cass
Eureka	Jefferson, St. Louis
Excelsior Springs	Clay, Ray
Fenton	St. Louis, Jefferson
Foristell	St. Charles County, Warren
Hannibal	Marion, Ralls
Jefferson City	Cole, Callaway,
Joplin	Jasper, Newton
Kansas City	Jackson, Clay, Platte, Cass
Lake Ozark	Camden, Miller
Lee's Summit	Cass, Jackson
Monett	Barry, Lawrence
Pacific	Franklin, St. Louis County
Portageville	New Madrid, Pemiscot
Republic	Christian, Greene
Rogersville	Christian, Greene, Webster
Sugar Creek	Clay, Jackson
Sullivan	Crawford, Franklin
Valles Mines	Jefferson, St. Francois

== Nebraska ==
City	Counties
Emerson	Dixon, Dakota, Thurston
Halsey	Thomas, Blaine
Newman Grove	Madison, Platte
Oxford	Furnas, Harlan
Palisade	Hitchcock, Hayes
Shelton	Buffalo, Hall
Tilden	Madison, Antelope
Trumbull	Clay, Adams
Wakefield	Dixon, Wayne

== New York ==
Municipality	Type	Counties
Almond	Village	Allegany, Steuben
Attica	Village	Wyoming, Genesee
Deposit	Village	Broome, Delaware
Dolgeville	Village	Herkimer, Fulton
Earlville	Village	Madison, Chenango
Fort Plain	Village	Herkimer, Montgomery
Geneva	City	Ontario, Seneca
Gowanda	Village	Cattaraugus, Erie
New York City	City	Kings, Queens, New York, Bronx, Richmond
Rushville	Village	Yates, Ontario
Saranac Lake	Village	Essex, Franklin

== North Carolina ==
City	Counties
Cary	Wake, Chatham
Chapel Hill	Orange, Durham
Clayton	Johnston, Wake
Davidson	Mecklenburg, Iredell
Durham	Durham, Wake. Orange
Elizabeth City	Pasquotank, Camden
Falcon	Cumberland, Sampson
Gibsonville	Guilford, Alamance
Grifton	Lenoir, Pitt
Hickory	Catawba, Burke, Caldwell
High Point	Guilford, Davidson, Forsyth, Randolph
Kannapolis	Cabarrus, Rowan
Long View	Catawba, Burke
Raleigh	Wake, Durham
Rocky Mount	Edgecombe, Nash
Sanford	Lee, Harnett
Seven Devils	Watauga, Avery
Stokesdale	Guilford, Rockingham, Forsyth, Stokes
Surf City	Onslow, Pender

== North Dakota ==
City	Counties
Wilton	McLean, Burleigh
Reynolds	Grand Forks, Traill
Tower City	Cass, Barnes
Grandin	Traill, Cass
Enderlin	Ransom, Cass
Lehr	Logan, McIntosh
Agate	Rolette, Towner

== Ohio ==
The following table does not include townships. Ohio is the only state that allows a township to exist in multiple counties, but a township is not considered a municipality. Examples of multi-county townships include Fairfield Township, Columbiana County, and Washington Township, Franklin County.

City	Counties
Adena	Jefferson, Harrison
Alliance	Stark, Mahoning
Baltic	Tuscarawas, Holmes, Coshocton
Bellevue	Sandusky, Huron, Erie, Seneca
Blanchester	Clinton, Warren
Bluffton	Allen, Hancock
Bradford	Miami, Darke
Buchtel	Athens, Hocking
Buckeye Lake	Licking, Fairfield
Burkettsville	Mercer, Darke
Canal Winchester	Franklin, Fairfield
Carlisle	Montgomery, Warren
Centerville	Montgomery, Greene
Clifton	Greene, Clark
College Corner	Preble, Butler
Columbus	Franklin, Delaware, Fairfield
Columbiana	Columbiana, Mahoning
Crestline	Crawford, Richland
Creston	Wayne, Medina
Dayton	Montgomery, Greene
Delphos	Allen, Van Wert
Dublin	Franklin, Delaware, Union, Madison
Elmore	Ottawa, Sandusky
Fairfield	Hamilton, Butler
Fostoria	Seneca, Hancock, Wood
Galion	Crawford, Morrow, Richland
Gratiot	Licking, Muskingum
Green Springs	Seneca, Sandusky
Harrisburg	Franklin, Pickaway
Harveysburg	Warren, Clinton
Huber Heights	Montgomery, Miami
Hunting Valley	Cuyahoga, Geauga
Kettering	Montgomery, Greene
Lithopolis	Fairfield, Franklin
Lockbourne	Franklin, Pickaway
Loudonville	Ashland, Holmes
Loveland	Clermont, Hamilton, Warren
Lynchburg	Highland, Clinton
Magnolia	Stark, Carroll
Middletown	Butler, Warren
Milan	Erie, Huron
Milford	Hamilton, Clermont
Minerva	Stark, Carroll, Columbiana
Minster	Auglaize, Shelby
Mogadore	Summit, Portage
Monroe	Butler, Warren
New Holland	Pickaway, Fayette
Pickerington	Fairfield, Franklin
Plain City	Madison, Union
Plymouth	Richland, Huron
Reynoldsburg	Franklin, Licking, Fairfield
Ridgeway	Hardin, Logan
Rittman	Wayne, Medina
Roseville	Perry, Muskingum
Scott	Van Wert, Paulding
Sharonville	Hamilton, Butler
Springboro	Warren, Montgomery
Swanton	Fulton, Lucas
Tallmadge	Summit, Portage
Union	Montgomery, Miami
Utica	Licking, Knox
Vermilion	Lorain, Erie
Verona	Preble, Montgomery
Washingtonville	Columbiana, Mahoning
Westerville	Franklin, Delaware
Wilson	Monroe, Belmont
Yorkville	Jefferson, Belmont
Youngstown	Mahoning, Trumbull

== Oklahoma ==
City	Counties
Allen	Pontotoc, Hughes
Bartlesville	Washington, Osage
Bixby	Tulsa, Wagoner
Blanchard	McClain, Grady
Broken Arrow	Tulsa, Wagoner
Bromide	Johnston, Coal
Cashion	Kingfisher, Logan
Catoosa	Rogers, Wagoner
Chattanooga	Comanche, Tillman
Clinton	Custer, Washita
Collinsville	Tulsa, Rogers
Davis	Murray, Garvin
Drumright	Creek, Payne
Fair Oaks	Wagoner, Rogers
Fanshawe	LeFlore, Latimer
Fort Gibson	Muskogee, Cherokee
Geary	Blaine, Canadian
Hammon	Roger Mills, Custer
Hydro	Caddo, Blaine
Liberty	Tulsa, Okmulgee
Maud	Pottawatomie, Seminole
Mulhall	Logan, Payne
Oaks	Delaware, Cherokee
Okarche	Canadian, Kingfisher
Oklahoma City	Oklahoma, Cleveland, Canadian, Pottawatomie
Orlando	Logan, Payne
Owasso	Tulsa, Rogers
Piedmont	Canadian, Kingfisher
Ponca City	Kay, Osage
Purcell	McClain, Cleveland
Sand Springs	Tulsa, Osage
Sapulpa	Creek, Tulsa
Skiatook	Osage, Tulsa
Stroud	Lincoln, Creek
Sweetwater	Beckham, Roger Mills
Tulsa	Tulsa, Osage, Rogers, Wagoner

== Oregon ==
City	Counties
Albany	Linn, Benton
Gates	Linn, Marion
Idanha	Linn, Marion
Lake Oswego	Clackamas, Multnomah, Washington
Mill City	Linn, Marion
Milwaukie	Multnomah, Clackamas
Portland	Multnomah, Clackamas, Washington
Rivergrove	Clackamas, Washington
Salem	Marion, Polk
Tualatin	Clackamas, Washington
Willamina	Yamhill, Polk
Wilsonville	Clackamas, Washington

== Pennsylvania ==
City	Counties
Adamstown	Berks, Lancaster
Ashland	Schuylkill, Columbia
Bethlehem	Lehigh, Northampton
Bryn Mawr	Delaware, Montgomery
Ellwood City	Beaver, Lawrence
Emlenton	Venango, Clarion
Falls Creek	Jefferson, Clearfield
McDonald	Washington, Allegheny
Seven Springs	Fayette, Somerset
Shippensburg	Cumberland, Franklin
Telford	Bucks, Montgomery
Trafford	Westmoreland, Allegheny
Tunnelhill	Cambria, Blair

== South Carolina ==
City	Counties
Andrews	Georgetown, Williamsburg
Batesburg-Leesville	Lexington, Saluda
Cayce	Lexington, Richland
Charleston	Charleston, Berkeley
Clemson	Pickens, Anderson
Columbia	Richland, Lexington
Fountain Inn	Greenville, Laurens
Greer	Greenville, Spartanburg
Hardeeville	Beaufort, Jasper
Murrells Inlet	Georgetown, Horry
North Charleston	Charleston, Dorchester
North Augusta	Aiken, Edgefield
Piedmont	Anderson, Greenville

== South Dakota ==
City	Counties
Arlington	Kingsbury, Brookings
Beresford	Union, Lincoln
Box Elder	Pennington, Meade
Eagle Butte	Dewey, Ziebach
Irene	Turner, Clay, Yankton
Iroquois	Kingsbury, Beadle
Sioux Falls	Minnehaha, Lincoln
Wessington	Beadle, Hand

== Tennessee ==
City	Counties
Adamsville	McNairy, Hardin
Enville	Chester, McNairy
Farragut	Knox, Loudon
Goodlettsville	Sumner, Davidson
Grand Junction	Fayette, Hardeman
Greenbrier	Robertson, Sumner
Humboldt	Gibson, Madison
Iron City	Lawrence, Wayne
Johnson City	Washington, Carter, Sullivan
Kenton	Obion, Gibson
Kingsport	Sullivan, Hawkins
McKenzie	Carroll, Henry, Weakley
Milledgeville	Chester, Hardin, McNairy
Millersville	Sumner, Robertson
Monteagle	Grundy, Marion, Franklin
Morristown	Hamblen, Jefferson
Oak Ridge	Anderson, Roane
Oliver Springs	Anderson, Roane, Morgan
Petersburg	Lincoln, Marshall
Portland	Sumner, Robertson
Ridgetop	Davidson, Robertson
Rocky Top	Anderson, Campbell
Scotts Hill	Decatur, Henderson
Silerton	Chester, Hardeman
Smyrna	Rutherford, Williamson
Spring Hill	Williamson, Maury
Sweetwater	Monroe, McMinn
Trimble	Dyer, Obion
Tullahoma	Coffee, Franklin
Vonore	Monroe, Blount
Watauga	Carter, Washington
White House	Robertson, Sumner
White Pine	Jefferson, Hamblen

== Texas ==
City	Counties
Abernathy	Hale, Lubbock
Abilene	Taylor, Jones
Ackerly	Dawson, Martin
Amarillo	Potter, Randall
Aransas Pass	Aransas, Nueces, San Patricio
Austin	Travis, Williamson, Hays
Azle	Tarrant, Parker
Bartlett	Bell, Williamson
Baytown	Harris, Chambers
Blackwell	Coke, Nolan
Bruceville-Eddy	Falls, McLennan
Bullard	Cherokee, Smith
Burleson	Johnson, Tarrant
Carrollton	Dallas, Denton, Collin
Cedar Hill	Dallas, Ellis
Cedar Park	Williamson, Travis
Celina	Collin, Denton
Cibolo	Bexar, Guadalupe
Clarksville City	Gregg, Upshur
Cleveland	Liberty, Montgomery
Combine	Dallas, Kaufman
Coppell	Dallas, Denton
Copperas Cove	Bell, Coryell, Lampasas
Corpus Christi	Nueces, Aransas, Kleberg, San Patricio
Cresson	Hood, Johnson, Parker
Crowley	Tarrant, Johnson
Dallas	Dallas, Collin, Denton, Kaufman (water only), Rockwall (water only)
Dalhart	Dallam, Hartley
Denver City	Gaines, Yoakum
East Mountain	Gregg, Upshur
Easton	Gregg, Rusk
Elgin	Bastrop, Travis
Evant	Coryell, Hamilton
Fair Oaks Ranch	Bexar, Comal, Kendall
Ferris	Ellis, Dallas
Flower Mound	Denton, Tarrant
Fort Worth	Tarrant, Johnson, Parker, Wise, Denton,
Friendswood	Galveston, Harris
Frisco	Collin, Denton
Fritch	Hutchinson, Moore
Garland	Dallas, Rockwall, Collin
Gladewater	Gregg, Upshur
Glenn Heights	Dallas, Ellis
Golinda	Falls, McLennan
Grand Prairie	Tarrant, Dallas, Ellis, Johnson
Grapevine	Tarrant, Dallas, Denton
Hamlin	Fisher, Jones
Haslet	Tarrant, Denton
Heath	Kaufman, Rockwall
Hebron	Denton, Collin
Horseshoe Bay	Burnet, Llano
Houston	Harris, Fort Bend, Montgomery
Hughes Springs	Cass, Morris
Josephine	Collin, Hunt
Katy	Harris, Fort Bend, Waller
Kilgore	Gregg, Rusk
League City	Galveston, Harris
Leander	Williamson, Travis
Lewisville	Denton, Dallas
Longview	Gregg, Harrison
Lueders	Jones, Shackelford
Lytle	Atascosa, Bexar, Medina
Mabank	Henderson, Kaufman
Mansfield	Tarrant, Ellis, Johnson
McGregor	Coryell, McLennan
Mesquite	Dallas, Kaufman
Missouri City	Fort Bend, Harris
Mont Belvieu	Chambers, Liberty
Mustang Ridge	Travis, Bastrop, Caldwell
Navasota	Brazos, Grimes
New Braunfels	Comal, Guadalupe
Newark	Tarrant, Wise
Niederwald	Hays, Caldwell
Nixon	Gonzales, Wilson
O'Donnell	Dawson, Lynn
Oakwood	Freestone, Leon
Odessa	Ector, Midland
Old River-Winfree	Chambers, Liberty
Ovilla	Ellis, Dallas
Pearland	Brazoria, Fort Bend, Harris
Pecan Gap	Delta, Fannin
Pernitas Point	Jim Wells, Live Oak
Plano	Collin, Denton
Plfugerville	Travis, Williamson
Port Arthur	Jefferson, Orange (water only)
Prosper	Collin, Denton
Reklaw	Cherokee, Rusk
Reno	Parker, Tarrant
Richardson	Dallas, Collin
Roanoke	Denton, Tarrant
Round Rock	Williamson, Travis
Rowlett	Dallas, Rockwall
Royse City	Rockwall, Collin, Hunt
Sachse	Dallas, Collin
San Antonio	Bexar, Medina
San Diego	Duval, Jim Wells
San Marcos	Hays, Caldwell, Guadalupe
Schertz	Bexar, Comal, Guadalupe
Seabrook	Harris, Chambers (water area only)
Seagoville	Dallas, Kaufman
Seven Points	Henderson, Kaufman
Shoreacres	Chambers, Harris (water area only)
Selma	Bexar, Comal, Guadalupe
Southlake	Tarrant, Denton
Stafford	Fort Bend, Harris
Stamford	Haskell, Jones
Streetman	Freestone, Navarro
Thorndale	Milam, Williamson
Trophy Club	Denton, Tarrant
Troup	Cherokee, Smith
Uhland	Hays, Caldwell
Universal City	Bexar, Guadalupe
Valley Mills	Bosque, McLennan
Van Alstyne	Grayson, Collin
Venus	Ellis, Johnson
Waller	Waller, Harris
Warren City	Gregg, Upshur
Westlake	Tarrant, Denton
Whitewright	Fannin, Grayson
Windthorst	Archer, Clay
Winnsboro	Franklin, Wood
Wylie	Collin, Dallas, Rockwall
Yoakum	DeWitt, Lavaca

== Utah ==
City	Counties
Bluffdale	Salt Lake, Utah
Draper	Salt Lake, Utah
Hooper	Davis, Weber
Park City	Summit, Wasatch
Santaquin	Utah, Juab

== Virginia ==
Virginia cities are all independent cities and are not located in any county, but several incorporated towns are located in multiple counties.

Town	Counties
Belle Haven	Accomack, Northampton
Brodnax	Brunswick, Mecklenburg
Farmville	Prince Edward, Cumberland
Gordonsville	Orange, Louisa
Grottoes	Augusta, Rockingham
Jarratt	Greensville, Sussex
Kilmarnock	Lancaster, Northumberland
Pamplin City	Appomattox, Prince Edward
Saltville	Smyth, Washington
Scottsville	Albemarle, Buckingham
St. Paul	Wise, Russell

== Washington ==
City	Counties
Auburn	King, Pierce
Bothell	King, Snohomish
Coulee Dam	Douglas, Grant, Okanogan
Milton	King, Pierce
Pacific	King, Pierce
Woodland	Clark, Cowlitz

== West Virginia ==
City	Counties
Huntington	Cabell, Wayne
Montgomery	Fayette, Kanawha
Nitro	Kanawha, Putnam
Paden City	Tyler, Wetzel
Smithers	Fayette, Kanawha
Weirton	Hancock, Brooke
Wheeling	Ohio, Marshall

== Wisconsin ==
City	Counties
Abbotsford	Clark, Marathon
Appleton	Outagamie, Calumet, Winnebago
Ashland	Ashland, Bayfield
Berlin	Green Lake, Waushara
Brodhead	Green, Rock
Brooklyn	Dane, Green
Burlington	Racine, Walworth
Colby	Clark, Marathon
Columbus	Columbia, Dodge
Cuba City	Grant, Lafayette
Eau Claire	Eau Claire, Chippewa
Edgerton	Rock, Dane
Hartford	Washington, Dodge
Kaukauna	Calumet, Outagamie
Kiel	Manitowoc, Calumet
Marion	Waupaca, Shawano
Marshfield	Wood, Marathon
Menasha	Winnebago, Calumet
Milwaukee	Milwaukee, Washington, Waukesha
New London	Waupaca, Outagamie
River Falls	Pierce, St. Croix
Stanley	Chippewa, Clark
Watertown	Jefferson, Dodge
Waupun	Dodge, Fond du Lac
Whitewater	Walworth, Jefferson
Wisconsin Dells	Columbia, Sauk, Adams, Juneau

== Wyoming ==
City	Counties
Frannie	Big Horn, Park
