= Maysville Historic District (Maysville, Georgia) =

Historic district in Georgia, United States

- U.S. National Register of Historic Places
- U.S. Historic district
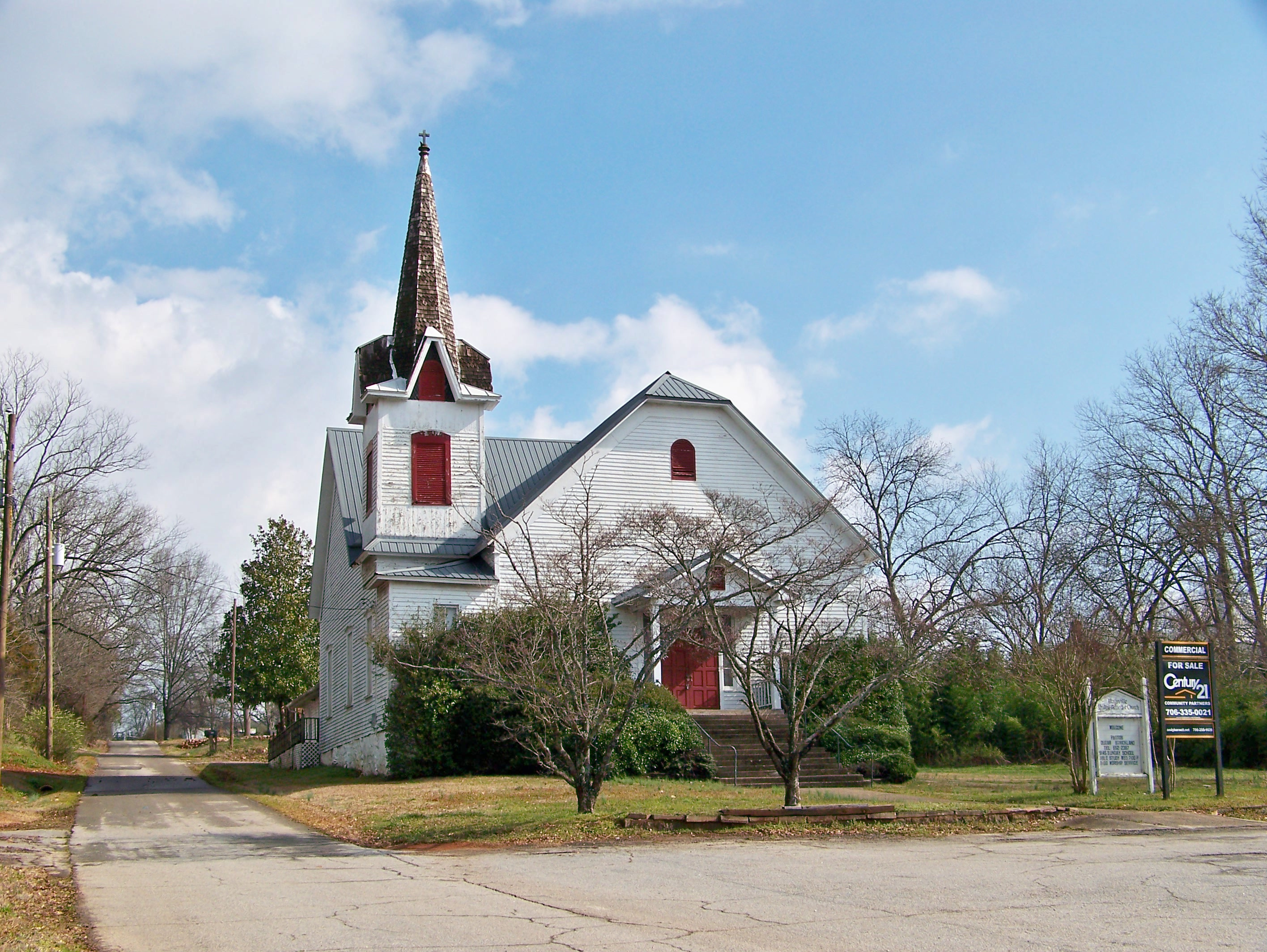

- Location within Georgia
- Location: Along E. Main, W. Main and Homer Sts., Maysville, Georgia
- Coordinates: 34°15′17″N 83°33′48″W
- Area: 170 acres (69 ha)
- Built by: Multiple
- Architectural style: Greek Revival, Late Victorian, Eclectic
- NRHP reference No.: 85002203
- Added to NRHP: September 12, 1985

The Maysville Historic District in Maysville, Georgia is a 170 acres (69 ha) historic district which was listed on the National Register of Historic Places in 1985.

It runs along E. Main, W. Main and Homer Streets, and included 194 contributing buildings and one contributing site.

It includes Greek Revival, Late Victorian, and Eclectic architecture.

It spans Banks and Jackson counties.
