= Banks County High School =

Public school in Georgia, United States

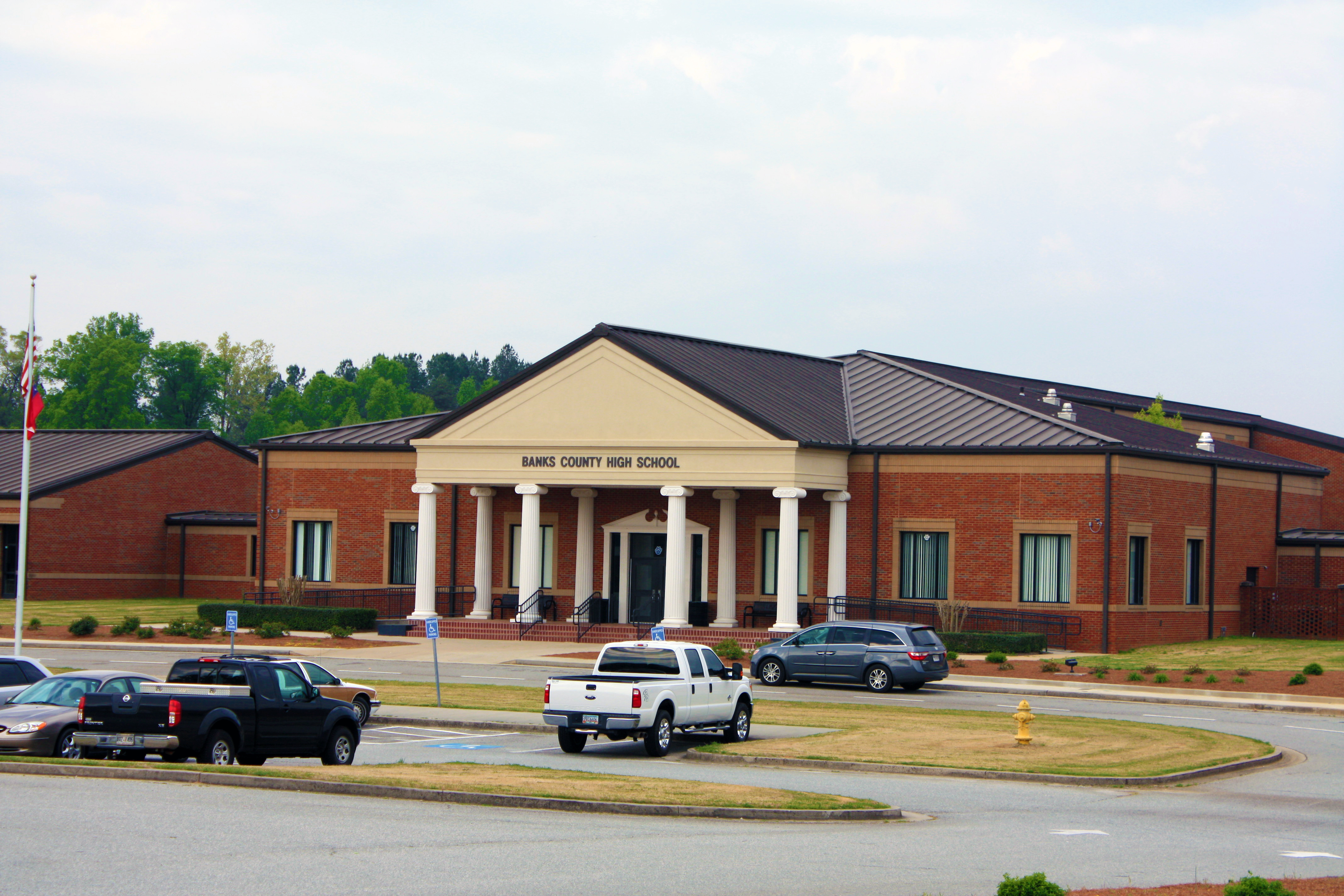

Location
- 1486-A Historic Homer Highway; Homer, Banks, Georgia 30547; United States
- Coordinates: 32°27′47″N 83°29′11″W

Information
- School type: Public
- School district: Banks County School District
- CEEB code: 111640
- Principal: Christine Bray
- Teaching staff: 63.60 FTE
- Grades: 9–12
- Enrollment: 859 (2023–2024)
- Average class size: 30
- Student to teacher ratio: 13.51
- Colors: Blue and white
- Slogan: Seize the Opportunity to Win the Day.
- Athletics: Marching band, baseball, softball, wrestling, football, track, cross country, tennis, golf, basketball, and soccer
- Mascot: African Leopard
- Team name: Leopards
- Website: bchs.banks.k12.ga.us

Banks County High School is a public co-educational high school located in Homer, in the mountains of northern Georgia, United States. The school enrolls about 928 students in grades 9–12.

== School district ==
The school serves all of Banks County, and is part of the Banks County School District. In addition to all of Homer, the district also includes Banks County sections of Alto, Baldwin, Gillsville, Lula, and Maysville.

The school is fed with students from Banks County Middle School, also in Homer.

== Extracurricular activities ==
One of the largest clubs is the Banks County chapter of the National FFA Organization, which teaches students about various Career Development Events (CDEs), including electrical safety, in which a Banks County student won a state competition in 2014.
