= Gillsville Historic District =

Historic district in Georgia, United States

- U.S. National Register of Historic Places
- U.S. Historic district
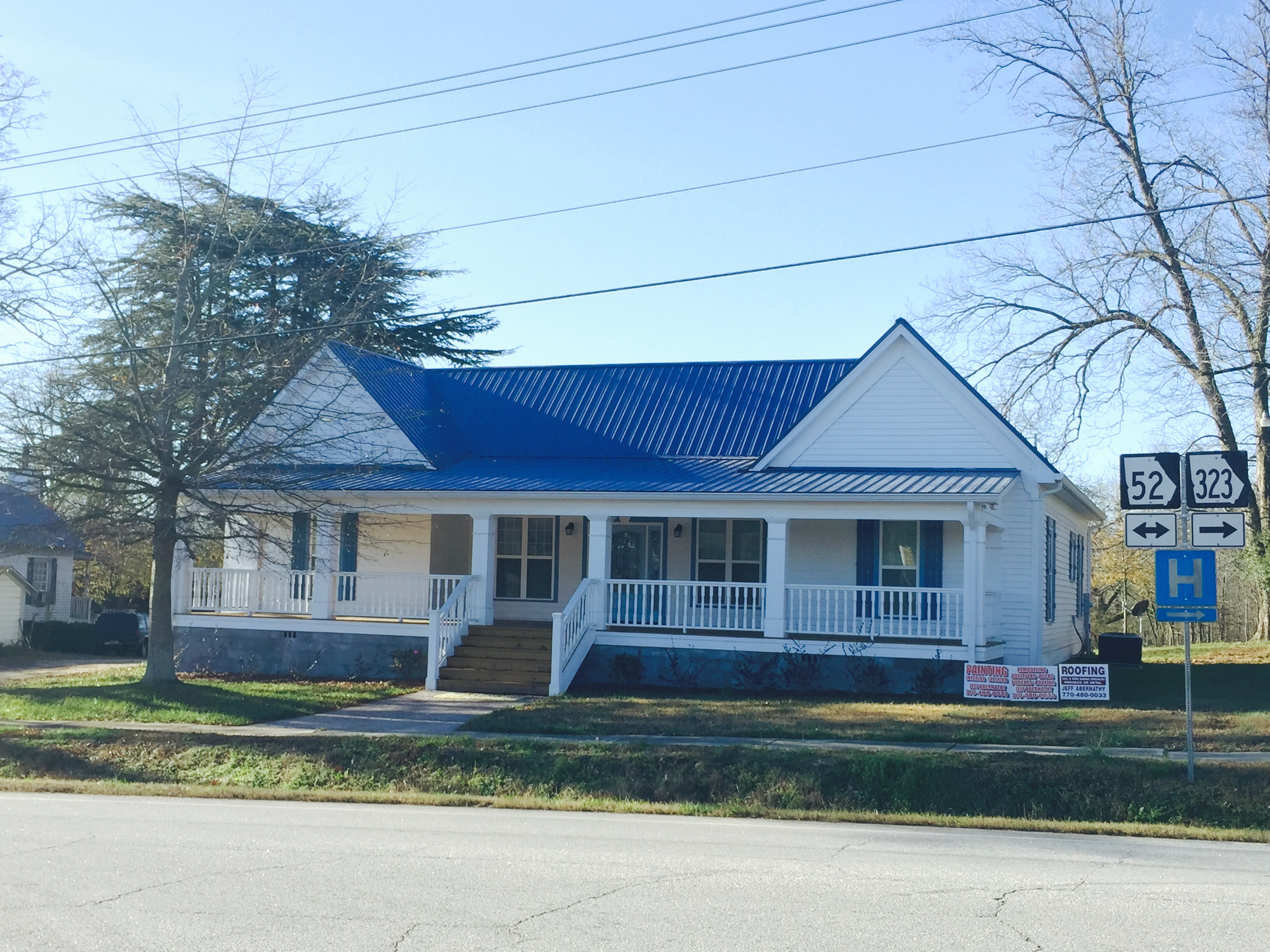

- Location within Georgia
- Location: GA 52, Gillsville, Georgia
- Coordinates: 34°18′38″N 83°38′20″W
- Area: 54 acres (22 ha)
- Built by: Multiple
- Architect: Multiple
- Architectural style: Late Victorian
- NRHP reference No.: 85001933
- Added to NRHP: August 30, 1985

The Gillsville Historic District is a 54 acres (22 ha) historic district in Gillsville, Georgia which was listed on the National Register of Historic Places in 1985. The listing included 25 contributing buildings and a contributing structure.

It is a linear historic district along Georgia Route 52 and the railroad, in the small town of Gillsville, running across the border of western Banks County and eastern Hall County.
