= Banks County School District =

School district in Georgia (U.S. state)

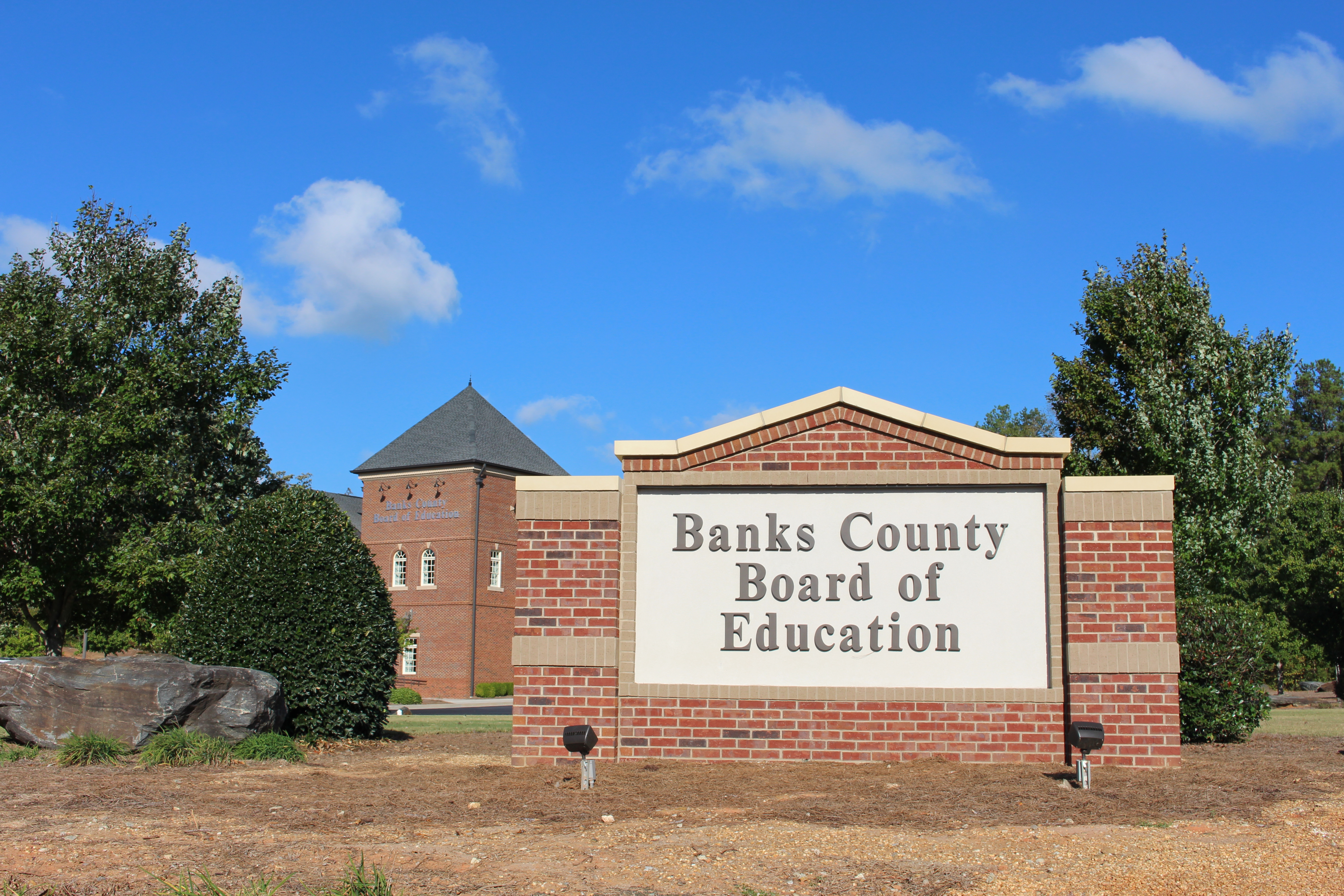

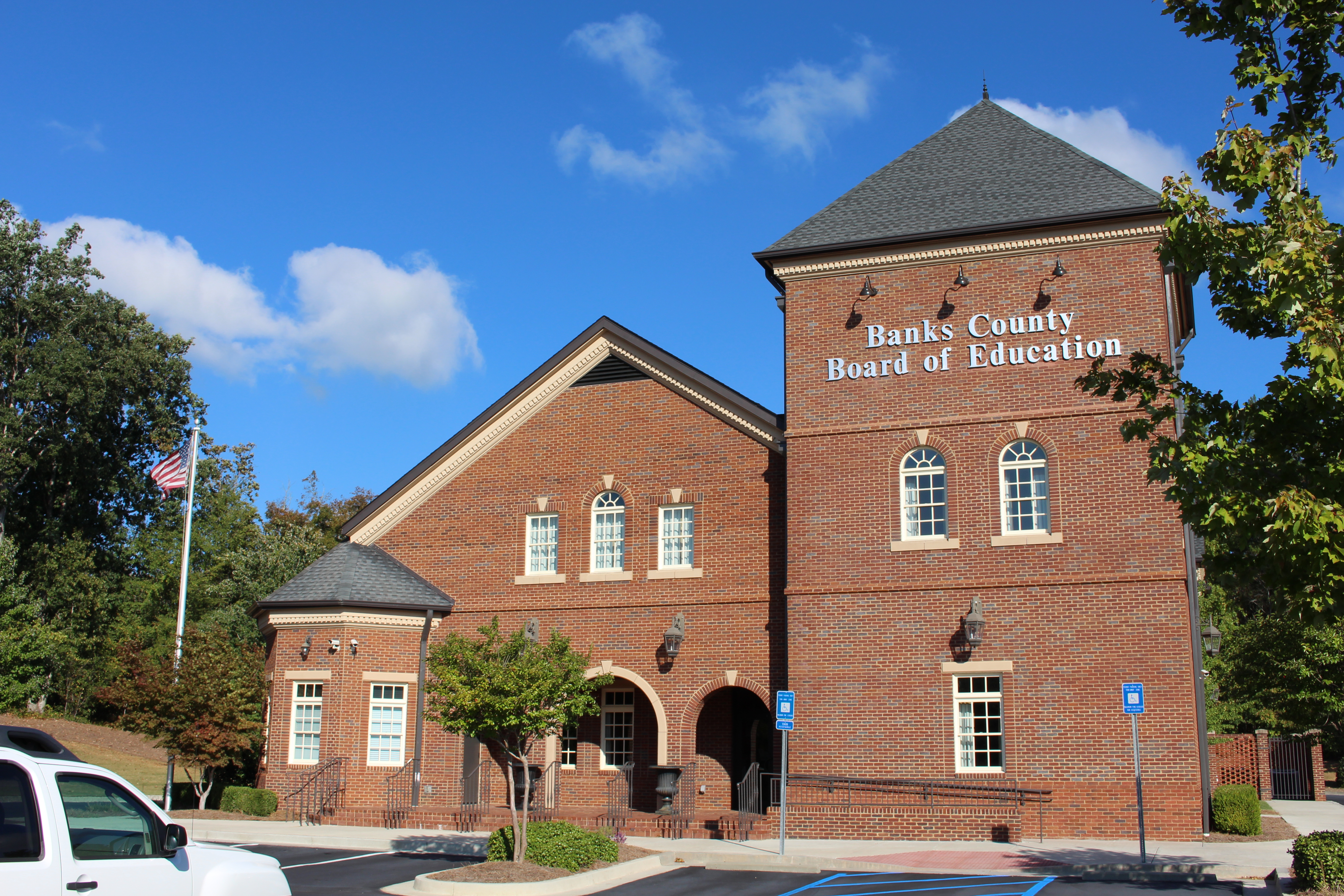

Address
- 1989 Historic Homer Highway Homer, (Banks County), Georgia, 30529; United States
- Coordinates: 34.2981°N 83.4756°W

District information
- Grades: Pre-school - 12
- Superintendent: Stan Davis

Students and staff
- Enrollment: 2,428
- Faculty: 150

Other information
- Accreditation: Southern Association of Colleges and Schools, Georgia Accrediting Commission
- Fax: (706) 677-2223
- Website: www.banks.k12.ga.us

The Banks County School District is a public school district in Banks County, Georgia, United States, based in Homer.

It includes all of Banks County. In addition to all of Homer, the district also includes Banks County sections of Alto, Baldwin, Gillsville, Lula, and Maysville. There are four schools in the district, which educate 2,788 students in kindergarten through 12th grade.

== Schools ==
The Banks County School District has two elementary schools, one middle school, and one high school.

Banks County schools
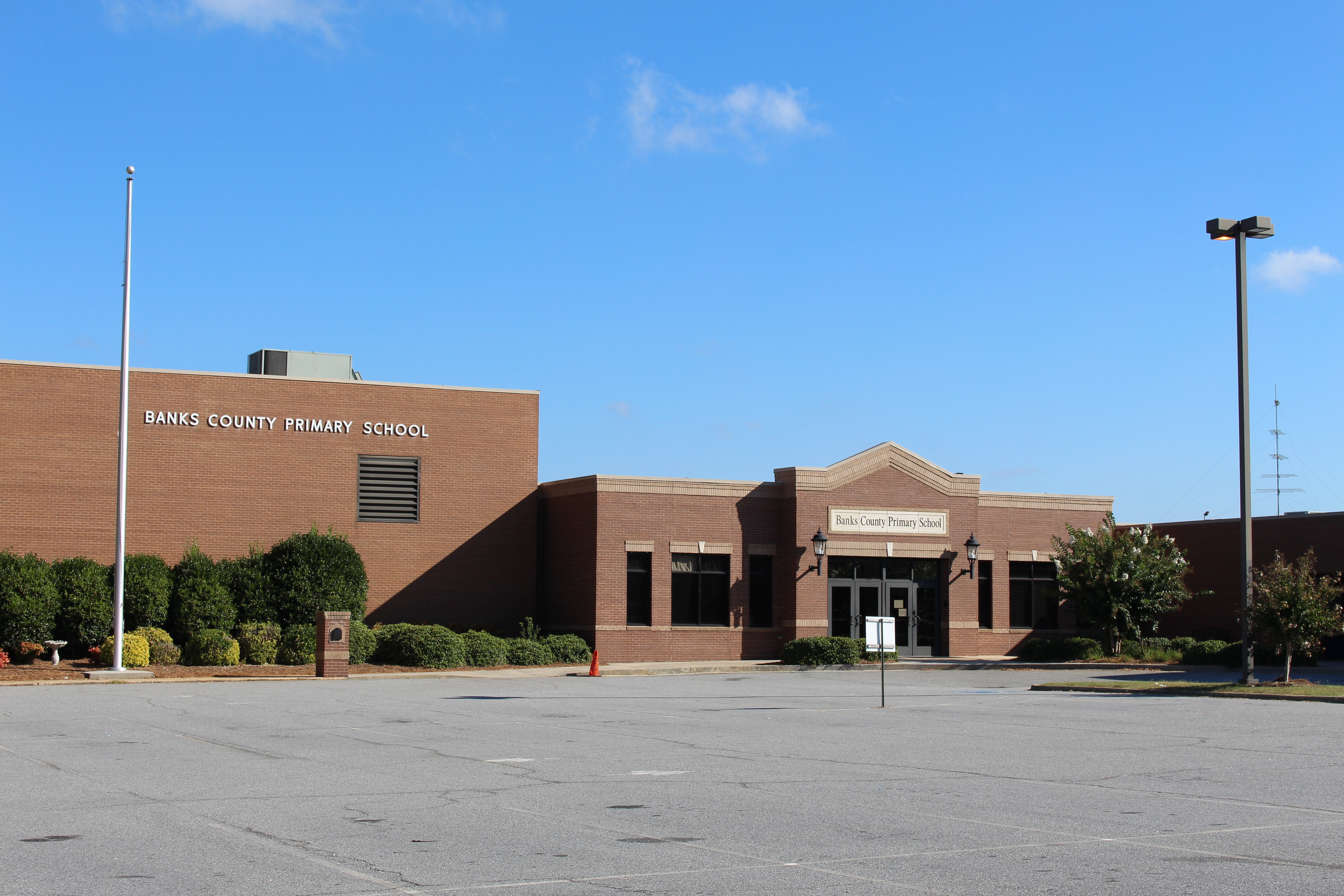
Banks County Primary

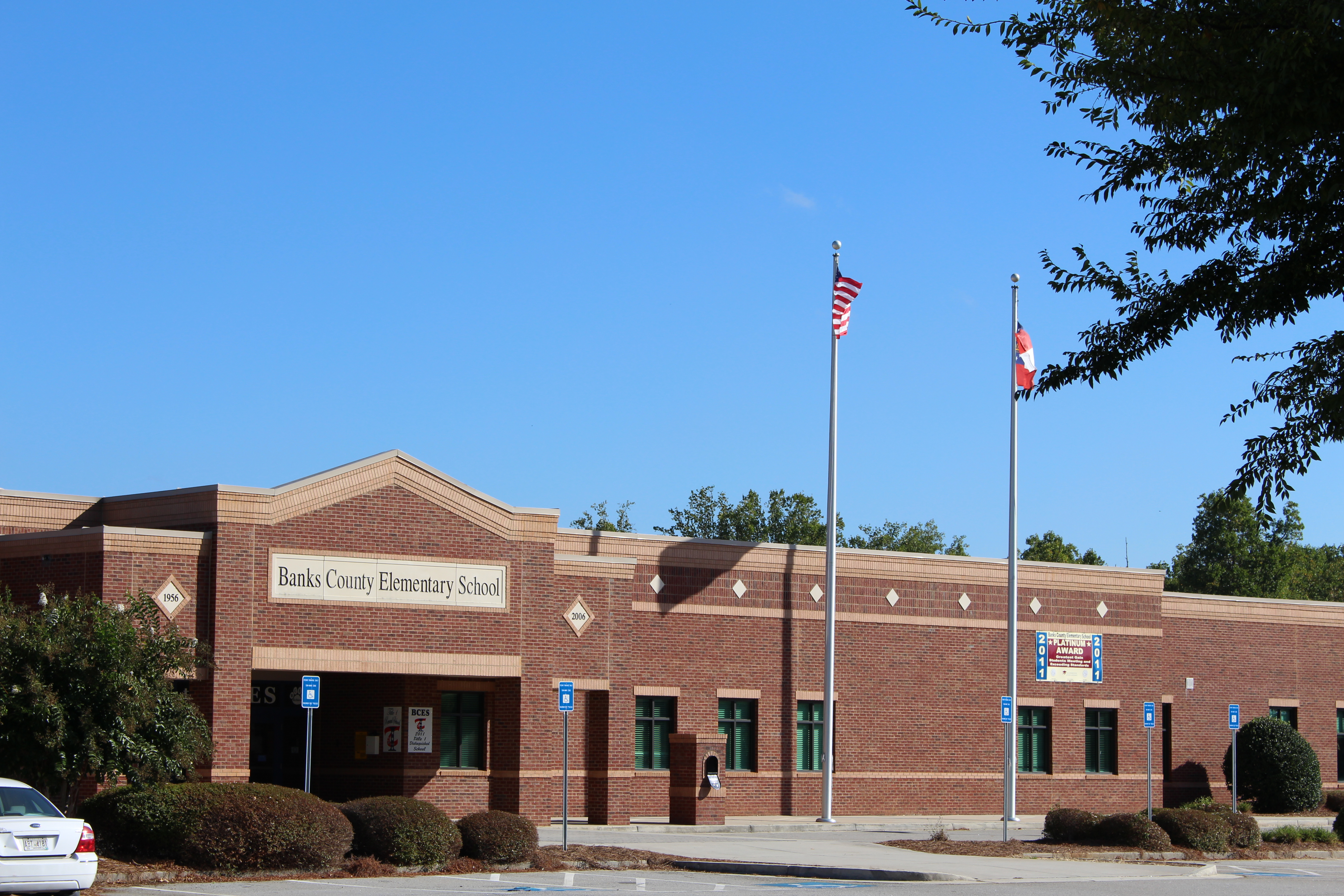
Banks County Elementary

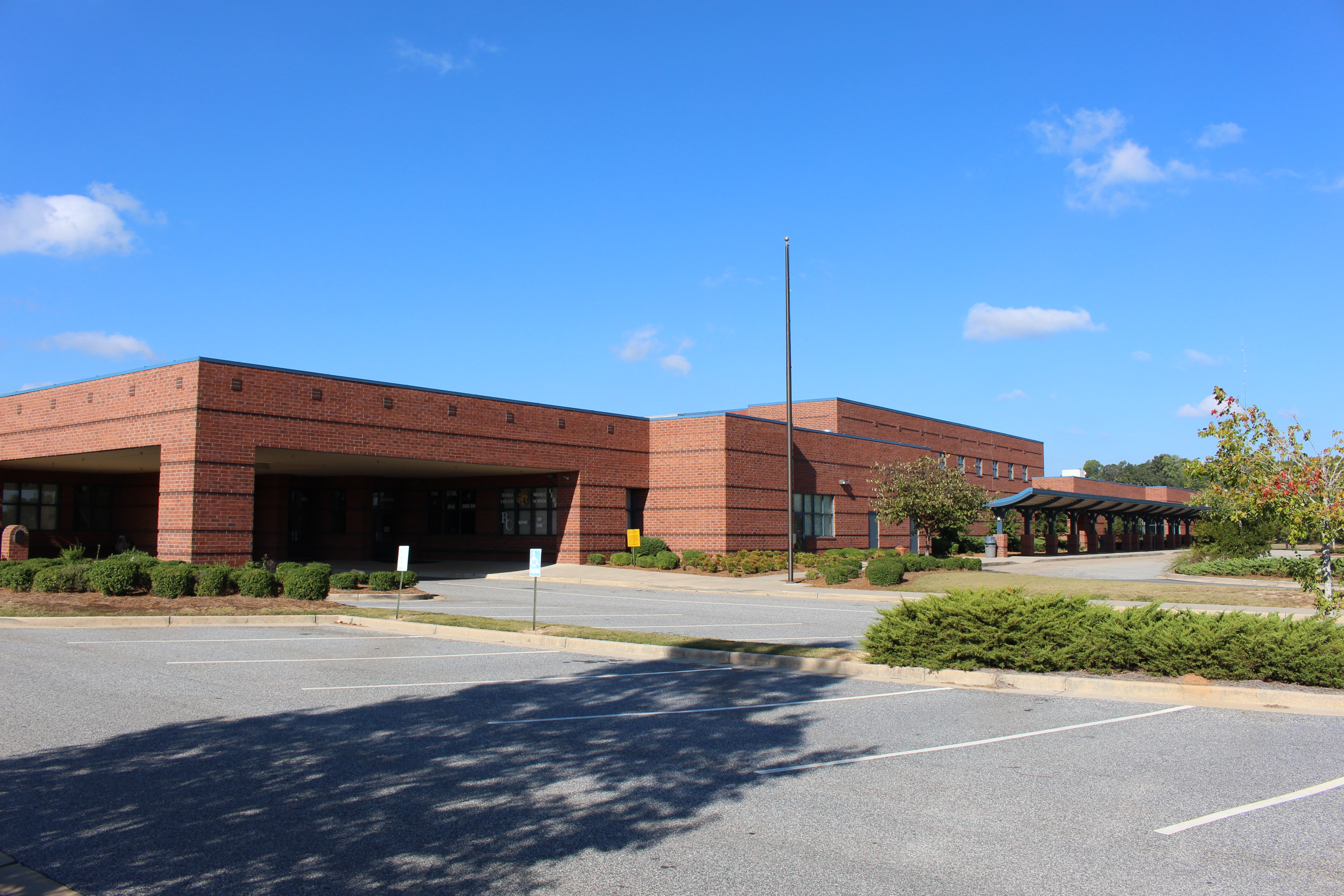
Banks County Middle

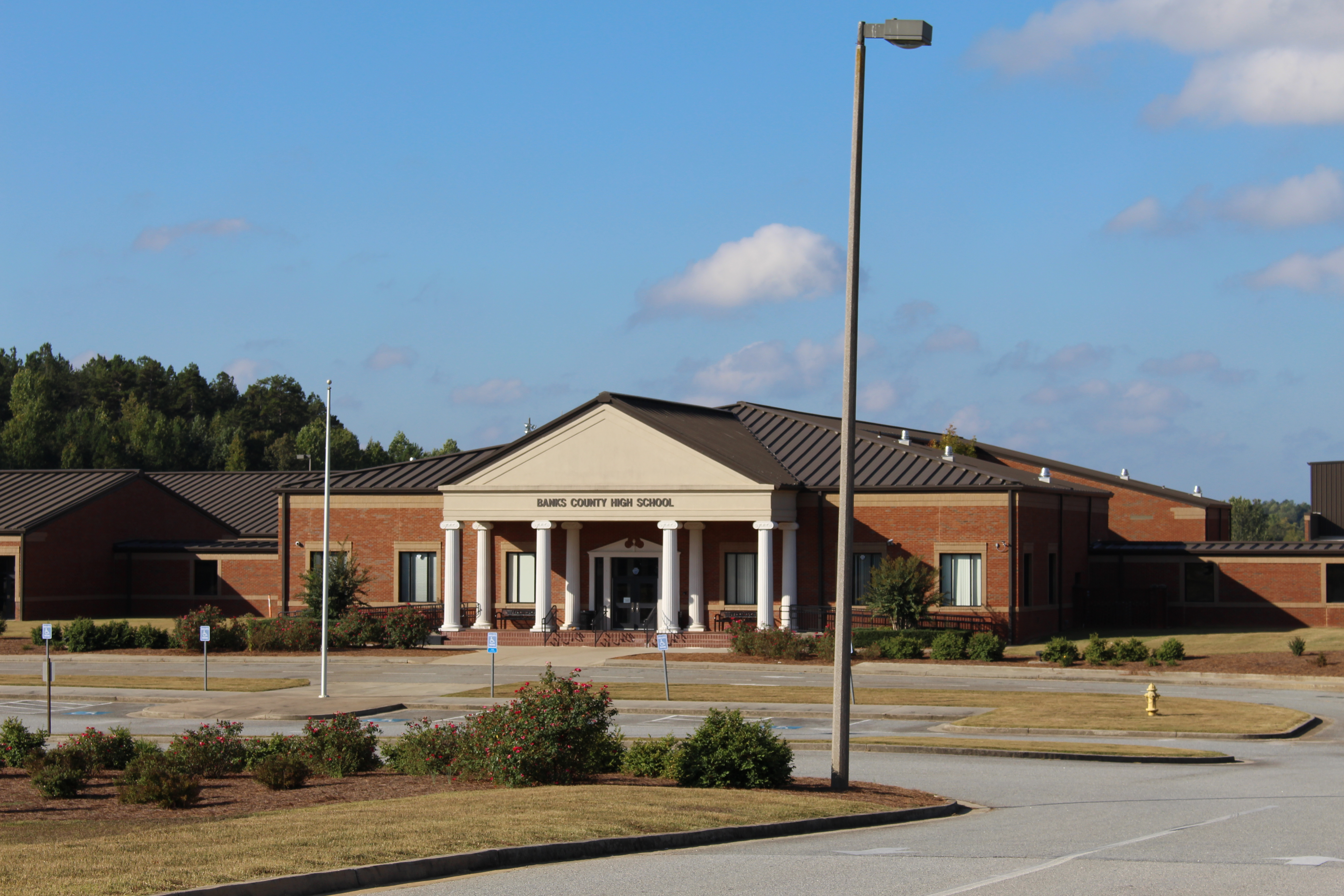
Banks County High

=== Elementary schools ===
- Banks County Elementary School (grades 3 - 5)
- Banks County Primary School (kindergarten - 2nd grade)

=== Middle school ===
- Banks County Middle School (grades 6 - 8)

=== High school ===
- Banks County High School (grades 9 - 12)
