= Mattie Lou O'Kelley =

American artist

- Born: 1908; Maysville, Georgia, U.S.
- Died: 1997 (aged 88–89); Decatur, Georgia

Mattie Lou O'Kelley (1908–July 26, 1997) was an American folk artist.

== Early life ==
O'Kelley was born on a corn and cotton farm in Maysville, Georgia, in the northeast of the state. She was the seventh of eight children. She dropped out of school in the ninth grade to help her family on the farm. In 1943, when her father died, she moved to the town of Maysville. There, she worked as a cook, waitress and seamstress until her retirement in 1968.

== Art career ==
O'Kelley was a latecomer to the field of art: it was not until her retirement at age 60 in 1968 that she began to paint, as a hobby. She painted mostly images of the Georgia countryside, including farm scenes that hearkened back to her childhood. She was discovered in 1975 by Robert Bishop, at one time the director of the American Folk Art Museum and Gudmund Vigtel, a former director of the High Museum in Atlanta, after O'Kelley had taken a bus with some of her paintings to see Vigtel in Atlanta. Bishop called her "a true American primitive -- self-taught, an exquisite recorder of time and place".

In 1976, O'Kelley received Georgia's Governor's Award in the Arts. She published three books in the 1980s: A Winter Place, From the Hills of Georgia: An Autobiography in Paintings, and Circus.

Her work is included in the collections of the Smithsonian American Art Museum and the High Museum of Art.

== Personal life ==
O'Kelley briefly lived in Manhattan before returning to Georgia in 1983, and settling in Decatur, Georgia.
