= Richard E. Banks =

American physician

Richard E. Banks (October 23, 1794 – May 6, 1856) was an American medical doctor and surgeon.

Banks was born in Elbert County, Georgia. One of thirteen children, Banks was the only one to attend college. After attending the University of Georgia (for one year), he went to the University of Pennsylvania, where Banks received his medical degree.

After practicing in Philadelphia, Pennsylvania, for a year, he returned to rural northeast Georgia and set up practice not far from his original home. Banks moved to larger offices in Gainesville, Georgia, in 1832. Banks traveled to treat settlers and Native Americans of northern Georgia and South Carolina. He was especially noted for treating the Native Americans for smallpox.

Banks died in Gainesville on May 6, 1856, and was buried in Alta Vista Cemetery in that city. The Georgia General Assembly named Banks County in his honor on December 11, 1858.
