= Old Banks County Courthouse =

- Banks County Courthouse
- U.S. National Register of Historic Places
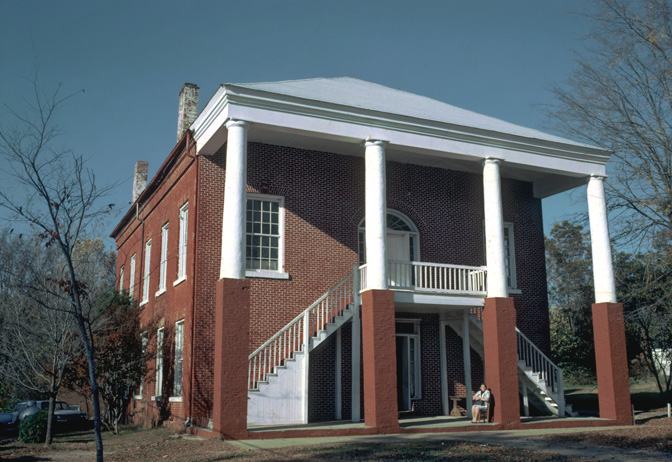
- Photo by Calvin Beale - January 1970

- Location within Georgia Location within the United States
- Location: Off U.S. 441, Homer, Georgia
- Coordinates: 34°20′5″N 83°29′56″W
- Area: 2 acres (0.81 ha)
- Built: 1860
- Built by: John Willis Pruitt, Samuel W. Pruitt
- Architectural style: Greek Revival
- MPS: Georgia County Courthouses TR
- NRHP reference No.: 80000969
- Added to NRHP: September 18, 1980

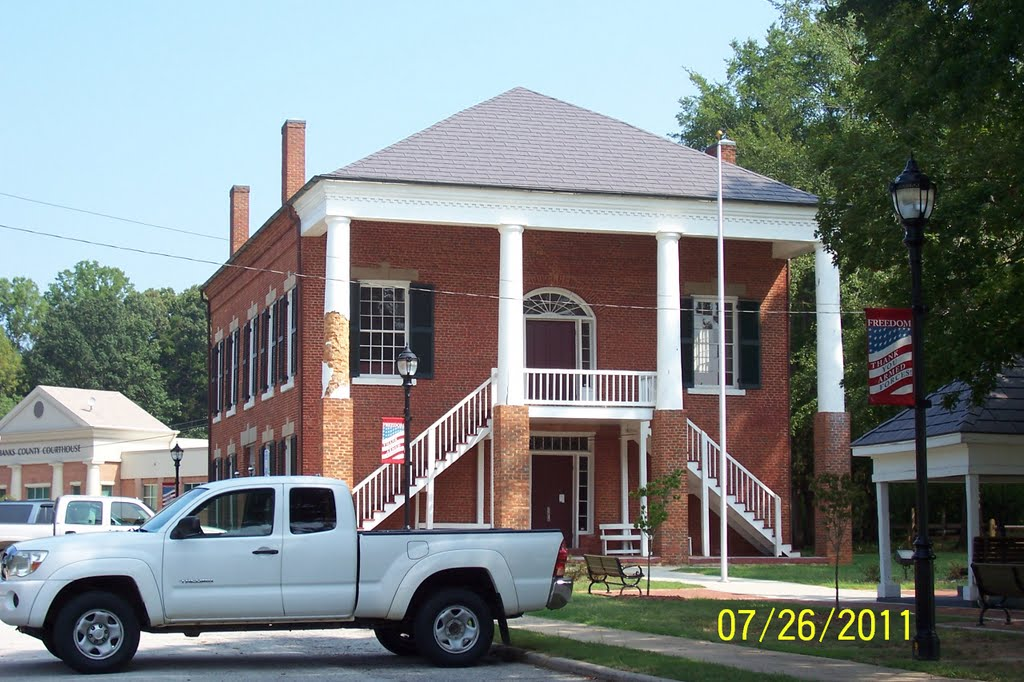
Old Banks County Courthouse - July 2011

The Old Banks County Courthouse is in Homer, Georgia. Construction started in 1860 but was interrupted because of the American Civil War. Construction was paid for with $6,600 in Confederate money. Construction was finished in 1875. (The Georgia Courthouse Manual dates it as completed in 1863.) The building is a two-story brick courthouse with a stone foundation in the Greek Revival style. It is similar to many courthouses in Virginia, which is a result of the builders being from Virginia. It has Tuscan columns that are on top of one-story brick piers. The interior originally had a cross plan. The courtroom and judge's chambers are on the second floor, which are accessed by outside double stairways.

A new courthouse replaced this one in 1987. There were plans to demolish the building, but the citizens voted by more than a 2:1 margin to save it. It was restored in 1987–1989 with funding through a hotel/motel tax.

It was added to the National Register of Historic Places in 1980.
