= Hebron Church, Cemetery, and Academy =

Historic church in Georgia, United States

- U.S. National Register of Historic Places
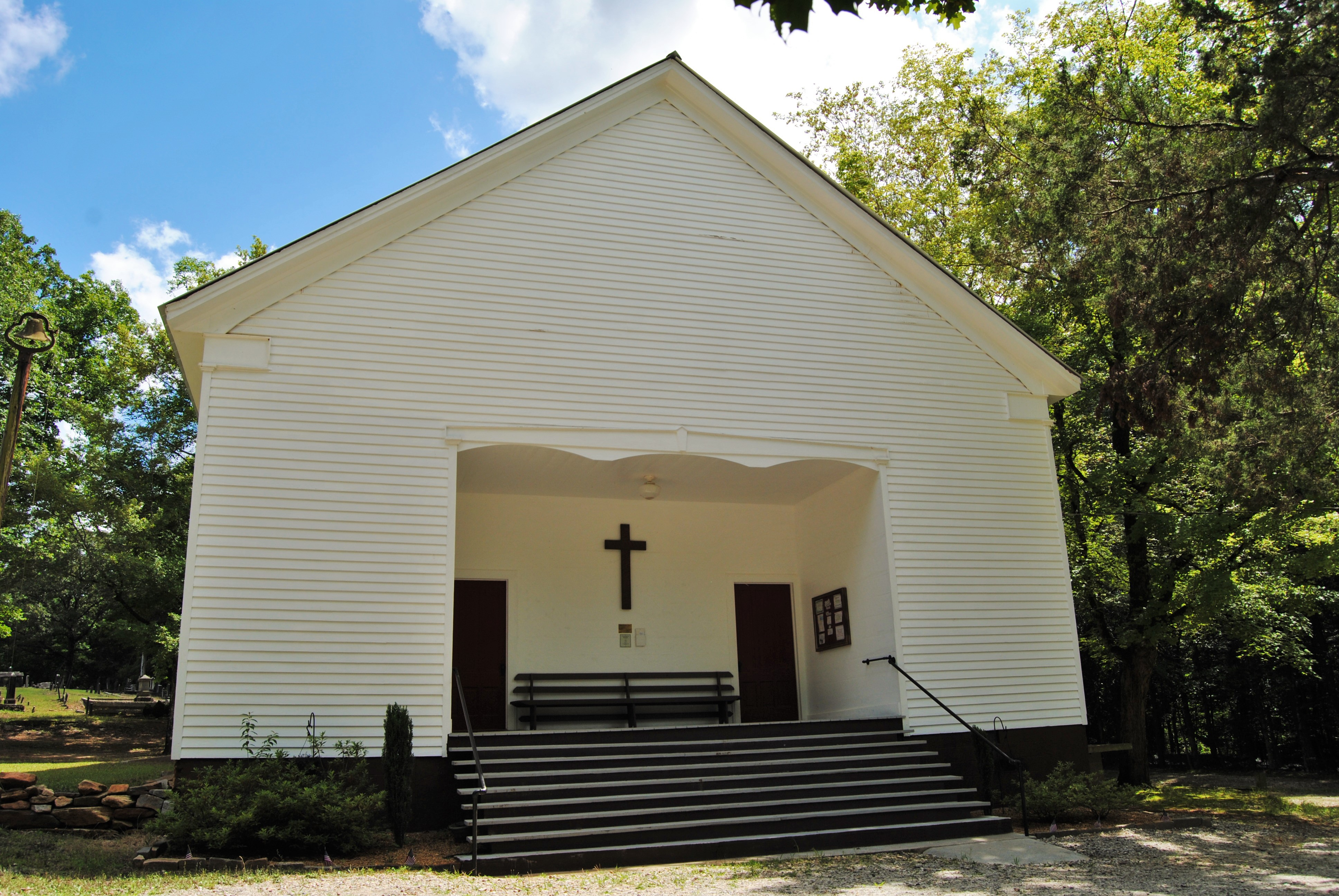
- Hebron Church

- Location within Georgia Location within the United States
- Nearest city: Commerce, Georgia
- Coordinates: 34°17′12″N 83°21′53″W
- Area: 14 acres (5.7 ha)
- NRHP reference No.: 85002176
- Added to NRHP: September 12, 1985

Hebron Church, Cemetery, and Academy is a site in Commerce, Georgia. It was founded in 1796 in what is now Banks County, Georgia. It is listed on the National Register of Historic Places as Hebron Church, Cemetery and Academy.

Hebron was formed by Scotch-Irish settlers and Revolutionary veterans who received land grants from the Georgia State Legislature. Hebron is one of the oldest congregations in Banks County. The church was organized by Rev. John Newton, who served as the first pastor.

The church building at Hebron is a large, white, frame structure. There is an entrance porch that is closed on three sides. On each side of the porch is a large door. The reason for this double entrance dates back to the days when the men and women separated at the church door and did not sit together as they do now.

Some of the notable items regarding Hebron Church include:

- above ground burial vaults from the early days of the cemetery.
- a school (Academy) located on the church grounds
- a number of Revolutionary War Veterans interred in the cemetery.
- nineteen young men from the church were killed during the American Civil War.

== Notable members of the congregation or Academy attendees ==
James Ramsey, Sr., a charter member of Hebron, settled on the Hudson River half a mile from Hebron and built the mill that long bore his name. This mill was one of the first industrial centers in this whole section of the state. There furniture, caskets, wagons, buggies and farming implements were made. It was for a long time one of the most thriving trading posts for miles around. At that time, Augusta, Georgia was the only town of any consequence where commerce could be carried on. James Ramsey is believed to be one of the Colonels who marched in the procession at George Washington's funeral.

== Examples of Southern Appalachian culture ==
Mrs John Carlan, a daughter of Mrs. Martha Williams Bellamy and a niece of Mrs. James H. Glasure gathered long smooth runners of the wild Japanese running honeysuckle that grew near her home. After carefully selecting the runners of uniform size she "skinned" each honeysuckle runner and soaked them in water until they were very soft and pliable. Taking these long soft runners, she skillfully wove by hand two round baskets six inches in diameter, two inches in height, finished with a beautiful scallop and a row of double weave. On the outside bottom of each basket she fastened a handle of wood that measured one inch wide, three-fourths inch thick and sixty inches long. Then she lined the bottom of the baskets with a piece of the best cloth she had. She gave these two baskets to the church to be used in the "taking up" of the collection. The deacons passing from row to row would lift the baskets over the heads of the people, then lower the baskets to a height where each could put money into the basket. This custom continued until about 1918 when the handles were removed. Those old woven baskets have now been replaced with modern collection plates.

Hebron had the distinction of having one minister, the Rev. Groves H. Cartledge, serve as pastor for 47 years (1852–1899). He was noted for his learning, doctrinal views, eloquence and power. The Methodist Church of Liberty at Fort Lamar invited him to preach on the subject of "Baptism". His zeal for sound doctrine led him to speak for four hours. It was in the summertime and the weather was hot. After he had spoken for about three hours he became conscious of the fact that his gutta-percha buttons were melting, and that he was about to be divested of part of his wearing apparel. Determined to finish, however, he gathered his trousers together with one hand, confining his gesticulations to the other, and in that attitude finished his sermon.

== Hebron Academy ==
During 1819 the first Sabbath School (later Hebron Academy) at Hebron, and perhaps the first one in upper Georgia, was organized and put into operation by licentiate John Harrison, of Jackson County, Georgia. The plan of the school was drawn up by Mr. Harrison. It became the model for many other churches. The white people were formed into classes and the enslaved people were taught to read with the consent of their enslavers. Records say that many slaves were taught to read, and were instructed in the "Shorter Catechism" and the Bible. This sabbath school flourished for a number of years, until the abolition movement became so great that the state legislature in self-defense passed a law forbidding the teaching of negro slaves to read. This cut them off from the sabbath School. The school continued for the white students. James H. Glasure, served as Superintendent of the sabbath school for more than twenty years. He was also an elder of the Hebron Church.
