= Maysville, Georgia =

- Town
- Seal

- Location in Banks County and the state of Georgia
- Coordinates: 34°15′20″N 83°33′08″W
- Country: United States
- State: Georgia
- Counties: Banks, Jackson

Area
  - Total: 4.72 sq mi (12.22 km^{2})
  - Land: 4.66 sq mi (12.06 km^{2})
  - Water: 0.062 sq mi (0.16 km^{2})
- Elevation: 889 ft (271 m)

Population (2020)
  - Total: 1,867
  - Density: 401.0/sq mi (154.83/km^{2})
- Time zone: UTC-5 (Eastern (EST))
  - Summer (DST): UTC-4 (EDT)
- ZIP code: 30558
- Area code: 706
- FIPS code: 13-50484
- GNIS feature ID: 2406117
- Website: cityofmaysvillega.org

Maysville is a town in Banks and Jackson counties in the U.S. state of Georgia. As of the 2020 census, Maysville had a population of 1,867.

== History ==
The Georgia General Assembly incorporated Maysville as a town in 1879.

== Geography ==
According to the United States Census Bureau, the town has a total area of 4.3 square miles (11.2 km^{2}), of which 4.2 square miles (11.0 km^{2}) is land and 0.04 square miles (0.1 km^{2}), or 1.27%, is water.

Maysville is 70 miles (110 km) northeast of Atlanta. Towns within 10 miles (16 km) include Commerce, Gillsville, Lula, Jefferson, and Pendergrass.

== Climate ==
Maysville has a humid subtropical climate. The temperature peaks in July with an average high of 90°, but temperatures can get much colder during the winter months. The average low during January was 29°. Maysville has even seen fair amounts of heavier than average snowfall in the past. An example of this occurred in March 2009 when several inches of snow fell across Banks County.

== Government ==
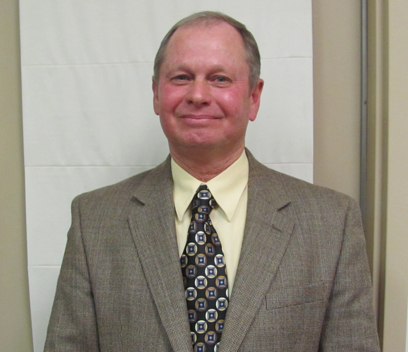
Richard Presley, Mayor of Maysville

The governing legislative authority has two components. A mayor serves as the top executive along with four city council members. The head of the local government is Mayor Richard Presley.

== City council ==
The legislative council serves as governing head, in conjunction with the mayor, over Maysville and its issues. it was established in March 2010 by House Bill 961.

=== Qualifications ===
"The members of the city council shall serve for terms of four years and until the respective successors are elected and qualified. The term of office of each member of the city council shall begin on the first day of January immediately following the election of such member unless general law authorizes or requires the term to begin at the first organizational meeting in January or upon some other date. No person shall be eligible to serve as mayor or councilmember unless that person shall have been a resident of the city for 12 months prior to the date of the election of mayor or members of the city council; each shall continue to reside therein during that person´s period of service and to be registered and qualified to vote in municipal elections of this city.The mayor and councilmembers shall be elected by plurality vote as provided in Section 5.13 of this charter."

=== Council meetings ===
The city council holds an organizational meeting on the first Monday of January following each election. The meeting is called to order by the city clerk and the oath of office is administered to the newly elected members. Special meetings of the city council may be held should the mayor request them. All councilmembers must be notified personally, or by telephone, at least 48 hours in advance of the meeting.

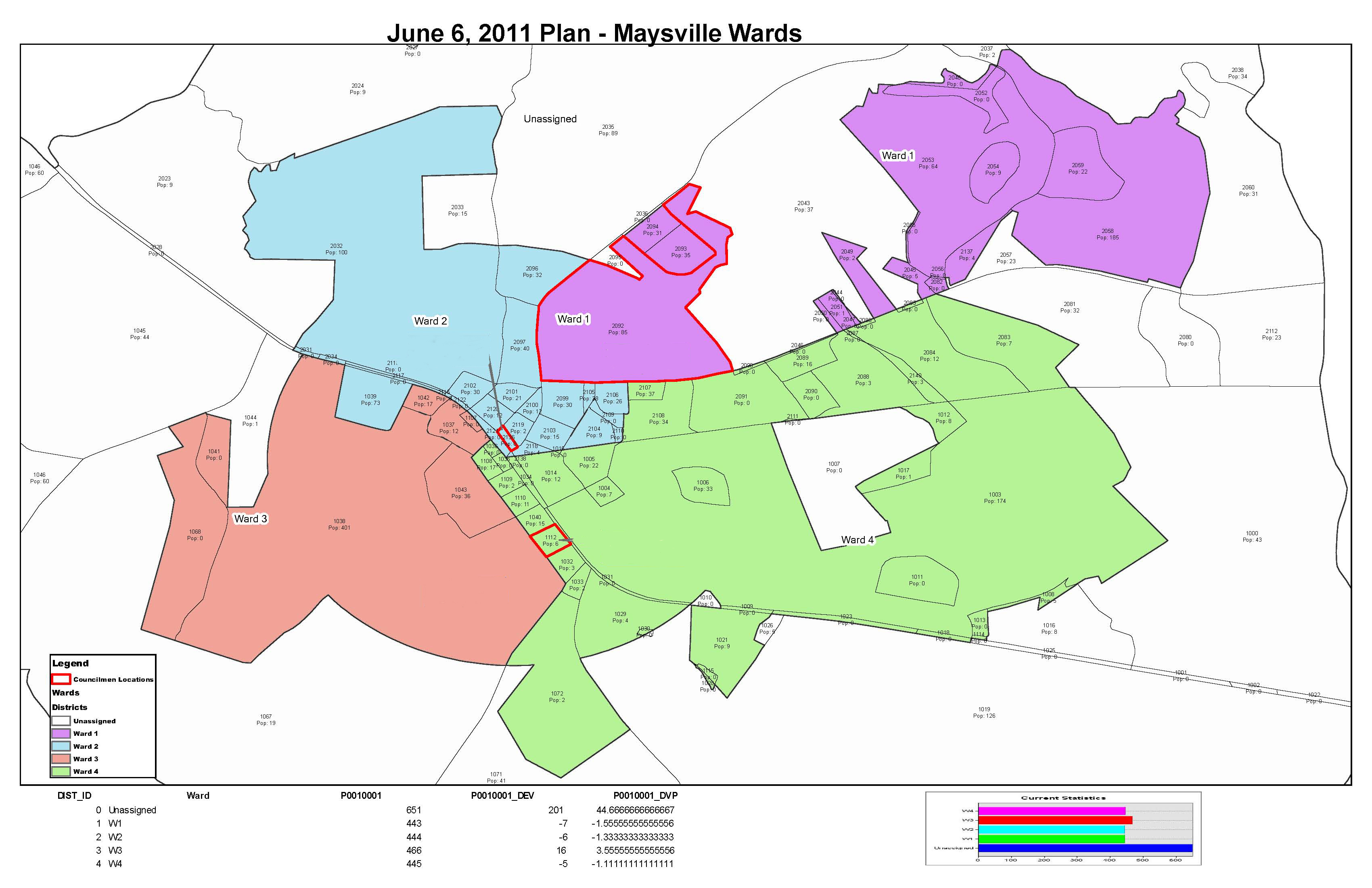
Map of Maysville's wards

== Political wards ==
Maysville is apportioned into four voting wards. Members from the city's council are elected into representing each assigned ward during council meetings.

== Demographics ==
Historical population
Census	Pop.	Note	%±
1880	116		—
1890	327		181.9%
1900	453		38.5%
1910	805		77.7%
1920	795		−1.2%
1930	619		−22.1%
1940	514		−17.0%
1950	533		3.7%
1960	553		3.8%
1970	553		0.0%
1980	619		11.9%
1990	728		17.6%
2000	1,247		71.3%
2010	1,798		44.2%
2020	1,867		3.8%
U.S. Decennial Census

=== 2020 census ===
As of the 2020 census, Maysville had a population of 1,867. The median age was 40.0 years. 24.3% of residents were under the age of 18 and 17.1% of residents were 65 years of age or older. For every 100 females there were 92.9 males, and for every 100 females age 18 and over there were 88.5 males age 18 and over.

0.0% of residents lived in urban areas, while 100.0% lived in rural areas.

There were 663 households in Maysville, of which 38.6% had children under the age of 18 living in them. Of all households, 57.6% were married-couple households, 13.7% were households with a male householder and no spouse or partner present, and 23.4% were households with a female householder and no spouse or partner present. About 18.4% of all households were made up of individuals and 10.5% had someone living alone who was 65 years of age or older.

There were 706 housing units, of which 6.1% were vacant. The homeowner vacancy rate was 0.4% and the rental vacancy rate was 7.4%.

Racial composition as of the 2020 census
Race	Number	Percent
White	1,678	89.9%
Black or African American	37	2.0%
American Indian and Alaska Native	7	0.4%
Asian	12	0.6%
Native Hawaiian and Other Pacific Islander	0	0.0%
Some other race	46	2.5%
Two or more races	87	4.7%
Hispanic or Latino (of any race)	92	4.9%

=== 2010 census ===
As of the census of 2010, there were 1,798 people, 669 households, and 493 families residing in the town. There were 756 housing units, of which 87, or 11.5%, were vacant. The racial makeup of the city was 93.8% white, 2.2% African American, 0.4% Asian, 1.1% some other race, and 2.4% from two or more races. 2.6% of the population were Hispanic or Latino of any race.

Of the 669 households, 35.9% had children under the age of 18 living with them, 58.7% were headed by married couples living together, 10.6% had a female householder with no husband present, and 26.3% were non-families. 24.1% of all households were made up of individuals, and 12.1% were someone living alone who was 65 years of age or older. The average household size was 2.66, and the average family size was 3.13.

In the town, 25.4% of the population were under the age of 18, 7.9% were from 18 to 24, 26.5% from 25 to 44, 26.7% from 45 to 64, and 13.5% were 65 years of age or older. The median age was 38.4 years. For every 100 females, there were 92.7 males. For every 100 females age 18 and over, there were 88.3 males.

=== Income and poverty ===
For the period 2012–2016, the estimated median annual income for a household was $37,714, and the median income for a family was $40,313. The per capita income for the town was $18,105. Male full-time workers had a median income of $40,313, versus $33,438 for females. 21.5% of the population and 23.3% of families were below the poverty line. 23.7% of the population under the age of 18 and 14.7% of those 65 or older were living in poverty.

=== 2000 census ===
As of the census of 2000, there were 1,247 people, 481 households, and 365 families residing in the town. The population density was 346.1 inhabitants per square mile (133.6/km^{2}). There were 529 housing units at an average density of 146.8 per square mile (56.7/km^{2}). The racial makeup of the town was 95.11% White, 2.57% African American, 0.08% Native American, 0.24% Asian, 0.96% from other races, and 1.04% from two or more races. Hispanic or Latino people of any race were 1.52% of the population.

There were 481 households, out of which 35.8% had children under the age of 18 living with them, 61.7% were married couples living together, 9.6% had a female householder with no husband present, and 24.1% were non-families. 21.6% of all households were made up of individuals, and 8.9% had someone living alone who was 65 years of age or older. The average household size was 2.58 and the average family size was 2.99.

In the town, the population was spread out, with 26.3% under the age of 18, 6.9% from 18 to 24, 32.7% from 25 to 44, 22.5% from 45 to 64, and 11.5% who were 65 years of age or older. The median age was 36 years. For every 100 females, there were 93.6 males. For every 100 females age 18 and over, there were 85.3 males.

The median income for a household in the town was $40,714, and the median income for a family was $47,368. Males had a median income of $34,063 versus $24,615 for females. The per capita income for the town was $17,153. About 4.5% of families and 6.6% of the population were below the poverty line, including 3.6% of those under age 18 and 21.4% of those age 65 or over.

== Education ==
The portion in Banks County is in the Banks County School District. Students there are zoned to Banks County High School.

The portion in Jackson County is in the Jackson County School District.
