= Homer, Georgia =

- Town
- Seal

- Location in Banks County and the state of Georgia
- Coordinates: 34°20′08″N 83°29′55″W
- Country: United States
- State: Georgia
- County: Banks

Area
  - Total: 9.84 sq mi (25.48 km^{2})
  - Land: 9.80 sq mi (25.39 km^{2})
  - Water: 0.039 sq mi (0.10 km^{2})
- Elevation: 837 ft (255 m)

Population (2020)
  - Total: 1,264
  - Density: 129.0/sq mi (49.79/km^{2})
- Time zone: UTC-5 (Eastern (EST))
  - Summer (DST): UTC-4 (EDT)
- ZIP code: 30547
- Area code: 706
- FIPS code: 13-39720
- GNIS feature ID: 2405857
- Website: https://townofhomerga.com/

Homer is a town in Banks County, Georgia, United States. As of the 2020 census, Homer had a population of 1,264. The town is the county seat of Banks County.

== History ==
The community was named after Homer Jackson, a pioneer citizen. Homer was founded in 1858 as seat for the newly established Banks County. Homer was incorporated as a town in 1859, and its first courthouse was built in 1863.

== Geography ==
According to the United States Census Bureau, the town has a total area of 9.7 square miles (25.0 km^{2}), of which 9.6 square miles (24.9 km^{2}) is land and 0.04 square miles (0.1 km^{2}), or 0.38%, is water.

== Demographics ==
Historical population
Census	Pop.	Note	%±
1870	120		—
1880	140		16.7%
1900	221		—
1910	228		3.2%
1920	291		27.6%
1930	248		−14.8%
1940	283		14.1%
1950	340		20.1%
1960	612		80.0%
1970	365		−40.4%
1980	734		101.1%
1990	742		1.1%
2000	950		28.0%
2010	1,141		20.1%
2020	1,264		10.8%
2023 (est.)	1,647		30.3%
U.S. Decennial Census

=== 2020 census ===
As of the 2020 census, Homer had a population of 1,264. The median age was 37.3 years. 25.6% of residents were under the age of 18 and 15.3% of residents were 65 years of age or older. For every 100 females there were 100.6 males, and for every 100 females age 18 and over there were 95.2 males age 18 and over.

0.0% of residents lived in urban areas, while 100.0% lived in rural areas.

There were 465 households in Homer, of which 37.8% had children under the age of 18 living in them. Of all households, 55.9% were married-couple households, 16.8% were households with a male householder and no spouse or partner present, and 22.2% were households with a female householder and no spouse or partner present. About 23.4% of all households were made up of individuals and 8.6% had someone living alone who was 65 years of age or older.

There were 518 housing units, of which 10.2% were vacant. The homeowner vacancy rate was 2.5% and the rental vacancy rate was 9.8%.

Racial composition as of the 2020 census
Race	Number	Percent
White	1,129	89.3%
Black or African American	41	3.2%
American Indian and Alaska Native	6	0.5%
Asian	8	0.6%
Native Hawaiian and Other Pacific Islander	1	0.1%
Some other race	12	0.9%
Two or more races	67	5.3%
Hispanic or Latino (of any race)	41	3.2%

=== 2000 census ===
As of the census of 2000, there were 950 people, 366 households, and 249 families residing in the town. The population density was 99.1 inhabitants per square mile (38.3/km^{2}). There were 406 housing units at an average density of 42.4 per square mile (16.4/km^{2}). The racial makeup of the town was 84.32% White, 11.79% African American, 1.16% Native American, 0.84% Asian, 1.16% from other races, and 0.74% from two or more races. Hispanic or Latino people of any race were 2.00% of the population.

There were 366 households, out of which 36.3% had children under the age of 18 living with them, 54.4% were married couples living together, 10.4% had a female householder with no husband present, and 31.7% were non-families. 26.2% of all households were made up of individuals, and 12.6% had someone living alone who was 65 years of age or older. The average household size was 2.60 and the average family size was 3.16.

In the town, the population was spread out, with 28.1% under the age of 18, 10.5% from 18 to 24, 29.1% from 25 to 44, 20.5% from 45 to 64, and 11.8% who were 65 years of age or older. The median age was 33 years. For every 100 females, there were 95.5 males. For every 100 females age 18 and over, there were 95.1 males.

The median income for a household in the town was $35,500, and the median income for a family was $41,667. Males had a median income of $30,147 versus $23,438 for females. The per capita income for the town was $17,353. About 8.9% of families and 13.3% of the population were below the poverty line, including 14.3% of those under age 18 and 21.1% of those age 65 or over.

== Arts and culture ==
Homer is among the earliest to hold the world record for an Easter egg hunt - 80,000 eggs, listed in the 1985 Guinness Book of World Records. The event in the small town of 1,100 people is an Easter Sunday tradition that has lasted 47 years. The egg hunt each year draws about 5,000 egg hunters, children and adults. Even though it no longer holds the record, Homer has long touted its annual hunt as the world's largest.

== Education ==
Banks County students in kindergarten to grade twelve are in the Banks County School District, which consists of two elementary schools, a middle school and a high school. The district has 150 full-time teachers and over 2,428 students.

- Banks County Elementary School
- Banks County Primary School
- Banks County Middle School
- Banks County High School
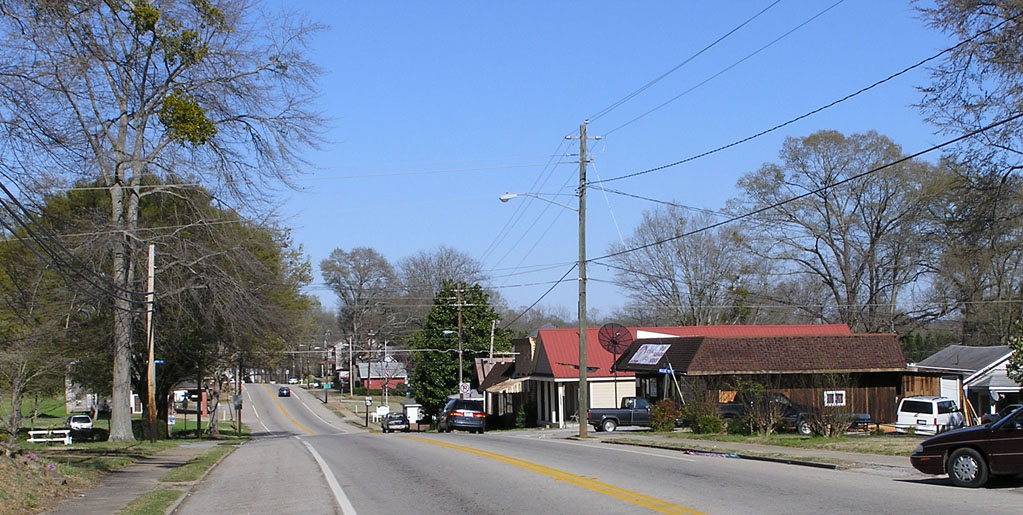
A view of downtown Homer's main street

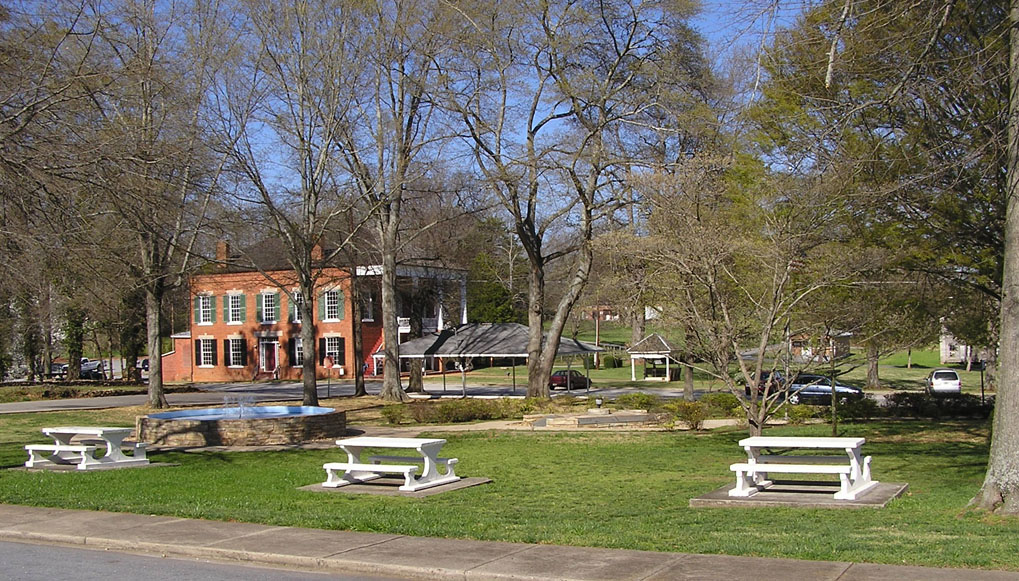
Looking across the park downtown towards the old Banks County Courthouse, the large brick building in the left background

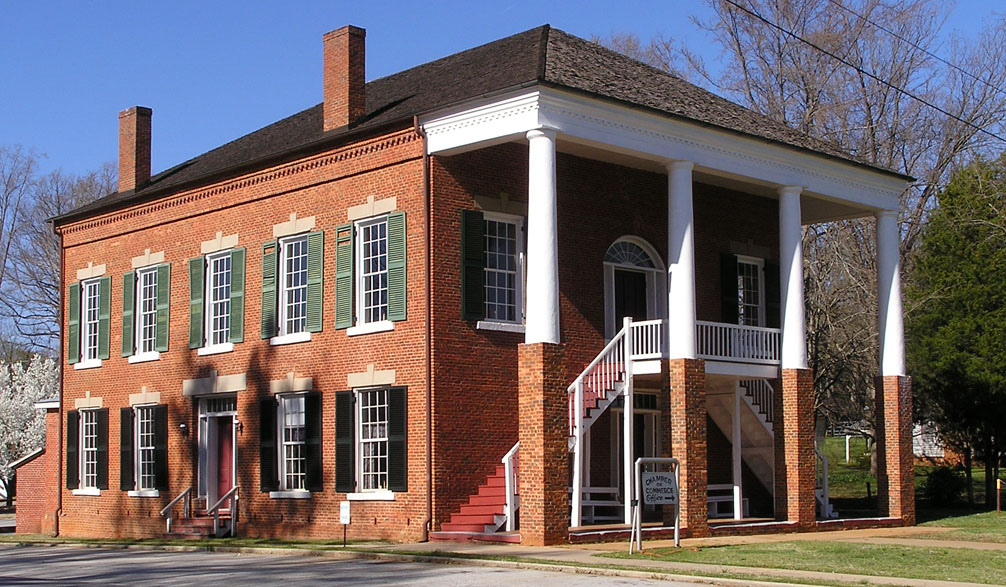
A closeup of the Old Banks County Courthouse, now a tourist attraction

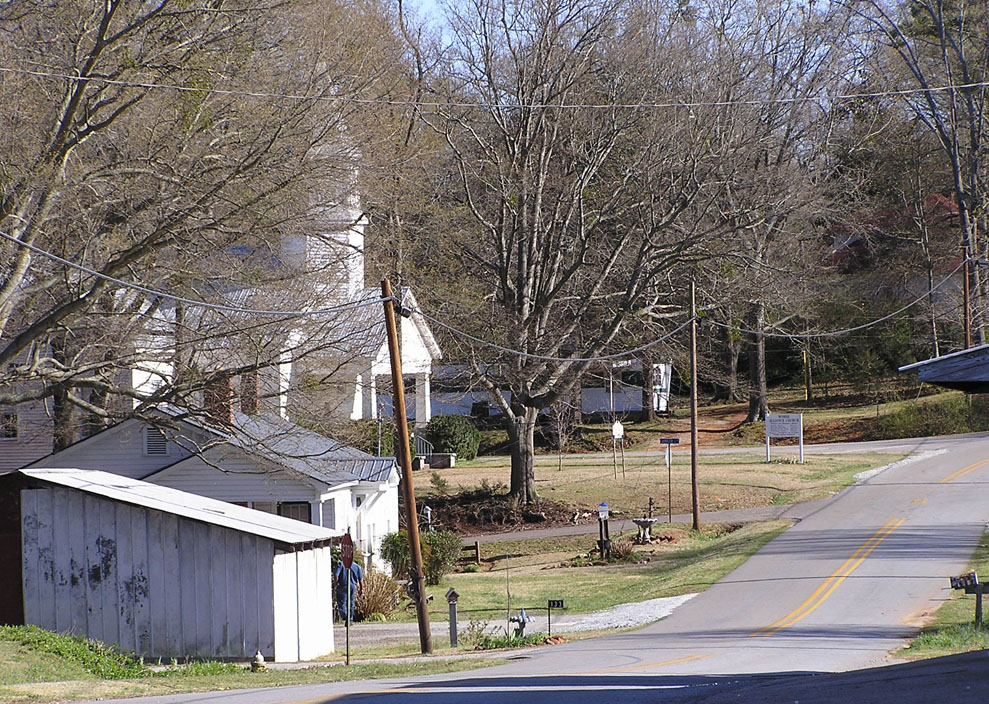
A view down a side street off the main street of Homer. The church is the First Baptist Church of Homer.
