= Lula, Georgia =

- City
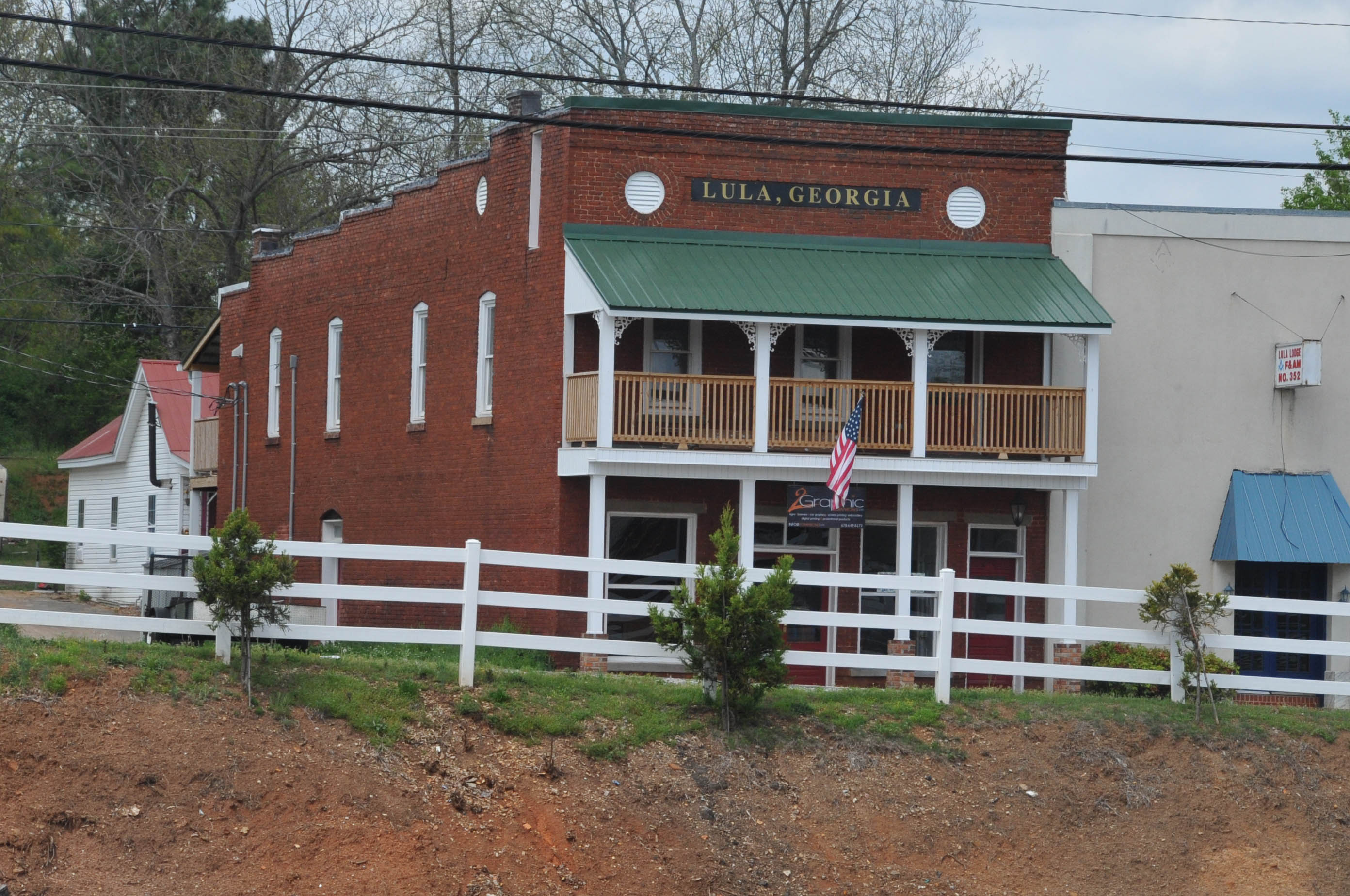

- Location in Hall County and the state of Georgia
- Coordinates: 34°22′15″N 83°40′57″W
- Country: United States
- State: Georgia
- Counties: Hall, Banks

Area
  - Total: 4.33 sq mi (11.21 km^{2})
  - Land: 4.32 sq mi (11.18 km^{2})
  - Water: 0.012 sq mi (0.03 km^{2})
- Elevation: 1,326 ft (404 m)

Population (2020)
  - Total: 2,822
  - Density: 653.9/sq mi (252.48/km^{2})
- Time zone: UTC-5 (Eastern (EST))
  - Summer (DST): UTC-4 (EDT)
- ZIP code: 30554
- Area code: 770
- FIPS code: 13-47896
- GNIS feature ID: 2404971
- Website: cityoflula.com

Lula is a city in Hall and Banks counties in the U.S. state of Georgia. The population was 2,822 at the 2020 census, and the town has both Hall and Banks county zoning. Lula is the railroad junction between the Atlanta northeast line and the Athens north line of Norfolk Southern Railway.

Lula was established in 1874 and incorporated as a city by the Georgia General Assembly in 1905. The city was established and gained relevance by creating a junction for the Airline Railroad (later named the Southern Railroad). This provided essential economy and goods in the late 1800s that jumpstarted the establishment of the city.

A notable annual event that takes place each year in the city of Lula is the Railroad Days Festival that includes celebrating the history of the city by having entertainment, local venders, and a parade. Residents are either zoned to the Hall County School District, or the Banks County School District.

== History ==
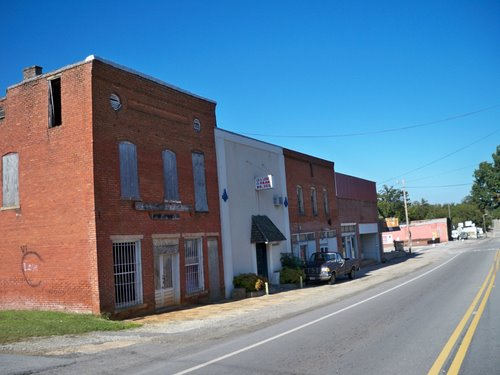
Downtown Lula

It has been recorded by many that the naming of the city of Lula was inspired by a daughter of the Athens businessman Ferdinand Phinizy. There is no official record that any of Phinizy's children were named Lula, but some assume that it could have been a nickname for one his daughters. Nonetheless, the town was created in part because of Phinizy. A business man and director of railroad companies, he bought the White Sulphur Springs Resort that rested between the city of Gainesville and where Lula would one day be. Because of this, Phinizy encouraged the establishment and building of railroads to run through Hall County.

A civil engineer named Joel Hurt began construction of Lula in 1874, but "In 1876, the North Eastern Railroad of Georgia opened, connecting Athens and Lula (just north of Gainesville), where it connected with the Air Line Railroad." At first, residents of the area assumed that the railroad junction would be built in the town of Belton (also referred to as 'Bellton' with an extra 'L' that was lost over time) the next town over, because it was the larger of the two. However, the company building the rail line was persuaded by a generous amount of land deeded to build the railway by brothers Joseph H. and Dunstan E. Banks. The requirement for the land to be deeded was that the town of Lula be constructed at the junction, and that the main depot rest on land donated by the brothers.

At the time when the connector was being built, it was a legal requirement that 40 miles of track was laid to be eligible for a state charter. Because Belton was not selected for the junction and it wasn't desired to run the extra mile into the neighboring town, one mile was laid going into the hills of the mountains and was never used. After the rail line was finished, the Banks brothers opened a store and warehouse, and many other businesses opened causing Lula to outgrow Belton. The schools for Belton and Lula consolidated in 1911, and eventually the Belton depot closed and trains only came to Lula. Water supply was also an issue for Belton, and Lula could more easily extend their reserves. All of these events led to the community voting a majority in favor of absorbing the sister town of Belton in 1955.

Marcelle Woody became the first female mayor in 1991 and served the city until 1996. Notably, she initiated the first employee health insurance program, adding two new water tanks, and restoring and remodeling the old city hall.

== Geography ==
The city of Lula is located at coordinates 34°22′15″N 83°40′57″W. According to the United States Census Bureau, the city has a total area of 4.3 square miles (11.2 km^{2}), of which 0.012 square miles (0.03 km^{2}), or 0.26%, is water. Most of Lula is in Hall County, with a small eastern portion of the city located in Banks County. The Hall County portion of Lula is part of the Gainesville, GA Metropolitan Statistical Area. The Banks County portion of Lula is next to the town that makes up most of Banks County, Gillsville, Georgia.

Major roads that go through Lula are Georgia State Route 52, Georgia State Route 51 S, and State Route 365 (also referred to as Sidney Lanier Parkway).

== Demographics ==
Historical population
Census	Pop.	Note	%±
1900	217		—
1910	309		42.4%
1920	367		18.8%
1930	315		−14.2%
1940	316		0.3%
1950	378		19.6%
1960	557		47.4%
1970	736		32.1%
1980	857		16.4%
1990	1,018		18.8%
2000	1,438		41.3%
2010	2,758		91.8%
2020	2,822		2.3%
U.S. Decennial Census

=== 2020 census ===
Lula racial composition
Race	Num.	Perc.
White (non-Hispanic)	2,084	73.85%
Black or African American (non-Hispanic)	206	7.3%
Native American	3	0.11%
Asian	38	1.35%
Other/Mixed	139	4.93%
Hispanic or Latino	352	12.47%

As of the 2020 census, Lula had a population of 2,822. The median age was 34.9 years. 26.6% of residents were under the age of 18 and 11.4% were 65 years of age or older. For every 100 females there were 96.1 males, and for every 100 females age 18 and over there were 91.8 males age 18 and over.

According to the 2020 Census, 0.0% of residents lived in urban areas and 100.0% lived in rural areas.

There were 1,000 households in the city, of which 41.2% had children under the age of 18 living in them. Of all households, 50.0% were married-couple households, 16.6% were households with a male householder and no spouse or partner present, and 25.5% were households with a female householder and no spouse or partner present. About 20.6% of all households were made up of individuals and 10.1% had someone living alone who was 65 years of age or older.

There were 724 families residing in the city.

There were 1,057 housing units, of which 5.4% were vacant. The homeowner vacancy rate was 0.9% and the rental vacancy rate was 5.2%.

=== County breakdown ===
The Lula population by county breakdown was as follows: 2,000 in Hall County and 158 in Banks County.

=== 2000 census ===
As of the census of 2000, there were 1,438 people, 531 households, and 399 families residing in the city. The population density was 520.1 inhabitants per square mile (200.8/km^{2}). There were 585 housing units at an average density of 211.6 per square mile (81.7/km^{2}). The racial makeup of the city was 89.71% White, 8.14% African American, 0.42% Asian, 0.07% Pacific Islander, 1.25% from other races, and 0.42% from two or more races. Hispanic or Latino of any race were 2.23% of the population.

There were 531 households, out of which 39.5% had children under the age of 18 living with them, 59.5% were married couples living together, 12.4% had a female householder with no husband present, and 24.7% were non-families. 20.5% of all households were made up of individuals, and 10.2% had someone living alone who was 65 years of age or older. The average household size was 2.71 and the average family size was 3.13.

In the city, the population was spread out, with 28.0% under the age of 18, 8.9% from 18 to 24, 31.6% from 25 to 44, 21.1% from 45 to 64, and 10.4% who were 65 years of age or older. The median age was 34 years. For every 100 females, there were 92.5 males. For every 100 females age 18 and over, there were 89.2 males.

The median income for a household in the city was $36,741, and the median income for a family was $43,667. Males had a median income of $30,195 versus $23,750 for females. The per capita income for the city was $15,246. About 7.5% of families and 11.5% of the population were below the poverty line, including 14.0% of those under age 18 and 17.9% of those age 65 or over.

=== American Community Survey 2023 Estimates ===
The American Community Survey provides data for a period of 5 years, and it shows that the Median Household Income in Lula is $64,282. 15.6% or more of the residents hold a bachelor's degree or higher, and there is an employment rate of 63.7%. About 16.5% of residents are without healthcare.

== Education ==
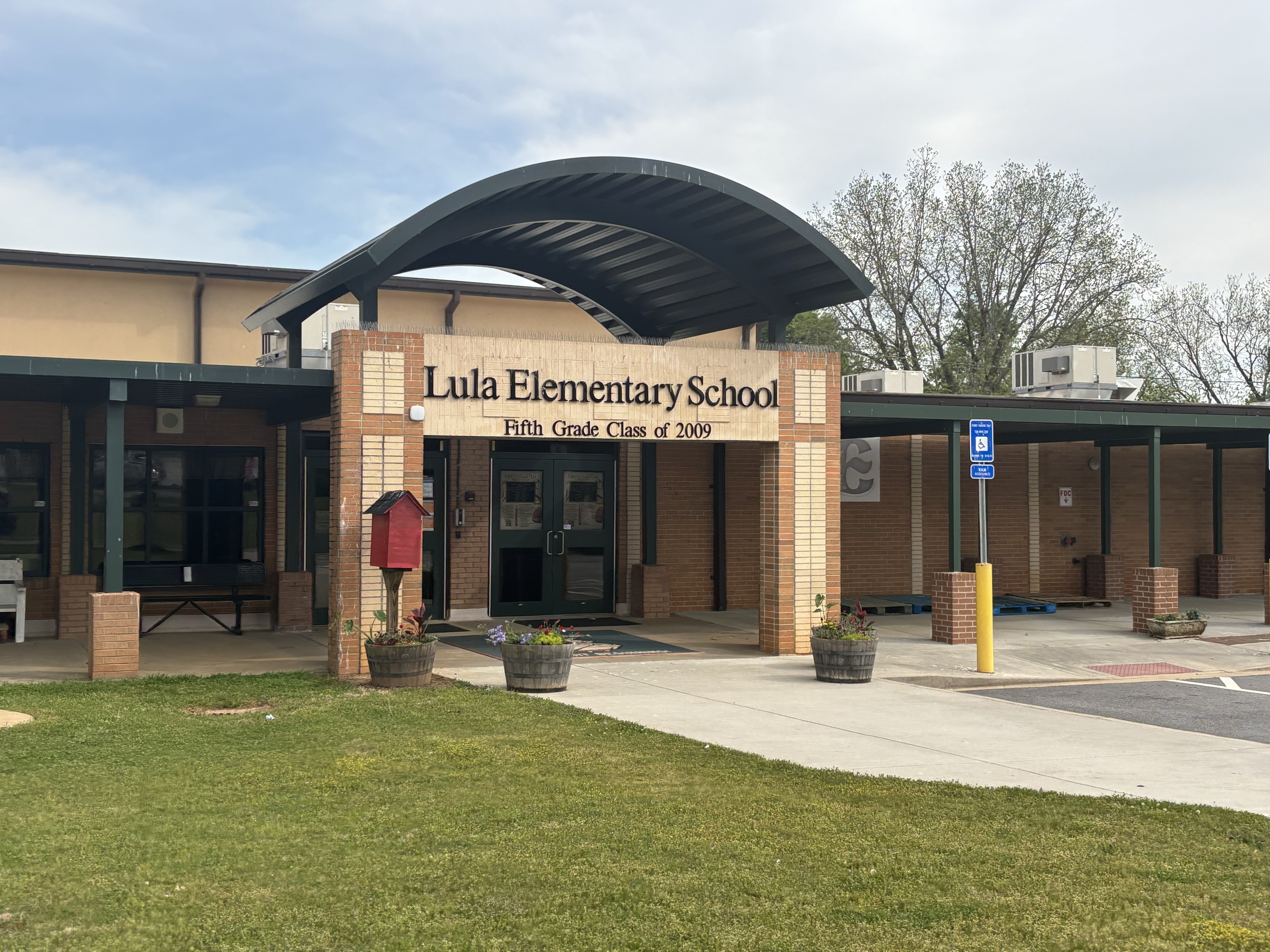
Lula Elementary School

The portion of Lula in Hall County is zoned for the Hall County School District. The Hall County schools with Lula residents are Lula Elementary School, East Hall Middle School, and East Hall High School.

The portion of Lula in Banks County is zoned for the Banks County School District. The Banks County Schools with Lula residents are Banks County Elementary School, Banks County Middle School, and Banks County High School.

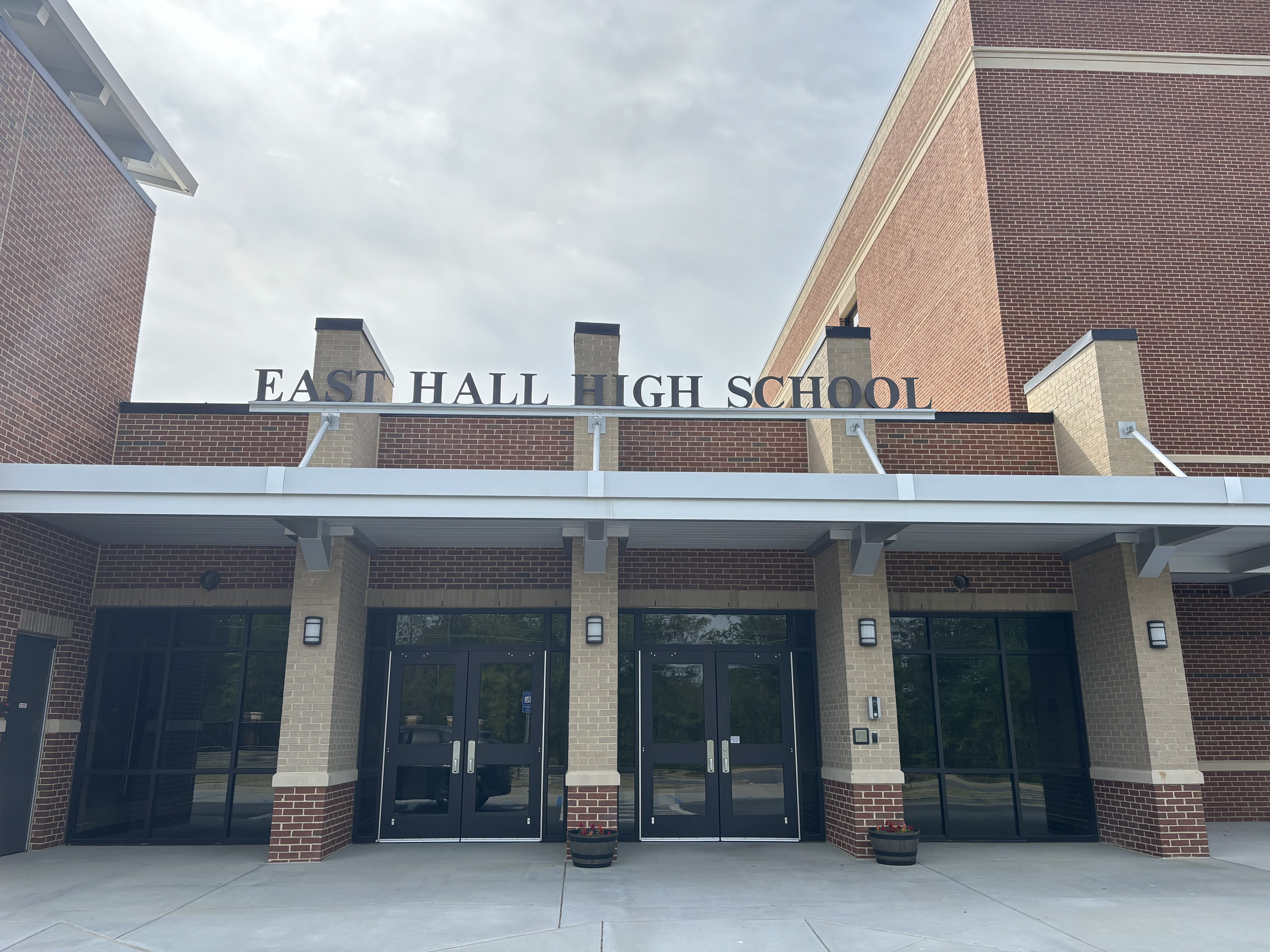
East Hall High School

== Railroad Days Festival ==
A notable event for the town includes Railroad Days, a yearly festival held every May. The Railroad Days Festival began in 1976 to celebrate the history of the city and the railroads that began everything. The festival is thrown and planned by Lula city hall and community members.

Activities for the event includes a parade, entertainment, and local vendors selling goods. The parade takes place on the Saturday morning of the weekend festival. Parade floats are made up of local business and community groups. There can oftentimes be local groups that perform music or dance for entertainment. The rest of the weekend is made up of local vendors setting up booths to sell locally made crafts, gifts, and foods.
