= Banks County, Georgia =

County in Georgia, United States

- County
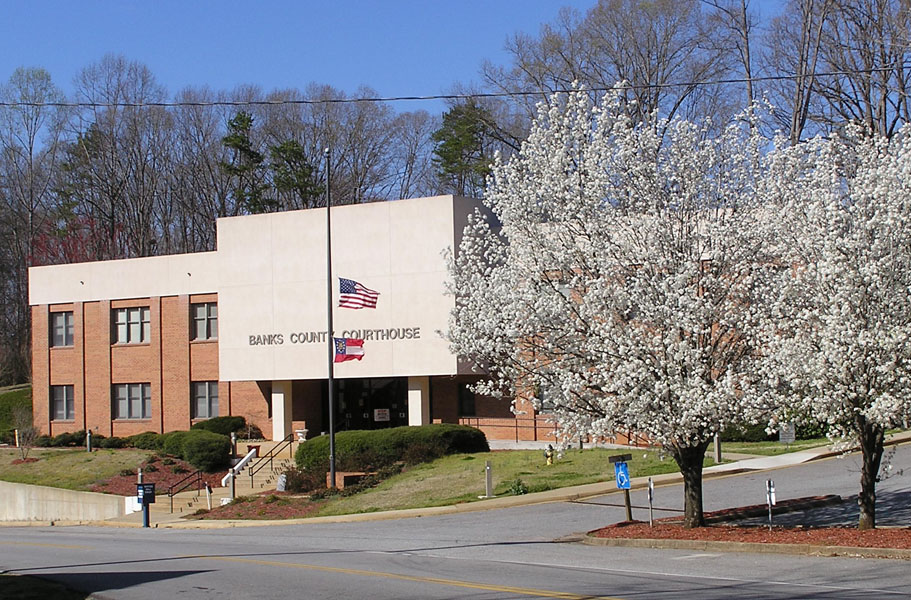
- Banks County courthouse in Homer

- Seal

- Location within the U.S. state of Georgia
- Coordinates: 34°21′N 83°30′W
- Country: United States
- State: Georgia
- Founded: February 1, 1859; 167 years ago
- Named for: Richard Banks
- Seat: Homer

Area
  - Total: 234 sq mi (610 km^{2})
  - Land: 232 sq mi (600 km^{2})
  - Water: 1.8 sq mi (4.7 km^{2}) 0.8%

Population (2020)
  - Total: 18,035
  - Estimate (2025): 21,273 ▲
  - Density: 77.7/sq mi (30.0/km^{2})
- Time zone: UTC−5 (Eastern)
  - Summer (DST): UTC−4 (EDT)
- Congressional district: 9th
- Website: www.bankscountyga.org

Banks County is a county in the Northeast region of the U.S. state of Georgia. As of the 2020 census, the population was 18,035, down from 18,395 in 2010. The county seat is Homer. The Old Banks County Courthouse is located in Homer and listed on the National Register of Historic Places. A new county courthouse was constructed adjacent to the old one in 1983.

== History ==
The law to establish Banks County was passed by the Georgia General Assembly on December 11, 1858. It was named for Dr. Richard E. Banks. The legislation called for the creation of Banks County on February 1, 1859, from Franklin and Habersham counties.

Ty Cobb, a Baseball Hall of Famer, was born in Banks County in 1886 in an area of the county known as The Narrows - a small farming community consisting of fewer than 100 people. The area and birthplace are on State Highway 105 in the northern part of the county near the Broad River. The legal organ for the county is The Banks County News, a member of Mainstreet News, Inc. One of the county's oldest church sites is the Hebron Presbyterian Church, established in 1796. Banks County is the home of the Atlanta Dragway, located near Banks Crossing. Banks County is also known for being the home of the former world's largest Easter egg hunt. (The 50th annual egg hunt in 2009 was the last in the series.)

== Geography ==
According to the U.S. Census Bureau, the county has a total area of 234 square miles (610 km^{2}), of which 232 square miles (600 km^{2}) is land and 1.8 square miles (4.7 km^{2}) (0.8%) is water. Banks County is entirely located in the Broad River sub-basin of the Savannah River basin.

=== Major highways ===
- Interstate 85 / State Route 403 (unsigned)
- U.S. Route 441 / State Route 15
- State Route 51
- State Route 52
- State Route 59
- State Route 63
- State Route 98
- State Route 105
- State Route 164
- State Route 184
- State Route 198
- State Route 323
- State Route 326

=== Adjacent counties ===
- Habersham County - north
- Stephens County - northeast
- Madison County - southeast
- Jackson County - south
- Hall County - west
- Franklin County - east

=== National protected area ===
- Chattahoochee National Forest (part)

== Demographics ==
Historical population
Census	Pop.	Note	%±
1860	4,707		—
1870	4,973		5.7%
1880	7,337		47.5%
1890	8,562		16.7%
1900	10,545		23.2%
1910	11,244		6.6%
1920	11,814		5.1%
1930	9,703		−17.9%
1940	8,733		−10.0%
1950	6,935		−20.6%
1960	6,497		−6.3%
1970	6,833		5.2%
1980	8,702		27.4%
1990	10,308		18.5%
2000	14,422		39.9%
2010	18,395		27.5%
2020	18,035		−2.0%
2025 (est.)	21,273	▲	18.0%
U.S. Decennial Census; 1790-1880 1890-1910; 1920-1930 1930-1940; 1940-1950 1960-1980; 1980-2000 2010; 2020

=== Racial and ethnic composition ===
Banks County, Georgia – Racial and ethnic composition Note: the US Census treats Hispanic/Latino as an ethnic category. This table excludes Latinos from the racial categories and assigns them to a separate category. Hispanics/Latinos may be of any race.
Race / Ethnicity (NH = Non-Hispanic)	Pop 1980	Pop 1990	Pop 2000	Pop 2010	Pop 2020	% 1980	% 1990	% 2000	% 2010	% 2020
White alone (NH)	8,225	9,844	13,256	16,526	15,578	94.52%	95.50%	91.92%	89.84%	86.38%
Black or African American alone (NH)	429	364	459	416	394	4.93%	3.53%	3.18%	2.26%	2.18%
Native American or Alaska Native alone (NH)	11	17	38	36	54	0.13%	0.16%	0.26%	0.20%	0.30%
Asian alone (NH)	4	31	87	165	189	0.05%	0.30%	0.60%	0.90%	1.05%
Native Hawaiian or Pacific Islander alone (NH)	x	x	8	0	8	x	x	0.06%	0.00%	0.04%
Other race alone (NH)	0	0	3	9	28	0.00%	0.00%	0.02%	0.05%	0.16%
Mixed race or Multiracial (NH)	x	x	78	202	620	x	x	0.54%	1.10%	3.44%
Hispanic or Latino (any race)	33	52	493	1,041	1,164	0.38%	0.50%	3.42%	5.66%	6.45%
Total	8,702	10,308	14,422	18,395	18,035	100.00%	100.00%	100.00%	100.00%	100.00%

=== 2020 census ===
As of the 2020 census, the county had a population of 18,035. Of the residents, 22.9% were under the age of 18 and 17.4% were 65 years of age or older; the median age was 40.6 years. For every 100 females there were 102.3 males, and for every 100 females age 18 and over there were 99.4 males. 4.4% of residents lived in urban areas and 95.6% lived in rural areas.

There were 4,875 families residing in the county.

The racial makeup of the county was 87.8% White, 2.2% Black or African American, 0.6% American Indian and Alaska Native, 1.1% Asian, 0.1% Native Hawaiian and Pacific Islander, 2.8% from some other race, and 5.4% from two or more races. Hispanic or Latino residents of any race comprised 6.5% of the population.

There were 6,652 households in the county, of which 33.9% had children under the age of 18 living with them and 20.3% had a female householder with no spouse or partner present. About 20.6% of all households were made up of individuals and 9.8% had someone living alone who was 65 years of age or older.

There were 7,211 housing units, of which 7.8% were vacant. Among occupied housing units, 77.8% were owner-occupied and 22.2% were renter-occupied. The homeowner vacancy rate was 0.9% and the rental vacancy rate was 5.3%.

=== 2010 census ===
As of the 2010 United States census, there were 18,395 people, 6,700 households, and 5,100 families living in the county. The population density was 79.3 inhabitants per square mile (30.6/km^{2}). There were 7,595 housing units at an average density of 32.7 units per square mile (12.6 units/km^{2}). The racial makeup of the county was 91.7% white, 2.3% black or African American, 0.9% Asian, 0.3% American Indian, 3.3% from other races, and 1.4% from two or more races. Those of Hispanic or Latino origin made up 5.7% of the population. In terms of ancestry, 18.7% were American, 8.5% were Irish, and 8.5% were English.

Of the 6,700 households, 36.8% had children under the age of 18 living with them, 60.6% were married couples living together, 10.2% had a female householder with no husband present, 23.9% were non-families, and 20.2% of all households were made up of individuals. The average household size was 2.75 and the average family size was 3.14. The median age was 38.4 years.

The median income for a household in the county was $40,455 and the median income for a family was $48,606. Males had a median income of $41,444 versus $26,998 for females. The per capita income for the county was $19,497. About 13.0% of families and 15.9% of the population were below the poverty line, including 15.9% of those under age 18 and 16.6% of those age 65 or over.

=== 2000 census ===
As of the census of 2000, there were 14,422 people, 5,364 households, and 4,162 families living in the county. The population density was 62 people per square mile (24 people/km^{2}). There were 5,808 housing units at an average density of 25 units per square mile (9.7 units/km^{2}). The racial makeup of the county was 93.16% White, 3.22% Black or African American, 0.30% Native American, 0.60% Asian, 0.06% Pacific Islander, 1.96% from other races, and 0.71% from two or more races. 3.42% of the population were Hispanic or Latino of any race.

There were 5,364 households, out of which 35.60% had children under the age of 18 living with them, 65.40% were married couples living together, 7.90% had a female householder with no husband present, and 22.40% were non-families. 19.20% of all households were made up of individuals, and 7.70% had someone living alone who was 65 years of age or older. The average household size was 2.69 and the average family size was 3.06.

In the county, the population was spread out, with 26.20% under the age of 18, 8.90% from 18 to 24, 30.70% from 25 to 44, 23.70% from 45 to 64, and 10.50% who were 65 years of age or older. The median age was 35 years. For every 100 females there were 102.00 males. For every 100 females age 18 and over, there were 99.70 males.

The median income for a household in the county was $38,523, and the median income for a family was $43,136. Males had a median income of $29,986 versus $21,698 for females. The per capita income for the county was $17,424. About 9.80% of families and 12.50% of the population were below the poverty line, including 14.00% of those under age 18 and 16.30% of those age 65 or over.

== Education ==
The Banks County School District is a public school district that services Banks County, and is based in Homer. There are four schools in the district, which educate 2,788 students in kindergarten through 12th grade.

== Communities ==
=== Cities ===
- Baldwin (partly in Habersham)
- Commerce (partly in Jackson)
- Gillsville (partly in Hall)
- Lula (partly in Hall)

=== Towns ===
- Alto (partly in Habersham)
- Homer
- Maysville (partly in Jackson)

=== Unincorporated communities ===
- Hollingsworth
- Narrows

== Politics ==
Banks County is part of Georgia's 9th congressional district for elections to the United States House of Representatives, currently held by Republican Andrew Clyde since 2021.

Banks County is part of District 32 for elections to the Georgia House of Representatives.

Banks County is part of District 50 for elections to the Georgia State Senate.

United States presidential election results for Banks County, Georgia
Year	Republican		Democratic		Third party(ies)	
Year	No.	%	No.	%	No.	%
1912	83	36.89%	133	59.11%	9	4.00%
1916	118	9.57%	989	80.21%	126	10.22%
1920	342	41.66%	479	58.34%	0	0.00%
1924	86	21.88%	291	74.05%	16	4.07%
1928	363	46.24%	422	53.76%	0	0.00%
1932	58	4.26%	1,283	94.27%	20	1.47%
1936	181	22.02%	641	77.98%	0	0.00%
1940	164	19.57%	668	79.71%	6	0.72%
1944	125	20.19%	490	79.16%	4	0.65%
1948	38	6.35%	533	89.13%	27	4.52%
1952	204	13.98%	1,255	86.02%	0	0.00%
1956	187	15.90%	989	84.10%	0	0.00%
1960	221	15.89%	1,170	84.11%	0	0.00%
1964	548	30.34%	1,258	69.66%	0	0.00%
1968	398	18.70%	296	13.91%	1,434	67.39%
1972	1,336	78.96%	356	21.04%	0	0.00%
1976	330	12.15%	2,387	87.85%	0	0.00%
1980	746	26.01%	2,091	72.91%	31	1.08%
1984	1,549	59.30%	1,063	40.70%	0	0.00%
1988	1,590	61.58%	984	38.11%	8	0.31%
1992	1,551	42.25%	1,530	41.68%	590	16.07%
1996	1,925	47.23%	1,536	37.68%	615	15.09%
2000	3,202	70.64%	1,220	26.91%	111	2.45%
2004	4,410	78.86%	1,149	20.55%	33	0.59%
2008	5,120	81.93%	1,027	16.43%	102	1.63%
2012	5,354	86.30%	780	12.57%	70	1.13%
2016	6,134	87.94%	684	9.81%	157	2.25%
2020	7,795	88.53%	932	10.58%	78	0.89%
2024	9,358	88.96%	1,136	10.80%	25	0.24%

United States Senate election results for Banks County, Georgia2
Year	Republican		Democratic		Third party(ies)	
Year	No.	%	No.	%	No.	%
2020	7,636	87.52%	899	10.30%	190	2.18%
2020	6,612	88.78%	836	11.22%	0	0.00%

United States Senate election results for Banks County, Georgia3
Year	Republican		Democratic		Third party(ies)	
Year	No.	%	No.	%	No.	%
2020	4,710	54.27%	604	6.96%	3,365	38.77%
2020	6,586	88.45%	860	11.55%	0	0.00%
2022	6,362	88.40%	772	10.73%	63	0.88%
2022	5,828	89.30%	698	10.70%	0	0.00%

Georgia Gubernatorial election results for Banks County
Year	Republican		Democratic		Third party(ies)	
Year	No.	%	No.	%	No.	%
2022	6,651	90.79%	607	8.29%	68	0.93%

== See also ==
- National Register of Historic Places listings in Banks County, Georgia
- List of counties in Georgia
