= Gillsville, Georgia =

- City
- Seal

- Location in Banks County and the state of Georgia
- Coordinates: 34°18′10″N 83°37′17″W
- Country: United States
- State: Georgia
- Counties: Hall, Banks

Area
  - Total: 1.95 sq mi (5.05 km^{2})
  - Land: 1.95 sq mi (5.04 km^{2})
  - Water: 0 sq mi (0.00 km^{2})
- Elevation: 925 ft (282 m)

Population (2020)
  - Total: 306
  - Density: 157.2/sq mi (60.68/km^{2})
- Time zone: UTC-5 (Eastern (EST))
  - Summer (DST): UTC-4 (EDT)
- ZIP code: 30543
- Area code: 770
- FIPS code: 13-32860
- GNIS feature ID: 2403697
- Website: townofgillsville.com

Gillsville is a city in Banks and Hall counties in the U.S. state of Georgia. As of the 2020 census, Gillsville had a population of 306.

The Hall County portion of Gillsville is part of the Gainesville, Georgia Metropolitan Statistical Area.

== History ==
The community was named after the local Gills family.

== Geography ==
According to the United States Census Bureau, the city has a total area of 1.1 square miles (2.8 km^{2}), all land.

== Demographics ==
Historical population
Census	Pop.	Note	%±
1910	216		—
1920	225		4.2%
1930	176		−21.8%
1940	157		−10.8%
1950	152		−3.2%
1960	140		−7.9%
1970	100		−28.6%
1980	142		42.0%
1990	113		−20.4%
2000	195		72.6%
2010	235		20.5%
2020	306		30.2%
U.S. Decennial Census

=== 2020 census ===
Gillsville racial composition
Race	Num.	Perc.
White (non-Hispanic)	273	89.22%
Black or African American (non-Hispanic)	4	1.31%
Native American	4	1.31%
Asian	3	0.98%
Other/Mixed	5	1.63%
Hispanic or Latino	17	5.56%

As of the 2020 United States census, there were 306 people, 90 households, and 68 families residing in the city.

The Gillsville population by county breakdown was as follows: 207 in Hall County and 28 in Banks County.

=== 2000 census ===
As of the census of 2000, there were 195 people, 79 households, and 57 families residing in the city. The population density was 171.3 inhabitants per square mile (66.1/km^{2}). There were 90 housing units at an average density of 79.1 units per square mile (30.5 units/km^{2}). The racial makeup of the city was 99.49% White, and 0.51% from two or more races. Hispanic or Latino of any race were 1.54% of the population.

There were 79 households, out of which 30.4% had children under the age of 18 living with them, 67.1% were married couples living together, 5.1% had a female householder with no husband present, and 26.6% were non-families. 21.5% of all households were made up of individuals, and 15.2% had someone living alone who was 65 years of age or older. The average household size was 2.47 and the average family size was 2.91.

In the city, the population was spread out, with 20.0% under the age of 18, 7.7% from 18 to 24, 27.2% from 25 to 44, 25.6% from 45 to 64, and 19.5% who were 65 years of age or older. The median age was 42 years. For every 100 females, there were 93.1 males. For every 100 females age 18 and over, there were 90.2 males.

The median income for a household in the city was $51,500, and the median income for a family was $62,750. Males had a median income of $35,417 versus $28,750 for females. The per capita income for the city was $27,551. None of the families and 3.7% of the population were living below the poverty line, including no under eighteens and 7.5% of those over 64.

== Education ==
The portion in Hall County is in the Hall County School District.

The portion in Banks County is in the Banks County School District. Students there are zoned to Banks County High School.
