= John Holder =

John Holder may refer to:

- John Holder (umpire) (born 1945), English former cricketer and umpire
- John Holder (bishop) (born 1949), Anglican Archbishop of the West Indies
- Ram John Holder (born 1934), British actor
- Sir John Charles Holder, 1st Baronet (1838–1923), of the Holder baronets
- Sir John Eric Duncan Holder, 3rd Baronet (1899–1986), of the Holder baronets
- Sir (John), Henry Holder, 4th Baronet (1928–2020), of the Holder baronets
- John N. Holder, associated with Holder Plantation; longtime owner/editor of The Jackson Herald and candidate for Governor in U.S. state of Georgia

== See also ==
- John Houlder (1916–2012), British engineer
