= Bethlehem, Georgia =

Town in the United States

- Town
- Logo
- Motto: "The little town under the star"
- Location in Barrow County and the state of Georgia
- Coordinates: 33°56′11″N 83°42′38″W
- Country: United States
- State: Georgia
- County: Barrow

Area
  - Total: 2.3186 sq mi (6.0052 km^{2})
  - Land: 2.32 sq mi (6.00 km^{2})
  - Water: 0.0020 sq mi (0.0052 km^{2})
- Elevation: 860 ft (262 m)

Population (2020)
  - Total: 715
  - Density: 309/sq mi (119.2/km^{2})
- Time zone: UTC-5 (Eastern (EST))
  - Summer (DST): UTC-4 (EDT)
- ZIP code: 30620
- Area codes: 770; 404; 678
- FIPS code: 13-07612
- GNIS feature ID: 0331150
- Website: www.bethlehemga.org

Bethlehem is a town in Barrow County in the U.S. state of Georgia. As of the 2020 census, it had a population of 715. The major employer in town is Harrison Poultry, which is the largest non-government employer in Barrow County.

The town was named after a local church, Bethlehem Methodist Church, and has a strong Christmas theme, with many of the street names being references to the nativity of Jesus, such as Mary, Joseph, and Manger. After the introduction of a 1967 stamp in Bethlehem, the town became known as a popular location for sending mail from during the holidays, as the post office sends letters marked "from Bethlehem."

== History ==
The land that Bethlehem and the surrounding Barrow County occupies was originally occupied by Cherokee and Creek tribes. European settlers first arrived in the area in 1786. The Bethlehem Methodist Church was established in 1796 in what would later become Bethlehem. The church opened an adjacent camp ground that was used between 1851 and 1894 which was used as a troop mobilization center during the American Civil War. The Confederate States Army's 16th Georgia Regiment was formed at the camp ground, and the grounds were used as a refugee camp during the war. During the Reconstruction era onwards the camp ground was used for various religious services. A Christian revival meeting was taking place on August 31, 1886, when shockwaves from the 1886 Charleston earthquake were felt at an estimated MMI intensity of 6. The camp ground is now the current location of the Bethlehem Methodist Church, which was built in 1949.

The area was informally established as the community of Bethlehem in December 1883 as a stop along the Belmont – Monroe line of the Gainesville, Jefferson and Southern Railroad. The stop was named after the local Bethlehem Methodist Church. The church itself was named after the ancient town of Bethlehem, identified in the Gospels of Matthew and Luke as the birthplace of Jesus. The railway line was removed in 1946. Bethlehem was incorporated as a town in 1902 by an act of the Georgia General Assembly "under the name and style of the town of Bethlehem". At the time of its incorporation it was part of Walton County, but later became part of the newly formed Barrow County in 1914, which was created using land previously belonging to the nearby Gwinnett, Jackson, and Walton counties.

In 1986 a 13-year-old Bethlehem Elementary School student made national headlines when he stabbed his principal Murray Kennedy to death with a nail file. Because the white principal was killed by a black student, the incident stoked fears of racial conflict in the community, which were addressed by local black and white leaders in the community. The case drew the attention of the Southern Christian Leadership Conference who helped contribute to the student's defense fund. It also drew the attention of the Ku Klux Klan; 65 members of the Ku Klux Klan held a rally in front of the Winder, Georgia courthouse in protest of the murder. Despite the involvement of the KKK, fears of racial tension in the community itself quickly died out. After being charged as an adult, the student was sentenced to 15 years after pleading guilty to voluntary manslaughter.

== Geography ==
Bethlehem is located in southern Barrow County, 4 miles (6.4 km) south of Winder, the county seat. The town is 24.1 miles (38.8 km) west of Athens, Georgia, and 49.1 miles (79.0 km) east of Atlanta. According to the United States Census Bureau, the town has a total area of 2.3 square miles (6.0 km^{2}), with approximately 0.002 square miles (0.0052 km^{2}) of water. The land in and around Bethlehem forms a watershed that flows into the Apalachee River and Marburg Creek, which itself flows into the Apalachee River. Around 76.4% of the land in Bethlehem is used for agriculture or forestry, followed by 14.8% for residential use.

=== Climate ===
The climate of Bethlehem, as with most of the southeastern United States, is humid subtropical (Cfa) according to the Köppen classification, with four seasons including hot, humid summers and cool winters. July is generally the warmest month of the year with an average high of around 90 °F (32 °C). The coldest month is January which has an average high of around 53 °F (12 °C).

Bethlehem receives rainfall distributed evenly throughout the year as typical of southeastern U.S. cities, with March on average having the highest average precipitation at 5.12 inches (130 mm), and May typically being the driest month with 3.17 inches (81 mm).

Climate data for Bethlehem, Georgia (1981–2010)
Month	Jan	Feb	Mar	Apr	May	Jun	Jul	Aug	Sep	Oct	Nov	Dec	Year
Mean daily maximum °F (°C)	53 (12)	58 (14)	66 (19)	74 (23)	81 (27)	88 (31)	90 (32)	89 (32)	83 (28)	74 (23)	65 (18)	55 (13)	73 (23)
Mean daily minimum °F (°C)	31 (−1)	33 (1)	39 (4)	46 (8)	55 (13)	64 (18)	67 (19)	67 (19)	60 (16)	49 (9)	40 (4)	33 (1)	49 (9)
Average precipitation inches (mm)	4.66 (118)	4.46 (113)	5.12 (130)	3.57 (91)	3.17 (81)	4.26 (108)	4.07 (103)	3.95 (100)	4.10 (104)	3.67 (93)	4.01 (102)	3.72 (94)	48.76 (1,237)
Source: US Climate Data

== Demographics ==
Historical population
Census	Pop.	Note	%±
1910	209		—
1920	246		17.7%
1930	209		−15.0%
1940	242		15.8%
1950	240		−0.8%
1960	297		23.8%
1970	304		2.4%
1980	281		−7.6%
1990	348		23.8%
2000	716		105.7%
2010	601		−16.1%
2020	715		19.0%
U.S. Decennial Census

=== 2020 census ===
Bethlehem town, Georgia – Racial and ethnic composition Note: the US Census treats Hispanic/Latino as an ethnic category. This table excludes Latinos from the racial categories and assigns them to a separate category. Hispanics/Latinos may be of any race.
Race / Ethnicity (NH = Non-Hispanic)	Pop 2000	Pop 2010	Pop 2020	% 2000	% 2010	% 2020
White alone (NH)	602	489	531	84.08%	81.36%	74.27%
Black or African American alone (NH)	34	49	43	4.75%	8.15%	6.01%
Native American or Alaska Native alone (NH)	1	2	1	0.14%	0.33%	0.14%
Asian alone (NH)	21	13	13	2.93%	2.16%	1.82%
Pacific Islander alone (NH)	0	0	0	0.00%	0.00%	0.00%
Other Race alone (NH)	0	0	1	0.00%	0.00%	0.14%
Mixed race or Multiracial (NH)	4	7	25	0.56%	1.16%	3.50%
Hispanic or Latino (any race)	54	41	101	7.54%	6.82%	14.13%
Total	716	601	715	100.00%	100.00%	100.00%

As of the census of 2020, there were 715 people, 341 households, and 241 families residing in the town. The population density was 310.9 inhabitants per square mile (120.0/km^{2}). There were 341 housing units at an average density of 148.3 per square mile (57.3/km^{2}). The racial makeup of the town was 74.3% non-Hispanic white, 6.0% non-Hispanic African American, 0% non-Hispanic Native American, 1.8% non-Hispanic Asian, 0.0% non-Hispanic Hawaiian or Pacific Islander, 3.5% non-Hispanic other race, 3.5% non-Hispanic Multiracial, and 14.1% Hispanic or Latino of any race.

There were 341 households, out of which 42.8% had children under the age of 18 living with them, 57.2% were married couples living together, 11.4% had a female householder with no husband present, and 29.3% were non-families. 27.6% of all households were made up of individuals, and 21.7% had someone living alone who was 65 years of age or older. The average household size was 3.06 and the average family size was 3.99.

In the town, the population was spread out, with 32% under the age of 18, 8.7% from 18 to 24, 25.5% from 25 to 44, 16% from 45 to 64, and 17.7% who were 65 years of age or older. The median age was 32.3 years. For every 100 females, there were 118.9 males. The median income for a household in the town was $53,281, and the median income for a family was $59,050. The median income for a non-family household was $38,043. Males had a median income of $30,417 versus $16,250 for females. The per capita income for the town was $21,969. About 2.49% of the population were below the poverty line.

== Economy ==
Bethlehem, as with the rest of Barrow County, has a sales tax of 7%, which is composed of the 4% Georgia state sales tax and a 3% local tax. According to the U.S. Census's American Community Survey 2020 5-year estimate, 57.3% of Bethlehem's population that are 16 years or older are in the labor force. Of these, around 56.26% of the total population being employed, and 1.38% of the total population being unemployed. The largest employer in the town is Harrison Poultry, which opened in Bethlehem in 1958 and is the largest non-government employer in Barrow County with around 1,000 employees.

=== Holiday postal tradition ===
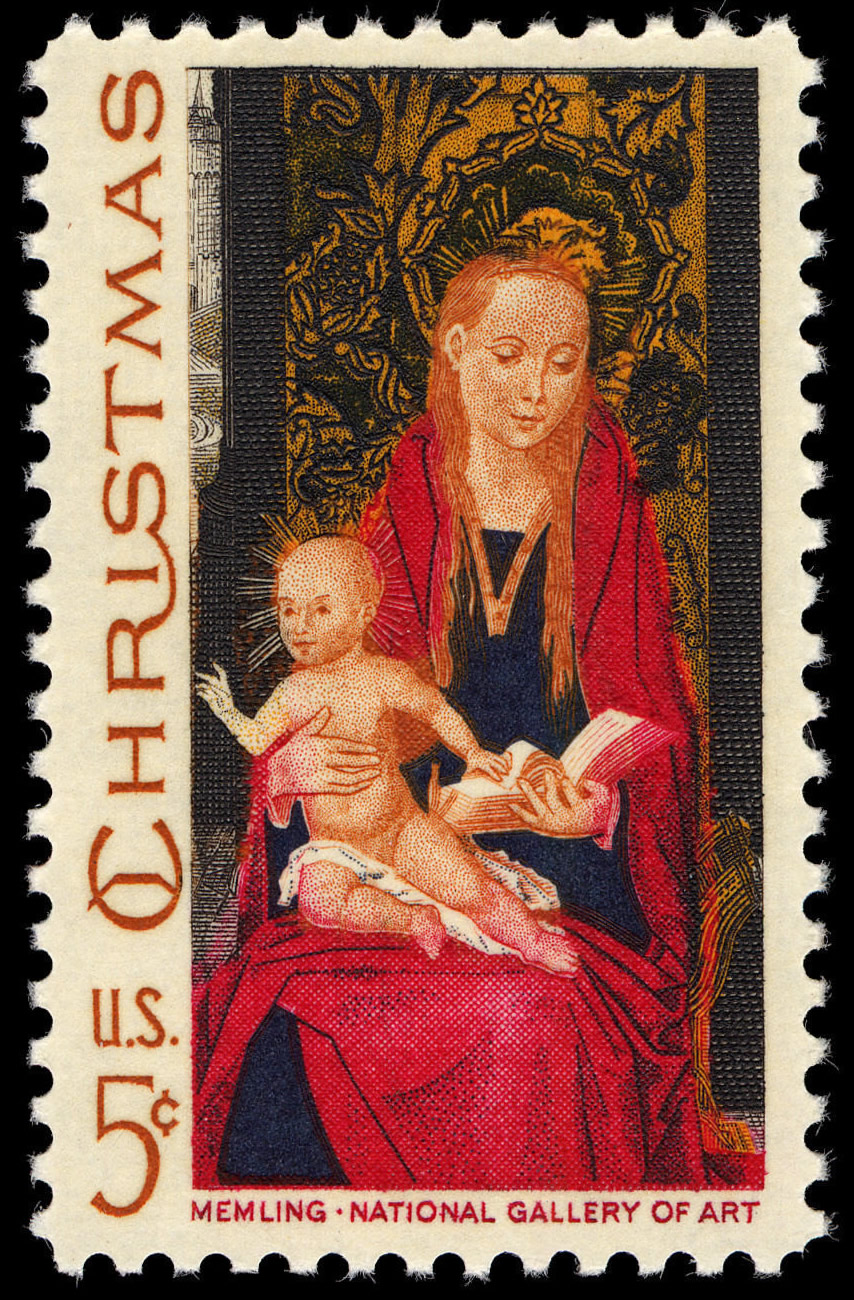
The 1967 US "Madonna and Child" stamp

Bethlehem's post office is popular during the holiday season for sending cards and letters, as mail sent from there will feature Bethlehem's cancellation mark and cachet, so that holiday mail sent will state that it is sent with "Greetings from Bethlehem." This special Bethlehem cancellation mark is made with a stamping machine called a flier canceler. Bethlehem's flier canceler is more than 100 years old and is the only one still in use by the U.S. Postal Service. The Bethlehem post office's special cachet features the Three Wise Men and the Star of Bethlehem.

Traveling to Bethlehem to send holiday mail is a holiday tradition for visitors of the town and the Bethlehem post office sends hundreds of thousands of pieces of mail during each Christmas season. The post office also has hand-stamps that customers can use to stamp "Christmas Greetings from Bethlehem" on their letters and cards before being sent.

The tradition began in 1967, when the United States Postal Service debuted a special Christmas stamp at the Bethlehem post office with a ceremony that included then-governor of Georgia Lester Maddox and Assistant U.S. Postmaster General Richard J. Murphy. While it was the sixth Christmas stamp produced by the US Postal Service, it was the first Christmas stamp to be produced in the larger commemorative size, which is almost twice the size of the previous Christmas stamp. The stamp was a reproduction of Hans Memling's Madonna and Child with Angels. Despite only regularly employing the postmaster and one other part-time employee in a town that at the time had around 350 people, this stamp was requested by so many people that the town's postmaster hired 43 temporary workers to handle the increased workload caused by people sending in their mail to Bethlehem to be re-sent out with the Christmas stamp's first-day-of-issue date of November 6. The Bethlehem post office ultimately sent out around 500,000 cards and letters during the 1967 Christmas season.

== Arts and culture ==
The town operates a library inside City Hall as part of the Piedmont Regional Library System. Bethlehem has no designated historic districts. The nearby Kilgore Mill Covered Bridge and Mill Site (also known as Bethlehem Bridge) was built in 1874 and was listed in the National Register of Historic Places in 1975, and crosses over the Apalachee River, which serves as the boundary between Barrow and Walton counties. Bethlehem hosts an annual nativity pageant during each Christmas season at the town square on Christmas Avenue, below the illuminated large star which represents the Star of Bethlehem. The original star was put in place in 1951 and measured 15 feet (4.6 m) across, and was replaced in 2009 with a star measuring 12 feet (3.7 m) due to excessive rust and nonfunctioning lights on the original.

== Parks and recreation ==
The town has one designated park, the R. Harold Harrison Community Playground, which includes a playground, walking trail, and covered pavilion. The closest state park is Fort Yargo State Park, located approximately 7 miles (11 km) north of Bethlehem in Winder.

== Government ==
When the town was incorporated in 1902 it was established that the town would operate as a civil township under a mayor and five councilmen, each with a term of one year. This government style was reaffirmed by an act passed during a 2004 session of the Georgia General Assembly, which added a town clerk to the council.

In the United States House of Representatives, Bethlehem is part of Georgia's 10th congressional district. For representation in the state government, the town is part of the Georgia State Senate's 47th district, and the 116th district for the Georgia House of Representatives.

== Education ==
Public education for students in Bethlehem is administrated by Barrow County Schools. Bethlehem is part of the Apalachee cluster and is served by Bethlehem Elementary School, Haymon-Morris Middle School, and Apalachee High School. High school students in Bethlehem are also able to apply to attend two college preparatory schools in Barrow County, Sims Academy of Innovation & Technology or the Barrow Arts & Sciences Academy. Snodon Preparatory School was located in Bethlehem until its closure in 2019, and served students from grades 9–12. Following its closure, students in Bethlehem have the option to attend a charter school in Athens known as Foothills Education Charter High School on lottery basis. Bethlehem Christian Academy is a private school located in Bethlehem that serves Pre-K through 12th grade.

== Media ==
As part of the North Georgia area, Bethlehem's primary network-affiliated television stations are WXIA-TV (NBC), WANF (CBS), WSB-TV (ABC), and WAGA-TV (Fox). WGTV is the local station of the statewide Georgia Public Television network and is a PBS member station. Bethlehem is served by the weekly newspaper Barrow News Journal, which also serves as Barrow County's legal organ (also called a "newspaper of public record"). AM radio station WJBB operates their main studio out of Bethlehem.

== Infrastructure ==
=== Transportation ===
Monroe Highway (SR 11) runs through Bethlehem in a north-to-south direction, while intersecting with SR 316 (US 29) inside the town limits, which runs from west-to-east through the town. SR 316 also intersects with SR 81 inside Bethlehem, which also runs north-to-south through the town. Many, but not all, of the street names in Bethlehem are references to the nativity of Jesus and the Bible, including such streets as Angel Street, Joseph Street, Manger Avenue, and Star Street.

The town lacks any form of public transportation and has limited sidewalks for pedestrian use. The nearest airport is the Barrow County Airport in the city of Winder, a small public use airport with two asphalt runways 7 miles (11 km) from Bethlehem. The closest major airports are Athens–Ben Epps Airport, which is 27 miles (43 km) from Bethlehem, and Hartsfield–Jackson Atlanta International Airport, which is 58 miles (93 km) away.

=== Utilities ===
Electricity in the town is provided by Georgia Power, while water utilities are provided by the nearby City of Winder. Unlike the rest of Barrow County which sources its water from the Bear Creek reservoir in Jackson County, Bethlehem and the City of Winder sources its water from three local sources: the Mulberry River, City Pond, and Fort Yargo Lake. Bethlehem contracts directly with a private trash hauling company to handle disposal of solid waste as a free service to residents. In 2019 the mayor of Bethlehem, Sandy McNabb, cited the lack of sewer infrastructure as "the primary reason for the lack of growth in Bethlehem."

=== Healthcare ===
Bethlehem currently has no hospitals inside its town limits. The closest hospital is Northeast Georgia Health System Barrow, also known as NGHS Barrow, which is located in Winder 6 miles (9.7 km) north of downtown Bethlehem. Piedmont Walton is located in Monroe 10.5 miles (16.9 km) south of downtown Bethlehem. In May 2022 the Barrow County Planning Commission approved the construction of a new Northeast Georgia Medical Center facility in Bethlehem.

== Notable people ==
- Jody Hice, the U.S. representative for Georgia's 10th congressional district since 2015.
- Howard W. Odum, American sociologist and author.
