= National Register of Historic Places listings in Jackson County, Georgia =

This is a list of properties and districts in Jackson County, Georgia that are listed on the National Register of Historic Places (NRHP).

This National Park Service list is complete through NPS recent listings posted December 12, 2025.

== Current listings ==
| | Name on the Register | Image | Date listed | Location | City or town | Description |
|---|---|---|---|---|---|---|
| 1 | Braselton Historic District | Braselton Historic District | April 27, 2001 (#01000384) | Jct. of GA 124 and GA 53; 34°06′33″N 83°45′48″W | Braselton | |
| 2 | Commerce Commercial Historic District | Commerce Commercial Historic District | January 19, 1989 (#88003226) | Roughly bounded by Line, State, Cherry, Sycamore and Broad Sts. 34°12′13″N 83°27′24″W | Commerce | |
| 3 | Governor L. G. Hardman House | Governor L. G. Hardman House | June 16, 1988 (#88000749) | 208 Elm St. 34°12′04″N 83°27′22″W | Commerce | |
| 4 | Hillcrest-Allen Clinic and Hospital | Hillcrest-Allen Clinic and Hospital | May 2, 1985 (#85000936) | GA 53 & Peachtree Rd. 34°05′18″N 83°45′29″W | Hoschton | |
| 5 | Holder Plantation | | September 5, 1990 (#90001408) | Jct. of Possum Creek Rd. and US 129; 34°09′03″N 83°37′13″W | Jefferson | |
| 6 | Hoschton Depot | Hoschton Depot | March 31, 2000 (#00000304) | 4276 GA 53; 34°05′49″N 83°45′41″W | Hoschton | |
| 7 | Jackson County Courthouse | Jackson County Courthouse | September 18, 1980 (#80001096) | GA 1; 34°07′06″N 83°34′28″W | Jefferson | |
| 8 | Jefferson Historic District | Jefferson Historic District | March 26, 2003 (#03000137) | Roughly centered on the downtown central business district of Jefferson extending to city limits to NW and SW; 34°07′01″N 83°34′42″W | Jefferson | |
| 9 | Maysville Historic District | Maysville Historic District | September 12, 1985 (#85002203) | Along E. Main, W. Main and Homer Sts. 34°15′17″N 83°33′48″W | Maysville | |
| 10 | Oak Avenue Historic District | | May 30, 2002 (#02000564) | S of jct. of Oak Ave. and the Southern RR; 34°06′36″N 83°34′47″W | Jefferson | |
| 11 | Paradise Cemetery | Paradise Cemetery | May 30, 2002 (#02000563) | E of Southern RR bet. Lawrenceville St. and Mahaffey Circle; 34°07′08″N 83°34′56″W | Jefferson | |
| 12 | Seaborn M. Shankle House | | November 29, 1979 (#79000732) | 125 Cherry St; 34°12′09″N 83°27′18″W | Commerce | |
| 13 | Shields-Etheridge Farm | | June 25, 1992 (#92000814) | Jct. of GA 319 and Co. Rd. 125, approximately 5 mi. SW of Jefferson; 34°04′05″N 83°35′27″W | Jackson | |
| 14 | Talmo Historic District | Talmo Historic District | September 15, 1997 (#97000960) | Roughly along Main St., Kinney Ave., and A.J. Irvin Rd. 34°11′06″N 83°43′13″W | Talmo | |
| 15 | Williamson-Maley-Turner Farm | | July 7, 1995 (#95000823) | GA 15 NE of Jefferson; 34°08′52″N 83°31′10″W | Jefferson | |
