= WJBB =

WJBB may refer to:

- WJBB (AM), a radio station (1300 AM) licensed to serve Winder, Georgia, United States
- WWWH (AM), a defunct radio station (1230 AM) formerly licensed to serve Haleyville, Alabama, United States, which held the call sign WJBB from 1949 to 2011
- WSHF (FM), a radio station (92.7 FM) licensed to serve Haleyville, Alabama, which held the call sign WJBB-FM from 1979 to 2011
