= Stretford by-election =

Stretford by-election may refer to several by-elections in Stretford, north-west England:

- 1901 Stretford by-election, following the death of Sir John Maclure
- 1939 Stretford by-election, following the death of Anthony Crossley
- 2022 Stretford and Urmston by-election, following the appointment of Kate Green as Deputy Mayor of Greater Manchester
