= John Maclure =

John Maclure may refer to:

- Sir John Maclure, 1st Baronet (1835–1901), British businessman and Conservative politician
- John McLure (steamer captain), American steamship captain, boatbuilder, and businessman
- Sir John Edward Stanley Maclure, 2nd Baronet (1869–1938), of the Maclure baronets
- Sir John William Spencer Maclure, 3rd Baronet (1899–1980), of the Maclure baronets
- Sir John Robert Spencer Maclure, 4th Baronet (born 1934), of the Maclure baronets

== See also ==
- John Maclure Community School, British Columbia
