= WWWH =

WWWH could refer to:

- WWWH (AM), a defunct radio station (1230 AM) licensed to Haleyville, Alabama, United States
- WSHF (FM), a radio station (92.7 FM) licensed to Haleyville, Alabama, United States, which held the call sign WWWH-FM from 2011 to 2025
