= Clarksboro =

Clarksboro may refer to:

- Clarksboro, Georgia
- Clarksboro, New Jersey
