= Jefferson Avenue =

Jefferson Avenue may refer to:

- Jefferson Avenue (Detroit), Michigan
- Jefferson Avenue (St. Louis), Missouri
- Jefferson Avenue (Staten Island Railway station), New York

== See also ==
- Jefferson Avenue Historic District (disambiguation)
