= Jefferson Historic District =

Jefferson Historic District may refer to several places in the United States:

Alphabetical by state

- Jefferson Historic District (Jefferson, Alabama), listed on the National Register of Historic Places (NRHP)
- Jefferson Historic District (Jefferson, Georgia), NRHP-listed in Jackson County, Georgia
- Jefferson Historic District (Lafayette, Indiana), NRHP-listed
- Jefferson Historic District (Jefferson, New York), NRHP-listed in Schoharie County, New York
- Jefferson Historic District (Jefferson, Texas), NRHP-listed

== See also ==
- Jefferson Avenue Historic District (disambiguation)
