= Apple Valley =

Apple Valley is the name of six localities in the United States:

- Apple Valley, California, a town
- Apple Valley, Georgia, an unincorporated community
- Apple Valley, Minnesota, a city
- Apple Valley, North Dakota, an unincorporated community
- Apple Valley, Ohio, an unincorporated community
- Apple Valley, Utah, a town
