= Brockton, Georgia =

Unincorporated community in Georgia, U.S.

Coordinates: 34°07′12″N 83°29′41″W

Brockton is an unincorporated community in Jackson County, in the U.S. state of Georgia.

== History ==
The community was named after Charles O. Brock, a local, family doctor.
