= Baron Parmoor =

Barony in the Peerage of the United Kingdom

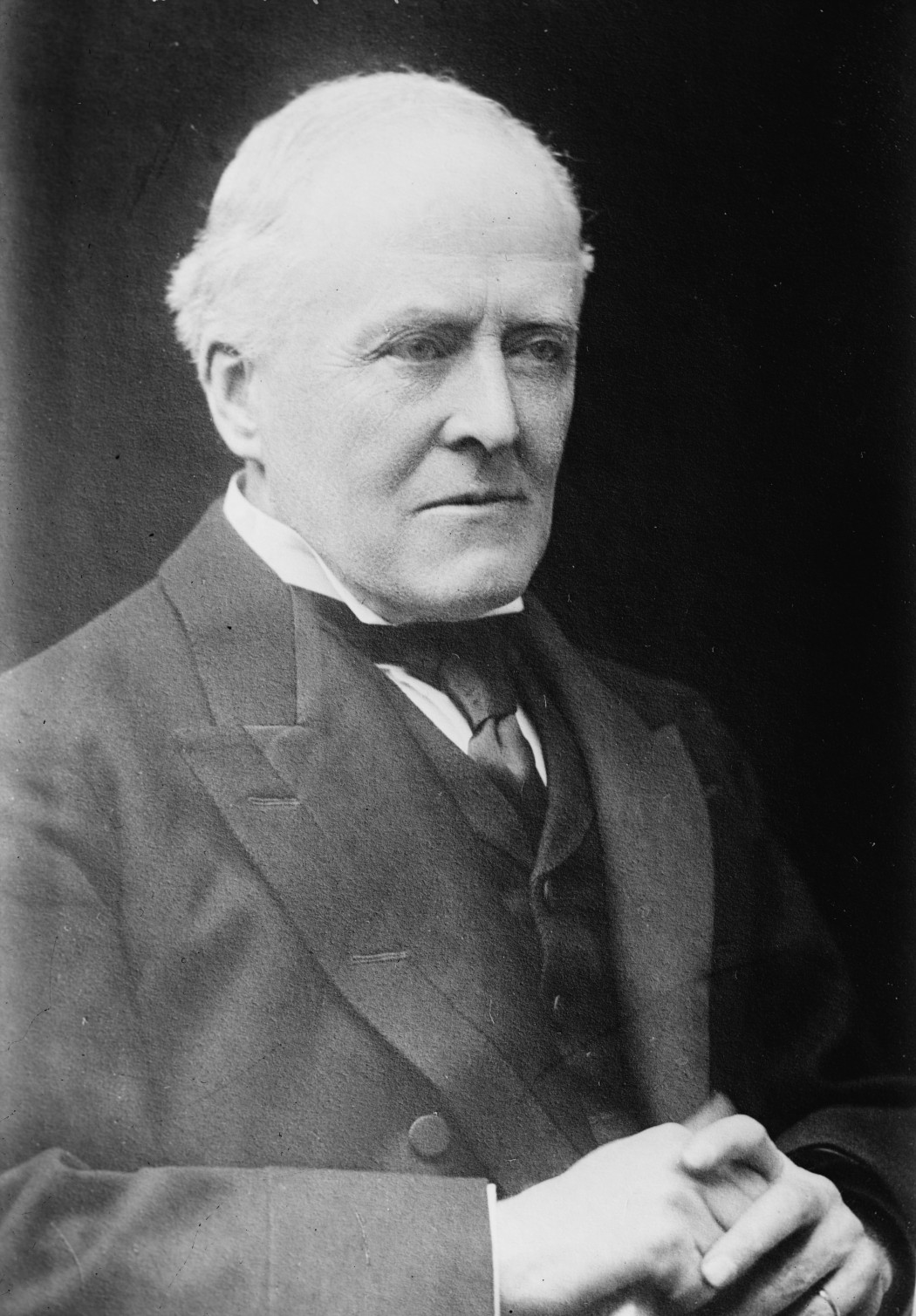
Charles Cripps, 1st Baron Parmoor (1922)

Baron Parmoor, of Frieth in the County of Buckingham, is a title in the Peerage of the United Kingdom. It was created on 16 January 1914 for the lawyer and politician Sir Charles Cripps. He and his second wife, Marian Ellis, were anti-war activists. Two of his sons, the second and third Barons, both succeeded to the title. The third Baron was succeeded by his son, the fourth Baron. As of 2025, the title is held by the latter's first cousin once removed, the sixth Baron, who succeeded in 2025. He is the great grandson of Major the Hon. Leonard Harrison Cripps, the third son of the first Baron.

The Labour politician, The Rt Hon. Sir Stafford Cripps, was the youngest son of the first Baron. Violet, the wife of the third Baron and mother of the fourth Baron, was previously the second wife of the 2nd Duke of Westminster.

The first Baron’s daughter, Ruth Julia Cripps, married Sir Alfred Egerton in 1912, becoming the Hon. Lady Egerton. They had no children but adopted a nephew. She set up and was the chairman of the Women's Advisory Council on Solid Fuels in 1943.

Parmoor House, in Parmoor hamlet near Frieth, Buckinghamshire, was the home of the first Baron Parmoor.

== Barons Parmoor (1914) ==
- Charles Alfred Cripps, 1st Baron Parmoor (1852–1941)
- (Alfred Henry) Seddon Cripps, 2nd Baron Parmoor (1882–1977)
- Frederick Heyworth Cripps, 3rd Baron Parmoor (1885–1977)
- (Frederick Alfred) Milo Cripps, 4th Baron Parmoor (1929–2008)
- (Michael Leonard) Seddon Cripps, 5th Baron Parmoor (1942–2025)
- Henry William Anthony Cripps, 6th Baron Parmoor (born 1976)

The heir apparent is the present holder's son, the Hon. Frederick Michael Seddon Cripps (born 2004).

== Arms ==
Coat of arms of Baron Parmoor
Crest An ostrich's head couped Argent, gorged with a coronet of fleurs-de-lis, and holding in the beak a horseshoe Or. Escutcheon Chequy Ermines and Argent, on a chevron Vert, five horseshoes Or. Supporters On either side, a seahorse Proper, supporting a pennon Ermines charged with a swan rousant Argent, beaked and legged Gules, ducally gorged and lined Or. Motto Fronti Nulla Fides
