= Gustav Renwick =

Major Gustav Adolph Renwick (1883–10 September 1956) was a British industrialist, greyhound and racehorse owner and Conservative politician.

Renwick was born in 1883 in Tynemouth, the fourth son of Sir George Renwick, 1st Baronet. He was educated at Giggleswick School before succeeding his father as chairman of the Manchester Dry Docks Company. He became managing director of Fisher Renwick Manchester-London Steamers Limited and a director of Scammell Lorries Limited.

In 1907 he married Mabel Deuchar, and they had one son. The family home was Holystone Grange, Sharperton, near Morpeth, Northumberland. Renwick was a large landowner and worked to conserve the Coquet Valley near his home.

His sporting interests dated from 1906, when he first competed at coursing events. He became a breeder of greyhounds and one of his dogs, Holystone Lifelong, won the Waterloo Cup in 1953. He became a racehorse owner in 1950.

From 1931 to 1935 Renwick was National Conservative Member of Parliament for the Stretford constituency.

Gustav Renwick died in hospital in Newcastle upon Tyne on 10 September 1956.

Parliament of the United Kingdom
Preceded by Thomas Robinson	Member of Parliament for Stretford; 1931–1935	Succeeded by Anthony Crossley
