= Ralph Etherton =

Member of Parliament for Stretford
- In office 8 December 1939 – 15 June 1945
- Preceded by: Anthony Crossley
- Succeeded by: Herschel Lewis Austin
- Majority: 18,984

Personal details
- Born: 11 February 1904
- Died: 10 December 1987 (aged 83)
- Party: Conservative
- Education: Trinity Hall, Cambridge
- Military career
- Allegiance: United Kingdom
- Branch: Royal Air Force
- Service years: 1944-1945
- Rank: Flight Lieutenant
- Conflicts: World War II

Ralph Humphrey Etherton (11 February 1904 – 10 December 1987) was a British barrister and Conservative politician. He was the son of Captain Louis Etherton. He was educated at Charterhouse School and Trinity Hall, Cambridge, and was called to the Bar in 1926.

He became involved in Conservative politics, failing to win a parliamentary seat at Everton, Liverpool in 1935. In 1937, he unsuccessfully stood for election to the London County Council as a Municipal Reform Party candidate. Two tears later, the 1939 Stretford by-election was caused by the death of Anthony Crossley, Member of Parliament for Stretford. Etherton won the contest and was elected to the seat.

Etherton joined the Royal Air Force, rising from the rank of Pilot Officer to Flight Lieutenant. On 15 December 1944, he married Johanne Cloherty in St Mary Undercroft, the crypt chapel of the Palace of Westminster. He met his future wife while she was Charles de Gaulle's diplomatic driver.

He lost his parliamentary seat at the 1945 general election. He retired from active politics and pursued a career in business. He died in December 1987, aged 83.

Parliament of the United Kingdom
Preceded by Anthony Crossley	Member of Parliament for Stretford; 1939 –1945	Succeeded by Herschel Lewis Austin
