= Jackson County, Georgia =

County in Georgia, United States

- County
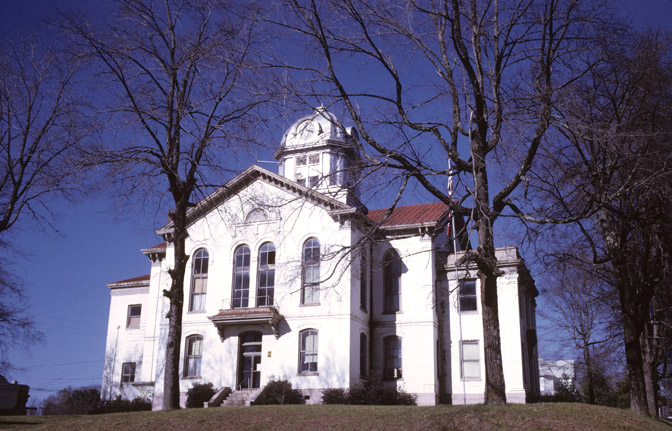
- Jackson County courthouse in Jefferson

- Seal

- Location within the U.S. state of Georgia
- Coordinates: 34°08′N 83°34′W
- Country: United States
- State: Georgia
- Founded: 1796; 230 years ago
- Named for: James Jackson
- Seat: Jefferson
- Largest city: Jefferson

Area
  - Total: 343 sq mi (890 km^{2})
  - Land: 340 sq mi (880 km^{2})
  - Water: 3.4 sq mi (8.8 km^{2}) 1.0%

Population (2020)
  - Total: 75,907
  - Estimate (2025): 99,265 ▲
  - Density: 220/sq mi (86/km^{2})
- Time zone: UTC−5 (Eastern)
  - Summer (DST): UTC−4 (EDT)
- Congressional district: 9th
- Website: jacksoncountygov.com

Jackson County is a county located in the East Central region of the U.S. state of Georgia. As of the 2020 census, the population was 75,907. The county seat is Jefferson. Jackson County comprises the Jefferson, GA Micropolitan Statistical Area, which is included in the Atlanta-Athens-Clarke County-Sandy Springs, GA Combined Statistical Area.

== History ==
Most of the first non-Native American settlers came from Effingham County in 1786. On February 11, 1796, Jackson County was split off from part of Franklin County, Georgia. The new county was named in honor of Revolutionary War Lieutenant Colonel, Congressman, Senator and Governor James Jackson. The county originally covered an area of approximately 1,800 square miles (4,662.0 km^{2}), with Clarksboro as its first county seat.

In 1801, the Georgia General Assembly granted 40,000 acres (160 km^{2}) of land in Jackson County for a state college. Franklin College (now University of Georgia) began classes the same year, and the city of Athens was developed around the school. Also the same year, a new county was developed around the new college town, and Jackson lost territory to the new Clarke. The county seat was moved to an old Indian village called Thomocoggan, a location with ample water supply from Curry Creek and four large springs. In 1804, the city was renamed Jefferson, after Thomas Jefferson.

Jackson lost more territory in 1811 in the creation of Madison County, in 1818 in the creation of Walton, Gwinnett, and Hall counties, in 1858 in the creation of Banks County, and in 1914 in the creation of Barrow County.

The first county courthouse, a log and wooden frame building with an attached jail, was built on south side of the public square; a second, larger, two-story brick courthouse with a separate jailhouse was built in 1817. In 1880, a third was built on a hill north of the square. This courthouse was the oldest continuously operating courthouse in the United States until 2004, when the current courthouse was constructed north of Jefferson.

== Geography ==
According to the U.S. Census Bureau, the county has a total area of 343 square miles (890 km^{2}), of which 340 square miles (880 km^{2}) is land and 3.4 square miles (8.8 km^{2}) (1.0%) is water.

The vast majority of Jackson County is located in the Upper Oconee River sub-basin of the Altamaha River basin, with just a small portion of the county's northern edge, between Maysville to just east of Commerce, located in the Broad River sub-basin of the Savannah River basin.

=== Rivers and creeks ===
- North Oconee River
  - Sandy Creek (Georgia)
  - Curry Creek
- Middle Oconee River
  - Pond Fork
  - Allen Creek (Holders Creek)
- Mulberry River

=== Adjacent counties ===
- Banks County - north
- Madison County - east
- Clarke County - southeast
- Barrow County - west
- Hall County - northwest

== Communities ==
=== Cities ===
- Arcade
- Commerce
- Hoschton
- Jefferson
- Nicholson
- Pendergrass

=== Towns ===
- Braselton (partly in Gwinnett, Barrow and Hall)
- Maysville (partly in Banks)
- Talmo

=== Unincorporated communities ===
- Apple Valley
- Attica
- Brockton
- Center
- Clarksboro

== Demographics ==
Historical population
Census	Pop.	Note	%±
1800	7,736		—
1810	10,569		36.6%
1820	8,355		−20.9%
1830	9,004		7.8%
1840	8,522		−5.4%
1850	9,768		14.6%
1860	10,605		8.6%
1870	11,181		5.4%
1880	16,297		45.8%
1890	19,176		17.7%
1900	24,039		25.4%
1910	30,169		25.5%
1920	24,654		−18.3%
1930	21,609		−12.4%
1940	20,089		−7.0%
1950	18,997		−5.4%
1960	18,499		−2.6%
1970	21,093		14.0%
1980	25,343		20.1%
1990	30,005		18.4%
2000	41,589		38.6%
2010	60,485		45.4%
2020	75,907		25.5%
2025 (est.)	99,265	▲	30.8%
U.S. Decennial Census; 1790-1880 1890-1910; 1920-1930 1930-1940; 1940-1950 1960-1980; 1980-2000 2010

=== Racial and ethnic composition ===
Jackson County, Georgia – Racial and ethnic composition Note: the US Census treats Hispanic/Latino as an ethnic category. This table excludes Latinos from the racial categories and assigns them to a separate category. Hispanics/Latinos may be of any race.
Race / Ethnicity (NH = Non-Hispanic)	Pop 1980	Pop 1990	Pop 2000	Pop 2010	Pop 2020	% 1980	% 1990	% 2000	% 2010	% 2020
White alone (NH)	22,411	26,830	36,314	50,695	59,064	88.43%	89.42%	87.32%	83.81%	77.81%
Black or African American alone (NH)	2,722	2,900	3,197	4,050	5,136	10.74%	9.67%	7.69%	6.70%	6.77%
Native American or Alaska Native alone (NH)	21	60	72	91	127	0.08%	0.20%	0.17%	0.15%	0.17%
Asian alone (NH)	15	50	397	1,026	1,744	0.06%	0.17%	0.95%	1.70%	2.30%
Native Hawaiian or Pacific Islander alone (NH)	x	x	1	12	30	x	x	0.00%	0.02%	0.04%
Other race alone (NH)	1	5	14	59	294	0.00%	0.02%	0.03%	0.10%	0.39%
Mixed race or Multiracial (NH)	x	x	345	816	2,800	x	x	0.83%	1.35%	3.69%
Hispanic or Latino (any race)	173	160	1,249	3,736	6,712	0.68%	0.53%	3.00%	6.18%	8.84%
Total	25,343	30,005	41,589	60,485	75,907	100.00%	100.00%	100.00%	100.00%	100.00%

=== 2020 census ===
As of the 2020 census, there were 75,907 people in the county. The median age was 38.2 years, 25.6% of residents were under the age of 18, and 15.0% were 65 years of age or older. For every 100 females there were 97.3 males, and for every 100 females age 18 and over there were 94.7 males age 18 and over. 37.2% of residents lived in urban areas, while 62.8% lived in rural areas.

The racial makeup of the county was 79.7% White, 6.9% Black or African American, 0.3% American Indian and Alaska Native, 2.3% Asian, 0.1% Native Hawaiian and Pacific Islander, 4.1% from some other race, and 6.6% from two or more races. Hispanic or Latino residents of any race comprised 8.8% of the population.

As of the 2020 census, there were 26,174 households in the county, including 19,467 families; 39.0% had children under the age of 18 living with them and 20.8% had a female householder with no spouse or partner present. About 18.2% of all households were made up of individuals and 8.4% had someone living alone who was 65 years of age or older.

There were 27,699 housing units, of which 5.5% were vacant. Among occupied housing units, 80.0% were owner-occupied and 20.0% were renter-occupied. The homeowner vacancy rate was 1.6% and the rental vacancy rate was 5.6%.

== Law and government ==
Jackson County Board of Commissioners
Commission post	Office holder
Chairman	Marty Clark (Jackson County, Georgia)
District 1 - Central Jackson	Jim Hix
District 2 - North Jackson	Chas Hardy
District 3 - West Jackson	Ralph Richardson Jr.
District 4 - East Jackson	Marty Seagraves

== Politics ==
United States presidential election results for Jackson County, Georgia
Year	Republican		Democratic		Third party(ies)	
Year	No.	%	No.	%	No.	%
1912	46	2.65%	1,123	64.65%	568	32.70%
1916	71	5.23%	1,185	87.26%	102	7.51%
1920	334	23.81%	1,069	76.19%	0	0.00%
1924	142	11.70%	993	81.80%	79	6.51%
1928	818	48.78%	859	51.22%	0	0.00%
1932	80	5.39%	1,389	93.54%	16	1.08%
1936	187	7.09%	2,447	92.76%	4	0.15%
1940	166	9.37%	1,599	90.29%	6	0.34%
1944	221	11.19%	1,754	88.81%	0	0.00%
1948	145	6.53%	1,866	83.98%	211	9.50%
1952	409	10.91%	3,341	89.09%	0	0.00%
1956	438	12.38%	3,100	87.62%	0	0.00%
1960	472	11.44%	3,653	88.56%	0	0.00%
1964	1,664	29.62%	3,953	70.38%	0	0.00%
1968	1,139	18.52%	1,537	25.00%	3,473	56.48%
1972	4,124	79.63%	1,055	20.37%	0	0.00%
1976	1,239	17.28%	5,931	82.72%	0	0.00%
1980	2,209	31.79%	4,591	66.07%	149	2.14%
1984	4,202	60.73%	2,717	39.27%	0	0.00%
1988	4,407	62.56%	2,607	37.00%	31	0.44%
1992	3,976	43.38%	3,792	41.37%	1,397	15.24%
1996	4,782	50.38%	3,746	39.46%	964	10.16%
2000	7,878	67.71%	3,420	29.39%	337	2.90%
2004	12,611	77.84%	3,468	21.40%	123	0.76%
2008	17,776	77.23%	4,950	21.51%	290	1.26%
2012	19,135	80.59%	4,238	17.85%	372	1.57%
2016	21,784	79.44%	4,491	16.38%	1,146	4.18%
2020	29,502	78.29%	7,642	20.28%	541	1.44%
2024	36,497	77.25%	10,472	22.17%	274	0.58%

United States Senate election results for Jackson County, Georgia2
Year	Republican		Democratic		Third party(ies)	
Year	No.	%	No.	%	No.	%
2020	29,166	78.02%	7,262	19.43%	955	2.55%
2020	25,793	79.17%	6,785	20.83%	0	0.00%

United States Senate election results for Jackson County, Georgia3
Year	Republican		Democratic		Third party(ies)	
Year	No.	%	No.	%	No.	%
2020	14,914	40.14%	4,783	12.87%	17,459	46.99%
2020	25,658	78.75%	6,925	21.25%	0	0.00%
2022	24,379	76.89%	6,504	20.51%	823	2.60%
2022	21,613	78.69%	5,854	21.31%	0	0.00%

Georgia Gubernatorial election results for Jackson County
Year	Republican		Democratic		Third party(ies)	
Year	No.	%	No.	%	No.	%
2022	26,223	82.25%	5,420	17.00%	238	0.75%

As of the 2020s, Jackson County is a strongly Republican voting county. For elections to the United States House of Representatives, Jackson County is part of Georgia's 10th congressional district, currently represented by Mike Collins. For elections to the Georgia State Senate, Jackson County is divided between districts 47 and 50. For elections to the Georgia House of Representatives, Jackson County is part of districts 119 and 120.

== Education ==
Most of the county is in the Jackson County School District. Portions in Commerce and Jefferson are in, respectively, Commerce City School District and Jefferson City School District.

== Attractions ==
- Chateau Elan (Braselton)
- La Vaquita Flea Market (Pendergrass)
- Mayfield Dairy Visitors Center (Braselton)
- Sandy Creek Golf Course (Commerce)
- Tanger Outlet Center (Commerce)

=== National historic places ===
- Braselton Historic District
- Commerce Commercial Historic District
- Governor L. G. Hardman House (Commerce)
- Hillcrest-Allen Clinic and Hospital (Hoschton)
- Holder Plantation (Jefferson)
- Hoschton Depot
- Old Jackson County Courthouse (Jefferson)
- Jefferson Historic District
- Oak Avenue Historic District(Jefferson)
- Paradise Cemetery (Jefferson)
- Seaborn M. Shankle House (Commerce)
- Shields-Etheridge Farm
- Talmo Historic District
- Williamson-Maley-Turner Farm (Jefferson)

=== Parks and cultural institutions ===
- Crawford W. Long Museum (Jefferson)
- Hurricane Shoals Park

=== Events ===
- Daisy Festival - May (first full weekend) (Nicholson)
- Mule Days - May (Shields-Etheridge Farm)
- Annual City Lights Festival - mid-June (Commerce)
- Celebrate Braselton - July 4 (Braselton)
- Art in the Park - mid-September (Hurricane Shoals)
- Annual Fall Festival - September (last weekend) (Hoschton)

== Transportation ==
=== Major highways ===
- Interstate 85 / State Route 403 (unsigned)
- U.S. Route 129
  - U.S. Route 129 Business
- U.S. Route 441 / State Route 15
  - U.S. Route 441 Business
  - State Route 15 Alternate
- State Route 11
  - State Route 11 Business
  - State Route 11 Connector
- State Route 53
- State Route 59
- State Route 60
- State Route 82
  - State Route 82 Connector
- State Route 98
- State Route 124
- State Route 330
- State Route 332
- State Route 334
- State Route 335
- State Route 346 (former)

=== Pedestrians and cycling ===
- Fox Smallwood Dr Trail
- American Veterans Memorial Park Trail
- Commerce Middle School Track
- Curry Creek Reservoir Trail
- Jefferson Memorial Stadium Track
- East Jackson Park Walking Trail
- South Jackson Elementary Nature Trail & Walking Track
- Hurricane Shoals Nature Trail
- Sells Mill Nature Trail
- Sandy Creek Park Walking Trail
- Braselton Riverwalk Trail
- East Jackson High School Track
- W Jackson Middle School Track
- West Jackson Park Walking Track
- Jackson County High School Track & Nature Trail

== See also ==
- National Register of Historic Places listings in Jackson County, Georgia
- List of counties in Georgia
