= The Jackson Herald =

Newspaper in Jefferson County, Georgia, U.S.

- "Jackson County's Legal Organ"
- Type: Weekly Newspaper
- Format: Printed & E-version
- Owner(s): MainStreet Newspapers, Inc
- Founder: Herman Buffington
- Publisher: Mike and Scott Buffington
- Founded: July 21, 1875; 144 years ago
- Language: English
- Headquarters: 33 Lee St.Jefferson, GA 30549
- Country: United States
- Circulation: 4,781 (as of 2013)
- Sister newspapers: MainStreetNewsSports; MainStreetNewsOrbits; BarrowJournal; BraseltonNewsTODAY; BanksNewsTODAY; CommerceNewsTODAY; MadisonJournalTODAY
- OCLC number: 19638930
- Website: jacksonheraldtoday.com

The Jackson Herald is a local newspaper in Jackson County, Georgia, United States. It is published once a week, on Wednesdays, and is owned by MainStreet Newspapers, Inc. Its contents include local news, sports and events.

== History ==
The paper began as the Forest News, founded in 1875, published by the Jackson County Publishing Company and run by Malcolm Stafford. A Democratic paper devoted to "State Rights and State Sovereignty", it quickly became the county's legal organ. Stafford managed and edited the paper until 1878, when he turned the management portion over to J.N. Wilson. Editorship was handed over to business manager Robert S. Howard in 1878, a position he would hold for seven years. After his departure in early 1885, the News went through several changes in leadership—and was renamed to the Jackson Herald—before John N. Ross purchased it in 1886. Ross brought his father and brother onboard as well. Only three years later, the paper was sold again, to Bourbon Democrats J.H. Williamson and W.H. Craig.

=== The Holders ===
In 1891 The Jackson Herald was bought by John N. Holder for $3000; he would become the paper's longest-running editor. Mr. and Mrs. Holder were given the Herald by Holder's father, the owner of Holder Plantation and son of one of the Jackson County Publishing Company founders, as a wedding present. The old ownership had been "somewhat unfriendly" to the Farmers' Alliance, and this new ownership was expected to be friendly towards the Alliance. The couple ran the paper together for many years; Mrs. Holder wrote the social column and took over editorship when John was away.

Holder was also extensively involved in politics from 1898-1932. Initially a representative for Jefferson, he "was Speaker of the Georgia House of Representatives twice and for many years chairman of the State Highway Board" and a five-time candidate for Governor of the state.

A permanent home for the newspaper, the Jackson Herald Building, on Lee St. in Jefferson, was built around 1925. It is listed on the National Register of Historic Places as a contributing building in the Jefferson Historic District. Though the Holders retired from editing in the 20th century, they maintained ownership into the 1950s.

=== Herman Abner Buffington ===
Herman Abner Buffington ( May 7, 1926 – July 13, 2014) was a popular newspaper reporter in Georgia and a highly decorated World War II Combat Veteran. He was born in the town of Rome, Floyd County, Georgia to the late Abner Curenius and Essie Green Buffington.

Before entering the newspaper business, Mr. Buffington already had already created a legacy in the United States WWII Army. He first joined the US Army in August 1944 and was stationed in the 96th Infantry Division, which primarily focused on the Pacific Theater. His service to this country earned him numerous awards including the Bronze Star, the Purple Heart, the Asiatic-Pacific Theater Ribbon, the Philippine Independence Ribbon, the Good Conduct Medal, the Victory Ribbon and three overseas service bars.

After returning to the United States, he met Helen Toles and they soon got married 1949. Mr. Buffington used the GI Bill as an opportunity to enroll in the Carrol Lynn School of Business and the Rome branch of the University of Georgia. After his graduation, he worked for Vic's Goodyear Tire, Bradshaw Tire Company, the Celanese Cooperation and Peppered Mfg Company. His first real Job in Journalism was with the Summerville News in Northwest Georgia, where he worked alongside his wife as an advertising and circulation director. Subsequently, after working for The Summerville News, he launched MainStreetNewspapers Inc. and served as the director of the Georgia Press association (1982–1985).

The Jackson Herald was purchased by Herman Buffington in 1965. Mr. Buffington served as the newspaper's publisher while his wife, Helen Buffington, was the editor. They were the entire staff; they performed all of the tasks of delivering a newspaper. The Buffingtons were in the business for years and famous for using the newspaper as a tool to eradicate the prevalent corruption and organized crime in Jackson County.

The first edition was printed on July 21, 1965, containing only ten pages. In later years, the newspaper's circulation trended upward.

In 1968, Mr. Buffington inaugurated The Banks County News in Homer County, and in 1987, he purchased the Commerce News. He then proceeded to purchase The Madison County Journal in 1997. Mr. Buffington then merged all the newspapers under the name MainStreet Newspapers, Inc.

Due to his deteriorating health, he was later forced to retire from the newspaper business. Mr. Buffington still retained his presidential position even though his sons took over the daily operations of the company.

=== Recently ===
On 1 January 2017, the Commerce News was assimilated into the Jackson Herald to create a single paper. As of 2019 The Jackson Herald is one of several newspapers run by the still family-owned MainStreet Newspapers, Inc.

== Coverage ==
The Jackson Herald covers Jackson County. Which includes the towns of Jefferson, Commerce, Pendergrass, Nicholson, Maysville, Arcade and Talmo in Georgia. The newspaper currently has a circulation estimate of 7,446 copies. It is published once a week, on Wednesday.

== See also ==
- Jackson County, Georgia
- List of newspapers in Georgia
- List of newspapers in the United States
