= Maclure baronets =

Baronetcy in the Baronetage of the United Kingdom

- Escutcheon of the Maclure baronets of The Home
- Creation date: 1898
- Status: extant
- Motto: Paratus sum, I am ready

The Maclure Baronetcy, of The Home in Whalley Range near Manchester in the County Palatine of Lancaster, is a title in the Baronetage of the United Kingdom. It was created on 12 March 1898 for John William Maclure. He was Secretary of the Famine Relief Fund from 1862 to 1865 and sat as Conservative Member of Parliament for Stretford between 1886 and 1901.

== Maclure baronets, of The Home (1898) ==
- Sir John William Maclure, 1st Baronet (1835–1901)
- Sir John Edward Stanley Maclure, 2nd Baronet (1869–1938)
- Sir John William Spencer Maclure, 3rd Baronet (1899–1980)
- Sir John Robert Spencer Maclure, 4th Baronet (born 1934)

The heir apparent to the baronetcy is (John) Mark Maclure (born 1965), eldest son of the 4th Baronet.

Baronetage of the United Kingdom
Preceded by Holder baronets	Maclure baronets of The Home; 12 March 1898	Succeeded by de La Rue baronets
