= Thomas Robinson (Stretford MP) =

English industrialist, Liberal politician and Member of Parliament

Sir Thomas Robinson, circa 1924

Sir Thomas Robinson KBE JP (2 January 1864 – 30 December 1953) was an English industrialist, Liberal politician and Member of Parliament, who late in his career sat in the House of Commons as an Independent.

== Birth and family ==
He was born at King Street, Stretford, Manchester. He was the sixth child of Peter Robinson, a farm labourer/lamplighter, and Eliza (née Owen).

He was married twice. First, to Emma Lowe of Stretford in January 1887, and second, in November 1936 he married Emmeline Mary Standring, also of Stretford. He had no children from either marriage. In religion he was an independent Methodist.

== Business career ==
Robinson had interests in the dyeing trade, which had strong connections to the Lancashire textile industry. He was a director of the Bradford Dyers Association Ltd and Chairman of the Allied Trades, Bleaching, Dyeing and Printing Industries of Lancashire, Cheshire and Yorkshire. He also held appointments as the nominee of the Federation of British Industries. He was instrumental, together with ICI, in the design and development of the nylon/polyester futuristic spun fabric "MORADA" which proved ideal for lining garments. It is estimated that around 1,700,000,000 garments were made with linings sold under the brand name Morada. He provided essential initial funding to build the first Maternity Hospital in Stretford.

== Politics ==
=== Party affiliation ===
Robinson was mostly identified with the Liberal Party, but was successful in Parliamentary politics through a Liberal-Conservative pact and stood under the title Independent Free Trade and Anti-Socialist. He was always identified by the Liberal Party as a representative of the party, even at the 1924 general election, when he chose to describe himself as a Constitutionalist. The Constitutionalist label was one used by a number of candidates; many were Liberals or ex-Liberals like Winston Churchill. The Constitutionalists did not function as a party but fielded candidates in 1924 in constituencies where local Conservative and Liberal Associations collaborated against socialism. Many ended up in the Conservative Party, but Robinson preferred to continue to receive the Liberal whip up until the 1929 general election, when he stood formally as an Independent.

=== Local politics ===
Robinson started his political career in local government and administration. He was first elected to the Stretford Urban District Council in 1894. He was later elected as Chairman of the Council. He sat as Chairman of the Stretford Hundred Licensing Committee from 1916 to 1941 and was Chairman of the Manchester Port Sanitary Committee after 1927. In 1933, he became the first Mayor of Stretford when the borough gained its Charter of Incorporation. He sat as mayor again in 1944–1945 and was also an Alderman. In 1937 he was awarded the Freedom of the Borough of Stretford.

=== Parliament ===
Robinson entered Parliament at the 1918 general election when he was selected as Coalition Liberal candidate for his home Division of Stretford. That is to say, he was the candidate of the Coalition government of David Lloyd George and the Conservatives of Bonar Law, and as such he received the Coalition coupon. He won the seat by a large majority in a straight fight against Labour.

Robinson held his seat at the 1922 general election, standing as a Lloyd George National Liberal, again in a straight fight with Labour. He held again against Labour, this time described solely as a Liberal, in 1923, and in another straight fight in 1924 he won Stretford for a fourth time, although this time standing as a Constitutionalist. Although the Constitutionalists were included in the Unionist lists of Parliamentary candidates, Robinson's victory at Stretford in 1924 was recorded as "no change" in The Times newspaper results from the election, rather than as a Constitutionalist or Unionist gain from the Liberals. At the 1929 general election, Robinson described himself as an Independent, saying he was not fighting on party lines. He declined the Liberal whip in the following Parliament but was often still referred to in the press as a Liberal MP. He did not stand for Parliament again.

== Other appointments ==
Robinson was Chairman of the Local Legislation Committee of the House of Commons, 1922–1931, Chairman of the Dye Stuff Licensing Committee from 1923 to 1934, and Chairman of the Parliamentary Committee of Stretford Corporation. He was a member of the Council of the Victoria University of Manchester and served as a member of the Lancashire Rivers Board and the Mersey and Irwell Catchment Board, being its first Chairman. He was a Justice of the Peace for the county of Lancashire. In 1939 he was elected President of Lancashire County Cricket Club.

== Honours ==
Robinson was appointed Officer of the Order of the British Empire (OBE) in the 1919 New Year Honours. He was knighted in the 1920 New Year Honours for public and Parliamentary services and was appointed Knight Commander of the Order of the British Empire (KBE) in 1934.

== Death ==
He died suddenly at his home, The Hawthorns, Edge Lane, Stretford on 30 December 1953 aged 89 years.

== Footnotes ==
Parliament of the United Kingdom
| Preceded by Harry Nuttall | Member of Parliament for Stretford; 1918 – 1931 | Succeeded by Gustav Renwick |
