= Arnold Herbert =

British Liberal Party politician and barrister

T.A.Herbert

Thomas Arnold Herbert (1863 – 22 November 1940) was a British Liberal Party politician and barrister.

== Background ==
He was a son of Professor Thomas Martin Herbert, Professor of Philosophy and Church History at the Lancashire Independent College, whose mother was sister of Ann and Jane Taylor, authors of Twinkle Twinkle Little Star. He was educated at Mill Hill School, Owens College, Manchester, and St John's College, Cambridge. He married in 1896, Elizabeth Goodier Haworth. She died in 1917.

== Law career ==
Herbert was an Exhibitioner, Foundation Scholar and M’Mahon Law Student at the University of Cambridge. He achieved first class honors in both the Classical and Law Tripos and was ranked joint senior in the Law Tripos. In 1890 he was the winner of Yorke Prize of Cambridge University for 'The History of the Law of Prescription in England'. In 1891 he had this work published. Equity Scholarship of the Inner Temple. He received a Call to the bar in 1889 and practised at the Chancery Bar. He was appointed a King's Counsel in 1913. He served as a justice of the peace in Buckinghamshire.

== Political career ==
He served as Liberal MP for Wycombe from 1906 to 1910. Standing for the first time, he gained Wycombe from the Conservative at the 1906 General Election. He served just one parliamentary term before defending his seat at the January 1910 General Election, when the Conservative Sir Charles Alfred Cripps won the seat with a majority of 17%.

He did not stand for parliament again.

=== Electoral record ===
General election 1906: Wycombe
Party	Candidate	Votes	%	±%
Liberal	Thomas Arnold Herbert	6,839	54.9	
Conservative	A H S Cripps	5,626	45.1	
Majority		1,213	9.8	
Turnout		12,465	82.8	
Liberal gain from Conservative		Swing		

General election January 1910: Wycombe
Party	Candidate	Votes	%	±%
Conservative	Sir Charles Alfred Cripps	8,690	58.6	
Liberal	Thomas Arnold Herbert	6,134	41.4	
Majority		2,556	17.2	
Turnout				
Conservative gain from Liberal		Swing		

Parliament of the United Kingdom
Preceded by William Grenfell	Member of Parliament for Wycombe; 1906 – January 1910	Succeeded by Charles Cripps
