= Anthony Crossley =

British politician (1903-1939)

Anthony Crommelin Crossley

Member of Parliament for Oldham
- In office 27 October 1931 – 25 October 1935 Serving with Hamilton Kerr
- Preceded by: James Wilson; Gordon Lang
- Succeeded by: Leslie Hale; Frank Fairhurst

Member of Parliament for Stretford
- In office 14 November 1935 – 15 August 1939
- Preceded by: Gustav Renwick
- Succeeded by: Ralph Etherton

Personal details
- Born: 13 August 1903
- Died: 15 August 1939 (aged 36) Off the coast of Denmark
- Cause of death: Air crash
- Party: Conservative
- Relatives: William Crossley (grandfather)
- Education: Magdalen College, Oxford

Anthony Crommelin Crossley (13 August 1903 – 15 August 1939) was a British writer, publisher and Conservative politician.

== Early life ==
Crossley was born on 13 August 1903, the only son of Sir Kenneth Irwin Crossley, 2nd Baronet. His father was chairman of Crossley Brothers Limited and Crossley Motors Limited. He eventually became a director of the company.

In 1916 Crossley enrolled at Eton College, completing his education at Magdalen College, Oxford. His flair for writing both poetry and prose led to his becoming a partner in the publishing house of Christopher's from 1928 to 1935.

In 1927 he married Clare Thomson, a painter, daughter of Brigadier A F Thomson, and had two daughters and one son.

== Political career ==
In 1931 Crossley was elected one of two Conservative Members of Parliament (MPs) for the two-seat Oldham borough constituency. At the next election in 1935 he was elected as MP for Stretford in south east Lancashire. He remained MP for the area until his death in 1939.

== Sports ==
Crossley was noted as an enthusiast for fishing and had written a book on the subject. As a tennis player, he had competed in The Championships, Wimbledon in 1931. and 1932.

== Death ==
On 15 August 1939, Crossley was one of four passengers on-board Lockheed Model 10 Electra, G-AESY. The aircraft was operated by British Airways Ltd and flying from Heston Aerodrome to Hamburg, where a German passenger boarded it. It then flew to Copenhagen Airport, but never reached its destination.

At around 13.20, the aircraft was around 80 kilometres (50 mi) from its destination. The pilot radioed a report of a fire on board and soon after made an emergency water-landing in the Storstrømmen, not far from the Storstrøm Bridge. The aircraft quickly sank. The pilot was the only one of the six on board who managed to escape and was rescued by a bridge worker.

The next day, the aircraft was raised and it was established that all the victims had likely succumbed to smoke inhalation; two had died because of the fire, three had drowned after the aircraft ditched. The fire was later attributed to leaking fuel caused by the fuel tanks being over-filled; the cause of ignition was not established.

As a Member of Parliament, Crossley's death resulted in the 1939 Stretford by-election, which was won by Conservative Ralph Etherton.

== Publications ==
Crossley published three books of poetry: Aucassin and Nicolette and Other Poems, Prophets, Gods and Witches and Tragedy under Lucifer. His prose works showed his other interests: The History of Eton College Hunt (1922), Chin Wag: The War Records of the Eton Manor Club and The Floating Line for Salmon and Sea Trout (1939, with illustrations by Roy Beddington) .

Parliament of the United Kingdom
Preceded by James Wilson; Gordon Lang	Member of Parliament for Oldham; 1931 – 1935; With: Hamilton William Kerr	Succeeded by Hamilton William Kerr; John Samuel Dodd
Preceded by Gustav Renwick	Member of Parliament for Stretford; 1935 – 1939	Succeeded by Ralph Etherton
