= 1901 Stretford by-election =

UK Parliamentary by-election

← 1900	26 February 1901	1906 →

Candidate	Cripps	Thomasson
Party	Conservative	Liberal
Popular vote	7,088	5,791
Percentage	55.0%	45.0%
MP before election
Sir John Maclure
Conservative
Subsequent MP
Harry Nuttall
Liberal

The 1901 Stretford by-election was held on 26 February 1901 after the death of the incumbent Conservative MP, Sir John Maclure. It was retained by the Conservative candidate Charles Cripps.

By-election 1901: Lancashire South East, Stretford Division
Party	Candidate	Votes	%	±%
Conservative	Charles Cripps	7,088	55.0	−5.4
Liberal	Franklin Thomasson	5,791	45.0	+5.4
Majority		1,297	10.0	−10.8
Turnout		12,879	65.4	−0.5
Conservative hold		Swing	-5.4	
