= Charles Cripps, 1st Baron Parmoor =

British politician (1852–1941)

The Right Honourable The Lord Parmoor KCVO PC KC
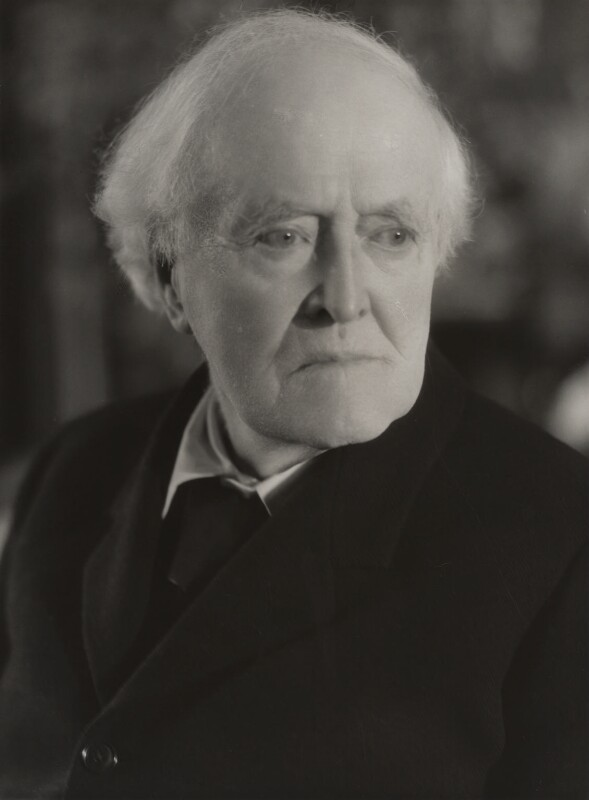
- Parmoor in 1940

Leader of the House of Lords
- In office 7 June 1929 – 24 August 1931
- Monarch: George V
- Prime Minister: Ramsay MacDonald
- Preceded by: The Marquess of Salisbury
- Succeeded by: The Marquess of Reading

Lord President of the Council
- In office 7 June 1929 – 24 August 1931
- Monarch: George V
- Prime Minister: Ramsay MacDonald
- Preceded by: The Earl of Balfour
- Succeeded by: Stanley Baldwin
- In office 22 January 1924 – 3 November 1924
- Monarch: George V
- Prime Minister: Ramsay MacDonald
- Preceded by: The Marquess of Salisbury
- Succeeded by: The Marquess Curzon of Kedleston

Member of the House of Lords Lord Temporal
- In office 16 January 1914 – 30 June 1941; Hereditary Peerage
- Preceded by: Peerage created
- Succeeded by: The 2nd Lord Parmoor

Member of Parliament for Wycombe
- In office 10 February 1910 – 16 January 1914
- Preceded by: Arnold Herbert
- Succeeded by: William Baring du Pré

Member of Parliament for Stretford
- In office 26 February 1901 – 8 February 1906
- Preceded by: Sir John Maclure, 1st Baronet
- Succeeded by: Harry Nuttall

Member of Parliament for Stroud
- In office 7 August 1895 – 24 October 1900
- Preceded by: David Brynmor Jones
- Succeeded by: Charles Allen

Personal details
- Born: 3 October 1852
- Died: 30 June 1941 (aged 88)
- Party: Conservative; Labour
- Spouse(s): (1) Theresa Potter (d. 1893) (2) Marian Ellis (d. 1952)
- Children: 4, including Stafford
- Relatives: Peggy Cripps (granddaughter); Kwame Anthony Appiah (great-grandson)
- Education: New College, Oxford

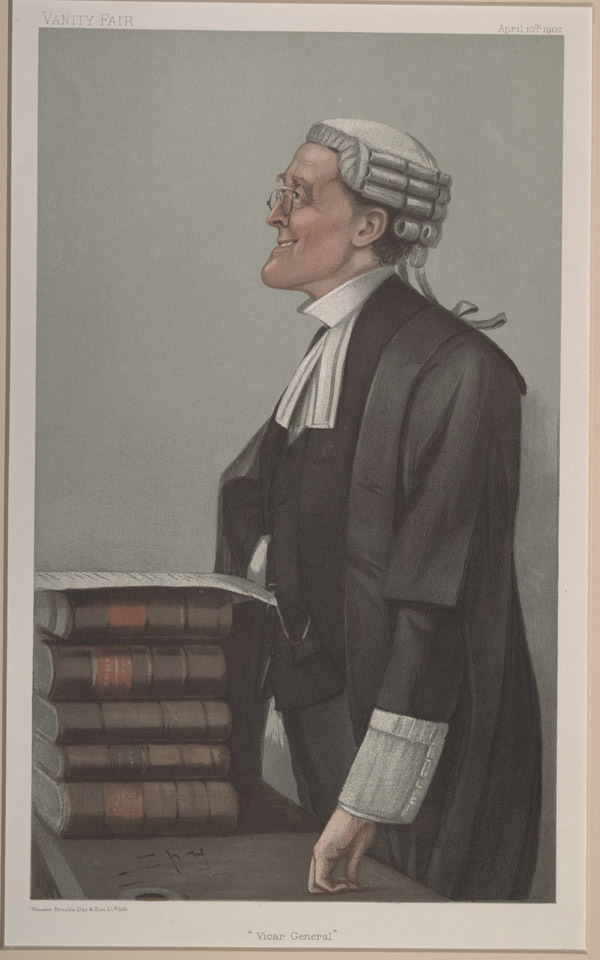
"Vicar General". Caricature by Spy published in Vanity Fair in 1902.

Charles Alfred Cripps, 1st Baron Parmoor, KCVO, PC, KC (3 October 1852 – 30 June 1941) was a British politician who crossed the floor from the Conservative to the Labour Party and was a strong supporter of the League of Nations and of Church of England causes.

== Family and early career ==
Cripps was born in 1852 in West Ilsley, Berkshire, the third son of Henry William Cripps, a wealthy barrister and Queen's Counsel from Berkshire. He attended Winchester College from 1866 and New College, Oxford, from 1871, both on scholarships, and won four first classes at Oxford. At the end of his undergraduate years he was awarded a Fellowship at St John's College, Oxford, which he held for six years.

He was called to the Bar from the Middle Temple in 1877 and went into practice as a barrister. In 1890 he became a Queen's Counsel and in 1893 a Bencher of the Middle Temple. He was appointed as Attorney-General to the Prince of Wales in 1895, an appointment he retained until 1914 under two further Princes, the future George V in 1901 and the future Edward VIII in 1910; his personal service to the royal family was rewarded in 1908 with appointment as a Knight Commander of the Royal Victorian Order (KCVO).

== Parliament ==
Cripps later claimed to have been a supporter of the Liberal Party, but in deference to his die-hard Conservative father, he declined to get involved in politics. However he sided with the Unionists over the issue of home rule for Ireland and was elected as a Unionist to Parliament for Stroud in 1895, where he was a member of the South Africa Commission (investigating the Jameson Raid). He lost his seat in 1900, but soon returned in a by-election as MP for Stretford.

As a devout Anglican of the high church tradition, Cripps was very active in church affairs and was appointed Vicar-General of York in 1900 and of Canterbury in 1902. He again lost his seat in the Liberal landslide victory of 1906, but was elected for Wycombe (the constituency which included the family home) in 1910. He received a peerage from the Liberal government in 1914 and took the title Baron Parmoor, of Frieth in the County of Buckingham, from the family estate.

During the First World War he headed a committee determining compensation for damage caused by German air raids. Although not a judge, he was specially appointed to the Privy Council and to its Judicial Committee, and was among the members of it which ruled on the case of The Zamora (1916), concerning the owner's rights on requisition of a neutral cargo ship, which he later considered, when sitting as a member of the Judicial Committee of the House of Lords on the government's appeal concerning an owner's entitlement to compensation for requisition of a London hotel, in the case of A-G v De Keyser's Royal Hotel Ltd (1920).

== Great War ==
Parmoor considered that his elevation to the peerage in a semi-judicial role had removed any previous political affiliations. The war had a profound effect on Parmoor's political views, as he considered the decision to go to war a disaster. He opposed conscription and sympathised with conscientious objectors, who he thought were subject to excessive punishment.

In the aftermath of war, he became very active in international causes, setting up the 'Fight the Famine Council' which had as its secondary objective the establishment of a League of Nations. The organisation was non-partisan but several trade unions and senior members of the Labour Party took part. When the National Church Assembly was established in 1920 to govern the Church of England, Parmoor was elected to the House of Laity and became its first chairman.

== Labour Party ==
Parmoor approved of the statement on peace in the Labour Party's 1923 election manifesto. After the election, with a Labour government in prospect, he received a letter from Ramsay MacDonald inviting him to join it. Parmoor wrote that he "should rejoice in the formation of a Labour Government under your leadership". He was made Lord President of the Council and joint Leader of the House of Lords with Viscount Haldane, with the difficult job of piloting government legislation through a House in which it had minimal support. Although the government lost practically every vote, Parmoor was able to persuade the opposition that they would lose support by wrecking the whole legislative programme. Macdonald, who was serving as his own Foreign Secretary, also chose Parmoor as British representative to the Council of the League of Nations, and to its Assembly in September 1924.

After the end of the Labour government, Parmoor remained active in the House of Lords, and when Haldane died in 1928, was elected Leader of the Labour Peers. He served again as Lord President of the Council with special responsibility for League of Nations affairs in the second Labour government of 1929–1931, despite his advanced age of 76 at reappointment. He remained with the Labour Party when MacDonald formed the National Government in August 1931, disapproving of MacDonald's actions on constitutional grounds, but stepped down as Leader of the Labour Peers at the dissolution of Parliament on 7 October.

== Family ==
In 1881, Charles Cripps married Theresa Potter, daughter of the Radical MP Richard Potter and sister of Beatrice Webb, Baroness Passfield, and Catherine Courtney, Baroness Courtney of Penwith.

Of the four sons of the marriage, the elder two, Alfred and Frederick, succeeded in turn to the peerage, the third son, Leonard, had a military career, and the youngest, Stafford, became a prominent political figure in the 1930s and 1940s. Charles' only daughter Ruth married the chemist, Sir Alfred Egerton.

Theresa died in 1893. In 1919, Lord Parmoor married Marian Ellis; there were no children of the marriage. Lord Parmoor died in June 1941, aged 88. His second wife died in July 1952.

== Arms ==
Coat of arms of Charles Cripps, 1st Baron Parmoor
Crest An ostrich’s head couped Argent gorged with a coronet of fleurs-de-lis and holding in the beak a horseshoe Or. Escutcheon Chequy Ermines and Argent on a chevron Vert five horseshoes Or. Supporters On either side a seahorse Proper supporting a pennon Ermines charged with a swan rousand Argent beaked and legged Gules ducally gorged and lined Or Motto Fronti Nulla Fides

Parliament of the United Kingdom
Preceded by David Brynmor Jones	Member of Parliament for Stroud; 1895–1900	Succeeded by Charles Allen
Preceded by Sir John Maclure	Member of Parliament for Stretford; 1901–1906	Succeeded by Harry Nuttall
Preceded by Arnold Herbert	Member of Parliament for Wycombe; 1910–1914	Succeeded by William Baring du Pré
Political offices
Preceded by The Marquess of Salisbury	Lord President of the Council; 1924	Succeeded by The Marquess Curzon of Kedleston
Preceded by The Earl of Balfour	Lord President of the Council; 1929–1931	Succeeded by Stanley Baldwin
Preceded by The Marquess of Salisbury	Leader of the House of Lords; 1929–1931	Succeeded by The Marquess of Reading
Party political offices
Preceded by The Viscount Haldane	Leader of the Labour Party in the House of Lords; 1928–1931	Succeeded by The Lord Ponsonby of Shulbrede
Peerage of the United Kingdom
New creation	Baron Parmoor; 1914–1941	Succeeded by Alfred Cripps
