= Kilgore Mill Covered Bridge and Mill Site =

- U.S. National Register of Historic Places
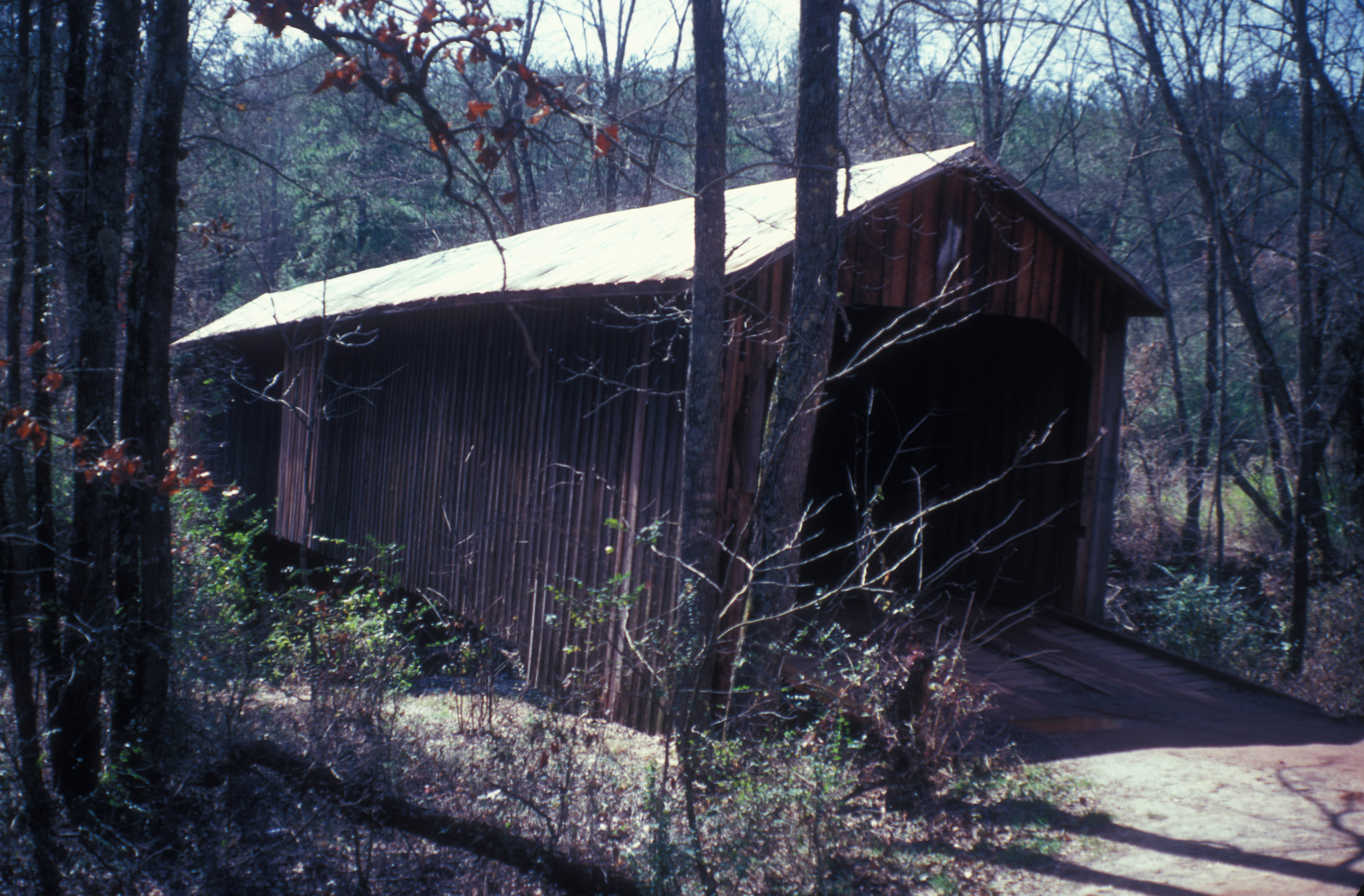

- Location within Georgia
- Nearest city: Bethlehem, Georgia
- Coordinates: 33°54′00″N 83°44′25″W
- Area: less than one acre
- Built: 1894
- Built by: Thompson, D.J.
- Architectural style: Town lattice truss
- NRHP reference No.: 75000572
- Added to NRHP: April 14, 1975

The Kilgore Mill Covered Bridge and Mill Site, near Bethlehem, Georgia, was listed on the National Register of Historic Places in 1975. The bridge, built in 1894, has also been known as the Bethlehem Bridge, the Apalachee River Bridge, and the Briscoe Mill Bridge. This bridge was destroyed by arson on April 23, 1993, and is no longer standing.

It is located 3.5 miles (5.6 km) southwest of Bethlehem, across the Apalachee River (which is the boundary between Barrow County and Walton County).

It is a single-span Town lattice truss bridge, 117 feet (36 m) long.
