= Herschel Austin =

British furniture-maker and politician

Member of Parliament for Stretford
- In office 5 July 1945 – 3 February 1950
- Preceded by: Ralph Etherton
- Succeeded by: Samuel Storey

Personal details
- Born: 22 March 1911 Plymouth, England
- Died: 8 April 1974 (aged 63)
- Party: Labour
- Military career
- Allegiance: United Kingdom
- Branch: Royal Navy
- Service years: 1944–1945
- Conflicts: World War II

Herschel Lewis Austin (22 March 1911 – 8 April 1974) was a British Labour Party politician who served as the Member of Parliament (MP) for Stretford from 1945 to 1950.

== Early life ==
Austin was born in Plymouth, England, the son of Austrian immigrants, who later anglicised their surname from the Austrian "Ornstein". Lew, as he was known, grew up in poverty in the East End of London. His father Mordechai (Max), a bamboo worker, died of pulmonary tuberculosis at the age of 44, when Lewis was aged just 3, in 1914.

After leaving school at the age of 11, he educated himself as much as he could by attending night classes and visiting libraries when he wasn't working as an apprentice cabinet maker. He owed much of his wide-ranging education to Toynbee Hall, a benevolent institution still active in the East End. He later went into business with his three of his brothers, producing affordable furniture with what became Austinsuite furnishings, a precursor to the flatpack furniture later adopted by MFI in the U.K.

== World War II ==
During World War II, the family business, F Austin Leyton Ltd, manufactured military aircraft including the de Havilland Mosquito. Lew Austin was production manager. On one occasion Lord Beaverbrook, the Canadian newspaper entrepreneur who was Minister of Aircraft Production in Churchill's war Ministry, visited the factory and was shown round by "Mr. Lew". After the visit one of the men's toilets had two articles of graffiti on the wall. The first read "Lord Beaverbrook is a c**t" The second read "No I'm not".

In 1944, after having previously been refused permission to leave his civilian employment, Lew Austin joined the Royal Navy Volunteer Reserve where he served first on destroyers in the Mediterranean and then in the Fleet Air Arm, ending up in a staff position at a Naval headquarters at Lee on Solent rising to the rank of Sub Lieutenant (Sub.-Lt). He was also prominent in the Fabian Society along with his older brother, the late Frank Austin O.B.E., and was effectively headhunted for a direction shift into politics, after being told by a colleague, "You are wasted here, you're needed in the Labour Party".

== Parliamentary career ==
He joined the party, and in Labour's landslide victory at the 1945 general election he was elected as Member of Parliament (MP) for the Stretford constituency in Manchester, defeating the sitting Conservative MP, Ralph Etherton. He held his seat until the 1950 election, when he was beaten by the Conservative candidate Samuel Storey.

Born to an immigrant family originating from a rabbinic dynasty in the former Austro-Hungarian Empire, now Ukraine, he was an ardent humanist. When campaigning for Parliament late in 1945 he was asked by a heckler at a political rally "what is the candidate's religion?". He replied "I have no religion; I am a free thinker. But I am a Jew and a carpenter and the son of a carpenter but unlike another son of a carpenter two thousand years ago I don't expect to be crucified for my beliefs."

During his time in Parliament Lewis Austin was one of a dozen or so Jewish Members during the period when the British Mandate of Palestine ended and the state of Israel was born. He and his Jewish colleagues fought many battles in the party room over British policy on the Palestine issue. Austin, who regarded the Foreign Secretary Ernest Bevin as an anti-semite, once challenged Bevin to 'come outside' the party room. Austin had been a keen amateur boxer as a young man. He later told family members that Bevin had suggested "we can leave it to the Arabs to kick the bloody Jews into the sea".

At that time Austin published a circular entitled "the importance of being Ernest (Bevin)" which attacked Bevin and his policies roundly, and as result faced discipline from Transport House, headquarters of the Labour Party.

Austin gained something of a reputation as a leftwing firebrand while in Parliament, and some years later was detained on Ellis Island by US immigration for a number of days on suspicion of being a communist, at the height of the McCarthyist movement in the USA.

== Later life ==
After his brief stint in politics, he moved with his wife and young family to Jamaica for a number of years, living in Montego Bay. It was there he took time out to reflect on his next career move. He later returned to the U.K., bring his family to the Hove area, near Brighton in Sussex. He then worked for a four to six-month stint as a door-to-door salesman of the Encyclopædia Britannica. He was discouraged from carrying this on by his wife, the late Irene Austin, later Dame Irene Murray, of the Knights of Saint John, Malta. He then set up his own business in dealing with stocks and shares, acting as a licensed dealer until his untimely death at 63 in April 1974, not long after the Black Monday stock market crash of Spring 1974.

Parliament of the United Kingdom
| Preceded by Ralph Etherton | Member of Parliament for Stretford; 1945–1950 | Succeeded by Samuel Storey |
