= Hoschton, Georgia =

- City
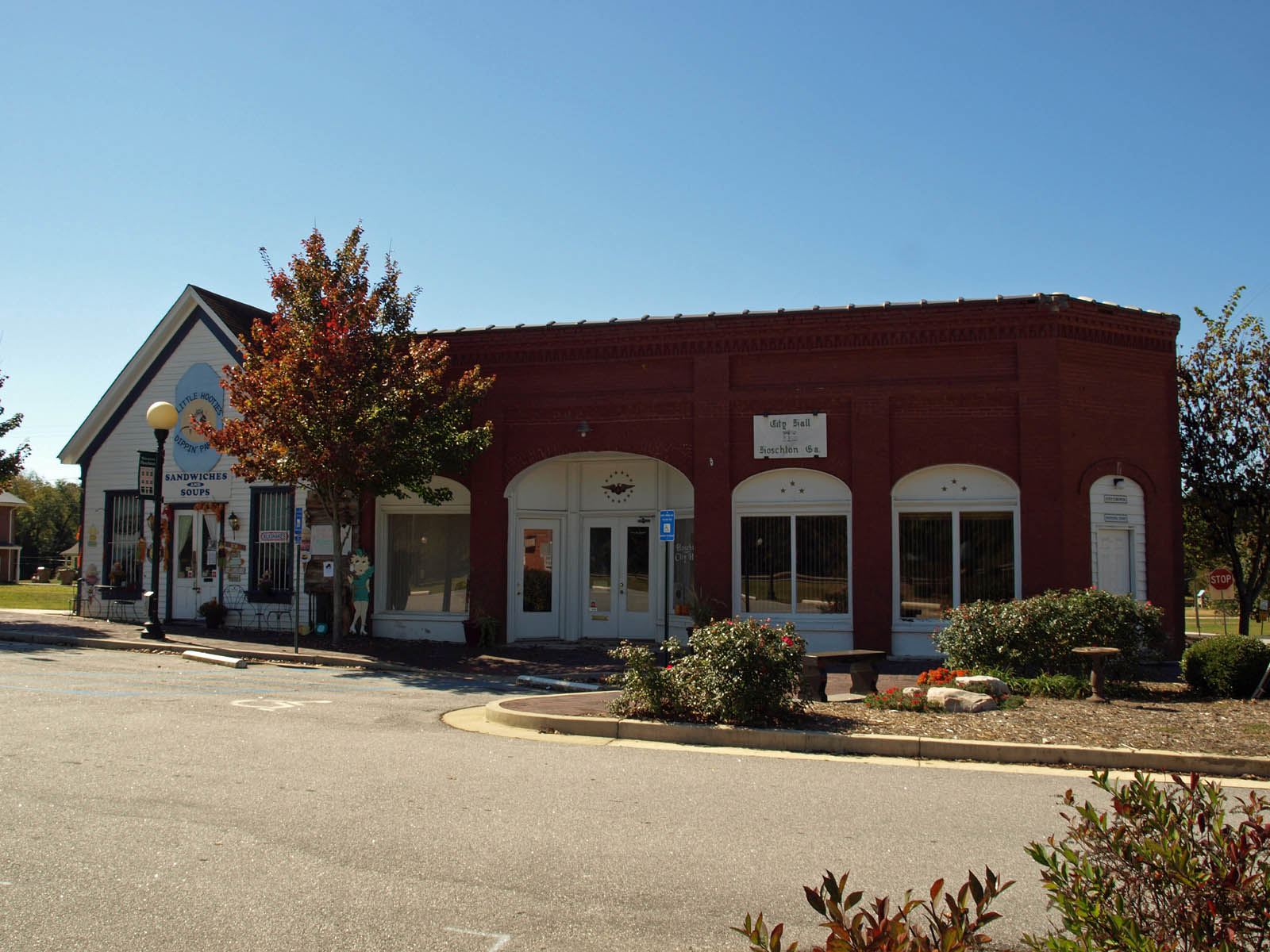
- Hoschton City Hall
- Motto(s): "Planning our future, honoring our past."
- Location in Jackson County and the state of Georgia
- Coordinates: 34°5′46″N 83°45′40″W
- Country: United States
- State: Georgia
- County: Jackson

Area
  - Total: 4.88 sq mi (12.64 km^{2})
  - Land: 4.83 sq mi (12.51 km^{2})
  - Water: 0.046 sq mi (0.12 km^{2})
- Elevation: 902 ft (275 m)

Population (2020)
  - Total: 2,666
  - Density: 551.9/sq mi (213.08/km^{2})
- Time zone: UTC-5 (Eastern (EST))
  - Summer (DST): UTC-4 (EDT)
- ZIP code: 30548
- Area code: 706
- FIPS code: 13-40056
- GNIS feature ID: 0356322
- Website: www.cityofhoschton.net

Hoschton /ˈhʊʃtən/ is a city in Jackson County, Georgia, United States. As of the 2020 census, Hoschton had a population of 2,666.

== History ==
The Georgia General Assembly incorporated the city in 1891 as the Town of Hoschton. The community was named after Russell A. Hosch, a local merchant.

== Geography ==
Hoschton is located in western Jackson County at 34°05′46″N 83°45′40″W. It is bordered to the north by the city of Braselton. Georgia State Route 53 runs through the center of town, leading northwest 12 miles (19 km) to Oakwood and south 9 miles (14 km) to Winder. Jefferson, the county seat, is 12 miles (19 km) to the east, and Atlanta is 50 miles (80 km) to the southwest.

According to the United States Census Bureau, Hoschton has a total area of 2.6 square miles (6.7 km^{2}), of which 0.02 square miles (0.05 km^{2}), or 0.79%, are water. Water bodies in Hoschton drain west and east into tributaries of the Mulberry River, part of the Oconee River watershed.

The ZIP Code for Hoschton, 30548, goes well beyond the city limits and covers part of four counties: Jackson, Gwinnett, Hall, and Barrow. Hoschton's ZIP Code is used within about 40 percent of the Braselton town limits.

== Demographics ==
Historical population
Census	Pop.	Note	%±
1890	207		—
1900	290		40.1%
1910	429		47.9%
1920	377		−12.1%
1930	427		13.3%
1940	364		−14.8%
1950	378		3.8%
1960	370		−2.1%
1970	509		37.6%
1980	490		−3.7%
1990	642		31.0%
2000	1,070		66.7%
2010	1,377		28.7%
2020	2,666		93.6%
2025 (est.)	8,623	▲	223.4%
U.S. Decennial Census; 2025

=== 2020 census ===
As of the 2020 census, Hoschton had a population of 2,666. The median age was 34.5 years. 25.2% of residents were under the age of 18 and 13.1% of residents were 65 years of age or older. For every 100 females there were 93.6 males, and for every 100 females age 18 and over there were 90.4 males age 18 and over.

99.5% of residents lived in urban areas, while 0.5% lived in rural areas.

There were 977 households in Hoschton, of which 39.0% had children under the age of 18 living in them. Of all households, 61.6% were married-couple households, 12.3% were households with a male householder and no spouse or partner present, and 20.1% were households with a female householder and no spouse or partner present. About 16.9% of all households were made up of individuals and 6.9% had someone living alone who was 65 years of age or older.

There were 1,038 housing units, of which 5.9% were vacant. The homeowner vacancy rate was 2.8% and the rental vacancy rate was 5.0%.

Racial composition as of the 2020 census
Race	Number	Percent
White	2,085	78.2%
Black or African American	183	6.9%
American Indian and Alaska Native	10	0.4%
Asian	63	2.4%
Native Hawaiian and Other Pacific Islander	2	0.1%
Some other race	106	4.0%
Two or more races	217	8.1%
Hispanic or Latino (of any race)	288	10.8%

=== 2000 census ===
As of the 2000 census, there were 1,070 people, 388 households, and 304 families residing in the city. The population density was 437.2 inhabitants per square mile (168.8/km^{2}). There were 404 housing units at an average density of 165.1 per square mile (63.7/km^{2}). The racial makeup of the city was 93.36% White, 4.86% African American, 0.19% Native American, 0.09% Asian, 0.28% from other races, and 1.21% from two or more races. Hispanic or Latino of any race were 1.40% of the population.

There were 388 households, out of which 37.4% had children under the age of 18 living with them, 64.2% were married couples living together, 10.8% had a female householder with no husband present, and 21.4% were non-families. 17.8% of all households were made up of individuals, and 5.7% had someone living alone who was 65 years of age or older. The average household size was 2.76 and the average family size was 3.12.

In the city, the population was spread out, with 28.3% under the age of 18, 8.0% from 18 to 24, 30.5% from 25 to 44, 22.6% from 45 to 64, and 10.6% who were 65 years of age or older. The median age was 34 years. For every 100 females, there were 95.3 males. For every 100 females age 18 and over, there were 95.2 males.

The median income for a household in the city was $50,625, and the median income for a family was $57,917. Males had a median income of $40,000 versus $27,153 for females. The per capita income for the city was $22,416. About 9.5% of families and 11.5% of the population were below the poverty line, including 12.5% of those under age 18 and 18.8% of those age 65 or over.

== Notable people ==
- Joseph A. Boyd Jr. (1916–2007), politician and jurist in Florida
- Elijah Bryant (born 1995), basketball player in the Israeli Basketball Premier League; formerly in the NBA
- Darrel Chaney (born 1948), former Major League Baseball shortstop
- Blaine Earon (1929–2019), NFL football defensive lineman
