= Apalachee River (Georgia) =

Coordinates: 33°32′39″N 83°16′42″W

Location
- Country: United States

Physical characteristics
- Source
  - location: Georgia

The Apalachee River is a 74-mile-long (119 km) tributary of the Oconee River in the U.S. state of Georgia. It rises north of Lawrenceville in eastern Gwinnett County and flows southeast to join the Oconee River in Lake Oconee west of Greensboro.

It is spanned by the Kilgore Mill Covered Bridge.

Early in the period of European settlement of the region, the Apalachee was known as the Tulapocca, and subsequently, the South Oconee River. Around 1790, the river became known as the Apalachee, for unknown reasons, as the Apalachee were a native nation whose home was hundreds of miles (kilometers) away on the Florida Gulf Coast.

== See also ==
- List of rivers of Georgia
