= Sir John Maclure, 1st Baronet =

British politician

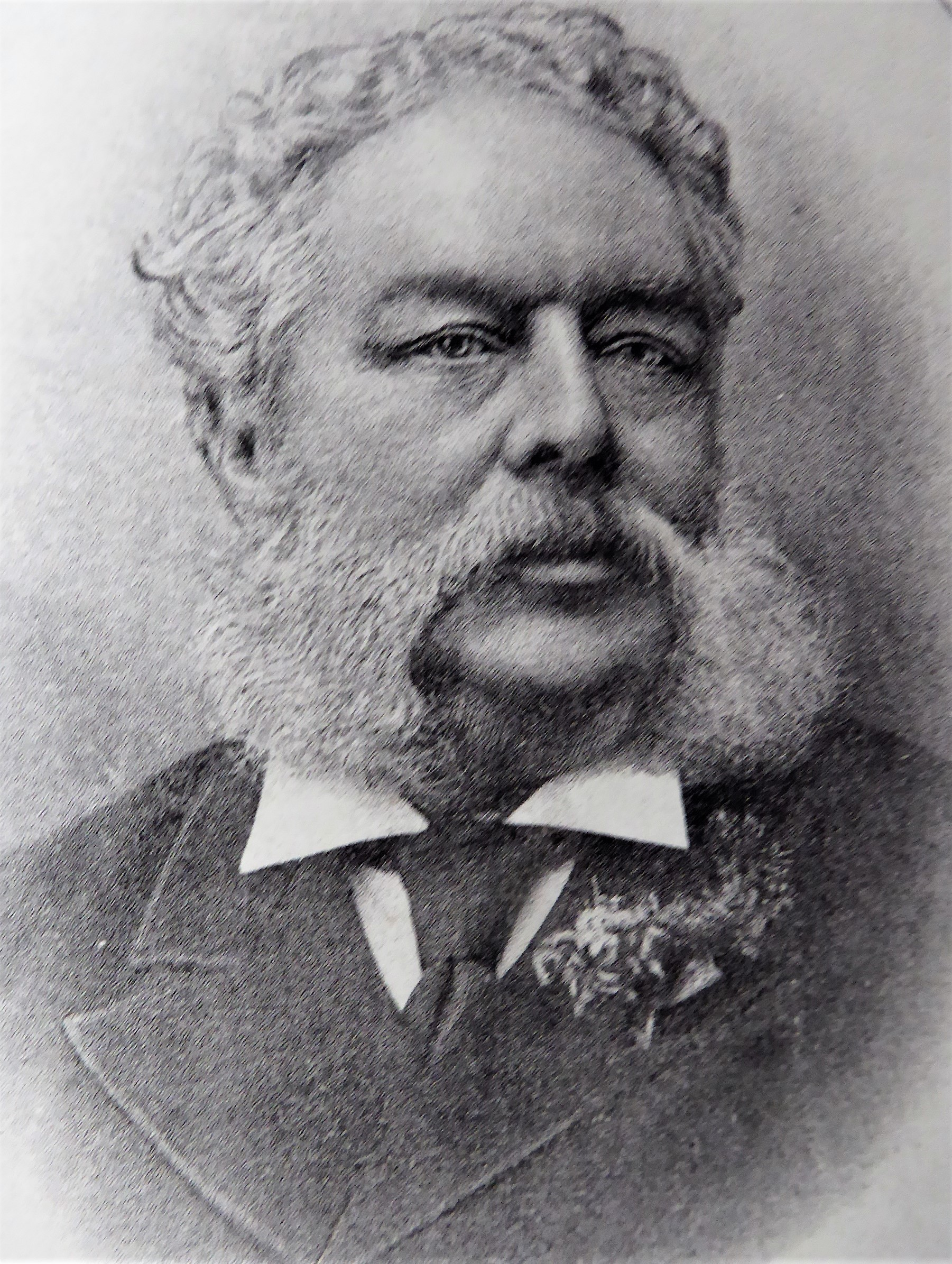
John William Maclure, 1891

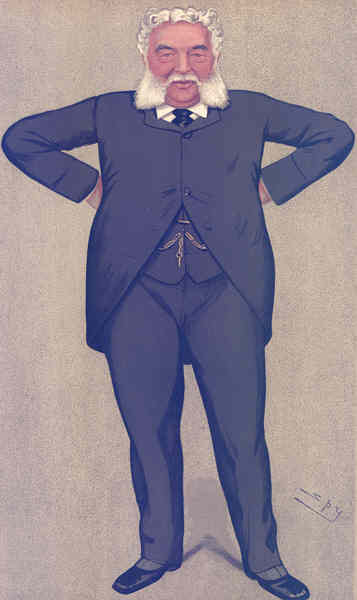
"The Whitehead Torpedo" Maclure as caricatured by Spy (Leslie Ward) in Vanity Fair, October 1892

Sir John William Maclure, 1st Baronet (22 April 1835 – 28 January 1901), was a British businessman and Conservative politician.

== Biography ==
Maclure was educated at Manchester Grammar School and Brasenose College, Oxford, but left university without taking a degree due to ill health. He later became manager of the Guardian Insurance Company and was also Secretary of the Cotton Famine Relief Fund during the Lancashire Cotton famine in the early 1860s. He played an important role for the revival of Conservatism in Manchester and served as President of the Conservative Association of South and East Lancashire. In the 1885 general election he unsuccessfully contested Stretford, but was successfully returned for the same constituency in the 1886 general election, and held the seat until his death. In 1898 he was created a Baronet, of The Home in Whalley Range near Manchester in the County Palatine of Lancaster. In January 1900 he was elected as Chairman of the Lancashire Conservative Members of Parliament. He died in January 1901, aged 65. In his memory, his family paid for a stained-glass window placed in the clerestory of the nave of Manchester Cathedral in June 1902.

His brother, Edward Craig Maclure was Dean of Manchester from 1890 to 1906.

His youngest heir to the title is John James Maclure born 1997. He attended Bristol University.

== Notes ==
Parliament of the United Kingdom
Preceded by William Agnew	Member of Parliament for Stretford; 1886–1901	Succeeded by Charles Cripps
Baronetage of the United Kingdom
New creation	Baronet (of The Home); 1898–1901	Succeeded by John Edward Stanley Maclure
