= WJBB (AM) =

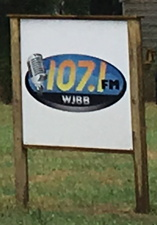

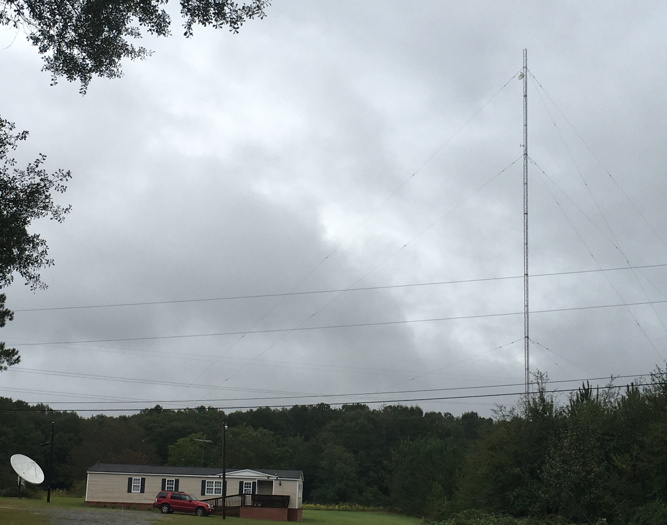
- WJBB's studios and tower on Arch Tanner Road in Bethlehem, Georgia
- Winder, Georgia; United States
- Frequency: 1300 kHz

Programming
- Format: Full-service

Ownership
- Owner: David & Chris Hawkins; (WarHawk Media LLC)

History
- First air date: 1952
- Former call signs: WIMO (1952–2014)

Technical information
- Licensing authority: FCC
- Facility ID: 63385
- Class: D
- Power: 650 watts (day); 50 watts (night)
- Transmitter coordinates: 33°55′40.00″N 83°43′37.00″W
- Translator: 107.1 W296CX (Winder)

Links
- Public license information: Public file; LMS
- Webcast: Listen live
- Website: wjbbradio.com

WJBB (1300 AM) with FM translator W296CX at 107.1 MHz is a radio station broadcasting a mix of yacht rock, soft rock, southern rock, pop, and soul music from the mid 60s to the mid 90s with the tagline "Heart, Soul, and Rock n Roll". In the evening, the station offers a mix of classic rock and on the weekends Casey Kasem's American Top 40 from the 1970s. The station is primarily branded by its FM translator frequency as "WJBB, 107.1". Licensed to Winder, Georgia the station is owned by WarHawk Media LLC after the company purchased both licenses in June 2026.

== Sports ==
WJBB broadcasts Atlanta Braves baseball and Northeast Georgia prep sports.

== Translator ==
WJBB is relayed full-time over the following low-power translator:

Broadcast translator for WJBB
Call sign	Frequency	City of license	FID	ERP (W)	HAAT	Class	Transmitter coordinates	FCC info
W296CX	107.1 FM	Winder, Georgia	146792	250	391 m (1,283 ft)	D	34°7′32″N 83°51′32″W	LMS
