= Stretford (constituency) =

Parliamentary constituency in the United Kingdom, 1885–1997

- Former borough constituency for the House of Commons
- Stretford in Greater Manchester, showing boundaries used from 1983–1997
- County: Greater Manchester

1950–1997
- Seats: One
- Replaced by: Stretford and Urmston, Manchester Central

1885–1950
- Seats: One
- Type of constituency: County constituency
- Created from: South West Lancashire

Stretford was a parliamentary constituency in North West England, which returned one Member of Parliament (MP) to the House of Commons of the Parliament of the United Kingdom.

The constituency was created for the 1885 general election, and abolished for the 1997 general election. The constituency was centred on the town of Stretford and originally included an area to the south west of the city of Manchester. The boundaries changed considerably over its existence, at times extending east to include parts of the city itself and at other times including the towns of Irlam and Urmston to the west.

== Boundaries ==
Stretford in Lancashire, boundaries used 1974–1983

=== 1885–1918 ===
The Stretford Division of the County of Lancashire was formed by the Redistribution of Seats Act 1885. The constituency consisted of a number of civil parishes and townships to the south and south-east of the city of Manchester and north-east of the borough of Stockport:

- Burnage
- Chorlton-cum-Hardy
- Didsbury
- The portion of Heaton Norris outside the Borough of Stockport
- Levenshulme
- Reddish
- Rusholme
- Stretford
- Withington

An extension of the boundaries of Manchester meant that Rusholme became part of the city later in 1885. A further enlargement saw Burnage, Chorlton-cum-Hardy, Didsbury and Withington included in Manchester in 1904. Similarly, the County Borough of Stockport was enlarged to include Reddish in 1901 and Heaton Norris in 1913. These local government boundary changes did not affect the constituency until the next parliamentary redistribution in 1918.

=== 1918–1950 ===
The Representation of the People Act 1918 reorganised constituencies throughout the United Kingdom. A new Stretford Division of Lancashire was formed. The areas in Manchester and Stockport passed to the Manchester Rusholme, Manchester Withington and Stockport constituencies. The new Stretford constituency included areas further to the west and was defined as consisting of the following local government units of the administrative county of Lancashire:

- The urban districts of Irlam, Stretford and Urmston
- The civil parish of Astley in Leigh Rural District
- The civil parish of Clifton in Barton upon Irwell Rural District

=== 1950–1983 ===
For the 1950 general election, a new Stretford borough constituency was created. The constituency comprised the Municipal Borough of Stretford (successor to the urban district) and the urban district of Urmston. The Astley area passed to the Leigh borough constituency and Clifton to the Farnworth county constituency.

=== 1983–1997 ===
Constituencies were redrawn for the 1983 general election to reflect the changes in local government in 1974. A new Stretford borough constituency, part of the Greater Manchester parliamentary county, was formed. The new constituency consisted of two wards of the City of Manchester, and five wards from the Metropolitan Borough of Trafford. The Manchester wards were Moss Side and Whalley Range, and the Trafford wards were Clifford, Longford, Park, Stretford and Talbot. Urmston became part of the new constituency of Davyhulme.

=== Abolition ===
The Parliamentary Constituencies (England) Order 1995, which came into effect for the 1997 general election, abolished the Stretford constituency. The area was redistributed, with Moss Side and Whalley Range added to an enlarged Manchester Central seat. The remainder became part of the new Stretford and Urmston constituency. The last MP for Stretford, Tony Lloyd, was subsequently elected as the Member of Parliament for Manchester Central.

== Members of Parliament ==
Election	Member	Party
1885	William Agnew	Liberal
1886	Sir John Maclure	Unionist
1901 by-election	Charles Cripps	Unionist
1906	Harry Nuttall	Liberal
1918	Thomas Robinson	Coalition Liberal
1922	Thomas Robinson	National Liberal
1923	Thomas Robinson	Liberal
1924	Thomas Robinson	Constitutionalist
1924	Thomas Robinson	Liberal
1929	Thomas Robinson	Independent
1931	Gustav Renwick	Conservative
1935	Anthony Crossley	Conservative
1939 by-election	Ralph Etherton	Conservative
1945	Herschel Austin	Labour
1950	Sir Samuel Storey	Conservative
1966	Ernest Davies	Labour
1970	Winston Churchill	Conservative
1983	Tony Lloyd	Labour
1997	constituency abolished	

== Elections ==
=== Elections in the 1880s ===
General election 1885: Lancashire South East, Stretford Division
Party	Candidate	Votes	%	±%
Liberal	William Agnew	4,866	51.0	
Conservative	John MacClure	4,676	49.0	
Majority		190	2.0	
Turnout		9,542	85.7	
Registered electors		11,140		
Liberal win (new seat)				

General election 1886: Lancashire South East, Stretford Division
Party	Candidate	Votes	%	±%
Conservative	John MacClure	4,750	54.2	+5.2
Liberal	William Agnew	4,011	45.8	−5.2
Majority		739	8.4	N/A
Turnout		8,761	78.6	−7.1
Registered electors		11,140		
Conservative gain from Liberal		Swing	+5.2	

=== Elections in the 1890s ===
General election 1892: Lancashire South East, Stretford Division
Party	Candidate	Votes	%	±%
Conservative	John MacClure	6,623	55.7	+1.5
Liberal	William Agnew	5,278	44.3	−1.5
Majority		1,345	11.4	+3.0
Turnout		11,901	77.2	−1.4
Registered electors		15,425		
Conservative hold		Swing	+1.5	

General election 1895: Lancashire South East, Stretford Division
Party	Candidate	Votes	%	±%
Conservative	John MacClure	Unopposed		
Conservative hold				

=== Elections in the 1900s ===
General election 1900: Stretford
Party	Candidate	Votes	%	±%
Conservative	John MacClure	7,519	60.4	N/A
Liberal	Harry Nuttall	4,938	39.6	New
Majority		2,581	20.8	N/A
Turnout		12,457	65.9	N/A
Registered electors		18,909		
Conservative hold		Swing	N/A	

Maclure died 28 January 1901.

Thomasson

1901 Stretford by-election: Stretford
Party	Candidate	Votes	%	±%
Conservative	Charles Cripps	7,088	55.0	−5.4
Liberal	Franklin Thomasson	5,791	45.0	+5.4
Majority		1,297	10.0	−10.8
Turnout		12,879	65.4	−0.5
Registered electors		19,706		
Conservative hold		Swing	−5.4	

Nuttall

General election 1906: Stretford
Party	Candidate	Votes	%	±%
Liberal	Harry Nuttall	11,131	57.3	+17.7
Conservative	Charles Cripps	8,307	42.7	−17.7
Majority		2,824	14.6	N/A
Turnout		19,438	79.9	+14.0
Registered electors		24,326		
Liberal gain from Conservative		Swing	+12.3	

=== Elections in the 1910s ===
General election, January 1910: Lancashire South East, Stretford Division
Party	Candidate	Votes	%	±%
Liberal	Harry Nuttall	12,917	54.9	−2.4
Conservative	Arthur Samuel	10,626	45.1	+2.4
Majority		2,921	9.8	−4.8
Turnout		23,543	85.2	+5.3
Registered electors		27,629		
Liberal hold		Swing	−2.4	

General election, December 1910: Lancashire South East, Stretford Division
Party	Candidate	Votes	%	±%
Liberal	Harry Nuttall	11,343	52.0	−2.9
Conservative	Arthur Samuel	10,467	48.0	+2.9
Majority		876	4.0	−5.8
Turnout		21,810	78.9	−6.3
Registered electors		27,629		
Liberal hold		Swing	−2.9	

General election, 1918: Lancashire, Stretford Division
Party		Candidate	Votes	%	±%
C	Liberal	Thomas Robinson*	17,161	76.7	+24.7
	Labour	Joseph Hallsworth	5,216	23.3	New
Majority			11,945	53.4	+49.4
Turnout			22,377	61.4	−17.5
Registered electors			36,459		
	Liberal hold		Swing		
C indicates candidate endorsed by the coalition government.

* Robinson stood as an 'Independent Free Trade and Anti-Socialist' candidate, but he was claimed as a Liberal candidate and has thus been denoted as such.

=== Elections in the 1920s ===
General election, 1922: Lancashire, Stretford Division
Party	Candidate	Votes	%	±%
National Liberal	Thomas Robinson	19,185	68.7	−8.0
Labour	Alfred Hartley Turner	8,733	31.3	+8.0
Majority		10,452	37.4	−16.0
Turnout		27,918		
National Liberal hold		Swing		

General election, 1923: Stretford
Party	Candidate	Votes	%	±%
Liberal	Thomas Robinson	15,971	58.2	−10.5
Labour	John Corlett	11,451	41.8	+10.5
Majority		4,520	16.4	−21.0
Turnout		27,422		
Liberal hold		Swing	-10.5	

General election, 1924: Lancashire, Stretford Division
Party	Candidate	Votes	%	±%
Constitutionalist	Thomas Robinson	20,826	64.4	+6.2
Labour	Joseph Robinson	11,520	35.6	−6.2
Majority		9,306	28.8	+12.4
Turnout		32,346		
Constitutionalist hold		Swing		

General election, 1929: Stretford
Party	Candidate	Votes	%	±%
Independent	Thomas Robinson	25,799	58.6	−5.8
Labour	Frank Anderson	18,199	41.4	+5.8
Majority		7,600	16.8	−12.0
Turnout		43,998		
Independent hold		Swing	-5.8	

=== Elections in the 1930s ===
General election, 1931: Lancashire, Stretford Division
Party	Candidate	Votes	%	±%
Conservative	Gustav Renwick	39,002	75.3	New
Labour	Frank Anderson	12,796	24.7	−16.7
Majority		26,206	50.6	N/A
Turnout		51,798		
Conservative gain from Independent		Swing		

General election 1935: Lancashire, Stretford Division
Party	Candidate	Votes	%	±%
Conservative	Anthony Crossley	34,874	64.4	−10.9
Labour	Tom Myers	19,278	35.6	+10.9
Majority		15,596	28.8	−21.8
Turnout		54,152		
Conservative hold		Swing		

Crossley died in an aeroplane crash off the coast of Denmark on 15 August 1939.

By-election 1939: Lancashire, Stretford Division
Party	Candidate	Votes	%	±%
Conservative	Ralph Etherton	23,408	79.8	+15.4
Ind. Labour Party	Bob Edwards	4,424	15.1	N/A
Communist	Eric Gower	1,514	5.1	New
Majority		18,984	64.7	+35.9
Turnout		29,346		
Conservative hold		Swing		

=== Elections in the 1940s ===
General election 1945: Lancashire, Stretford Division
Party	Candidate	Votes	%	±%
Labour	Herschel Austin	35,715	54.8	+19.2
Conservative	Ralph Etherton	29,421	45.2	−19.2
Majority		6,294	9.6	N/A
Turnout		65,136	78.5	
Labour gain from Conservative		Swing		

=== Elections in the 1950s ===
General election 1950: Stretford Borough Constituency
Party	Candidate	Votes	%	±%
Conservative	Samuel Storey	30,678	48.6	+3.4
Labour	Herschel Austin	25,075	39.7	−15.1
Liberal	Stephen Cawley	7,464	11.7	New
Majority		5,603	8.9	N/A
Turnout		63,217	86.9	+8.4
Conservative gain from Labour		Swing		

General election 1951: Stretford Borough Constituency
Party	Candidate	Votes	%	±%
Conservative	Samuel Storey	35,419	58.0	+9.4
Labour	Charles Mapp	25,694	42.0	+2.3
Majority		9,725	16.0	+7.1
Turnout		61,113	83.4	−3.5
Conservative hold		Swing		

General election 1955: Stretford Borough Constituency
Party	Candidate	Votes	%	±%
Conservative	Samuel Storey	33,101	60.9	+2.9
Labour	Fred Barton	21,267	39.1	−2.9
Majority		11,834	21.8	+5.8
Turnout		54,368	76.1	−7.3
Conservative hold		Swing		

General election 1959: Stretford Borough Constituency
Party	Candidate	Votes	%	±%
Conservative	Samuel Storey	32,888	58.3	−2.6
Labour	Edward Reid	23,538	41.7	+2.6
Majority		9,350	16.6	−5.2
Turnout		56,426	79.1	+3.0
Conservative hold		Swing		

=== Elections in the 1960s ===
General election 1964: Stretford Borough Constituency
Party	Candidate	Votes	%	±%
Conservative	Samuel Storey	22,004	40.0	−18.3
Labour	Edward Cavanagh	20,080	36.5	−5.2
Liberal	Michael Winstanley	12,884	23.4	New
Majority		1,924	3.5	−11.1
Turnout		54,968	79.2	+0.1
Conservative hold		Swing		

General election 1966: Stretford Borough Constituency
Party	Candidate	Votes	%	±%
Labour	Ernest Davies	24,739	47.1	+10.6
Conservative	Samuel Storey	21,374	40.7	+0.7
Liberal	Clifford L. Jones	6,382	12.2	−11.2
Majority		3,365	6.4	N/A
Turnout		52,495	77.1	−2.1
Labour gain from Conservative		Swing		

=== Elections in the 1970s ===
General election 1970: Stretford Borough Constituency
Party	Candidate	Votes	%	±%
Conservative	Winston Churchill	28,629	53.8	+13.1
Labour	Ernest Davies	24,614	46.2	−0.9
Majority		4,015	7.6	N/A
Turnout		53,243	74.9	−2.2
Conservative gain from Labour		Swing		

General election February 1974: Stretford Borough Constituency
Party	Candidate	Votes	%	±%
Conservative	Winston Churchill	23,630	42.3	−11.5
Labour	Kenneth Anthony	19,641	35.2	−11.0
Liberal	Dennis Wrigley	12,558	22.5	New
Majority		3,989	7.1	−0.5
Turnout		55,829	82.0	+7.1
Conservative hold		Swing		

General election October 1974: Stretford Borough Constituency
Party	Candidate	Votes	%	±%
Conservative	Winston Churchill	22,114	42.0	−0.3
Labour	Peter N. Scott	20,877	39.7	+4.5
Liberal	Dennis Wrigley	9,629	18.3	−4.2
Majority		1,237	2.3	−4.8
Turnout		52,620	76.5	−5.5
Conservative hold		Swing		

General election 1979: Stretford Borough Constituency
Party	Candidate	Votes	%	±%
Conservative	Winston Churchill	25,972	48.3	+6.3
Labour	Peter N. Scott	21,466	39.9	+0.2
Liberal	Dennis Wrigley	6,369	11.8	−6.5
Majority		4,506	8.4	+6.1
Turnout		53,807	77.7	+1.2
Conservative hold		Swing		

=== Elections in the 1980s ===
General election 1983: Stretford Borough Constituency
Party	Candidate	Votes	%	±%
Labour	Tony Lloyd	18,028	44.8	
Conservative	Walter Sweeney	13,686	34.1	
SDP	David Wilks	8,141	20.3	
Independent Labour	Syad Ud-Din	336	0.8	New
Majority		4,342	10.7	
Turnout		40,191	70.0	+2.3
Labour win (new seat)				

Boundary changes meant that the seat would notionally have been won by Labour in 1979 with a majority of 3,607. The sitting MP, Winston Churchill, moved to the newly created Davyhulme constituency which included part of the pre-1983 Stretford seat

General election 1987: Stretford Borough Constituency
Party	Candidate	Votes	%	±%
Labour	Tony Lloyd	22,831	55.2	+10.4
Conservative	Daniel Dougherty	13,429	32.4	−1.7
SDP	Dennis Lee	5,125	12.4	−7.9
Majority		9,402	22.8	+12.1
Turnout		41,385	71.9	+1.9
Labour hold		Swing		

=== Elections in the 1990s ===
General election 1992: Stretford Borough Constituency
Party	Candidate	Votes	%	±%
Labour	Tony Lloyd	22,300	59.6	+4.4
Conservative	John C.B. Rae	11,163	29.8	−2.6
Liberal Democrats	Francis C. Beswick	3,722	9.9	−2.5
Natural Law	Andrew Boyton	268	0.7	New
Majority		11,137	29.8	+7.0
Turnout		37,453	68.8	−3.1
Labour hold		Swing	+3.6	
