= Holder baronets =

Baronetcy in the Baronetage of the United Kingdom

Escutcheon of the Holder baronets of Pitmaston

The Holder baronetcy, of Pitmaston, in the Parish of Moseley, in the County of Worcester, is a title in the Baronetage of the United Kingdom. It was created on 10 March 1898 for John Holder, a brewer from Birmingham.

== Holder baronets, of Pitmaston (1898) ==
- Sir John Charles Holder, 1st Baronet (1838–1923), married Geraldine Knipe. The stained glass window in the Great Hall of Birmingham University was donated by Sir John Holder. It has 53 lights, contains six shields of the Midlands, the University shield, the arms of the city of Birmingham, the Calthorpe arms, Sir John Holder's arms and the Chamberlain crest.
- Sir Henry Charles Holder, 2nd Baronet (1874–1945)
- Sir John Eric Duncan Holder, 3rd Baronet (1899–1986)
- Sir (John) Henry Holder, 4th Baronet (1928–2020)
- Sir Nigel John Charles Holder, 5th Baronet (born 1962))

The heir presumptive to the baronetcy is Hugo Richard Holder (born 1962), twin brother of the 5th Baronet.

== Notes ==
Baronetage of the United Kingdom
Preceded by Durning-Lawrence baronets	Holder baronets of Pitmaston; 10 March 1898	Succeeded by Maclure baronets
