= Harry Nuttall (politician) =

British politician

- Born: 1849; Manchester
- Died: 25 September 1924 (aged 74–75)
- Education: Owens College
- Occupation: Politician

Harry Nuttall (1849 - 25 September 1924) was a British Liberal politician and member of parliament for Stretford from 1906 to 1918.

Nuttall was born in 1849 in Manchester and attended Owens College. He was an import and export merchant and president of the Manchester Chamber of Commerce in 1905.

== Politics ==
Nuttall unsuccessfully contested the Stretford constituency at the 1900 general election. At the following general election in 1906, he again stood as the Liberal candidate at Stretford constituency, this time unseating the Conservative MP, Charles Cripps. This followed intensive canvassing of the 5,000 Manchester freeholders eligible to vote in the division. He was in favour of women's suffrage. He held his seat at the next two general elections until he retired in 1918.

Nuttall died suddenly on 25 September 1924.

Parliament of the United Kingdom
Preceded by Charles Cripps	Member of Parliament for Stretford; 1906–1918	Succeeded by Thomas Robinson
