= 1939 Stretford by-election =

UK Parliamentary by-election

The 1939 Stretford by-election was held on 8 December 1939. The by-election was held due to the death of the incumbent Conservative MP, Anthony Crossley in a plane crash in Denmark in August 1939. It was won by the Conservative candidate Ralph Etherton.

By-election 1939: Lancashire, Stretford Division
Party	Candidate	Votes	%	±%
Conservative	Ralph Etherton	23,408	79.8	+15.4
Ind. Labour Party	Robert Edwards	4,424	15.1	N/A
Communist	Eric Gower	1,514	5.1	New
Majority		18,984	64.7	+35.9
Turnout		29,346		
Conservative hold		Swing		
