= Apple Valley, Georgia =

Unincorporated community in Georgia, U.S.

Apple Valley
- unincorporated community
- Interactive map of Apple Valley
- Coordinates: 34°09′31″N 83°30′34″W
- Country: United States
- State: Georgia
- County: Jackson
- Post office established: 1877
- Named for: Nearby apple orchard

Apple Valley is an unincorporated community in Jackson County, in the U.S. state of Georgia.

== History ==
A post office was in operation at Apple Valley from 1877 until 1903. The community was named after an apple orchard near the original town site.
