= Jefferson Avenue Historic District =

Jefferson Avenue Historic District may refer to:

- Jefferson Avenue Historic District (Columbus, Ohio), listed on the National Register of Historic Places (NRHP)
- Jefferson Avenue Historic District (Ogden, Utah), NRHP-listed
- Jefferson Avenue Historic District (Janesville, Wisconsin), NRHP-listed

== See also ==
- Jefferson Historic District (disambiguation)
