= Clarksboro, Georgia =

Unincorporated community in Georgia, U.S.

Coordinates: 34°02′28″N 83°29′54″W

Clarksboro is an unincorporated community in Jackson County, in the U.S. state of Georgia.

== History ==
Clarksboro once served as the county seat of Jackson County. The community was named after Elijah Clarke, an American military officer. A variant spelling is "Clarksborough".
