= Seaborn M. Shankle House =

- U.S. National Register of Historic Places
- Location within Georgia
- Location: 174 Cherry St, Commerce, Georgia
- Coordinates: 34°12′09″N 83°27′18″W
- Area: 1.3 acres (0.53 ha)
- Built: 1840s, 1870s
- Architectural style: Italianate, Plain-style
- NRHP reference No.: 79000732
- Added to NRHP: November 29, 1979

The Seaborn M. Shankle House, at 125 Cherry St in Commerce, Georgia, was built in 1840s and expanded in the 1870s. It was listed on the National Register of Historic Places in 1979.

The main portion of the house, an Italianate addition in the late 1870s, is a two-story square building.
