= Holder Plantation =

- U.S. National Register of Historic Places
- Location within Georgia
- Nearest city: Jefferson, Georgia
- Area: 28 acres (11 ha)
- Built: 1850s, c.1867
- Architectural style: I-house
- NRHP reference No.: 90001408
- Added to NRHP: September 5, 1990

The Holder Plantation, located in Jackson County, Georgia near its county seat, Jefferson, was listed on the National Register of Historic Places in 1990. The plantation's main house, an I-house mainly built around 1867, and numerous outbuildings on 28 acres (11 ha) are included in the listing. It has also been known as the Plantation at Jefferson.

The I-house is a two-story addition to an earlier 1850s structure that survives as part of a rear ell.

It was recognized as a centennial farm in 1993. It is "considered regionally significant and included in the Northeast Georgia Regional Comprehensive Plan."

"The son of one owner was John N. Holder, longtime owner/editor of The Jackson Herald and five time candidate for Governor."

Historic function: Domestic; Agriculture/subsistence

Historic subfunction: Single Dwelling; Agricultural Outbuildings; Agricultural Fields

Criteria: architecture/engineering

The listing included six contributing buildings, three contributing structures, and a contributing object.
