= Mulberry River (Georgia) =

Coordinates: 34.04067°N 83.58433°W

Location
- Country: United States

Physical characteristics
- Source
  - location: Georgia

The Mulberry River is a 28.2-mile-long (45.4 km) tributary of the Middle Oconee River in the U.S. State of Georgia. It rises in southeastern Hall County (Braselton) and flows southeast, forming the boundary between Jackson and Barrow counties, to join the Middle Oconee south of Jefferson.

The river's name is an accurate preservation of the native Creek-language name Tishmaugu.

== See also ==
- List of rivers of Georgia
