= WSHF (FM) =

- Haleyville, Alabama; United States
- Frequency: 92.7 MHz
- Branding: 92.7 The Bee

Programming
- Format: Adult contemporary
- Affiliations: Westwood One

Ownership
- Owner: AMS Radio LLC
- Operator: Haleyville Broadcasting Company, LLC

History
- First air date: July 14, 1979 (as WJBB-FM)
- Former call signs: WJBB-FM (1979–2011); WWWH-FM (2011–2025)

Technical information
- Licensing authority: FCC
- Facility ID: 25851
- Class: A
- ERP: 3,900 watts
- HAAT: 73 meters (240 ft)
- Transmitter coordinates: 34°14′0.3″N 87°37′32″W

Links
- Public license information: Public file; LMS
- Website: hbtv.us

WSHF (92.7 FM) is a radio station licensed to Haleyville, Alabama, United States. The station, established in 1979 as WJBB-FM, is owned by AMS Radio, LLC.

== History ==
The Haleyville Broadcasting Company, Inc., received a construction permit from the U.S. Federal Communications Commission (FCC) to build a sister station for WJBB (1230 AM) and, after months of testing and construction, WJBB-FM began broadcast operations on July 14, 1979. The station received its broadcast license from the FCC on October 31, 1979.

Launched in 1979 with a middle of the road music format, WJBB-FM switched to a full service country music in the mid-1980s. It maintained this country format, branded as "B93", with live and local disc jockeys, local news, local farm reports, and community announcements (and some programming from Westwood One) until 2012.

From its launch in July 1979 though November 2011, the station was owned by the Slatton family. John Slatton was the president of the Haleyville Broadcasting Company, Inc., and general manager of WJBB-FM and its sister station WJBB (1230 AM) until his death in 2008. In 1986, Slatton was named ABA Broadcaster of the Year by the Alabama Broadcasters Association for his work with WJBB-AM/FM. Slatton's son, Terry Slatton, managed the station in later years.

In October 2011, The Haleyville Broadcasting Company, Inc., reached an agreement to transfer the broadcast licenses for WJBB and WJBB-FM to AMS Radio, LLC, for a combined price of $90,000. The new company was owned by Timothy and Emily A. Smyder of Marietta, Georgia. The FCC approved the deal on November 29, 2011, and the transaction was completed the next day. The new owners had the stations' call signs changed to WWWH and WWWH-FM, respectively, on December 7, 2011. On January 1, 2012, WWWH-FM switched to a hot adult contemporary music format branded as "Paradise 92.7".

AMS Radio—by then controlled by Harold Bearden—agreed to sell WWWH-FM—by this point a classic hits station, still branded "Paradise 92.7"—to a new Haleyville Broadcasting Company in early 2025 for $60,000; it began managing the station under a local marketing agreement on January 1. The call sign was changed to WSHF on March 1, 2025.After the sale, the station would rebrand to "92.7 The Bee" with the AC format intact.
