= WWWH (AM) =

Haleyville, Alabama; United States
- Broadcast area: Marion County and Franklin County, Alabama
- Frequency: 1230 kHz

Programming
- Format: News/Talk
- Affiliations: Westwood One

Ownership
- Owner: AMS Radio, LLC
- Sister stations: WWWH-FM

History
- First air date: April 1, 1949
- Last air date: February 1, 2015
- Former call signs: WJBB (1949–2011)

Technical information
- Facility ID: 25850
- Class: C
- Power: 1,000 watts (unlimited)
- Transmitter coordinates: 34°14′0.4″N 87°37′32.1″W

WWWH (1230 AM) was a 1,000-watt radio station licensed to serve the community of Haleyville, Alabama, United States. The station, established in 1949 as WJBB, was owned by AMS Radio, LLC. It last broadcast a news/talk radio format to Winston, Marion and Franklin counties.

== History ==
This station was assigned call sign WJBB in 1949 by the Federal Communications Commission (FCC) and began operating with just 250 watts of power. From 1951 though November 2011, the station was owned by the Slatton family. John Lewis Slatton was the president of The Haleyville Broadcasting Company, Inc., and general manager of WJBB (1230 AM) and its sister station WJBB-FM (92.7) until his death in 2008. In 1986, Slatton was named ABA Broadcaster of the Year by the Alabama Broadcasters Association for his work with WJBB-AM/FM. Slatton's son, Terry Slatton, managed the station in later years.

In October 2011, The Haleyville Broadcasting Company, Inc., reached an agreement to transfer the broadcast licenses for WJBB and WJBB-FM to AMS Radio, LLC, for a combined price of $90,000. The new company was owned by Timothy and Emily A. Smyder of Marietta, Georgia. The FCC approved the deal on November 29, 2011, and formal consummation of the transaction took place the next day. The new owners had the stations' call signs changed to WWWH and WWWH-FM, respectively, on December 7, 2011.

Through December 31, 2011, this station aired a full service "Good News Radio" format branded as "The Light". This included southern gospel music, live and local disc jockeys, plus local news, farm reports, community bulletins, political coverage, and other northwest Alabama happenings and events. The station aired Haleyville High School varsity football plus varsity boys and girls basketball live. The station was an affiliate of the University of Alabama college sports network.

The station flipped from full-service southern gospel to news/talk on January 1, 2012. Weekday "NewsTalk 1230" programming included "3WH Mornings" with a mix of news and information, business news from the MarketWatch radio network, plus talk shows hosted by Dennis Miller, Michael Smerconish, and Jim Bohannon.

On February 1, 2015, WWWH went silent. On July 27, 2015, WWWH turned in its license to the FCC; the FCC cancelled the license and deleted the WWWH call sign on August 4, 2015.
