= Governor L. G. Hardman House =

Historic house in Georgia, United States

- U.S. National Register of Historic Places
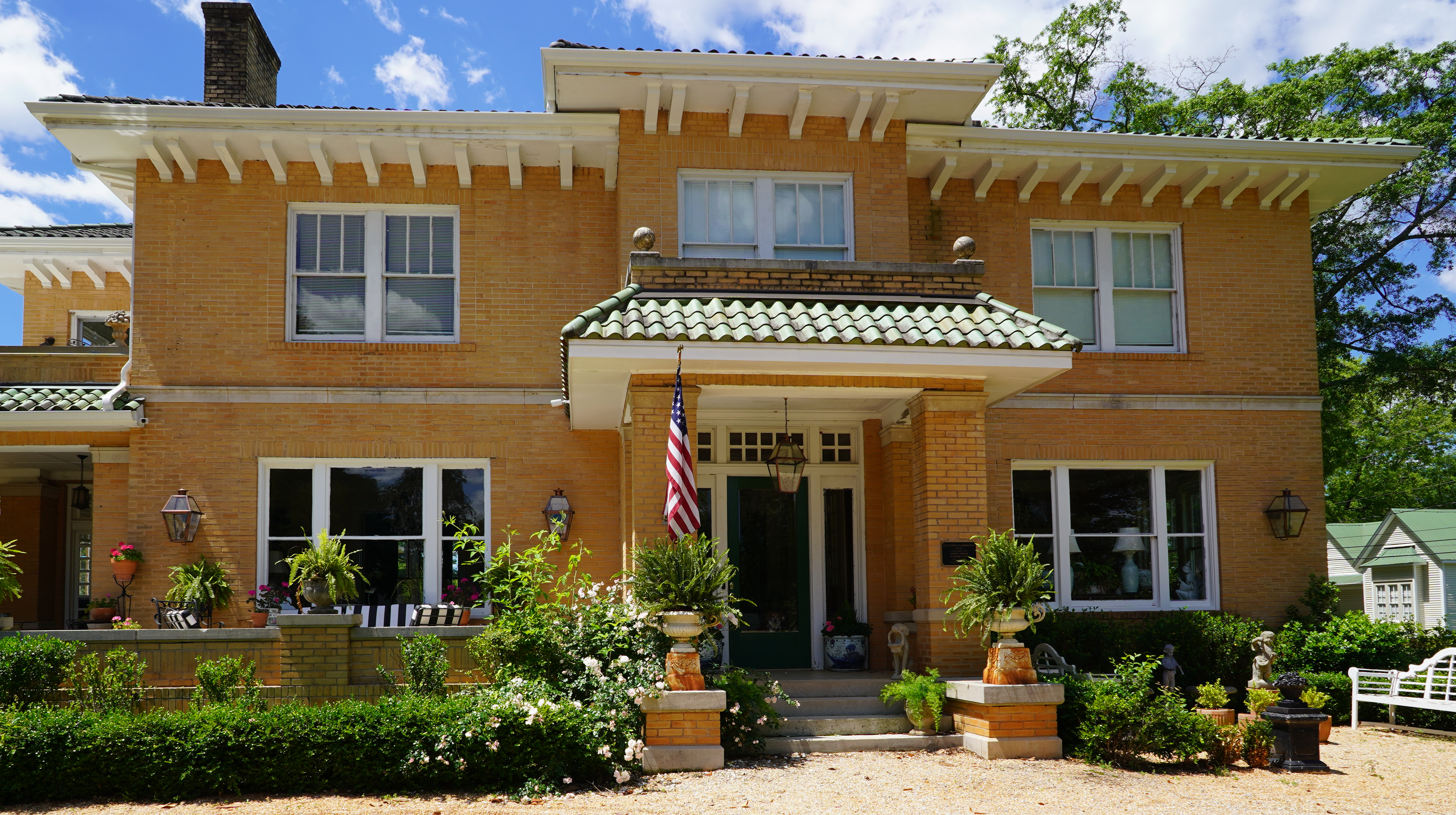
- Governor L. G. Hardman House
- Location: 208 Elm Street, Commerce, Georgia
- Coordinates: 34°12′4″N 83°27′22″W
- Area: 5 acres (2.0 ha)
- Built: 1921
- Architect: Hart, Leroy C.
- Architectural style: Late 19th and 20th Century Revivals, Mediterranean Revival
- NRHP reference No.: 88000749
- Added to NRHP: June 16, 1988

The Governor L. G. Hardman House is a historic house located at 208 Elm Street in Commerce, Georgia. It is locally significant architecturally as a "fine example" in Georgia of the Mediterranean Revival style of architecture applied to a residence.

== Description and history ==
Completed in 1921, the house was designed by architect Leroy C. Hart in Mediterranean Revival architecture, one variety of Late 19th and 20th Century Revivals architecture. It was originally built as the home of Georgia governor Lamartine Griffin Hardman (1856–1937), who governed during 1927–1931. The 5-acre (2.0 ha) listing included two contributing buildings. It was listed on the National Register of Historic Places on June 16, 1988.
