= List of bridges on the National Register of Historic Places in Georgia =

This is a list of bridges and tunnels on the National Register of Historic Places in the U.S. state of Georgia.

Name	Image	Built	Listed	Location	County	Type
Auchumpkee Creek Covered Bridge		1898	1975-04-01	Thomaston; 32°45′20″N 84°13′55″W	Upson	Covered Town lattice truss
Coheelee Creek Covered Bridge		1883	1976-05-13	Hilton; 31°18′25″N 85°4′40″W	Early	Covered modified kingpost truss
College Avenue Bridge		1893	2022-03-22	Stone Mountain; 33°48′12.2″N 84°07′59.2″W	DeKalb County	Covered
Cromer's Mill Covered Bridge		1907	1976-08-17	Carnesville; 34°16′31″N 83°15′57″W	Franklin	Covered Town lattice truss
Elder's Mill Covered Bridge and Elder Mill		1897, 1900	1994-05-05	Watkinsville; 33°48′11″N 83°21′49″W	Oconee	Covered
Howard's Covered Bridge		1905	1975-07-01	Smithsonia; 33°59′9″N 83°8′1″W	Oglethorpe	Covered Town lattice truss
Kesler Covered Bridge		1925	1975-06-18	Homer; 34°25′27″N 83°23′16″W	Banks	Covered kingpost & queenpost truss
Kilgore Mill Covered Bridge and Mill Site		1894	1975-04-14	Bethlehem; 33°54′0″N 83°44′25″W	Barrow	Covered Town lattice truss
New Salem Covered Bridge		1915	1975-06-10	Commerce; 34°15′30″N 83°25′20″W	Banks	Covered multiple kingpost truss
Poole's Mill Covered Bridge		1900, 1901	1975-04-01	Cumming; 34°17′20″N 84°14′35″W	Forsyth	Covered Town lattice truss
Railroad Overpass at Ocmulgee		ca. 1870	1979-12-18	Macon; 32°50′27″N 83°35′59″W	Bibb	
Red Oak Creek Covered Bridge	Red Oak Creek Covered Bridge	ca. 1840	1973-05-07	Woodbury; 33°2′18″N 84°33′12″W	Meriwether	Covered Town truss
Ruff's Mill and Concord Covered Bridge		1864, 1872	1980-11-24	Smyrna; 33°50′56″N 84°33′30″W	Cobb	Covered
Watson Mill Covered Bridge and Mill Historic District	Watson Mill Covered Bridge	1868, 1885, ca. 1906	1991-09-05	Comer	Oglethorpe	Covered Town lattice truss
Western and Atlantic Railroad Tunnel at Tunnel Hill	Western and Atlantic Railroad Tunnel at Tunnel Hill	1850	2002-01-11	Tunnel Hill; 34°50′20″N 85°2′9″W	Whitfield	
White Oak Creek Covered Bridge		ca. 1880	1973-06-19	Alvaton; 33°9′0″N 84°33′2″W	Meriwether	Covered Long truss
