= List of covered bridges in Georgia =

There are 16 wooden covered bridges in the U.S. state of Georgia.

== Existing covered bridges ==
Name	Image	Location^{[A]}	Year built	Length	Crosses	Design	Historical Notes
Auchumpkee Creek Covered Bridge		Thomaston, Upson County 32.7556°N 84.2302°W; Geographic data related to Auchumpkee Creek Covered Bridge at OpenStreetMap	1892, rebuilt 1997	96 feet (29 m)	Auchumpkee Creek	Town lattice	Listed on the National Register of Historic Places
Big Red Oak Creek Covered Bridge	Red Oak Creek Covered Bridge	Woodbury, Meriwether County	c. 1840s	252.5 feet (77.0 m)	Red Oak Creek	Town lattice	Listed on the National Register of Historic Places
Wehadkee Creek Bridge-formerly Callaway Gardens Covered Bridge		LaGrange, Troup County	1873; rebuilt in 1890	60 feet (18 m)	Cary Branch	Town lattice	
Coheelee Creek Covered Bridge		Blakely, Early County; 31°18′23″N 85°04′43″W	1891	96 feet (29 m)	Coheelee Creek	Modified Queen Post	Listed on the National Register of Historic Places
Concord Covered Bridge	Concord Covered Bridge	Smyrna, Cobb County	1872	131.7 feet (40.1 m)	Nickajack Creek	Queen-rod	Listed on the National Register of Historic Places
Cromer's Mill Covered Bridge	Cromer's Mill Covered Bridge	Carnesville, Franklin County	1906	132 feet (40 m)	Nails Creek	Town lattice	Listed on the National Register of Historic Places
Elder's Mill Covered Bridge		Watkinsville, Oconee County	1897	100 feet (30 m)	Rose Creek	Town lattice	Listed on the National Register of Historic Places
Euharlee Covered Bridge	Euharlee Covered Bridge	Euharlee, Bartow County	1886	137.6 feet (41.9 m)	Euharlee Creek	Town lattice	
Howard's Covered Bridge		Oglethorpe County	1905	168 feet (51 m)	Big Clouds Creek	Town lattice	Listed on the National Register of Historic Places
Hurricane Shoals Covered Bridge		Maysville, Jackson County	1884, burned in 1972, rebuilt 2002	127 feet (39 m)	North Oconee River	Town lattice	
Kesler Covered Bridge		Homer, Banks County	1925 (Collapsed between 1978-1981)	69 feet (21 m)	Broad River	King post to one side, Queen post to the other	Listed on the National Register of Historic Places
Kilgore Mill Covered Bridge	Kilgore Mill Covered Bridge	boundary between Barrow County and Walton County	1894 (destroyed by arson on April 23, 1993)	117 feet (36 m)	Apalachee River	Town lattice	Listed on the National Register of Historic Places
Lula Covered Bridge		Gainesville, Hall County	1915	34 feet (10 m)	Grove Creek	King post	Also known as Blind Susie Covered Bridge, locally.
New Salem Covered Bridge		Commerce, Jackson County	1915, collapsed 1984.	47 feet (14 m)	Grove Creek	King post	Listed on the National Register of Historic Places
Poole's Mill Covered Bridge	Poole's Mill Covered Bridge	Cumming, Forsyth County	1901	94.6 feet (28.8 m)	Settendown Creek	Town lattice	Listed on the National Register of Historic Places
Rockdale County Covered Bridge		Conyers, Rockdale County	1997	150 feet (46 m)	Mill Rock Creek	Decorative lattice	
Stone Mountain Covered Bridge	Stone Mountain Covered Bridge	Stone Mountain Park, DeKalb County	1891	151 feet (46 m)	Stone Mountain Park Lake	Town lattice	
Stovall Mill Covered Bridge	Stovall Mill Covered Bridge	Helen, White County	1895	36.8 feet (11.2 m)	Chickamauga Creek	Queen post	
Watson Mill Bridge State Park	Watson Mill Covered Bridge	Comer, Madison County	1885	228.6 feet (69.7 m)	South fork of the Broad River	Town lattice	Listed on the National Register of Historic Places
White Oak Creek Covered Bridge	White Oak Covered Bridge	Alvaton, Meriwether County	1880, burned in 1985	N/A	N/A	Town lattice	Listed on the National Register of Historic Places

- ^{A} Sorting this column will result in bridges being listed in order by county.

== See also ==
- List of bridges on the National Register of Historic Places in Georgia
- World Guide to Covered Bridges
