= Nacoochee =

Nacoochee can refer to several locations in northeast Georgia:

- Sautee Nacoochee, Georgia, in White County, incorporating the Nacoochee Mound and the Nacoochee Valley Historic District
- Nacoochee Mound, a prehistoric mound
- Rabun Gap-Nacoochee School, a private, college-preparatory school
- Stovall Mill Covered Bridge, also known as Nacoochee Bridge
