= Alvaton =

Alvaton may refer to:

- Alvaton, Georgia, an unincorporated community
- Alvaton, Kentucky, an unincorporated community
