= White Oak Creek Covered Bridge =

- U.S. National Register of Historic Places
- Location within Georgia
- Nearest city: Alvaton, Georgia
- Coordinates: 33°09′00″N 84°33′02″W
- Area: less than one acre
- Built: c.1880
- Built by: King, Horace
- Architectural style: Long-truss covered bridge
- NRHP reference No.: 73000627
- Added to NRHP: June 19, 1973

The White Oak Creek Covered Bridge, near Alvaton, Georgia, was built in 1880. It was listed on the National Register of Historic Places in 1973.

It was a c.1880 work, probably of Horace King, a former slave born in 1807. It is a Long-truss covered bridge.

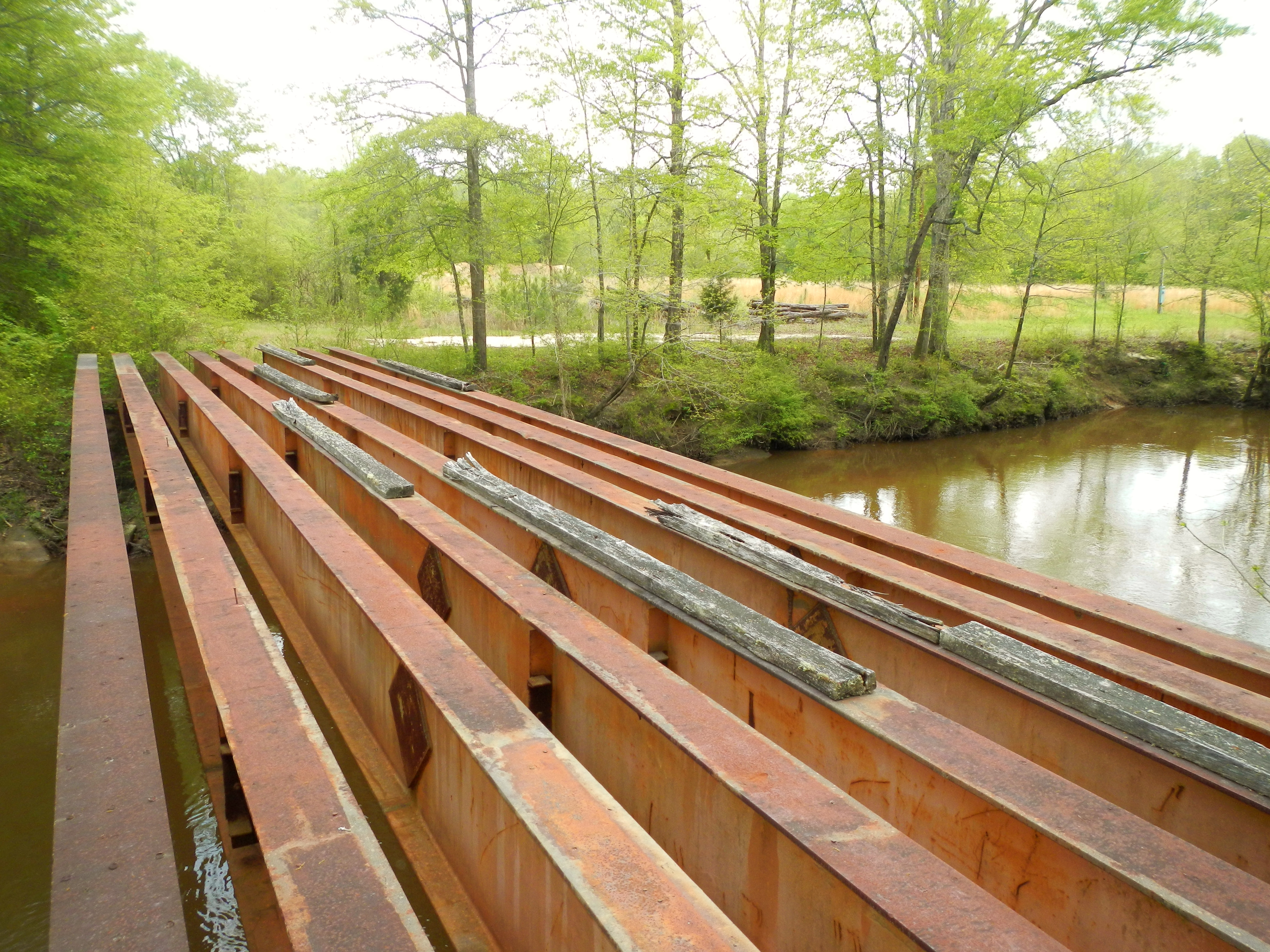
Remains of the bridge in April 2013

It is located southeast of Alvaton on Covered Bridge Rd. It burned down in 1985. Only metal pilings and a skeleton of the deck remain.
