= Bridge House (Albany, Georgia) =

Historic house in Georgia, United States

- U.S. National Register of Historic Places
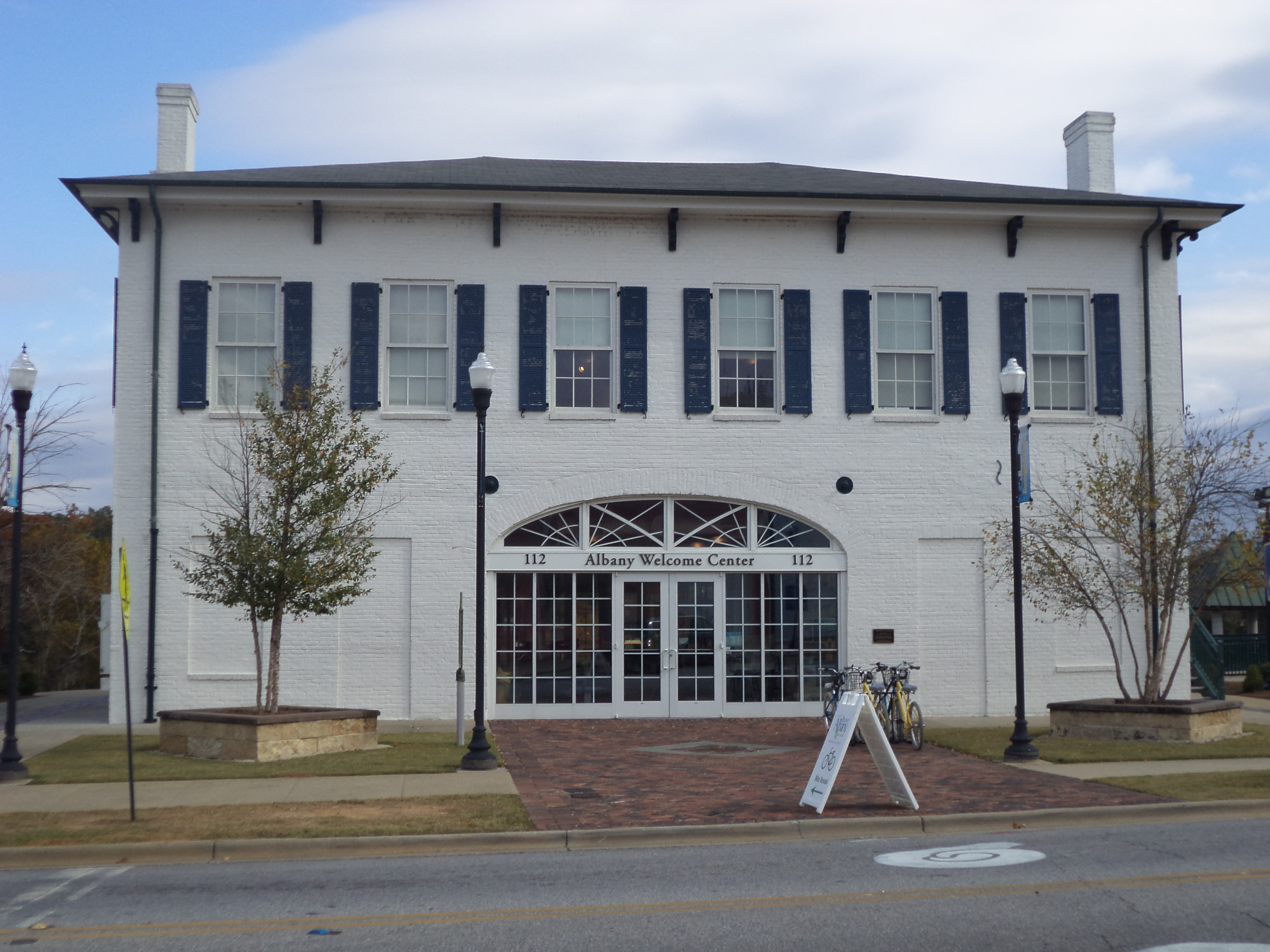
- The Albany Welcome Center in the former Bridge House in Albany, Georgia

- Location within Georgia Location within the United States
- Location: 112 N. Front St., Albany, Georgia
- Coordinates: 31°34′40″N 84°8′56″W
- Area: 1 acre (0.40 ha)
- Built: 1857
- Architectural style: Italianate
- NRHP reference No.: 74000672
- Added to NRHP: November 19, 1974

The Albany Welcome Center, formerly known as the Bridge House, is a historic residential building in Albany, Georgia. It was designed by African American architect and engineer Horace King and built in 1858. It was added to the National Register of Historic Places on November 19, 1974. It is located at 112 North Front Street.

Born into slavery, King was granted special rights by the Alabama Legislature in 1858 and was a successful engineer and architect of bridges in the American South. Colonel Nelson Tift hired him in 1858 to build a covered bridge across the Flint River at Albany and King's design included an adjoining Bridge House that served as a gateway to the city.

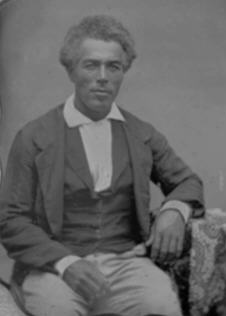
Horace King ca. 1855

The home's cellars were used during the American Civil War for a meat packing operation to feed Confederate soldiers, and the grounds were used as for the slaughter of thousands of cows, hogs and sheep that were pickled in barrels.

On the second floor is a room known as "Tift's Hall" that was made into a theater. It was described as the social center of Albany. Tift hired artists from New York to decorate the hall's walls and ceilings with ornate frescoes. The room was used to host actors, hold dances, stage plays, and was also used for Ku Klux Klan meetings.

In 1887, Nelson Tift sold his bridge rights to Dougherty County, which later built a new bridge south of the Bridge House. The building was home for several decades to an auto parts store, and following the Flood of 1994, was purchased by Dougherty County as part of downtown Albany's redevelopment. The Bridge House was meticulously restored under the direction of David Maschke, a local architect, and reopened as the Albany Welcome Center in August 2008.

== See also ==
- National Register of Historic Places listings in Dougherty County, Georgia
