= Red Oak Creek Covered Bridge =

- U.S. National Register of Historic Places
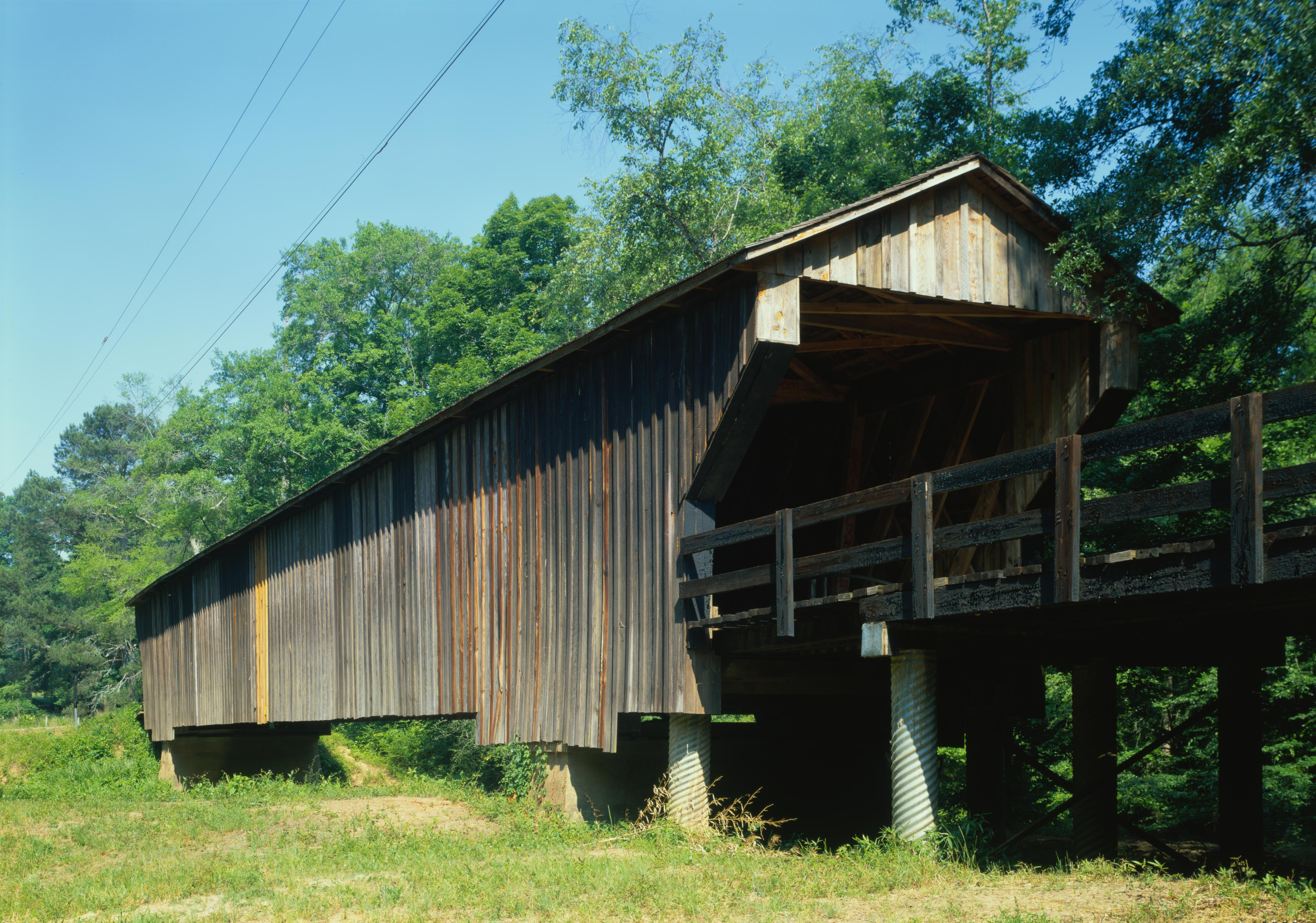

- Location within Georgia
- Location: North of Woodbury on Covered Bridge Road, Woodbury, Georgia
- Coordinates: 33°02′18″N 84°33′12″W
- Area: less than one acre
- Built: c. 1840
- Built by: Horace King
- Architectural style: Covered Town lattice truss
- NRHP reference No.: 73000632
- Added to NRHP: May 7, 1973

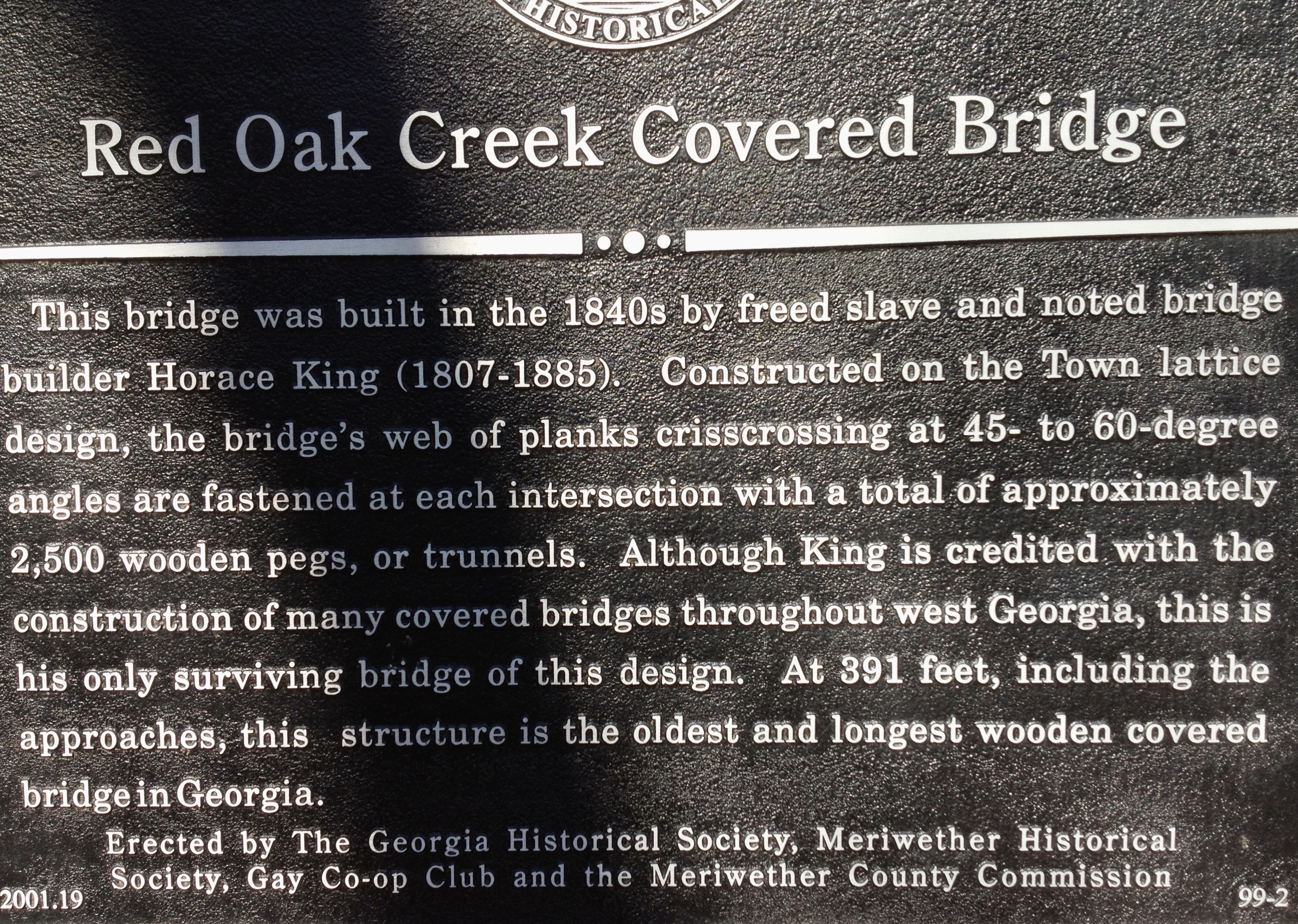
Red Oak Covered Bridge Historic Marker

The Red Oak Creek Covered Bridge carries Covered Bridge Road (historically Huel Brown Road) across Red Oak Creek north of Woodbury, Georgia. It was listed on the National Register of Historic Places in 1973.

The bridge is a covered Town lattice truss and has also been known as Big Red Oak Creek Bridge.

It was probably built by Horace King, a slave, in about 1840.

The bridge's covered portion is 116 feet (35 m) long while its total span is 412 feet (126 m) long, which is the longest total span of any covered bridge in Georgia. Its long sills were sawn from heart pine and are 15 by 15 inches (38 cm × 38 cm) in dimension. It is held together by approximately 2,500 wooden pegs also known as trunnels.

When listed in 1973, the bridge was still in use. It was thought to possibly be the oldest covered bridge in Georgia, and to be "an outstanding reminder of the age when there were over 250 covered bridges in Georgia."

== See also ==
- List of bridges on the National Register of Historic Places in Georgia
- List of bridges documented by the Historic American Engineering Record in Georgia (U.S. state)
- List of covered bridges in Georgia
