= Auchumpkee Creek Covered Bridge =

- U.S. National Register of Historic Places
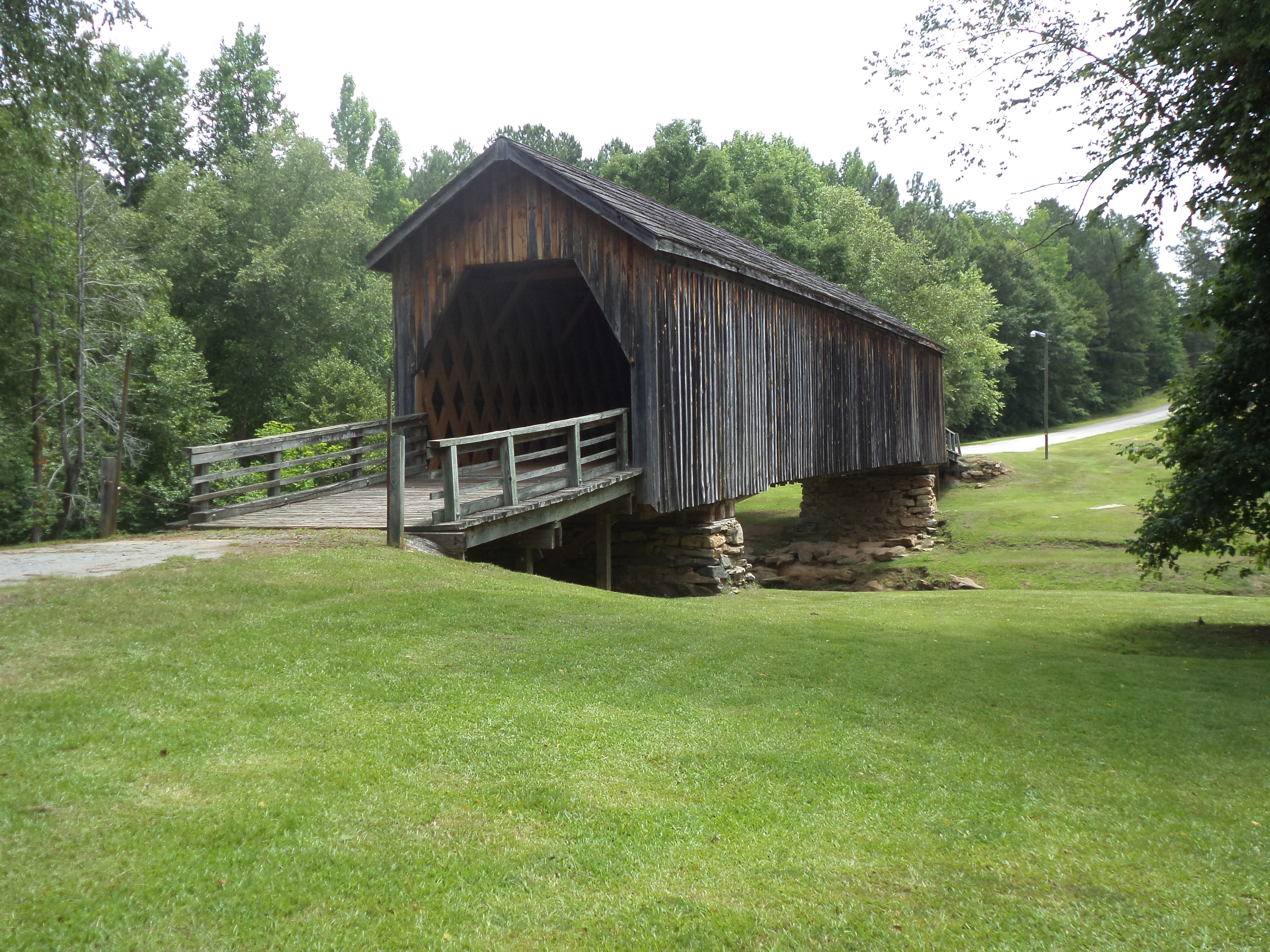

- Location within Georgia
- Nearest city: Thomaston, Georgia
- Coordinates: 32°45′20″N 84°13′55″W
- Area: less than one acre
- Built: 1892
- Built by: Herring, Dr. J.W.
- Architectural style: Town Lattice Truss Bridge
- NRHP reference No.: 75000614
- Added to NRHP: April 1, 1975

The Auchumpkee Creek Covered Bridge, near Thomaston, Georgia, was originally built in 1892, destroyed by a flood in 1994, and rebuilt using original timbers and traditional methods in 1997. It was listed on the National Register of Historic Places in 1975.

It is a Town lattice truss bridge. It has also been called the Hootenville Covered Bridge.

It is located about 10 miles (16 km) southeast of Thomaston, about 1 mile (1.6 km) off U.S. 19 on Allen Rd.

"It spans Auchumpkee Creek in the Hootenville Militia District of Upson County, Georgia. The bridge is completely covered and extends 120 feet 9 inches in length resting on two native stone piers held together with cement."

== See also ==
- List of covered bridges in Georgia
