= Hurricane Shoals Covered Bridge =

Bridge in Jackson County, Georgia, USA

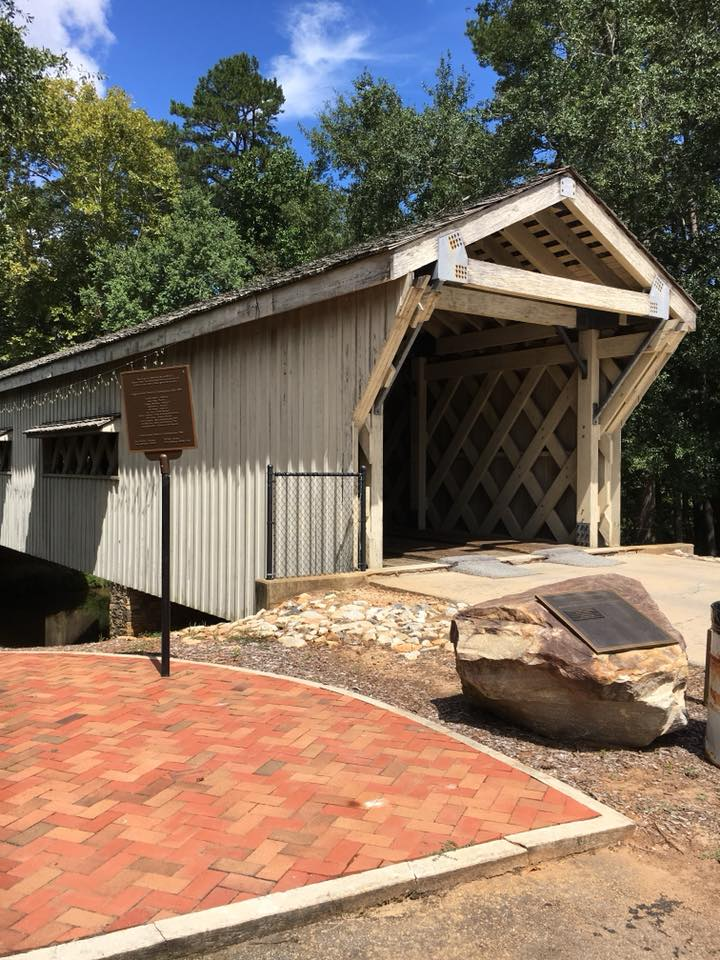
- Coordinates: 34°12′49.9″N 83°32′35.4″W

Characteristics
- Design: Town lattice
- Total length: 127 feet

History
- Built: 1884
- Rebuilt: 2002
- Destroyed: 1972

Location
- Interactive map of Hurricane Shoals Covered Bridge

The Hurricane Shoals Covered Bridge is a covered bridge in Jackson County, Georgia over the North Oconee River.

== History ==
On September 16, 1869, the Jackson County Court of Ordinary ordered that a new bridge be built across the river at Hurricane Shoals. It cost $1,443 to build. On May 31, 1972, vandals burned the bridge. With no one to oversee the area, it became littered with beer bottles, junk cars, and trash. In 1997, Jackson County received a $35,000 grant to help with the reconstruction of the bridge. On September 22, 2002, the bridge was fully rebuilt.

== See also ==
- List of covered bridges in Georgia
