= Nails Creek =

Stream in Georgia, U.S.

Coordinates: 34°14′40.39″N 83°12′39.54″W

Nails Creek is a stream in the U.S. state of Georgia. It is a tributary to the Hudson River. Variant names are "Nail Creek" and "Nealls Creek".

== See also ==
- Cromer's Mill Covered Bridge
