= Nickajack Creek =

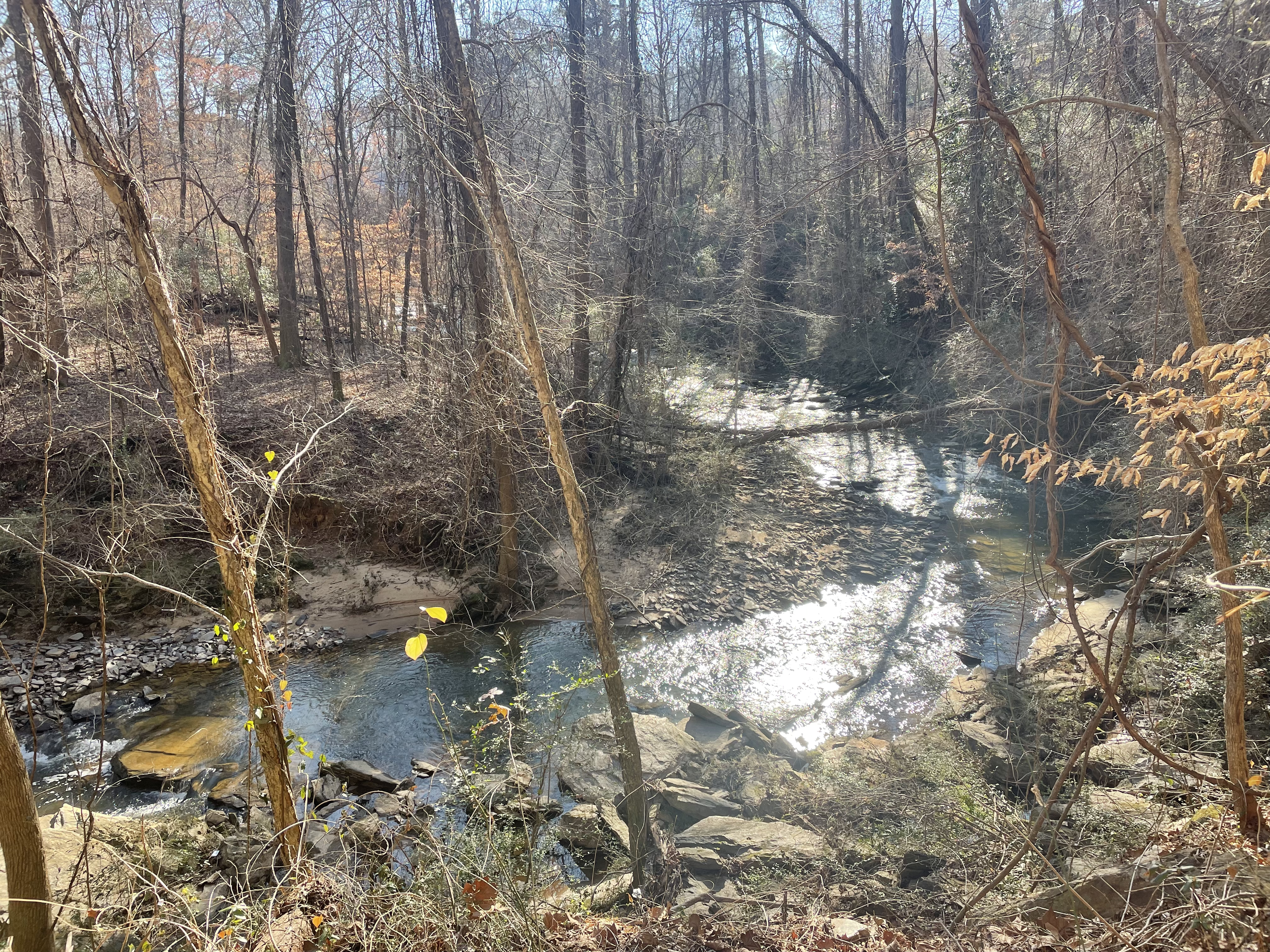
- Nickajack Creek near the Concord Covered Bridge

Physical characteristics
- Source: Groundwater
  - location: Marietta, Georgia
  - coordinates: 33.913192°N 84.541182°W
  - elevation: 1,056.4 ft (322.0 m)
- Mouth: Chattahoochee River
  - location: Mableton, Georgia
  - coordinates: 33.788083°N 84.520423°W
  - elevation: 731.6 ft (223.0 m)

Nickajack Creek is a stream in Cobb and Fulton counties in the U.S. state of Georgia. It is a tributary to the Chattahoochee River. Groundwater serves as the water source, with the creek beginning in Marietta, Georgia. The creek runs through the city of Smyrna and terminates at the Chattahoochee River in the town of Mableton.

== History and notable landmarks ==
Tradition states Nickajack Creek was named after a local Cherokee person, possibly the chief of a village that bore his name. One of the earliest known records of white Europeans being aware of the village inhabitants is an 1839 map depicting a 'Nickajack Creek' converging with the Chattahoochee River south and west of the Standing Peachtree settlement.

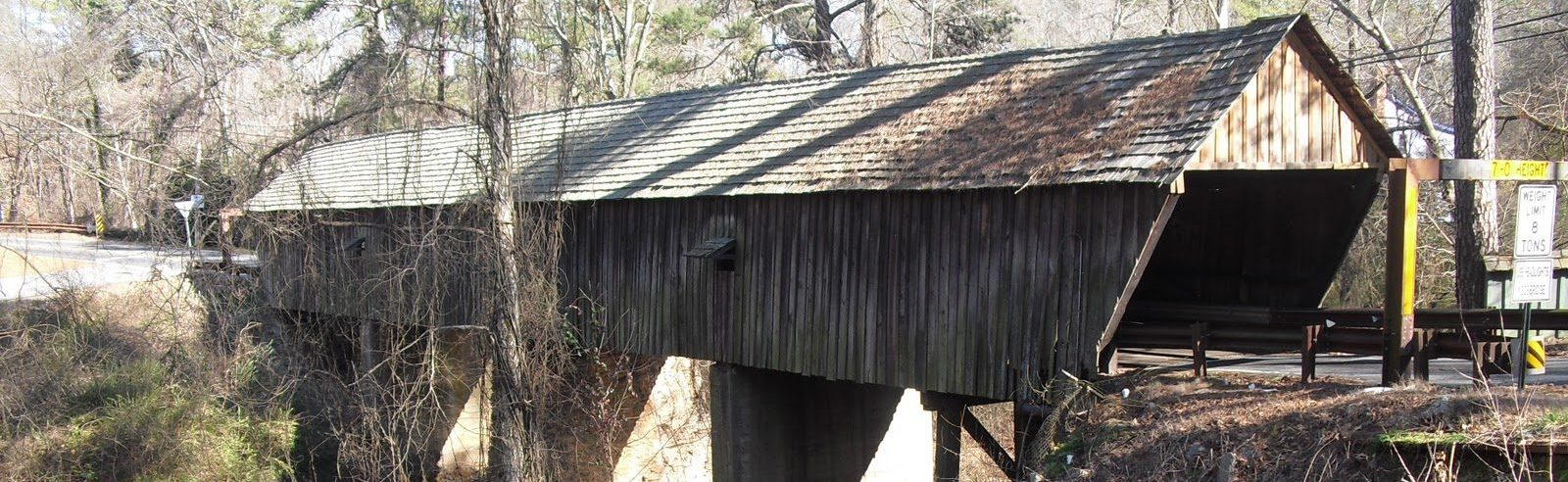
The Concord Covered Bridge spanning Nickajack Creek, largely unchanged in appearance from 1872

White European settlers moved into Nickajack Creek in the mid-1800s. They formed a community initially known as 'Mill Grove', and later 'Nickajack.' The creek provided ample power to run grist, saw, cotton, and woolen mills. Robert Mable, founder of Mableton, assisted in building a gristmill owned by Henry Clay Ruff in the 1850s. Mable refined his skills as a millwright under the mentorship of Robert E. Lee at Fort Pulaski. Both Ruff's home and his mill remain standing in the portion of the creek running through Smyrna.

On July 4, 1864, Union and Confederate troops clashed at Nickajack Creek in the Battle of Ruff's Mill.

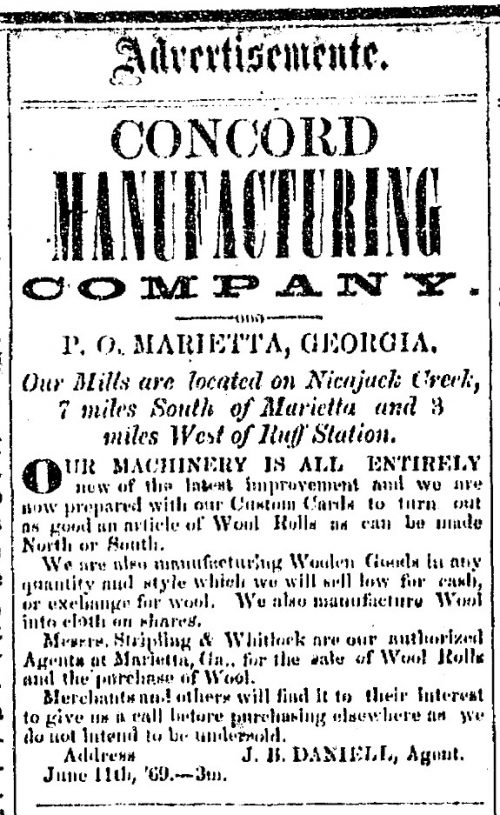
Advertisement for the Concord Manufacturing Company on Nickajack Creek, 1869

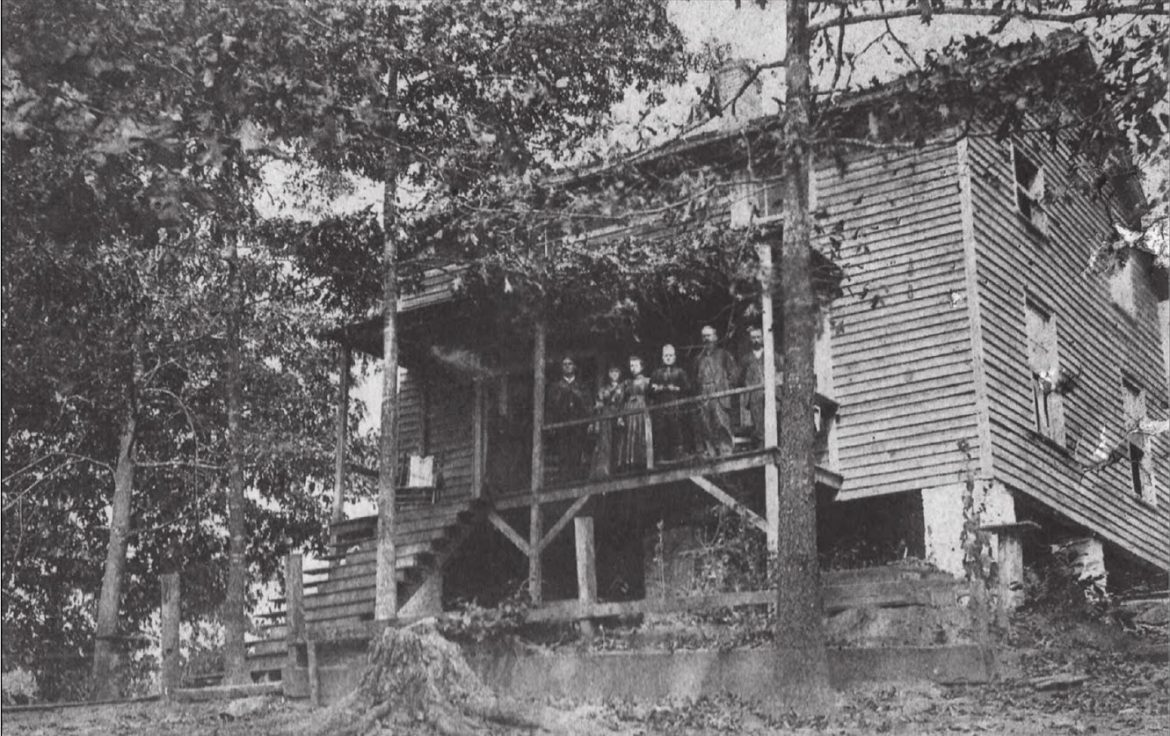
The factory superintendent's home, late 1800s

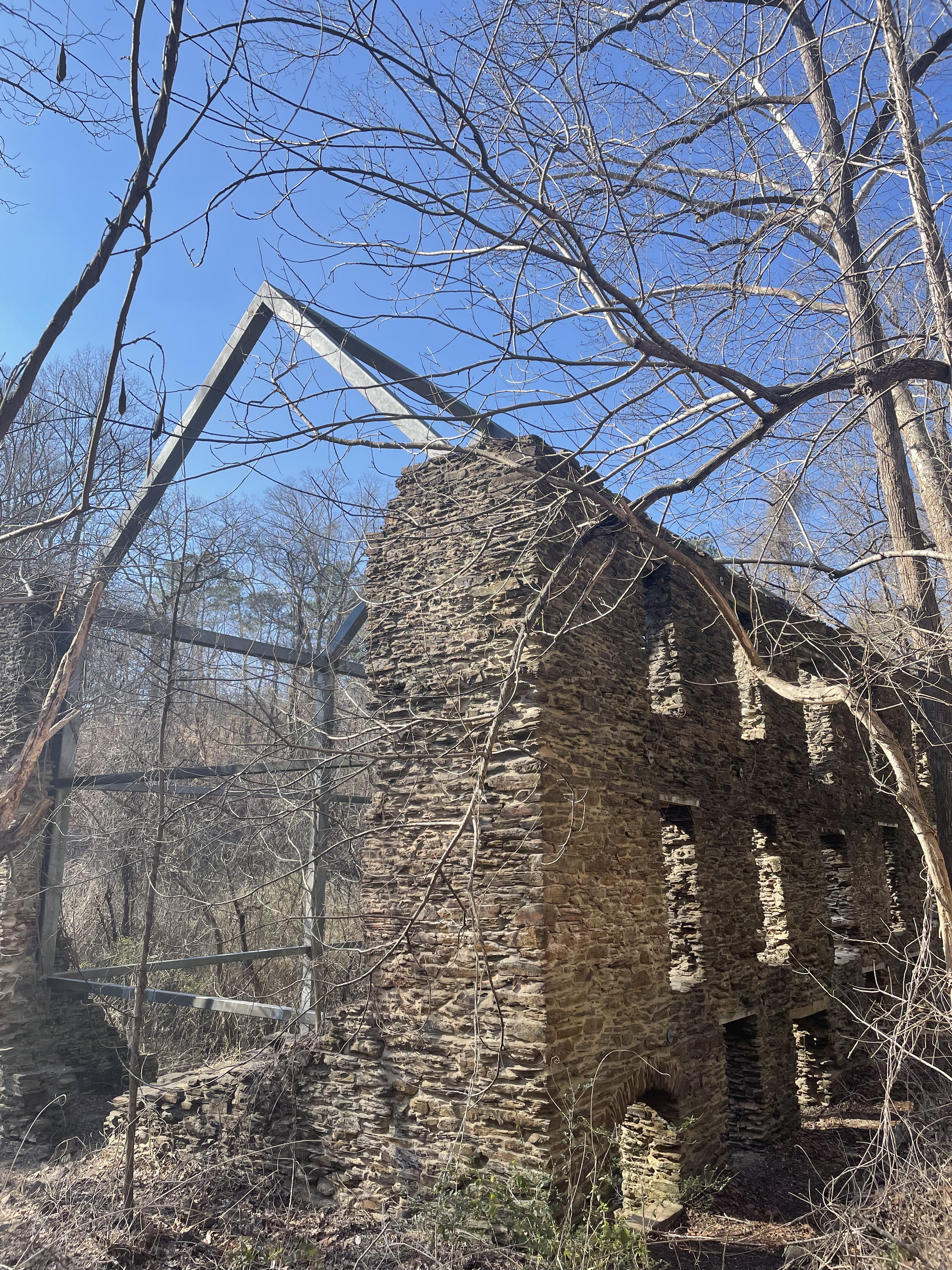
Ruins of the mill today

After the war, the Concord Manufacturing Company established a woolen mill on the stream in 1869 and made a significant economic contribution to Cobb County. The mill suffered a fire in 1889. Remnants can still be seen today.

A covered bridge, originally built c. 1848–1850, traverses the stream. It is one of the few remaining covered bridges in Georgia, and still highly active today after it was later buttressed to handle automobile traffic.

Ruff's mill, house, the Concord woolen mill, and the covered bridge are part of the Concord Covered Bridge Historic District.
