= Settingdown Creek =

Stream in Georgia, U.S.

Coordinates: 34°17′45.34″N 84°15′54.71″W

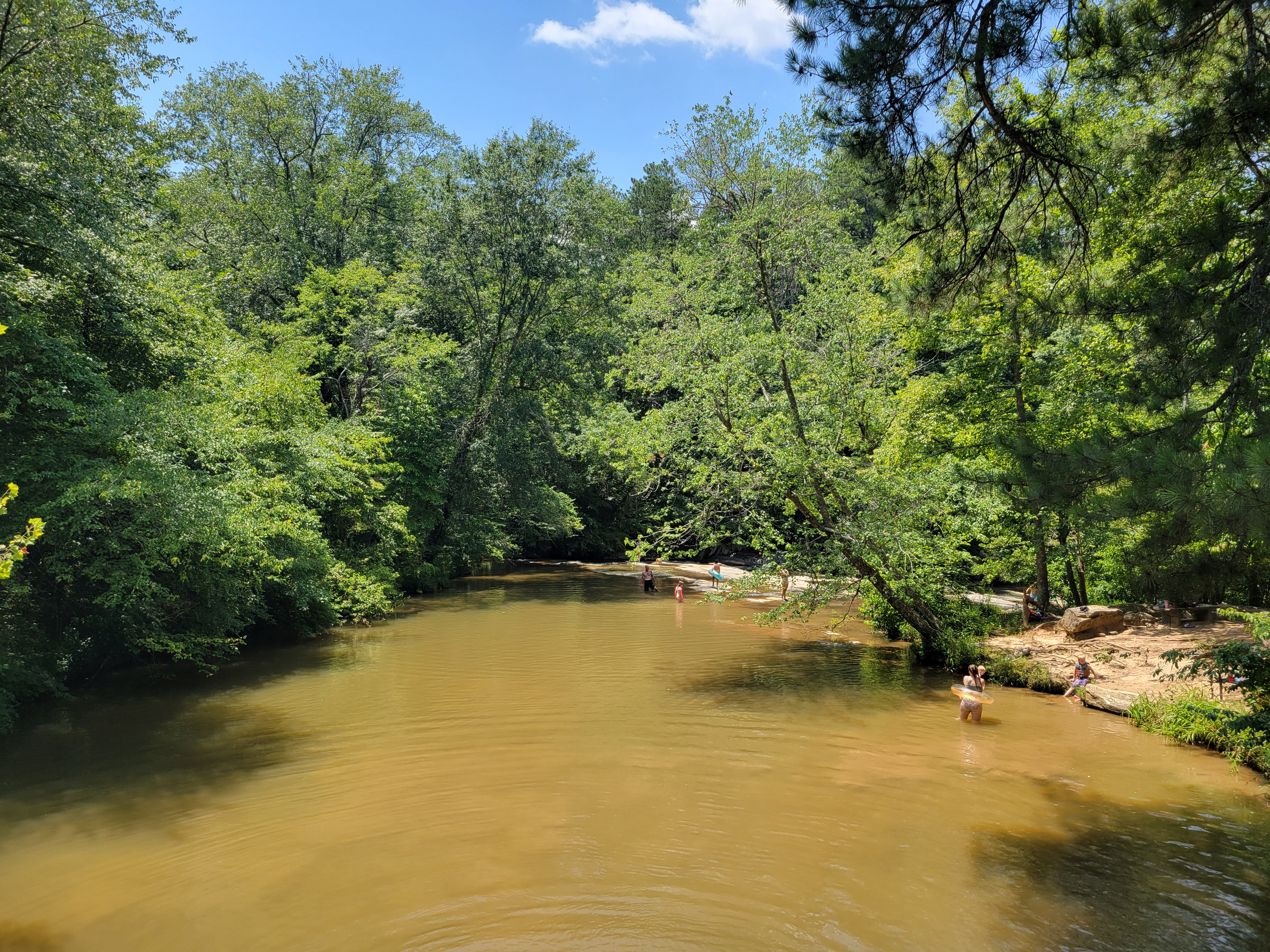
Settingdown Creek from Poole's Mill Covered Bridge

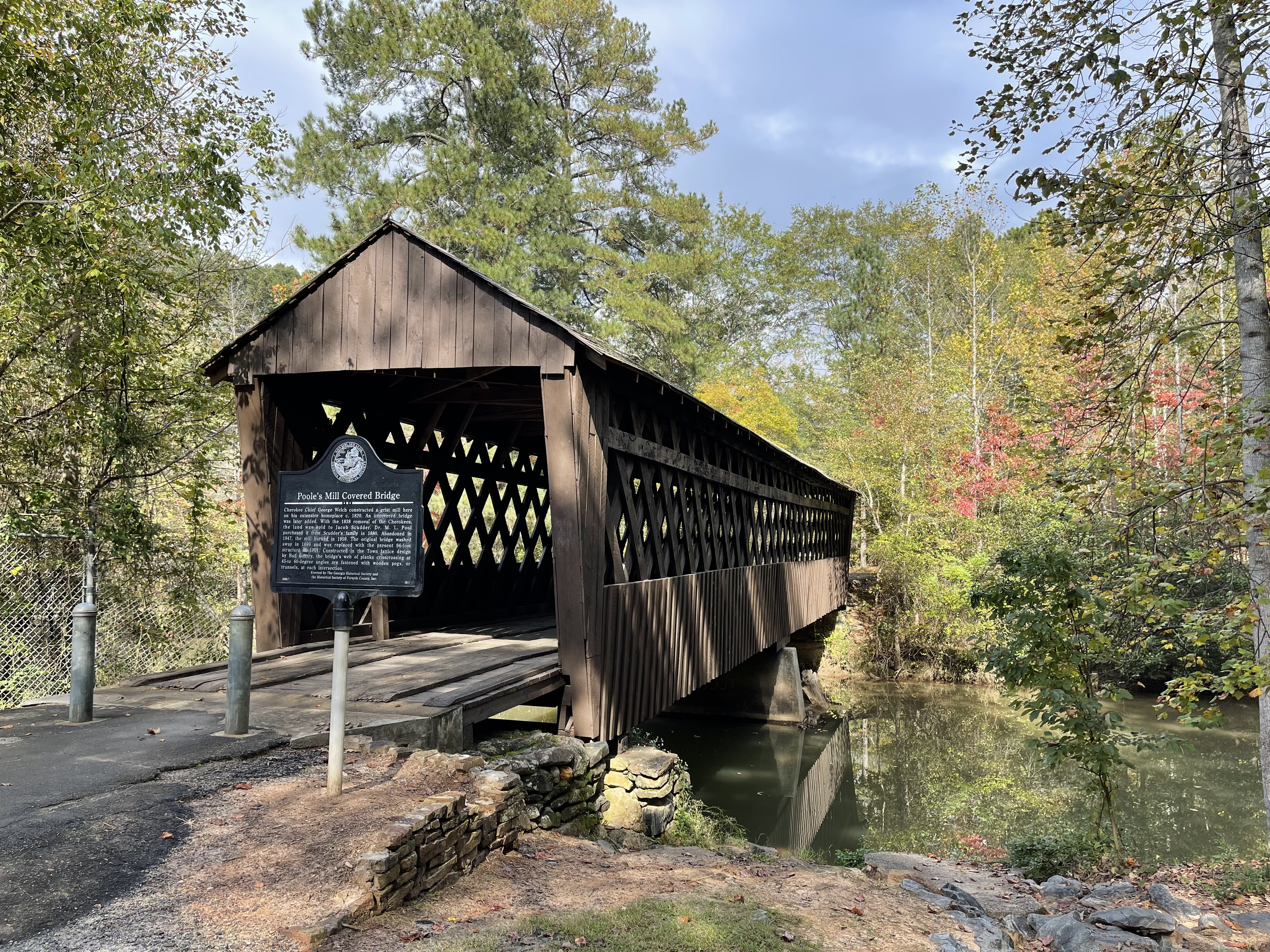
Poole's Mill Covered Bridge

Settingdown Creek is a stream in the U.S. state of Georgia. It is a tributary to the Etowah River.

The stream was named after Setten Down, a Cherokee chieftain. Variant names are "Settendown Creek", "Sitting Down Creek", "Sittingdon Creek", and "Sittingdown Creek"
