= Horace King (architect) =

American architect (1807–1885)

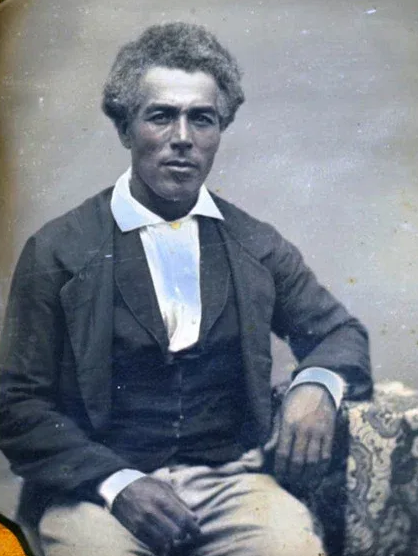
- A ca. 1855 daguerreotype of King

Member of the Alabama House of Representatives
- In office 1868–1872

Personal details
- Born: September 8, 1807 Chesterfield County, South Carolina, U.S.
- Died: May 28, 1885 (aged 77) Lagrange, Georgia, U.S.
- Party: Republican
- Occupation: Architect, engineer, contractor

Horace King (sometimes Horace Godwin) (September 8, 1807 – May 28, 1885) was a Black-American architect, engineer, and bridge builder. He is considered the most respected bridge builder of the 19th century Deep South, constructing dozens of bridges in Alabama, Georgia, and Mississippi.

King was born into slavery on a South Carolina plantation in 1807. In 1830, he was sold to the contractor John Godwin, who taught King to read, write, and build despite prohibitions on teaching enslaved people. Between 1833 and 1846, he was a partner in Godwin's contracting business, building bridges, courthouses, and warehouses. King purchased his freedom in 1846 and embarked on a successful career as an independent builder, playing a major role in the construction of Alabama's State Capitol. He may have even purchased an enslaved person. During the Civil War, he was conscripted by Confederate authorities to build military structures, and contributed to the construction of some of the Confederacy's ironclads. After the end of the war, he continued his construction business, and spent two terms in the Alabama House of Representatives. Affectionately known as "Prince of Bridge Builders", he built bridges, warehouses, houses, and churches, and was known for his service to his community. He died in 1885, and passed on his business to his sons.

== Early career ==
Horace King was born enslaved in 1807 in the Cheraw District of South Carolina, in present-day Chesterfield County. His ancestry was a mix of African, European, and Catawba. Late 19th-century biographer F. L. Cherry described his complexion as showing more "Indian blood than any other." Taught to read and write early, King became a proficient carpenter and mechanic by his teenage years.

Records indicate that King spent his first 23 years near his birthplace, with his first introduction to bridge construction in 1824. In 1824, bridge architect Ithiel Town came to Cheraw to assist in the construction of a bridge over the Pee Dee River. While it is unknown whether King assisted in the construction of this bridge or its replacement span built in 1828, Town's lattice truss design, used in both Pee Dee bridges, became a hallmark of King's future work.

When King's enslaver died around 1830, King was sold to John Godwin, a contractor who also worked on the Pee Dee bridge. King may have been related to the family of Godwin's wife, Ann Wright. In 1832, Godwin received a contract to construct a 560-foot (170 m) bridge across the Chattahoochee River from Columbus, Georgia to Girard, Alabama (today Phenix City). Initially living in Columbus, he moved to Girard in 1833, taking King with him. The pair began many other construction projects, including house building. They built Godwin's house first, then King's. Many speculative houses followed this, and the two men completed nearly every early house in Girard. The Columbus City Bridge was the first known to be built by King, who likely planned the bridge's construction and managed the slave laborers who built the span.

== Rise to prominence ==
Between the completion of the Columbus City Bridge in 1833 and the early 1840s, King and Godwin partnered on eight major construction projects throughout the Southern United States. In 1834, the partners constructed forty cotton warehouses in Apalachicola, Florida. The two men designed and built the courthouses of Muscogee County, Georgia, and Russell County, Alabama, from 1839 to 1841, and bridges in West Point, Georgia (1838), Eufaula, Alabama (1838–39), Florence, Georgia (1840). They built a replacement for their Columbus City Bridge between Columbus and Girard in 1841, after an 1838 flood destroyed the original.

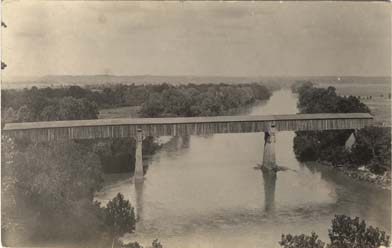
Bridge completed in 1839 by King over the Chattahoochee River at Eufaula, Alabama

During a time of financial difficulty, in 1837, Godwin transferred the enslavement of King to his wife and her uncle, William Carney Wright of Montgomery, Alabama. Godwin may have done this to prevent his creditors from obtaining King. Wright allowed King to marry Frances Gould Thomas, a free woman of color, in April 1839. It was highly uncommon for enslavers to allow such marriages; Frances' free status meant that their children would all be born free. Slavery states had incorporated the principle of partus sequitur ventrem into law since the colonial period, which said that children took the social status of their mothers, whether enslaved or free.

By 1840, King was publicly acknowledged as a "co-builder" with Godwin, an uncommon honor for an enslaved person. King's prominence had eclipsed Godwin's by the early 1840s. King worked independently as architect and superintendent of major bridge projects in Columbus, Mississippi, (1843) and Wetumpka, Alabama, (1844). While working on the Eufaula bridge, King met Tuscaloosa attorney and entrepreneur Robert Jemison, Jr., who soon began using King on several projects in Lowndes County, Mississippi, including the 420-foot (130 m) Columbus, Mississippi bridge. Jemison would remain King's friend and associate for the rest of his life. King bridged the Tallapoosa River at Tallassee, Alabama in 1845. Later that same year, he built three small bridges for Jemison near Steens, Mississippi, where the latter owned several mills.

== Freedom ==
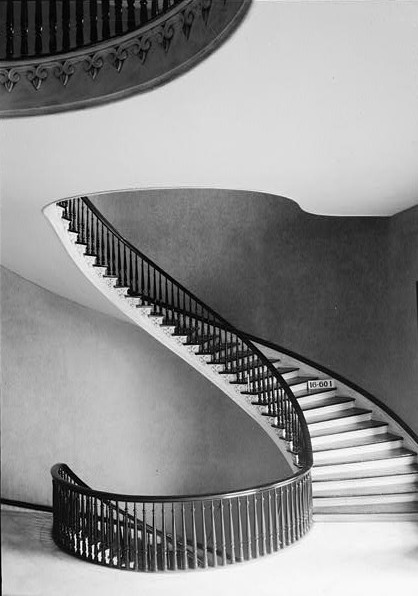
Horace King used bridge-building techniques to design the spiral staircase in the Alabama State Capitol so that a central support was not required.

Despite his enslavement, King was allowed to keep a significant income from his work. In 1846, he used some of his earnings to purchase his freedom from the Godwin family and Wright. However, under Alabama law of the time, a formerly enslaved person was allowed to remain in the state only for a year after manumission. Jemison, who served in the Alabama State Senate, arranged for the state legislature to pass a special law giving King his freedom and exempting him from the manumission law. In 1852, King used his freedom to purchase land near his former master. When Godwin died in 1859, King erected a monument over his grave.

In 1849, the Alabama State Capitol burned, and King was hired to construct the framework of the new capitol building, as well as design and build the twin spiral entry staircases. King used his knowledge of bridge-building to cantilever the stairs' support beams so that the staircases appeared to "float" without any central support.

Around 1855, King formed a partnership with two other men to construct a bridge, known as Moore's Bridge, over the Chattahoochee between Newnan and Carrollton, Georgia, near Whitesburg. Instead of collecting a fee for his work, King took equity, gaining a one-third interest in the bridge. King moved his wife and children to the area near the bridge about 1858, although he continued to commute between it and their other home in Alabama. Frances King and their children collected bridge tolls and farmed at Moore's Bridge. The earnings from Moore's Bridge generated a steady income for King and his family. He also continued to design and construct major bridge projects through the remainder of the 1850s, including a major bridge in Milledgeville, Georgia, and a second Chattahoochee crossing at Columbus, Georgia.

== As enslaver ==
It is believed that King purchased an enslaved person named J. Sella Martin in the 1850s. When King attempted to subdue Martin by flogging him, he was disappointed by Martin's resistance. King quickly sold him to a slave trader; Martin would escape slavery in 1856 and became well-known as an abolitionist orator.

== American Civil War ==
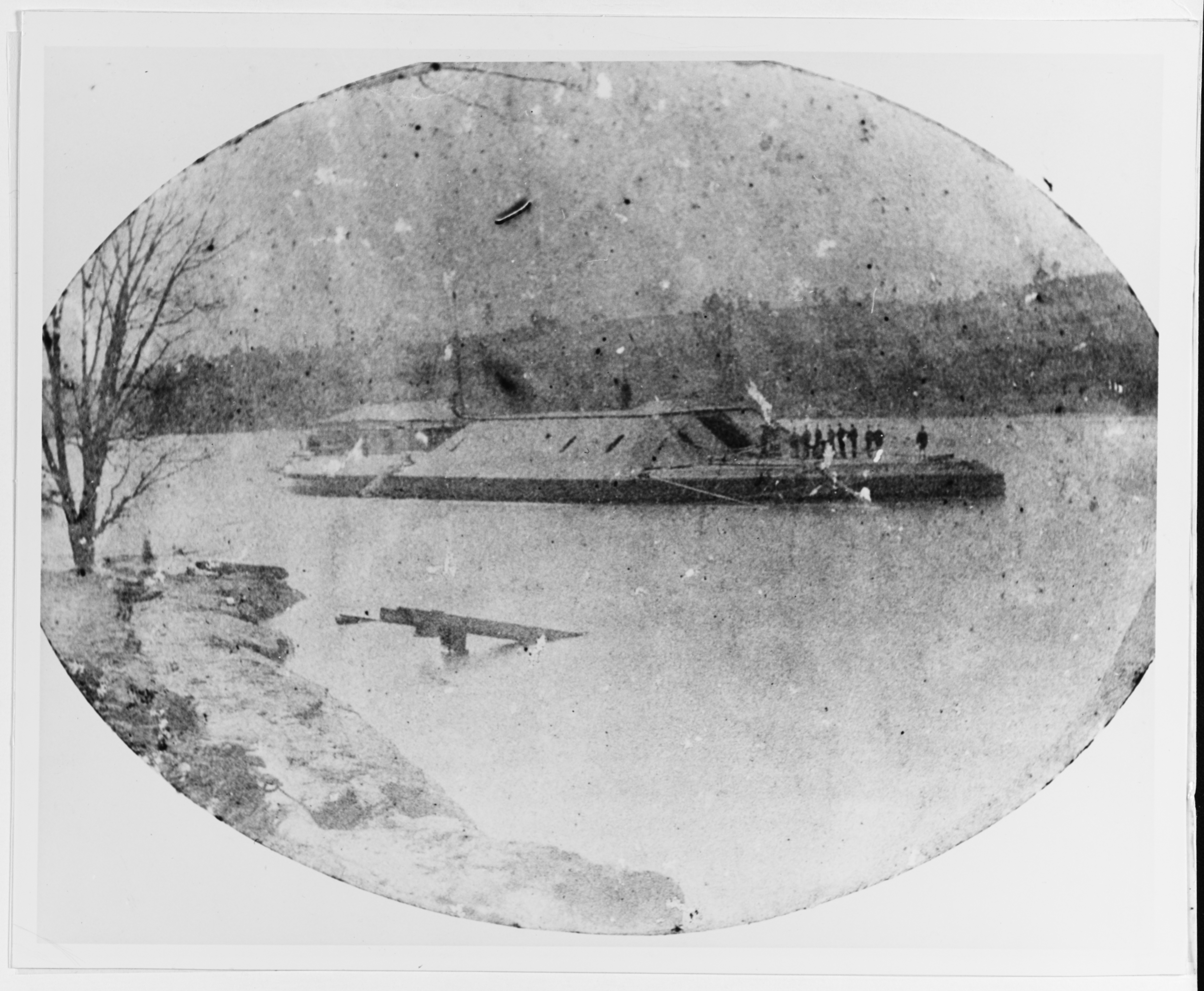
King was conscripted to assist in the construction of Confederate ironclads, including this ship, the CSS Muscogee.

After the outbreak of hostilities, King attempted to continue his business as an architect and builder, constructing a factory and a mill in Coweta County, Georgia, and a bridge in Columbus, Georgia. While working on the Columbus bridge, Confederate authorities conscripted King to build obstructions in the Apalachicola River, 200 miles (320 km) south of Columbus to prevent a naval attack on the city. After completing the obstructions on the Apalachicola, Confederates tasked King to construct defenses on the Alabama River before returning to Columbus in 1863.

By this time, Columbus had become a major shipbuilding city for the Confederacy. King and his men were assigned to assist in constructing vessels at the Columbus Iron Works and Navy Yard. In 1863–64, King constructed a rolling mill for the Iron Works, which manufactured cladding for Confederate ironclad warships. King's crews also provided lumber and timbers for the Navy Yard. They were at least peripherally involved with the construction of the CSS Muscogee. During 1864, King wrote to Jemison, who had also opposed secession but was then serving in the Confederate Senate. King asked what would happen if he stopped working for the Confederacy. Jemison's response is unknown.

As the war approached its end in 1864, U.S. soldiers destroyed many of King's bridges. In July 1864, U.S. Army cavalry destroyed Moore's Bridge, in which King owned an interest. Frances King died at Girard on October 1, 1864, leaving King a widower with five surviving children to care for. Cavalry under U.S. Brig. Gen. James H. Wilson assaulted Columbus in April 1865, burning all of King's bridges in the process, including the one he had finished less than two years earlier. King remarried in June 1865 to Sarah Jane Jones McManus.

== King and Reconstruction ==
King's third rebuilding of the Columbus City Bridge in 1865, six months after U.S. soldiers burned his previous bridge at this location. View of entrance on the Alabama side.

The postwar period presented King with new opportunities. Within six months after the war's end, King and a partner had constructed a 32,000-square-foot (3,000 m^{2}) cotton warehouse in Columbus, and King had—for the third time—rebuilt the original Columbus City Bridge. Over the next three years, King would construct three more bridges across the Chattahoochee: in Columbus, and two at West Point, Georgia, plus two large factories and the Lee County, Alabama, courthouse.

When the Reconstruction Acts were implemented in 1867, King became a registrar for voters in Russell County, Alabama. Later that year, he attempted to establish a colony of freedmen in Georgia. While that plan was unsuccessful, King was elected to the Alabama House of Representatives in 1868 as a Republican representing Russell County. Busy in his construction business in Columbus, King did not take his seat for more than a year, in November 1869. King remained a reluctant legislator, voting 78% of the time and proposing only three bills—none of which became law. King was reelected in 1870, proposing no bills in the 1870-71 session and only five in the 1871-72 session, one of which—a prohibition on the sale of alcohol in Hurtsboro, Alabama—became law. King did not seek reelection in 1872.

== Final years ==
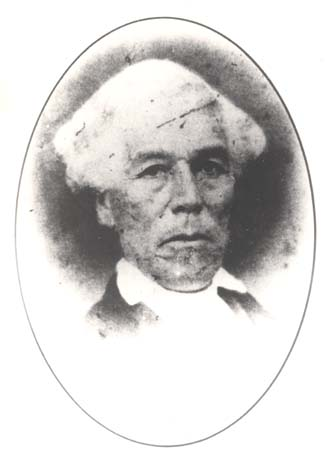
King in his later years

King left the Alabama Legislature in 1872 and moved with his family to LaGrange, Georgia. While in LaGrange, King continued building bridges and expanded to include other construction projects, specifically businesses and schools. By the mid-1870s, King had begun to pass on his bridge construction activities to his five children, who formed the King Brothers Bridge Company. King's health began failing in the 1880s, and he died on May 28, 1885, in LaGrange.

King received laudatory obituaries in Georgia's major newspapers, a rarity for Black Americans in former slavery states. He was posthumously inducted into the Alabama Engineers Hall of Fame at the University of Alabama. The award was accepted on his behalf by his great-grandson, Horace H. King, Jr. He was remembered both for his engineering skill and his character.

== Works ==
- Columbus, Georgia Bridge (destroyed by a flood in 1841) (1832–33)
- Forty cotton warehouses in Apalachicola, Florida (1834)
- West Point, Georgia Bridge (1838)
- Eufaula, Alabama Bridge (demolished in 1924) (1838–39)
- Florence, Georgia Bridge (1840)
- Replacement Columbus, Georgia Bridge (1841)
- Muscogee County Courthouse (1839–41)
- Russell County Courthouse (1839–41)
- Red Oak Creek Covered Bridge, Georgia, listed on the National Register of Historic Places, and the last remaining covered bridge designed by King (1840s)
- Second Columbus, Mississippi Bridge (burned during American Civil War) (1843)
- Wetumpka, Alabama Bridge (1844)
- Tallassee, Alabama Bridge (1845)
- 3 minor bridges near Steens, Mississippi (1845)
- Interior framework and spiral staircases of the Alabama State Capitol in Montgomery, Alabama, listed on the National Register of Historic Places and as a National Historic Landmark (1850–51)
- Moore's Bridge near Whitesburg, Georgia (burned during Civil War) (1855)
- Milledgeville, Georgia Bridge (1850s)
- The Bridge House (Albany, Georgia) in Albany, Georgia, listed on the National Register of Historic Places, now being used as the Albany Welcome Center (1858)
- Third Columbus, Mississippi Bridge (demolished in 20th century) (1865)
- City Mills Hotel original building in Columbus, Georgia (1869)
- Tuscaloosa, Alabama Bridge over the Black Warrior River (destroyed by tornado in 1880) (1872)
- Wehadkee Creek Bridge, Troup County, Georgia (1973). Destroyed by flood. Rebuilt by son, George (1890). Moved 60' to Callaway Gardens in Pine Mountain, Ga., in 1960s. In 2022, moved to LaGrange, Troup County, Georgia, and placed adjacent to Horace King's gravesite within Mulberry Street Cemetery Opened to public July 24, 2025.

== See also ==
- Okosse (F.J. Cherry) (1883). "V. Horace King—John Godwin—Joe Marshall—Bridge Building—Horace King Emancipated—His Political Life—Honors Old Masters Grave—Crockettsville". The History of Opelika and Her Agricultural Tributary Territory. Reprinted in Cherry, F. J. (1953). "The History of Opelika and Her Agricultural Tributary Territory". The Alabama Historical Quarterly. 15 (2): 176–339. In particular pages 193-197 (chapter V). Page numbers in references are from the 1953 reprinting.
- Dameron, J. David (February 23, 2017). Horace King: From Slave, to Master Builder and Legislator. Southeast Research Publishing (self-published). ISBN 978-1-5206-6302-9.
- Lupold, John S.; French, Thomas L. (2004). Bridging deep south rivers: the life and legend of Horace King. Athens, Georgia: University of Georgia Press. ISBN 978-0-8203-2626-9.
- HORACE: The Bridge Builder King (Documentary), Produced by Tom C. Lenard. Part I on YouTube Part II on YouTube Part III on YouTube Part IV on YouTube Part V on YouTube Part VI on YouTube.
