= Poole's Mill Covered Bridge =

Historic covered bridge in Georgia, US

- U.S. National Register of Historic Places
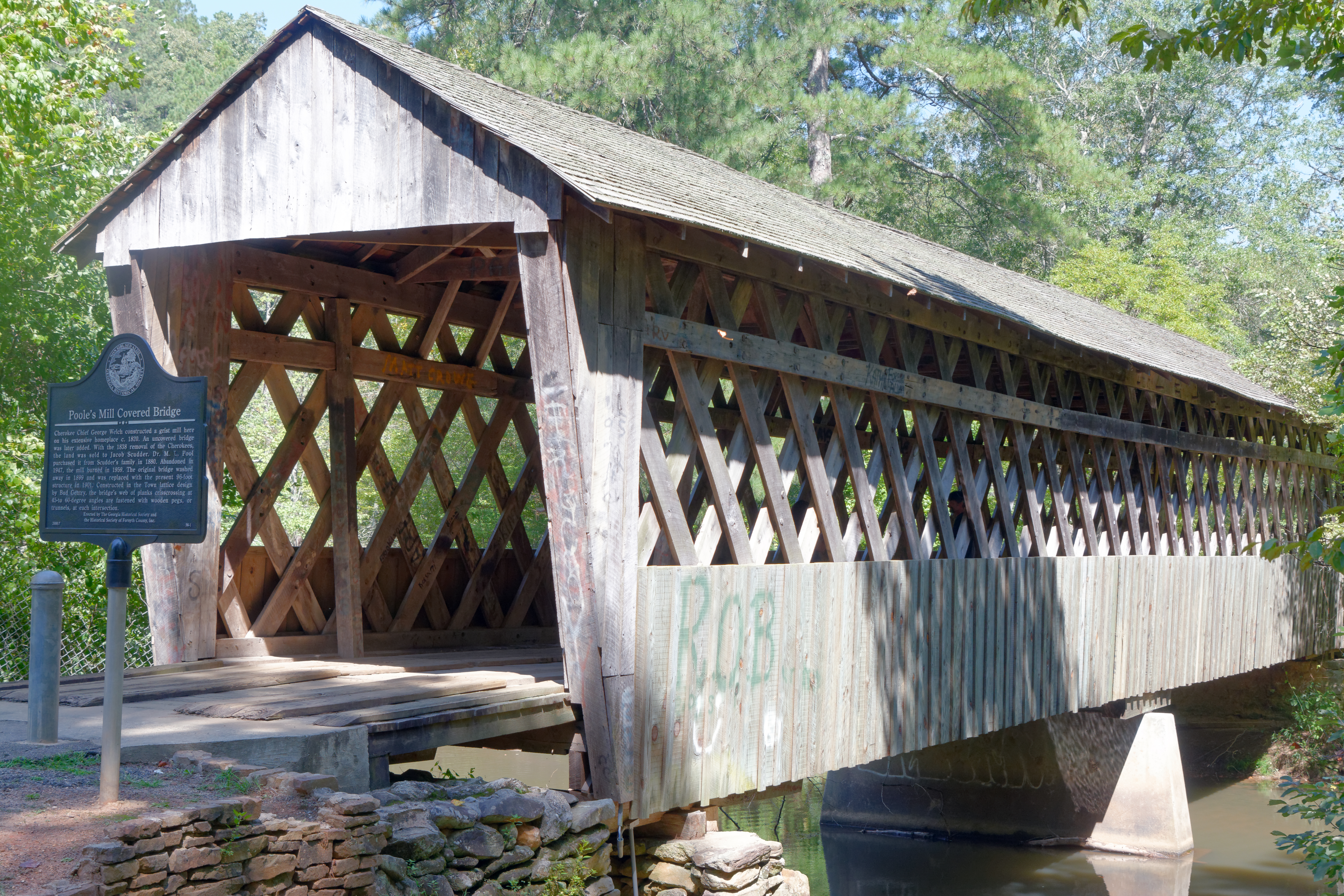

- Location within Georgia Location within the United States
- Nearest city: Cumming, Georgia
- Coordinates: 34.29093°N 84.24255°W
- Built: 1900
- Architect: John Wofford, Bud Gentry
- NRHP reference No.: 75000593
- Added to NRHP: April 1, 1975

Poole's Mill Bridge is a historic wooden covered bridge crossing over Settingdown Creek (tributary of the Etowah River) in Forsyth County, Georgia, United States, built in 1901. It is 96 feet long.

== History ==
Circa 1820, Cherokee Chief George Welch constructed a gristmill, a sawmill, and a simple open bridge at the site. Welch continued to run and maintain the mills and bridge until the Cherokee removal in 1838.

The land that held the bridge and mills was won in the land lottery by John Maynard of Jackson County, Georgia, who sold the land to Jacob Scudder. Following Scudder's death in 1870 the mill and bridge were bought by Dr. M.L. Pool. A cotton gin was added at the site in 1920, but cotton was largely abandoned by local farmers when the poultry farming was introduced. The mill was left in disuse by 1947 and was burned by vandals in 1959.

The original bridge that stood at the site was washed away in a flood in 1899. It was decided that a new bridge using the Lattice truss bridge style would be built on the site. The design called for wooden pegs to be driven into holes bored into wooden beams to hold the design together. The beams were cut on site at the saw mill, but the holes were bored in the wrong positions. At this point the construction was taken over by Bud Gentry, who oversaw the redrilling of the holes. The misdrilled holes can still be seen in the bridge's beams.

In the mid-1990s the bridge began to sag and a revitalization effort began. A support pier was built in the middle of the creek. During this revitalization private citizens also donated land in the area to allow the creation of Poole's Mill Park.

== Gallery ==
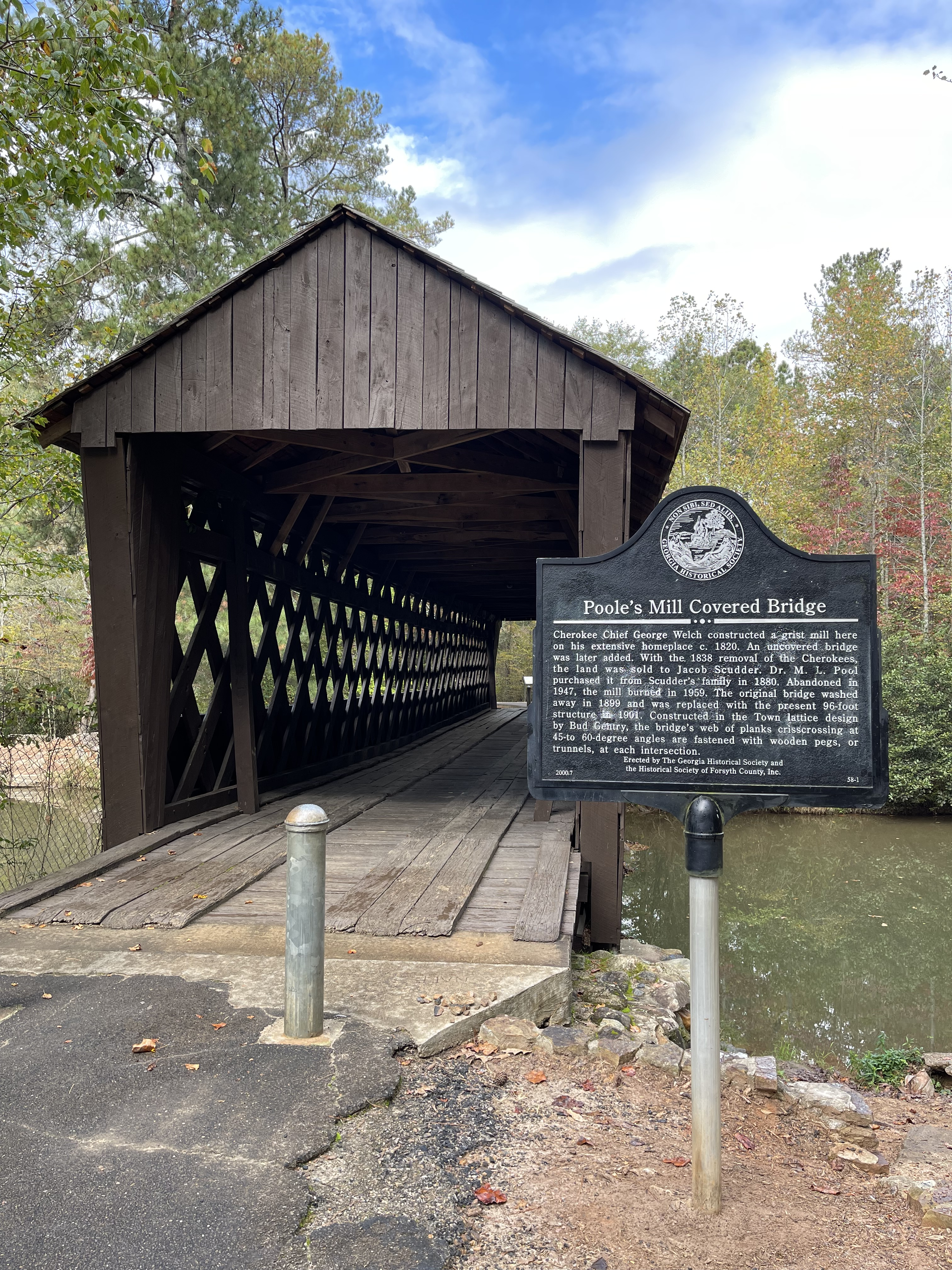

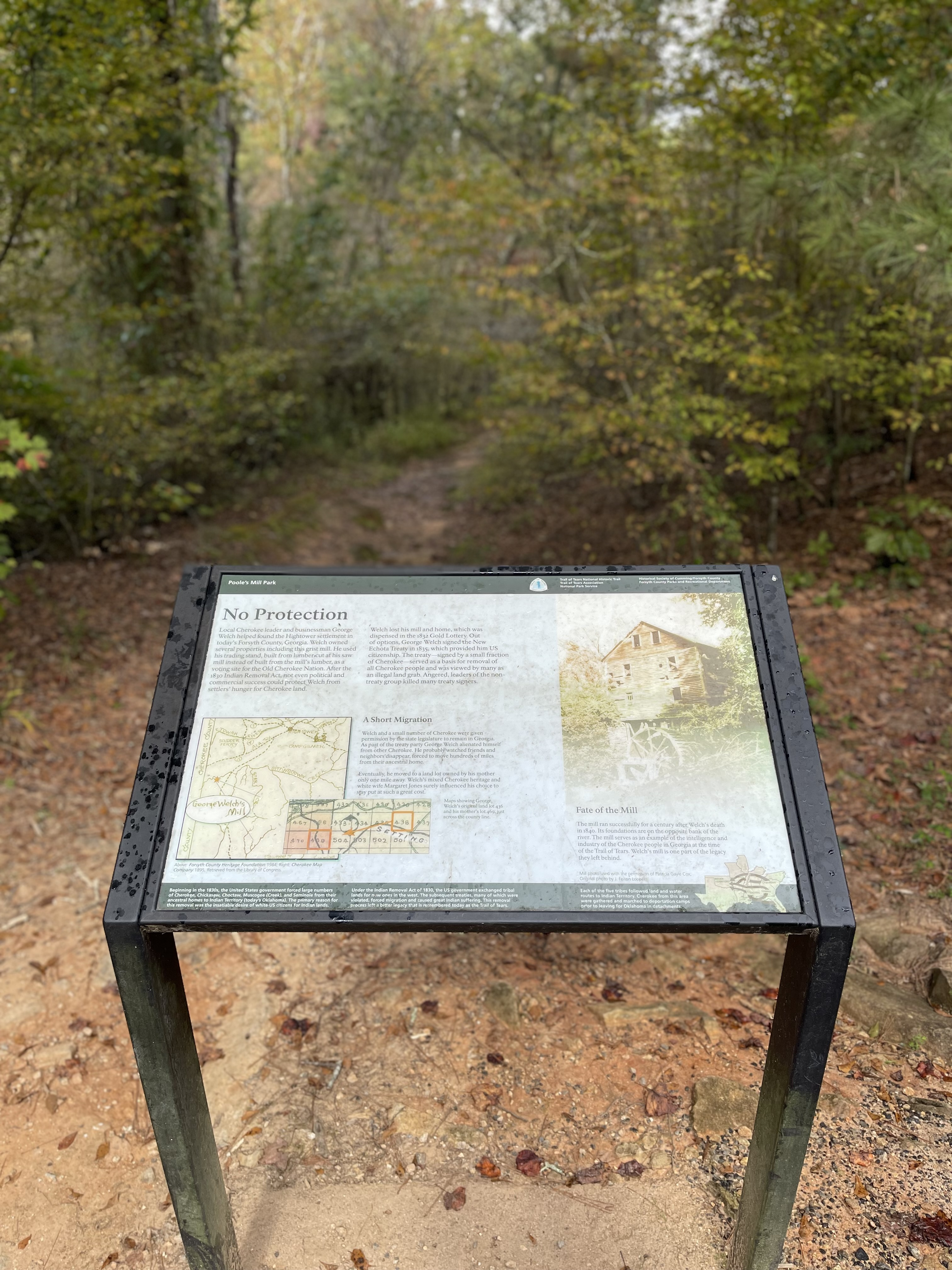

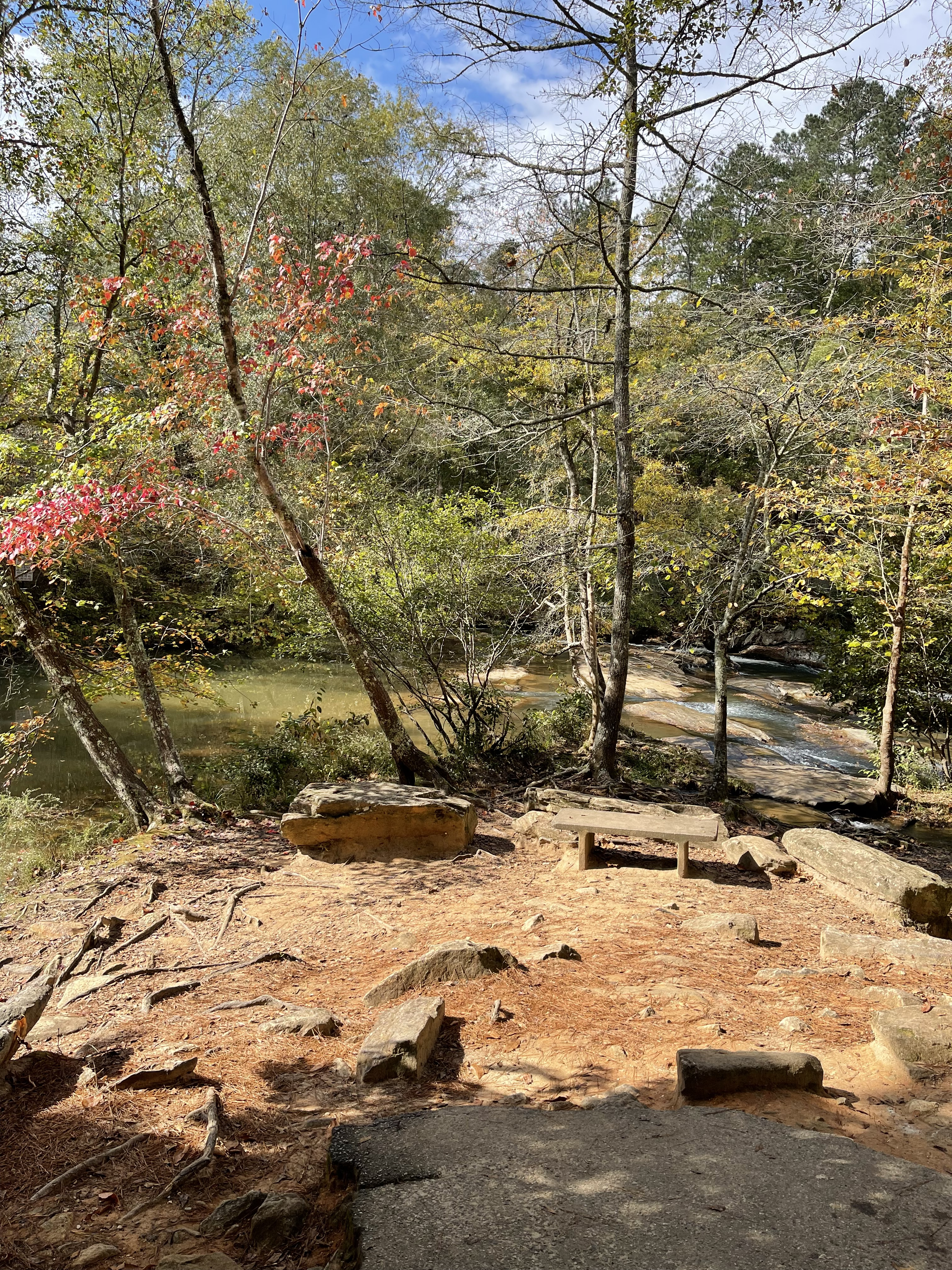

== See also ==
- List of covered bridges in Georgia
