= Ruff's Mill and Concord Covered Bridge =

- U.S. National Register of Historic Places
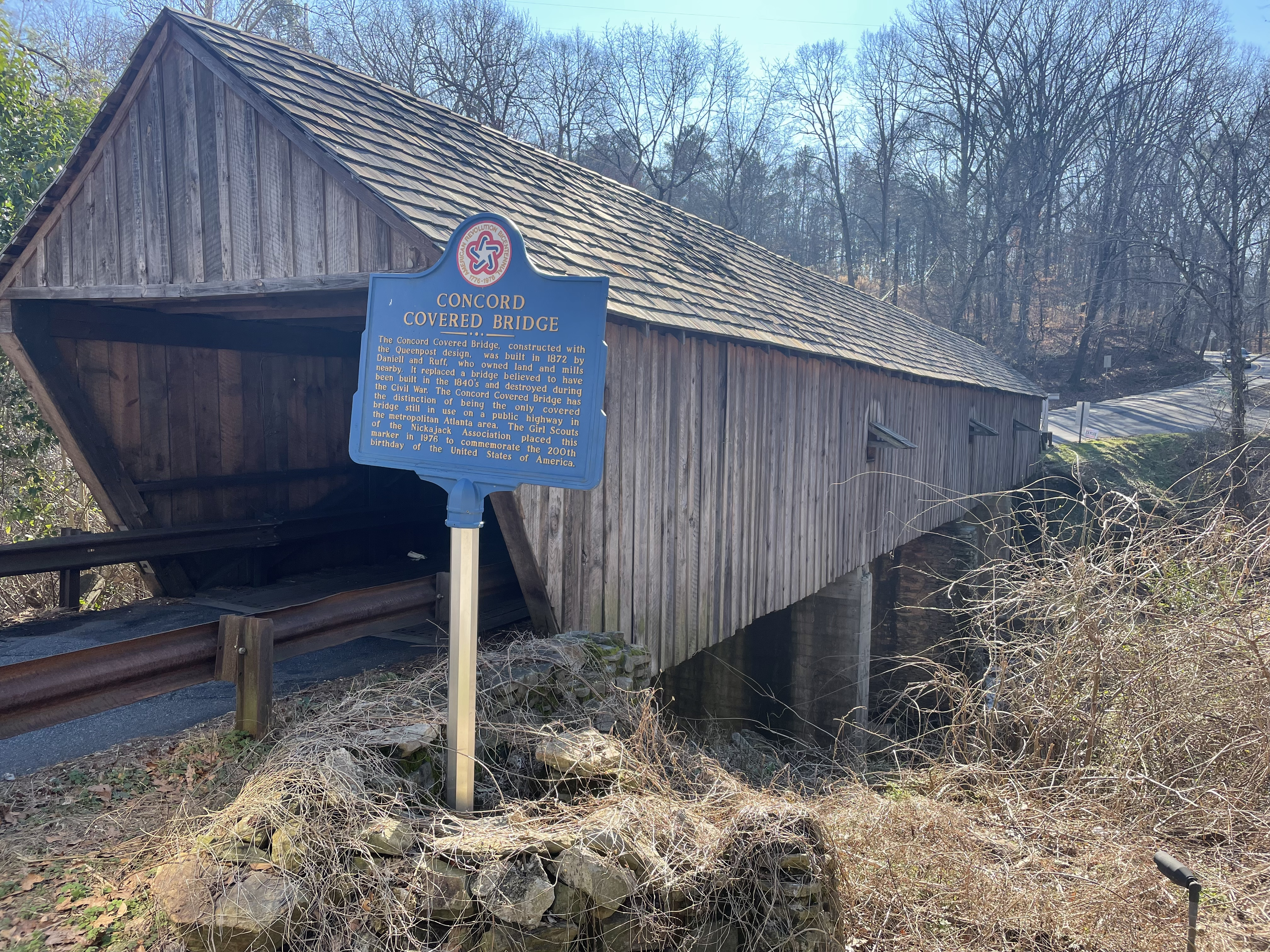

- Location within Georgia Location within the United States
- Location: 10 Concord Rd., SW, Smyrna, Georgia address
- Coordinates: 33°50′56″N 84°33′30″W
- Area: 3.5 acres (1.4 ha)
- Built: c.1864
- Architect: Ruff, Martin L., Jr.; Daniell, Robert
- Architectural style: Plantation Plain
- NRHP reference No.: 80001001
- Added to NRHP: November 24, 1980

Ruff's Mill and Concord Covered Bridge is a historical site in Cobb County, Georgia. It was listed on the National Register of Historic Places in 1980.

The site includes a gristmill building, the Miller's house, and a covered bridge.

Ruffʼs Mill (1840s) and the Millerʼs House (c. 1850), along with Concord Covered Bridge, exemplify the small, rural water-powered mill complexes that were common in Georgia and the South in the mid-to-late-19th century.

Located on former Cherokee land, the land lots comprising this complex were won in the Georgia Gold and Land Lottery of 1832. Martin L. Ruff, prominent pioneer settler of Cobb County, and his descendants operated the wheat-and-corn grist mill through most of the century. During the Civil War on July 4, 1864, the fierce Battle at Ruffʼs Mill, where the Union routed the Confederates, was one of the few Confederate earthworks successfully charged and overrun during the Atlanta Campaign. Although the grist millʼs fieldstone facade was pockmarked with bullets, still visible today, the dwelling was spared from torching when it was designated to serve as a field hospital for the many wounded combatants.

The Millerʼs House was constructed in a simple architectural style featuring a distinctive tall, narrow profile that is identified by preservationists as Plantation Plain. The home has been adapted over the years to the needs and changing tastes of its occupants, but the exterior today remains largely faithful to its original appearance. The terraced grounds were designed in the 1930s by the celebrated William C. Pauley, creator of Hurt Park —Atlantaʼs first professionally trained landscape architect.

One-lane Concord Covered Bridge, spanning Nickajack Creek, has undergone numerous iterations since its initial construction in 1872. During a century and a half in continuous use, this landmark bridge has been rebuilt, repaired and strengthened to accommodate modern automobile traffic.

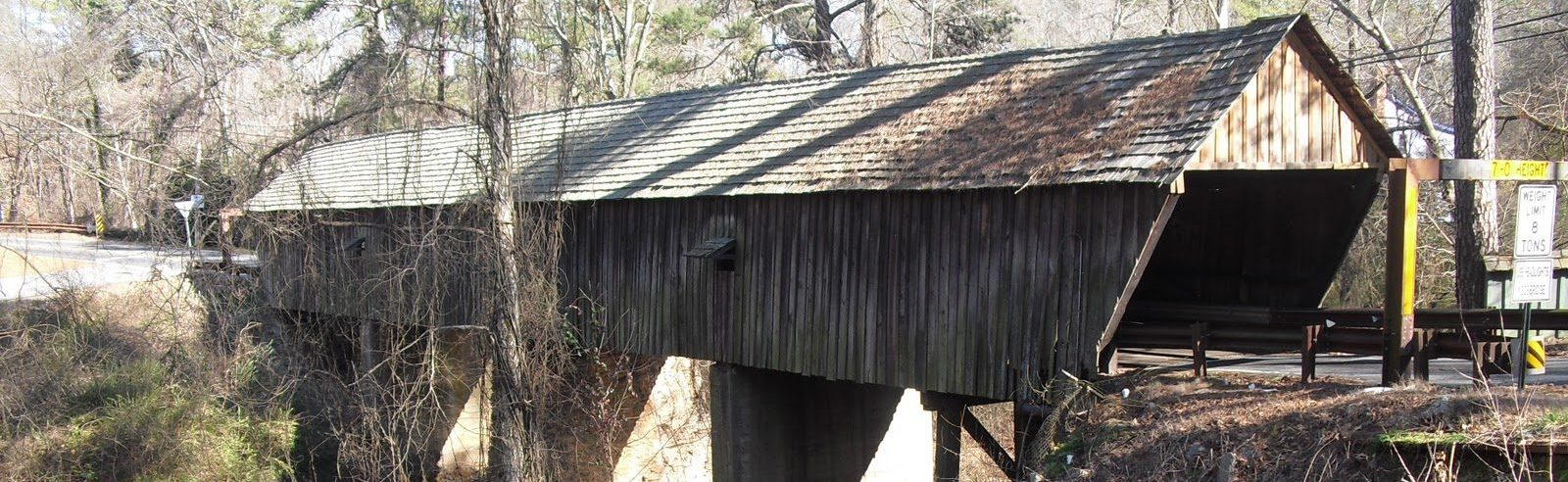
The Concord Covered Bridge spanning Nickajack Creek

This covered bridge on Concord Road is the only one remaining in Cobb County and one of only 16 left in Georgia. The bridge measures 133 feet long, 16 feet wide, and 13 feet high, with a low seven-foot entry clearance that has in recent years resulted in collisions by drivers of oversized vehicles.

Two successive bridges were erected at the same location on land owned by Martin L. Ruff Sr., a prominent early settler in this district of Cobb County, whose family members operated the adjacent grist mill. Ruffʼs neighbors, Robert Daniell of the Concord Woolen Mill and State Senator John Gann, joined with him in 1848 to build a flat-decked bridge span over stone-masonry supports, that appear to have been retained during construction of the covered bridge 24 years later.

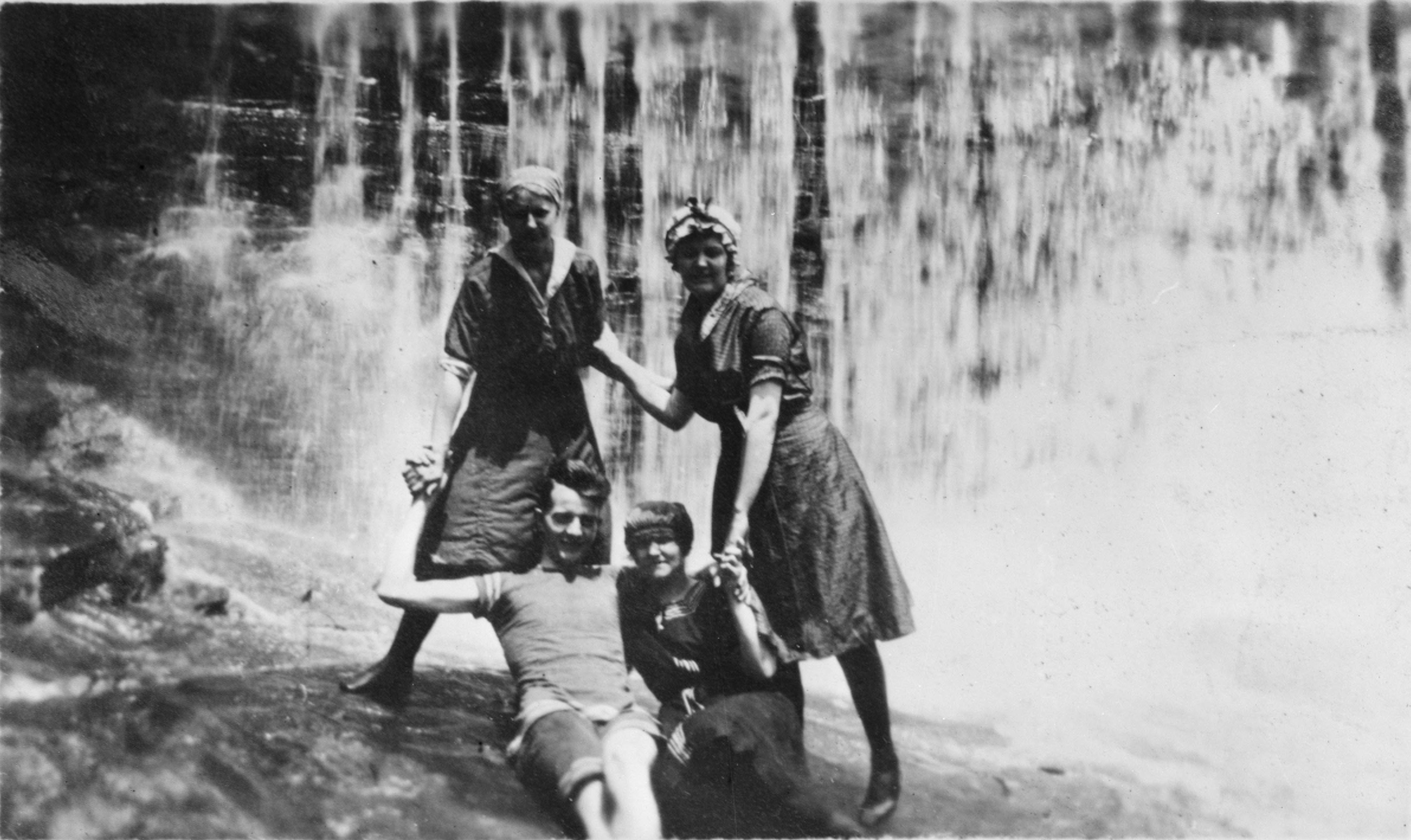
Swimmers in Nickajack Creek, 1916

Although significantly enhanced structurally over the decades, Concord Covered Bridge looks today much as it did in the 19th century —with a heavy wood-planked floor, sides of vertical board and batten, and a cedar shake roof.

The remnants of Nickajack Dam are visible upstream of the bridge. This dam provided water power via a sluice that ran under Concord Road to the Grist Mill. With a drop of over 20 feet from the top of the dam to the mill due to the hairpin gorge of Nickajack Creek, the Grist Mill had a strong power source with a very short distance for the water to travel.

== See also ==
- List of covered bridges in Georgia
