= Coheelee Creek Covered Bridge =

- U.S. National Register of Historic Places
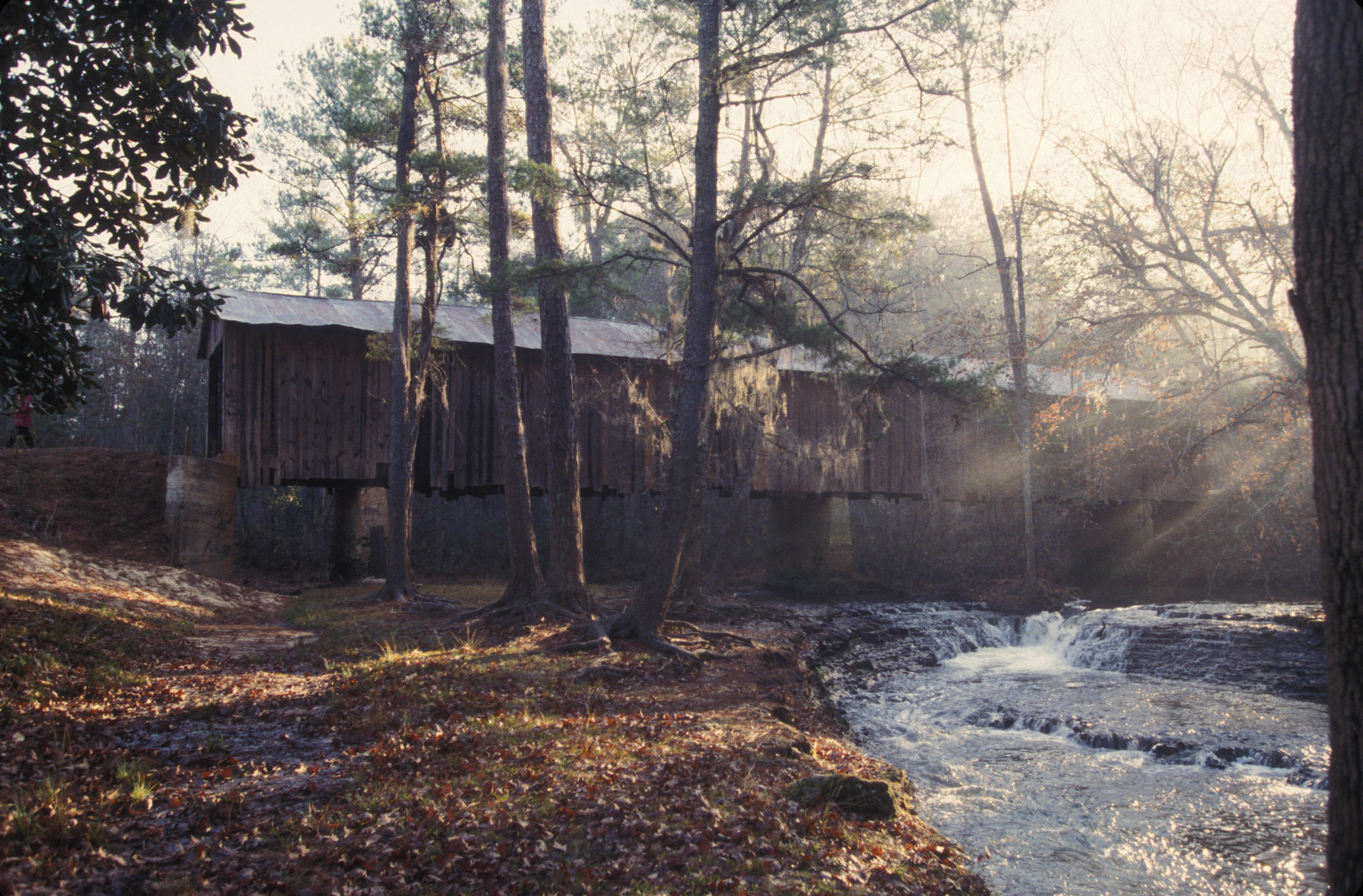

- Location within Georgia
- Nearest city: Hilton, Georgia
- Coordinates: 31°18′23″N 85°04′43″W
- Area: less than one acre
- Built: 1891
- Built by: J.W. Baughman
- Architectural style: Modified Queen Post Truss
- NRHP reference No.: 76000617
- Added to NRHP: May 13, 1976

The Coheelee Creek Covered Bridge near Hilton, Georgia is a covered bridge which was built in 1891. It was listed on the National Register of Historic Places in 1976.

It was built by J.W. Baughman. It has two 54 feet (16 m) spans and rests upon three abutments.

It is located two miles (3.2 km) north of Hilton on Old River Rd.

== See also ==
- List of covered bridges in Georgia
