= Elder's Mill Covered Bridge and Elder Mill =

- U.S. National Register of Historic Places
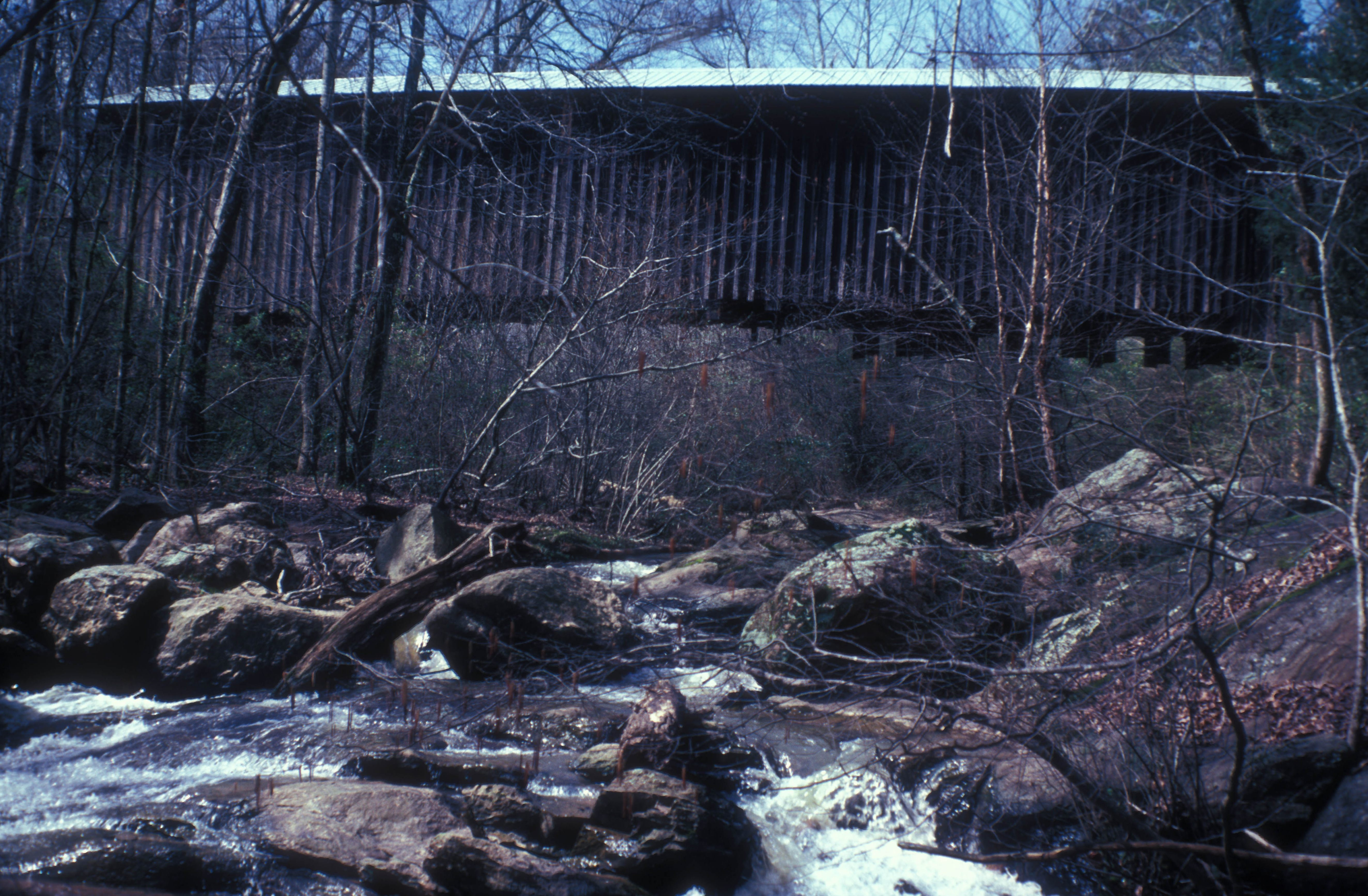

- Location within Georgia
- Nearest city: Watkinsville, Georgia
- Coordinates: 33°48′11″N 83°21′49″W
- Area: 6 acres (2.4 ha)
- Built: 1897
- Built by: Richardson, Nathaniel; Hunt and Durham
- NRHP reference No.: 94000389
- Added to NRHP: May 5, 1994

Elder's Mill Covered Bridge and Elder Mill is a covered bridge near Watkinsville, Georgia, and was listed on the National Register of Historic Places in 1994.

It is located on Elder Mill Rd., 4/5 mi. south of its junction with GA 15. The listing includes the covered bridge built in 1897 and a c.1900 three-story wood-frame mill building. The bridge was built in 1897 by Nathaniel Richardson to bring the Watkinsville-Athens Road across Call Creek in Clarke County, and was moved in 1924 to its current location spanning Rose Creek in Oconee County. The bridge is a 99 feet (30 m) long Town lattice truss covered bridge.

== See also ==
- List of covered bridges in Georgia
