= Cromer's Mill Covered Bridge =

- U.S. National Register of Historic Places
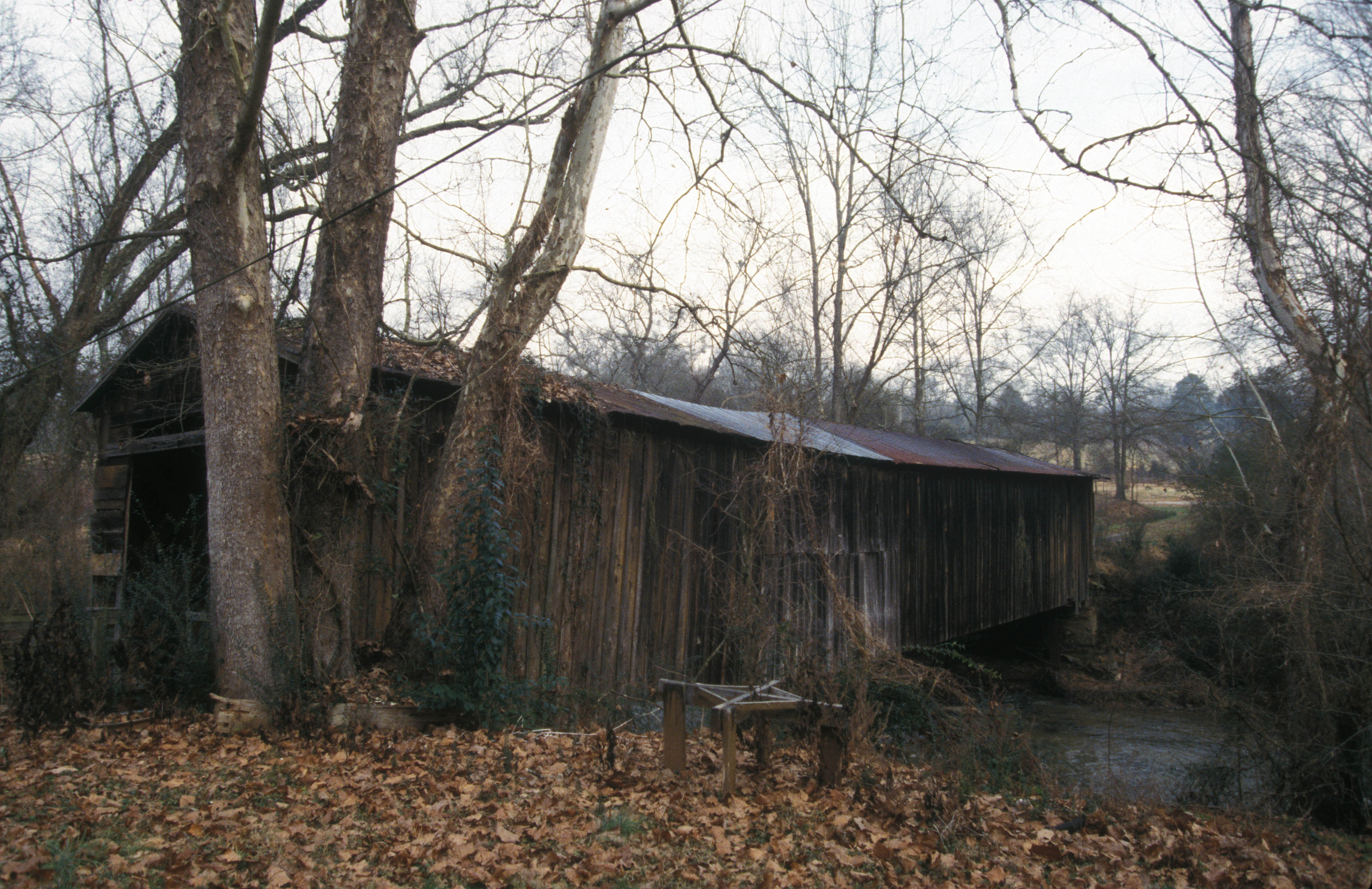

- Location within Georgia
- Nearest city: Carnesville, Georgia
- Coordinates: 34°16′29″N 83°15′57″W
- Area: 5 acres (2.0 ha)
- Built: 1907
- Built by: Hunt, James M.
- Architectural style: Town Lattice
- NRHP reference No.: 76000619
- Added to NRHP: August 17, 1976

The Cromer's Mill Covered Bridge, spanning Nails Creek near Carnesville, Georgia, was built in 1907. It was listed on the National Register of Historic Places in 1976.

It is a Town Lattice truss bridge. It has also been known as Nails Creek Covered Bridge.

It is located 8 miles (13 km) south of Carnesville at Nails Creek.

The bridge rests on stone abutments at its ends and a central pier. A steel truss made of 12-inch steel I-beams was added under the north end of the bridge. And later a single wooden pole was installed to support one side of the bridge.

== See also ==
- List of covered bridges in Georgia
