= Auchumpkee Creek =

Stream in Georgia, U.S.

Coordinates: 32°41′08″N 84°11′50″W

Auchumpkee Creek is a stream in the U.S. state of Georgia. It is a tributary to the Flint River.

"Auchumpkee" is a name derived from the Muskogean language meaning "hickory nuts all over". A variant name is "Oak Chunk Creek".
