= Washington W. King Bridge =

Bridge in DeKalb County, Georgia, USA

- U.S. National Register of Historic Places
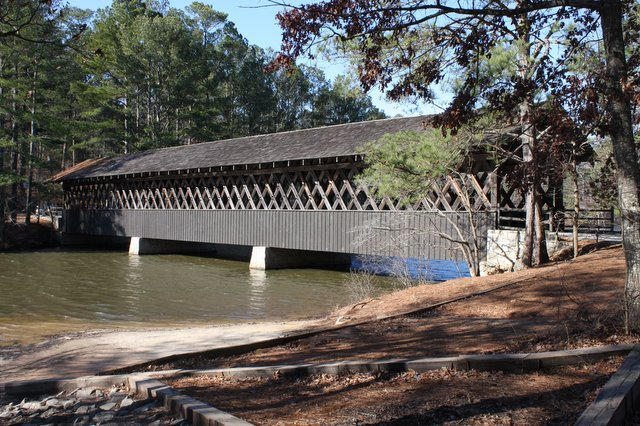

- Location within Georgia
- Nearest city: Stone Mountain, Georgia
- Coordinates: 33°48′13.0″N 84°7′59.6″W
- Area: less than one acre
- Built: 1891
- Built by: Washington W. King
- Architectural style: Town lattice
- NRHP reference No.: 100007520
- Added to NRHP: March 22, 2022

The Washington W. King Bridge, also known as Stone Mountain Covered Bridge and College Avenue Bridge, is a covered bridge in Stone Mountain Park in DeKalb County, Georgia. It was listed on the National Register of Historic Places in 2022.

== History ==
The Washington W. King Bridge was originally built in 1891 for $2,470 in Athens, Georgia to connect College Street and downtown Athens with outlying farm lands across the Oconee River. Two severe floods in 1910 and 1963 damaged the bridge severely. In 1963, the Stone Mountain Memorial Association expressed interest in relocating the bridge to Stone Mountain Park. The bridge was donated to the SMMA for $1 and in 1965, the bridge was dismantled and traveled 60 miles from Athens to Stone Mountain. The bridge was reassembled atop new cement and granite piers connecting the park to a picturesque island across Stone Mountain Lake.

In 2019, the SMMA voted to name this bridge the Washington W. King Bridge after Washington W. King, who constructed the bridge.

== See also ==
- List of covered bridges in Georgia
