= Stovall Mill Covered Bridge =

United States historic place

Coordinates: 34°42′41.37″N 83°39′26.99″W

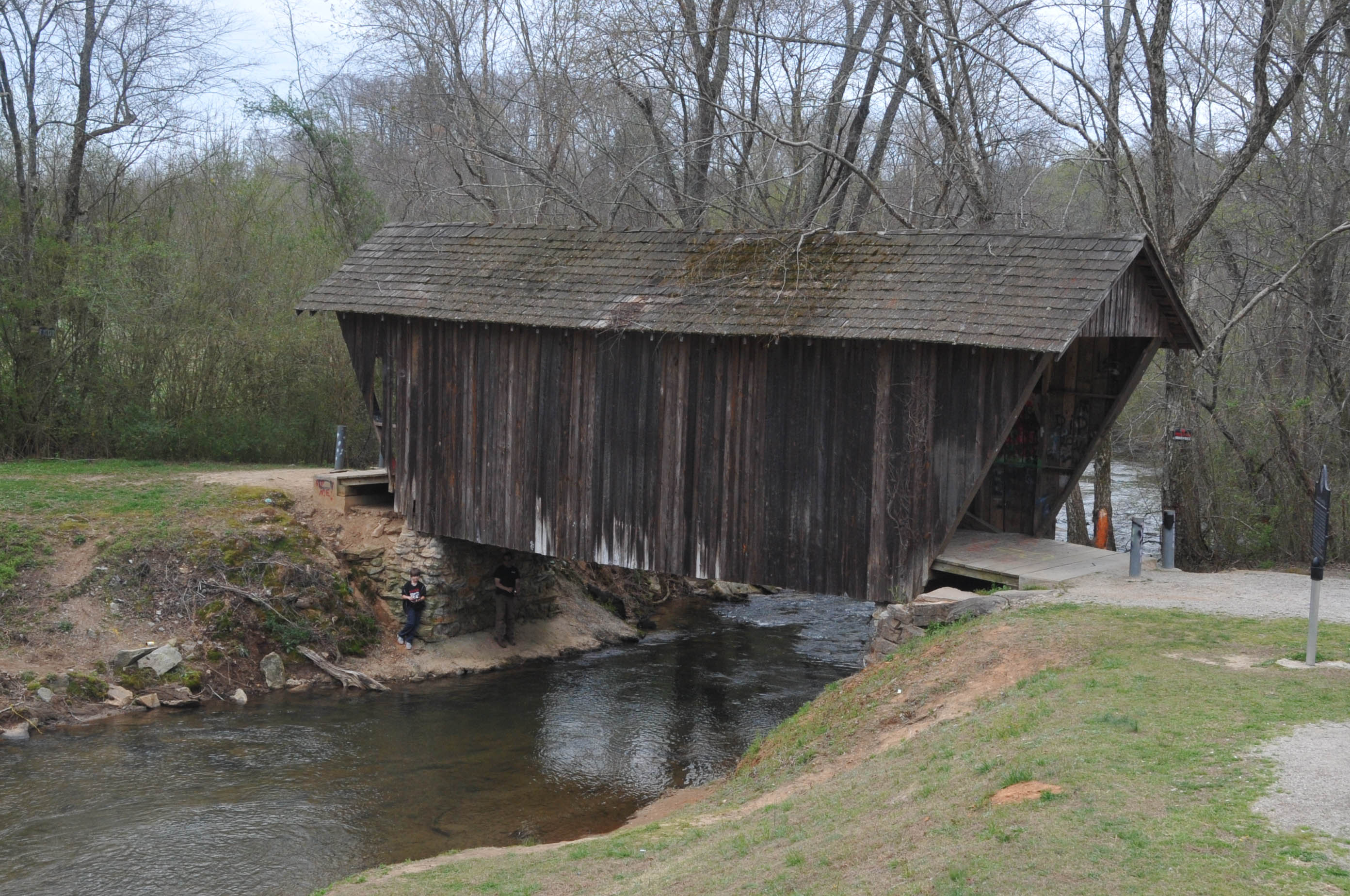

The Stovall Mill Covered Bridge is the smallest covered bridge in Georgia. Built in 1895, it is one-lane wide, 33 feet long, and made of wood. It spans Chickamauga Creek in White County and is located near State Route 255.

The bridge is currently owned by the White County Historical Society. In the past, it served as a link on the Cleveland to Clayton road; but by 1959, the road was moved away from the bridge. The Stovall Mill Covered Bridge has a variety of other names including the Helen Bridge (for the town of Helen), The Covered Bridge (to locals) Chickamauga Bridge, Nacoochee Bridge, and Sautee Bridge.

== In popular culture ==
- The Stovall Mill Covered Bridge was featured in the 1951 movie "I'd Climb The Highest Mountain," starring Rory Calhoun, William Lundigan, and Susan Hayward.
- The bridge is a local landmark and open to the public.

== See also ==
- List of covered bridges in Georgia
