= Kesler Covered Bridge =

- U.S. National Register of Historic Places
- Location within Georgia
- Nearest city: Homer, Georgia
- Coordinates: 34°25′27″N 83°23′16″W
- Area: less than one acre
- Built: 1925
- Architect: Verner, Robert; Multiple
- Architectural style: Kingpost & queenpost truss
- NRHP reference No.: 75000571
- Added to NRHP: June 18, 1975

The Kesler Covered Bridge, near Homer, Georgia, was built in 1925. It was listed on the National Register of Historic Places in 1975.

It is located 10 miles (16 km) north of Homer on County Line Rd. over the Middle Fork of the Broad River.

It is a single-span 69 feet (21 m) long truss bridge.

It is unusual for having a Kingpost truss on one side and a Queenpost truss on the other.

It was a work of construction foreman Robert Verner and workers Eugene Vaughn, J. A. Kesler, Grady Crump and Daye Crump. It is named for the Kesler family.

The bridge is completely gone. Covered bridge historians and the Georgia Department of Transportation document that it was lost during the winter of 1978–1981, succumbing to collapse from severe weather and deterioration.
