= New Salem Covered Bridge =

- U.S. National Register of Historic Places
- Location within Georgia
- Nearest city: Commerce, Georgia
- Coordinates: 34°15′30″N 83°25′20″W
- Area: less than one acre
- Built: 1915
- Built by: Thomas, W.M.
- Architectural style: Multiple kingpost truss
- NRHP reference No.: 75000570
- Added to NRHP: June 10, 1975

The New Salem Covered Bridge, near Commerce, Georgia, was a multiple kingpost truss covered bridge built in 1915. It was listed on the National Register of Historic Places in 1975.

It spanned a branch of Grove Creek, and was located 6 miles (9.7 km) north of Commerce on SR S992. By 1974 it had been bypassed by a modern concrete bridge, so it was no longer used. It was a 47 feet (14 m) long single span bridge and collapsed in 1984.
