= Alvaton, Georgia =

Unincorporated community in Georgia, U.S.

Coordinates: 33°10′15″N 84°34′50″W

Alvaton is an unincorporated community in Meriwether County, in the U.S. state of Georgia.

== History ==
Alvaton had its start when the Atlanta, Birmingham and Atlantic Railroad was extended to that point. A post office was established at Alvaton in 1908. The community was named after one Alva McCrary. The Georgia General Assembly incorporated Alvaton as a town in 1911. The town was officially dissolved in 1995.
