= Butkus Award =

College football award

- Awarded for: Given to the best linebackers at the high school, collegiate and professional levels of football
- Country: United States
- Presented by: Downtown Athletic Club of Orlando (1985–2007); Butkus Foundation (2008–present)

History
- First award: 1985
- Most recent: College: Jacob Rodriguez; Pro: Jack Campbell; High School: Tyler Atkinson
- Website: http://www.thebutkusaward.com/

The Butkus Award, instituted in 1985 by the Downtown Athletic Club of Orlando, is given annually to the top linebackers at the high school, collegiate and professional levels of football. The award, named in honor of College Football Hall of Fame and Pro Football Hall of Fame linebacker Dick Butkus, is presented by the Butkus Foundation, a non-profit organization that supports a number of health and wellness activities including the "I Play Clean" anti-steroid program. The award was first established by the Downtown Athletic Club of Orlando, which relinquished control of the award in 2008 following a lawsuit by Butkus.

Traditionally, the award was given only to the top collegiate linebacker. The Butkus Award was expanded in 2008 to include high school and professional winners as part of a makeover by the Butkus family to help end anabolic steroid abuse among young athletes. Three players have won both the high school and collegiate Butkus Awards: Notre Dame linebackers Manti Te'o (2008, 2012) and Jaylon Smith (2012, 2015) and also Georgia linebacker Nakobe Dean (2018, 2021). Five players have won both the collegiate and professional Butkus Awards: San Francisco 49ers linebacker Patrick Willis (2006, 2009), Denver Broncos linebacker Von Miller (2010, 2012), Carolina Panthers linebacker Luke Kuechly (2011, 2014, 2015, 2017), Baltimore Ravens linebacker Roquan Smith (2017, 2022, 2023), and Detroit Lions linebacker Jack Campbell (2022, 2025).

== Recipients ==
=== Collegiate winners ===
Year	Player	School	Ref.
1985	Brian Bosworth	Oklahoma	
1986	Brian Bosworth (2)	Oklahoma (2)	
1987	Paul McGowan	Florida State	
1988	Derrick Thomas	Alabama	
1989	Percy Snow	Michigan State	
1990	Alfred Williams	Colorado	
1991	Erick Anderson	Michigan	
1992	Marvin Jones	Florida State (2)	
1993	Trev Alberts	Nebraska	
1994	Dana Howard	Illinois	
1995	Kevin Hardy	Illinois (2)	
1996	Matt Russell	Colorado (2)	
1997	Andy Katzenmoyer	Ohio State	
1998	Chris Claiborne	USC	
1999	LaVar Arrington	Penn State	
2000	Dan Morgan	Miami (FL)	
2001	Rocky Calmus	Oklahoma (3)	
2002	E. J. Henderson	Maryland	
2003	Teddy Lehman	Oklahoma (4)	
2004	Derrick Johnson	Texas	
2005	Paul Posluszny	Penn State (2)	
2006	Patrick Willis	Ole Miss	
2007	James Laurinaitis	Ohio State (2)	
2008	Aaron Curry	Wake Forest	
2009	Rolando McClain	Alabama (2)	
2010	Von Miller	Texas A&M	
2011	Luke Kuechly	Boston College	
2012	Manti Teʻo	Notre Dame	
2013	C. J. Mosley	Alabama (3)	
2014	Eric Kendricks	UCLA	
2015	Jaylon Smith	Notre Dame (2)	
2016	Reuben Foster	Alabama (4)	
2017	Roquan Smith	Georgia	
2018	Devin White	LSU	
2019	Isaiah Simmons	Clemson	
2020	Jeremiah Owusu-Koramoah	Notre Dame (3)	
2021	Nakobe Dean	Georgia (2)	
2022	Jack Campbell	Iowa	
2023	Payton Wilson	NC State	
2024	Jalon Walker	Georgia (3)	
2025	Jacob Rodriguez	Texas Tech	

=== Professional winners ===
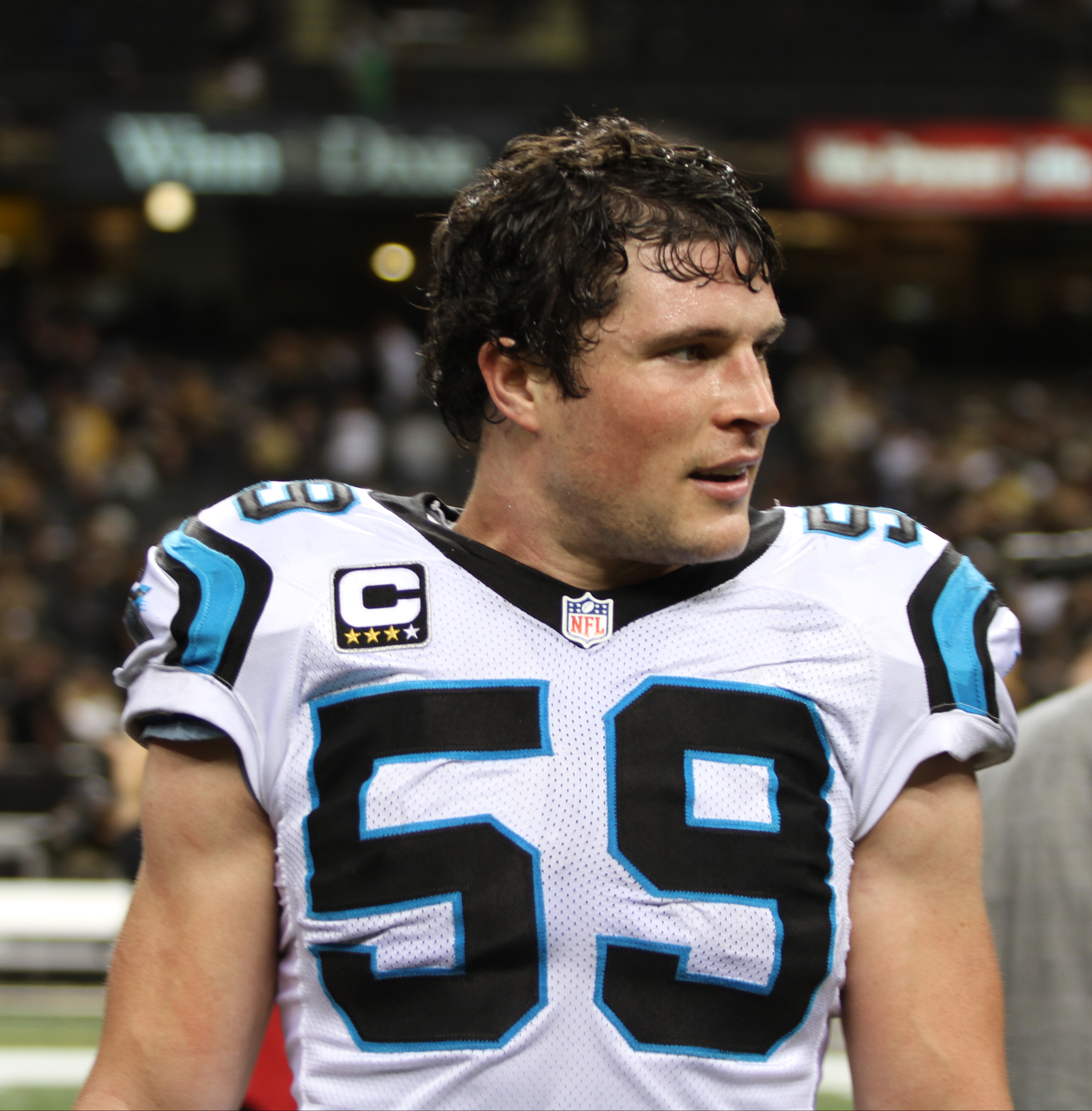
Luke Kuechly holds the record for most wins by a player with four awards (one in college and three in the pros).

Season	Player	Team	Ref.
2008	DeMarcus Ware	Dallas Cowboys	
2009	Patrick Willis	San Francisco 49ers	
2010	Clay Matthews III	Green Bay Packers	
2011	Terrell Suggs	Baltimore Ravens	
2011	DeMarcus Ware (2)	Dallas Cowboys	
2012	Von Miller	Denver Broncos	
2013	NaVorro Bowman	San Francisco 49ers	
2014	Luke Kuechly	Carolina Panthers	
2015	Luke Kuechly (2)	Carolina Panthers	
2016	Khalil Mack	Oakland Raiders	
2017	Luke Kuechly (3)	Carolina Panthers	
2018	Khalil Mack (2)	Chicago Bears	
2019	Chandler Jones	Arizona Cardinals	
2020	T. J. Watt	Pittsburgh Steelers	
2021	Micah Parsons	Dallas Cowboys	
2022	Roquan Smith	Baltimore Ravens	
2023	Roquan Smith (2)	Baltimore Ravens	
2024	Zack Baun	Philadelphia Eagles	
2025	Jack Campbell	Detroit Lions	

=== High school winners ===
Year	Player	School
2008	Manti Teʻo	Punahou (Honolulu, HI)
2009	Jordan Hicks	Lakota West (West Chester, OH)
2010	Tony Steward	Pedro Menendez (St. Augustine, FL)
2011	Noor Davis	Leesburg (Leesburg, FL)
2012	Jaylon Smith	Bishop Luers (Fort Wayne, IN)
2013	Raekwon McMillan	Liberty County (Hinesville, GA)
2014	Malik Jefferson	Ralph H. Poteet (Mesquite, TX)
2015	Caleb Kelly	Clovis West (Fresno, CA)
2016	Dylan Moses	IMG (Bradenton, FL)
2017	Solomon Tuliaupupu	Mater Dei (Santa Ana, CA)
2018	Nakobe Dean	Horn Lake (Horn Lake, MS)
2019	Justin Flowe	Upland (Upland, CA)
2020	Prince Kollie	David Crockett (Jonesborough, TN)
2021	Shawn Murphy	Unity Reed (Manassas, VA)
2022	Drayk Bowen	Andrean (Merrillville, IN)
2023	Sammy Brown	Jefferson (Jefferson, GA)
2024	Christian Jones	Westside (Omaha, NE)
2025	Tyler Atkinson	Grayson (Loganville, GA)
