= Jackson County School District (Georgia) =

School district in Georgia (U.S. state)

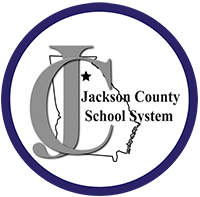

Address
- 1660 Winder Highway Jefferson, Georgia, 30549-5458; United States
- Coordinates: 34.1060164990568°N 83.59611240234851°W

District information
- Grades: Pre-kindergarten – 12
- Established: 1914
- Superintendent: Philip Brown
- Accreditations: Southern Association of Colleges and Schools; Cognia/AdvancED

Students and staff
- Enrollment: 9,918 (2022–23)
- Faculty: 721.80 (FTE)
- Student–teacher ratio: 13.74

Other information
- Telephone: (706) 367-5151
- Fax: (706) 367-9457
- Website: jacksonschoolsga.org

Jackson County School System (JCSS) is a school district in Jackson County, Georgia, United States, based in Jefferson.

Most of the Jackson County is in this school district. However, portions in Commerce and Jefferson are in, respectively, Commerce City School District and Jefferson City School District. The Jackson County district serves the communities of Arcade, Hoschton, Nicholson, Pendergrass, and Talmo. It also includes the Jackson County portions of Braselton and Maysville.

It is run by the Jackson County Schools Board of Education along with superintendent Dr. Philip Brown.

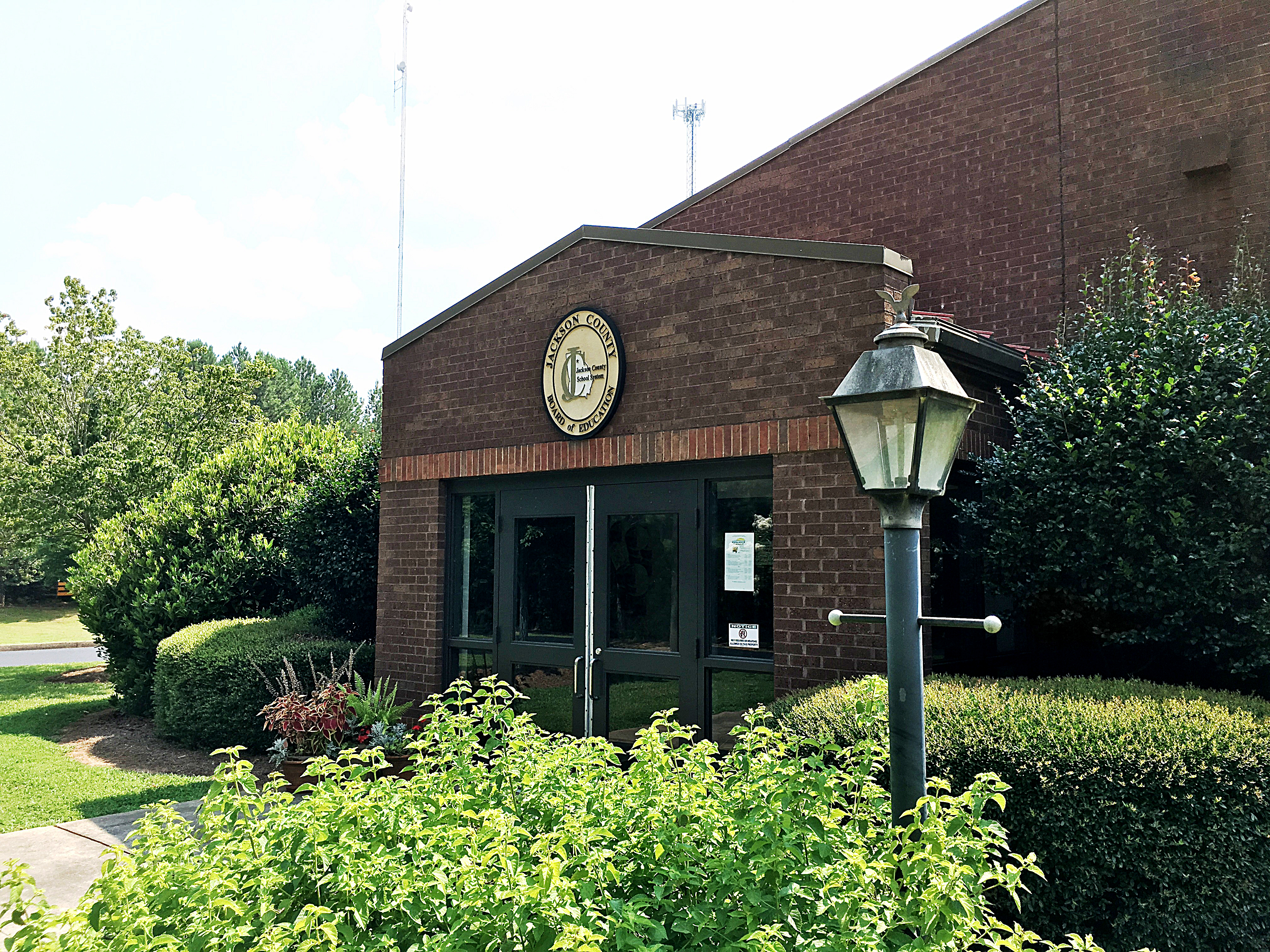
Jackson County School System Central Office

== Board of education ==
The JCSS Board of Education considers and approves the policies that govern Jackson County Schools. The board consists of five members, representing five geographical districts, who are elected per district to represent their district's constituents for a four-year term. As with every Board of Education in the state of Georgia, the JCSS Board of Education elects their own chair and vice-chair. The Superintendent of Jackson County Schools also sits on the JCSS Board of Education.

=== Monthly board meetings ===
Board members meet twice monthly for two types of meetings. The first meeting of the month is called the Board Work Session, during which specifics of the Board of Education Meeting are initially shared and discussed. The second meeting of the month follows the Work Session and is called the Board of Education Meeting.

The Board of Education Meeting is held every second Monday of the month (unless otherwise noted), and the Board of Education Work Sessions are held the Thursday prior. Meetings are open to the public (unless otherwise noted) with openly accessible agendas hosted on the JCSS Board of Education eBoard/Simbli website.

Both the Board of Education work sessions and regular meetings are broadcast live.

=== Board of education members ===
- District 1 - Rob Johnson
- District 2 - Ricky J. Sanders
- District 3 - Beau Hollett (board chairman)
- District 4 - Lynne Massey-Wheeler (vice-chair)
- District 5 - Ty Clack
- School Superintendent - Dr. Philip Brown

== Schools ==
The Jackson County School System has seven elementary schools, three middle schools, two high schools, and one college and career center. Recently, Legacy Knoll Middle School opened in August 2023, and Heroes Elementary School opened in August 2024.

On January 31, 2019, Jackson County Schools broke ground on a new high school building for Jackson County Comprehensive High School. The building was opened in 2021. Upon opening the new Jackson County High School Campus in Hoschton, the former Jackson County High School campus in Jefferson was converted to the Empower College and Career Center.

=== Elementary schools ===
- East Jackson Elementary School
- Gum Springs Elementary School
- Maysville Elementary School
- North Jackson Elementary School
- South Jackson Elementary School
- West Jackson Elementary School
- Heroes Elementary School

=== Middle schools ===
- East Jackson Middle School
- West Jackson Middle School
- Legacy Knoll Middle School

=== High schools ===
- East Jackson Comprehensive High School
- Jackson County Comprehensive High School

=== Career Center ===
- EMPOWER College and Career Center
