= Lurline Collier =

- Born: Lizzie Lurline Collier; October 16, 1893; Jefferson, Georgia, U.S.
- Died: January 13, 1986 (aged 92); Commerce, Georgia, U.S.
- Resting place: Woodbine–Jefferson City Cemetery
- Education: State Normal School, 1913; UGA College of Agricultural and Environmental Sciences, 1924 (BSHE, agriculture; cum laude)
- Occupations: Teacher, deputy sheriff. home demonstration agent

Lizzie Lurline Collier (October 16, 1893 – January 13, 1986) was an American home demonstration agent and teacher. In 2022, she was posthumously named a Georgia Woman of Achievement.

== Biography ==
Lizzie Lurline Collier was born on October 16, 1893, in Jefferson, Georgia to Benjamin Howard Collier and Frances Arnold Collier, the eighth of eleven children. Her father worked as a sheriff for the Jackson County Police Department. Growing up she attended the Martin Institute, where at the age of 13 she passed the teachers licensing exam and taught a 3rd grade class at Center Union School during the summers.

Collier then studied teaching at the State Normal School in Athens and graduated in 1913. She worked for a year at a school in Troup County, then moved back to Jackson County to teach 8th grade.

Collier worked as a home demonstration agent for Jackson County from 1917 to 1923, traveling by train and wagon across rural Georgia; during the outbreak of the Spanish flu, she helped care for 27 families. Additionally, Collier was a delegate to the White House Conference on Children and Youth in 1919, and would go on to serve on its executive committee throughout her career. At one point she worked for her father as a deputy sheriff, the first woman to do so in Jackson County.

After graduating cum laude from the University of Georgia College of Agricultural and Environmental Sciences in 1924, Collier's work as a home demonstration agent continued for decades. She was promoted to northwest district director, served as the first home demonstration agent for DeKalb County from 1924 to 1926, was named clothing specialist for Georgia's home demonstration program in 1926, became an agent for the Georgia girls 4-H club in 1927, and in 1933 was promoted again to run the state's agricultural extension program. In 1944, the Jackson Herald reported that as head of the extension program, Collier oversaw an agency of 116 people serving over 120,000 families across Georgia. Collier retired in December 1953.

Collier was the chairman of the Georgia Nutritional Committee until her resignation in 1950. In 1952, Collier was honored as "Woman of the Year in Service to Georgia Rural Progress" by Birmingham, Alabama-based magazine Progressive Farmer.

Collier was involved in her local community in Jackson County as well. She helped found the Piedmont Regional Library, worked with the Jackson County Historical Society, and was active in the Jefferson United Methodist Church. Collier also ran her own farm, and was the first woman who qualified to vote in Jackson County following the passage of the 19th Amendment.

Collier died on January 13, 1986, aged 92, at Banks-Jackson-Commerce Hospital in Commerce, Georgia due to complications following a stroke.
