= Sammy Brown (linebacker, born 2005) =

American football player (born 2005)

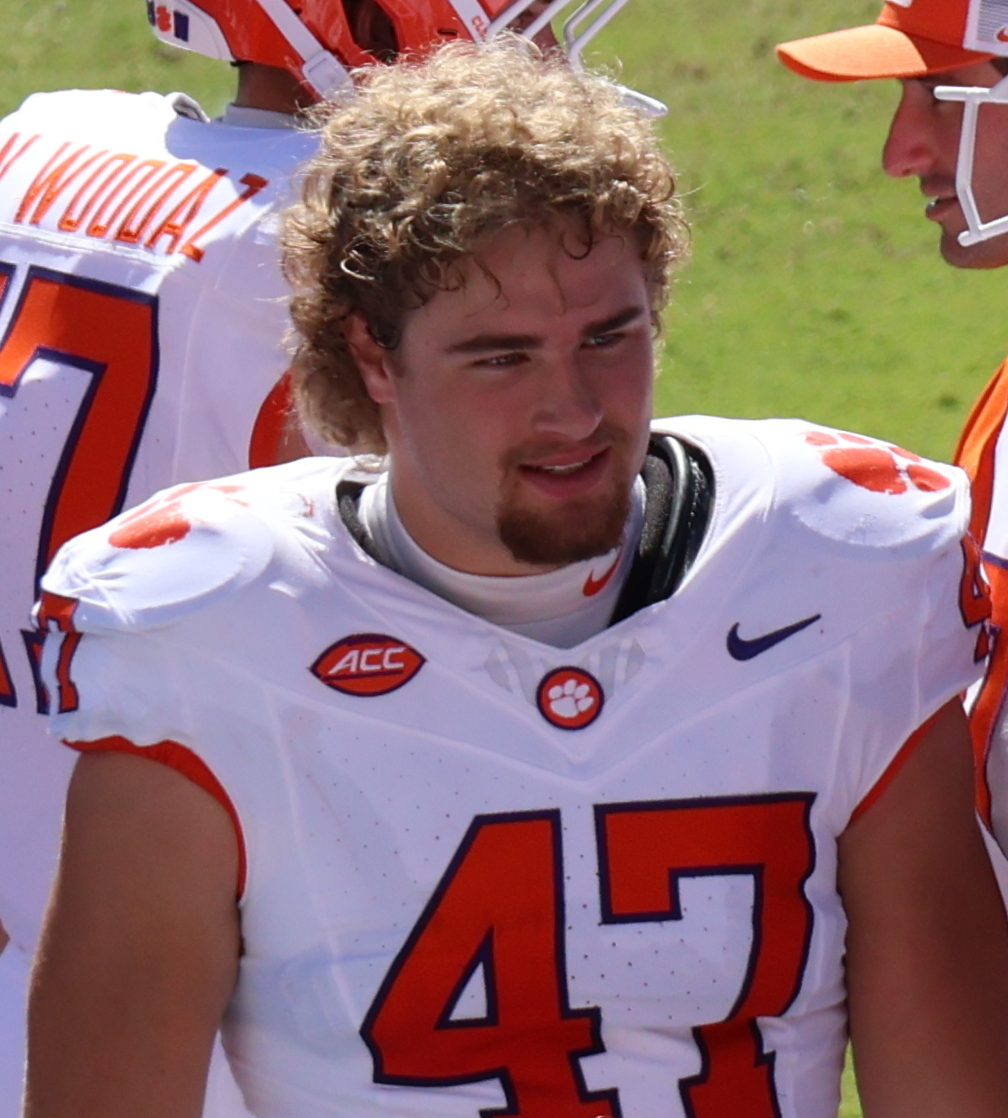
- Brown with the Clemson Tigers in 2025

No. 47 – Clemson Tigers
- Position: Linebacker
- Class: Junior

Personal information
- Born: September 29, 2005 (age 21)
- Listed height: 6 ft 2 in (1.88 m)
- Listed weight: 235 lb (107 kg)

Career information
- High school: Jefferson (Jefferson, Georgia)
- College: Clemson (2024–present)

Awards and highlights
- ACC Defensive Rookie of the Year (2024); First-team All-ACC (2025)
- Stats at ESPN

Sammy Brown (born September 29, 2005) is an American college football linebacker for the Clemson Tigers.

== Early life ==
Brown initially attended Commerce High School in Commerce, Georgia where his father, Michael Brown, was the head football coach. As a freshman at Commerce, he rushed 133 times for 1,368 yards, gained 181 yards on six receptions, and scored 19 total touchdowns on offense. He also tallied 41 tackles and two sacks on defense. After his freshman year, Brown transferred to Jefferson High School after his father was hired as the school's football coach. He rushed for 753 yards and 11 touchdowns and recorded 35 tackles and with one sack in his first season at Jefferson. Brown was named first-team all-state after he made 113 tackles on defense and rushed for 1,449 yards and 21 touchdowns on offense as a junior. He also won individual state championships in wrestling and in the 400-meter dash and was named the MaxPreps Male Athlete of the Year at the end of his junior school year.

Brown was originally rated a four-star recruit by most recruiting services but was later rerated as a five-star prospect. Several outlets have ranked him as the best inside linebacker in the 2024 class. Brown committed to play college football at Clemson over offers from Georgia, Ohio State, Tennessee, and Oklahoma.

== College career ==
Brown joined the Clemson Tigers as an early enrollee in January 2024.

=== Statistics ===
College statistics
Year	Team	GP	Tackles					Interceptions					Fumbles	
Year	Team	GP	Solo	Ast	Tot	Loss	Sk	Int	Yds	Avg	TD	PD	FF	FR
2024	Clemson	14	47	33	80	11.5	5.0	0	0	—	0	3	0	0
2025	Clemson	13	51	55	106	13.5	5.0	1	19	19.0	0	5	1	1
Career		27	98	88	186	25.0	10	1	19	19.0	0	8	1	1

== Personal life ==
Brown's father played college football at Furman.

Starks is friends with Baltimore Ravens safety Malaki Starks, the two played at Jefferson High School together, and played against each other in the Aflac Kickoff Game in 2024.
