= Commerce High School =

Commerce High School may refer to:

- Commerce High School (Commerce, Georgia)
- Commerce High School (Commerce, Texas)
- The High School of Commerce (New York City), 1902–1968 (first high school of its kind in the USA)
- High School of Commerce (Massachusetts)

== See also ==
- High School of Commerce (Ottawa)
