= William M. Howard =

American politician

William Marcellus Howard
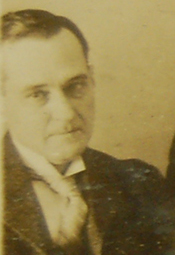
- Howard in 1909

Member of the U.S. House of Representatives from Georgia's 8th district
- In office March 4, 1897 – March 3, 1911
- Preceded by: Thomas G. Lawson
- Succeeded by: Samuel J. Tribble

Personal details
- Born: December 6, 1857 Berwick, Louisiana
- Died: July 5, 1932 (aged 74) Augusta, Georgia
- Education: Martin Institute; University of Georgia

William Marcellus Howard (December 6, 1857 – July 5, 1932) was a noted jurist and politician from the American state of Georgia.

== Life ==
Howard was born in Berwick, Louisiana and moved to Georgia with his family while in his youth. He attended the Martin Institute in Jefferson, Georgia, and graduated from the University of Georgia in Athens with a Bachelor of Philosophy in 1877.

After admission to the state bar in 1880, Howard practised law in Lexington, Georgia. He was elected as the solicitor general of Georgia's northern circuit and served in that capacity from 1884 until 1896 when he successfully ran for the United States House of Representatives. He was re-elected to this office six times (1898, 1900, 1902, 1904, 1906 and 1908) before losing the nomination for the 1910 election.

During his last few terms in the U.S. House and for several years after leaving that body, Howard served on the Board of Regents of the Smithsonian Institution (1905 through 1912) and was a trustee of the Carnegie Endowment for International Peace.

President Howard Taft appointed Howard to the United States Tariff Board in 1911 and he served in that capacity until 1913. At that time, Howard moved to Augusta, Georgia.

Howard was appointed to appeal Leo Frank's death sentence after Frank was convicted in the murder of Mary Phagan in 1915. Howard cited flaws in the prosecution's case, including discrepancies in testimony and mishandling of the investigation by Atlanta police, to successfully convince Georgia Gov. John M. Slaton to commute Frank's death sentence to life in prison.

Howard died in Augusta, Georgia in 1932 and was buried in Clarke Cemetery in Lexington.

U.S. House of Representatives
Preceded by Thomas G. Lawson	Member of the U.S. House of Representatives from Georgia's 8th congressional district March 4, 1897 – March 3, 1911	Succeeded by Samuel J. Tribble
