= Brandon Mosley =

American football player (born 1988)

No. 67, 75
- Position: Guard

Personal information
- Born: December 21, 1988 (age 37); Jefferson, Georgia, U.S.
- Listed height: 6 ft 5 in (1.96 m)
- Listed weight: 314 lb (142 kg)

Career information
- High school: Jefferson
- College: Auburn
- NFL draft: 2012: 4th round, 131st overall pick

Career history
- New York Giants (2012–2015)

Awards and highlights
- BCS national champion (2011); Second-team All-SEC (2011)

Career NFL statistics
- Games played: 22
- Games started: 1
- Stats at Pro Football Reference

Brandon Mosley (born December 21, 1988) is an American former professional football player who was a guard in the National Football League (NFL). He played college football for the Auburn Tigers and was selected by the Giants in the fourth round of the 2012 NFL draft.

== Early life ==
Mosley attended Jefferson High School in Jefferson, Georgia, where he played defensive end for the Jefferson Dragons high school football team.

== College career ==
Mosley attended Coffeyville Community College, where he played defensive end and tight end for the Coffeyville Red Ravens football team from 2008 to 2009.

Rated as a four-star recruit by Rivals.com, Mosley was ranked as the No. 19 junior college prospect in 2010.

Mosley accepted an athletic scholarship to attend Auburn University, where he played for coach Gene Chizik's Auburn Tigers football team from 2010 to 2011.

Mosley went on to become a two-year starter for the Tigers at right tackle.

== Professional career ==
Mosley was selected with the 131st overall pick in the fourth round of the 2012 NFL draft by the New York Giants. On September 1, 2015, he was waived/injured by the Giants. On the following day, Mosley cleared waivers and was reverted to the Giants' injured reserve list.
