= Martin Institute =

Coordinates: 34°7.043′N 83°34.454′W

The Martin Institute was a school in Jefferson, Georgia, United States, from 1818 to 1942.

== History ==
On November 20, 1818, the Georgia General Assembly approved the formation of the co-educational school to be called Jackson County Academy in Jefferson, Georgia.

The Jackson County Academy operated under this name, and informally as the Jefferson Academy, until December 1859 when a judge in the Inferior Court of Jackson County from 1819–1827, William Duncan Martin, willed upon his death a substantial endowment to the school; the name was soon changed to the Martin Institute. The Martin Institute was the first privately endowed educational institute in the United States of America.

In 1874 the Martin Institute was granted collegiate status, which is roughly equivalent to high school or lower undergraduate today. Between 1870 and 1882, the number of students in attendance ranged from 120 to 270.

In October 1883, the old building burned down. The new building was completed in 1886 at a cost of $15,000. It was a two-story brick building on a hill north of and just outside the city of Jefferson, with classroom (then called recitation room) seating for nearly 300 students comprised the first floor, with a large chapel, vestibule, stage, and music rooms occupying the second story. The building was crowned with a belfry, from which ringing was said to be audible for miles.

When the school burned again on January 13, 1942, it was a student, the son of the police chief of Jefferson, who had intentionally set the blaze to avoid coming to school. The students and teachers met in local churches until a new building on a newly donated site was completed in 1946. The name was then changed to Jefferson Elementary and High School as part of the Jefferson City School District.

== Notable students, teachers, and administrators ==
The school had a significant reputation for its fine scholarship and excellent teachers, attracting students from several neighboring states and a few foreign countries. Among its most notable students:

- Damon Jesse Gause - United States Army Air Corps Officer (1915–1944), was captured and escaped from Bataan, then Corregidor and became a hero of World War II.
- William Marcellus Howard - United States Congressman (1897–1911) and Taft-appointee to the United States Tariff Board (1911–1913).
- Joseph Rucker Lamar - Associate Justice of the Supreme Court of the United States (1911–1916).
- Moina Michael - The "Poppy Lady" who conceived the idea of using poppy as a symbol of remembrance for those who served in World War I.
- Lizzie Lurline Collier

Among its most notable teachers and administrators:

- Gustavus Orr - Principal of the Jefferson Academy in 1847, he later became the second State Commissioner of Education.

== Legacy ==
The legacy of the Martin Institute lives on:

- Several streets near the Martin Institute building are now called Martin, Institute, and College Streets.
- Several Martin Institute alumni are still alive today, and they continue to meet for reunions, though their numbers are greatly diminished.
- In 2007, the Jefferson City Schools opened Jefferson Academy, serving grades 3, 4, and 5. The architecture of the new school building was designed to pay homage to the facade of the Martin Institute building which burned down in 1942.
- Also in 2007, the Jefferson City Schools completed construction on the William Duncan Martin Performing Arts Center, located on the campus of Jefferson High School. This state-of-the-art facility is now home to all general music, band, chorus, and theatre productions in the Jefferson City Schools, as well as numerous civic activities.
