= Malaki Starks =

American football player (born 2003)

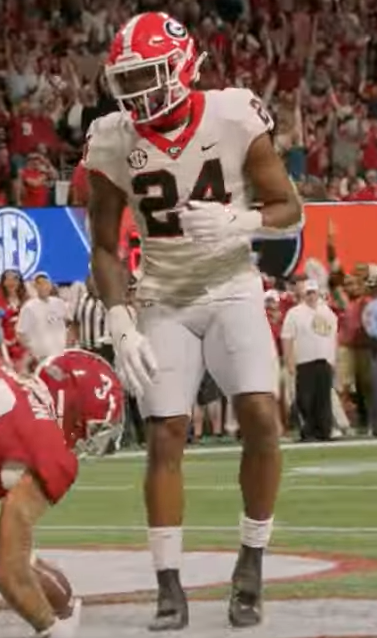
- Starks with the Georgia Bulldogs in 2023

No. 24 – Baltimore Ravens
- Position: Safety
- Roster status: Active

Personal information
- Born: November 13, 2003 (age 22)
- Listed height: 6 ft 1 in (1.85 m)
- Listed weight: 205 lb (93 kg)

Career information
- High school: Jefferson (Jefferson, Georgia)
- College: Georgia (2022–2024)
- NFL draft: 2025: 1st round, 27th overall pick

Career history
- Baltimore Ravens (2025–present)

Awards and highlights
- CFP national champion (2022); Consensus All-American (2023); First-team All-American (2024); 2× first-team All-SEC (2023, 2024); Freshman All-American (2022)

Career NFL statistics as of Week 8, 2026
- Tackles: 135
- Sacks: 1
- Fumble recoveries: 1
- Pass deflections: 5
- Interceptions: 2
- Stats at Pro Football Reference

William Malaki Starks (born November 13, 2003) is an American professional football safety for the Baltimore Ravens of the National Football League (NFL). He played college football for the Georgia Bulldogs, winning a national championship in 2022. Starks was selected by the Ravens with the 27th pick in the first round of the 2025 NFL draft.

== Early life ==
Starks grew up in Jefferson, Georgia, where he attended Jefferson High School. A five star recruit, he was ranked by ESPN as the No. 12 recruit in college football's class of 2022. In October 2021, he committed to play college football at the University of Georgia.

== College career ==
As a true freshman, Starks emerged as Bulldogs' starting free safety, leading the defense in total snaps played, and finished second on the team in tackles as Georgia won the national championship. As a sophomore in 2023, he was named a consensus All-American.

On January 6, 2025, Starks declared for the 2025 NFL draft.

== Professional career ==
Pre-draft measurables
Height	Weight	Arm length	Hand span	Wingspan	40-yard dash	10-yard split	20-yard split	20-yard shuttle	Three-cone drill	Vertical jump
6 ft 0 7/8 in (1.85 m)	197 lb (89 kg)	31 5/8 in (0.80 m)	9 1/2 in (0.24 m)	6 ft 6 3/8 in (1.99 m)	4.50 s	1.51 s	2.62 s	4.45 s	7.26 s	33.0 in (0.84 m)
All values from NFL Combine

Starks was selected by the Baltimore Ravens in the first round with 27th overall pick of the 2025 NFL draft.

== Career statistics ==
=== NFL ===
Year	Team	Games		Tackles					Interceptions						Fumbles				
Year	Team	GP	GS	Cmb	Solo	Ast	Sck	TFL	Int	Yds	Avg	Lng	TD	PD	FF	Fmb	FR	Yds	TD
2025	BAL	**17**	15	84	49	35	0.0	1	2	9	4.5	9	0	4	0	0	0	0	0
2026	BAL	8	8	51	30	21	**1.0**	4	0	0	0.0	0	0	1	0	0	1	0	0
Career		25	23	135	79	56	1.0	5	2	9	4.5	9	0	5	0	0	1	0	0

=== College ===
Legend
	CFP national champion
**Bold**	Career high

Year	Team	GP	Tackles					Interceptions					Fumbles		
Year	Team	GP	Solo	Ast	Cmb	TFL	Sck	Int	Yds	Avg	TD	PD	FR	FF	TD
2022	Georgia	**15**	44	24	68	2	0.0	3	42	**21.0**	0	**7**	0	0	0
2023	Georgia	14	31	21	52	0	0.0	**3**	**47**	15.7	0	**7**	0	0	0
2024	Georgia	14	**52**	**25**	**77**	**4**	0.0	1	0	0.0	0	3	0	0	0
Career		43	127	70	197	6	0.0	6	89	14.8	0	17	0	0	0

== Personal life ==
Starks is friends with Clemson linebacker Sammy Brown, the two played at Jefferson High School together, and played against each other in the Aflac Kickoff Game in 2024.

Starks is a Christian.
