= Gene White (American football) =

American football player (1932–2017)

No. 88
- Position: Defensive back

Personal information
- Born: June 21, 1932; Greensboro, North Carolina, U.S.
- Died: July 7, 2017 (aged 85); Pinehurst, North Carolina, U.S.
- Listed height: 6 ft 2 in (1.88 m)
- Listed weight: 205 lb (93 kg)

Career information
- High school: Commerce (Commerce, Georgia)
- College: Georgia (1950–1953)
- NFL draft: 1954: undrafted

Career history
- Green Bay Packers (1954, 1957)

Career NFL statistics
- Interceptions: 1
- Fumble recoveries: 1
- Stats at Pro Football Reference

Eugene Carlton White (June 21, 1932 – July 7, 2017) was an American professional football player who was a defensive back in the National Football League (NFL). He played college football as an end for the Georgia Bulldogs before signing with the Green Bay Packers, switching to defensive back in the NFL. He played one season in the NFL before leaving to serve in the United States Army, then briefly returned in 1957 before ending his football career.

== Early life ==
White was born on June 21, 1932, in Greensboro, North Carolina. He attended Commerce High School in Georgia where he competed in football, track and field and basketball. He was a top member of the track team and twice scored four touchdowns in a game while playing for the football team. He was a two-time team captain in basketball and won both the 440-yard dash and the shot put events at the 1950 district championships.

White enrolled at the University of Georgia in 1950. He was not a top college football recruit but decided to walk on and try out for Georgia's football team. The Atlanta Journal reported that he "just showed up" and impressed enough that he made the team. At the end of his freshman season, he was placed on scholarship. An end, he won a starting position for Georgia during the 1951 season. That year, in 10 games, he recorded 18 receptions for 226 yards. He then caught nine passes for 133 yards and one touchdown in 1952 while being limited by injury. Considered one of the fastest players at his position in the Southeastern Conference, he concluded his collegiate career by catching 13 passes for 188 yards and a touchdown as a senior in 1953. As a member of Georgia's football team, he received three varsity letters. White was also a member of Georgia's track team as a hurdler.

== Professional career ==
After going unselected in the 1954 NFL draft, White signed with the Green Bay Packers. After signing, the team moved him to play defensive back, as they already had several ends. He added 15 pounds (6.8 kg) by his first season in the NFL, standing at 6 feet 3 inches (1.91 m) and weighing 205 pounds (93 kg). He made the team and appeared in nine games, eight as a starter, while missing several due to an injury sustained while blocking. While playing for the Packers, he recorded an interception, which he returned for 20 yards, and a fumble recovery. He was awarded a watch as the team's most outstanding player of the game after he led the team in tackles and pass breakups against the San Francisco 49ers. White left the Packers prior to the 1955 season to serve in the United States Army.

White served in East Asia as a lieutenant and played for the Army All-Stars football team. In 1956, he was part of an Army team that beat the Navy 35–0 in the Torii Bowl in Tokyo, Japan. He later returned to the Packers in 1957 but was released before appearing in any games.

== Later life and death ==
After his football career, White returned to Georgia and worked in real estate. He received a post-graduate achievement award in 2010 from the Georgia chapter of the National Football Foundation College Hall of Fame. With his wife, Rene, White had a son and a daughter. He moved in 1994 to Moore County, North Carolina, and died there on July 7, 2017, at the age of 85.
