= Jackson County Comprehensive High School =

Public high school in Hoschton, Georgia, United States

Jackson County High School

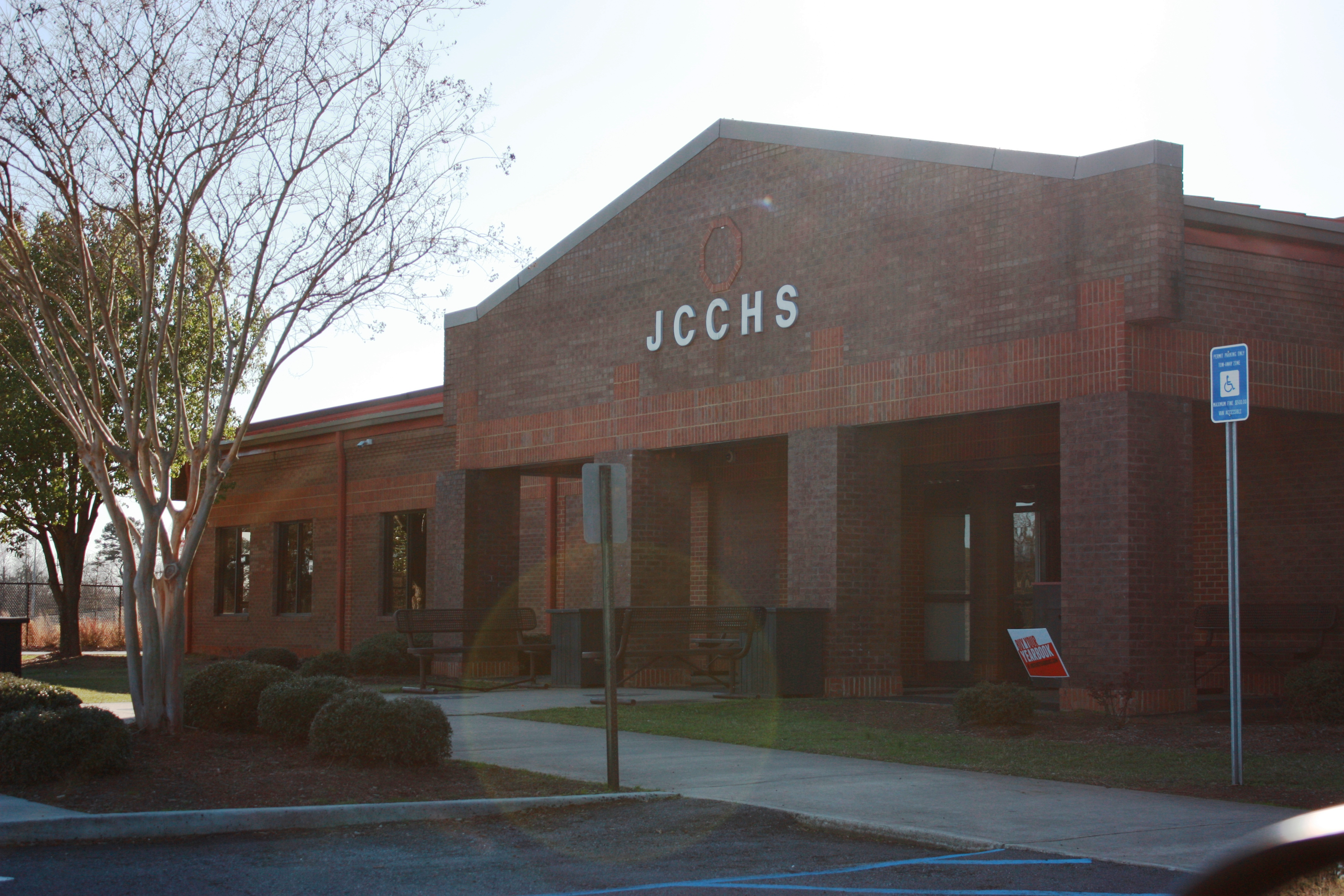
- Jackson County High School in 2017

Location
- 152 Jaxco Junction; Hoschton, Georgia; United States
- Coordinates: 34°06′48″N 83°41′22″W

Information
- Type: Public school
- School district: Jackson County School District
- Principal: Melissa Gillespie
- Teaching staff: 105.00 (FTE)
- Grades: 9–12
- Enrollment: 2,222 (2024–2025)
- Student to teacher ratio: 21.16
- Campus: Rural
- Colors: Black, red, and white
- Mascot: Panthers
- Website: jchs.jacksonschoolsga.org

Jackson County High School (JCHS) is located in Hoschton, Georgia, United States. It was formerly named Jackson County Comprehensive High School until 2021. It is one of two high schools in the Jackson County School District. It is fed by West Jackson Middle School and the neighboring Legacy Knoll Middle School.

The school competes in region 8-AAAAA. JCCHS is known for its academics, band, Army JROTC, FFA, softball, wrestling, tennis, basketball, and football programs.

== New school building ==
On January 31, 2019, Jackson County School District built a new high school building to replace the old building of Jackson County Comprehensive High School, which opened in the 2021–2022 school year. The former JCCHS campus was converted into the Empower College and Career Center, a charter high school that will serve students from the Jackson County School District and the Commerce City School District.

== In the news ==
On February 14, 2007, at about 8:30 am, freshman Andrew Criswell entered the front office with a homemade bomb. He held two people hostage in the front office, until one of them tricked him into looking the other way as they left through the back. The Georgia Bureau of Investigation, local police authorities, state police authorities, a SWAT team, and bomb squads came to JCCHS. After two hours of negotiations, Crisswell surrendered. The other 1,800 students and 250 faculty and staff evacuated to the Jefferson Civic Center. It was said that Crisswell was trying to make money for a relative's surgery.

On March 29, 2017, an unidentified female teenager called the police to report that a gunman was in the building. This was a hoax and caused the school to be evacuated. The teenager was later identified by police, but not to the public, and was found to be attending East Jackson Comprehensive High School.

== Notable alumni ==
- Brian Bowles - wrestler and professional mixed martial artist, formerly competing in the UFC bantamweight
- Trentyn Flowers - basketball player
