= BC Roma =

- Leagues: LBA; EuroCup
- Founded: 2026
- History: BC Roma; 2026–present
- Arena: Palazzetto dello Sport
- Capacity: 3,500
- Location: Rome, Lazio, Italy
- Team colors: Red and Yellow
- President: Donnie Nelson
- Head coach: Alessandro Magro
- Website: officialbcroma.com
Home	Away

Basketball Club Roma, initially known as Roma SPQR, is an Italian professional basketball team based in Rome, Lazio. The club plays in the Lega Basket Serie A (LBA), the highest level of competition in Italy, and in the EuroCup.

== History ==
Basketball Club Roma was founded in 2026. The club was established through the acquisition and relocation of the sporting licence of Vanoli Cremona. From its inception, the project was led by former NBA executive Donnie Nelson. NBA player Luka Dončić and the former Italian basketball coach Valerio Bianchini were also involved in the project.

== Players ==
=== Current roster ===
Note: Flags indicate national team eligibility at FIBA-sanctioned events. Players may hold other non-FIBA nationalities not displayed.

BC Roma roster
Players
Coaches

Pos.	No.	Nat.	Name	Ht.	Wt.	Age
PG	1	(Italy)	Mannion, Nico	1.90 m (6 ft 3 in)	84 kg (185 lb)	25 – 14 March 2001
G/F	3	(United States)	Watson, Paul	1.98 m (6 ft 6 in)	95 kg (209 lb)	31 – 30 December 1994
PG	5	(United States)	Davis Jr., Corey	1.85 m (6 ft 1 in)	86 kg (190 lb)	29 – 4 June 1997
C	7	(Italy)	Emejuru, Giovanni	2.08 m (6 ft 10 in)	121 kg (267 lb)	23 – 21 December 2002
F	9	(United States)	Flowers, Trentyn	2.06 m (6 ft 9 in)	84 kg (185 lb)	21 – 5 March 2005
G	10	(United States)	Stevenson, Erik	1.93 m (6 ft 4 in)	93 kg (205 lb)	27 – 28 April 1999
G	11	(France)	Ayayi, Gérald	1.90 m (6 ft 3 in)	88 kg (194 lb)	25 – 24 August 2001
G/F	12	(Latvia)	Strautiņš, Artūrs	1.98 m (6 ft 6 in)	100 kg (220 lb)	28 – 23 October 1998
F	13	(Democratic Republic of the Congo)	Odzebe, Giannis	1.96 m (6 ft 5 in)	86 kg (190 lb)	17 – 23 November 2008
C	19	(Montenegro)	Simonović, Marko	2.13 m (7 ft 0 in)	100 kg (220 lb)	27 – 15 October 1999
F/C	22	(Canada)	Olynyk, Kelly	2.13 m (7 ft 0 in)	109 kg (240 lb)	35 – 19 April 1991
PF	24	(Italy)	Mezzanotte, Andrea	2.07 m (6 ft 9 in)	98 kg (216 lb)	28 – 8 April 1998
PG	33	(United States)	Iuzzolino, Mike	1.85 m (6 ft 1 in)	81 kg (179 lb)	24 – 1 January 2002

Head coach

- (Italy) Alessandro Magro

Assistant coach(es)

- (Italy) Emanuele Di Paolantonio
- (Italy) Davide Bonora
- (Italy) Edoardo Casalone
- (Montenegro) Stefan Ivanović

Legend

- (C) Team captain
- Injured

- Roster
Updated: October 3, 2026

=== Depth chart ===
Pos.	Starting 5	Bench 1	Bench 2
C	Kelly Olynyk	Marko Simonović	Giovanni Emejuru
PF	Trentyn Flowers	Andrea Mezzanotte
SF	Paul Watson	Artūrs Strautiņš	Giannis Odzebe
SG	Gérald Ayayi	Erik Stevenson
PG	Nico Mannion	Corey Davis Jr.	Mike Iuzzolino

(colors: Italian or homegrown players; foreign players; young players)
