= Corey Davis Jr. =

American basketball player (born 1997)

- Davis with BC Roma in 2026

No. 5 – BC Roma
- Position: Point guard
- League: LBA; EuroCup

Personal information
- Born: June 4, 1997 (age 29) Lafayette, Louisiana, U.S.
- Listed height: 1.85 m (6 ft 1 in)
- Listed weight: 81 kg (179 lb)

Career information
- High school: Lafayette (Lafayette, Louisiana)
- College: San Jacinto JC (2015–2017); Houston (2017–2019)
- NBA draft: 2019: undrafted
- Playing career: 2019–present

Career history
- 2019–2020: Afyon Belediye
- 2020–2021: BCM Gravelines-Dunkerque
- 2021: Mornar
- 2021–2023: Pallacanestro Trieste
- 2023–2024: Bàsquet Girona
- 2024: Calgary Surge
- 2024–2025: Vanoli Cremona
- 2025: Vancouver Bandits
- 2025–2026: Niners Chemnitz
- 2026–present: BC Roma

Career highlights
- First-team All-AAC (2019)

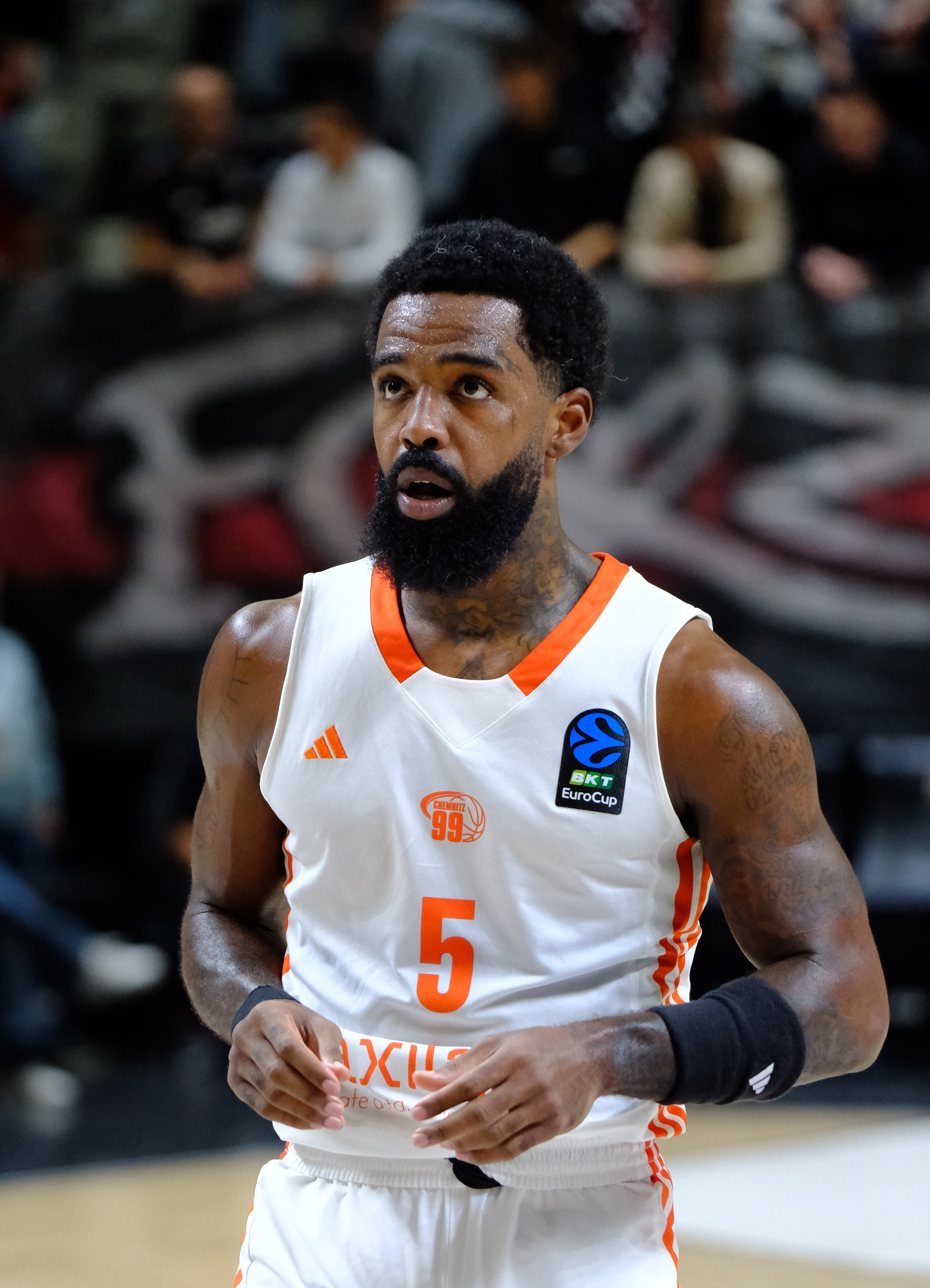
Davis with Niners Chemnitz in 2025

Corey Richard Davis Jr. (born June 4, 1997) is an American professional basketball player for BC Roma of the Lega Basket Serie A (LBA) and the EuroCup. He played college basketball for the Houston Cougars.

== Early life and high school ==
Davis competed at Lafayette High School under coach Clifton Brown. As a senior, he averaged 14 points, nine rebounds, four assists and two blocks per game. Davis led the team to a 26–4 record and District 3-5A championship, though the team lost to Parkway High School 69–68 in the state semifinals despite 26 points from Davis. He was named the 2015 Daily Advertiser All-Acadiana Most Valuable Player.

== College career ==
Davis signed with Louisiana out of high school but was ruled ineligible. He played at San Jacinto Junior College for two seasons, missing part of his freshman season with an injured knee. He was named a NJCAA first-team All-American as a sophomore at San Jacinto, posting 17.4 points per game. Davis selected Houston over offers from Arizona, LSU, New Mexico State and Oklahoma State.

In his junior season, Davis helped Houston reach the NCAA Tournament for the second time since 1992, serving as the second-leading scorer to Rob Gray. He posted 13.1 points per game as a junior. As a senior, Davis averaged 17.1 points, 3.4 rebounds and 2.8 assists per game. He led Houston to the Sweet 16 of the NCAA Tournament. Davis was a unanimous selection to the First–team All-American Athletic Conference.

== Professional career ==
After not being selected in the 2019 NBA draft, Davis signed with the Washington Wizards. On September 5, 2019, he signed with Afyon Belediye of the Turkish Basketball Super League (BSL). On June 6, 2020, Davis signed with BCM Gravelines-Dunkerque of the LNB Pro A. He averaged 13.4 points and 3.0 assists per game. Davis signed with KK Mornar Bar of the ABA League on July 19, 2021.

On December 9, 2021, he signed in the Italian Serie A with Pallacanestro Trieste.

On October 23, 2023, Davis signed with Bàsquet Girona of the Spanish Liga ACB.

On April 4, 2024, Davis Jr signed with Calgary Surge of the Canadian Elite Basketball League CEBL.

On July 16, 2024, he signed with Vanoli Cremona of the Italian Lega Basket Serie A (LBA).

On June 12, 2025, he signed with the Vancouver Bandits of the Canadian Elite Basketball League.

On July 3, 2025, he signed with Niners Chemnitz of the Basketball Bundesliga (BBL). Davis averaged 12.4 points, 2.1 rebounds and 6.3 assists per game. On August 14, 2026, he signed with BC Roma of the Lega Basket Serie A.

== Career statistics ==
Legend
GP	Games played	GS	Games started	MPG	Minutes per game
FG%	Field goal percentage	3P%	3-point field goal percentage	FT%	Free throw percentage
RPG	Rebounds per game	APG	Assists per game	SPG	Steals per game
BPG	Blocks per game	PPG	Points per game	**Bold**	Career high

=== College ===
Year	Team	GP	GS	MPG	FG%	3P%	FT%	RPG	APG	SPG	BPG	PPG
2017–18	Houston	35	30	30.2	**.443**	**.429**	.808	3.1	2.4	.9	.0	13.1
2018–19	Houston	**37**	**36**	**33.1**	.420	.375	**.869**	**3.3**	**2.8**	**1.0**	**.1**	**17.0**
Career		72	66	31.7	.432	.402	.836	3.2	2.6	0.9	.0	15.1
