= Erik Stevenson =

American basketball player (born 1999)

- Stevenson with BC Roma in 2026

No. 10 – BC Roma
- Position: Shooting guard / point guard
- League: LBA; EuroCup

Personal information
- Born: April 28, 1999 (age 27) Lacey, Washington, U.S.
- Listed height: 6 ft 4 in (1.93 m)
- Listed weight: 205 lb (93 kg)

Career information
- High school: Timberline (Lacey, Washington)
- College: Wichita State (2018–2020); Washington (2020–2021); South Carolina (2021–2022); West Virginia (2022–2023)
- NBA draft: 2023: undrafted
- Playing career: 2023–present

Career history
- 2023–2024: Austin Spurs
- 2024: Texas Legends
- 2024: Cholet
- 2024–2025: Capital City Go-Go
- 2025: Casademont Zaragoza
- 2025–2026: Manisa Basket
- 2026–present: BC Roma

Career highlights
- Third-team All-Big 12 (2023)
- Stats at NBA.com
- Stats at Basketball Reference

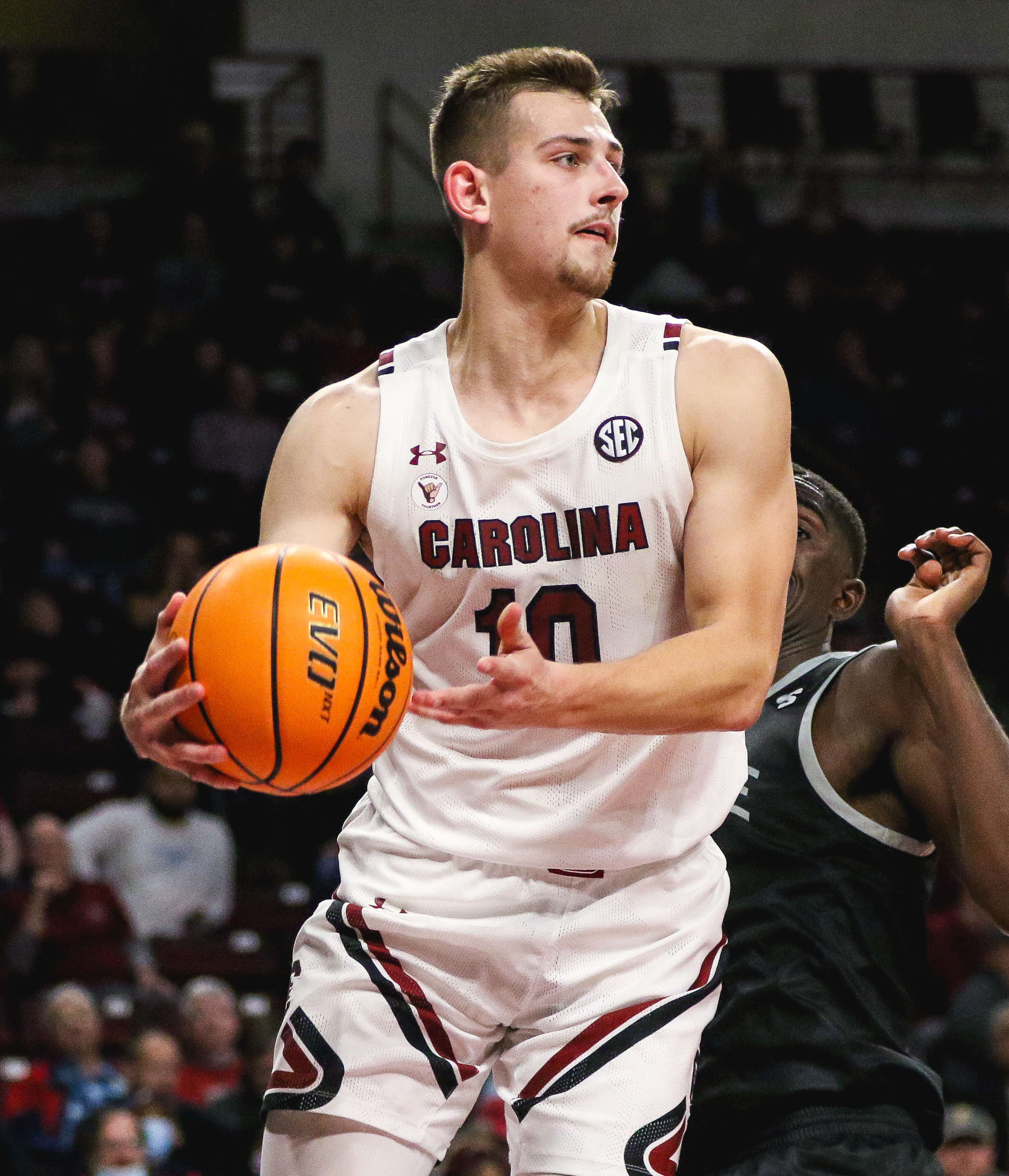
Stevenson with South Carolina in 2021

Erik James Stevenson (born April 28, 1999) is an American professional basketball player for BC Roma of the Lega Basket Serie A (LBA) and the EuroCup. He played college basketball for the Wichita State Shockers, the Washington Huskies, the South Carolina Gamecocks and the West Virginia Mountaineers.

== Early life ==
Stevenson attended Timberline High School in Lacey, Washington where he averaged 24.7 points, 7.1 rebounds, 3.1 assists, 2.9 steals and 1.7 blocks as a senior while helping his team reach a fourth-place finish in Washington's Class 3A State Tournament, their deepest run since 1981, while earning first team All-Class 3A honors from the Associated Press, The Seattle Times and the News Tribune.

== College career ==
Stevenson played for the Wichita State Shockers, the Washington Huskies, the South Carolina Gamecocks and the West Virginia Mountaineers through five years and as a super-senior for the Mountaineers, he played in 34 games and averaged 15.4 points, 3.4 rebounds, and 2.5 assists in 26.0 minutes per game while posting a shooting line of .430/.379/.796.

== Professional career ==
=== Austin Spurs (2023–2024) ===
After going undrafted in the 2023 NBA draft, Stevenson joined the San Antonio Spurs for the 2023 NBA Summer League and on October 10, he signed with the team, being subsequently waived two days later. On October 31, he signed with the Austin Spurs where he played 38 games and averaging 9.8 points, 3.8 rebounds, and 2.7 assists per game.

=== Texas Legends (2024) ===
On March 4, 2024, Stevenson was traded to the Texas Legends, playing 10 games and averaging 10.6 points, 2.4 rebounds and 3.0 assists in 21.7 minutes per game.

=== Cholet (2024) ===
On April 22, 2024, Stevenson signed with Cholet of the LNB Élite where he played in four games.

=== Capital City Go-Go / Washington Wizards (2024–2025) ===
After joining them for the 2024 NBA Summer League, Stevenson signed an Exhibit 10 deal with the Washington Wizards on October 11, 2024. However, he was waived two days later. On October 28, 2024, he joined the Capital City Go-Go. On February 18, 2025, Stevenson signed a 10-day contract with the Wizards, but never appeared in an NBA game for them.

=== Basket Zaragoza (2025) ===
On August 2, 2025, Stevenson signed with Casademont Zaragoza of the Spanish Liga ACB. He parted ways with the team on December 16.

=== Manisa Basket (2025–2026) ===
On December 18, 2025, he signed with Manisa Basket of the Basketbol Süper Ligi (BSL).

== Personal life ==
The son of Craig and Debbie Stevenson, he has a sister. All three played college basketball and his father also played in Europe and Australia.
