= 2017–18 Houston Cougars men's basketball team =

American college basketball season

2017–18 Houston Cougars men's basketball

NCAA tournament, Second Round

Ranking
- Coaches: No. 22
- AP: No. 21
- Record: 27–8 (14–4 AAC)
- Head coach: Kelvin Sampson (4th season)
- Assistant coaches: Alvin Brooks; Kellen Sampson; Quannas White
- Home arena: H&PE Arena (temporary arena)

2017–18 American Athletic Conference men's basketball standings
	Conf.				Overall
Team	W		L	PCT	W		L	PCT
No. 6 Cincinnati †	16	–	2	.889	31	–	5	.861
No. 21 Houston	14	–	4	.778	27	–	8	.771
No. 16 Wichita State	14	–	4	.778	25	–	8	.758
Tulsa	12	–	6	.667	19	–	12	.613
Memphis	10	–	8	.556	21	–	13	.618
UCF	9	–	9	.500	19	–	13	.594
Temple	8	–	10	.444	17	–	16	.515
UConn	7	–	11	.389	14	–	18	.438
SMU	6	–	12	.333	17	–	16	.515
Tulane	5	–	13	.278	14	–	17	.452
East Carolina	4	–	14	.222	10	–	20	.333
South Florida	3	–	15	.167	10	–	22	.313
† 2018 AAC tournament winner Rankings from AP poll

The 2017–18 Houston Cougars men's basketball team represented the University of Houston during the 2017–18 NCAA Division I men's basketball season. The Cougars were led by fourth-year head coach Kelvin Sampson as members of the American Athletic Conference. Due to renovations to the Cougars home arena, Hofheinz Pavilion, they played their home games at the H&PE Arena on the campus of Texas Southern University.

The Cougars ended the season with a record of 27–8. They tied for second place in regular-season conference play with a record of 14–4. As the No. 3 seed in the AAC tournament, Houston advanced to the final game, losing 56–55 to the Cincinnati Bearcats. The Cougars earned a No. 6 seed in the West Regional of the NCAA tournament, where they advanced to the second round before falling to the Michigan Wolverines by a score of 64–63.

== Previous season ==
The Cougars finished the 2016–17 season 21–11, 12–6 in AAC play to finish in third place. They lost to UConn in the quarterfinals of the AAC tournament. They received an at-large bid to the National Invitation Tournament as a No. 2 seed and lost in the first round to Akron.

== Offseason ==
=== Departures ===
Name	Number	Pos.	Height	Weight	Year	Hometown	Reason for departure
Danrad Knowles	0	F	6'10"	200	RS Senior	Nassau, Bahamas	Graduated
Xavier Dupree	1	F	6'9"	210	Senior	Houston, TX	Graduated
Morris Dunnigan	5	G	6'3"	195	Junior	Joliet, IL	Transferred
Bertrand Nkali	13	C	6'9"	235	RS Senior	Bertoua, Cameroon	Graduated
Damyean Dotson	21	G	6'5"	210	RS Senior	Houston, TX	Graduated
Kyle Meyer	33	C	6'10"	230	RS Senior	Atlanta, GA	Graduated

=== Incoming transfers ===
Name	Number	Pos.	Height	Weight	Year	Hometown	Previous School
Corey Davis Jr.	5	G	6'2"	175	Junior	Lafayette, LA	Junior college transferred from San Jacinto College
Nura Zanna	13	F	6'7"	240	RS Senior	Kaduna, Nigeria	Transferred from LIU Brooklyn. Will be eligible to play since Zanna graduated from LIU Brooklyn.
Gabe Grant	20	F	6'6"	220	Junior	Chicago, IL	Junior college transferred from Three Rivers CC
Breaon Brady	24	F	6'8"	230	Junior	Akron, OH	Junior college transferred from Saddleback College

=== Class of 2017 signees ===
College recruiting information
Name	Hometown	School	Height	Weight	Commit date
Fabian White Jr. #25 PF	Humble, TX	Atascocita High School	6 ft 8 in (2.03 m)	210 lb (95 kg)	Sep 11, 2016
Fabian White Jr. #25 PF	Recruit ratings: Scout: Rivals: (82)				
Michael Adewunmi; SG	Mansfield, TX	Lake Ridge High School	6 ft 4 in (1.93 m)	190 lb (86 kg)	Aug 1, 2016
Michael Adewunmi; SG	Recruit ratings: Scout: Rivals: (NR)				
Cedric Alley; PF	Houston, TX	Klein Forest High School	6 ft 8 in (2.03 m)	215 lb (98 kg)	Apr 1, 2017
Cedric Alley; PF	Recruit ratings: Scout: Rivals: (NR)				
Overall recruit ranking: Scout: NR Rivals: NR ESPN: NR
Note: In many cases, Scout, Rivals, 247Sports, On3, and ESPN may conflict in their listings of height and weight.; In these cases, the average was taken. ESPN grades are on a 100-point scale.; Sources: "Houston Basketball Commitment List". Rivals.; "2017 Houston Basketball Commitment List". Scout.; "ESPN". ESPN.; "Scout.com Team Recruiting Rankings". Scout.; "2017 Team Ranking". Rivals.

=== Class of 2018 signees ===
College recruiting information (2018)
Name	Hometown	School	Height	Weight	Commit date
Nate Hinton #24 SF	Gastonia, NC	Gaston Day School	6 ft 6 in (1.98 m)	198 lb (90 kg)	Sep 18, 2017
Nate Hinton #24 SF	Recruit ratings: Scout: Rivals: (82)				
Antoine Davis #43 SG	Humble, TX	Homeschool Christian Youth Association	6 ft 0 in (1.83 m)	N/A	Aug 16, 2017
Antoine Davis #43 SG	Recruit ratings: Scout: Rivals: (78)				
Overall recruit ranking: Scout: NR Rivals: NR ESPN: NR
Note: In many cases, Scout, Rivals, 247Sports, On3, and ESPN may conflict in their listings of height and weight.; In these cases, the average was taken. ESPN grades are on a 100-point scale.; Sources: "Houston Basketball Commitment List". Rivals.; "2018 Houston Basketball Commitment List". Scout.; "ESPN". ESPN.; "Scout.com Team Recruiting Rankings". Scout.; "2018 Team Ranking". Rivals.

== Roster ==
2017–18 Houston Cougars men's basketball team
Players
Coaches

Pos.	#	Name	Height	Weight	Year	Previous school	Hometown
C	1	Chris Harris Jr.	6 ft 10 in (2.08 m)	240 lb (109 kg)	RS So	San Jacinto High School	Houston, Texas
G	2	Mike Adewunmi	6 ft 4 in (1.93 m)	210 lb (95 kg)	Fr	Lake Ridge High School	Mansfield, Texas
G	3	Armoni Brooks	6 ft 4 in (1.93 m)	185 lb (84 kg)	So	McNeil High School	Round Rock, Texas
G	5	Corey Davis Jr.	6 ft 1 in (1.85 m)	190 lb (86 kg)	Jr	San Jacinto College	Lafayette, Louisiana
G	12	Wes VanBeck (W)	6 ft 3 in (1.91 m)	195 lb (88 kg)	Sr	Westside High School	Houston, Texas
F	13	Nura Zanna	6 ft 6 in (1.98 m)	240 lb (109 kg)	RS Sr	LIU Brooklyn	Kaduna, Nigeria
F	15	Devin Davis	6 ft 6 in (1.98 m)	225 lb (102 kg)	RS Sr	Odessa College	Indianapolis, Indiana
F	20	Gabe Grant	6 ft 4 in (1.93 m)	220 lb (100 kg)	Jr	Three Rivers Community College	Chicago, Illinois
F	23	Cedrick Alley Jr.	6 ft 5 in (1.96 m)	235 lb (107 kg)	Fr	Klein Forest High School	Houston, Texas
F	24	Breaon Brady	6 ft 8 in (2.03 m)	250 lb (113 kg)	Jr	Saddleback College	Akron, Ohio
G	25	Galen Robinson Jr.	6 ft 1 in (1.85 m)	190 lb (86 kg)	Jr	Westbury Christian School	Houston, Texas
C	30	Caleb Broodo (W)	6 ft 8 in (2.03 m)	210 lb (95 kg)	Fr	Dow High School	Midland, Michigan
C	31	Valentine Sangoyomi	6 ft 8 in (2.03 m)	240 lb (109 kg)	RS Jr	Northern Oklahoma College	Lagos, Nigeria
G	32	Rob Gray	6 ft 1 in (1.85 m)	185 lb (84 kg)	RS Sr	Howard College	Forest City, North Carolina
F	35	Fabian White Jr.	6 ft 7 in (2.01 m)	210 lb (95 kg)	Fr	Atascocita High School	Atascocita, Texas

Head coach

- Kelvin Sampson (UNC Pembroke)

Assistant coach(es)

- Alvin Brooks (Lamar)
- Kellen Sampson (Oklahoma)
- Quannas White (Oklahoma)

Legend

- (C) Team captain
- (S) Suspended
- (I) Ineligible
- (W) Walk-on
- Injured
- Current redshirt

Roster

== Schedule and results ==
Date time, TV	Rank^{#}	Opponent^{#}	Result	Record	High points	High rebounds	High assists	Site (attendance) city, state
Exhibition
October 21, 2017*; 12:00 pm		at Baylor; Hurricane Harvey Relief Exhibition	W 81–78		25 – Gray	6 – White	11 – Gray	Ferrell Center (2,551); Waco, TX
November 5, 2017*; 3:00 pm		Angelo State	W 97–80		13 – Harris/Zanna	9 – White	5 – C. Davis/Gray	H&PE Arena; Houston, TX
Non-conference regular season
November 10, 2017*; 7:00 pm, ESPN3		McNeese State	W 81–53	1–0	22 – Brooks	10 – Brady	5 – C. Davis/D. Davis/Robinson	H&PE Arena (3,241); Houston, TX
November 17, 2017*; 2:30 pm, FloHoops		vs. Drexel; Paradise Jam quarterfinals	L 80–84	1–1	37 – Gray	9 – Zanna	5 – Robinson	Vines Center (1,022); Lynchburg, VA
November 18, 2017*; 11:00 am, FloHoops		vs. Liberty; Paradise Jam	W 68–66	2–1	19 – Gray	11 – Brady	3 – Gray	Vines Center (815); Lynchburg, VA
November 19, 2017*; 1:30 p.m., FloHoops		vs. Wake Forest; Paradise Jam	W 78–73	3–1	23 – Gray	11 – Zanna	5 – Robinson	Vines Center (655); Lynchburg, VA
November 25, 2017*; 7:00 pm		Incarnate Word	W 97–58	4–1	16 – Gray/VanBeck	12 – White	7 – C. Davis	H&PE Arena (2,724); Houston, TX
November 29, 2017*; 7:00 pm		New Orleans	W 75–66	5–1	23 – Gray	6 – D. Davis/White	8 – Gray	H&PE Arena (2,586); Houston, TX
December 2, 2017*; 6:30 pm, CBSSN		Arkansas	W 91–65	6–1	28 – D. Davis	10 – D. Davis	9 – Robinson	H&PE Arena (4,186); Houston, TX
December 6, 2017*; 11:00 am, ESPN3		Fairfield	W 88–66	7–1	20 – Gray	9 – D. Davis	4 – Robinson	H&PE Arena (3,548); Houston, TX
December 9, 2017*; 7:00 pm, Stadium		at Saint Louis	W 77–58	8–1	24 – Gray	6 – Brady/Gray	2 – VanBeck	Chaifetz Arena (6,014); St. Louis, MO
December 13, 2017*; 7:00 pm, SECN		at LSU	L 77–80	8–2	20 – C. Davis/Gray	7 – D. Davis	7 – Gray	Maravich Center (8,449); Baton Rouge, LA
December 17, 2017*; 3:00 pm		Prairie View A&M	W 92–72	9–2	24 – Brooks	7 – D. Davis	6 – Robinson	H&PE Arena (2,788); Houston, TX
December 20, 2017*; 6:00 pm, ESPNU		vs. Providence; Hall of Fame Holiday Showcase	W 70–59	10–2	24 – Gray	9 – D. Davis	6 – Robinson	Mohegan Sun Arena (5,518); Uncasville, CT
AAC regular season
December 28, 2017; 6:00 pm, ESPNews		at South Florida	W 79–60	11–2 (1–0)	15 – C. Davis	8 – Brady	5 – Robinson	USF Sun Dome (2,273); Tampa, FL
December 30, 2017; 5:00 pm, ESPNU		Temple	W 76–73	12–2 (2–0)	21 – Brady	9 – Brady	3 – C. Davis/Gray/Robinson	H&PE Arena (3,370); Houston, TX
January 4, 2018; 6:00 pm, ESPN		at No. 9 Wichita State	L 63–81	12–3 (2–1)	13 – Gray	6 – Sangoyomi/VanBeck	5 – C. Davis	Charles Koch Arena (10,506); Wichita, KS
January 11, 2018; 6:00 pm, ESPNU		Tulsa	W 104–71	13–3 (3–1)	34 – Gray	8 – D. Davis	8 – Gray	H&PE Arena (2,666); Houston, TX
January 14, 2018; 1:00 pm, ESPN3		at East Carolina	W 65–49	14–3 (4–1)	20 – C. Davis	6 – VanBeck/White	9 – Gray	Williams Arena (3,549); Greenville, NC
January 17, 2018; 7:00 pm, ESPNews		at Tulane	L 72–81	14–4 (4–2)	24 – Gray	7 – VanBeck	5 – Gray	Devlin Fieldhouse (2,301); New Orleans, LA
January 20, 2018; 11:00 am, ESPNU		No. 7 Wichita State	W 73–59	15–4 (5–2)	24 – Gray	8 – C. Davis	4 – Gray	H&PE Arena (5,708); Houston, TX
January 28, 2018; 2:00 pm, ESPN3		South Florida	W 63–40	16–4 (6–2)	17 – C. Davis	11 – White	6 – Gray	H&PE Arena (3,121); Houston, TX
January 31, 2018; 6:00 pm, CBSSN		at No. 8 Cincinnati	L 70–80	16–5 (6–3)	18 – C. Davis	9 – D. Davis	6 – Gray	BB&T Arena (8,885); Highland Heights, KY
February 3, 2018; 11:00 am, ESPNU		at UCF	W 69–65	17–5 (7–3)	20 – Gray	9 – Brady	5 – Gray	CFE Arena (4,301); Orlando, FL
February 8, 2018; 8:00 pm, ESPN2		SMU	W 67–58	18–5 (8–3)	23 – Brooks	10 – Brooks	7 – Gray	H&PE Arena (3,547); Houston, TX
February 11, 2018; 5:00 pm, ESPNU		Tulane	W 73–42	19–5 (9–3)	16 – D. Davis	11 – Brooks	5 – Robinson	H&PE Arena (2,902); Houston, TX
February 15, 2018; 6:00 pm, CBSSN		No. 5 Cincinnati	W 67–62	20–5 (10–3)	16 – C. Davis/D. Davis	10 – D. Davis	6 – Robinson	H&PE Arena (5,363); Houston, TX
February 18, 2018; 3:00 pm, CBSSN		at Temple	W 80–59	21–5 (11–3)	20 – C. Davis	11 – D. Davis	7 – Robinson	Liacouras Center (7,270); Philadelphia, PA
February 22, 2018; 8:00 pm, CBSSN	No. 23	at Memphis	L 85–91	21–6 (11–4)	30 – Gray	9 – Brady	7 – Gray	FedEx Forum (6,536); Memphis, TN
February 25, 2018; 2:00 pm, ESPN3	No. 23	East Carolina	W 109–58	22–6 (12–4)	21 – Brooks	9 – White	11 – Gray	H&PE Arena (3,602); Houston, TX
February 28, 2018; 8:00 pm, ESPN2	No. 25	at SMU	W 69–56	23–6 (13–4)	19 – Gray	7 – Brooks	9 – Gray	Moody Coliseum (6,782); Dallas, TX
March 4, 2018; 3:00 pm, CBSSN	No. 25	UConn	W 81–71	24–6 (14–4)	30 – Gray	8 – D. Davis	4 – Robinson	H&PE Arena (5,237); Houston, TX
AAC Tournament
March 9, 2018; 8:00 pm, ESPNU	(3) No. 21	vs. (6) UCF; Quarterfinals	W 84–56	25–6	18 – Robinson	7 – D. Davis/White	6 – Gray	Amway Center (8,680); Orlando, FL
March 10, 2018; 2:30 pm, CBS	(3) No. 21	vs. (2) No. 11 Wichita State; Semifinals	W 77–74	26–6	33 – Gray	9 – Zanna	6 – Robinson	Amway Center (8,644); Orlando, FL
March 11, 2018; 2:30 pm, CBS	(3) No. 21	vs. (1) No. 8 Cincinnati; Championship	L 55–56	26–7	17 – Gray	6 – Zanna	5 – Robinson	Amway Center (8,670); Orlando, FL
NCAA tournament
March 15, 2018*; 6:40 pm, TBS	(6 W) No. 21	vs. (11 W) San Diego State; First Round	W 67–65	27–7	39 – Gray	9 – D. Davis	2 – C. Davis/Robinson	Intrust Bank Arena (14,019); Wichita, KS
March 17, 2018*; 9:02 pm, TBS	(6 W) No. 21	vs. (3 W) No. 7 Michigan; Second Round	L 63–64	27–8	23 – Gray	10 – Gray	3 – Gray/Robinson	Intrust Bank Arena (14,385); Wichita, KS
*Non-conference game. ^{#}Rankings from AP Poll. (#) Tournament seedings in parentheses. W=West. All times are in Central Time.

== Rankings ==
Ranking movements Legend: ██ Increase in ranking ██ Decrease in ranking — = Not ranked RV = Received votes
	Week																			
Poll	Pre	1	2	3	4	5	6	7	8	9	10	11	12	13	14	15	16	17	18	Final
AP	—	—	—	—	RV	—	—	—	—	—	—	RV	RV	RV	RV	23	25	21	21	Not released
Coaches	—	—^	—	—	—	RV	—	—	—	—	—	—	RV	RV	RV	23	RV	21	19	22

^Coaches Poll did not release a Week 2 poll at the same time AP did.
*AP does not release post-NCAA tournament rankings.
