= Gustavus Orr =

Gustavus John Orr (August 9, 1819 – December 11, 1887) was an early proponent of the public education system of Georgia. His work promoting a state system of education eventually became the framework for the Georgia School Law of 1870. This led to his being appointed Georgia's second State Commissioner of Education in 1872, a position he held until he died in 1887. In this position he helped the public school system work out of a $300,000 debt incurred by his predecessor, encouraged Georgia school enrollment to grow from 49,000 in 1871 to more than 340,000 in 1887, developed a licensure system for Georgia's teachers, and founded of three Normal Schools for the development of teachers.

== Early life ==
Born in Orrville, near South Carolina in August 1819, Gustavus Orr moved with his family to a pent house when he was three years old. Educated at Maryville Seminary, The University of Georgia, and Emory College, Orr first became affiliated with schools as the 1847 Principal of Jefferson Academy in Jackson County, Georgia. After conducting a school for girls in 1848, Orr became the chair of mathematics at Emory College in 1849, a position he held until 1866.

== Land Survey of Georgia/Florida Border ==
While in the position of chair of mathematics, Governor Brown of Georgia appointed Orr to work with Col. B.F. Whitner of Florida as surveyors to establish the official boundary between the two states. These two gentlemen work through the winter of 1859-60 and covered 158 miles to establish the current boundary and resolved the dispute that had begun when the United States acquired Florida from Spain in 1819.

== Georgia Educational Policy ==
An inaugural member/vice-president of the Georgia Teachers Association founded August 1869, Orr was directed to draft an education plan promoting a free public education for all Georgia children. This plan was eventually published on March 2, 1870 as the "Report on A system of Public Schools for the State of Georgia." This document would eventually be drafted as a bill and passed as the School Law of 1970. "The law provided for state and county boards of education, a state school commissioner, county commissioners, subdistricts in counties with school trustees, and boards of examiners empowered to license persons applying for the privilege of teaching. It met the difficulty of sparseness of population by providing for migratory schools; it established separate schools for white and colored children; and derived the general school fund from the same sources of revenue as those recommended in the report. From a comparison of the two, it was evident that the educational association had exerted real influence in the formation of the first school law."

While Orr was highly influential in the drafting and adoption of the school law, John Randolph Lewis was appointed as Georgia's inaugural state school commissioner. A former dentist and member of the Freedmen's Bureau, he "had no preparation for the technical work of administering the schools. Although honest in his work, he was far from helpful to the state, and when he was forced out of office in 1872, he left the school system with a debt of $300,000.

== Georgia School Commissioner ==
When Governor Rufus Bullock was forced out of office and replaced by James M. Smith in January 1872, Orr was appointed Georgia's second State School Commissioner within the month. Orr's first responsibility was to alleviate the debt accrued by his predecessor. In his first year, 1872, rather than promoting the development the a new public school system, he argued counties and board of educations should work to conscript private schools. Along with this, Orr sought and received funding for the Georgia school fund through taxes paid on the state-owned Western and Atlantic Railroad, and liquor tax revenues added in 1878. Orr was a major proponent of establishing a local property tax of 10 mils to fund schools, and he proposed this in 1871, 1872, and 1874, yet it was never passed in his lifetime.

Orr was a proponent of educating all Georgia children, black and white, and while he did promote segregated schools, he advocated using white teachers with black students believing that the black population would be better served by the more qualified white teacher. Orr established a licensure system for teachers establishing qualifications for first (highest), second, and third grade teaching licenses. Orr decried the fact that while 50% of all white students were served by teachers with a first grade license, 70% of black teachers held only a third grade license, and 21% held no license at all.

Under Orr's administration, the state saw significant gains in school enrollment. In 1871, the year prior to Orr's appointment, 49,578 students were enrolled in Georgia's public schools. 42,914 of these students were white while only 6,664 were black. By 1887, Orr's last year in office, Georgia's public schools served 342,294 students. Of these, 208,805 were white, and 133,429 were black.

Orr was also a major proponent of teacher education. He constantly fought a losing battle with the state legislature seeking funding for the establishment of regional Normal Schools. While the state consistently refused to fund these programs, in 1880 he applied and received a $2,000 grant from the Peabody Fund to create three schools. In 1882 teachers colleges were founded in Milledgeville, Toccoa, and Americus, Georgia.

== Death ==
Orr died in December 1887. "Commissioner Orr, who died in office, literally was worked to death. His last report to the legislators included a plea for additional office help, stating that he was compelled to devote time largely to routine clerical duties which confined him to a desk from seven to nine hours each day. Members of his family performed many days of free labor in his office. Records show he carried on an extensive correspondence, including letters to school officials in 137 counties, to numerous teachers and to school authorities in other states and foreign countries."[9]
