= Trentyn Flowers =

American basketball player (born 2005)

No. 9 – BC Roma
- Position: Small forward / power forward
- League: LBA; EuroCup

Personal information
- Born: March 8, 2005 (age 21) Towson, Maryland, U.S.
- Listed height: 6 ft 9 in (2.06 m)
- Listed weight: 185 lb (84 kg)

Career information
- High school: Jackson County Comprehensive (Jefferson, Georgia); Huntington Prep (Huntington, West Virginia); Sierra Canyon (Los Angeles, California); Combine Academy (Lincolnton, North Carolina)
- NBA draft: 2024: undrafted
- Playing career: 2023–present

Career history
- 2023–2024: Adelaide 36ers
- 2024–2025: Los Angeles Clippers
- 2024–2025: →San Diego Clippers
- 2025–2026: Chicago Bulls
- 2025–2026: →Windy City Bulls
- 2026: Brampton Honey Badgers
- 2026–present: BC Roma
- Stats at NBA.com
- Stats at Basketball Reference

Trentyn Levi Flowers (born March 8, 2005) is an American professional basketball player for BC Roma of the Lega Basket Serie A (LBA) and the EuroCup.

== High school career ==
Flowers played his freshman season at Jackson County Comprehensive High School in Jefferson, Georgia, where he received his first NCAA Division I basketball scholarship offer in 2021. He moved to Huntington Prep School in Huntington, West Virginia, for his sophomore season and garnered continued collegiate attention for his ball-handling skills and "big guard" playing style. Flowers transferred to Sierra Canyon School in Los Angeles, California, midway through his sophomore season. He transferred to Combine Academy in Lincolnton, North Carolina, in 2022.

Flowers was considered as a top-10 small forward in the class of 2024. On March 17, 2023, he declared his commitment to join the Louisville Cardinals and would reclassify to the class of 2023 to be eligible for the 2023–24 season.

== Professional career ==
=== Adelaide 36ers (2023–2024) ===
On August 14, 2023, Flowers announced that he had decommitted from Louisville to sign with the Adelaide 36ers of the National Basketball League (NBL) as a member of the league's Next Stars program. He stated that he wanted to play at the point guard position and named former NBL players LaMelo Ball and Josh Giddey as motivations. On August 27, 36ers head coach C. J. Bruton named Flowers as the starting point guard for the team. After attempts at using Flowers as a point guard to begin the preseason, the 36ers moved him to a wing forward position. Flowers made his debut off the bench in a loss to the Brisbane Bullets on September 29, 2023, and recorded four points and five rebounds. He scored 23 points, including 18 in the fourth quarter, to lead the 36ers to their first win of the season against the Illawarra Hawks on October 14, 2023. Flowers returned to the 36ers' starting line-up after Scott Ninnis took over as head coach from Bruton in December 2023. He injured his knee in January 2024, and subsequently fell out of the playing rotation. Flowers then suffered from a neck strain, and missed the last two rounds of the season. Flowers appeared in 18 games with the 36ers and averaged 5.2 points per game.

=== Los Angeles / San Diego Clippers (2024–2025) ===
On April 14, 2024, Flowers declared for the 2024 NBA draft. He was invited to participate in the NBA draft combine. After going unselected in the draft, Flowers signed a two-way contract with the Los Angeles Clippers and their NBA G League affiliate San Diego Clippers on July 25. On September 25, he was ruled out of participating in Clippers training camp after he underwent surgery on his left wrist. Flowers appeared in six games for the Clippers during the 2024–25 season and averaged 1.8 points per game. He spent the majority of the season with the San Diego Clippers in the NBA G League where he averaged 17.7 points, 5.0 rebounds and 2.0 assists in 40 games.

On October 14, 2025, Flowers was waived by Los Angeles.

=== Chicago / Windy City Bulls (2025–2026) ===
On October 17, 2025, Flowers signed a two-way contract with the Chicago Bulls. He made two appearances for the Bulls, recording averages of 2.0 points, 0.5 rebounds, and 0.5 assists. Flowers was waived by Chicago on January 6, 2026.

=== Brampton Honey Badgers ===
On July 1, 2026, Flowers signed with the Brampton Honey Badgers of the Canadian Elite Basketball League. He made his Brampton debut the following day, scoring 22 points in an 81–76 victory over the Ottawa BlackJacks.

== Career statistics ==
Legend
GP	Games played	GS	Games started	MPG	Minutes per game
FG%	Field goal percentage	3P%	3-point field goal percentage	FT%	Free throw percentage
RPG	Rebounds per game	APG	Assists per game	SPG	Steals per game
BPG	Blocks per game	PPG	Points per game	**Bold**	Career high

=== NBA ===
Year	Team	GP	GS	MPG	FG%	3P%	FT%	RPG	APG	SPG	BPG	PPG
2024–25	L.A. Clippers	**6**	0	**4.5**	.364	.000	1.000	**.7**	.0	.0	.0	1.8
2025–26	Chicago	2	0	3.0	**.667**	.000	—	.5	**.5**	.0	.0	**2.0**
Career		8	0	4.1	.429	.000	1.000	.6	.1	.0	.0	1.9

== Personal life ==
Flowers was born in Maryland and raised in Georgia. His father, Travis Flowers, played professional basketball overseas.
