= Paul Watson (basketball) =

American basketball player (born 1994)

- Watson with BC Roma in 2026

No. 3 – BC Roma
- Position: Small forward / shooting guard
- League: LBA; EuroCup

Personal information
- Born: December 30, 1994 (age 31) Phoenix, Arizona, U.S.
- Listed height: 6 ft 6 in (1.98 m)
- Listed weight: 210 lb (95 kg)

Career information
- High school: Paradise Valley (Phoenix, Arizona)
- College: Fresno State (2013–2017)
- NBA draft: 2017: undrafted
- Playing career: 2017–present

Career history
- 2017: BG Göttingen
- 2017–2019: Westchester Knicks
- 2019–2020: Raptors 905
- 2020: Atlanta Hawks
- 2020–2021: Toronto Raptors
- 2020: →Raptors 905
- 2021–2022: Oklahoma City Thunder
- 2021–2022: →Oklahoma City Blue
- 2023–2024: Austin Spurs
- 2024–2025: Valley Suns
- 2025–2026: Memphis Hustle
- 2026–present: BC Roma

Career highlights
- Mountain West Freshman of the Year (2014)
- Stats at NBA.com
- Stats at Basketball Reference

Paul Watson Jr. (born December 30, 1994) is an American professional basketball player for BC Roma of the Lega Basket Serie A (LBA) and the EuroCup. He played college basketball for the Fresno State Bulldogs.

== High school career ==
Watson attended Paradise Valley High School in Phoenix, Arizona. He led the team to a state championship and was named Most Valuable Player.

== College career ==
Watson was selected as the Mountain West Conference Freshman of the Year in 2014 after averaging 10 points and 4.7 rebounds per game. As a junior, he was sidelined with an ankle injury in the last three games of the regular season which limited his minutes. He helped the Bulldogs reach the NCAA Tournament for the first time since 2001 that year. Watson posted 7.7 points per game as a junior. As a senior, he averaged 11.4 points, 5.2 rebound and 1.4 assists per game and made 33 starts. Watson participated in the College Basketball Slam Dunk competition in 2017.

== Professional career ==
=== BG Göttingen (2017) ===
Prior to the 2017 NBA draft, Watson worked out with the Phoenix Suns. After going undrafted in the draft, Watson joined the Toronto Raptors for the Las Vegas Summer League and averaged 4 points per game in five games.

Watson signed with BG Göttingen of the German Basketball Bundesliga in August 2017. However, he was released by the club in October after appearing in one game and scoring six points and grabbing two rebounds.

=== Westchester Knicks (2017–2019) ===
Watson was selected with the fifth pick in the first round of the 2017 NBA G League draft by the Westchester Knicks and signed with the team. He averaged 6.2 points and 3.4 rebounds per game in his first season with the Knicks. Watson signed a deal with the New York Knicks on October 5, 2018, but was waived two days later. He was added to the Westchester Knicks training camp roster.

=== Raptors 905 (2019–2020) ===
For the 2019–20 season, the Raptors 905 acquired Watson's returning player rights from Westchester. He averaged 18.4 points and 7.4 rebounds per game, making 13 starts.

=== Atlanta Hawks (2020) ===
On January 6, 2020, the Atlanta Hawks announced that they had signed Watson to 10-day contract. On January 15, 2020, the Atlanta Hawks announced that they had released Watson.

=== Toronto Raptors (2020–2021) ===
Watson was signed to a two-way deal with the Toronto Raptors on January 15, 2020.

On August 14, 2020, Watson had an NBA career high 27 minutes, 22 points and six rebounds coming off the bench to lead the Raptors to a 117–109 win in their final regular season game in the NBA Restart Season against the Denver Nuggets.

On December 19, 2020, Watson got converted from a two-way contract to a multi-year contract.

On April 16, 2021, Watson scored a career-high with 30 points and 8 made threes, leading the Raptors to a 113–102 victory against the Orlando Magic. On August 3, he was waived by the Raptors.

=== Oklahoma City Thunder (2021–2022) ===
On September 15, 2021, Watson signed with the Oklahoma City Thunder, on a two-way contract with the Oklahoma City Blue.

On December 29, 2021, Watson played a career-high 37 minutes in a 115–97 loss to the Phoenix Suns. On February 10, 2022, Watson was released by the Thunder.

=== Austin Spurs (2023–2024) ===
On October 10, 2023, Watson signed with the San Antonio Spurs, but was waived two days later. On October 31, he joined the Austin Spurs.

=== Valley Suns (2024–2025) ===
On October 16, 2024, Watson signed with the Phoenix Suns, but was waived the next day. On October 27, he joined the Valley Suns.

== Career statistics ==
=== NBA ===
==== Regular season ====
Year	Team	GP	GS	MPG	FG%	3P%	FT%	RPG	APG	SPG	BPG	PPG
2019–20	Atlanta	2	0	8.5	.000	.000	–	1.0	1.5	.5	.0	.0
2019–20	Toronto	8	0	8.8	.526	.444	.778	1.9	.6	.4	.1	3.9
2020–21	Toronto	27	2	11.0	.463	.469	.625	1.7	.6	.2	.1	4.1
2021–22	Oklahoma	9	3	17.3	.343	.231	.500	3.0	.9	.3	.3	3.4
Career		46	5	11.7	.420	.392	.684	1.9	.7	.3	.2	3.8

==== Playoffs ====
Year	Team	GP	GS	MPG	FG%	3P%	FT%	RPG	APG	SPG	BPG	PPG
2019–20	Toronto	2	0	4.5	.500	–	–	.0	.5	.5	.0	1.0
