= Jefferson, Georgia =

- City
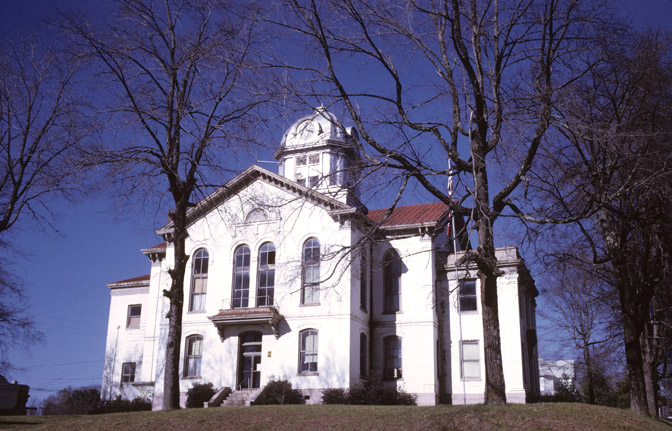
- Jackson County Courthouse in Jefferson

- Seal

- Location in Jackson County and the state of Georgia
- Coordinates: 34°7′36″N 83°35′25″W
- Country: United States
- State: Georgia
- County: Jackson
- Named for: Thomas Jefferson

Government
  - Type: Local government
  - Mayor: Dawn Maddox
  - City manager: Priscilla Murphy
  - City council: Steve Kinney (D1); Annette Studivant (D2); Cody Cain (D3); Mark Mobley (D4); Alex Crawford (D5)

Area
  - Total: 22.87 sq mi (59.23 km^{2})
  - Land: 22.53 sq mi (58.36 km^{2})
  - Water: 0.34 sq mi (0.88 km^{2})
- Elevation: 751 ft (229 m)

Population (2020)
  - Total: 13,233
  - Density: 587.3/sq mi (226.77/km^{2})
- Time zone: UTC-5 (Eastern (EST))
  - Summer (DST): UTC-4 (EDT)
- ZIP code: 30549
- Area code: 706
- FIPS code: 13-41988
- GNIS feature ID: 0356332
- Website: https://www.jeffersonga.gov/

Jefferson is a city and the county seat of Jackson County, Georgia, United States. The population was 13,233 at the 2020 census, up from 9,432 at the 2010 census. As of 2024 the estimated population was 16,459.

== History ==
Jefferson was founded in 1800. That same year, the seat of Jackson County was transferred to Jefferson from Clarkesboro. Jefferson was incorporated as a town in 1806 and as a city in 1896. The city was named after Thomas Jefferson.

== Geography ==
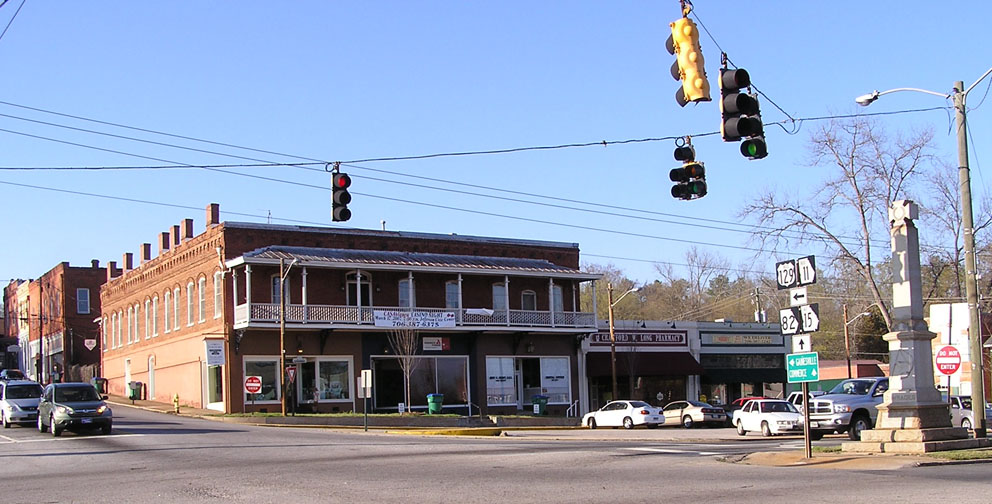
View of the north side of the city's central square

Jefferson is located in central Jackson County at 34°7′36″N 83°35′25″W (34.126736, -83.590297). It is bordered to the northwest by Pendergrass and to the southeast by Arcade. U.S. Route 129 passes through the southwest side of the city, leading northwest 21 miles (34 km) to Gainesville and southeast 19 miles (31 km) to Athens. Interstate 85 runs through the northern end of Jefferson, 5 miles (8 km) northwest of the center of town, with access from Exits 137 and 140. I-85 leads southwest 55 miles (89 km) to Atlanta and northeast 90 miles (140 km) to Greenville, South Carolina.

According to the United States Census Bureau, Jefferson has a total area of 22.0 square miles (57.0 km^{2}), of which 21.7 square miles (56.1 km^{2}) are land and 0.3 square miles (0.9 km^{2}), or 1.53%, are water. Curry Creek, a tributary of the North Oconee River, flows just to the east of downtown, and the Middle Oconee River runs along the western edge of the city.

== Demographics ==
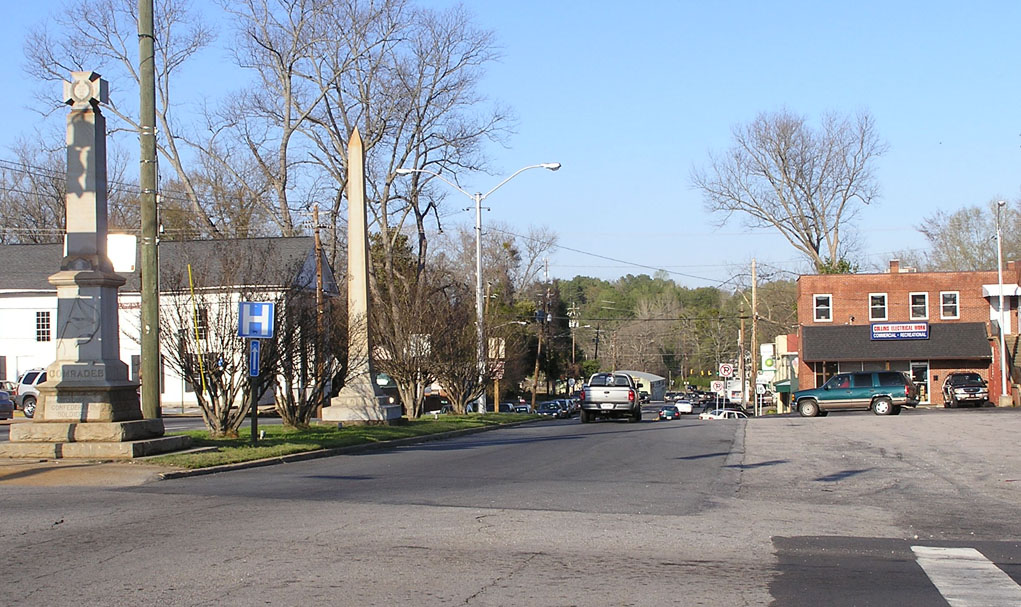
View towards the east side of the square showing the Confederate Memorial and the highway leading to Commerce, Georgia

Historical population
Census	Pop.	Note	%±
1880	419		—
1890	540		28.9%
1900	726		34.4%
1910	1,207		66.3%
1920	1,626		34.7%
1930	1,869		14.9%
1940	1,839		−1.6%
1950	2,040		10.9%
1960	1,746		−14.4%
1970	1,647		−5.7%
1980	1,820		10.5%
1990	2,763		51.8%
2000	3,825		38.4%
2010	9,432		146.6%
2020	13,233		40.3%
2025 (est.)	17,185	▲	29.9%
U.S. Decennial Census; 2025

=== 2020 census ===
As of the 2020 census, Jefferson had a population of 13,233. The median age was 34.5 years. 32.0% of residents were under the age of 18 and 12.0% of residents were 65 years of age or older. For every 100 females there were 94.3 males, and for every 100 females age 18 and over there were 89.1 males age 18 and over.

75.0% of residents lived in urban areas, while 25.0% lived in rural areas.

There were 4,324 households in Jefferson, including 2,885 family households. Of all households, 50.4% had children under the age of 18 living in them, 61.5% were married-couple households, 11.5% were households with a male householder and no spouse or partner present, and 22.1% were households with a female householder and no spouse or partner present. About 17.4% of all households were made up of individuals and 8.3% had someone living alone who was 65 years of age or older.

There were 4,477 housing units, of which 3.4% were vacant. The homeowner vacancy rate was 1.2% and the rental vacancy rate was 4.5%.

Jefferson racial composition as of 2020
Race	Num.	Perc.
White (non-Hispanic)	10,240	77.38%
Black or African American (non-Hispanic)	1,087	8.21%
Native American	22	0.17%
Asian	269	2.03%
Pacific Islander	3	0.02%
Other/mixed	572	4.32%
Hispanic or Latino	1,040	7.86%

=== 2023 estimate ===
In a 2024 report, the U.S. Census Bureau estimated that Jefferson, GA was the fastest growing micropolitan statistical area in the country from 2020 to 2023. The population increased by an estimated 16.24% in that period.

== Education ==
=== Jackson County School District ===
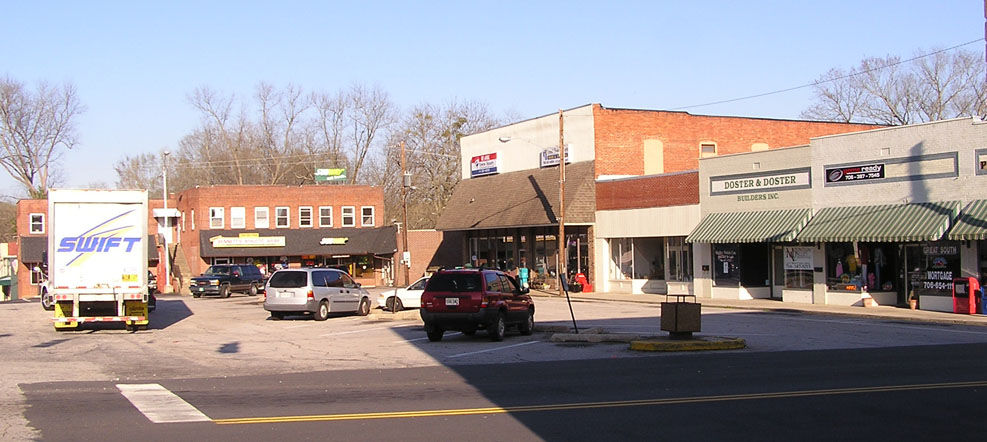
View of the southeast side of the square with shops and parking

The Jackson County School District holds pre-school to grade twelve, and consists of seven elementary schools, three middle schools, two high schools, and one charter school. As of March 2024, the district had a total of 10,646 students, not including enrollees of EMPOWER College and Career Center.

- East Jackson Elementary School
- Gum Springs Elementary School
- Maysville Elementary School
- North Jackson Elementary School
- South Jackson Elementary School
- West Jackson Elementary School
- Heroes Elementary School
- East Jackson Middle School
- West Jackson Middle School
- Legacy Knoll Middle School
- East Jackson High School
- Jackson County High School
- EMPOWER College and Career Center (charter school)

=== Jefferson City School District ===
The Jefferson City School District holds preschool to grade twelve, and consists of one preschool, two elementary schools, a middle school, and a high school. As of March 2024, the district had 4,218 students.

- Center for Early Learning
- Jefferson Elementary School
- Jefferson Academy
- Jefferson Middle School
- Jefferson High School

=== Martin Institute ===
The Martin Institute was a school in Jefferson from 1818 (Renamed to Martin Institute around December 1859) to January 13, 1942. This site was burnt down by a student who committed arson.

== Notable people ==
- Chris Beck, pitcher for the New York Mets
- Hiram Parks Bell, U.S. Representative
- Sammy Brown, linebacker for the Clemson Tigers football
- Trentyn Flowers, professional basketball player
- Damon Jesse Gause, World War II war hero
- Brantley Gilbert, country music singer, songwriter
- Crawford W. Long, physician who first used ether for surgical anesthesia
- Brandon Mosley, former Auburn University and New York Giants offensive lineman
- Corey Smith, country music singer, songwriter
- Malaki Starks, professional football player; safety for the Baltimore Ravens and formerly for the Georgia Bulldogs
