= Damon Jesse Gause =

American military officer (1915-1944)

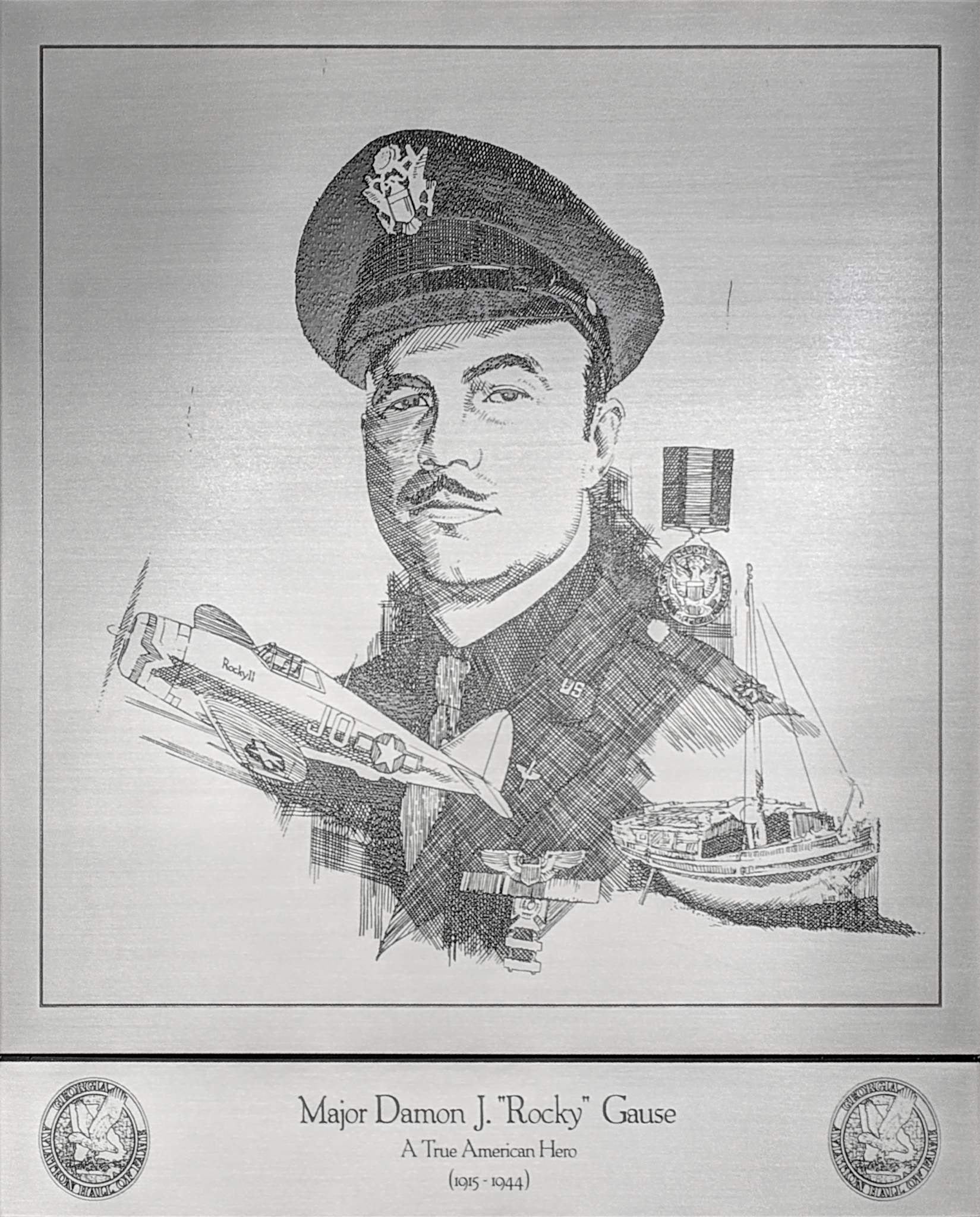
- Born: June 17, 1915; Fort Valley, Georgia, U.S.
- Died: March 9, 1944 (aged 28) Isle of Wight, England
- Branch: United States Coast Guard; United States Army; United States Army Air Corps
- Spouse: Lillian Ruth Evans Carter (m. 1941–1944)
- Children: 1

Damon Jesse Gause (June 17, 1915 – March 9, 1944) was an American military officer who served in the United States Army Air Corps. He was captured and escaped from Bataan, then Corregidor. He served with the Ninth Air Force and flew with the Hell Hawks.

== Early life and education ==
DJ Gause was born in Fort Valley, Georgia in 1915, the son of Duff Adolph Gause (1893–1965) and Jescyne W. Gause (1895–1978). The couple had two additional sons, Wilson A. Gause (1923–2006) and John Winston Gause (1925–2005).

Gause graduated from the Martin Institute High School. After high school, he attended the University of Georgia. After one year, Gause left school to join the United States Coast Guard.

== Career ==
In the United States Coast Guard, Gause was assigned to the USCG Cutter Argo (WPC-100), where his main duty was radioman. He joined the Army Air Corps to serve in Panama after three years of service in the Coast Guard.

Following a three-year stint in the Army, he went to work in the oil fields in Colombia for the Texaco Oil Company. In 1939, Gause went back to Georgia. He again enlisted in the Army Air Corps in 1941 and qualified for flight training at Kelly Field in Texas. Gause completed the training and earned his wings as an aircraft pilot and received a commission as second lieutenant. He returned to Georgia, this time at Savannah, Georgia to serve with the 27th Bombardment Group. He trained on A-24 Banshee dive-bombers.

=== Operation PLUM ===
==== Early actions and meeting Rita Garcia ====
On 8 December 1941 (Philippine time), shortly after the Japanese attacks on Pearl Harbor and the Philippines, Gause found a wounded Filipino civilian, Rita Garcia, in a Manila street during an air raid and carried her to a hospital. She later credited him with saving her life.

==== Withdrawal to Bataan ====
By 1 January 1942, Gause and survivors of the aircraft-less 27th Bombardment Group were among the last American units to evacuate Manila. His four-truck convoy escaped the city just ahead of Japanese occupation and reached the Bataan Peninsula, where approximately 80,000 American and Filipino troops plus several thousand civilians were concentrating for a last-ditch defense.

==== Defense of Bataan (January–April 1942) ====
With no aircraft available, the 27th Bombardment Group was reorganized as provisional infantry. Gause commanded a machine-gun company equipped with .30-caliber air-cooled guns originally intended for Douglas SBD Dauntless dive bombers. His unit held a 30-kilometre sector between Manila Bay and the central mountains. Troops endured constant Japanese air and artillery attacks, severe rationing (halved by late February), malaria, dysentery, and extreme heat. Soldiers resorted to eating monkeys and horses. Despite inflicting heavy Japanese casualties (estimated 15,000 killed or wounded in early January alone), Allied lines were steadily forced back.

==== Fall of Bataan and initial capture (8–9 April 1942) ====
On 9 April 1942, Japanese forces overran the final defense line – the largest surrender of U.S. troops in history. While driving with Sergeant Wilmer Baker to locate supplies, their truck was ambushed. The two leapt from a bridge into a river under machine-gun fire, hid in mud as Japanese search parties passed overhead, then infiltrated through an enemy camp at night. Baker vanished in the surf; Gause continued alone. Recaptured shortly afterward, he displayed his pilot wings hoping for officer treatment but was slapped and repeatedly bayoneted in the stomach by a guard.

==== Escape from Bataan (9–11 April 1942) ====
Marched to a clearing holding about 300 American prisoners, Gause observed Japanese guards still disorganized and focused on looting. Rejecting imprisonment and the impending Bataan Death March (in which approximately 76,000 prisoners began a 65-mile forced march under brutal conditions, with an estimated 10,000 deaths), he attacked a passing sentry from behind, strangled him, seized his knife, and fatally stabbed him. Gause fled through jungle under rifle and machine-gun fire, reached the shore, used driftwood as flotation, and swam roughly three miles across open water to Corregidor while Japanese troops fired from the beach. Exhausted and severely sunburned, he crawled ashore on 11 April 1942 and collapsed.

==== Recovery and service on Corregidor ====
Gause awoke in a hospital tended by Army nurse Mildred "Millie" Dalton, a pre-war acquaintance from Georgia. After brief recovery he returned to duty, first with the 4th Marines beach defenses and later commanding a machine-gun company of Filipino Scouts (with Lieutenant Alberto Goncalves as executive officer). From late April 1942 Corregidor endured unprecedented bombardment; on 29 April (Emperor Hirohito's birthday) the shelling reached extreme intensity using artillery, mortars, aircraft, and every available weapon. The once-lush island was reduced to a cratered wasteland. Propaganda broadcasts urged surrender. Gause and the garrison knew a Japanese landing was imminent and that Corregidor was the final Allied stronghold at the entrance to Manila Bay.

==== Later escape ====
After the fall of Corregidor on May 6, 1942, Gause became a prisoner of war once more but escaped days later alongside fellow officer Captain William Lloyd Osborne, another Bataan escapee who had also fled Corregidor. The two Americans, both veterans of the harrowing defenses on Bataan and the island fortress, commandeered a leaky 20-foot native fishing boat and set sail from the Philippines toward Australia and freedom.

The perilous 52-day odyssey covered 3,200 miles across the open Pacific, testing the limits of human endurance. Gause and Osborne battled raging typhoons that threatened to capsize their fragile vessel, evaded constant threats from Japanese patrols including ships, submarines, and aircraft that prowled the sea lanes, and rationed dwindling supplies of food and fresh water amid scorching sun and relentless storms. In a desperate bid for provisions, they made landfall at a remote leper colony on an uninhabited island, bartering for coconuts and whatever meager sustenance the afflicted inhabitants could spare, a stark encounter that underscored the isolation and ingenuity required for survival.

Their arrival in Brisbane, Australia, on July 3, 1942, marked one of the most audacious escapes of World War II. Dehydrated, emaciated, and battered by the elements, the pair staggered into the office of General Douglas MacArthur, the Supreme Commander of Allied Forces in the Southwest Pacific. Upon hearing their improbable tale, MacArthur could muster only a stunned exclamation: "Well, I'll be damned." This feat not only symbolized the unyielding spirit of the "Battling Bastards of Bataan" but also provided MacArthur with vital firsthand intelligence on Japanese dispositions in the Philippines. Gause later chronicled the entire saga, from Bataan to Brisbane, in his 1945 memoir The War Journal of Major Damon "Rocky" Gause.

- The Philippines. Gause, 2nd Lieutenant, 17th Squadron, 27th Bombardment Group, in the Philippines.
- The Great Escape of Major Gause.

=== England ===
On February 13, 1944, 1st Lieutenant Harold B. Johnston took off from Gosfield, England in a P-47 Thunderbolt for a test flight, and died when his plane crashed only nine days before the first combat mission of the Hell Hawks and the P-47s. The Hell Hawks were part of the Ninth Air Force. The combat mission occurred on February 22, 1944, with several groups taking part in an uneventful run to escort bombers. Colonel Lance Call led one group. Another group was led by Major Rockford V. Gray, with Gause as wingman. Other groups were led by Major Donald E. Hillman and Major William D. Ritchie. In preparation to support the Allied invasion of Europe, the Hell Hawks moved with the 365th Fighter Group to RAF Beaulieu, Hants, England on 5 March 1944. During a test flight on March 9, 1944, Gause was killed when his P-47 crashed near Beaulieu, England.

== Personal life ==
On October 11, 1941, Gause married Lillian Ruth Evans Carter (1921–2014) and the couple had one son Damon Gause Jr. (1943–2006). Gause was buried in the Cambridge American Cemetery and Memorial at Coton, South Cambridgeshire District, Cambridgeshire, England.

== Awards and decorations ==
- Distinguished Service Cross
- Air Medal
- American Campaign Medal
- Asiatic Pacific Campaign Medal
- European-African-Middle Eastern Campaign Medal
- World War II Victory Medal

== Accolades and honors ==
In Georgia, U.S. Highway 129 South, also known as the Major Damon Gause Bypass, is named in his honor.

== Bibliography ==
- Gause, Damon Rocky (1999). The War Journal of Major Damon "Rocky" Gause. D. L. Gause (Ed.). Hyperion Books. ISBN 0786884215
- Osborne, William L. (18 July 2013). Voyage into the Wind. CreateSpace. ISBN 1490318917
