= Commerce City School District =

School district in Georgia (U.S. state)

Address
- 270 Lakeview Drive Commerce, Georgia, 30529-2632; United States
- Coordinates: 34.199626°N 83.465096°W

District information
- Grades: Pre-kindergarten – 12
- Superintendent: Billy Kirk
- Accreditation(s): Southern Association of Colleges and Schools; Georgia Accrediting Commission

Students and staff
- Enrollment: 1,785 (2022–23)
- Faculty: 128.50 (FTE)
- Student–teacher ratio: 13.89

Other information
- Telephone: (706) 335-5500
- Fax: (833) 535-1705
- Website: commercecityschools.org

The Commerce City School District is a public school district in Jackson County, Georgia, based in the city of Commerce. It serves Commerce in Jackson County.

== Schools ==
The Commerce City School District has two elementary schools, one middle school, and one high school.

Schools

- Commerce High School
- Commerce Middle School
- Commerce Elementary School
- Commerce Primary School
