= Commerce High School (Commerce, Georgia) =

Public high school in Commerce, Georgia, United States

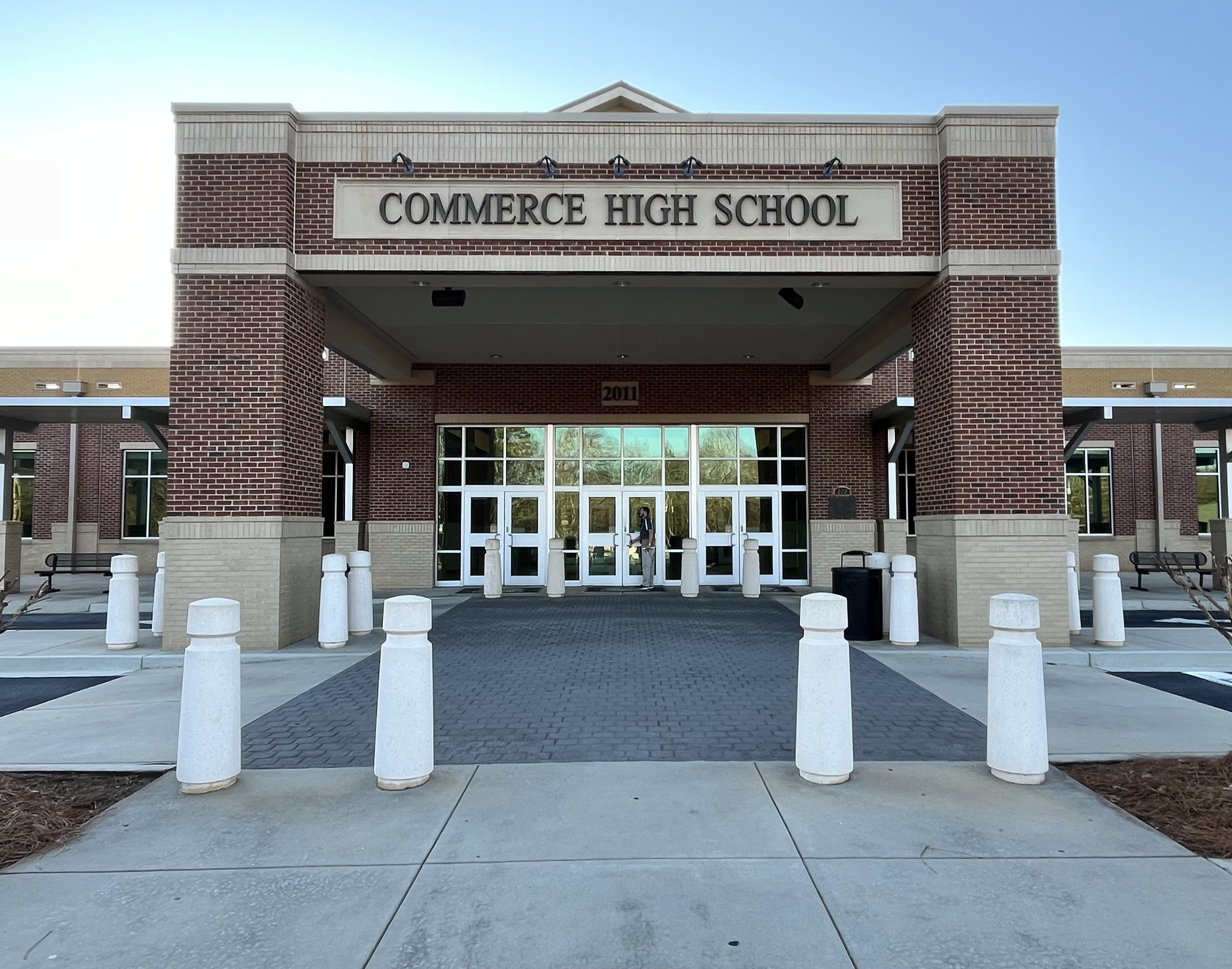
- Commerce High School in 2024

Location
- 272 Lakeview Drive; Commerce, Georgia 30529; United States; 34.1981°N 83.4643°W

Information
- Type: Public
- Established: 1955
- School district: Commerce City School District
- CEEB code: 060-515
- Principal: William Smith
- Teaching staff: 160.27 (FTE)
- Grades: 9–12
- Enrollment: 546 (2023–2024)
- Student to teacher ratio: 12.90
- Colors: Gold and black
- Nickname: Tigers
- Feeder schools: Commerce Middle School
- Website: chs.commercecityschools.org

Commerce High School is a public high school in Commerce, Georgia, United States.

== Notable alumni ==
- Benjamin Bridges, member of the Georgia House of Representatives
- Gene White, former NFL player
