= Jefferson City School District =

School district in Georgia (U.S. state)

Jefferson City Schools

Address
- 345 Storey Lane Jefferson, Georgia, 30549; United States
- Coordinates: 34.1410523°N 83.6011233°W

District information
- Grades: Pre-kindergarten – 12
- Superintendent: Donna McMullan
- Accreditation(s): Southern Association of Colleges and Schools; Georgia Accrediting Commission

Students and staff
- Enrollment: 4,166 (2022–23)
- Faculty: 268.60 (FTE)
- Student–teacher ratio: 15.51

Other information
- Telephone: (706) 367-2880
- Fax: (706) 367-2291
- Website: jeffcityschools.org

The Jefferson City Schools is a public school district in Jackson County, Georgia, United States, based in Jefferson. It serves Jefferson and the surrounding communities in Jackson County.

== Schools ==
The Jefferson City School District has two elementary schools, one middle school, and one high school.

=== Elementary schools ===
- Jefferson Academy
- Jefferson Elementary School

=== Middle school ===
- Jefferson Middle School

=== High school ===
- Jefferson High School

== COVID-19 Pandemic ==
In the summer of 2020, Jefferson City Schools made national headlines as one of the first school districts in the United States (and the first in Georgia) to resume in-person classes during the COVID-19 pandemic.
