= List of school districts in Georgia =

The following is a list of school districts in Georgia; in most cases the list identifies the city or county in Georgia associated with the school district. These districts are a legally separate body corporate and politic. These school districts are run by either elected county boards of education or city school boards. The U.S. Census Bureau counts them as separate governments. Georgia has no public school systems dependent on other layers of government.

District name	City	County name
Appling County School District	Baxley	Appling
Atkinson County School District	Pearson	Atkinson
Atlanta Public Schools	Atlanta	DeKalb, Fulton
Bacon County School District	Alma	Bacon
Baker County School District	Newton	Baker
Baldwin County School District	Milledgeville	Baldwin
Banks County School District	Homer	Banks
Barrow County Schools	Winder	Barrow
Bartow County School District	Cartersville	Bartow
Ben Hill County School District	Fitzgerald	Ben Hill
Berrien County School District	Nashville	Berrien
Bibb County School District	Macon	Bibb
Bleckley County School District	Cochran	Bleckley
Brantley County School District	Nahunta	Brantley
Bremen City School District	Bremen	Haralson
Brooks County School District	Quitman	Brooks
Bryan County School District	Pembroke	Bryan
Buford City School District	Buford	Gwinnett
Bulloch County School District	Statesboro	Bulloch
Burke County School District	Waynesboro	Burke
Butts County School District	Jackson	Butts
Calhoun City School District	Calhoun	Gordon
Calhoun County School District	Morgan	Calhoun
Camden County School District	Kingsland	Camden
Candler County School District	Metter	Candler
Carroll County School District	Carrollton	Carroll
Carrollton City School District	Carrollton	Carroll
Cartersville City School District	Catersville	Bartow
Catoosa County School District	Ringgold	Catoosa
CCAT	Statesboro	Bulloch
Charlton County School District	Folkston	Charlton
Chattahoochee County School District	Cusseta	Chattahoochee
Chattooga County School District	Summerville	Chattooga
Cherokee County School District	Canton	Cherokee
Chickamauga City School District	Chickamauga	Walker
Clarke County School District	Athens	Clarke
Clay County School District	Fort Gaines	Clay
Clayton County Public Schools	Jonesboro	Clayton
Clinch County School District	Homerville	Clinch
Cobb County Public Schools	Marietta	Cobb
Coffee County School District	Douglas	Coffee
Colquitt County School District	Moultrie	Colquitt
Columbia County School System	Evans	Columbia
Commerce City School District	Commerce	Jackson
Cook County School District	Adel	Cook
Coweta County School System	Newnan	Coweta
Crawford County School District	Roberta	Crawford
Crisp County School District	Cordele	Crisp
Dade County School District	Trenton	Dade
Dalton City School District	Dalton	Whitfield
Dawson County School District	Dawsonville	Dawson
Decatur City School District	Decatur	DeKalb
Decatur County School District	Bainbridge	Decatur
DeKalb County School System	Decatur	DeKalb
Dodge County School District	Eastman	Dodge
Dooly County School District	Vienna	Dooly
Dougherty County School System	Albany	Dougherty
Douglas County School District	Douglasville	Douglas
Dublin City School District	Dublin	Laurens
Early County School District	Blakely	Early
Echols County School District	Statenville	Echols
Effingham County School District	Springfield	Effingham
Elbert County School District	Elberton	Elbert
Emanuel County School District	Swainsboro	Emanuel
Evans County School District	Claxton	Evans
Fannin County School District	Blue Ridge	Fannin
Fayette County School System	Fayetteville	Fayette
Floyd County School District	Rome	Floyd
Forsyth County Schools	Cumming	Forsyth
Franklin County School District	Carnesville	Franklin
Fulton County School System	Atlanta	Fulton
Gainesville City School District	Gainesville	Hall
Gilmer County School District	Ellijay	Gilmer
Glascock County School District	Gibson	Glascock
Glynn County School District	Brunswick	Glynn
Gordon County School District	Calhoun	Gordon
Grady County School District	Cairo	Grady
Greene County School District	Greensboro	Greene
Griffin-Spalding County School District	Griffin	Spalding
Gwinnett County Public Schools	Lawrenceville	Gwinnett
Habersham County School District	Clarkesville	Habersham
Hall County School District	Gainesville	Hall
Hancock County School District	Sparta	Hancock
Haralson County School District	Buchanan	Haralson
Harris County School District	Hamilton	Harris
Hart County School District	Hartwell	Hart
Heard County School District	Franklin	Heard
Henry County School District	McDonough	Henry
Houston County Schools	Perry	Houston
Irwin County School District	Ocilla	Irwin
Jackson County School District	Jefferson	Jackson
Jasper County School District	Monticello	Jasper
Jeff Davis County School District	Hazlehurst	Jeff Davis
Jefferson City School District	Jefferson	Jackson
Jefferson County School District	Louisville	Jefferson
Jenkins County School District	Millen	Jenkins
Johnson County School District	Wrightsville	Johnson
Jones County School District	Gray	Jones
Lamar County School District	Barnesville	Lamar
Lanier County School District	Lakeland	Lanier
Laurens County School District	Dublin	Laurens
Lee County School District	Leesburg	Lee
Liberty County School District	Hinesville	Liberty
Lincoln County School District	Lincolnton	Lincoln
Long County School District	Ludowici	Long
Lowndes County School District	Valdosta	Lowndes
Lumpkin County School District	Dahlonega	Lumpkin
Macon County School District	Oglethorpe	Macon
Madison County School District	Danielsville	Madison
Marietta City School District	Marietta	Cobb
Marion County School District	Buena Vista	Marion
McDuffie County School District	Thomason	McDuffie
McIntosh County School District	Darien	McIntosh
Meriwether County School District	Greenville	Meriwether
Miller County School District	Colquitt	Miller
Mitchell County School District	Camilla	Mitchell
Monroe County School District	Forsyth	Monroe
Montgomery County School District	Mount Vernon	Montgomery
Morgan County School District	Madison	Morgan
Murray County School District	Chatsworth	Murray
Muscogee County School District	Columbus	Muscogee
Newton County School District	Covington	Newton
Oconee County School District	Watkinsville	Oconee
Oglethorpe County School District	Lexington	Oglethorpe
Paulding County School District	Dallas	Paulding
Peach County School District	Fort Valley	Peach
Pelham City School District	Pelham	Mitchell
Pickens County School District	Jasper	Pickens
Pierce County School District	Blackshear	Pierce
Pike County School District	Zebulon	Pike
Polk County School District	Cedartown	Polk
Pulaski County School District	Hawkinsville	Pulaski
Putnam County School District	Eatonton	Putnam
Quitman County School District	Georgetown	Quitman
Rabun County School District	Clayton	Rabun
Randolph County School District	Cuthert	Randolph
Richmond County School System	Augusta	Richmond
Rockdale County School District	Conyers	Rockdale
Rome City School District	Rome	Floyd
Savannah-Chatham County Public Schools	Savannah	Chatham
Schley County School District	Ellaville	Schley
Screven County School District	Sylvania	Screven
Seminole County School District	Donalsonville	Seminole
Social Circle City School District	Social Circle	Walton
State Charter Schools Commission of Georgia	Atlanta	Fulton
Stephens County School District	Toccoa	Stephens
Stewart County School District	Lumpkin	Stewart
Sumter County School District	Americus	Sumter
Talbot County School District	Talbotton	Talbot
Taliaferro County School District	Crawfordville	Taliaferro
Tattnall County School District	Reidsville	Tattnall
Taylor County School District	Butler	Taylor
Telfair County School District	McRae	Telfair
Terrell County School District	Dawson	Terrell
Thomas County School District	Thomasville	Thomas
Thomaston-Upson County School District	Thomaston	Upson
Thomasville City School District	Thomasville	Thomas
Tift County School District	Tifton	Tift
Toombs County School District	Lyons	Toombs
Towns County School District	Hiawassee	Towns
Treutlen County School District	Soperton	Treutlen
Trion City School District	Trion	Chattooga
Troup County School District	Lagrange	Troup
Turner County School District	Ashburn	Turner
Twiggs County School District	Jeffersonville	Twiggs
Union County School District	Blairsville	Union
Valdosta City School District	Valdosta	Lowndes
Vidalia City School District	Vidalia	Toombs
Walker County School District	LaFayette	Walker
Walton County School District	Monroe	Walton
Ware County School District	Waycross	Ware
Warren County School District	Warrenton	Warren
Washington County School District	Sandersville	Washington
Wayne County School District	Jesup	Wayne
Webster County School District	Preston	Webster
Wheeler County School District	Alamo	Wheeler
White County School District	Cleveland	White
Whitfield County School District	Dalton	Whitfield
Wilcox County School District	Abbeville	Wilcox
Wilkes County School District	Washington	Wilkes
Wilkinson County School District	Irwinton	Wilkinson
Worth County School District	Sylvester	Worth

== See also ==
- List of schools in Georgia
- List of charter schools in Georgia
