= Hall High School =

Hall High School may refer to:

- Hall High School (Arkansas) — Little Rock, Arkansas
- Hall High School (Connecticut) — West Hartford, Connecticut
- Hall High School (Illinois) — Spring Valley, Illinois
- East Hall High School — Gainesville, Georgia
- North Hall High School — Gainesville, Georgia
- West Hall High School — Oakwood, Georgia
- White Hall High School — White Hall, Arkansas
- Calvert Hall College High School — Towson, Maryland
- Cretin-Derham Hall High School — St. Paul, Minnesota
- Lyman Hall High School — Wallingford, Connecticut
- Nerinx Hall High School — St. Louis, Missouri
- Perry Hall High School — Baltimore, Maryland
- Seton Hall Preparatory School — West Orange, New Jersey
- Holland Hall — Tulsa, Oklahoma
