= Flowery Branch High School =

Public school in Flowery Branch, Georgia, United States

Location
- 4500 Hog Mountain Road; Flowery Branch, Georgia 30542; United States; 34°11′09″N 83°54′06″W

Information
- School type: Public
- Motto: "Fostering Beliefs"
- Established: 2002
- School district: Hall County Schools
- Principal: Jason Carter
- Teaching staff: 82.50 (on an FTE basis)
- Enrollment: 1,350 (2023–24)
- Student to teacher ratio: 16.36
- Campus: Suburban
- Colors: Red and black
- Athletics conference: GHSA Div. 8-AAAA
- Mascot: Falcon
- Rivals: Gainesville High School
- Website: fbhs.hallco.org

Flowery Branch High School is a four-year public high school located in Flowery Branch, Georgia, United States, operated by Hall County Schools. In 2007, Flowery Branch was voted Georgia's High School of Excellence. It is one of seven high schools in the district and enrolls about 1,600 students.

The attendance boundary includes eastern portions of Flowery Branch. The school also serves areas with Buford postal addresses that are not in the Buford city limits.

== History ==
A previous school named Flowery Branch High School burned down in 1943. Afterwards, students continued their education at neighboring schools. Many years later in 2002, Hall County Schools added two new high schools, a new Flowery Branch High School and Chestatee High School in the northern part of the county. FBHS was opened on Hog Mountain Road to relieve neighboring Johnson High School and West Hall High School.

Hall County experienced a 29% growth rate over the period of 2000 to 2010. The Flowery Branch High School had a 44.58% growth rate over this same time.

In 2012, Flowery Branch High School received a charter from the Georgia Department of Education, which allowed for a Global Studies and Leadership Academy. The school dissolved the charter and began a STEAM program of choice in 2017.

== Extracurricular activities ==
=== Music ===
The Flowery Branch High School band program is presently under the direction of Miguel Guisasola. The program consists of two concert bands, marching band, jazz band, Winter guard and steel drum band all of which have received consistent superior ratings. The marching band is regionally known for its outstanding drumline and front ensemble which regularly receive high recognition in competition. Since 2021, the FBHS Band plays host to The Branch Classic, a marching band competition that brings in bands from all of the state for a full day of musical performances.

=== Athletics ===
Flowery Branch is a member of the Georgia High School Association (GHSA) in Class AAAA Region 7.

==== Football ====
The Flowery Branch Falcons football team has developed into state contenders. Head coach Lee Shaw built the program from the ground up, going from an inaugural 0-10 season in 2002 to a state finals appearance in 2008. After three years with a combined record of 6-24, Shaw and the Falcons broke through in 2005 with an 11-2 record and a trip to the Elite 8. The Falcons have achieved four straight playoff appearances with a 52-14 combined record.

During the 2008 postseason, Flowery Branch adopted the name "Road Warriors," traveling over 900 miles throughout the playoffs en route to a berth in the Class AAA state championship. Due to the school's move to a new building the year prior and the expanding size of the student body, 2010 saw the Falcons move into the AAAA classification for football, and put an end to the Falcons' rivalries with nearby North Hall, Gainesville, and Chestatee.

=== Notable seasons ===
- 2009 (10-4) Region 4th Place: Class AAA Final 4
- 2008 (12-3) Region 3rd Place: Class AAA State Championship - State Runner-Up
- 2007 (9-2) Region Runner-Up: Class AAA Playoffs
- 2006 (10-2) Region Runner-Up: Class AAA Sweet 16
- 2005 (11-2) Region Runner-Up: Class AAA Elite 8
- 2011 (11-2) Region Runner-Up : Class AAAA Quarter finals
- 2012 (8-3) Region Champions: Class AAAAA First Round

== Notable alumni ==
- Brad Keller (2013), Major League Baseball pitcher
- Connor Shaw (2010), former starting quarterback for the University of South Carolina Gamecocks football team
- Maddux Trujillo (2021), NFL placekicker for the Indianapolis Colts
