= Chestatee High School =

Location
- 3005 Sardis Rd; Gainesville, Georgia 30506; United States
- 34°20′55″N 83°53′36″W

Information
- Motto: "Chestatee... illuminating minds and changing lives"
- Established: 2002
- School district: Hall County Schools
- Principal: Jennifer Gibson
- Staff: 80.70 (FTE)
- Grades: 9–12
- Enrollment: 1,216 (2023–2024)
- Student to teacher ratio: 15.07
- Colors: Maroon, silver, and black
- Athletics conference: GHSA Div. 7AAAA
- Mascot: War Eagle
- Rivals: North Hall High School, White County High School, Lumpkin County High School
- Website: Chestatee High School

Chestatee High School is a public high school located in Gainesville, Georgia, United States, operated by Hall County Schools. The school was established in 2002 when the enrollment at North Hall High School grew too large. The school serves the communities of Gainesville, Murrayville, and Dawsonville.

== Profile ==
Chestatee High School is a four-year public high school, one of six high schools serving students in Hall County, Georgia. It is located 50 miles (80 km) northeast of Atlanta. It serves 1,120 students in grades 9–12. Chestatee Middle School feeds into Chestatee High School.

=== Demographics ===
- Asian: 1.8%
- Black: 1.8%
- Hispanic: 39.7%
- Native American: 0.3%
- White: 55.0%
- Multi-racial: 1.4%

== Athletics ==
Chestatee competes in Sub-Division A of Region 7-AAA. Chestatee fields teams in football, baseball, basketball (boys' and girls'), cheerleading/competition cheerleading, softball, cross country, tennis, track and field, wrestling, soccer (boys' and girls'), and volleyball. The school is a member of the Georgia High School Association. Chestatee now competes in subdivision A of 8-AAA.

== Performing Arts ==
=== Drama ===
The War Eagle actors won the 2017 GHSA one-act play state championship.
