= Georgia High School Association =

High school athletic organization

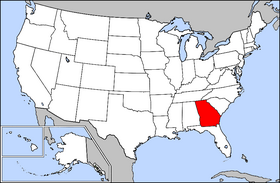
- Abbreviation: GHSA
- Formation: 1904
- Merger of: Georgia Interscholastic Association
- Legal status: 501(c)(3) association (1986)
- Headquarters: 151 S. Bethel St. Thomaston, GA 30286
- Region served: Georgia
- Members: 457 high schools (2022–2023)
- Executive director: Gary Phillips
- Affiliations: National Federation of State High School Associations
- Staff: 13
- Website: ghsa.net

The Georgia High School Association (GHSA) is an organization that attempts to govern athletics and activities for member high schools in the U.S. state of Georgia. GHSA is a member of the National Federation of State High School Associations. The association has 463 public and private high schools as members. GHSA organizes all sports and academic competitions as well as overseeing registration, training, and approves local area sports officials associations to administer regional athletics and activities per member schools.

== Membership ==
Membership to the GHSA is voluntary and open to every high school in the state of Georgia, although participating private schools must have at least 150 students in their high school. Many private schools that do not enter the GHSA compete in the interscholastic organization of the Georgia Independent School Association (GISA). Member schools of the GHSA make most decisions by appointing region representatives who vote on proposals in the GHSA Executive Committee. Individual decisions by regions are made by the schools in the region on such issues as region tiebreakers and hosting of region tournaments. Members are divided into seven classes by size and then further divided into regions based on geographic locations.

== History ==
At least one prior organization was integrated into the GHSA. The Georgia Interscholastic Association (GIA) was a school sports league in Georgia. It was integrated into the GHSA in 1970.

The Big 7 Conference included large high schools for African American students in Georgia. The GIA was an expansion of this league that came include county high schools around the state.

As If We Were Ghosts is a documentary film made about the GIA and its athletes.

== Classifications ==
The GHSA currently has six classes, AAAAAA, AAAAA, AAAA, AAA, AA, and A, (called "6A", 5A", "4A", "3A", "2A", and "1A") based on the schools' student population. Each class has eight regions, numbered 1 through 8, based on the geographic location of the schools involved. Region 1 of each class is usually the southernmost region, with the region numbers generally increasing as one moves north. Regions realign every two years. Regions generally have ten schools, but can range from 4 to 16 teams.

Class 5A was created for the 2000-2001 school year. Class 6A was created for the 2012–2013 school year and Class 7A for the 2016–2017 school year to accommodate growth in local schools.

In late 2023, GHSA announced that they would be dropping the "7A" classification for the 2024-2026 cycle. They have yet to state whether or not this will be a permanent change.

== Competitions ==
=== Athletics ===
Boys athletics governed by the GHSA are: baseball, basketball, cross country, football, golf, lacrosse, riflery (co-ed), soccer, swimming, tennis, track, and wrestling. Girls athletics programs overseen by the GHSA include basketball, competition cheerleading (co-ed & non co-ed), cross country, golf, gymnastics, lacrosse, riflery, fast pitch softball, slow pitch softball, soccer, swimming, tennis, track, volleyball, and wrestling.

=== Other ===
Literary activities administered by the GHSA are dramatic interpretation, essay, debate, extemporaneous speaking, one act plays, quartet, spelling, trio and vocal solo.

The GHSA has also added Esports as an event.

== List of schools ==
For the 2026–2028 season, GHSA has 457 member schools.

List by class and region
Class	1	2	3	4	5	6	7	8	9	Count
7A	Camden County; Colquitt County; Lowndes; Richmond Hill; Valdosta	Carrollton; Douglas County; East Coweta; Northgate; Westlake	Campbell; Harrison; Hillgrove; Kennesaw Mountain; McEachern; North Atlanta; Pebblebrook	Archer; Grayson; Newton; Rockdale County; South Gwinnett	Cherokee; Etowah; Marietta; North Cobb; North Paulding; Paulding County; Walton; Wheeler	Alliance Academy; Denmark; Forsyth Central; Innovation Academy; Lambert; North Forsyth; South Forsyth; West Forsyth	Berkmar; Brookwood; Duluth; Norcross; North Gwinnett; Parkview; Peachtree Ridge	Buford; Central Gwinnett; Collins Hill; Dacula; Discovery; Mill Creek; Seckinger	N/A	52
6A	Bradwell Institute; Brunswick; Effingham County; Glynn Academy; Greenbrier; Grovetown; Lakeside, Evans; South Effingham	Coffee; Houston County; Lee County; Northside, Warner Robins; Thomas County Central; Tift County; Veterans	Creekside; Hughes; Lovejoy; McIntosh; Morrow; Newnan; Northside, Columbus; Tri-Cities; Woodward Academy	Alcovy; Decatur; Heritage, Conyers; Lakeside, DeKalb; Loganville; Meadowcreek; Midtown; Shiloh; Walnut Grove	Alexander; Chapel Hill; East Paulding; Hiram; New Manchester; Osborne; South Cobb; South Paulding	Creekview; Kell; Lassiter; Pope; River Ridge; Rome; Sequoyah; Woodstock	Alpharetta; Chamblee; Dunwoody; Gainesville; Johns Creek; Milton; Riverwood; Roswell	Apalachee; Clarke Central; Habersham Central; Jackson County; Lanier; Mountain View	N/A	64
5A	Benedictine; Evans; Groves; Jenkins; Richmond Academy; Statesboro; Ware County; Wayne County	Eagle's Landing; Jones County; Locust Grove; Ola; Perry; Union Grove; Warner Robins	Central, Carroll; Griffin; Harris County; LaGrange; Lithia Springs; Starr's Mill; Whitewater	Arabia Mountain; Drew; Dutchtown; Eastside; Forest Park; Jonesboro; M.L. King; Mundy's Mill; Stockbridge	Banneker; Cross Keys; Druid Hills; Jackson, Atlanta; Lithonia; Mays; Southwest DeKalb; Tucker	Blessed Trinity; Cambridge; Centennial; Chattahoochee; Marist; Northview; Sprayberry; St. Pius X	Allatoona; Cartersville; Cass; Cedartown; Dalton; Villa Rica; Woodland, Cartersville	East Forsyth; Flowery Branch; Jefferson; Johnson, Gainesville; Madison County; North Oconee; Winder-Barrow	N/A	61
4A	Bainbridge; Cairo; Columbus; Dougherty; Hardaway; Monroe; Shaw; Spencer; Westover	Baldwin; Howard; Mary Persons; Peach County; Spalding; Troup County; Upson-Lee; Westside, Macon	Harlem; Liberty County; Long County; New Hampstead; Southeast Bulloch; West Laurens; Windsor Forest	Fayette County; Hampton; Luella; McDonough; Mt. Zion, Jonesboro; North Clayton; Riverdale; Sandy Creek; Woodland, Stockbridge	Clarkston; Douglass, Atlanta; Greater Atlanta Christian; North Springs; Pace Academy; Salem; Stephenson; Stone Mountain; Westminster	Chestatee; Dawson County; Gilmer; North Hall; Pickens; White County	Adairsville; Calhoun; Heritage, Catoosa; Northwest Whitfield; Ridgeland; Southeast Whitfield	Cherokee Bluff; East Hall; East Jackson; Hoschton; Monroe Area; Oconee County; West Hall	N/A	61
3A	Carver, Columbus; Crisp County; Jordan; Kendrick; Sumter County; Worth County	Callaway; Central, Macon; Jackson; Lamar County; Northeast; Pike County; Rutland; Southwest	Appling County; Beach; Brantley County; Islands; Johnson, Savannah; Pierce County; Tattnall County; Toombs County	Burke County; Butler; Cross Creek; Hephzibah; Technical Career Magnet; Thomson; Washington County; Westside, Augusta	Haralson County; Holy Innocents; KIPP Atlanta Collegiate; Lovett; North Cobb Christian; Temple; Therrell; Wesleyan	Carver, Atlanta; Cedar Grove; Columbia; Hapeville; McNair; Miller Grove; Redan; South Atlanta; Towers NR	Coahulla Creek; LaFayette; Murray County; North Murray; Ringgold; Rockmart; Sonoraville; Union County	Barrow; Elbert County; Franklin County; Hart County; Hebron Christian; Lumpkin County; Morgan County; Stephens County	N/A	62
2A	Bacon County; Berrien; Brooks County; Cook; Fitzgerald; Jeff Davis; Thomasville	ACE Charter; Bleckley County; Dodge County; Dublin; East Laurens; Swainsboro; Vidalia	Bryan County; Calvary Day School; Metter; Savannah; Savannah Arts Academy; Savannah Christian; Screven County; St. Vincent's Academy; Woodville-Tompkins	Aquinas; Davidson Fine Arts; Glenn Hills; Jasper County; Jefferson County; Johnson, Augusta; Josey; Laney; Putnam County; Social Circle; Technical Career Magnet	Ben Franklin Academy; Coretta Scott King Academy; Drew Charter School; Eagle's Landing Christian; Greenforest Christian; Landmark Christian; Paideia; Southwest Atlanta Christian; Stilwell Arts; Trinity Christian; Utopian Academy; W.D. Mohammed; Washington; Whitefield Academy	Armuchee; Bremen; Coosa; Darlington; Heard County; Model; Mt. Zion, Carroll; Pepperell	Chattooga; Christian Heritage; Dade County; Dalton Academy; Fannin County; Georgia-Cumberland Academy; Gordon Central; Gordon Lee; Lakeview-Ft. Oglethorpe	Athens Academy; Banks County; Commerce; Oglethorpe County; Prince Avenue Christian; Providence Christian; Rabun County	Atlanta International; DeKalb School of the Arts; Fellowship Christian; Galloway; Kings Ridge; Mount Vernon; Mt. Bethel Christian; Mt. Paran Christian; Mt. Pisgah Christian; St. Francis; THRIVE Christian; Walker; Weber School	85
1A	Baconton; Baker County; Calhoun County; Early County; Miller County; Pataula Charter; Pelham; Quitman County; Randolph-Clay; Scintilla Charter Academy NR; Seminole County; Southwest Georgia STEM; Spring Creek; Stewart County; Terrell County	Atkinson County; Charlton County; Clinch County; Echols County; Irwin County; Lanier County; Mitchell County	Claxton; Emanuel County Institute; McIntosh County Academy; Montgomery County; Portal; Savannah Classical; Savannah Early College; Steam Academy	Dooly County; Hawkinsville; Telfair County; Treutlen; Turner County; Wheeler County; Wilcox County	Georgia Military College; Georgia School for Innovation; Glascock County; Hancock Central; Jenkins County; Johnson County; Twiggs County; Wilkinson County; Wilson Academy	Central, Talbotton; Chattahoochee County; Crawford County; Furlow Charter; Macon County; Manchester; Marion County; Rainey-McCullers; Schley County; Taylor County; Webster County	Atlanta Classical; B.E.S.T. Academy; Bowdon; Elite Scholars Academy; Greenville; Northwest Classical Academy; Trion	Greene County; Lake Oconee Academy; Lincoln County; Taliaferro County; Towns County NR; Warren County; Washington-Wilkes; Woody Gap	N/A	72

== Notes ==
- NFHS
