= Hall County School District =

School district in Georgia (U.S. state)

Address
- 711 Green Street Gainesville, Georgia, 30501-3368; United States
- Coordinates: 34.2996°N 83.8253°W

District information
- Type: Public
- Motto: "Character, Competency, Rigor... For All"
- Grades: Pre-Kindergarten – 12
- Superintendent: Will Schofield
- School board: 5 members
- Chair of the board: Craig Herrington
- Accreditations: Southern Association of Colleges and Schools; Georgia Accrediting Commission
- Schools: Elementary: 20; Middle: 8 High: 7
- NCES District ID: 1302610

Students and staff
- Students: 27,328 (2022–23)
- Teachers: 1,890.90 (FTE)
- Staff: 1,606.90 (FTE)
- Student–teacher ratio: 14.45

Other information
- Website: hallco.org

The Hall County School District is a public school district in Hall County, Georgia, United States, based in Gainesville.

Most of the county is in the Hall County School District; however, Portions in the city limits of Buford and Gainesville are in the Buford City School District and the Gainesville City School District, respectively. It serves the communities of Clermont, Flowery Branch, Oakwood, and Rest Haven. It also serves the Hall County portions of Braselton, Gillsville, and Lula, as well as Hall County's unincorporated area.

The superintendent is Will Schofield. The chair of the Hall County Board of Education is Nath Morris, who also serves as the North Hall Representative. The four other board members are Craig Herrington, Vice-chairman and West Hall Representative; Sam Chapman, East Hall Representative; Bill Thompson, County At-Large Representative; and Mark Pettitt, South Hall Representative.

In October 2009, Hall County Schools received accreditation from the Southern Association of Colleges and Schools with a grade of A.

== Board of Education and Administration ==
=== Board of education ===
The school district is governed by the board of education. The board is made up of five members elected by all Hall County citizens. The current board members are:

Name	District
Nath Morris, Chairman	North Hall
Craig Herrington, Vice chairman	West Hall
Sam Chapman	East Hall
Brian Sloan	South Hall
Bill Thompson	County At-Large

The board holds open meetings twice a month to vote on educational matters, recognize students and teachers, and get input from the community.

== Schools ==
The Hall County School District has twenty elementary schools, seven traditional middle schools, and seven traditional high schools.

=== Elementary schools ===
- Chestnut Mountain Elementary School
- Chicopee Elementary School
- Deal Elementary School (replaces White Sulphur and Riverbend elementary schools)
- Everwood Elementary School (replaces McEver and Oakwood elementary schools)
- Flowery Branch Elementary School
- Friendship Elementary School
- Lanier Elementary School
- Lula Elementary School
- Lyman Hall Elementary School
- Martin Elementary School
- Mount Vernon Elementary School
- Myers Elementary School
- Sardis Elementary School
- Spout Springs Elementary School
- Sugar Hill Elementary School
- Tadmore Elementary School
- Wauka Mountain Elementary School
- World Language Academy

=== Middle schools ===
- Alternative Learning Center
- C. W. Davis Middle School
- Cherokee Bluff Middle School
- Chestatee Middle School
- East Hall Middle School
- North Hall Middle School
- South Hall Middle School
- West Hall Middle School
- World Language Academy

=== High schools ===
- Alternative Learning Center
- Cherokee Bluff High School
- Chestatee High School
- Early College at Jones
- East Hall High School
- Flowery Branch High School
- Johnson High School
- Lanier Career Academy
- North Hall High School
- West Hall High School
