= East Hall High School =

Location
- 3534 East Hall Road; Gainesville, Georgia 30507; United States
- Coordinates: 34°20′02″N 83°44′29″W

Information
- Motto: "Every student, every chance, every day"
- Established: 1957
- School district: Hall County Schools
- Principal: Jennifer Gibson
- Assistant principals: Micah Hoyt; Whitney Rylee; Dr. Renee Carey; Adam Rich
- Staff: 83.10 (FTE)
- Grades: 9–12
- Enrollment: 1,291 (2023–2024)
- Student to teacher ratio: 15.54
- Colors: Black and gold
- Athletics conference: GHSA Div. 8A-AAAA
- Mascot: Viking
- Rivals: White County High School, Gainesville High School
- Yearbook: The Viking
- Website: East Hall High School

East Hall High School is a four-year comprehensive high school located in the eastern portion of Hall County, Georgia, United States. The school is operated by Hall County Schools, and serves the communities of Lula, Gainesville, and Gillsville.

== About East Hall ==
East Hall High School is located just outside Gainesville, Georgia, in northeastern Hall County, about 60 miles northeast of Atlanta. East Hall is set in a rural area where many families are blue collar workers, representing almost entirely middle-class families.

== Adjacent schools ==
- Northeast - White County High School
- Northwest - North Hall High School
- West - Gainesville High School
- Southwest - Johnson High School
- Southeast - Jackson County Comprehensive High School
- East - Banks County High School

== Academics ==
Per Hall County Schools, the school requires four credits in English, four credits in mathematics, four credits in science, three credits in social studies, one credit total for physical education and health, and seven credits in electives as of the 2023-24 school year.

- Honors and AP courses are available.
- The student-teacher ratio is 15.54.

== Demographics ==
- White - 35%
- Black - 19%
- Hispanic - 45%
- Asian - 1%

== Extracurricular activities ==
- Academic Team
- Beta
- Cheerleading
- DECA
- FBLA
- FCA
- FFA
- HOSA
- JHBA
- Marching Band
- National Honor Society
- National Thespian Society

== Athletics ==
In recent years the East Hall Vikings have qualified for the Class AAA State Playoffs in at least two sports each year, with several Final Four and state appearances. The sports offered at East Hall are football, softball, volleyball, wrestling, baseball, tennis, cross country, track and field, men's basketball, ladies' basketball, men's soccer, and ladies' soccer.

== East Hall Viking Band ==
The band program averages nearly 15% participation by the student body. In 1992, the East Hall High School Viking Marching Band was proclaimed "Grand Champion" of the Fort Mountain Marching Contest in Chatsworth, Georgia, winning first place in every caption of the event. In 1993 and 1994, the Viking Band won the Sweepstakes Trophy at the Dixieland Classic in Covington, Georgia. Since 1995, the Viking Marching Band has participated in the Georgia Mountain Marching Festival.

The band has performed in the Tournament of Roses Parade, the Cotton Bowl Parade, the Orange Bowl Halftime and Parade Performances, the Philadelphia Thanksgiving Day Parade, the National Cherry Blossom Festival Parade, The Nations Day Parade in New York City, the Macy's Holiday Parade in Orlando, Florida, the Outback Bowl Halftime Performance and Parade, the Macy's Egleston Christmas Parade, and the King Orange Jamboree Parade. It has also performed halftime shows for the Atlanta Falcons and performed several times at Walt Disney World. The band was proclaimed "Ambassadors of Good Will" from the state of Georgia by Governor Joe Frank Harris.

The marching band is divided into three concert organizations and both are entered in concert festival each year sponsored by the Georgia Music Educators Association.

In the fall of 2004, band director Craig Cantrell formed the East Hall High School Wind Symphony. All concert organizations, Beginning Band, Concert Band, Symphonic Band, and Wind Symphony, are conducted by Cantrell.

== Notable alumni ==
- Kyvon Davenport (2015), Basketball player
- Sandra Dunagan Deal (1960), First Lady of Georgia from 2011 to 2019
- Shelly Echols (1998), Georgia State Senator from the 49th District
- Brenda Hill-Gilmore (1983), NAIA Basketball Player of the Year 1987
