= Hall County, Georgia =

County in Georgia, United States

- County
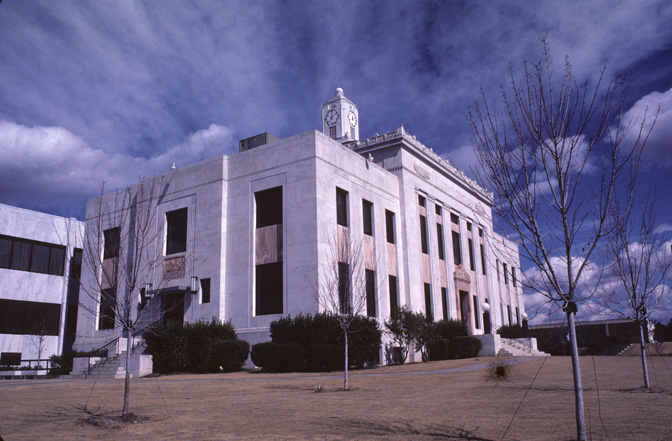
- Hall County courthouse in Gainesville

- Seal Logo

- Location within the U.S. state of Georgia
- Coordinates: 34.32°N 83.82°W
- Country: United States
- State: Georgia
- Founded: December 15, 1818; 207 years ago
- Named for: Lyman Hall
- Seat: Gainesville
- Largest city: Gainesville

Area
  - Total: 429 sq mi (1,110 km^{2})
  - Land: 393 sq mi (1,020 km^{2})
  - Water: 37 sq mi (96 km^{2}) 8.5%

Population (2020)
  - Total: 203,136
  - Estimate (2025): 226,568 ▲
  - Density: 517/sq mi (200/km^{2})
- Time zone: UTC−5 (Eastern)
  - Summer (DST): UTC−4 (EDT)
- Congressional districts: 9th, 7th
- Website: hallcounty.org

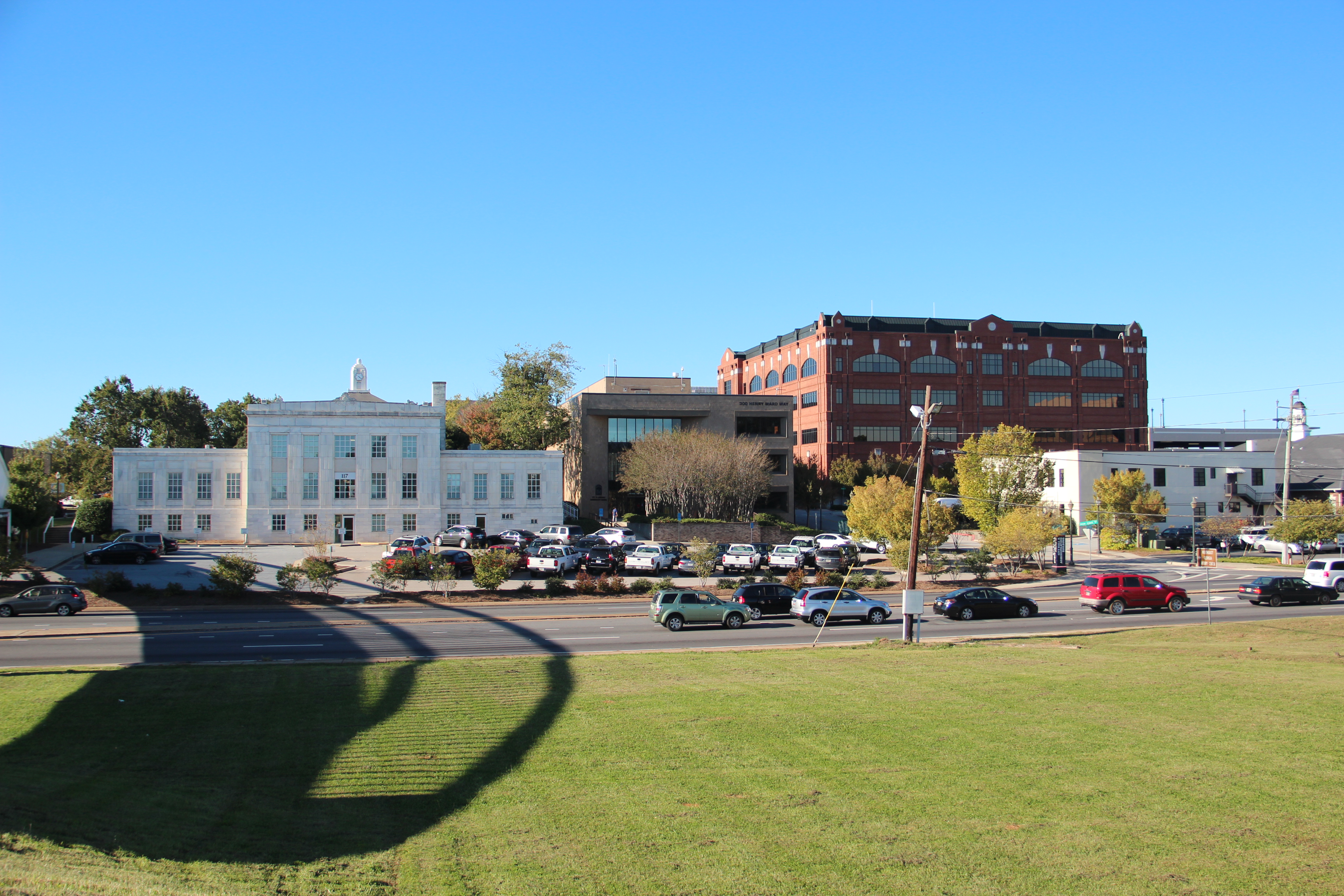
Downtown Gainesville

Hall County is a county in the Northeast region of the U.S. state of Georgia. As of the 2020 census, the population was 203,136, up from 179,684 at the 2010 census. The county seat is Gainesville. The entirety of Hall County comprises the Gainesville metropolitan area, which is also part of the Atlanta-Athens-Clarke County-Sandy Springs, Combined Statistical Area.

== History ==
Hall County was created on December 15, 1818, from Cherokee lands ceded by the Treaty of Cherokee Agency (1817) and Treaty of Washington (1819).

The county is named for Lyman Hall, a signer of the Declaration of Independence and governor of Georgia as both colony and state.

== Geography ==
According to the U.S. Census Bureau, the county has a total area of 429 square miles (1,110 km^{2}), of which 393 square miles (1,020 km^{2}) is land and 37 square miles (96 km^{2}) (8.5%) is water. The county is located in the upper Piedmont region of the state in the foothills of the Blue Ridge Mountains to the north.

Slightly more than half of Hall County, the eastern portion of the county, is located in the Upper Oconee River sub-basin of the Altamaha River basin, while the western half of the county is located in the Upper Chattahoochee River sub-basin of the ACF River Basin (Apalachicola-Chattahoochee-Flint River Basin).

The Chattahoochee River gathers strength in Hall County, as immortalized in Sidney Lanier's poem, "Song of the Chattahoochee":

OUT of the hills of Habersham,
Down the valleys of Hall,
I hurry amain to reach the plain,
Run the rapid and leap the fall,
Split at the rock and together again,

=== Adjacent counties ===
- White County – north
- Habersham County – northeast
- Banks County – east
- Jackson County – southeast
- Barrow County – south
- Gwinnett County – southwest
- Forsyth County – west
- Dawson County – northwest
- Lumpkin County – northwest

=== Attractions ===
- Atlanta Botanical Garden (Gainesville)
- Brenau Downtown Center (Gainesville)
- Don Carter State Park
- Elachee Nature Science Center (Gainesville)
- Falcons Complex (Flowery Branch)
- Gainesville Theatre Alliance (Gainesville)
- Interactive Neighborhood for Kids (Gainesville)
- Lake Lanier Islands (Buford)
- Lake Sidney Lanier
- Quinlan Visual Arts Center
- Road Atlanta (Braselton)

== Transportation ==
=== Major highways ===
- Interstate 985 / State Route 419 (unsigned)
- U.S. Route 23 / State Route 365
  - State Route 365 Business
- U.S. Route 129
  - U.S. 129 Business
- State Route 11
  - State Route 11 Business
- State Route 13
- State Route 51
- State Route 52
- State Route 53
  - State Route 53 Connector
- State Route 60
- State Route 82
- State Route 136
- State Route 211
- State Route 254
- State Route 283
- State Route 284
- State Route 323
- State Route 332
- State Route 347
- State Route 369

=== Mass transit ===
- The Gainesville AMTRAK station is situated at 116 Industrial Boulevard. Amtrak's Crescent train connects Gainesville with the cities of New York City, Philadelphia, Baltimore, Washington, Greensboro, Charlotte, Atlanta, Birmingham and New Orleans.
- Gainesville has a bus transit system, the Gainesville Connection, with 130 stops along three routes through Gainesville. The Hall Area Transit Transportation System began operations in January 2001 with three buses and four mini-buses.

=== Pedestrians and cycling ===
- Chicopee Woods Bike Trail
- Wilshire Trail

== Demographics ==
Historical population
Census	Pop.	Note	%±
1820	5,086		—
1830	11,748		131.0%
1840	7,875		−33.0%
1850	8,713		10.6%
1860	9,366		7.5%
1870	9,607		2.6%
1880	15,298		59.2%
1890	18,047		18.0%
1900	20,752		15.0%
1910	25,730		24.0%
1920	26,822		4.2%
1930	30,313		13.0%
1940	34,822		14.9%
1950	40,113		15.2%
1960	49,739		24.0%
1970	59,405		19.4%
1980	75,649		27.3%
1990	95,428		26.1%
2000	139,277		45.9%
2010	179,684		29.0%
2020	203,136		13.1%
2025 (est.)	226,568	▲	11.5%
U.S. Decennial Census; 1790-1880 1890-1910; 1920-1930 1930-1940; 1940-1950 1960-1980; 1980-2000 2010 2020

As of the 2010 census, the MSA had a population of 179,684 (though a July 1, 2016 estimate placed the population at 196,637).

Hall County remains extremely rural and many of its residents reside in unincorporated areas, accounting for more than half of the county's population.

=== Racial and ethnic composition ===
Hall County, Georgia – Racial and ethnic composition Note: the US Census treats Hispanic/Latino as an ethnic category. This table excludes Latinos from the racial categories and assigns them to a separate category. Hispanics/Latinos may be of any race.
Race / Ethnicity (NH = Non-Hispanic)	Pop 1980	Pop 1990	Pop 2000	Pop 2010	Pop 2020	% 1980	% 1990	% 2000	% 2010	% 2020
White alone (NH)	68,027	81,860	98,942	114,300	120,418	89.92%	85.78%	71.04%	63.61%	59.28%
Black or African American alone (NH)	6,766	8,173	9,900	12,757	14,256	8.94%	8.56%	7.11%	7.10%	7.02%
Native American or Alaska Native alone (NH)	102	177	331	372	341	0.13%	0.19%	0.24%	0.21%	0.17%
Asian alone (NH)	135	609	1,820	3,181	4,198	0.18%	0.64%	1.31%	1.77%	2.07%
Native Hawaiian or Pacific Islander alone (NH)	x	x	29	57	85	x	x	0.02%	0.03%	0.04%
Other race alone (NH)	67	51	80	249	708	0.09%	0.05%	0.06%	0.14%	0.35%
Mixed race or Multiracial (NH)	x	x	933	1,862	6,120	x	x	0.67%	1.04%	3.01%
Hispanic or Latino (any race)	552	4,558	27,242	46,906	57,010	0.73%	4.78%	19.56%	26.10%	28.06%
Total	75,649	95,428	139,277	179,684	203,136	100.00%	100.00%	100.00%	100.00%	100.00%

=== 2020 census ===
As of the 2020 census, there were 203,136 people, 71,022 households, and 48,776 families residing in the county. The median age was 37.8 years, with 24.3% of residents under the age of 18 and 16.3% aged 65 or older. For every 100 females there were 97.0 males, and for every 100 females age 18 and over there were 94.2 males age 18 and over.

Seventy-four point one percent of residents lived in urban areas, while 25.9% lived in rural areas.

The census's redistricting data reports that 64.4% of residents identified as White (of any race), while Hispanic or Latino residents of any race comprised 28.1% of the population; the non-Hispanic breakdown is shown in the table above.

There were 71,022 households in the county, of which 34.6% had children under the age of 18 living with them and 24.6% had a female householder with no spouse or partner present. About 21.3% of all households were made up of individuals and 9.6% had someone living alone who was 65 years of age or older.

There were 76,865 housing units, of which 7.6% were vacant. Among occupied housing units, 69.1% were owner-occupied and 30.9% were renter-occupied. The homeowner vacancy rate was 1.8% and the rental vacancy rate was 7.0%.

=== 2010 census ===
As of the 2010 United States census, there were 179,684 people, 60,691 households, and 45,275 families residing in the county. The population density was 457.5 inhabitants per square mile (176.6/km^{2}). There were 68,825 housing units at an average density of 175.2 per square mile (67.6/km^{2}). The racial makeup of the county was 74.1% white, 7.4% black or African American, 1.8% Asian, 0.5% American Indian, 0.1% Pacific islander, 13.9% from other races, and 2.2% from two or more races. Those of Hispanic or Latino origin made up 26.1% of the population. In terms of ancestry, 16.8% were American, 10.6% were Irish, 9.3% were English, and 8.9% were German.

Of the 60,691 households, 40.2% had children under the age of 18 living with them, 56.6% were married couples living together, 12.4% had a female householder with no husband present, 25.4% were non-families, and 20.3% of all households were made up of individuals. The average household size was 2.91 and the average family size was 3.35. The median age was 34.5 years.

The median income for a household in the county was $50,876 and the median income for a family was $57,774. Males had a median income of $38,671 versus $31,378 for females. The per capita income for the county was $23,675. About 11.3% of families and 14.8% of the population were below the poverty line, including 21.3% of those under age 18 and 11.6% of those age 65 or over.

=== 2000 census ===
At the 2000 census, 139,277 people, 80,381 households and 80,009 families resided in the county. The population density was 354 inhabitants per square mile (137/km^{2}). There were 51,046 housing units at an average density of 130 per square mile (50/km^{2}). The racial makeup of the county was 80.75% White, 7.27% Black or African American, 0.34% Native American, 1.35% Asian, 0.17% Pacific Islander, 8.75% from other races, and 1.36% from two or more races. About 19.56% of the population were Hispanic or Latino of any race.

Of the 80,381 households, 37.10% had children under the age of 18 living with them, 60.20% were married couples living together, 10.80% had a female householder with no husband present, and 24.00% were not families. About 19.20% of all households were made up of individuals, and 6.70% had someone living alone who was 65 years of age or older. The average household size was 2.89 and the average family size was 3.26.

Age distribution was 26.90% under the age of 18, 10.80% from 18 to 24, 32.30% from 25 to 44, 20.60% from 45 to 64, and 9.40% who were 65 years of age or older. The median age was 32 years. For every 100 females, there were 103.60 males. For every 100 females age 18 and over, there were 101.90 males.

The median household income was $44,908, and the median family income was $50,100. Males had a median income of $31,769 versus $24,550 for females. The per capita income for the county was $19,690. About 8.50% of families and 12.40% of the population were below the poverty line, including 15.20% of those under age 18 and 14.70% of those age 65 or over.

== Education ==
Most of the county is in the Hall County School District. Portions in the city limits of Buford and Gainesville are in the Buford City School District and the Gainesville City School District, respectively.

=== Colleges and universities ===
- Brenau University
- Lanier Technical College
- University of North Georgia, Gainesville Campus (formerly Gainesville State College)

=== High schools ===
- Cherokee Bluff High School
- Chestatee High School
- East Hall High School
- Flowery Branch High School
- Gainesville High School
- Johnson High School
- Lakeview Academy
- North Georgia Christian School
- North Hall High School
- Riverside Military Academy
- West Hall High School

=== Middle schools ===
- Academies of Discovery at South Hall
- Alternative Learning Center/International Center
- C. W. Davis Middle School
- Cherokee Bluff Middle School
- Chestatee Middle School
- East Hall Middle School
- Gainesville Middle School
- Lanier Career Academy
- North Georgia Christian School
- North Hall Middle School
- West Hall Middle School
- World Language Middle School (shares building with South Hall)

== Communities ==
=== Cities ===
- Buford (mostly in Gwinnett County)
- Flowery Branch
- Gainesville
- Gillsville (partly in Banks County)
- Lula (partly in Banks County)
- Oakwood

=== Towns ===
- Braselton (partly in Jackson, Barrow, and Gwinnett Counties)
- Clermont

=== Unincorporated communities ===
- Belmont
- Candler
- Chestnut Mountain
- Murrayville (partly in Lumpkin and White Counties)
- Chicopee
- Rabbittown

== Politics ==
As of the 2020s, Hall County is a strongly Republican voting county, voting 71% for Donald Trump in 2024. Hall County previously had voting patterns similar to the Solid South, voting Democrat in all presidential elections until 1968, with the exception of narrowly supporting Herbert Hoover against Catholic Democrat Al Smith in 1928. Since then, it has been won by the GOP by landslide margins, in stark contrast to nearby inner suburban counties of Atlanta, with the exception of segregationist George Wallace in 1968 and favorite son Jimmy Carter in both of his campaigns. As a measure of how rapidly it turned to the GOP, Carter's 21-point victory in 1980 is the last time a Democrat managed even 40 percent of the county's vote. However, conservative Democrats held most state and local offices as late as 2000.

In 2022, local media reported that Hall County Solicitor General Stephanie Woodard was under investigation for allegations of theft and misuse of public funds.

For elections to the United States House of Representatives, Hall County is part of Georgia's 9th congressional district, currently represented by Andrew Clyde. For elections to the Georgia State Senate, Hall County is part of District 49 and District 50. For elections to the Georgia House of Representatives, Hall County is divided between districts 27, 28, 29, 30, 31, 100 and 103.

United States presidential election results for Hall County, Georgia
Year	Republican		Democratic		Third party(ies)	
Year	No.	%	No.	%	No.	%
1880	269	13.36%	1,745	86.64%	0	0.00%
1884	259	17.26%	1,242	82.74%	0	0.00%
1888	274	11.02%	2,170	87.29%	42	1.69%
1892	237	9.51%	1,526	61.26%	728	29.23%
1896	582	31.49%	1,134	61.36%	132	7.14%
1900	262	21.72%	880	72.97%	64	5.31%
1904	190	9.61%	1,135	57.41%	652	32.98%
1908	634	42.81%	707	47.74%	140	9.45%
1912	116	7.55%	1,145	74.54%	275	17.90%
1916	141	6.50%	1,662	76.59%	367	16.91%
1920	852	36.61%	1,475	63.39%	0	0.00%
1924	290	15.57%	1,398	75.04%	175	9.39%
1928	1,573	50.81%	1,523	49.19%	0	0.00%
1932	120	4.32%	2,649	95.29%	11	0.40%
1936	444	13.96%	2,731	85.85%	6	0.19%
1940	513	14.73%	2,943	84.52%	26	0.75%
1944	796	20.61%	3,066	79.37%	1	0.03%
1948	606	14.57%	3,093	74.37%	460	11.06%
1952	1,845	23.16%	6,121	76.84%	0	0.00%
1956	2,752	31.48%	5,989	68.52%	0	0.00%
1960	2,903	31.53%	6,303	68.47%	0	0.00%
1964	4,296	34.90%	8,003	65.01%	11	0.09%
1968	4,923	36.08%	3,174	23.26%	5,546	40.65%
1972	10,686	81.41%	2,440	18.59%	0	0.00%
1976	5,093	28.46%	12,804	71.54%	0	0.00%
1980	7,760	37.81%	12,124	59.08%	637	3.10%
1984	15,076	67.01%	7,421	32.99%	0	0.00%
1988	17,415	68.71%	7,782	30.71%	147	0.58%
1992	16,108	49.67%	11,214	34.58%	5,111	15.76%
1996	19,280	59.84%	10,362	32.16%	2,577	8.00%
2000	26,841	70.36%	10,259	26.89%	1,050	2.75%
2004	38,883	78.09%	10,514	21.12%	395	0.79%
2008	44,962	74.77%	14,457	24.04%	711	1.18%
2012	47,481	77.19%	12,999	21.13%	1,032	1.68%
2016	51,733	72.72%	16,180	22.74%	3,229	4.54%
2020	64,183	70.84%	25,033	27.63%	1,386	1.53%
2024	72,991	71.58%	28,347	27.80%	635	0.62%

United States Senate election results for Hall County, Georgia2
Year	Republican		Democratic		Third party(ies)	
Year	No.	%	No.	%	No.	%
2020	63,833	71.09%	23,487	26.16%	2,467	2.75%
2020	57,157	72.31%	21,883	27.69%	0	0.00%

United States Senate election results for Hall County, Georgia3
Year	Republican		Democratic		Third party(ies)	
Year	No.	%	No.	%	No.	%
2020	39,470	44.10%	14,889	16.64%	35,136	39.26%
2020	56,718	71.78%	22,296	28.22%	0	0.00%
2022	51,643	70.74%	19,196	26.29%	2,166	2.97%
2022	47,471	72.70%	17,826	27.30%	0	0.00%

Georgia Gubernatorial election results for Hall County
Year	Republican		Democratic		Third party(ies)	
Year	No.	%	No.	%	No.	%
2022	56,573	76.95%	16,299	22.17%	644	0.88%

== See also ==
- National Register of Historic Places listings in Hall County, Georgia
- List of counties in Georgia
