= White County High School =

White County High School may refer to:

- White County High School (Cleveland, Georgia), United States
- White County High School (Sparta, Tennessee), United States
