= Maddux Trujillo =

American football player (born 2003)

Profile
- Position: Kicker

Personal information
- Born: April 12, 2003 (age 23); Flowery Branch, Georgia, U.S.
- Listed height: 6 ft 0 in (1.83 m)
- Listed weight: 172 lb (78 kg)

Career information
- High school: Flowery Branch
- College: Austin Peay (2021–2023); Temple (2024)
- NFL draft: 2025: undrafted

Career history
- Indianapolis Colts (2025)*; Buffalo Bills (2026)*
- * Offseason or practice squad member only

Awards and highlights
- Second-team All-AAC (2024); Second-team All-UAC (2023); Offensive All-ASUN (2022); Second-team All-OVC (2021)
- Stats at Pro Football Reference

Maddux Chase Trujillo (born April 12, 2003) is an American professional football kicker. He played college football for the Austin Peay Governors and Temple Owls. He has had stints with the Indianapolis Colts and Buffalo Bills during offseason practices.

== Early life ==
Trujillo attended Flowery Branch High School in Flowery Branch, Georgia. He committed to play college football for the Austin Peay Governors.

== College career ==
During his three year career at Austin Peay from 2021 through 2023, Trujillo converted on 38-of-54 field goal attempts. He was a three-time all-conference selection at Austin Peay. After the 2023 season, Trujillo entered his name into the NCAA transfer portal.

Trujillo transferred to play for the Temple Owls. In week 4 of the 2024 season, he made a 64-yard field goal in a win over Utah State, which set the record for the longest field goal in both Temple history and Lincoln Financial Field history. For his performance, Trujillo was named the AAC special teams player of the week. In week 12, he made four field goals, including a walk-off 39-yard field goal against FAU. Trujillo finished the 2024 season, converting on all 21 extra point attempts, while also making 16 of 22 field goal attempts, with five field goals from 50+ yards. After the season, he declared for the 2025 NFL Draft.

== Professional career ==
Pre-draft measurables
Height	Weight	Arm length	Hand span	Wingspan
6 ft 0 3/8 in (1.84 m)	172 lb (78 kg)	30 3/4 in (0.78 m)	10 in (0.25 m)	6 ft 2 3/4 in (1.90 m)
All values from Pro Day

=== Indianapolis Colts ===
After not being selected in the 2025 NFL draft, Trujillo signed with the Indianapolis Colts as an undrafted free agent. Heading into the 2025 season, he competed with Spencer Shrader for the Colts starting kicker job. He was waived on August 26 with an injury designation as part of final roster cuts.

=== Buffalo Bills ===
On January 6, 2026, Trujillo signed a reserve/future contract with the Buffalo Bills. He was waived by the Bills on May 12.
