= Martrez Milner =

American football player (born 1984)

No. 88
- Position: Tight end

Personal information
- Born: August 8, 1984 (age 42); Oakwood, Georgia, U.S.
- Listed height: 6 ft 4 in (1.93 m)
- Listed weight: 256 lb (116 kg)

Career information
- High school: West Hall (Oakwood)
- College: Georgia
- NFL draft: 2007: 4th round, 133rd overall pick

Career history
- Atlanta Falcons (2007–2008); New York Giants (2008–2009)*; New York Jets (2009)*; New Orleans Saints (2009)*
- * Offseason or practice squad member only

Awards and highlights
- First-team All-SEC (2006)

Career NFL statistics
- Receptions: 9
- Receiving yards: 50
- Stats at Pro Football Reference

Martrez Milner (born August 8, 1984) is an American former professional football player who was a tight end in the National Football League (NFL). He played college football for the Georgia Bulldogs and was selected by the Atlanta Falcons in the fourth round of the 2007 NFL draft.

Milner was also a member of the New York Giants, New York Jets, and New Orleans Saints.

== Professional career ==
=== Atlanta Falcons ===
Milner was selected by the Atlanta Falcons in the fourth round of the 2007 NFL draft with the 133rd overall pick. He was released on September 16, 2008.

=== New York Giants ===
Later in September, the New York Giants signed Milner to their practice squad. Following the season, he was re-signed to a future contract on January 12, 2009. He waived on May 21, 2009.

=== New York Jets ===
Milner was claimed off waivers by the New York Jets on May 27, 2009. He was waived on June 11, 2009.

=== New Orleans Saints ===
Milner signed with the New Orleans Saints on August 16, 2009. He was waived on September 5, 2009.
