= Braselton, Georgia =

- Town
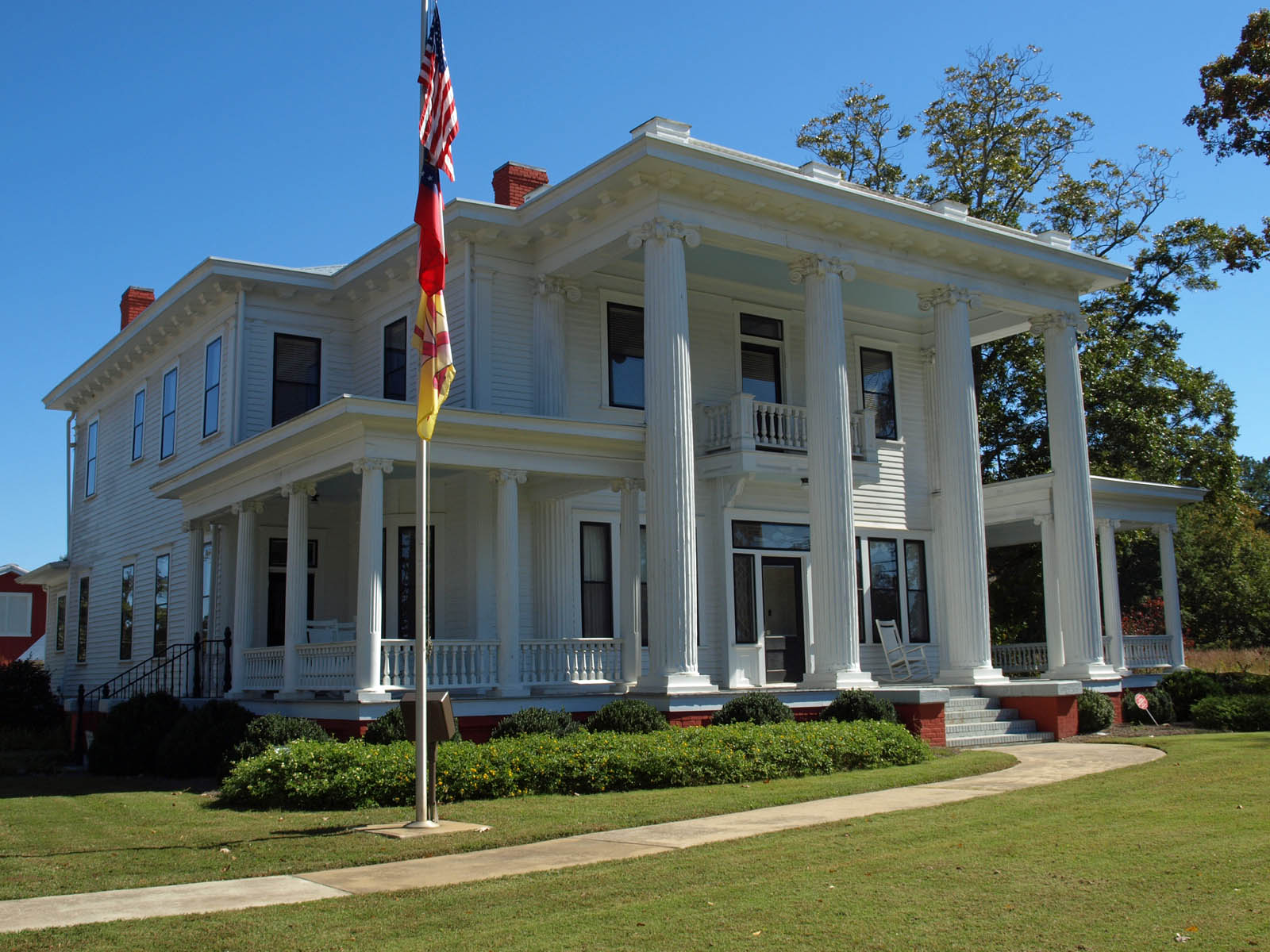
- Town hall

- Logo
- Motto: "A past to preserve and a future to mold" "It's better in Braselton"
- Location in Jackson County and the state of Georgia
- Coordinates: 34°06′33″N 83°45′46″W
- Country: United States
- State: Georgia
- Counties: Jackson, Barrow, Gwinnett, Hall

Government
  - Mayor: Kurt Ward
  - Chief of Police: Terry Esco

Area
  - Total: 13.31 sq mi (34.48 km^{2})
  - Land: 13.21 sq mi (34.21 km^{2})
  - Water: 0.11 sq mi (0.28 km^{2})
- Elevation: 909 ft (277 m)

Population (2020)
  - Total: 13,403
  - Density: 1,014.8/sq mi (391.83/km^{2})
- Time zone: UTC-5 (Eastern (EST))
  - Summer (DST): UTC-4 (EDT)
- ZIP code: 30517, 30519, 30542, 30548
- Area code: 706
- FIPS code: 13-10076
- GNIS feature ID: 0331228
- Website: braselton.net

Braselton (/ˈbræzəltən/ BRAZ-əl-tən) is a town in Jackson, Barrow, Gwinnett, and Hall counties in the U.S. state of Georgia, approximately 49 miles (79 km) northeast of Atlanta. As of the 2020 census, the town had a population of 13,403, and in 2024 the estimated population was 17,390, making it the town in Georgia with the largest population growth.

The Jackson County portion of Braselton is part of the Jefferson, GA, micropolitan statistical area, while the Gwinnett and Barrow County portions are part of Metro Atlanta, and the Hall County portion is part of the Gainesville, Georgia metropolitan area.

== History ==
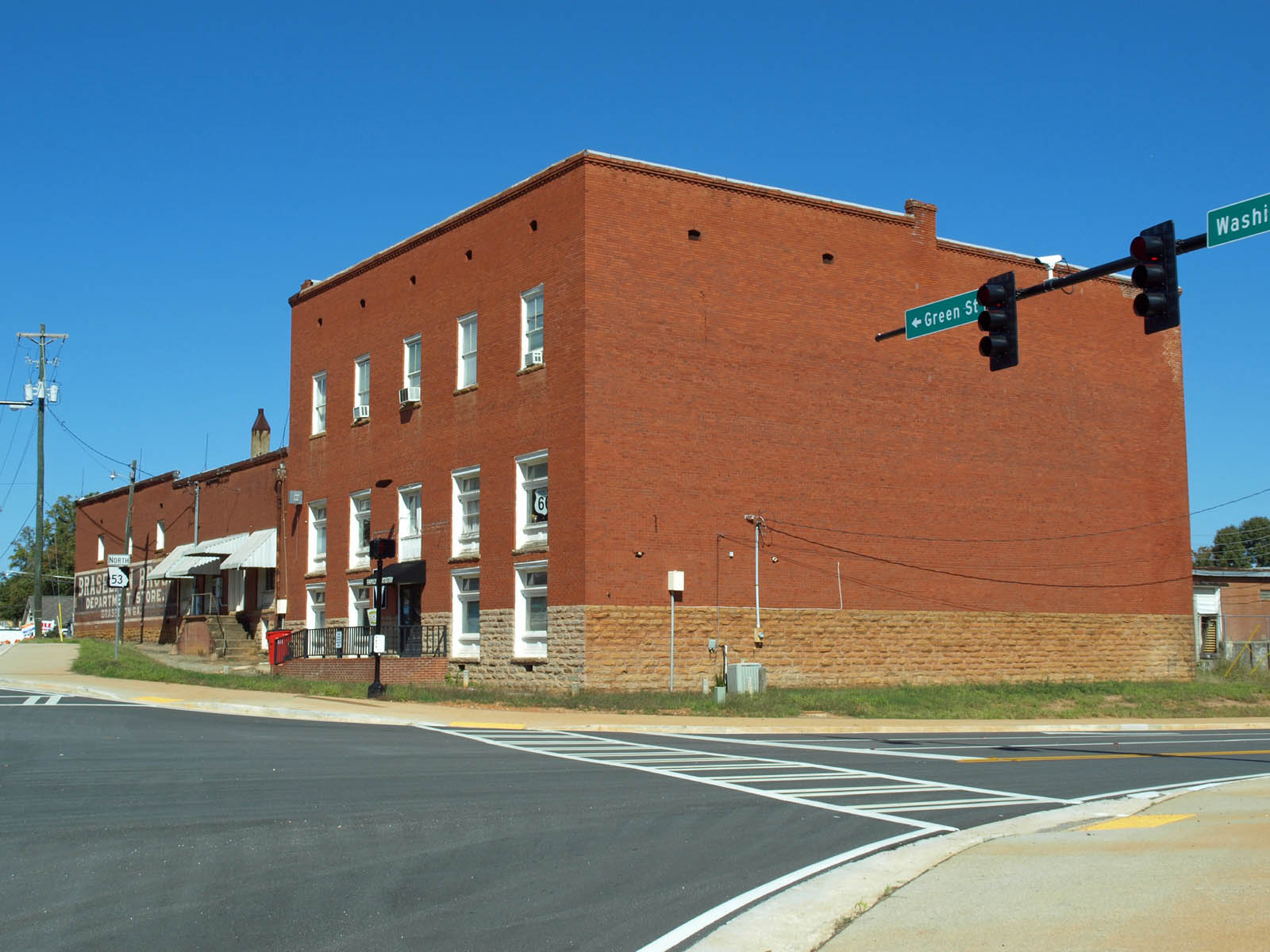
Street scene of the Braselton Historic District

The first permanent settlement at Braselton was made in 1884. The town is named after Harrison Braselton, a poor dirt farmer who married Susan Hosch, the daughter of a rich plantation owner. Braselton built a home on 786 acres (318 ha) of land he purchased north of the Hosch Plantation. The land he purchased was later called Braselton. The Georgia General Assembly incorporated Braselton as a town in 1916.

In 1989 actress and Georgia native Kim Basinger and other investors bought 1,751 acres (709 ha) of the town's 2,000 privately owned acres for $20 million from Braselton Brothers Inc, intending to turn it into a tourist destination. In 1995, facing personal bankruptcy, she and her partners sold the land for $4.3 million.

== Geography ==
Braselton is located at 34°06′33″N 83°45′46″W (34.109167, -83.762778).

According to the United States Census Bureau, the town has a total area of 12.5 square miles (32.4 km^{2}), of which 12.4 square miles (32.2 km^{2}) is land and 0.12 square miles (0.3 km^{2}), or 0.79%, is water. Braselton has seen its growth from 7.20 square miles (18.6 km^{2}) to its current size from annexations into surrounding areas.

Braselton borders the mailing addresses (not city limits) of Gainesville (Candler), Flowery Branch, Oakwood (Chestnut Mountain side), and Pendergrass.

The town borders the city limits and shares a ZIP code with Hoschton.

The Road Atlanta race track has a Braselton address, but is located just north of the town itself.

== Demographics ==
Historical population
Census	Pop.	Note	%±
1920	148		—
1930	189		27.7%
1940	197		4.2%
1950	165		−16.2%
1960	255		54.5%
1970	386		51.4%
1980	308		−20.2%
1990	418		35.7%
2000	1,206		188.5%
2010	7,511		522.8%
2020	13,403		78.4%
2025 (est.)	18,496	▲	38.0%
U.S. Decennial Census; 2025

=== 2020 census ===
As of the 2020 census, Braselton had a population of 13,403. The median age was 37.3 years. 27.6% of residents were under the age of 18 and 14.4% of residents were 65 years of age or older. For every 100 females there were 90.5 males, and for every 100 females age 18 and over there were 88.5 males age 18 and over.

98.5% of residents lived in urban areas, while 1.5% lived in rural areas.

There were 4,443 households in Braselton, of which 45.3% had children under the age of 18 living in them. Of all households, 67.8% were married-couple households, 8.4% were households with a male householder and no spouse or partner present, and 19.3% were households with a female householder and no spouse or partner present. About 13.7% of all households were made up of individuals and 6.4% had someone living alone who was 65 years of age or older. There were 3,100 families residing in the town.

There were 4,756 housing units, of which 6.6% were vacant. The homeowner vacancy rate was 2.6% and the rental vacancy rate was 11.3%.

Braselton racial composition as of 2020
Race	Num.	Perc.
White (non-Hispanic)	9,316	69.51%
Black or African American (non-Hispanic)	1,468	10.95%
Native American	17	0.13%
Asian	567	4.23%
Pacific Islander	4	0.03%
Other/Mixed	561	4.19%
Hispanic or Latino	1,470	10.97%

=== Demographic estimates ===
In 2022 the Braselton population by county breakdown was as follows: 2,973 in Gwinnett County, 1,763 in Jackson County, 1,690 in Hall County, and 1,085 in Barrow County.

== Infrastructure ==
The town operates a police department, a Hall County Sheriff's Office location, post office, and one fire station. Northeast Georgia Health System built a new hospital in the Central/Greater Braselton area that opened on April 1, 2015. It's the first net-new hospital in Georgia in 20 years.

== Education ==
Portions in Barrow County are in the Barrow County School District. For this portion, Bramlett Elementary School is the zoned elementary school, and Winder-Barrow High School is the zoned high school.

Portions in Gwinnett County are in the Gwinnett County Public Schools school district. This section is zoned to Duncan Creek Elementary School, Osborn Middle School, and Mill Creek High School.

Portions in Hall County are in the Hall County School District.

The portion in Jackson County is in the Jackson County School District.
