= West Hall High School =

Public school in Georgia, United States

Location
- 5500 McEver Road; Oakwood, Georgia 30566; United States; 34°13′04″N 83°54′39″W

Information
- Type: Public
- Established: 1988
- School district: Hall County Schools
- Principal: Ley Hathcock
- Teaching staff: 75.10 (FTE)
- Grades: 9-12
- Enrollment: 1,274 (2024-2025)
- Student to teacher ratio: 16.96
- Colors: Navy and silver
- Athletics conference: GHSA Div. 7AAA
- Mascot: Spartan
- Rivals: North Hall High School, Johnson High School, Gainesville High School
- Website: http://whhs.hallco.org/web/

West Hall High School is a public high school located in the western portion of Hall County, Georgia, United States, in the foothills of the Appalachian Mountains. West Hall is located about 10 miles southwest of Gainesville City, 20 miles Southwest of Dahlonega, and around 40 miles northeast of Downtown Atlanta.

The attendance boundary includes portions of Flowery Branch.

== Administration ==
- Ley Hathcock - Principal

== Demographics ==
- Hispanic- 46.3%
- White/Caucasian - 43.8%
- Black - 5.3%
- Asian - 2.4%
- Other - 2.2%

== International Baccalaureate ==
In 2008, West Hall High School established a World School for the International Baccalaureate program.

== Athletics ==
- Baseball
- Basketball
- Cheerleading
- Cross country
- Football
- Golf
- Soccer
- Softball
- Swimming
- Tennis
- Track and field
- Volleyball
- Wrestling

=== West Hall Football ===
==== Achievements ====
- Region 7-AAA Champions
  - 2014

== Arts ==
- Band
- Chorus
- Drama
- Photography
- Visual arts

== Major awards ==
- 1994 - One-Act Play State Champions
- 1996 - One-Act Play State Champions
- 2011 - One-Act Play State Champions
- 2012 - One-Act Play State Runner-Up
- 2014 - 7AAA Football Region Champions
- 2015 - 7AAA Boys Soccer Region Champions
- 2015 - AAA Boys Soccer State Champions
- 2016 - One-Act Play State Runner Up
- 2022 - 7AAA Boys Soccer Region Champions

== Notable alumni ==
- Martrez Milner (Class of 2002) - former professional football player, Atlanta Falcons
