= Jeremiah Telander =

American football player (born 2005)

No. 22 – Tennessee Volunteers
- Position: Linebacker
- Class: Senior

Personal information
- Born: February 5, 2005 (age 21)
- Listed height: 6 ft 2 in (1.88 m)
- Listed weight: 235 lb (107 kg)

Career information
- High school: Gainesville (Gainesville, Georgia)
- College: Tennessee (2023–present)
- Stats at ESPN

Jeremiah James Telander (born February 5, 2005) is an American college football linebacker for the Tennessee Volunteers. He was given the nickname "Power T" by Volunteers coach William Inge.

== Early life & high school career ==
Telander grew up in Gainesville, Georgia and attended North Hall High School before transferring to Gainesville High School as a senior. During high school, he played football, basketball, and ran track. While playing at North Hall, he earned back-to-back Region 7-AAA Defensive Player of the Year honors in 2020 and 2021. As a senior, Telander led Gainesville to a 14-1 record and an appearance in the Georgia Class 6A State Championship game, where he contributed 13 tackles, four tackles for loss, two sacks and blocked two PATs. He committed to the Vols in June 2022 after compiling more than 25 Division I offers, including 18 from Power Five programs.

Telander enrolled early and joined the Volunteers in practices for the 2022 Orange Bowl.

College recruiting
Name	Hometown	School	Height	Weight	Commit date
Jeremiah Telander; LB	Gainesville, Georgia	Gainesville	6 ft 2 in (1.88 m)	217 lb (98 kg)	Jun 26, 2022
Jeremiah Telander; LB	Recruit ratings: Rivals: 247Sports: ESPN: (81)				

== College career ==
As a freshman at Tennessee, Telander played in all 13 games as a reserve linebacker and on special teams. He led all freshman on the team in tackles with 35. The following season, he worked his way into starting role at middle linebacker and final eight games of the season, including Tennessee's first College Football Playoff berth. In 2025, he started every game and ranked second on the team with a career-best 80 total tackles.

On February 4, 2026, the Southeastern Conference (SEC) announced that Telander had been named to the 2026 SEC Football Leadership Council.

=== Statistics ===
Year	Team	Games		Tackles				Interceptions				Fumbles		
Year	Team	GP	GS	Total	Solo	Ast	Sack	PD	Int	Yds	TD	FF	FR	TD
2023	Tennessee	13	0	35	15	20	0.0	1	0	0	0	0	0	0
2024	Tennessee	13	8	43	20	23	0.5	1	0	0	0	0	3	0
2025	Tennessee	13	13	80	28	52	1.0	1	1	0	0	0	0	0
Career		39	21	158	63	95	1.5	3	1	0	0	0	3	0

== Personal life ==
Telander is the son of Steven and Angela Telander and has a sister, Grace. His father played college football at UMass before spending time as an assistant coach at Missouri, Bowling Green, UTEP and UMass.
