= Michael Gettys =

American baseball player (born 1995)

- Outfielder / Pitcher
- Born: October 22, 1995 (age 30); Gainesville, Georgia, U.S.
- Bats: Right Throws: Right

Michael Edward Gettys (born October 22, 1995) is an American former professional baseball pitcher. Listed at 6 feet 1 inch (1.85 m) and 217 pounds (98 kg), he throws and bats right-handed. Before August 2021, Gettys played as an outfielder.

== Professional career ==
=== San Diego Padres ===
Gettys attended Gainesville High School in Gainesville, Georgia. He was the Gainesville Times Player of the Year in 2012 and 2014. He committed to play college baseball for the Georgia Bulldogs. Gettys was at one point considered a potential first round pick in the 2014 Major League Baseball draft. He was drafted by the San Diego Padres in the second round, with the 51st overall selection of the draft.

Gettys made his professional debut with the rookie–level Arizona League Padres and spent the whole season there, slashing .310/.353/.437 with three home runs and 38 runs batted in (RBI) in 52 games. He spent 2015 with the Single–A Fort Wayne TinCaps and batted .231 with six home runs and 44 RBI in 122 games. In 2016, Gettys played for both Fort Wayne and the High–A Lake Elsinore Storm, posting a combined .305 batting average with 12 home runs, 60 RBI, and 33 stolen bases in 128 total games between both affiliates. Gettys returned to Lake Elsinore in 2017 where he batted .254 with 17 home runs, 51 RBI, and 22 stolen bases in 116 games, and led all minor leaguers with 500 or more plate appearances with a strikeout percentage of 37.2%. In 2018, he played for the Double–A San Antonio Missions where he hit .230 with 15 home runs, 53 RBI, and 17 stolen bases in 125 games.

Gettys spent 2019 in Triple–A with the El Paso Chihuahuas, slashing .256/.305/.517 with 31 home runs, 91 RBI, and 14 stolen bases over 128 games. He did not play in a game in 2020 due to the cancellation of the minor league season because of the COVID-19 pandemic. Gettys became a free agent on November 2, 2020.

=== Boston Red Sox ===
On November 17, 2020, Gettys signed a minor-league deal with the Boston Red Sox. Gettys began the 2021 season in Triple-A with the Worcester Red Sox, batting .201 in 46 games with five home runs and 14 RBIs. In August 2021, he began playing as a pitcher; in five relief appearances with the Florida Complex League Red Sox, he allowed two runs in five innings (3.60 ERA) while striking out five batters.

Gettys began the 2022 season in High-A with the Greenville Drive, then was promoted to the Portland Sea Dogs of Double-A. He pitched in a total of 40 games, all in relief, posting a 2.23 ERA and striking out 31 batters in 48 1/3 innings. In 2023, he began the season on the injured list with Portland. On April 20, he announced he would be undergoing surgery to address a herniated disc in his lower back. Gettys elected free agency following the season on November 6.
