= Jeremiah Ledbetter =

American football player (born 1994)

Profile
- Position: Defensive end

Personal information
- Born: May 29, 1994 (age 32); Orlando, Florida, U.S.
- Listed height: 6 ft 3 in (1.91 m)
- Listed weight: 299 lb (136 kg)

Career information
- High school: Gainesville (Gainesville, Georgia)
- College: Hutchinson CC (2012–2014); Arkansas (2015–2016)
- NFL draft: 2017: 6th round, 205th overall pick

Career history
- Detroit Lions (2017); Tampa Bay Buccaneers (2018–2019); Baltimore Ravens (2019)*; Tampa Bay Buccaneers (2019–2020); Arizona Cardinals (2021)*; Jacksonville Jaguars (2021–2024); New York Giants (2025)*
- * Offseason or practice squad member only

Awards and highlights
- Super Bowl champion (LV)

Career NFL statistics as of 2024
- Total tackles: 80
- Sacks: 3.5
- Pass deflections: 1
- Fumble recoveries: 1
- Stats at Pro Football Reference

Jeremiah Ledbetter (born May 29, 1994) is an American professional football defensive end. He played college football for the Arkansas Razorbacks.

== Early life ==
Ledbetter began his career at Olympia High School before transferring to Gainesville High School.

== College career ==
Ledbetter began his collegiate career at Hutchinson Community College in 2013, finishing there as an All-American in 2014, with 24.5 tackles for loss and 15.5 sacks. He transferred to Arkansas and stepped in right away, making 55 tackles, 7.5 for loss, and two sacks as a junior in 2015. He topped those marks as a senior in 2016, with 5.5 sacks, and was credited with 49 total tackles, 7.5 for loss.

== Professional career ==
Pre-draft measurables
Height	Weight	Arm length	Hand span	40-yard dash	10-yard split	20-yard split	20-yard shuttle	Three-cone drill	Vertical jump	Broad jump	Bench press
6 ft 3 1/8 in (1.91 m)	280 lb (127 kg)	34 1/4 in (0.87 m)	10 in (0.25 m)	4.80 s	1.67 s	2.70 s	4.56 s	7.55 s	33.5 in (0.85 m)	10 ft 8 in (3.25 m)	29 reps

=== Detroit Lions ===
The Detroit Lions selected Ledbetter in the sixth round with the 205th overall pick in the 2017 NFL draft. On May 12, 2017, the Lions signed Ledbetter to a four-year, $2.54 million contract with a signing bonus of $144,160.

On September 1, 2018, Ledbetter was waived by the Lions.

=== Tampa Bay Buccaneers (first stint) ===
On September 3, 2018, Ledbetter was signed to the Tampa Bay Buccaneers' practice squad. He was promoted to the active roster on December 19.

Ledbetter was waived/injured during final roster cuts on August 31, 2019, and reverted to the team's injured reserve list the next day. He was waived from injured reserve with an injury settlement on September 11.

=== Baltimore Ravens ===
On October 2, 2019, Ledbetter was signed to the Baltimore Ravens practice squad. He was released by the Ravens on October 21.

=== Tampa Bay Buccaneers (second stint) ===
On October 22, 2019, Ledbetter was re-signed to the Buccaneers' practice squad.

Ledbetter signed a reserve/future contract with the Buccaneers on December 30, 2019. Ledbetter was waived by the Buccaneers during final roster cuts on September 5, 2020, and was signed to the practice squad the following day. He was elevated to the active roster on October 17 for the team's week 6 game against the Green Bay Packers, and reverted to the practice squad after the game. He was signed to the active roster on December 2. In Week 16 against the Detroit Lions, Ledbetter recorded his first career sack on Chase Daniel during the 47–7 win. Ledbetter earned a Super Bowl championship when the Buccaneers won Super Bowl LV.

Ledbetter was given an exclusive-rights free agent tender by the Buccaneers on March 9, 2021. He was waived by the Buccaneers on August 31.

=== Arizona Cardinals ===
On September 3, 2021, Ledbetter was signed to the Arizona Cardinals' practice squad. He was released by the Cardinals on October 26.

=== Jacksonville Jaguars ===
On November 1, 2021, Ledbetter was signed to the Jacksonville Jaguars' practice squad. He signed a reserve/future contract with Jacksonville on January 10, 2022. Ledbetter was waived/injured by the Jaguars on August 10, and was placed on injured reserve the next day. He was released on August 22. Ledbetter was re-signed to the team's practice squad on October 12. He was signed to the active roster on December 28.

On March 8, 2024, Ledbetter re-signed with the Jaguars.

=== New York Giants ===
On March 14, 2025, Ledbetter signed with the New York Giants. He was released by New York on August 26 as part of final roster cuts.
