= North Hall High School =

Public high school in Hall County, Georgia, United States

Coordinates: 34.43058°N 83.85096°W

- 4885 Mount Vernon Road; Gainesville, Georgia 30506; United States

Information
- School type: Public
- Motto: "Providing Challenges... Envisioning Success"
- Established: 1957
- Principal: Ryan Vamplew
- Teaching staff: 76.10 (FTE)
- Grades: 9–12
- Enrollment: 1,158 (2023–2024)
- Student to teacher ratio: 15.22
- Education system: Hall County Schools
- Colors: Green and white
- Athletics conference: GHSA Region 7-AAA
- Mascot: Trojan
- Rivals: Chestatee High School
- Newspaper: The Forum
- Yearbook: The Trojan
- Website: North Hall High School

North Hall High School is a public four-year comprehensive high school in the northern portion of Hall County, Georgia, United States, in the foothills of the Appalachian Mountains. North Hall serves Murrayville, Clermont, and portions of Gainesville. The school is about 10 miles north of Gainesville, 15 miles south of Dahlonega and 65 miles northeast of Atlanta.

== History ==
Around 5:25 am on March 20, 1998, an F-3 tornado (see Fujita scale) hit northern sections of Hall County. It did heavy damage, killing 12 and leveling several structures. It became known as the "Pre-Dawn Killer". The tornado heavily damaged nearby Lanier Elementary School, before unroofing the high school. A 10 year anniversary memorial was held in 2008 with the school principal at the time of the tornado speaking about his experiences.

In September 2024, the school was one of several in Hall County, Georgia where students had been arrested for making threats against the school.

In March 2026, a math teacher at the school was reportedly accidentally killed during a prank as five teenagers toilet papered his home. After he exited his home after discovering the prank, the teacher tripped and fell into the road before he was run over by the teenagers as they attempted to flee. The teenagers stopped and administered assistance after the accident. The teenagers were initially charged, however the family requested for the charges to be dropped.

== Adjacent schools ==
- North – White County High School
- South – Gainesville High School
- East – East Hall High School
- West – Lumpkin County High School
- Southwest – Chestatee High School

== Academics ==
In 2010, North Hall was recognized statewide when Georgia Governor Sonny Perdue made a visit to recognize the 95% graduation rate achievement reached by the school. North Hall is a qualified International Baccalaureate school, meaning that it offers students the ability to earn an International Baccalaureate diploma.

== School enrollment and demographics ==
=== Total students ===
- 1,123 (as of 2020–2021)
- 1,122 (as of 2018–2019)
- 1,138 (as of 2021–2022)
- 1,158 (as of 2025-2026)

=== By gender ===
- Male – 609
- Female – 529

=== By grade ===
- 9 – 351
- 10 – 306
- 11 – 265
- 12 – 216

=== By race ===
- White – 924
- Hispanic – 183
- Black – 8
- Asian – 6
- Native Hawaiian/Pacific Islander – 1
- American Indian/Alaska Native – 0
- Two or More Races – 16

== Feeder schools ==
=== Middle schools ===
- North Hall Middle School

=== Elementary schools ===
- Mt. Vernon Exploratory Academy
- Riverbend Advanced Scholars Academy
- Wauka Mountain Multiple Intelligences Academy

== Athletics ==
- Baseball
- Basketball, men's and ladies'
- Cross country
- Football
- Golf, men's and ladies'
- Soccer, men's and ladies'
- Softball
- Swimming
- Tennis, men's and ladies'
- Track and field
- Volleyball
- Wrestling

== Band ==
The North Hall Band program consists of a marching band, symphonic band, concert band, jazz band, winter guard, indoor drumline, and several smaller ensembles.

=== Marching band ===
The Marching Trojan Band competes in competitions during the fall season as well as the annual Hall County Marching Exhibition.

== Notable alumni ==
- Doug Collins – politician, United States Secretary of Veterans Affairs
- Jody Davis – former catcher for Chicago Cubs and Atlanta Braves baseball teams
- Corey Hulsey – former NFL Oakland Raiders football player
- Dan Jackson – college football defensive back for the Georgia Bulldogs
- James Jarrard – United States Army Major General and current Chief of Staff, United States Indo-Pacific Command
- Reese Olson - Pitcher for the MLB Detroit Tigers
