= E. E. Butler High School =

Segregated school in Gainesville, Georgia, United States

Information
- Established: 1962
- Closed: 1969
- Mascot: Tiger

E. E. Butler High School was a segregated school for black students in Gainesville, Georgia that opened in 1962 when Federal courts declared the existing system unequal. After integration of the public schools, Butler was closed in 1969 as it was considered inadequate for White students.

The athletic teams were known as the Tigers.

== History ==
The school was named for Emmett Ethridge Butler, the first Black doctor in Hall County. When Butler opened in 1962, Fair Street High School students were moved to the modern building on Athens Street. When it closed in 1969, students were merged into the previously all-White Gainesville High School.
