= Brad Keller (baseball) =

American baseball player (born 1995)

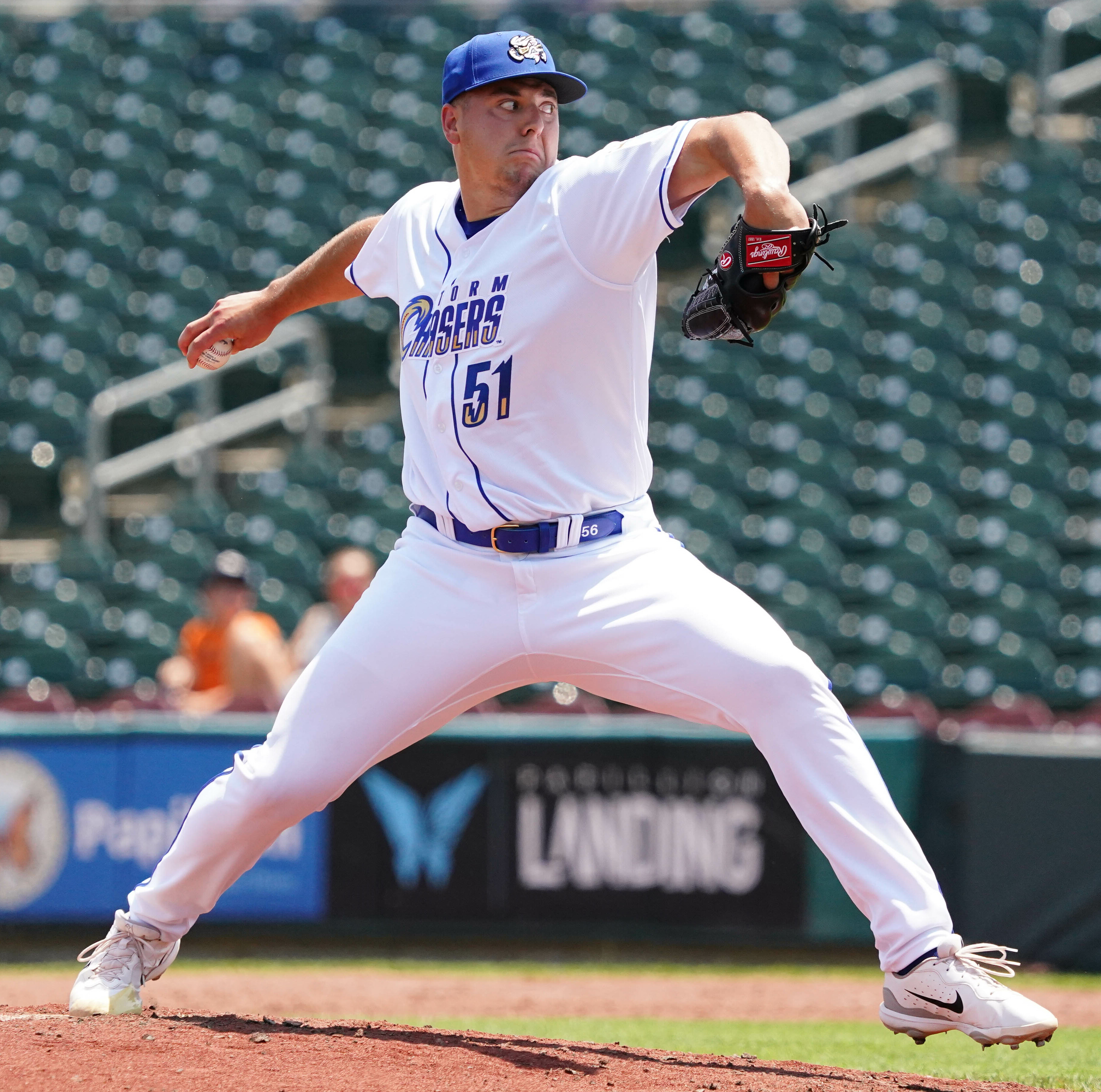
- Keller with the Omaha Storm Chasers in 2023

Philadelphia Phillies – No. 40
- Pitcher
- Born: July 27, 1995 (age 31); Snellville, Georgia, U.S.
- Bats: Right Throws: Right

MLB debut
- March 29, 2018, for the Kansas City Royals

MLB statistics (through 2026 season)
- Win–loss record: 44–60
- Earned run average: 4.13
- Strikeouts: 645
- Stats at Baseball Reference

Teams
- Kansas City Royals (2018–2023); Chicago White Sox (2024); Boston Red Sox (2024); Chicago Cubs (2025); Philadelphia Phillies (2026–present)
Medals
Men's baseball
Representing United States
World Baseball Classic
Silver medal – second place	2026 Miami	Team

Brad Michael Keller (born July 27, 1995) is an American professional baseball pitcher for the Philadelphia Phillies of Major League Baseball (MLB). He has previously played in MLB for the Kansas City Royals, Chicago White Sox, Boston Red Sox, and Chicago Cubs. He made his MLB debut with the Royals in 2018.

== Amateur career ==
Keller attended Flowery Branch High School in Flowery Branch, Georgia, playing for their baseball team, the Falcons. He was drafted by the Arizona Diamondbacks in the eighth round of the 2013 MLB draft. He had committed to play college baseball at Presbyterian College, but chose to sign with the Diamondbacks rather than attend college.

== Professional career ==
=== Arizona Diamondbacks ===
Keller made his professional debut that year with the Arizona League Diamondbacks and was later promoted to the Missoula Osprey. In 15 games (13 starts), he posted a 7–3 record and 2.44 earned run average (ERA). In 2014, he pitched for the Arizona League Diamondbacks, Missoula and Hillsboro Hops, going 6–4 with a 4.31 ERA over 15 games (12 starts). Keller pitched for the Kane County Cougars in 2015, going 8–9 with a 2.60 ERA over 26 games (25 starts), the Visalia Rawhide in 2016 where he went 9–7 with a 4.47 ERA in 24 starts, and 2017 with the Jackson Generals, where he posted a 10–9 record and 4.68 ERA in 26 starts.

=== Kansas City Royals ===
On December 14, 2017, the Cincinnati Reds selected Keller in the Rule 5 draft and immediately traded him to the Kansas City Royals for cash.

Keller made the 25-man roster for the Royals in 2018 and made his MLB debut on Opening Day, March 29, pitching an inning of scoreless relief against the Chicago White Sox. He struck out the first batter he faced, Adam Engel. He split time between the bullpen and the rotation, leading the team in ERA (3.08) and tied for first on the team in wins (9). He struck out 96 batters in 140 1/3 innings. On April 19, 2019, Keller was suspended for five games after throwing a pitch that hit Tim Anderson of the White Sox.

On July 7, 2020, it was announced that Keller had tested positive for COVID-19. Ten days later, he was cleared to return to the Royals’ Summer Camp after producing two negative tests at least 24 hours apart. On September 13, Keller pitched the first complete game shutout of his career against the Pittsburgh Pirates, allowing five hits (only one for extra bases) and one walk, striking out two batters. With the 2020 Kansas City Royals, Keller appeared in nine games, compiling a 5–3 record with 2.47 ERA and 35 strikeouts in 54 2/3 innings pitched. In 2021, he started 26 games and posted an 8–12 record, a 5.39 ERA and 120 strikeouts in 133 2/3 innings.

On August 18, 2022, Keller was moved to the bullpen after struggling to begin the year. On September 22, he tossed a scoreless ninth inning against the Minnesota Twins to earn his first career save. In 35 appearances (22 games), he pitched to a 6-14 record and 5.09 ERA with 102 strikeouts in 139 2/3 innings of work.

On May 19, 2023, after nine starts, Keller was placed on the injured list with right shoulder impingement syndrome. On August 16, he was transferred to the 60-day injured list. He was activated from the injured list on September 9. He became a free agent on November 2.

=== Chicago White Sox ===
On March 8, 2024, Keller signed a minor-league contract with the Chicago White Sox. After three starts for the Triple-A Charlotte Knights, the White Sox added Keller to their major-league roster on April 28. On May 14, the White Sox announced that Keller would be moved to the rotation to assume the spot vacated by Michael Soroka. However, he was designated for assignment on May 20. In five games (two starts) for the White Sox, Keller logged a 4.86 ERA with 13 strikeouts in 16 2/3 innings. He elected free agency on May 22.

=== Boston Red Sox ===
On May 26, 2024, Keller signed a major-league contract with the Boston Red Sox. In 10 games for the Red Sox, he compiled a 5.66 ERA with 17 strikeouts and 1 save across 20 2/3 innings pitched. On August 13, Keller rejected an optional assignment to the Triple-A Worcester Red Sox and elected free agency. The next day, he re-signed with Boston on a minor-league contract. He had his contract selected to the major league roster a second time on August 26. Keller gave up 5 runs (3 earned) in a start against the Toronto Blue Jays before he was designated for assignment again on August 27. He elected free agency once more on August 29. On September 1, Keller re-signed with the Red Sox organization on a minor league contract. He elected free agency on November 2.

=== Chicago Cubs ===
On January 29, 2025, Keller signed a minor league contract with the Chicago Cubs. On March 27, the Cubs selected Keller's contract after he made the team's Opening Day roster. He made 68 appearances (including one start) for Chicago during the regular season, compiling a 4-2 record and 2.07 ERA with 75 strikeouts and three saves across 69 2/3 innings pitched.

=== Philadelphia Phillies ===
On December 18, 2025, Keller signed a two-year, $22 million contract with the Philadelphia Phillies, which included a $4 million signing bonus.

On July 16, 2026, it was announced that Keller had suffered a torn UCL in his right elbow. He underwent reconstructive surgery with an internal brace—an alternative to the traditional Tommy John surgery—on July 28. Keller's recovery is projected to sideline him until late in the 2027 season or the beginning of the 2028 season.

== See also ==
- Rule 5 draft results
