= Dan Jackson (defensive back) =

American football player (born 2000)

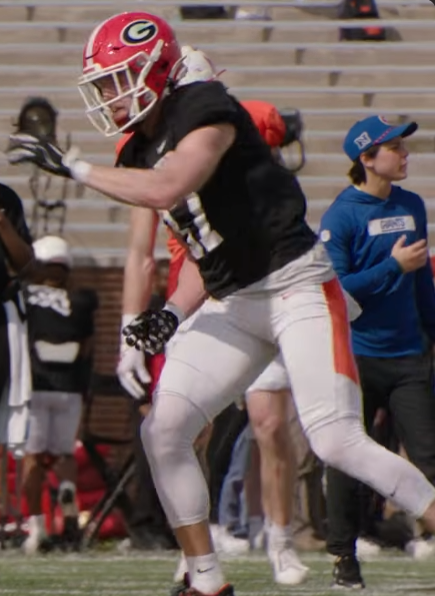
- Jackson with Georgia at the 2025 Senior Bowl

Louisville Kings
- Position: Safety
- Roster status: Unsigned draft pick

Personal information
- Born: November 30, 2000 (age 25); Gainesville, Georgia, U.S.
- Listed height: 6 ft 1 in (1.85 m)
- Listed weight: 195 lb (88 kg)

Career information
- High school: North Hall (Gainesville)
- College: Georgia (2019–2024)
- NFL draft: 2025: 7th round, 230th overall pick

Career history
- Detroit Lions (2025); Louisville Kings (2027-present)

Awards and highlights
- 2× CFP national champion (2021, 2022); Third-team All-SEC (2024)
- Stats at Pro Football Reference

Daniel Warren Jackson (born November 30, 2000) is an American professional football safety. He played college football for the Georgia Bulldogs and was selected by the Lions in the seventh round of the 2025 NFL draft.

== Early life ==
Jackson attended North Hall High School in Gainesville, Georgia. As a senior, Jackson played both running back and defensive back, totaling 1,785 all-purpose yards, 26 touchdowns, and four interceptions. He decided to walk-on at the University of Georgia, following his high school career.

== College career ==
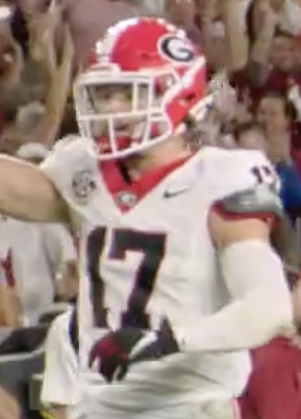
Jackson with the Georgia Bulldogs in 2024

After redshirting and being a member of the scout team for his first two years on campus, Jackson earned significant playing time in 2021. Against Arkansas, he blocked a punt, leading to a touchdown, before leading the team in tackles the following week. Jackson finished the 2021 season with over 35 tackles, becoming a leader on Georgia's defense. The following season, he played in seven games, recording 16 tackles, an interception, a forced fumble, and a pass breakup before his season was prematurely ended due to injury.

In 2023, Jackson returned from his injury, playing in the season opener against UT Martin. He finished the season with 20 tackles, a forced fumble, and an interception before announcing that he would return to Georgia in 2024. In 2024, against rival Georgia Tech, Jackson forced a fumble late in the fourth quarter, giving Georgia the ball in Yellow Jacket territory down by seven points. Georgia capitalized on the turnover, going on to eventually win in eight overtimes by a score of 44–42. He ended his year having appeared in all 14 games with 13 being starts. He totaled 64 tackles, three passes defended, and two interceptions. He was selected third-team All-SEC (Southeastern Conference) at the end of the year.

== Professional career ==
Pre-draft measurables
Height	Weight	Arm length	Hand span	Wingspan	40-yard dash	10-yard split	20-yard split	20-yard shuttle	Three-cone drill	Vertical jump	Broad jump
6 ft 0 1/8 in (1.83 m)	194 lb (88 kg)	29 7/8 in (0.76 m)	8 3/4 in (0.22 m)	6 ft 1 1/8 in (1.86 m)	4.46 s	1.54 s	2.64 s	4.36 s	7.12 s	34.0 in (0.86 m)	10 ft 3 in (3.12 m)
All values from Pro Day

Jackson was selected by the Detroit Lions with the 230th overall pick in the seventh round of the 2025 NFL draft. He was placed on season–ending injured reserve on August 4, 2025.

On August 30, 2026, Jackson was waived by the Lions as a part of final roster cuts.
