= White County School District =

School district in Georgia (U.S. state)

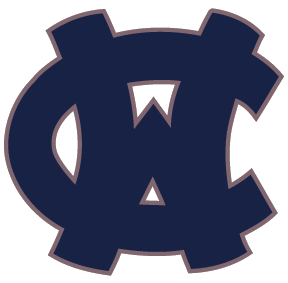

Address
- 136 Warriors Path Cleveland, Georgia, 30528; United States
- Coordinates: 34.600730°N 83.767490°W

District information
- Grades: Pre-kindergarten – 12
- Superintendent: Laurie Burkett
- Accreditation(s): Southern Association of Colleges and Schools; Georgia Accrediting Commission

Students and staff
- Enrollment: 3,827 (2022–23)
- Faculty: 261.10 (FTE)

Other information
- Telephone: (706) 865-2315
- Fax: (706) 865-7784
- Website: white.k12.ga.us

The White County School District is a public school district in White County, Georgia, United States, based in Cleveland, Georgia. It serves the communities of Cleveland and Helen.

== Schools ==
The White County School District has four elementary schools, one middle school, one high school, and one building used for night school.

=== Elementary schools ===
- Jack P. Nix Elementary School
- Mossy Creek Elementary School
- Mount Yonah Elementary School
- Tesnatee Gap Elementary School

=== Middle school ===
- White County Middle School

=== Night School ===
- Mountain Education

=== High school ===
- White County High School
