= Warren County School District (Georgia) =

School district in Georgia (U.S. state)

Address
- 115 Gibson Hwy. Warrenton, Georgia, 30828-8402; United States
- Coordinates: 33.40755°N 82.668257°W

District information
- Grades: Pre-school - 12
- Superintendent: Carole Jean Carey
- Accreditation(s): Southern Association of Colleges and Schools; Georgia Accrediting Commission

Students and staff
- Enrollment: 894
- Faculty: 70

Other information
- Telephone: (706) 465-3383
- Fax: (706) 465-9141
- Website: www.warren.k12.ga.us

The Warren County School District is a public school district in Warren County, Georgia, United States, based in Warrenton. It serves the communities of Camak, Jewell, Norwood, and Warren.

== Schools ==
The Warren County School District has one elementary school, one middle school, and one high school.

=== Elementary schools ===
- Mildred E. Freeman Elementary School

=== Middle school ===
- Warren County Middle School

=== High school ===
- Warren County High School
