= Buford City School District =

School district in Georgia (U.S. state)

Address
- 2625 Sawnee Avenue Buford, Georgia, 30518-2514; United States
- Coordinates: 34.128769°N 83.982238°W

District information
- Grades: Pre-school - 12
- Superintendent: Melanie Reed
- Accreditation(s): Southern Association of Colleges and Schools; Georgia Accrediting Commission
- NCES District ID: 1300600

Students and staff
- Students: 5,468 (2020-2021)
- Teachers: 322.20 (FTE)
- Student–teacher ratio: 16.97
- District mascot: Wolves
- Colors: Kelly green, vegas gold, and white

Other information
- Telephone: (770) 945-5035
- Website: http://www.bufordcityschools.org

The Buford City School District is a school district in Gwinnett County, Georgia, United States. The Georgia Department of Education announced Buford Academy as a 2014 Highest-Performing School. Buford City Schools (BCSS) serves approximately 5,000 students in a campus-like setting of five schools, two performing arts centers, and a multi-purpose arena. In October 2020, Niche again named BCS the Number One School District in Georgia—an honor that has been bestowed upon the district for six consecutive years.

The district includes the city of Buford; it is partially in Gwinnett County and partially in Hall County.

== Schools ==
- Buford Elementary School
- Buford Academy
- Buford Senior Academy
- Buford Middle School
- Buford High School

== Superintendent Resignation after Use of Racist Term ==
Dr. Geye Hamby was put on administrative leave on August 21, 2018, after recordings surfaced in which a person (allegedly Hamby) repeatedly and casually used the "n-word." Hamby resigned on August 24, 2018, as a result of the recordings.

== See also ==
- List of school districts in Georgia (U.S. state)
