= Flowery Branch, Georgia =

City in Georgia, United States

- City
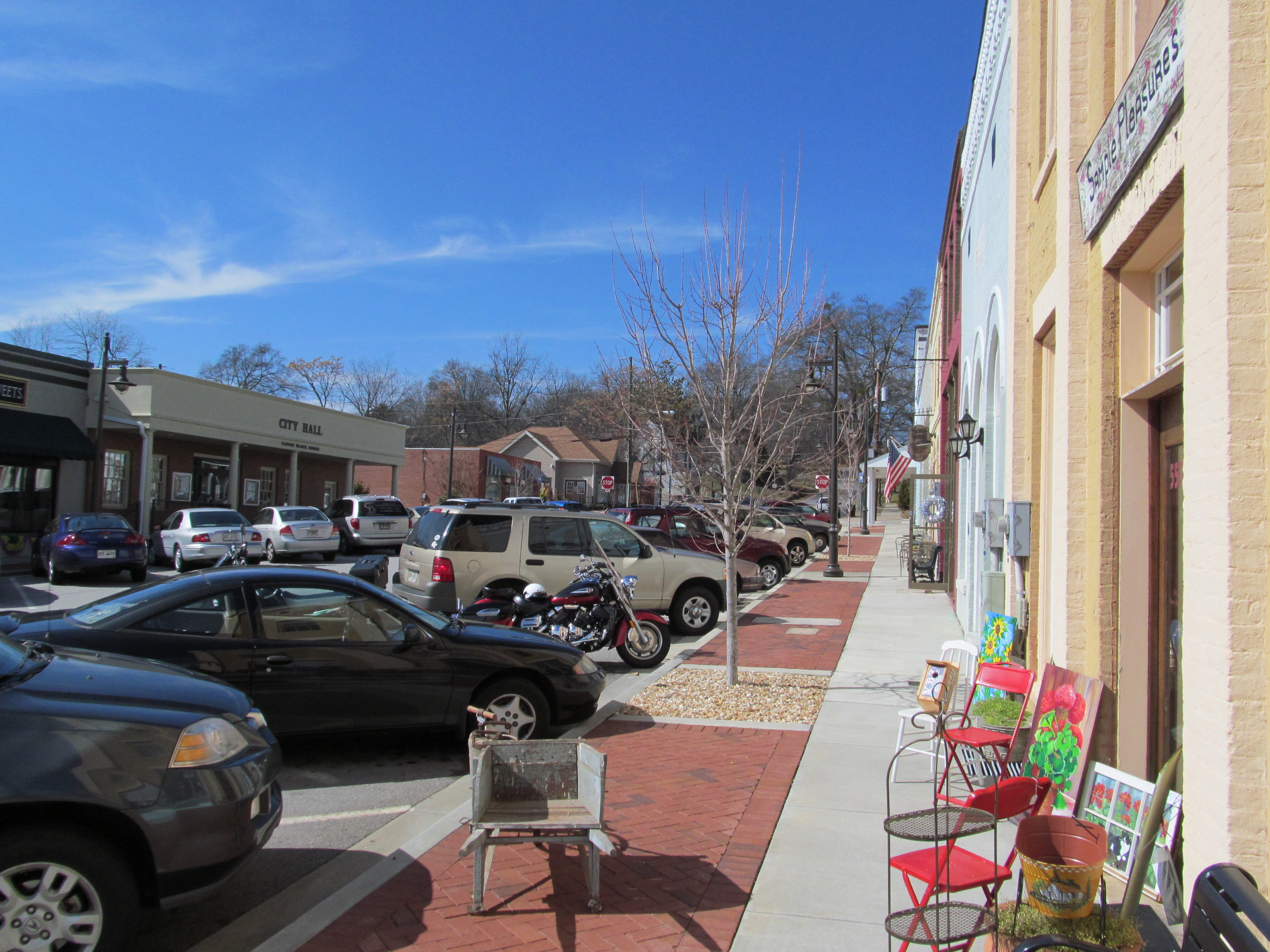
- Main Street in 2012

- Logo

- Location in Hall County and the state of Georgia
- Coordinates: 34°10′35″N 83°54′41″W
- Country: United States
- State: Georgia
- County: Hall
- Established: 1874; 152 years ago

Government
  - Mayor: Ed Asbridge (R)

Area
  - Total: 7.24 sq mi (18.74 km^{2})
  - Land: 7.12 sq mi (18.44 km^{2})
  - Water: 0.12 sq mi (0.30 km^{2})
- Elevation: 1,175 ft (358 m)

Population (2020)
  - Total: 9,391
  - Density: 1,318.9/sq mi (509.22/km^{2})
- Time zone: UTC−5 (Eastern (EST))
  - Summer (DST): UTC−4 (EDT)
- ZIP code: 30542
- Area code: 770
- FIPS code: 13-30340
- GNIS feature ID: 2403624
- Website: flowerybranchga.org

Flowery Branch is a city in Hall County, Georgia, United States. As of the 2020 census, the city had a population of 9,391. It is part of the Gainesville, Georgia metropolitan area, and lies on the shores of Lake Lanier. It is most known for being the city in which the Atlanta Falcons facilities are headquartered.

== History ==
Flowery Branch was established in 1874, one year after the Richmond and Danville Air-Line Railroad Railway System built a rail line through the city connecting Charlotte to Atlanta. The city hosts the Historic Caboose exhibit and the Historic Train Depot museum.

Flowery Branch was originally named Anaguluskee, a Cherokee Indian word meaning "flowers on the branch". Other sources claim the original name was Nattagasska ("Blossom Creek"), which long-term residents recall as an alternative nickname for the town.

Andrew Jackson passed through Flowery Branch on his way to the First Seminole War in 1818. The historic Bowman-Pirkle House, built that same year, was originally located on the border of Flowery Branch and Buford.

Part of the historic Old Federal Road is in Flowery Branch. It was an important route through northern Georgia in the early to mid-1800s. Its most obvious significance lay in four issues: the early history of Cherokee-U.S. social, economic, and cultural relations in the early 1800s; the eventual use of the Road as part of the Trail of Tears; use of the Road during the Georgia Gold Rush; and Union and Confederate use of the Road during the campaigns for Chickamauga in 1863 and Atlanta in 1864.

Ferdinand de Soto entered Hall County in March 1540 in transit between Stone Mountain and the Conasauga River.

== Geography ==
According to the United States Census Bureau, the town has a total area of 6.32 square miles (16.4 km^{2}), of which 6.32 square miles (16.4 km^{2}) is land and 0.40% is water.

Flowery Branch is within the Brevard Fault zone.

Natural resources in the Flowery Branch area include: gray marble, marble, clay, granite, graphite, limestone, iron ore, manganese, pegmatite, mica, beryl, quartzite, zircon, lead, copper, silver, and gold as known by the local Gold Hill Mine and regional popularity of The Hall County Gold Belt prospected during the Georgia Gold Rush. Pyrite is also abundant in the region. Other resources located within the near vicinity of Flowery Branch include: asbestos, corundum, sand, and precious gems such as diamond and ruby.

Flowery Branch borders Chestnut Mountain and Oakwood. City limits are 1 mile (1.6 km) from Gainesville and Braselton. Flowery Branch is on the shores of Lake Lanier.

== Demographics ==
Historical population
Census	Pop.	Note	%±
1880	289		—
1890	350		21.1%
1900	420		20.0%
1910	373		−11.2%
1920	461		23.6%
1930	418		−9.3%
1940	506		21.1%
1950	610		20.6%
1960	741		21.5%
1970	779		5.1%
1980	755		−3.1%
1990	1,251		65.7%
2000	1,806		44.4%
2010	5,679		214.5%
2020	9,391		65.4%
2025 (est.)	13,110	▲	39.6%
U.S. Decennial Census; 2025

=== 2020 census ===
As of the 2020 census, Flowery Branch had a population of 9,391. The median age was 37.0 years. 24.4% of residents were under the age of 18 and 13.8% of residents were 65 years of age or older. For every 100 females there were 92.2 males, and for every 100 females age 18 and over there were 89.0 males age 18 and over.

100.0% of residents lived in urban areas, while 0.0% lived in rural areas.

There were 3,652 households in Flowery Branch, of which 36.5% had children under the age of 18 living in them. Of all households, 53.0% were married-couple households, 15.7% were households with a male householder and no spouse or partner present, and 25.9% were households with a female householder and no spouse or partner present. About 22.7% of all households were made up of individuals and 7.0% had someone living alone who was 65 years of age or older. There were 1,862 families residing in the city.

There were 3,944 housing units, of which 7.4% were vacant. The homeowner vacancy rate was 3.9% and the rental vacancy rate was 6.9%.

Flowery Branch racial composition
Race	Num.	Perc.
White (non-Hispanic)	6,580	70.07%
Black or African American (non-Hispanic)	810	8.63%
Native American	24	0.26%
Asian	363	3.87%
Pacific Islander	2	0.02%
Other/mixed	417	4.44%
Hispanic or Latino	1,195	12.72%

=== 2000 census ===
As of the census of 2000, there were 1,806 people, 706 households, and 475 families residing in the town. The population density was 725.3 inhabitants per square mile (280.0/km^{2}). There were 820 housing units at an average density of 329.3 per square mile (127.1/km^{2}). The racial makeup of the town was 80.22% White, 10.18% African American, 0.44% Native American, 0.28% Asian, 2.21% from other races, and 0.66% from two or more races. Hispanic or Latino people of any race were 9.69% of the population.

There were 706 households, out of which 33.3% had children under the age of 18 living with them, 43.6% were married couples living together, 17.0% had a female householder with no husband present, and 32.6% were non-families. 23.8% of all households were made up of individuals, and 7.1% had someone living alone who was 65 years of age or older. The average household size was 2.56 and the average family size was 3.01.

In the town, the age distribution of the population shows 25.7% under the age of 18, 12.1% from 18 to 24, 35.4% from 25 to 44, 18.1% from 45 to 64, and 8.6% who were 65 years of age or older. The median age was 31 years. For every 100 females, there were 103.4 males. For every 100 females age 18 and over, there were 96.3 males.

The median income for a household in the town was $35,478, and the median income for a family was $38,500. Males had a median income of $29,572 versus $21,382 for females. The per capita income for the town was $16,970. About 9.5% of families and 13.3% of the population were below the poverty line, including 13.1% of those under age 18 and 21.6% of those age 65 or over.

== Economy ==
The Atlanta Falcons football team's training camp has been located in Flowery Branch since the start of the 2005 season.

King's Hawaiian operates a 116,000 ft^{2} (10,800 m^{2}) bakery and distribution center in Flowery Branch.

Wrigley's, a subsidiary of Mars, Incorporated, manufactures chewing gum products including Juicy Fruit, Orbit, Extra, and 5 in Flowery Branch.

== Education ==
Public education in Flowery Branch is administered by Hall County Schools. Part of the city is zoned to Flowery Branch Elementary School, West Hall Middle School, and West Hall High School. Another part is zoned to Spout Springs Elementary School, Davis Middle School, and Flowery Branch High School.

== In popular culture ==
Films and movies filmed in Flowery Branch include Ozark and Blended.

== Notable people ==
- Andrew Jannakos, singer-songwriter, known for "Gone Too Soon"
- Brad Keller, baseball player
- Phil Niekro, pitcher, MLB Hall of Fame
- Connor Shaw, football player
- John-Allison Weiss, singer-songwriter
- Joe South, singer-songwriter and guitarist
