= List of charter schools in Georgia =

The following is a list of charter schools in Georgia (including networks of such schools) grouped by county.

== Statewide Locations ==
- Coastal Plains Education Center High School (17 schools)

== Bibb County ==
- Academy for Classical Education
- Cirrus Academy Charter School

== Bulloch County ==
- Statesboro STEAM College, Careers, Art & Technology Academy

== Calhoun County ==
- Pataula Charter Academy

== Cherokee County ==
- Cherokee Charter Academy

== Clarke County ==
- Foothills Education Charter High School

== Clayton County ==
- DuBois Integrity Academy
- Utopian Academy for the Arts

== Cobb County ==
- International Academy of Smyrna
- Miles Ahead Charter School
- Northwest Classical Academy

== Columbia County ==
- SAIL - School for Arts Infused Learning

== Coweta County ==
- Coweta Charter Academy
- Odyssey School

== Decatur County ==
- Spring Creek Charter Academy

== DeKalb County ==
- The Community Academy for Architecture and Design (TCAAD)
- Dekalb Brilliance Academy
- Georgia Fugees Academy Charter School
- PEACE Academy Charter School
- Spring Creek Charter Academy

== Douglas County ==
- Delta STEAM Academy
- DREAM Academy Charter School
- Zest Preparatory Academy Charter School

== Fayette County ==
- Liberty Tech Charter School

== Fulton County ==
- Amana Academy
- Atlanta Classical Academy
- Atlanta Heights Charter School
- Atlanta SMART Academy
- Atlanta Unbound Academy
- Destination Career Academy of Georgia
- Ethos Classical School
- Fulton Leadership Academy
- Genesis Academy (Boys, Girls)
- Georgia Cyber Academy
- International Charter School of Atlanta
- Ivy Preparatory Academy
- Liberation Academy
- Resurgence Hall Charter School
- Savannah Exploratory Academy
- SLAM Academy of Atlanta

== Gwinnett County ==
- Brookhaven Innovation Academy
- Georgia Connections Academy
- International Charter Academy of Georgia
- Yi Hwang Academy of Language Excellence

== Lowndes County ==
- Scintilla Charter Academy

== Mitchell County ==
- Baconton Community Charter School

== Randolph County ==
- Southwest Georgia STEM Charter Academy

== Richmond County ==
- Georgia School for Innovation & the Classics

== Sumter County ==
- Furlow Charter School

== White County ==
- Mountain Education Charter High School
