= Johnson High School (Gainesville, Georgia) =

Location
- 3305 Poplar Springs; Gainesville, Georgia 30507; United States; 34°13′29″N 83°51′13″W

Information
- Type: Public
- Established: 1972
- School district: Hall County Schools
- Principal: Jonathan Edwards
- Teaching staff: 90.40 (FTE)
- Grades: 9 to 12
- Enrollment: 1,318 (2024–2025)
- Student to teacher ratio: 14.58
- Colors: Columbia blue, navy and white
- Mascot: Knights
- Rivals: Gainesville High School; Flowery Branch High School; West Hall High School
- Affiliations: International Baccalaureate
- Website: Johnson High School

Robert Wood Johnson High School is a public high school located in Gainesville, Georgia, United States, operated by the Hall County School District. The school serves 1,600 students in grades 9 to 12.

== History ==
Robert Wood Johnson High School was built in 1972 by the Hall County Board of Education under the direction of Superintendent Dean Myers. The school is named after the Johnson & Johnson Corporation's founder; the corporation owned a large piece of land in South Hall County and gave a small piece to the Board of Education as long as they in turn would name the school Robert Wood Johnson High School. The school at one time was called Robert Wood Johnson Memorial Comprehensive High School.

Johnson High School added a vocational wing in 1973.

The school's first principal was Donald Loggins.

In 1982 the Frank J. Knight Center was dedicated. This is home to many PE classes, basketball, volleyball, and school assemblies.

In 1990 a stadium was built for football and soccer. Nicknamed "The Dungeon," the official name of the facility is "Billy Ellis Memorial Stadium," after a former principal who died of cancer.

In 1996, the Performing Arts Center was built between the main building and the Frank J. Knight Center. This building is home to drama classes and chorus and band performances, and is referred to as the PAC.

== Athletics ==
Boys Soccer

The school has seen success in its soccer program, winning state titles in 2018, 2022, 2023, and 2025.

The 2014 season marked the first time the school had ever gone to a state championship in any sport, but in the final they lost 2-0 to Dalton High School.

The 2016 season was Johnson's second title shot when the Knights advanced to the class 4A state finals only to be dispatched by St. Pius in a 3-0 loss.

The 2018 season was capped off with the Class 5A boys soccer finals against defending state champion McIntosh with a 1-0 victory over the Chiefs that captured the program's first-ever state title.

Johnson’s bid for a second Class 5A state title in 2021 came to an end as in a rematch of the 2018 Class 5A final, McIntosh scored twice in the final 13 minutes to erase an early Johnson lead en route to a 2-1 victory in the state championship.

In 2022, Johnson captured its 2nd 5A title after a come-from-behind 4-2 win over St. Pius in the Class 5A state championship match. It was their second 5A title in five seasons and their fifth appearance in a state championship game since 2014. It also avenged a 2-1 loss to McIntosh in the 2021 title match on the very same field.

The 2023 season was marked by its attempt to go back to back for the first time in the school's history. Johnson went on to go undefeated the regular season and in the final a 4-2 win over Westminster sealed the Class 4A state championship. The title was the second straight for the Knights (21-0), who won the Class 5A title in 2022. After the season was when for the first time in school history, the Johnson High school boys' soccer team were declared national champions for the first time ever by the United Soccer Coaches poll.

In 2024 Johnson campaigned for the three-peat and went 18-2-1 with an undefeated record in region play (10-0), However their state championship pursuit would be stopped short by Westminster in the Class 4A state, losing 2-0. This loss was the first time the team was shut out in over 2 years

In 2025, after losing more than a dozen players from the previous year's state runner-up squad and started the season 1-2, matching their total number of losses from the previous two years in just three games, the team rallied finishing the regular season on an 11-2 run. The playoffs were a display of pure defensive dominance, as the Knights allowed just two goals over five games. In the final, Johnson scored a goal with just six minutes left in the match, leading Johnson to a 1-0 win over Northwest Whitfield in the Class 3A boys soccer championship match at McEachern High School’s Cantrell Stadium.

== Feeder schools ==
- Chestnut Mountain Elementary School
- Chicopee Woods Elementary School
- Lyman Hall Elementary School
- Martin Elementary School
- Myers Elementary School
- South Hall Middle School
- Sugar Hill Elementary School

== Notable alumni ==
- Casey Cagle, Lt. Governor of Georgia, 2007-2019
- A.J. Styles, professional wrestler
- Chester Willis, former NFL football player
- Mike "MoonPie" Wilson, former NFL football player
