= Murrayville, Georgia =

- Unincorporated community
- Location within Georgia Location within the United States
- Coordinates: 34°25′07″N 83°54′21″W
- Country: United States
- State: Georgia
- County: Hall
- Elevation: 1,283 ft (391 m)
- Time zone: UTC-5 (Eastern (EST))
  - Summer (DST): UTC-4 (EDT)
- ZIP code: 30564
- Area codes: 770, 678, 470
- GNIS feature ID: 332457

Murrayville is an unincorporated community in Hall County, Georgia, United States. The community is located along Georgia State Route 60, 9.6 miles (15.4 km) north-northwest of Gainesville. Murrayville has a post office with ZIP code 30564.

The community was named after Patrick J. Murray, a local merchant.
