= Gainesville City School District =

School district in Georgia (U.S. state)

Address
- 508 Oak Street Gainesville, Georgia, 30501-3576; United States
- Coordinates: 34.300833°N 83.832778°W

District information
- Grades: Pre-kindergarten – 12
- Superintendent: Jeremy H. Williams
- Accreditations: Southern Association of Colleges and Schools; Georgia Accrediting Commission

Students and staff
- Enrollment: 7,974 (2022–23)
- Faculty: 509.20 (FTE)
- Staff: 463.40 (FTE)
- Student–teacher ratio: 15.66

Other information
- Telephone: (770) 536-5275
- Fax: (770) 287-2004
- Website: gcssk12.net

The Gainesville City School District is a public school district in Hall County, Georgia, United States, based in Gainesville. It serves most of the city of Gainesville, along with a few unincorporated areas of Hall County.

== Schools ==
The Gainesville City School District has five elementary schools, two middle schools, and one high school.

=== Elementary schools ===
- Centennial Arts Academy
- Enota MI Academy
- Fair Street International Academy
- Gainesville Exploration Academy
- New Holland Leadership Academy
- Mundy Mill Arts Academy

=== Middle school ===
- Gainesville Middle School East
- Gainesville Middle School West

=== High school ===
- Gainesville High School

=== Alternative education ===
- Horizon Academy (grade 9–12) – for high school students at risk of not graduating
