= White County High School (Cleveland, Georgia) =

Public high school in Cleveland, Georgia, United States

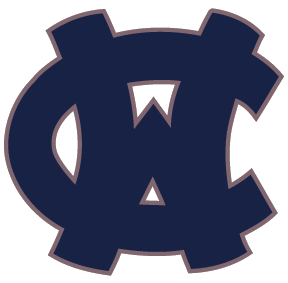

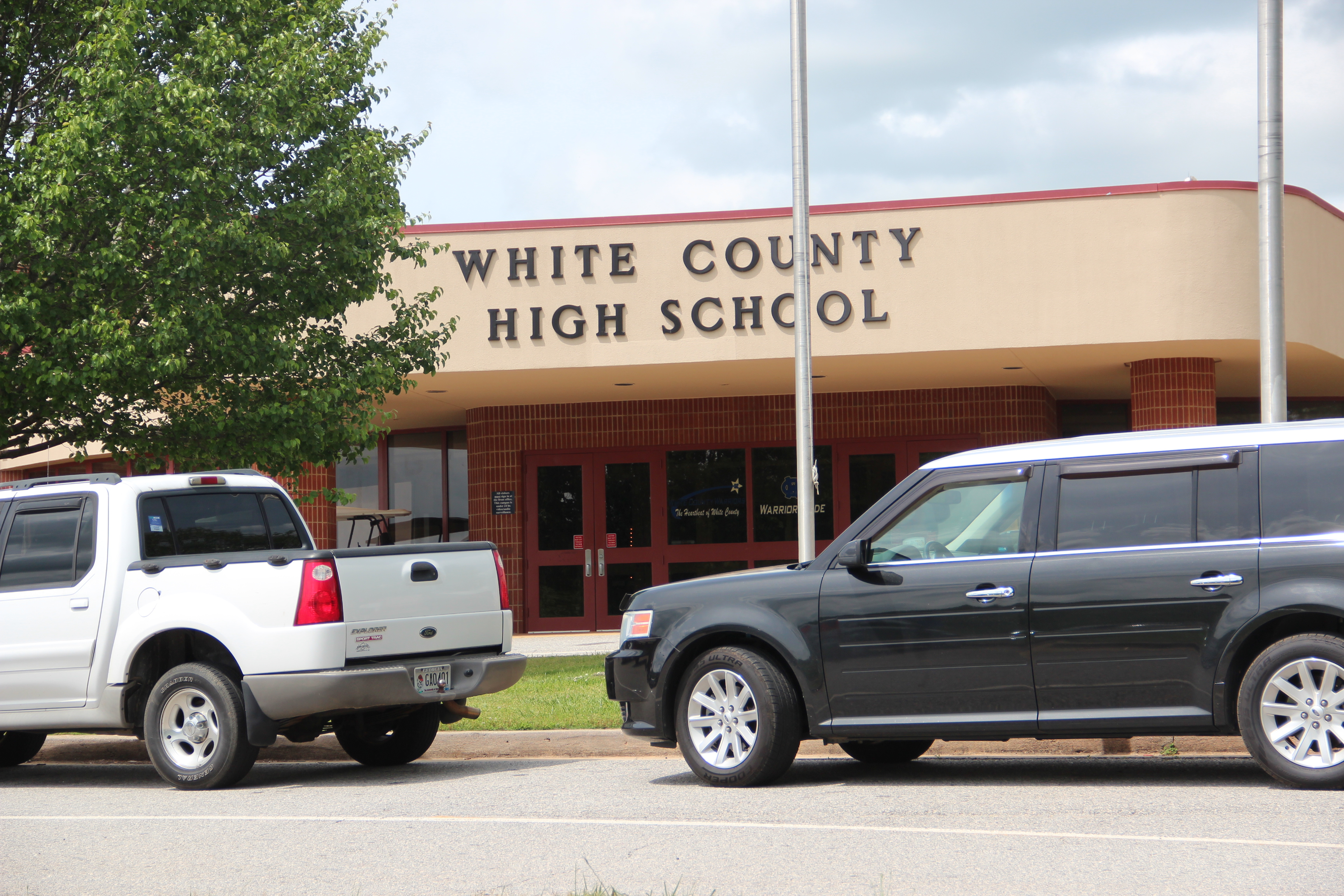
- White County High School in 2017

Location
- 2600 Highway 129 N Cleveland, Georgia 30528
- Coordinates: 34°37′02″N 83°47′40″W

Information
- Established: 1959
- School district: White County School District
- Principal: Mary Anne Collier
- Teaching staff: 75.20 (FTE)
- Grades: 9–12
- Enrollment: 1,140 (2024–2025)
- Student to teacher ratio: 15.16
- Colors: Navy, white and gray
- Athletics conference: GHSA Div. 7A-AAA
- Mascot: Warrior
- Rivals: Lumpkin County High School; North Hall High School
- Website: wchs.white.k12.ga.us

White County High School is a public high school located in Cleveland, Georgia, United States, in the foothills of the Blue Ridge Mountains, which serves the youth of Cleveland and Helen in grades 9–12. It is accredited by The Southern Association of Colleges and Schools.

== School colors ==
The school's traditional colors are navy blue and white. In the early 1990s, gold trim was added to uniforms to honor the old Nacoochee High School, which merged into White County High School in the late 1950s. In more recent years, silver has also been used for many uniforms and other spirit gear.

== History ==
The school opened its doors in 1959 but it has since moved and is located about five miles north of the original campus on Highway 129. In the 1950s, the 23 local community schools were consolidated into four districts. Most of the community schools only went to the eighth grade; afterwards, the students matriculated to either Cleveland High School or Nacoochee High School. Cleveland High School and Nacoochee High School consolidated into White County High School in 1959. Both the old Nacoochee gym and school still stand; the school is now a museum.

Students were segregated until 1964 in the White County School System. Prior to integration, black children went to one of three schools: Rock Springs, Oak Springs, or Bean Creek. After completing grade school, black students were bussed to nearby Habersham County to attend high school. Desegregation was accomplished in White County schools harmoniously and without much fanfare.

In 2010, the old White County High School building (which had served as the middle school) was demolished to build a new middle school. At this time, community members were offered the opportunity to keep a brick from the old school building, to cherish the memories and many generations of learning that took place in the building over 50+ years.

== Significant events ==
- 1872 - The Board of Education approved the first textbooks for use in local schools.
- 1912 - The Corn Club was formed. This was the forerunner of the present FFA Club and the first school club in White County.
- 1920 - Sports programs were established when basketball was introduced at Cleveland and Nacoochee High Schools.
- 1938 - Gymnasiums were completed at Cleveland and Nacoochee High Schools.
- 2022 - The field surface of Darrell Dorsey Field is replaced with artificial turf.

== Notable alumni ==
- Xavier Roberts - creator of Cabbage Patch Kids

== White County High School Athletic Hall of Fame ==
In May 2012 White County High School had its inaugural Hall of Fame recognition ceremony. The 2012 inductees were:

- Coach Bobby Parks spent 30 years at White County High School coaching basketball and football and teaching driver's education.
- Coach Bill White was a 1963 graduate of White County High School and a standout football player. After finishing college, he returned to his alma mater and coached football, baseball, 8th grade basketball, and tennis from 1968 to 1978. He also served as Athletic Director from 1978 to 1988.
- Jesse Dorsey was a running back who still holds the WCHS record for most rushing yards in a career. He played at the University of Georgia and Tennessee Tech in college.

== GHSA Literary Competition ==
In 2007, White County High School won its first GHSA Literary State Championship. After two first-place finishes at the Gainesville regional competition, the Wyszynski sisters advanced to the Annual State Literary Festival in Warner Robins. Senior Lindsey Wyszynski placed second in Dramatic Interpretation, and sophomore Whitney Wyszynski placed first in Extemporaneous Speaking. Whitney Wyszynski continued to place first in Region for her remaining two years of high school. She would later win a State Runner-Up title and a final State Championship title in Extemporaneous Speaking.
