= Lumpkin County School District =

School district in Georgia (U.S. state)

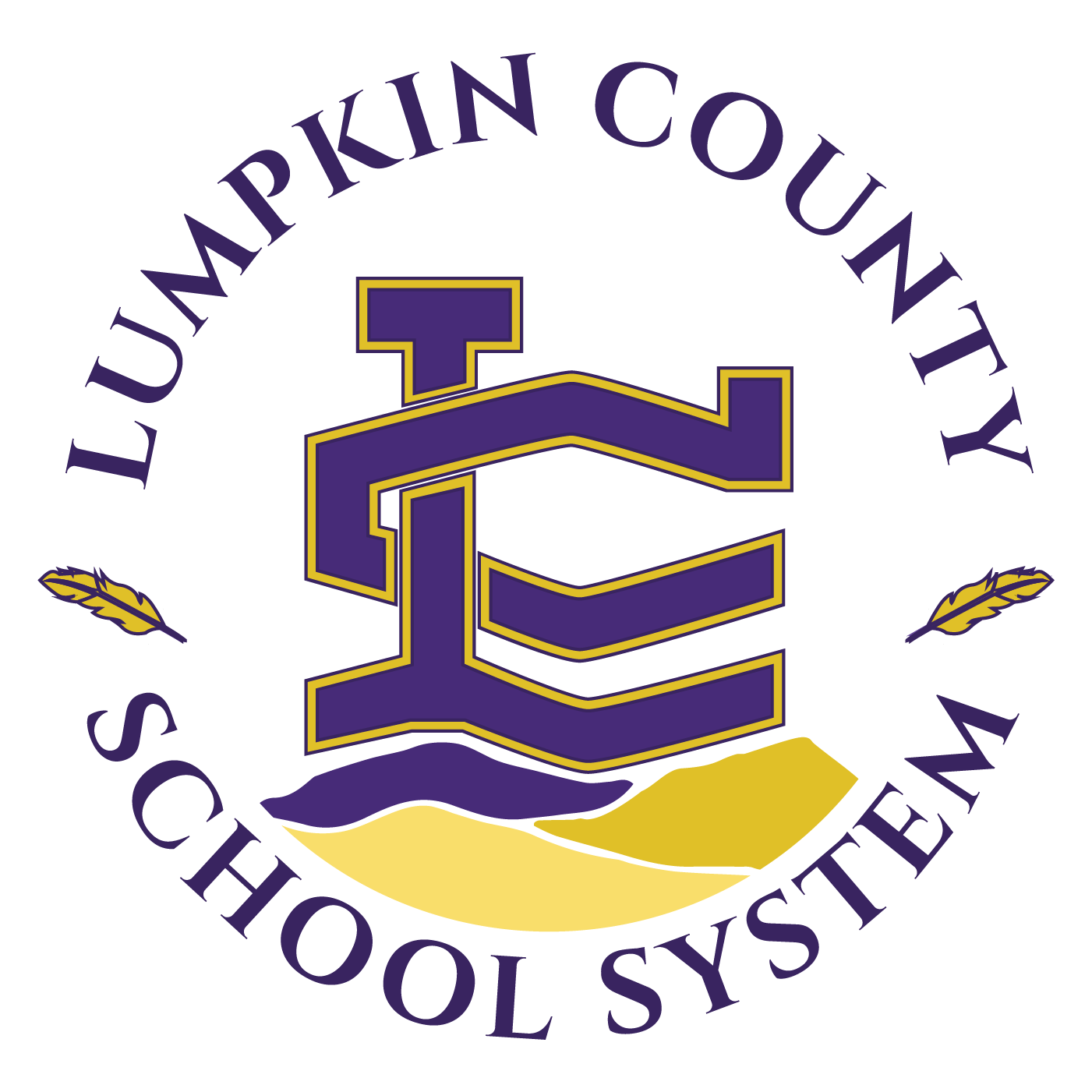

Address
- 56 Indian Drive Dahlonega, Georgia, 30533; United States
- Coordinates: 34.543081°N 83.988277°W

District information
- Type: Public school district
- Grades: Pre-Kindergarten – 12
- Superintendent: Sharon Head
- Schools: 5
- NCES District ID: 1303420

Students and staff
- Enrollment: 3,749 (2022–23)
- Teachers: 258.20 (FTE)
- Student–teacher ratio: 14.52

Other information
- Website: lumpkinschools.com

Lumpkin County School District is a public school district in Lumpkin County, Georgia, United States, based in Dahlonega. It serves the communities of Auraria and Dahlonega.

== Schools ==
The Lumpkin County School District has three elementary schools, one middle school, and one high school.

=== Elementary ===
- Blackburn Elementary School
- Long Branch Elementary School
- Cottrell Elementary School ( formerly Lumpkin County Elementary School )

=== Middle ===
- Lumpkin County Middle School

=== High ===
- Lumpkin County High School

=== Notable alumni ===
- Zac Brown, country music artist

== 2013 school prayer controversy ==
On May 3, 2013, Atlanta news outlet WSB-TV reported on "controversy brewing" about an impromptu six-hour prayer meeting held in the gymnasium at Lumpkin County High School for a student who had brought questions about his religious beliefs to his football coach. The student then texted some of his friends who were fellow believers, asking them to come and pray with him. Over 50 students came to the gym to support the student in what WSB-TV called a "sort of revival meeting on campus in the middle of the day." According to the report, three to four teachers were also present at the event, which lasted from 9:30 that morning into the afternoon. At least one teacher abandoned his or her classroom to attend the event. In a videotaped interview, Lumpkin County School District Superintendent Dewey Moye said that one of the school's assistant principals put a stop to the meeting and ordered the participants back to class. Moye went on to say that he had met with school administrators to educate them about "equal access law" (regarding organized religious activities on campus during school hours).
