= Oakwood, Georgia =

- City
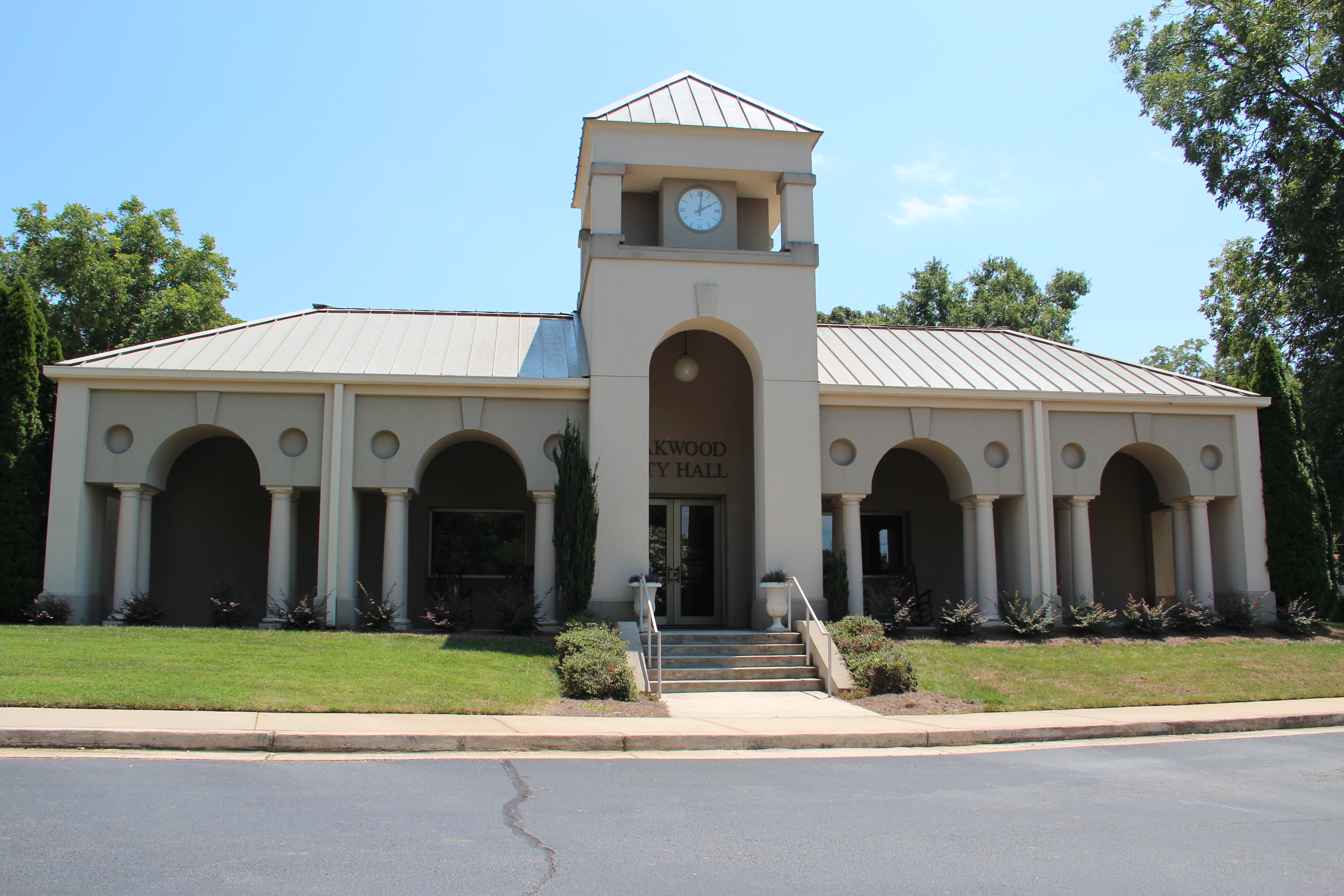
- Oakwood City Hall

- Location in Hall County and the state of Georgia
- Coordinates: 34°15′04″N 83°51′40″W
- Country: United States
- State: Georgia
- County: Hall
- O'Dell's Crossing: 1873; 153 years ago
- Oakwood: 1896; 130 years ago
- Incorporated: 1903; 123 years ago

Government
  - Type: Popular vote democracy
  - Mayor: Lamar Scroggs

Area
  - Total: 5.87 sq mi (15.21 km^{2})
  - Land: 5.86 sq mi (15.19 km^{2})
  - Water: 0.0077 sq mi (0.02 km^{2})
- Elevation: 1,191 ft (363 m)

Population (2020)
  - Total: 4,822
  - Density: 822.4/sq mi (317.54/km^{2})
- Time zone: UTC-5 (Eastern Standard Time (EST))
  - Summer (DST): UTC-4 (EDT)
- ZIP codes: 30566, 30542, 30502, 30504
- Area code: 770
- FIPS code: 13-57260
- GNIS feature ID: 2404414
- Website: www.cityofoakwood.net

Oakwood is a city in Hall County, Georgia, United States. It is part of the Gainesville, Georgia Metropolitan Statistical Area. The population was 4,822 at the 2020 census, up from 3,970 in 2010. Oakwood is home to the University of North Georgia Gainesville Campus and Wayne Farms.

== History ==
Oakwood was originally founded as O'Dell's Crossing in 1873. It was later renamed to Oakwood in 1896 as wood-burning trains regularly stopped here for fuel resupplies.

The Georgia General Assembly incorporated Oakwood in 1903.

== Geography ==
Oakwood is located southwest of the center of Hall County. It is bordered to the northeast by the city of Gainesville, the county seat, and to the southwest by the city of Flowery Branch.

Interstate 985 travels through the southeastern part of Oakwood, with access from Exits 16 and 17. Via I-985 it is 48 miles (77 km) southwest to downtown Atlanta.

According to the United States Census Bureau, the city has a total area of 5.1 square miles (13.1 km^{2}), of which 0.01 square miles (0.02 km^{2}), or 0.12%, are water.

== Demographics ==
Historical population
Census	Pop.	Note	%±
1910	110		—
1920	163		48.2%
1930	189		16.0%
1940	207		9.5%
1950	225		8.7%
1960	218		−3.1%
1970	250		14.7%
1980	723		189.2%
1990	1,464		102.5%
2000	2,689		83.7%
2010	3,970		47.6%
2020	4,822		21.5%
2025 (est.)	7,245	▲	50.2%
U.S. Decennial Census; 2025

=== 2020 census ===
As of the 2020 census, there were 4,822 people and 932 families in Oakwood. The median age was 33.8 years. 22.8% of residents were under the age of 18 and 11.9% were 65 years of age or older. For every 100 females, there were 91.9 males, and for every 100 females age 18 and over there were 87.9 males age 18 and over. 100.0% of residents lived in urban areas, while 0.0% lived in rural areas.

There were 2,102 households in Oakwood, of which 29.5% had children under the age of 18 living in them. Of all households, 31.4% were married-couple households, 24.2% were households with a male householder and no spouse or partner present, and 36.3% were households with a female householder and no spouse or partner present. About 34.8% of all households were made up of individuals and 11.9% had someone living alone who was 65 years of age or older.

There were 2,352 housing units, of which 10.6% were vacant. The homeowner vacancy rate was 6.3% and the rental vacancy rate was 8.5%.

Oakwood racial composition
Race	Num.	Perc.
White (non-Hispanic)	2,476	51.35%
Black or African American (non-Hispanic)	693	14.37%
Native American	5	0.1%
Asian	139	2.88%
Pacific Islander	4	0.08%
Other/Mixed	177	3.67%
Hispanic or Latino	1,328	27.54%

=== 2000 census ===
As of the census of 2000, there were 2,689 people, 1,031 households, and 686 families residing in the city. The population density was 859.1 inhabitants per square mile (331.7/km^{2}). There were 1,098 housing units at an average density of 350.8 per square mile (135.4/km^{2}). The racial makeup of the city was 76.76% White, 10.45% African American, 0.30% Native American, 3.12% Asian, 0.11% Pacific Islander, 7.59% from other races, and 1.67% from two or more races. Hispanic or Latino of any race were 20.68% of the population.

There were 1,031 households, out of which 38.8% had children under the age of 18 living with them, 45.4% were married couples living together, 15.0% had a female householder with no husband present, and 33.4% were non-families. 24.4% of all households were made up of individuals, and 3.4% had someone living alone who was 65 years of age or older. The average household size was 2.58 and the average family size was 3.04.

In the city, the population was spread out, with 27.0% under the age of 18, 13.8% from 18 to 24, 39.3% from 25 to 44, 14.2% from 45 to 64, and 5.8% who were 65 years of age or older. The median age was 28 years. For every 100 females, there were 104.3 males. For every 100 females age 18 and over, there were 103.9 males.

The median income for a household in the city was $37,862, and the median income for a family was $43,308. Males had a median income of $31,413 versus $21,414 for females. The per capita income for the city was $16,083. About 7.2% of families and 10.6% of the population were below the poverty line, including 8.6% of those under age 18 and 15.7% of those age 65 or over.
