= Gainesville High School (Georgia) =

Public high school in Gainesville, Georgia, United States

Location
- 830 Century Place; Gainesville, Georgia 30501–3002; United States; 34.296886°N 83.842014°W

Information
- School type: Public
- Established: 1892
- School district: Gainesville City School District
- Principal: Roberto Rivera
- Teaching staff: 148.30 (FTE)
- Grades: 9–12
- Enrollment: 2,356 (2023–2024)
- Student to teacher ratio: 15.89
- Colors: Red and white
- Slogan: Go Big Red/ Go Mighty Elephants
- Mascot: Red Elephant
- Team name: Red Elephants
- Newspaper: The Trumpeter
- Yearbook: Radiator
- Website: ghsweb.gcssk12.net

Gainesville High School is located in Gainesville, Georgia, United States.

== History ==
Gainesville High School was founded in 1892. It originally served White students only. In 1969, when court orders forced integration, the all-Black E. E. Butler High School was closed and its students rezoned to GHS.

== Curriculum ==
Like the majority of comprehensive high schools in the US, GHS offers Advanced Placement and honors courses. In addition to Advanced Placement courses, Gainesville High School offers the AP Capstone program which gives students a chance at a second diploma by taking college level classes such as AP Seminar and AP Research. It also offers vocational curricula. In 2003 the school incorporated a formal Apprenticeship and Mentor Program to tech prep classes.

== Recognition ==
- Gainesville High School was awarded the National Blue Ribbon award for 2010. This is considered the highest honor an American school can achieve.
- Gainesville High School has been recognized as a State School of Excellence.
- In 2006, students Preston Smith, Robert Whelchel, and Bryan Williams were recognized for superior talent as winners of Southeast Regional Emmy Awards.
- Under the guidance of Pam Ware, the drama department was honored as one of 50 high schools chosen to participate in the Fringe Festival in Edinburgh, Scotland in 2005, 2008, and 2011.
- GHS has a tradition of Governors Honors participants and National Merit Scholar recipients, with test scores consistently in the top 10% in the state.

== Athletics ==
GHS teams are known as the Red Elephants. They are the only school in the country with that mascot. They received the name in the 1920s when the well-known writer Grantland Rice decided to watch the final game of the undefeated 1925 Gainesville Red Elephants football team. Rice quipped, "The team is coming on the field looking like a herd of "Red Elephants as the ground shakes beneath their feet". From 1923 to 1925, the Red Elephants had a combined record of 26 wins and 0 losses (19 of those 26 wins came via shutout). They scored a combined 1045 points and allowed only 70. The GHSA did not exist at the time and State Champions were not named. The Red Elephants football team won the State Championship in 2012 with Deshaun Watson (Current Cleveland Browns QB) leading the way.

=== Boys' golf teams ===
Gainesville High School claims one of the most successful boys' golf programs in Georgia history. The program has won seven GHSA state championships (1978, 1979, 1981, 1994, 1996, 2012, and 2013).

== Notable alumni ==
- Tommy Aaron, professional golfer
- Cris Carpenter, baseball player
- Damon Evans, administrator
- Michael Gettys, baseball player
- John Driskell Hopkins, musician
- Tasha Humphrey, basketball player
- A.J. Johnson, National Football League player
- T. J. Jones, National Football League player
- Jeremiah Ledbetter, National Football League player
- Kendrick Lewis, National Football League player
- Billy Lothridge, National Football League player
- Billy Martin, National Football League player
- Lewis Massey, politician
- Micah Owings, baseball player
- D'Marcus Simonds, basketball player
- Blake Sims, football player
- Jeremiah Telander, college football player
- Tommy Valentine, golfer
- Deshaun Watson, National Football League player
- Tommy West, college football coach
- Chris Williamson, National Football League player
