= Feldwood High School =

Location
- (formerly located at) 5935 Feldwood Road; 5AA-South; College Park, Georgia 30349; United States; 33°35′33″N 84°31′6″W

Information
- Type: Public high school
- Principal: Billy Jones
- Grades: 8 - 12
- Years offered: 1976 - 1988
- Campus: Suburban
- Colors: Red, white, and blue
- Mascot: Flames
- Yearbook: Embers
- Website: https://www.facebook.com/feldwoodflames

Feldwood High School was a public high school in unincorporated Fulton County, Georgia, United States. It was a part of the Fulton County School System. The school opened in the fall of 1976 as a result of growth and split class sessions at M.D. Collins High School. In recognition of the bicentennial year, the colors selected for the school were red, white, and blue.

In 1988 the school closed and combined again with M.D. Collins High School to form Banneker High School (Georgia) on the Feldwood campus. The merger happened as a result of a consolidation plan to reduce the costs of the school system, comply with new state laws mandating minimum attendance numbers for government funded schools, and upgrade course offerings within all schools in the county.

In addition to serving some unincorporated areas, it also served sections of the city of College Park.
