= William Wagner (long snapper) =

American football player (born 2000)

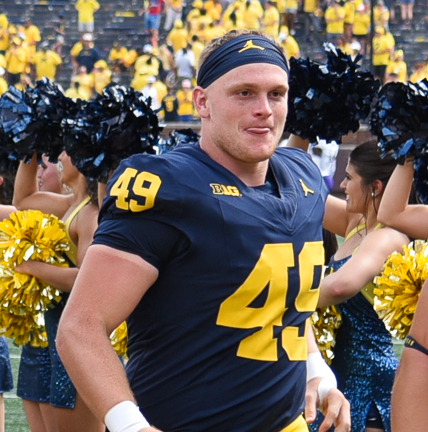
- Wagner with the Michigan Wolverines in 2023

No. 46 – Cincinnati Bengals
- Position: Long snapper
- Roster status: Active

Personal information
- Born: December 20, 2000 (age 25); Alpharetta, Georgia, U.S.
- Listed height: 6 ft 2 in (1.88 m)
- Listed weight: 240 lb (109 kg)

Career information
- High school: Alpharetta (GA)
- College: Michigan (2019–2024)
- NFL draft: 2025: undrafted

Career history
- Cincinnati Bengals (2025–present)

Awards and highlights
- CFP national champion (2023); First-team All-Big Ten (2024)

Career NFL statistics as of Week 8, 2026
- Games played: 24
- Total tackles: 3
- Stats at Pro Football Reference

William Wagner (born December 20, 2000) is an American professional football long snapper for the Cincinnati Bengals of the National Football League (NFL). He played college football for the Michigan Wolverines. Wagner was an All-Big Ten selection, winning three consecutive conference titles and a national championship in 2023.

== Early life ==
Wagner was born to Lee and Michelle Wagner. His brother, Michael, played college football at Mercer. He attended Alpharetta High School in Alpharetta, Georgia.

== College career ==
Wagner committed to play for head coach Jim Harbaugh and enrolled at the University of Michigan in 2019, using his freshman season to redshirt. As a sophomore in 2020, he started all six games in a season that was shortened due to the COVID-19 pandemic. As a junior in 2021, he started all 14 games. As a senior in 2022, he started five games before suffering a season-ending injury against Iowa on October 1, 2022.

As a fifth-year senior in 2023, he started all 15 games. He was part of a kicking battery that scored 119 points, the seventh-most in single-season program history, and helped Michigan win the national championship. As a sixth-year senior in 2024, he started all 13 games. Following the season, he was named a Patrick Mannelly Award finalist and named first-team All-Big Ten by the coaches. He was also invited to the 2025 Senior Bowl. He finished his collegiate career completing 282 snaps for kicks and 196 for punts in 53 games as the long snapper.

== Professional career ==
Pre-draft measurables
Height	Weight	Arm length	Hand span	Wingspan	40-yard dash	Bench press
6 ft 1 3/8 in (1.86 m)	239 lb (108 kg)	30 1/2 in (0.77 m)	9 1/8 in (0.23 m)	6 ft 2 3/8 in (1.89 m)	4.95 s	19 reps
All values from Pro Day

On April 26, 2025, Wagner signed with the Cincinnati Bengals as an undrafted free agent.

== Personal life ==
Wagner graduated from the University of Michigan with an undergraduate degree in mechanical engineering and a master's degree in manufacturing mechanical engineering. As an undergraduate student, he was a member of the Gordon Group and studied additive manufacturing.
