= Barnwell Elementary School =

Barnwell Elementary School can refer to several United States schools:

- Barnwell Elementary School in Johns Creek, Georgia, of Fulton County School System
- Barnwell Elementary School in Barnwell, South Carolina, of Barnwell School District
