= Michael Bennett (wide receiver) =

American football player (born 1991)

No. 80
- Position: Wide receiver

Personal information
- Born: December 19, 1991 (age 34); Alpharetta, Georgia, U.S.
- Listed height: 6 ft 2 in (1.88 m)
- Listed weight: 200 lb (91 kg)

Career information
- High school: Alpharetta (Alpharetta, Georgia)
- College: Georgia
- NFL draft: 2015: undrafted

Career history
- Cincinnati Bengals (2015)*
- * Offseason or practice squad member only
- Stats at Pro Football Reference

Michael Bennett (born December 19, 1991) is an American former professional football player. He was signed by the Cincinnati Bengals in 2015, and cut from the team in 2016.
