= Mountain Park Elementary School =

Mountain Park Elementary School can refer to:

- Mountain Park Elementary, New Jersey, a school located in Berkeley Heights, New Jersey
- Mountain Park Elementary, Georgia (U.S. State), a school located in Roswell, Georgia
