= Alpharetta, Georgia =

- City
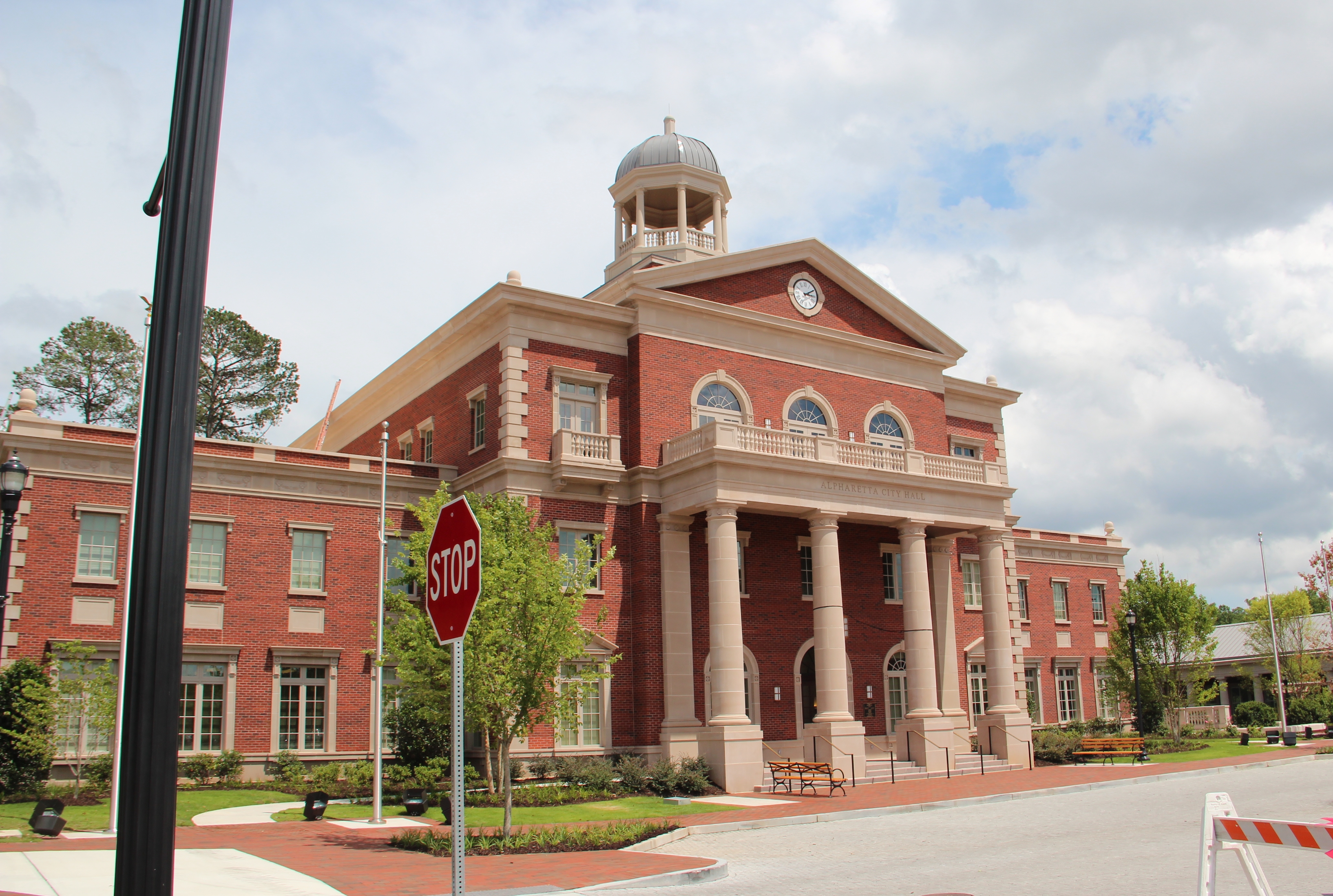
- Alpharetta City Hall

- Flag Seal Logo
- Interactive map of Alpharetta, Georgia
- Coordinates: 34°04′21″N 84°15′30″W
- Country: United States
- State: Georgia
- County: Fulton
- Incorporated: December 11, 1858

Area
  - Total: 27.27 sq mi (70.62 km^{2})
  - Land: 26.90 sq mi (69.67 km^{2})
  - Water: 0.37 sq mi (0.95 km^{2})
- Elevation: 1,066 ft (325 m)

Population (2020)
  - Total: 65,818
  - Density: 2,450/sq mi (945/km^{2})
- Time zone: UTC−5 (EST)
  - Summer (DST): UTC−4 (EDT)
- ZIP codes: 30004, 30005, 30009, 30022
- Area codes: 770, 404, 678
- FIPS code: 13-01696
- GNIS feature ID: 2403088
- Website: alpharetta.ga.us

Alpharetta is a city in northern Fulton County, Georgia, United States, and part of the Atlanta metropolitan area. As of the 2020 census, Alpharetta had a population of 65,818.

== History ==
In the 1830s, the Cherokee people in Georgia and elsewhere in the South were forcibly relocated to the Indian Territory (present-day Oklahoma) under the Indian Removal Act. Pioneers and farmers later settled on the newly vacated land, situated along a former Cherokee trail stretching from the North Georgia mountains to the Chattahoochee River.

One of the area's first permanent landmarks was the New Prospect Camp Ground (also known as the Methodist Camp Ground), beside a natural spring near what is now downtown Alpharetta. It later served as a trading post for the exchanging of goods among settlers.

Known as the town of Milton through July 1858, the city of Alpharetta was chartered on December 11, 1858, with boundaries extending in a 0.5-mile (0.8 km) radius from the city courthouse. It served as the county seat of Milton County until 1931, when Milton County merged with Fulton County to avoid bankruptcy during the Great Depression.

The city's name may be a variation of a fictional Indian girl, Alfarata, in the 19th-century song "The Blue Juniata"; it may also be derived from alpha, the first letter of the Greek alphabet. but according to information shown in the Alpharetta Milton museum the meaning of retta is unknown.

The Simeon and Jane Rucker Log House, built in 1833, was listed on the National Register of Historic Places in 1997.

The inhabitants of the area, primarily Methodists and Baptists, engaged in various occupations such as farming, blacksmithing, milling, merchandising, carpentry, and ditching. A number of them possessed a small number of slaves. Throughout the American Civil War (1861–1865), local men participated in combat or served in the home guard; however, Union forces did not advance north of Roswell, which is situated roughly six miles to the southwest.

== Geography ==
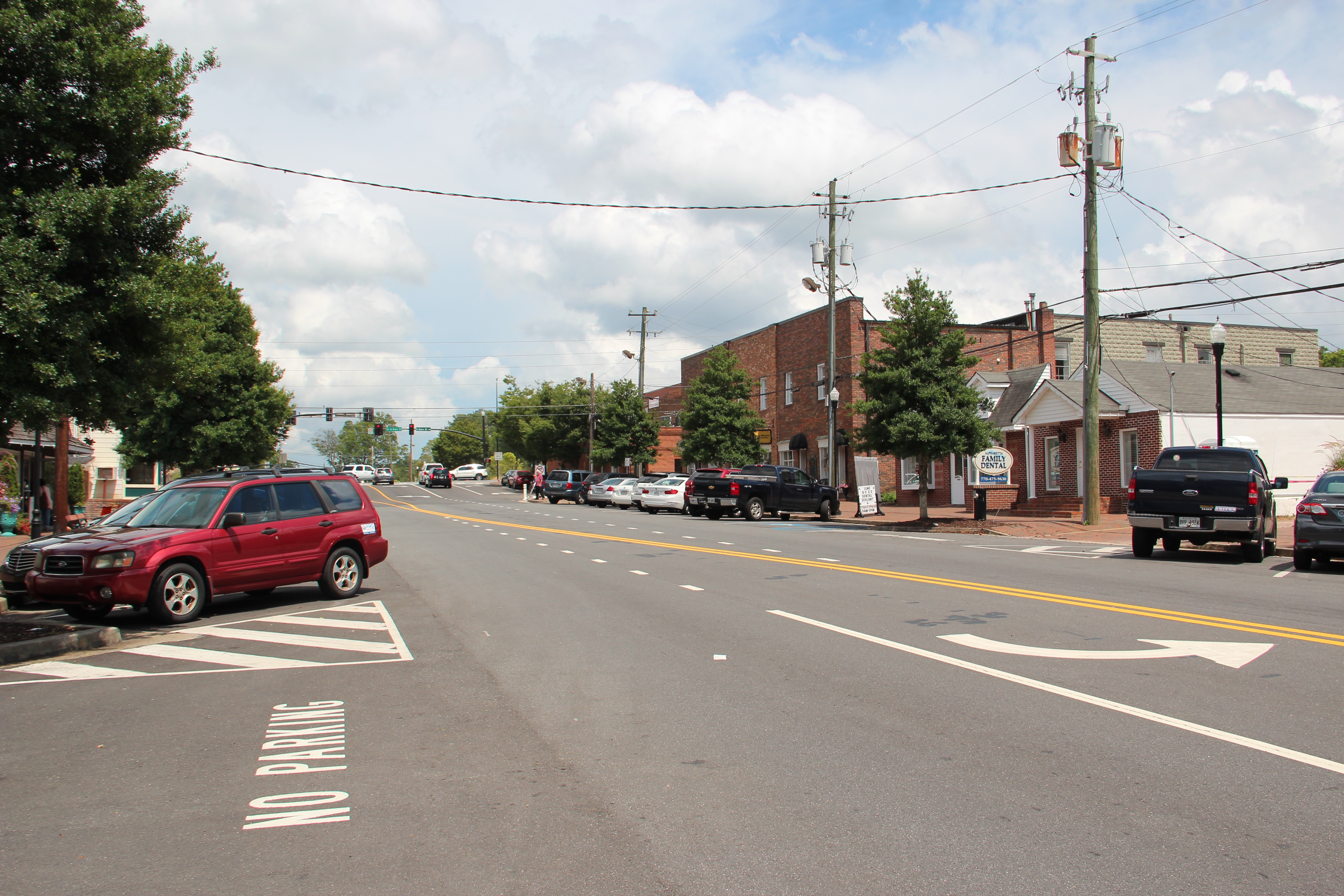
Downtown Alpharetta

Alpharetta is in northern Fulton County and is bordered to the southeast by Johns Creek, to the south and west by Roswell, to the north by Milton, and to the northeast by unincorporated land in Forsyth County. Downtown Alpharetta is 26 miles (42 km) north of downtown Atlanta.

According to the United States Census Bureau, Alpharetta has an area of 27.3 square miles (70.7 km^{2}), of which 26.9 square miles (69.7 km^{2}) is land and 0.39 square miles (1.0 km^{2}), or 1.37%, is water.

=== Climate ===
Alpharetta has a humid subtropical climate (Köppen climate classification: Cfa) and is part of USDA hardiness zone 7b.

Climate data for Alpharetta, GA
Month	Jan	Feb	Mar	Apr	May	Jun	Jul	Aug	Sep	Oct	Nov	Dec	Year
Mean daily maximum °F (°C)	50.4 (10.2)	54.7 (12.6)	63.4 (17.4)	71.5 (21.9)	77.9 (25.5)	85.0 (29.4)	87.1 (30.6)	86.6 (30.3)	80.9 (27.2)	71.6 (22.0)	62.0 (16.7)	52.9 (11.6)	70.3 (21.3)
Mean daily minimum °F (°C)	29.6 (−1.3)	32.1 (0.1)	38.6 (3.7)	45.5 (7.5)	54.6 (12.6)	63.6 (17.6)	67.0 (19.4)	66.8 (19.3)	59.5 (15.3)	48.1 (8.9)	38.1 (3.4)	32.0 (0.0)	48.0 (8.9)
Average precipitation inches (mm)	3.96 (101)	5.08 (129)	4.54 (115)	3.63 (92)	4.28 (109)	3.91 (99)	4.84 (123)	4.54 (115)	4.38 (111)	3.52 (89)	4.15 (105)	4.58 (116)	51.41 (1,304)
Average snowfall inches (cm)	0.6 (1.5)	0.2 (0.51)	0.1 (0.25)	0 (0)	0 (0)	0 (0)	0 (0)	0 (0)	0 (0)	0 (0)	0 (0)	0 (0)	0.9 (2.26)
Average precipitation days (≥ 0.01 in)	9.8	9.5	9.0	8.0	9.0	8.5	10.2	8.7	6.4	6.4	7.8	9.6	102.9
Average snowy days (≥ 0.1 in)	0.4	0.4	0.1	0	0	0	0	0	0	0	0	0.1	1.0
Source: NOAA

== Demographics ==
Historical population
Census	Pop.	Note	%±
1860	261		—
1870	126		−51.7%
1880	164		30.2%
1890	256		56.1%
1900	310		21.1%
1910	356		14.8%
1920	379		6.5%
1930	477		25.9%
1940	647		35.6%
1950	917		41.7%
1960	1,349		47.1%
1970	2,455		82.0%
1980	3,128		27.4%
1990	13,002		315.7%
2000	34,854		168.1%
2010	57,551		65.1%
2020	65,818		14.4%
2025 (est.)	66,961	▲	1.7%
U.S. Decennial Census; 1850–1870 1870–1880; 1890–1910 1920–1930; 1940 1950 1960; 1970 1980 1990; 2000 2010; 2025

=== Racial and ethnic composition ===
Alpharetta city, Georgia – Racial and ethnic composition Note: the US Census treats Hispanic/Latino as an ethnic category. This table excludes Latinos from the racial categories and assigns them to a separate category. Hispanics/Latinos may be of any race.
Race / Ethnicity (NH = Non-Hispanic)	Pop 2000	Pop 2010	Pop 2020	% 2000	% 2010	% 2020
White alone (NH)	28,143	37,391	36,473	80.75%	64.97%	55.41%
Black or African American alone (NH)	2,224	6,099	6,667	6.38%	10.60%	10.13%
Native American or Alaska Native alone (NH)	58	70	101	0.17%	0.12%	0.15%
Asian alone (NH)	1,986	7,678	13,181	5.70%	13.34%	20.03%
Native Hawaiian or Pacific Islander alone (NH)	6	28	22	0.02%	0.05%	0.03%
Other race alone (NH)	129	214	538	0.37%	0.37%	0.82%
Mixed race or Multiracial (NH)	381	1,179	2,716	1.09%	2.05%	4.13%
Hispanic or Latino (any race)	1,927	4,892	6,120	5.53%	8.50%	9.30%
Total	34,854	57,551	65,818	100.00%	100.00%	100.00%

=== 2020 census ===
As of the 2020 census, Alpharetta had a population of 65,818, 24,727 households, and 18,167 families. The median age was 39.7 years. 23.8% of residents were under the age of 18 and 11.8% of residents were 65 years of age or older. For every 100 females there were 94.0 males, and for every 100 females age 18 and over there were 91.9 males age 18 and over.

100.0% of residents lived in urban areas, while 0.0% lived in rural areas.

Among households, 36.5% had children under the age of 18 living in them. Of all households, 58.1% were married-couple households, 14.9% were households with a male householder and no spouse or partner present, and 23.2% were households with a female householder and no spouse or partner present. About 24.2% of households were made up of individuals and 7.7% had someone living alone who was 65 years of age or older.

There were 26,089 housing units, of which 5.2% were vacant. The homeowner vacancy rate was 1.2% and the rental vacancy rate was 8.1%.

Racial composition as of the 2020 census
Race	Number	Percentage
White	37,639	57.2%
Black or African American	6,785	10.3%
American Indian and Alaska Native	185	0.3%
Asian	13,205	20.1%
Native Hawaiian and Other Pacific Islander	23	0.0%
Some other race	2,357	3.6%
Two or more races	5,624	8.5%
Hispanic or Latino (of any race)	6,120	9.3%

== Economy ==
=== Top employers ===
According to the city's Economic Development Department, the city's top private sector employers as of February 2026 were:

Rank	Employer	No. of Employees
6	Fiserv, Inc.	2,087
1	ADP, Inc.	2,074
8	MCI Inc. (Verizon)	1,928
4	Equifax	1,722
5	Jackson Healthcare	1,235
2	Morgan Stanley	1,225
9	UPS Supply Chain Solutions	811
3	Surgical Information Systems	634
7	Toyota Motor Credit Corporation	560
10	Ernst & Young	550

=== Retail and mixed-use complexes ===
Complexes in the area include:

- North Point Mall, a traditional mall set for redevelopment.
- An 86-acre (35 ha) mixed-use development, Avalon, opened in 2014.
- Alpharetta City Center, a mixed-use destination in Downtown Alpharetta that includes 74,000 square feet of retail and restaurants, 36,000 square feet of office, 168 luxury apartments, greenspaces, Alpharetta City Hall, and a branch of Fulton County Library.
- The Halcyon mixed residential-retail-entertainment-dining complex opened in 2019 in nearby Forsyth County has an Alpharetta postal address, but is not within the city limits or in the same county.
- The Maxwell, a 37,000-square-foot retail space in Downtown Alpharetta with a variety of entertainment, restaurants, and health and wellness companies. Downtown Alpharetta also consists of over 600 businesses including The Hamilton Alpharetta hotel, specialty boutiques, restaurants, fitness studios, and coffee shops.

=== Data centers ===
Alpharetta invested in optical fiber since the 1980s and hosts multiple data centers. In 2019, the fintech industry in the Atlanta area was a driver of data center expansion in Alpharetta.

While supported by tax breaks from Fulton County authorities, data center expansion run into limitations from state regulations and local zoning authorities in 2024, as capacity in Atlanta tripled from 200 MW to over 700 MW in 2023.

=== Tech North Atlanta ===
Tech North Atlanta (formerly known as Tech Alpharetta and the Alpharetta Technology Commission or simply ATC) is an advisory organization established by the City of Alpharetta in 2012. The organization is an independent, 501(c)(6) nonprofit organization that aims to help Alpharetta lead in technology innovation. Tech North Atlanta runs an advisory board of technology companies based in the city, holds monthly technology events for technology executives, and operates the Tech Alpharetta Innovation Center, a technology startup incubator. As of early 2020 about ten companies have "graduated" from Tech Alpharetta's incubator and were hiring employees in the North Fulton County region.

=== Major companies ===
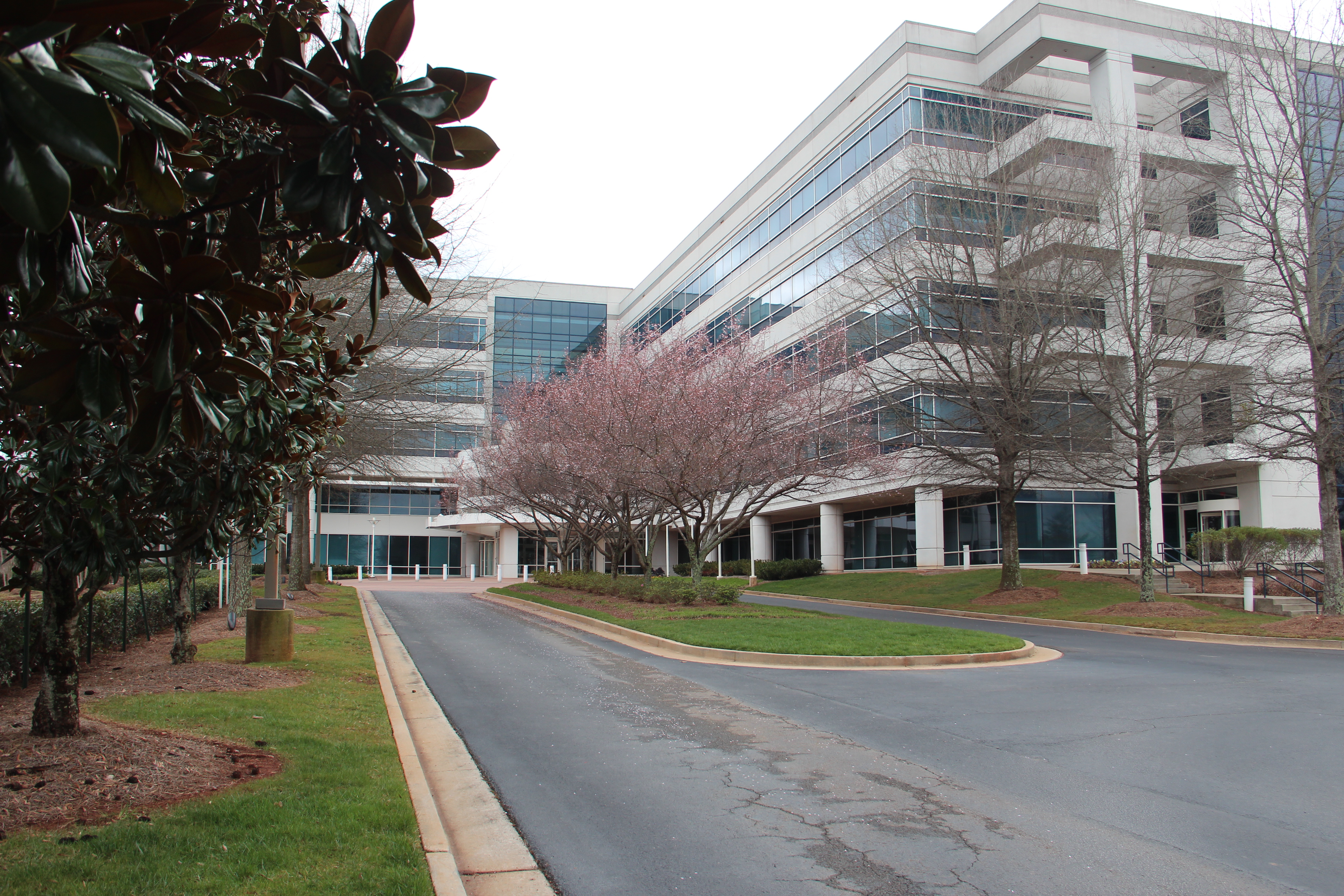
McKesson Corporation offices

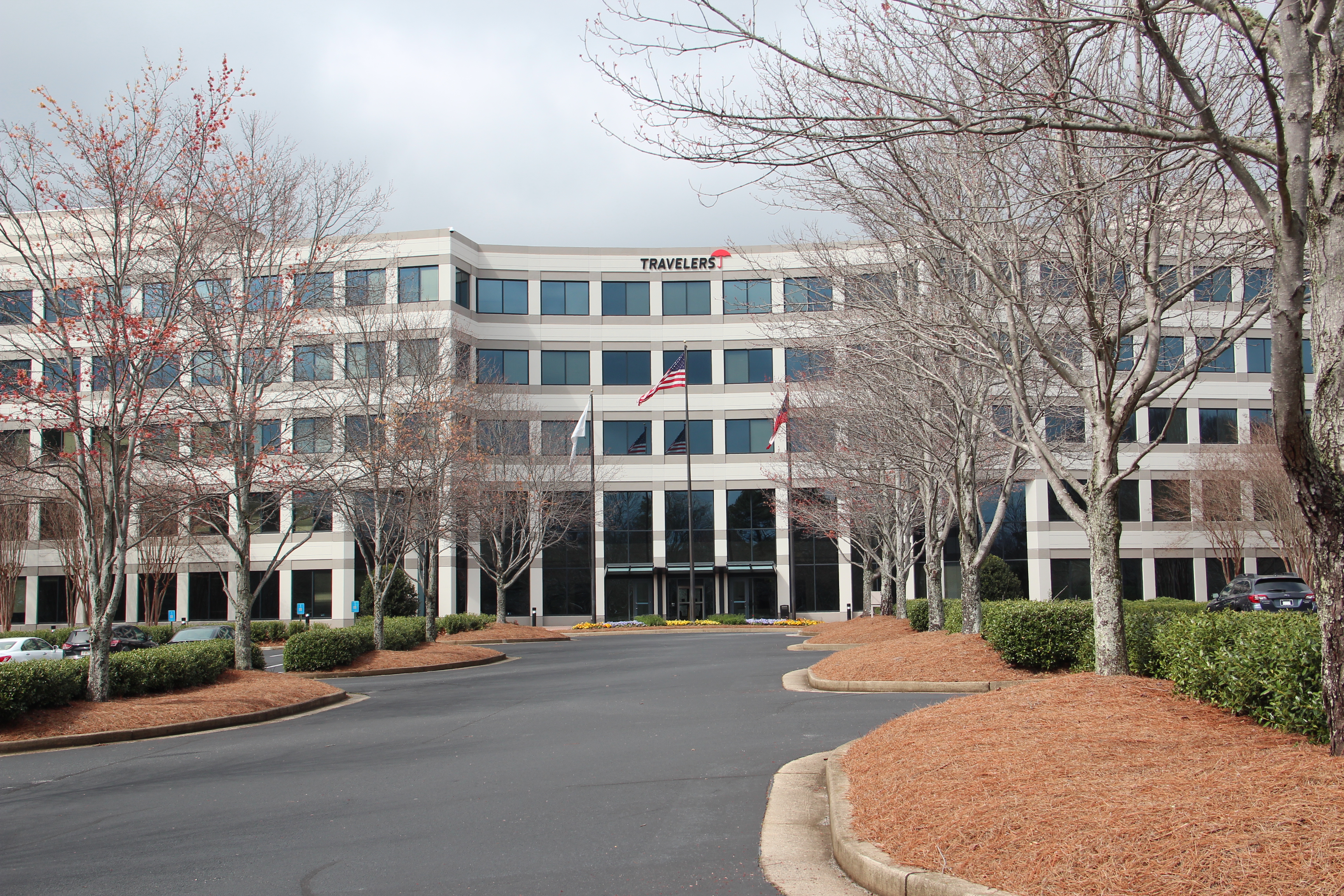
Travelers Insurance offices

Cynergy Data is headquartered in Alpharetta, as was NetBank when it existed.

== Attractions and events ==
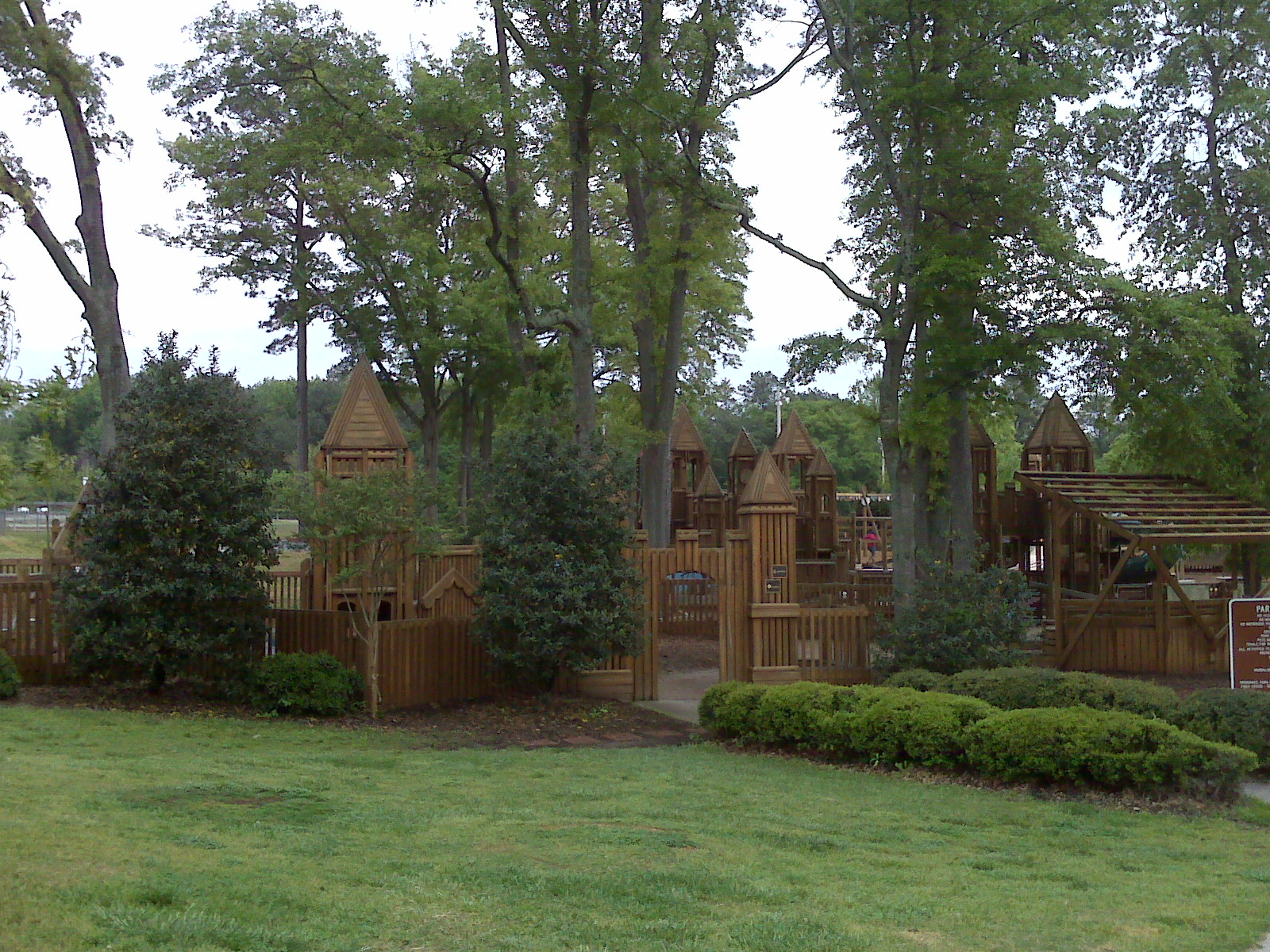
Wills Park wacky world playground

The Alpharetta Arboretum at Wills Park was established in September 2008 and includes 26 trees. A brochure about the arboretum guides readers through a walking tour of the trees and is available at the Downtown Alpharetta Welcome Center.

The Alpharetta Arboretum at Cogburn Road Park was established in December 2008 and showcases seven trees.

The Alpharetta Farmers Market is a weekly farmers' market in the downtown area from April to October. The market was named "Best Saturday Morning Excursion" in 2007 by Atlanta magazine. csc

The Mansell House and Gardens is a 1912 Queen Anne style home that serves as a special event facility in Alpharetta. It is home to the Alpharetta Historical Society.

The Alpharetta Brew Moon Fest is held the first Saturday in October in downtown Alpharetta.

Ameris Bank Amphitheatre is a 12,000-capacity outdoor venue that serves as the summer home of the Grammy Award-winning Atlanta Symphony Orchestra and hosts acts like the Dave Matthews Band, Rod Stewart, Phish, Steve Miller Band and the Eagles.

The Alpharetta Big Creek Greenway is a 12-mile-long (19 km), 12-foot-wide (3.7 m) concrete path that meanders through the woods along Big Creek, offering a place to walk, jog, inline skate and bike. The path includes additional mountain bike trails.

The Alpha Loop is a multi-use paved trail that connects neighborhoods, offices, dining, and entertainment. First begun in 2020, the Alpha Loop is now over 6 miles long and has new connections currently under construction.

The Taste of Alpharetta is an annual food festival featuring food from local restaurants, live music, and art exhibits during May.

The Wire and Wood Alpharetta Songwriters Festival in downtown Alpharetta is held in October.

The Exiles Rugby Football Club is a community rugby union club based in Alpharetta. Founded in 2020, the club operates senior men's and women's rugby programs as well as the Exiles Rugby Academy for youth players. The Exiles men's side won the Georgia Rugby Union Redmond Cup championship in 2023, defeating the Gainesville Spartans Rugby Football Club in the state final.

The Exiles men's XVs are coached by Marcus Hall. The club's senior programs provide rugby opportunities for both men and women, while the Exiles Rugby Academy provides youth rugby for boys and girls, including Minis and high school-age rugby. The club also provides non-contact touch rugby opportunities and welcomes both new and experienced players.

The Exiles Rugby Football Club's primary training grounds are located at Innovation Academy in Alpharetta. The club serves players and families from Alpharetta, Milton and the surrounding North Metro Atlanta area.

Official website

North Park, Wills Park, and Webb Bridge Park feature 15 lighted tennis courts along with 8 asphalt pickleball courts at North Park. Tennis lessons, clinics, camps, and leagues are available.

== Education ==
=== Primary and secondary schools ===
The city is served by Fulton County Schools.

==== Elementary schools ====
- Abbotts Hill Elementary School
- Alpharetta Elementary School
- Birmingham Falls Elementary School in Milton
- Cogburn Woods Elementary School in Milton
- Crabapple Crossing Elementary School in Milton
- Creek View Elementary School
- Dolvin Elementary School
- F.A.S.T. k-8
- Hembree Springs Elementary School in Roswell
- Lake Windward Elementary School
- Manning Oaks Elementary School
- Mimosa Elementary School in Roswell
- New Prospect Elementary School
- Ocee Elementary School in Johns Creek
- Summit Hill Elementary School in Milton
- Fulton Science Academy Private School in Roswell

==== Middle schools ====
- Autrey Mill Middle School in Johns Creek
- Elkins Pointe Middle School in Roswell
- Haynes Bridge Middle School
- Holcomb Bridge Middle School
- Hopewell Middle School in Milton
- Northwestern Middle School in Milton
- Taylor Road Middle School in Johns Creek
- Webb Bridge Middle School
- Amana Academy, a public charter school in Alpharetta for students in Kindergarten to 8th grade
- Fulton Science Academy (FSA), a private school in Roswell for students in 6th to 8th grade
- International Charter School of Atlanta (Upper Campus)

==== High schools ====
- Alpharetta High School serves most of Alpharetta
- Cambridge High School in Milton
- Centennial High School in Roswell
- Chattahoochee High School in Johns Creek
- Johns Creek High School in Johns Creek
- Milton High School in Milton
- Northview High School
- Roswell High School in Roswell
- Independence High School, an alternative school on the old Milton High School campus.
- FCS Innovation Academy, a public charter school in Alpharetta.
- Fulton Science Academy Private School, a private school in Roswell.

=== Private schools ===
- The Lionheart School
- St. Francis Schools
- Mount Pisgah Christian School
- Fulton Science Academy Private School

The Roman Catholic Archdiocese of Atlanta operates Holy Redeemer Catholic School (K-8). Although it is in Johns Creek, the school's location is often stated to be in Alpharetta.

=== Higher education ===
Perimeter College at Georgia State University, Gwinnett Technical College and Reinhardt University have campuses in Alpharetta.

=== Musical education ===
- Alpharetta Symphony Youth orchestra (ASYO)

=== Public libraries ===
Atlanta-Fulton Public Library System operates the Alpharetta Branch.

== Government ==
Alpharetta is governed by a city council composed of six members and a mayor. The mayor and council members serve staggered four-year terms:

City council
Post	Council member	Term	Notes
Post 1	T. Kirk Driskell	2026–2029	
Post 2	Katie Reeves	2026–2029	
Post 3	Douglas DeRito	2026–2029	
Post 4	John Hipes	2024–2027	
Post 5	Fergal Brady	2024–2027	
Post 6	Dan Merkel	2024–2027	Mayor pro tem (2024)

=== Mayor ===
- Jim Gilvin, 2018–present

== Transportation ==
=== Major highways ===
- State Route 9
- State Route 120
- State Route 140
- State Route 372
- State Route 400
- U.S. Route 19

=== Pedestrians and cycling ===
- There are plans for the creation of the Alpha Loop. The multi-use path will serve to connect residents of Alpharetta to activity centers, parks, and jobs by a network of multi-use trails providing safe alternatives to driving and offering recreational benefit.
- The Big Creek Greenway is a concrete multi-use trail that runs from Windward Parkway to Mansell Road. The concrete trail is approximately 8 miles (13 km) long and meanders along Big Creek parallel to North Point Parkway, from Windward Parkway at Marconi Drive on the north end to Mansell Road on the south end. A soft mulch trail encircles a large wetland between Haynes Bridge Road and Mansell Road. Wildlife such as blue heron, deer, ducks and Canada geese can be observed in this preserved water setting. Future plans are to connect the trail to Cumming.

=== Mass transit ===
Alpharetta is not directly served by MARTA trains, but is connected by multiple bus routes. Connecting Alpharetta to the rest of Metro Atlanta via heavy rail has been studied.

== Notable people ==
- Auzoyah Alufohai (born 1996), NFL football nose tackle
- Julie Aigner-Clark, teacher, known for founding Baby Einstein in 1996
- Peyton Barber (born 1994), NFL football running back
- Brandon Beach (born 1961), politician serving as a member of the Georgia State Senate and the 46th Treasurer of the United States
- Malik Beasley, basketball player
- Jaron Blossomgame, basketball player
- Clint Boling (born 1989), NFL football guard
- Trey Britton (born 1989), basketball center
- Bobbi Kristina Brown (1993–2015), reality television star, musician
- Devontae Cacok (born 1996), Israeli Basketball Premier League, and formerly NBA, basketball center
- Lee Chapple (born 1989), football quarterback
- Dominik Chong-Qui (born 2007), Major League Soccer left back
- CJ Cochran (born 1991), soccer goalkeeper
- Joshua Dobbs (born 1995)), NFL football quarterback
- Anthony Fisher (born 1986), American-Israeli basketball shooting guard
- Ken Flach (1963–2018), tennis player, doubles world #1
- Kaiser Gates, basketball player
- Marjorie Taylor Greene (born 1974), politician and businesswoman
- Cullen Harper (born 1986), football quarterback
- Jaycee Horn (born 1999), NFL football cornerback
- Courtney Jaye (born 1978), singer and songwriter
- Carl Lawson (born 1995), NFL football defensive end
- Brandon Leibrandt (born 1992), Major League Baseball pitcher
- Madison Lintz, actress
- Baylee Littrell, singer
- Brian Littrell, singer and member of Backstreet Boys
- Jack McInerney, soccer forward
- Dorothy Norwood, gospel singer and songwriter
- James Ramsey, college baseball coach
- Ryann Redmond, actress and singer known for Bring It On: The Musical
- Alex Ross, football quarterback
- Ryan Roushandel, soccer player and coach
- Tyler Ruthven, soccer defender
- Ariana Savalas, performer
- Marcus Sayles, football defensive back
- Shannon Scott, basketball player
- Heath Slocum, professional PGA golfer
- Tanner Smith, basketball player and coach
- Andy Stanley, founder and senior pastor of North Point Ministries
- Maria Taylor (born 1987), sportscaster for NBC Sports
- Ty Toney, basketball player
- Justin Tuggle (born 1990), NFL football linebacker
- Charlie Whitehurst (born 1982), NFL football quarterback
- Lisa Wu, actress and former cast member of The Real Housewives of Atlanta
