= Eric Berry =

American football player (born 1988)

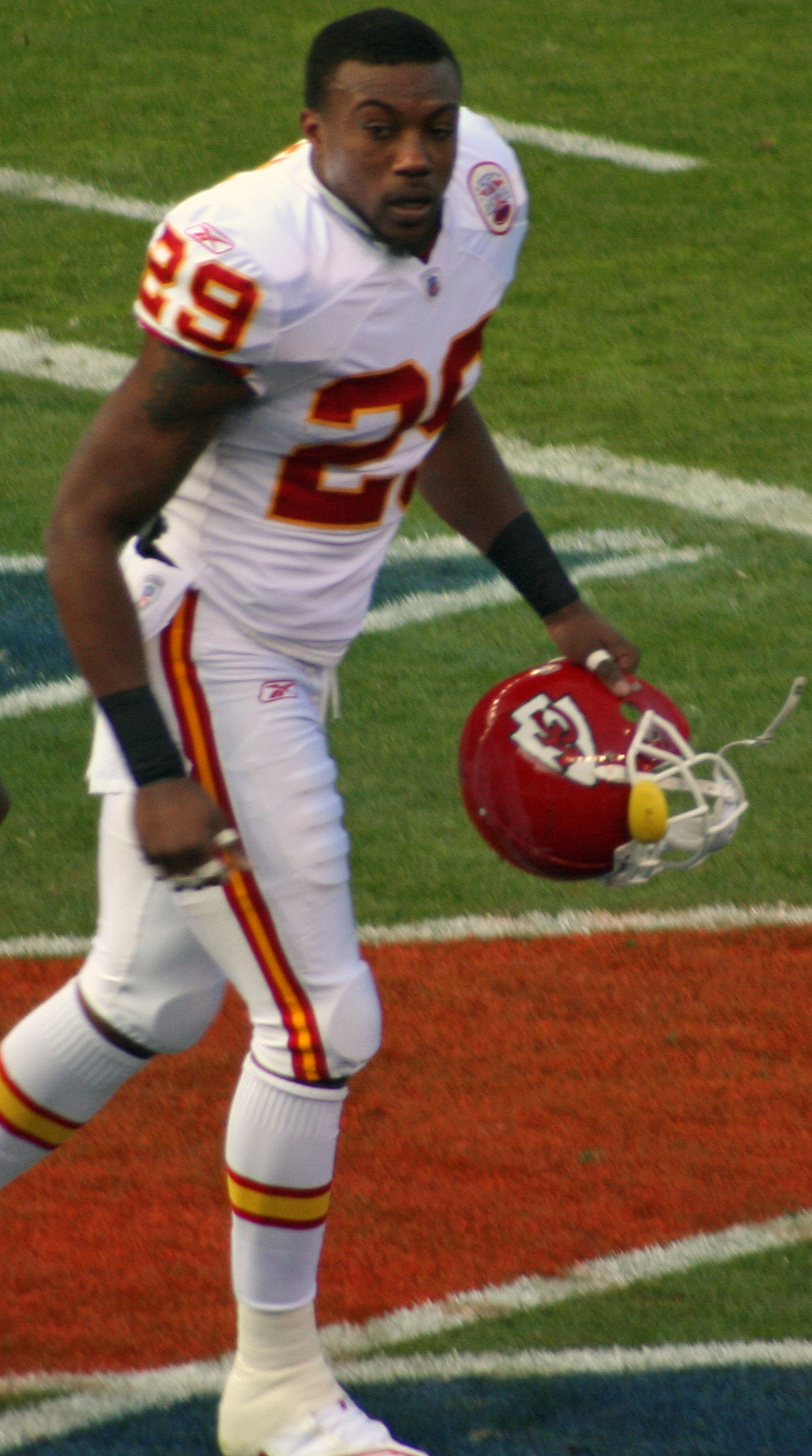
- Berry with the Kansas City Chiefs in 2010

No. 29
- Position: Safety

Personal information
- Born: December 29, 1988 (age 37); Fairburn, Georgia, U.S.
- Listed height: 6 ft 0 in (1.83 m)
- Listed weight: 212 lb (96 kg)

Career information
- High school: Creekside (Fairburn)
- College: Tennessee (2007–2009)
- NFL draft: 2010: 1st round, 5th overall pick

Career history
- Kansas City Chiefs (2010–2018)

Awards and highlights
- NFL Comeback Player of the Year (2015); 3× First-team All-Pro (2013, 2015, 2016); 5× Pro Bowl (2010, 2012, 2013, 2015, 2016); NFL 2010s All-Decade Team; PFWA All-Rookie Team (2010); George Halas Award (2016); Jim Thorpe Award (2009); 2× Jack Tatum Trophy (2008, 2009); 2× Unanimous All-American (2008, 2009); NCAA interceptions co-leader (2008); SEC Defensive Player of the Year (2008); 2× First-team All-SEC (2008, 2009); Second-team All-SEC (2007)

Career NFL statistics
- Total tackles: 440
- Sacks: 5.5
- Interceptions: 14
- Forced fumbles: 3
- Pass deflections: 50
- Defensive touchdowns: 5
- Stats at Pro Football Reference
- College Football Hall of Fame

James Eric Berry (born December 29, 1988) is an American former professional football player who was a safety for the Kansas City Chiefs of the National Football League (NFL). He played college football for the Tennessee Volunteers, earning unanimous All-American honors twice and recognition as the best collegiate defensive back in the country. Berry was selected by the Chiefs fifth overall in the 2010 NFL draft. He was voted to the Pro Bowl five times and named first-team All-Pro three times.

Berry was diagnosed with Hodgkin's lymphoma in December 2014. After going through chemotherapy in the offseason and being declared cancer free, Berry came back for the 2015 season and was named to the Pro Bowl, the AP All-Pro team, and was named the 2015 AP Comeback Player of the Year. After signing a six-year, $78 million contract, Berry ruptured his Achilles and missed most of the 2017 and 2018 seasons, leading to his release from the Chiefs. Berry was named to the NFL 2010s All-Decade Team. He was later inducted in the College Football Hall of Fame in 2023, and the Tennessee Athletics Hall of Fame in 2025.

== Early life ==
Berry was born in Fairburn, Georgia. He attended Creekside High School in Fairburn, and was a standout athlete for the Seminole track and football teams.

Berry played cornerback and quarterback, earning a 37–5 record as a starter at Creekside. He was teammates with Rokevious Watkins and Terrance Parks. Following his stellar high school career, Berry was invited to play in the 2007 U.S. Army All-American Bowl. Berry was considered the top player in Georgia and the top cornerback prospect by every recruiting service, and Rivals.com ranked him the #3 player in the nation. He was once clocked at 4.36–4.41 range at the 40-yard dash at a soft indoor surface at a high school Combine.

Berry was also a standout athlete for Creekside's track team. He set school records in long jump, with a leap of 6.95 meters, and 200 meters, with a time of 21.76 seconds.

Berry was the anchor leg of the 2006 Class 4A state championship 4 × 400 meters relay team. Individually, he was the 2005 Class 4A state champion in the 200 meters and 2007 Class 4A state champion in the Long Jump, beating future NFL players Brandon Boykin, 2nd and Stephen Hill, 3rd.

He had career-bests of 10.48 seconds in the 100 meters and 21.42 seconds in the 200 meters. He was regarded as the most scouted safety since Sean Taylor.

== College career ==
Berry received many scholarship offers, but chose to attend the University of Tennessee, where he played from 2007 to 2009 under head coaches Phillip Fulmer and Lane Kiffin.

=== 2007 season ===
As a freshman, Berry replaced fifth-year senior Jarod Parrish after a strong showing in his first collegiate game against California. Berry turned in several big plays during his freshman season en route to being named the SEC Defensive Freshman of the Year by the Sporting News. His 222 return yards (on five interceptions) broke the 37-year-old Tennessee record by 43 yards. Berry led all SEC freshmen in tackles with 86. He twice was named SEC Freshman of the Week for his play over the regular season's final three games. After the season, he was also named 1st team Freshman All-American by Rivals.

=== 2008 season ===
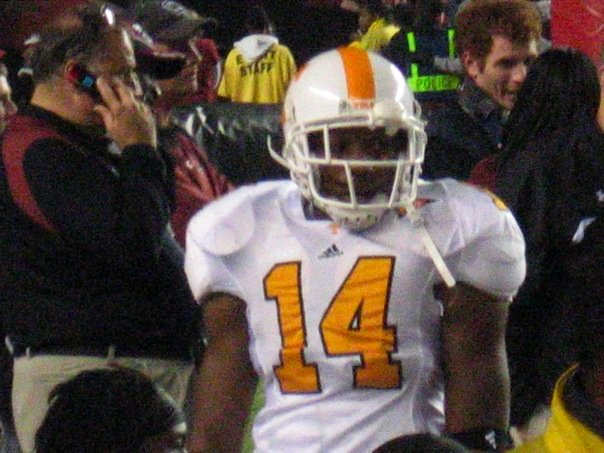
Berry in 2008 as a member of the Tennessee Volunteers.

Prior to the season, despite being a sophomore, Berry was named a team captain.

For the year, Berry tied for the national lead in interceptions with seven and returned them for 265 yards and two touchdowns, breaking the record he set the year earlier. Combined with the yards he accumulated as a freshman, Berry set the all-time career SEC record for interception return yards with 487 yards, only 14 yards shy of the NCAA record for interception return yards, set by Terrell Buckley during his time at Florida State. He also finished the regular season with 72 tackles, six pass break-ups, and three sacks.

Berry also took snaps on offense at quarterback and wide receiver, gaining 44 rushing yards on seven carries. In addition, he gained 32 yards on two kick-off returns.

His early success had some journalists speculating that he could end up being the best defensive player in Tennessee history. He was nominated as a finalist for the Jim Thorpe Award, the Lott Trophy, and the Chuck Bednarik Award.

Berry was named the SEC Defensive Player of the year and was a first-team All-SEC pick. He was also a unanimous first-team All American. The Touchdown Club of Columbus also named him their winner of the 2008 Jack Tatum Award as well.

=== 2009 season ===
As a junior, Berry recorded 87 total tackles, two interceptions, nine passes defensed, and one fumble recovery. Following the season, Berry was a first-team All-SEC selection, and was recognized as a unanimous first-team All-American for the second consecutive season. He won the Jim Thorpe Award and also was the recipient of The Touchdown Club of Columbus's Jack Tatum Award for the second straight year.

At the conclusion of the 2009 season, Berry announced his intention to enter the 2010 NFL draft.

== Professional career ==
=== Pre-draft ===
Following Tennessee's 37–14 loss to Virginia Tech in the 2009 Chick-fil-A Bowl, Berry announced his decision to forgo his final year of college football eligibility, entering the 2010 NFL draft. He attended the NFL Scouting Combine in Indianapolis, Indiana, and performed all of the combine and positional drills. Berry finished second among safeties in the 40-yard dash and fifth in the bench press. On March 16, 2010, Berry opted to participate in Tennessee's pro day but chose to stand on his combine numbers and only performed positional drills.

External videos
- Top Combine Performer: Eric Berry
- Eric Berry's NFL Combine workout
- Eric Berry's 2010 Draft Vignette

"As a rule, safeties aren't talked about going that high. But this guy, I think in everybody's mind, impacts the game. You try to get impact players, and Berry's certainly one."

— St. Louis Rams GM Billy Devaney.

Berry was regarded as the highest scouted safety since Sean Taylor, whom Berry idolized before Taylor's death, and was expected to be selected no lower than No. 7, the Cleveland Browns pick. NFL draft experts and scouts projected him to be a first-round pick and a possible top ten selection. He was ranked as the top safety prospect in the draft by NFL analyst Mike Mayock, DraftScout.com, Bleacher Report, and Sports Illustrated.

Pre-draft measurables
Height	Weight	Arm length	Hand span	40-yard dash	10-yard split	20-yard split	20-yard shuttle	Three-cone drill	Vertical jump	Broad jump	Bench press
5 ft 11 5/8 in (1.82 m)	211 lb (96 kg)	33 1/4 in (0.84 m)	9 5/8 in (0.24 m)	4.47 s	1.58 s	2.64 s	4.23 s	6.80 s	43 in (1.09 m)	10 ft 10 in (3.30 m)	19 reps
All values from NFL Combine

=== 2010 ===
The Kansas City Chiefs selected Berry in the first round (fifth overall) of the 2010 NFL draft. He became the highest-drafted defensive back since Sean Taylor in 2004, and the highest-drafted Tennessee Volunteer since Jamal Lewis. Berry selected number 29 as his jersey number in honor of former Tennessee defensive back standout Inky Johnson, whose career was cut short due to an injury, and also as a tribute to his hometown of Fairburn, Georgia, and the main road U.S. Route 29.

External videos
- Chiefs select Eric Berry fifth overall

On July 30, 2010, the Kansas City Chiefs signed Berry to a six-year, $60 million contract that included $34 million guaranteed and made him the highest-paid safety in league history.

He entered training camp slated as the starting free safety. Head coach Todd Haley named him the starter, alongside starting strong safety Jon McGraw, to start the 2010 regular season.

He made his professional regular-season debut and his first career start in the Kansas City Chiefs' season-opener against the San Diego Chargers and recorded his first career tackle on tight end Antonio Gates after he caught an 11-yard pass in the first quarter of their 21–14 victory. He finished his debut with six combined tackles. On October 24, 2010, Berry recorded four solo tackles, two pass deflections, forced a fumble and made his first career interception off a pass by quarterback Todd Bouman during a 42–20 victory against the Jacksonville Jaguars. The following week, he made a season-high ten combined tackles (seven solo), deflected a pass, and intercepted a pass by Ryan Fitzpatrick in their 13–10 overtime victory over the Buffalo Bills. In Week 9, he recorded four combined tackles and a season-high two sacks on quarterback Jason Campbell in the Chiefs' 23–20 overtime victory at the Oakland Raiders. It marked Berry's first career sack. On December 26, 2010, Berry made four solo tackles, broke up a pass, and returned an interception for a 54-yard touchdown to mark the first score of his career. His interception was off a pass by quarterback Kerry Collins that was originally intended for Nate Washington and occurred in the second quarter of their 34–14 victory against the Tennessee Titans in Week 16. He finished his rookie season with a career-high 92 combined tackles (77 solo), nine pass deflections, four interceptions, two sacks, a touchdown, and a forced fumble in 16 games and 16 starts. He led the team in interceptions (4), and was second only to Derrick Johnson in tackles and solo tackles.

On January 24, 2011, it was reported that Berry would play in the 2011 Pro Bowl as a replacement for Troy Polamalu, who was appearing in the AFC Championship with the Pittsburgh Steelers. He became the first Chiefs rookie to be selected to the Pro Bowl since linebacker Derrick Thomas. Berry helped to improve the Kansas City defense from 29th best unit in the 2009 season in terms of points allowed to 11th in the 2010 season, In addition to starting every game, Berry was on the field for almost half of Kansas City's special teams plays and was the only Chiefs defender to play every defensive snap.

The Kansas City Chiefs finished first in the AFC West with a 10–6 record. On January 9, 2011, Berry recorded ten combined tackles and a season-high four pass deflections during a 30–7 loss to the Baltimore Ravens in the AFC Wild Card Round. He was named to the NFL All-Rookie Team. He was ranked 93rd by his fellow players on the NFL Top 100 Players of 2011.

=== 2011 ===
Berry started the Kansas City Chiefs' season-opener against the Buffalo Bills, but sustained a torn ACL on the Bills' second offensive drive during the first quarter of their 41–7 loss. He sustained the injury during a seven-yard run by C. J. Spiller and went down untouched while attempting to switch direction in pursuit of him. On September 14, the Kansas City Chiefs officially placed him on injured reserve prematurely ending his second season before he recorded a stat. On September 29, 2011, he underwent surgery to repair the torn ligament. Throughout the season, Jon McGraw replaced Berry in the lineup. On December 13, 2011, the Kansas City Chiefs fired head coach Todd Haley after they stood at a 5–8 record. Defensive coordinator Romeo Crennel was named interim head coach for the last three games.

=== 2012 ===
Berry returned to training camp in 2012 and reclaimed his role as the starting strong safety. Head coach Romeo Crennel named Berry and Lewis the starting safety duo to begin the regular season.

On November 1, 2012, Berry recorded eight combined tackles, a pass deflection, and intercepted a pass by Philip Rivers during a 31–13 loss at the San Diego Chargers. In Week 11, he collected a season-high 11 solo tackles in the Chiefs' 28–6 loss to the Cincinnati Bengals. On December 16, 2012, Berry tied his season-high of 11 solo tackles and broke up a pass in their 15–0 loss at the Oakland Raiders. On December 26, 2012, Berry was announced as one of six Chiefs players to be voted to the 2013 Pro Bowl. On December 31, 2012, the Kansas City Chiefs fired head coach Romeo Crennel after they finished with a 2–14 record. He finished the 2012 season with 86 combined tackles (73 solo), ten pass deflections, and an interception in 16 games and 16 starts.

=== 2013 ===
New head coach Andy Reid retained Berry and Lewis as the starting safeties to begin 2013.

On September 19, 2013, Berry recorded five solo tackles, two pass deflections, and returned an interception off Michael Vick for a 37-yard touchdown in the Chiefs' 26–16 victory at the Philadelphia Eagles. In Week 12, he made a season-high eight solo tackles, broke up a pass, and a sack during a 41–38 loss to the San Diego Chargers. On December 15, 2013, Berry collected three combined tackles, two pass deflections, a season-high two interceptions, and a touchdown during a 56–31 victory at the Oakland Raiders. During the first quarter, he intercepted a pass by Matt McGloin and returned it for a 37-yard touchdown. Head coach Andy Reid decided to rest Berry for the Chiefs' Week 17 matchup at the San Diego Chargers after the Chiefs had already clinched a playoff berth with an 11–4 record. On December 27, 2013, it was announced that Berry was one of eight players from the Chiefs to be voted to the 2014 Pro Bowl, marking his third consecutive Pro Bowl. Berry attained the second highest overall grade among safeties from Pro Football Focus in 2013.

He finished the season with 74 combined tackles (66 solo), ten pass deflections, a career-high 3.5 sacks, three interceptions, two fumble recoveries, and two touchdowns in 15 games and 15 starts. On January 4, 2014, Berry started in the AFC Wild Card Round and recorded nine combined tackles and a forced fumble during their 45–44 loss at the Indianapolis Colts. He was ranked 50th by his fellow players on the NFL Top 100 Players of 2014.

=== 2014 ===
Berry remained the starting strong safety during training camp and was officially named the starter by defensive coordinator Bob Sutton for the season-opener, along with free safety Husain Abdullah. He started the Kansas City Chiefs' season-opener against the Tennessee Titans and recorded a career-high 15 combined tackles (14 solo) and a pass deflection during their 26–10 loss. On September 14, 2014, Berry sustained a high ankle sprain against the Denver Broncos and was sidelined for five consecutive games (Weeks 3–8). On November 20, 2014, Berry recorded five combined tackles and began complaining of chest pains after their 24–20 loss at the Oakland Raiders. On December 8, 2014, it was reported that a mass was discovered in Berry's chest and he was diagnosed with Hodgkin's lymphoma. Berry was placed on the Chiefs' non-football illness list, ending his 2014 season. Berry's doctor, Dr. Christopher Flowers, a lymphoma specialist at Emory University Hospital in Atlanta, said of Berry's diagnosis, "This is a diagnosis that is very treatable and potentially curable with standard chemotherapy approaches. The goal of Mr. Berry's treatment is to cure his lymphoma and we are beginning that treatment now." He finished the 2014 season with 37 combined tackles (32 solo) and two pass deflections in six games and five starts.

=== 2015 ===
On July 28, 2015, the Kansas City Chiefs announced that Berry had been cleared to resume football activities and was declared clear of cancer nearly nine months after his initial diagnosis. Head coach Andy Reid opted to bring Berry back gradually and named him the backup free safety behind Husain Abdullah to begin the 2015 regular season.

On September 17, 2015, he made his first start of the season and recorded four solo tackles in his return to Arrowhead Stadium as the Chiefs lost to the Denver Broncos 31–24. In Week 7, Berry recorded six combined tackles, a pass deflection, and intercepted a pass by Ben Roethlisberger in a 23–13 win against the Pittsburgh Steelers. On November 15, 2015, Berry made two solo tackles, a career-high four pass deflections, and intercepted a pass by quarterback Peyton Manning during a 29–13 victory at the Denver Broncos. The following week, he made a season-high eight solo tackles in the Chiefs' 33–3 victory at the San Diego Chargers. On December 24, 2015, the Kansas City Chiefs announced that Berry was one of five Chiefs players to be voted to the 2016 Pro Bowl. He finished the 2015 season with 61 combined tackles (55 solo), ten pass deflections, and two interceptions in 16 games and 15 starts. Pro Football Focus gave Berry an overall grade of 87.7, which ranked fifth among all qualifying safeties in 2015. He also received the fourth highest coverage grade among safeties (85.2).

The Kansas City Chiefs finished second in the AFC West with an 11–5 record. On January 9, 2016, Berry started in the AFC Wild Card Round and recorded three combined tackles, a pass deflection, and an interception as the Chiefs routed the Houston Texans 30–0. The following game, he made seven combined tackles in Kansas City's 27–20 loss at the New England Patriots in the AFC Divisional Round. He was named Comeback Player of the Year and was ranked 55th by his fellow players on the NFL Top 100 Players of 2016.

=== 2016 ===
On March 1, 2016, the Kansas City Chiefs offered Berry a franchise tag. He decided to hold out of training camp and offseason activities in the hopes of receiving a long-term contract offer by the Chiefs. On August 28, 2016, Berry signed a one-year, $10.80 million franchise tag to remain with the Chiefs for the 2016 season after both parties were unable to come to an agreement on a long-term contract.

On November 13, 2016, Berry recorded nine combined tackles, two pass deflections, and returned an interception by Cam Newton for a 42-yard touchdown in the Chiefs' 20–17 victory at the Carolina Panthers. In Week 13, Berry made two solo tackles, broke up a pass, returned an interception for a 37-yard touchdown, and became the first player to return an interception for a defensive two-point conversion. His two-point score occurred on an interception by quarterback Matt Ryan during the two-point conversion attempt and provided the winning score for the Chiefs' 29–28 victory against the Atlanta Falcons. He earned AFC Defensive Player of the Week honors for his performance against the Falcons. On December 18, 2016, he collected a season-high 11 combined tackles (ten solo) during a 19–17 loss to the Tennessee Titans. On December 20, 2016, it was announced that Berry was one of four Chiefs players voted to the 2017 Pro Bowl, marking his fifth Pro Bowl selection of his career. He finished the season with 77 combined tackles (62 solo), nine pass deflections, four interceptions, a forced fumble, and two touchdowns in 16 games and 16 starts. Berry received an overall grade of 87.8 from Pro Football Focus, which ranked seventh among all safeties in 2016. He also received the fourth highest coverage grade among his position group (88.7) and fifth highest run defense grade (85.0).

On January 6, 2017, he was selected to be First-team All-Pro, marking his third All-Pro selection in his career. He was ranked 13th by his peers on the NFL Top 100 Players of 2017 as the highest ranked defensive back.

=== 2017 ===
On February 28, 2017, the Kansas City Chiefs signed Berry to a six-year, $78 million contract that included $40 million guaranteed and a $20 million signing bonus, making him the highest-paid safety in the NFL. However, Berry would only play four more games for the Chiefs.

He remained the starting strong safety, opposite Ron Parker, to start the regular season. He started the Kansas City Chiefs season-opener at the New England Patriots and recorded seven combined tackles, before leaving their 42–27 victory on Thursday Night Football in the fourth quarter after sustaining an apparent Achilles injury. The following day, the Chiefs announced he had ruptured his Achilles and that he would miss the rest of the season. He finished his season with seven combined tackles (four solo) in one game and one start. On September 9, 2017, the Kansas City Chiefs officially placed him on injured reserve and he underwent surgery three days later. With only one appearance, he earned an overall grade of 73.6 from Pro Football Focus.

=== 2018 ===
While recovering from the torn Achilles, he had been dealing with a sore heel, which was later diagnosed as a Haglund's deformity, which is a bone spur that digs into the Achilles causing extreme pain. He missed the first 13 games before making his season debut in Week 15. He played in two regular season games and one playoff game, the Chiefs 31–37 loss to the New England Patriots in the AFC Championship. Throughout the game, Berry was successfully targeted by Tom Brady from start to finish, as Rob Gronkowski and Julian Edelman were able to catch the ball against him with little difficulty.

On March 13, 2019, Berry was released by the Chiefs, in order to avoid a portion of his salary being fully guaranteed even though Berry expressed interest in playing the 2020 season.

In December 2021 Berry stated in an interview that he had not considered himself to be retired and was open to playing in the NFL again. However no team has signed him to play in the NFL since the 2019 season.

== Career statistics ==
=== NFL ===
Year	Team	Games		Tackles				Fumbles			Interceptions					
Year	Team	GP	GS	Comb	Solo	Ast	Sacks	FF	FR	Yds	Int	Yds	Avg	Lng	TD	PD
2010	KC	**16**	**16**	**92**	**77**	**15**	2.0	**1**	0	0	**4**	102	25.5	**54T**	1	9
2011	KC	1	1	0	0	0	0.0	0	0	0	0	0	0.0	0	0	0
2012	KC	**16**	**16**	86	73	13	0.0	0	0	0	1	1	0.0	0	0	**10**
2013	KC	15	15	74	66	8	**3.5**	**1**	**2**	**24**	3	**134**	**44.7**	49	**2**	**10**
2014	KC	6	5	37	32	5	0.0	0	0	0	0	0	0.0	0	0	2
2015	KC	**16**	15	61	55	6	0.0	0	0	0	2	40	20.0	25	0	**10**
2016	KC	**16**	**16**	77	62	**15**	0.0	**1**	0	0	**4**	98	24.5	42T	**2**	9
2017	KC	1	1	7	4	3	0.0	0	0	0	0	0	0	0	0	0
2018	KC	2	2	11	8	3	0.0	0	0	0	0	0	0	0	0	0
Career		86	84	427	365	62	5.5	3	2	24	14	375	26.7	54T	5	50

=== College ===
Correct as of the end of the 2009 season.

Legend
	Led the NCAA
**Bold**	Career high

Year	GP–GS	Tackles		Sacks	Pass defense				Fumbles	
Year	GP–GS	Tackles	Loss–Yards	No–Yards	Int–Yards	TD	PD	QBH	Yards	FF
2007	14–14	**86**	2–3	0–0	5–222	1	4	0	**55**	**2**
2008	12–12	72	**9–21**	**3–11**	**7–265**	**2**	6	0	0	0
2009	12–12	83	7–15	0–0	2–7	0	**7**	**3**	46	1
Total		241	18–39	3–11	14–494	3	17	3	0–0	0

== Career highlights ==
NFL

- NFL Comeback Player of the Year (2015)
- 3× First-team All-Pro (2013, 2015, 2016)
- 5× Pro Bowl (2010, 2012, 2013, 2015, 2016)
- NFL 2010s All-Decade Team
- PFWA All-Rookie Team (2010)
- Ranked No. 93 in the Top 100 Players of 2011
- Ranked No. 50 in the Top 100 Players of 2014
- Ranked No. 13 in the Top 100 Players of 2017

College

- George Halas Award (2016)
- Jim Thorpe Award (2009)
- 2× Jack Tatum Trophy (2008, 2009)
- 2× Unanimous All-American (2008, 2009)
- NCAA interceptions co-leader (2008)
- SEC Defensive Player of the Year (2008)
- 2× First-team All-SEC (2008, 2009)
- Second-team All-SEC (2007)
- National Defensive Sophomore of the Year (Collegefootballnews.com) (2008)
- Vince Dooley Award (2008)
- National Defensive Freshman of the Year (Collegefootballnews.com) (2007)
- Unanimous first-team freshman All-American (2007)
- All-SEC Freshmen Team (2007)
- All-SEC Freshmen Academic Honor Roll (2007)
- 2000s Sports Illustrated All-Decade Team
- Bronko Nagurski Award finalist (2009)
- Lott Trophy finalist (2009)

High school

- Georgia High School Player of the Year (Gatorade) (2006)
- 2000s ESPN All-Decade High School Football Team
- 2000s first-team RivalsHigh.com Team Of The Decade

== Personal life ==
Berry's father, James, played running back for the University of Tennessee from 1978 to 1981, and was a captain of the 1981 squad. Berry's younger brothers, twins Elliott and Evan, played football at Tennessee. Berry is the first cousin once removed of former All-Pro Tampa Bay Buccaneers linebacker Hugh Green. Berry's uncle, Bernard Williams, played offensive tackle for the Georgia Bulldogs and Philadelphia Eagles, and is his mentor and business partner.

On May 4, 2010, it was reported that Berry had signed an endorsement deal with Adidas. He established the Eric Berry Foundation in 2011 that strives to provide safe environments for children to participate in team sports. His first project was a turf football field he funded in Fairburn, Georgia. He also hosts annual youth football camps in Atlanta, Tennessee, and Kansas City with proceeds going to the Eric Berry Foundation.

Berry suffers from equinophobia, a fear of horses. His condition was frequently brought on by the Kansas City Chiefs' mascot, Warpaint.
