= Lionheart School =

The Lionheart School

Location
- 225 Roswell St, Alpharetta, GA 30009; Alpharetta, Georgia; United States
- 34.07052°N 84.30273°W

Information
- Type: Independent school, special education
- Motto: "Where we see your children with our hearts, and address their needs with our minds."
- Established: September 5, 2000
- Principal: Elizabeth Dulin and Tamara Spafford and Victoria McBride
- Grades: K–12 (ages 5–21)
- Enrollment: 30
- Color: Red
- Website: The Lionheart School

The Lionheart School is a 501(c)(3) non-profit independent school for children ages 5 to 21 with autism or other disorders of relating and communicating. The school was established in 2000 and is located in Alpharetta, Georgia, United States. Lionheart was awarded SACS/SAIS (Southern Association of Colleges and Schools/ Southern Association of Independent Schools) Accreditation in 2008. Lionheart is a member of GISA (Georgia Independent Schools Association). Currently serving 30 students, Lionheart is starting a capital campaign in order to expand and take on more pupils. The school was featured in an article in the Atlanta Journal-Constitution on August 17, 2008.
