= Independence High School (Georgia) =

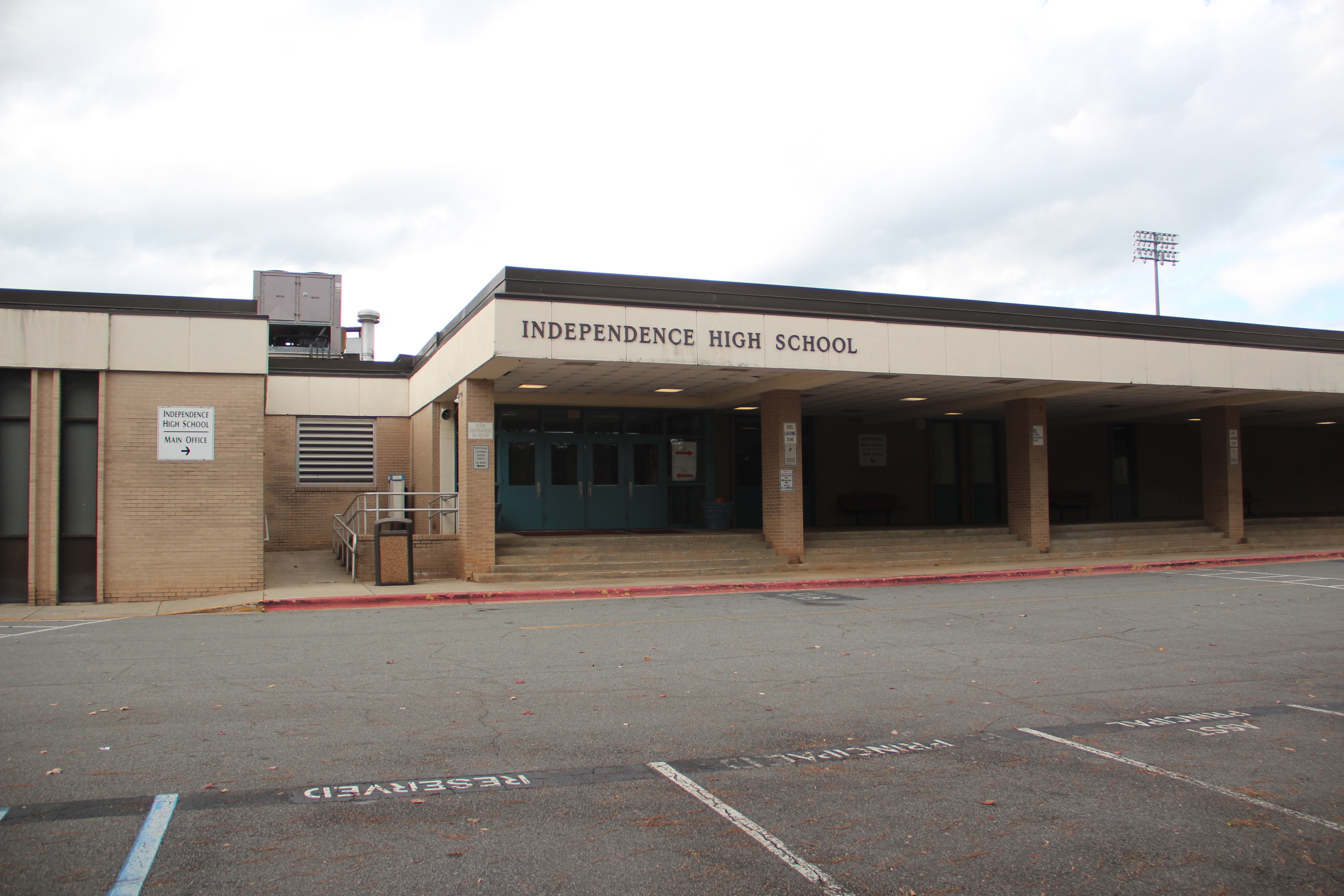

Location
- 86 School Drive; Alpharetta, Georgia; United States; 34.07812°N 84.30111°W

Information
- Type: Alternative
- Established: 1991
- School district: Fulton County School System
- CEEB code: 110061
- NCES School ID: 130228001958
- Principal: Tabatha Taylor
- Teaching staff: 16.80 (FTE)
- Enrollment: 175 (2017–18)
- Student to teacher ratio: 10.42
- Website: School website

Independence High School was an alternative high school in the historic district of Roswell, Georgia, United States. It was located on the old Milton High School campus.
