= Rokevious Watkins =

American football player (born 1989)

No. 73, 69
- Position: Offensive guard

Personal information
- Born: February 24, 1989 (age 37); Fairburn, Georgia, U.S.
- Listed height: 6 ft 3 in (1.91 m)
- Listed weight: 338 lb (153 kg)

Career information
- High school: Creekside (Fairburn)
- College: South Carolina
- NFL draft: 2012: 5th round, 150th overall pick

Career history
- St. Louis Rams (2012); Kansas City Chiefs (2013); Hudson Valley Fort (2015); Arizona Rattlers (2016)*
- * Offseason or practice squad member only

Awards and highlights
- First-team All-SEC (2011)

Career NFL statistics
- Games played: 4
- Games started: 1
- Stats at Pro Football Reference

Rokevious Paul Watkins (born February 24, 1989) is an American former professional football player who was an offensive lineman in the National Football League (NFL). He played college football for the South Carolina Gamecocks and was selected by the St. Louis Rams in the fifth round of the 2012 NFL draft. Watkins also played for the Kansas City Chiefs.

== Early life ==
Watkins attended Creekside High School in Fairburn, Georgia, where he was teammates with Eric Berry and Terrance Parks.

== College career ==
As a senior at the University of South Carolina, Watkins was named All-SEC First-team by the AP after starting all 12 games in the 2011 season. He was also named SEC Offensive Lineman of the Week after the Gamecocks' season-opener against East Carolina. In 2010, he started all 14 games, playing both guard positions. The previous season, 2009, he redshirted following a transfer from Georgia Military College.

In 2007 and 2008, Watkins played junior college ball at Georgia Military College in Milledgeville.

== Professional career ==
Pre-draft measurables
| Height | Weight | 40-yard dash | 20-yard shuttle | Three-cone drill | Vertical jump | Broad jump |
|---|---|---|---|---|---|---|
| 6 ft 4 in (1.93 m) | 338 lb (153 kg) | 5.29 s | 4.90 s | 7.87 s | 27 in (0.69 m) | 8 ft 6 in (2.59 m) |
All values from NFL Combine.

=== St. Louis Rams ===
Watkins was selected in the fifth round with the 150th overall pick by the St. Louis Rams. As a rookie, Watkins reported to camp overweight and out of shape and was held out of practice for the first several days of practice. He played in one game in 2012, the season opener in Detroit, before being put on the injured reserve. Watkins was released July 24, 2013, after reporting to training camp overweight for the second consecutive season.

=== Kansas City Chiefs ===
On August 3, 2013, Watkins was signed by the Kansas City Chiefs. Watkins was released on July 28, 2014.

=== Arizona Rattlers ===
On November 9, 2015, Watkins was assigned to the Arizona Rattlers of the Arena Football League (AFL). On March 9, 2016, Watkins was placed on reassignment.
