= Greg Blue =

American gridiron football player (born 1982)

No. 20, 24 – Dalton High School
- Title: Defensive coordinator

Personal information
- Born: March 12, 1982 (age 44); Atlanta, Georgia, U.S.
- Listed height: 6 ft 2 in (1.88 m)
- Listed weight: 216 lb (98 kg)

Career information
- High school: Banneker (College Park, Georgia)
- College: Georgia
- NFL draft: 2006: 5th round, 149th overall pick

Career history

Playing
- Minnesota Vikings (2006); Detroit Lions (2007); Toronto Argonauts (2010–2011)*
- * Offseason or practice squad member only

Coaching
- Eagan HS (MN) (2010) Defensive backs coach; Waldorf (2011) Defensive backs coach; Kentucky Christian (2012) Defensive backs coach; Marshall (2013) Defensive quality control; Kentucky Christian (2014) Defensive coordinator; Reinhardt (2015–2023) Defensive coordinator; Dalton HS (GA) (2026–present) Defensive coordinator

Awards and highlights
- Consensus All-American (2005); First-team All-SEC (2005)

Career NFL statistics
- Total tackles: 23
- Fumble recoveries: 1
- Pass deflections: 1
- Stats at Pro Football Reference

Gregory B. Blue Jr. (born March 12, 1982) is an American college football coach and former player who is currently the defensive coordinator for Dalton High School in Dalton, Georgia. He played professionally as a defensive back in the National Football League (NFL). Blue played college football for the Georgia Bulldogs, earning consensus All-American honors in 2005. The Minnesota Vikings selected him in the fifth round of the 2006 NFL draft.

== Early life ==
Blue was born in Atlanta. He attended Banneker High School in College Park, Georgia, graduating in the class of 2001. As a senior in 2000, he was named to The Atlanta Journal-Constitution Super Southern 100, Top 50 in Georgia, Class AAA All-State first-team, and Marvelous Metro 11 squad as a defensive back. He also received Georgia Sports Writers Association All-State and Super Prep All-Dixie Team accolades. He was named one of the top 25 safeties in the country by Student Sports Magazine. As a senior, he recorded 89 tackles, six forced fumbles, four interceptions, and 14 pass break-ups. He also had an 88-yard kickoff return for a touchdown and a 65-yard punt return for a score that year and helped his team to the 2000 Class AAA state playoffs with a 9–2 record. As a member of the basketball team, he was invited to play in the 2001 Georgia North-South All-Star Game.

== College career ==
Blue enrolled in the University of Georgia, where he played for coach Mark Richt's Georgia Bulldogs football team from 2001 to 2005. While attending Georgia, he registered 176 of his 260 career tackles, eleven of his thirteen quarterback pressures and all 7.5 of his stops behind the line of scrimmage during his last two seasons. Blue was part of a graduating class that earned 44 victories, the most by any senior class in Georgia history. He was redshirted as a freshman in 2001. In 2002, he played as a reserve safety, appearing in every game. He finished with 42 tackles and a pass deflection. He was part of a defense that finished first in the Southeastern Conference (SEC) and fourth nationally in scoring defense (15.1 ppg), first in the SEC in red zone defense (58.8%), second in the SEC and 19th nationally in rushing defense (114.0 ypg), fourth in the SEC and 15th nationally in total defense (303.5 ypg), and allowed only 30 total second half points in the final seven games of the season.

The next year, he recorded 42 tackles with two quarterback pressures and three pass deflections. He was part of a Georgia defense that ranked second nationally in scoring defense (14.5 ppg), fourth in total defense (276.86 ypg), sixth in passing defense (174.50 ypg), 14th nationally in turnover margin (+.79), and fourth in number of scoreless quarters (25) among the Associated Press final Top Ten teams.

During his junior year, he was clocked at running a 9.10 100 yard dash time recipient of the Teka and John Adams Football Scholarship. He started all year at Rover, finishing second on the team with 80 tackles (64 solos), and also was credited with a 10-yard sack, three stops for losses of 12 yards and five quarterback pressures. He caused three fumbles and recovered another and deflected three passes. Blue was part of a team that has posted 42–10 record from 2001 to 2004 (sixth best in the country), three straight seasons of 10 or more wins, three straight bowl victories, and three consecutive national top six finishes.

In his last year, he was an All-American first-team selection by the Walter Camp Football Foundation, the Associated Press, and the American Football Coaches Association, adding second-team honors from The NFL Draft Report. As well as an All-Southeastern Conference first-team choice. He started all year at Rover, leading the team with a career-high 96 tackles (70 solos). He also added 4.5 stops for losses of 14 yards and had six quarterback pressures. He recovered and caused a fumble and intercepted two passes and deflected five others. Blue led a secondary that ranked seventh in the nation in pass defense (169.62 ypg) and pass efficiency defense (105.88 rating) while being named team co-captain. Blue majored in Child and Family Development. While he was an undergraduate, he was initiated as a member of Phi Beta Sigma fraternity.

== Professional career ==
Pre-draft measurables
Height	Weight	Arm length	Hand span	40-yard dash	10-yard split	20-yard split	20-yard shuttle	Three-cone drill	Vertical jump	Broad jump	Bench press
6 ft 2 1/4 in (1.89 m)	216 lb (98 kg)	33 in (0.84 m)	9 1/8 in (0.23 m)	4.55 s	1.60 s	2.70 s	4.28 s	7.09 s	37.5 in (0.95 m)	10 ft 0 in (3.05 m)	16 reps
All values from NFL Combine/Pro Day

=== Minnesota Vikings ===
Blue was selected by the Minnesota Vikings in the fifth round (149th overall) of the 2006 NFL draft. He played in all 16 games (two starts) as a rookie, primarily on special teams, and recorded 14 tackles (12 solo). He was released by the team at the conclusion of training camp in 2007.

=== Detroit Lions ===
Blue worked out for the Carolina Panthers in October, but was not signed. On November 19, he was signed by the Detroit Lions after safety Idrees Bashir was placed on Injured Reserve. On December 9, Blue recovered a Jason Witten fumble in a loss to the Dallas Cowboys. After the 2008 preseason, he was waived by the Lions during final cuts on August 30, 2008.

=== Toronto Argonauts ===
On April 6, 2010, Blue signed with the Toronto Argonauts of the Canadian Football League, but was released by the team during training camp on June 6, 2010.

On January 24, 2011, Blue was re-signed by the Argonauts for another season. On June 9, 2011, he was released by the team during training camp.
