= International Charter School of Atlanta =

Public charter school in Roswell, Fulton County, Georgia, United States

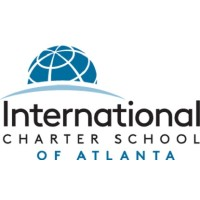

Location
- 1335 Northmeadow Parkway, Suite 100 & 1675 Hembree Road; Roswell & Alpharetta (Note: Lower campus located in Roswell while Upper Campus located in Alpharetta.), Georgia 30076 & 30009; United States; 34°03′33″N 84°18′50″W (Note: Lower Campus)

Information
- Type: Charter
- Established: 2015
- School district: Fulton County School System
- Principal: Tanya Parker
- Teaching staff: 55.8
- Grades: K–8
- Enrollment: 840
- Student to teacher ratio: 15
- Mascot: Wolf

The International Charter School of Atlanta is a K-8 charter school in Roswell and Alpharetta, Georgia, United States. It offers Dual Language Immersion and language instruction in French, German, Mandarin, and Spanish. The school has a statewide attendance zone and while being located in Fulton County.

== History ==
On May 15, 2014, ICSAtlanta submitted a charter petition to the State Charter Schools commission of Georgia, which was used to apply for authorization as a state charter school. The school's charter was approved for five years, and has recurringly been approved since. The school was intended to eventually offer grades K-12, but to this day remains a K-8 school. The main charter petitioner was Marisa Kashapov. The School opened its doors in the lower campus in August 2015, and for a period only offered grades K-5 before expanding to a K-8.

== Activities ==
While offering a sports club, ICSAtlanta does not offer inter-scholastic sports teams. While not offering official sports, the school does offer many clubs, such as:

- Dungeons and Dragons Club
- Reading Bowl Club
- Chess Club
- Digital Photography Club
- Debate Club
- Page to Screen Club
- CPR, AED, & First Aid Certification Club
