= Ty Toney =

American basketball player

Tymetrius Montovia Toney
Personal information
- Born: November 27, 1994 (age 31) Alpharetta, Georgia, U.S.
- Listed height: 1.91 m (6 ft 3 in)
- Listed weight: 101 kg (223 lb)

Career information
- NBA draft: 2017: undrafted
- Position: Point guard

Career history
- 2018–2019: Esgueira
- 2019–2025: Sporting CP
- 2026: Rayos de Hermosillo

Tymetrius Montovia Toney (born November 27, 1994) is an American professional basketball player who plays for Sporting CP.

Before leaving United States, Ty played for Eastern Michigan Eagles.
