= Cynergy Data =

Payment processing company in the US

Cynergy Data.
- Type: Private
- Industry: Payment processor
- Founded: 1995
- Founder: Marcelo Paladini
- Defunct: 2014
- Fate: Acquired after bankruptcy
- Successor: Priority Technology Holdings
- Headquarters: Alpharetta, Georgia, United States
- Area served: United States
- Key people: Afshin Yazdian, CEO
- Products: Payment processing, small business loans, point-of-sale hardware and software, gateway payment services, gift cards, high-risk merchant processing and providing payment terminals
- Owner: Comvest Group
- Website: www.cynergydata.com

Cynergy Data was an American payment service provider that was headquartered in Alpharetta, Georgia with an operations center in Long Island City, New York.

Cynergy Data was acquired out of bankruptcy by private investment firm Comvest Group in 2009. In 2014, Comvest merged the company with Priority Payments to create a new payment company called Priority Technology Holdings.

Cynergy Data had been recognized three times by Inc. magazine as one of the fastest-growing privately held companies in America prior to its bankruptcy. The company went through bankruptcy protection in 2009.

== History ==
=== 1995 - 2007 ===
Cynergy Data was founded in 1995 by Marcelo Paladini as a support organization for those selling electronic payments processing to merchant businesses.

In 1997, Inc. Magazine featured the company in its annual list of the fastest growing, privately held companies in the United States. With a 33% increase in sales for the year 2001 alone, Cynergy Data ranks 451 on the list. In 2002, New York City's Hispanic Chamber of Commerce names Cynergy founders "Entrepreneurs of the Year".

In 2006, Inner City 100 ranked Cynergy Data as number 36 on their list of fastest-growing private companies based in U.S. cities. In April, Cynergy Data acquires Abanco International merchant portfolio and payment gateway services. The acquisition allowed the company to process billions of credit card and other electronic payments annually.

=== 2008 - 2014 ===
The company partnered with Déjavoo Systems in 2008 to develop merchant solutions.

That same year, point-of-sale provider AccuPOS formed an integration partnership with Cynergy Data's LUCY payment gateway. Cynergy Data was added to Inc. Magazine's Hall of Fame for making its Inner City 100 list five years in a row.

In 2009, Cynergy Data filed a liquidating Chapter 11 plan, with the warning that its assets would only cover lawsuit from holders of first-lien debt. It later received approval from the United States bankruptcy court for the sale of its assets.

Cynergy Data selected TSYS as its preferred provider of authorization, settlement and dispute resolution services.

Kim Fitzsimmons was CEO of the company from 2012 to 2013. In November 2013, Afshin Yazdian was appointed President & CEO of Cynergy Data.

=== Merger 2014 ===
In 2014, the company was merged with Priority Payments to form a new company known as Priority Technology Holdings and the Cynergy Data name ended.
