= Alan Herron =

Jamaican gridiron football player (born 2003)

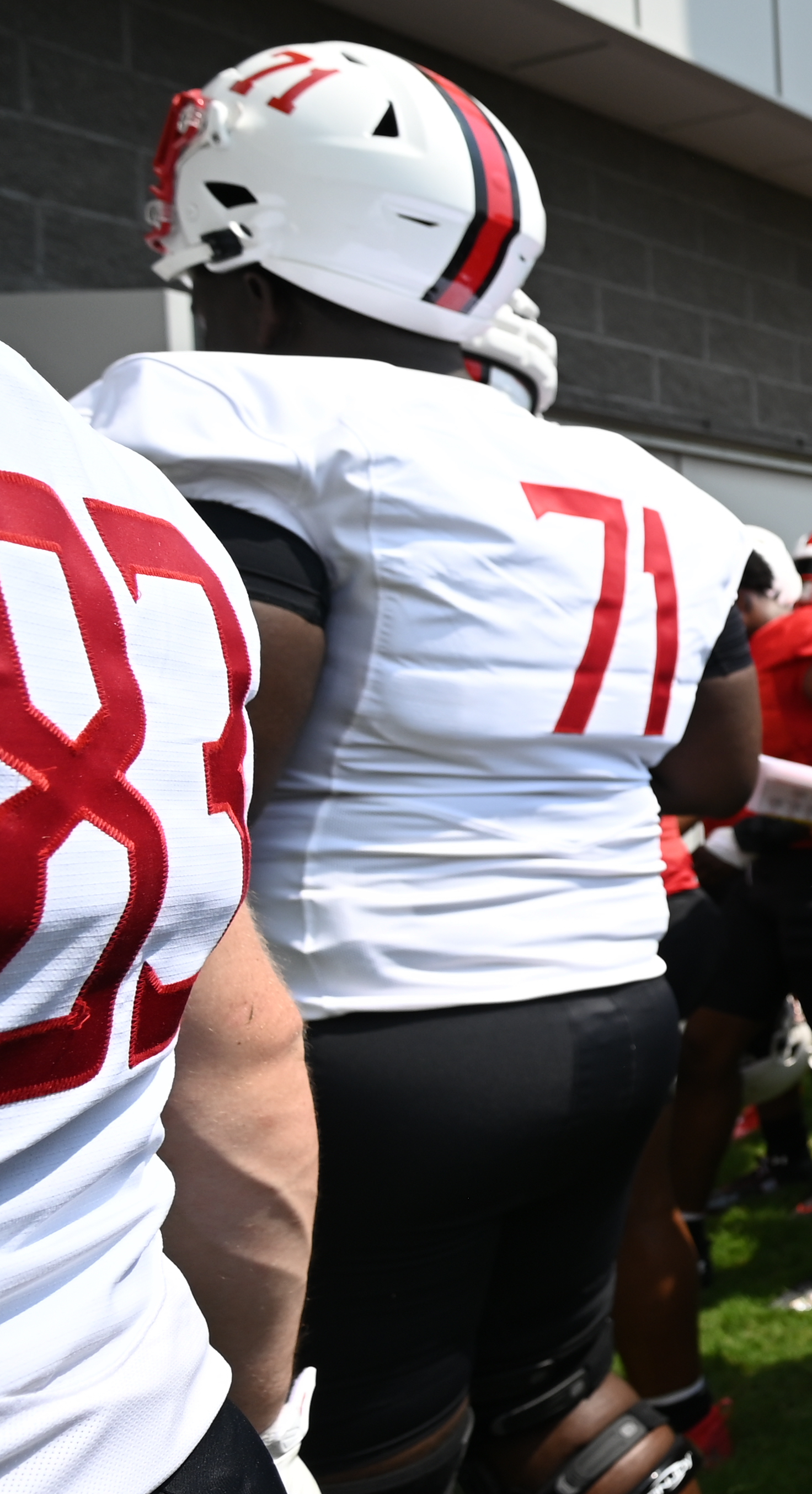
- Herron with Maryland in 2024

No. 70 – New Orleans Saints
- Position: Offensive tackle
- Roster status: Practice squad

Personal information
- Born: March 10, 2003 (age 23); Westmoreland Parish, Jamaica
- Listed height: 6 ft 5 in (1.96 m)
- Listed weight: 308 lb (140 kg)

Career information
- High school: Banneker (Union City, Georgia)
- College: Shorter (2022–2023); Maryland (2024–2025)
- NFL draft: 2026: undrafted

Career history
- New Orleans Saints (2026–present)*
- * Offseason or practice squad member only
- Stats at Pro Football Reference

Alan Herron (born March 10, 2003) is a Jamaican professional football offensive tackle for the New Orleans Saints of the National Football League (NFL). He played college football for the Shorter Hawks and Maryland Terrapins.

== Early life ==
Herron was born on March 10, 2003, in Westmoreland Parish, Jamaica. He played baseball, cricket, and soccer in his youth. Herron moved to the United States to attend Banneker High School in Union City, Georgia, where he initially played varsity baseball and batted .406 as a junior and .389 as a senior. He joined the football team as a senior at the suggestion of his teacher, who doubled as the football coach. Herron lined up as a 270-pound left tackle that season, occasionally playing on the defensive line as well. He helped the team advance to the 2021 Georgia High School Association Class 5A state playoffs and was invited to play in the South Fulton all-star game.

Given his inexperience in football, Herron was not heavily recruited and did not receive any stars by 247Sports. However, in the lead-up to National Signing Day, he received multiple offers from NCAA Division II and III programs. Herron committed to playing college football at Shorter University over offers such as Fayetteville State, Fort Valley State, and West Virginia State. He was also offered a preferred walk-on spot at Grambling State.

== College career ==
Herron played his first two years of college football for the Shorter Hawks. As a freshman in 2022, he started all 11 games at right tackle. As a sophomore in 2023, Herron started all 11 games at both right and left tackle. He entered the NCAA transfer portal after the season; he was able to enter early due to being a Division II player. Herron was rated as the No. 23 and No. 26 offensive tackle in the portal by On3.com and 247Sports, respectively. He received over 30 offers, including Auburn, Clemson, Houston, Louisville, Maryland, Miami, Penn State, Texas Tech and Virginia Tech.

On December 11, 2023, Herron verbally committed to Penn State. However, less than two weeks later, he flipped his commitment to Maryland. Herron immediately earned the starting job for the Terrapins at right tackle, starting all 12 games as a junior in 2024. However, according to The Athletic, "[h]is junior tape was barely worthy of being on the NFL radar". As a senior in 2025, Herron once again started all 12 games at right tackle. He was a key member of an offensive line which allowed just nine quarterback sacks on the season – the fifth fewest in the country. Herron earned All-Big Ten honorable mention for his performance. He was penalized for holding just once in his 24 starts at Maryland. Herron was invited to play in the inaugural edition of The American Bowl, and his performance led to a late call-up to the Senior Bowl.

== Professional career ==
=== Pre-draft ===
In December 2025, Herron announced his decision to enter the 2026 NFL draft. He was one of two Maryland players invited to the NFL Scouting Combine, where he was ranked as the 16th best offensive tackle prospect. Herron attended pre-draft visits with multiple teams, including the Atlanta Falcons, New Orleans Saints, and Washington Commanders, as well as a private workout with the Baltimore Ravens. He participated in Maryland's pro day on March 27, 2026, followed by the Commanders local pro day (Note: Most of the 37 invitees had ties to the DMV area.) on April 8.

External videos
- Alan Herron runs the 40-yard dash

Herron was projected to be a late-round pick or priority undrafted free agent. He was ranked as the 19th-best offensive tackle prospect in the draft by ESPN analyst Jordan Reid, was ranked as the 20th-best offensive tackle by NFL.com analyst Lance Zierlein, and was ranked as the 21st-best offensive tackle in the draft by The Athletic analyst Dane Brugler (creator of The Beast draft guide) and ESPN.

Pre-draft measurables
Height	Weight	Arm length	Hand span	Wingspan	40-yard dash	10-yard split	20-yard split	20-yard shuttle	Three-cone drill	Vertical jump	Broad jump	Bench press
6 ft 5 1/4 in (1.96 m)	308 lb (140 kg)	33 1/8 in (0.84 m)	9 1/8 in (0.23 m)	6 ft 9 1/8 in (2.06 m)	5.09 s	1.84 s	2.98 s	4.91 s	7.57 s	32 in (0.81 m)	8 ft 2 in (2.49 m)	23 reps
All values from NFL Combine/Pro Day

=== New Orleans Saints ===
After going unselected in the 2026 NFL draft, Herron signed a undrafted free agent contract with the New Orleans Saints on April 25, 2026. He was waived by the Saints on August 30 as a part of final roster cuts, and was re–signed to the practice squad the following day. On October 16, Herron was released. On October 27, he was re-signed to the practice squad.

== Personal life ==
As a senior at Maryland, Herron was an academic all-Big Ten selection and was honored with the George C. Cook Memorial Award at the team banquet as the senior with highest grade point average.
