= Alpharetta High School =

High school in Georgia, United States

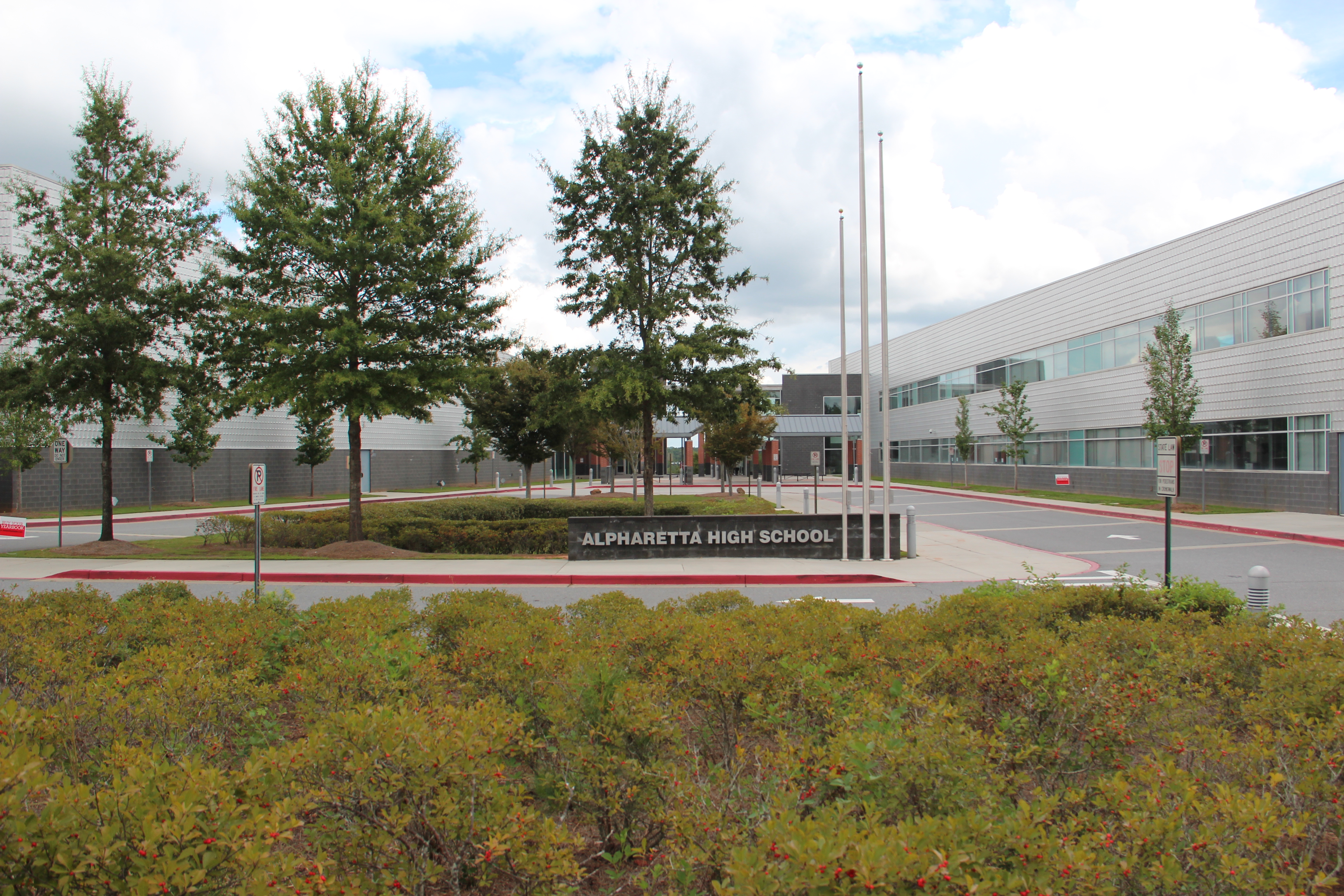

Location
- Alpharetta, Georgia; United States; 34°04′41″N 84°15′22″W

Information
- Type: Public
- Established: 2004
- CEEB code: 110058
- NCES School ID: 130228003364
- Principal: Michael Scheifflee (August 2023–present)
- Grades: 9–12
- Enrollment: 2,084 (2023-2024)
- Colors: Maroon, silver, and black
- Slogan: "To be nationally competitive in academics, the arts, athletics, and service to the community."
- Mascot: Rowdy Raider
- Website: alpharettahs.fultonschools.org

Alpharetta High School is a public high school located in Alpharetta, Georgia, United States within the Fulton County School System. Atlanta Magazine named Alpharetta High School one of the metro Atlanta area's best all-around high schools. In 2026, the U.S. News & World Report ranked the school #20 in Georgia and #622 nationally.

== History ==
The school was opened in 2004 to educate students in grades 9 to 12. The school was opened due to the growing number of students in Chattahoochee High School. The 330,000 square foot school was designed by Perkins and Will with sustainable design in mind. It was relieved by the 2012 opening of Cambridge High School.

== Alpharetta cluster ==
Alpharetta High is part of a cluster of schools in Fulton County that interact closely and educate students from kindergarten through 12th grade.

- Creek View Elementary School
- Lake Windward Elementary
- Manning Oaks Elementary School
- Ocee Elementary School
- New Prospect Elementary School
- Webb Bridge Middle School
- Hopewell Middle School

== Athletics ==
Competitive sports at Alpharetta High School are football, basketball, baseball, lacrosse, soccer, wrestling, tennis, track and field, cross country, volleyball, swimming, diving, cheerleading, and golf. Although not officially recognized by the Georgia High School Association, additional athletic activities include rugby, fencing, chess, cricket, and ping pong.

== Fine arts ==
=== Band ===
The Alpharetta High School Band Program has grown from 28 original members to over 200 members and warrants its own 10,000 SF building. The program includes three concert ensembles: Symphonic Band II, Symphonic Band I, and Wind Ensemble. AHS Band members have consistently earned multiple seats in the GA All State Band, university honor bands, and district and county honor bands. Many graduates continue to play in colleges across the country, and several AHS Band Program graduates are now band directors. The advanced Wind Ensemble has performed all over the country, from California to New York. It has been invited to perform at Music for All, Disney's Festival of Gold, several university band clinics (including Alabama, UGA, and GSU), The GMEA state convention, and the National Concert Band Festival at Carnegie Hall in NYC. The program also includes an award-winning competitive marching band, competitive indoor percussion ensemble, and an extensive nationally competitive indoor color guard program. Many graduates of the marching band program go on to perform with DCI and university bands.

=== Orchestra ===
The Alpharetta High School Orchestra is split into five ensembles: Concert, Philharmonia, Sinfonia, Symphony, and Chamber (in ascending order of skill level). The orchestra's Symphony ensemble frequently collaborate with the band in order to perform and compete as a full symphony orchestra.

=== Music Technology ===
In 2018 Alpharetta High School opened a new, state-of-the-art 24-seat Music Technology Lab. It is a one-of-a-kind Lab in Fulton County that gives each individual student a custom-built personal audio engineering space. The lab is all connected through Korg's GEC5 audio communication system and Apple Remote Desktop. The focus of the two-year program is audio production, using the full, professional version of Pro Tools as the foundation. The goal of the AHS Music Tech Program is to create a foundation and pathway for students to become audio mix engineers and producers.

== Extracurriculars ==
Alpharetta High School has many extracurricular activities and about 73 clubs. Most of these clubs occur either before or after school. Many occur during Anchor Time, a 30-minute period between first and second lunch period that takes place every day. Notable clubs include Future Business Leaders of America (FBLA), Raider Ambassadors, National Honors Society, Science Olympiad, Model United Nations, and Beta. Students may also form their own clubs.

== International Baccalaureate ==
In the 2018-2019 school year, Alpharetta High School was chosen to become an International Baccalaureate (IB) school. Although the school already offers Advanced Placement (AP) courses and Dual Enrollment courses at various colleges, the IB courses are completely new. Students will be allowed to complete the IB Diploma Programme by taking the required classes, or they may take specific IB classes along with other classes.

== Awards ==
=== Academic ===
- The school was the recipient of the 2007-2008 Governors Cup for the AAAAA school with the highest increase in SAT scores.
- Alpharetta High School was nationally ranked in Newsweek's "Best High Schools 2012," coming in at 268.
- The school has been consistently at the top of the US News report, and was ranked #4 for the best Georgia high schools in 2020.

=== Athletic ===
- The 2008 girls' cross country team were Region 6-AAAAA Champions and placed 6th in the state.
- The 2007 girls' track and field team was Region 6-AAAAA Champions and placed seventh in the state.
- The 2009 competition cheerleaders were Region 6-AAAAA Champions and placed seventh in the state.
- The 2009-10 boys' ice hockey team won the state championship (AA).
- The 2010 boys' tennis team won the school's first state championship (AAAAA).
- The 2010 competition cheerleaders won the state championship (AAAAA).
- The 2011-12 boys' ice hockey team won the state championship (AA).

=== Quizbowl ===
- The Academic Team won the 2007–2008 Annual High Q competition, which airs on WSB-TV. They were originally alternates for the competition.
- In the 2013-2014 season, the varsity quizbowl team won the ATTACK III and GATA Winter Tournaments. The Junior varsity team won the GATA State tournament. Both the varsity and junior varsity teams won the MLK Day History Bowl Regional. The team was ranked 84th in the national quizbowl rankings at the end of the season.
- In the 2014-2015 season, the varsity quizbowl team finished third at the 25th Annual Walton Academic Challenge and won both the History Bowl and Bee Regional at Athens.

=== Speech and debate team ===
- The school's varsity speech and debate team placed second in the State Championship in the spring of 2009.
- The school's varsity speech and debate team placed fifth at the All-State competition in 2009.

=== Arts ===
The school's symphony orchestra, composed of nearly 90 select band and orchestra students, was chosen to perform at Chicago's 2012 and 2018 Midwest Clinic. Of thousands of schools that auditioned all over the world, The 2012 Alpharetta Symphony Orchestra was the only high school full symphony chosen that year, and included the first wind section from Fulton County Schools to ever be invited to perform at Midwest Clinic.

The school's Indoor Percussion ensemble won first place in the 2026 Percussion A Class Finals with a score of 97.850, 2.312 points ahead of second place. This was their first year competing at WGI and their fourth year wining GIPA.

== Notable alumni ==
- Auzoyah Alufohai ('14), NFL football nose tackle
- Ronald Chase Amick ('18), stage name 6 Dogs, rapper and songwriter
- Michael Bennett ('10), football wide receiver
- Croix Bethune ('19), NWSL soccer player
- Devontae Cacok ('15), basketball player
- Joshua Dobbs ('13), football player
- Jaycee Horn ('18), football player
- Ellis Merriweather ('17), NFL running back
- Ariana Savalas ('05), singer-songwriter
- William Wagner ('19), NFL football long snapper
