= Terrance Parks =

American football player (born 1990)

No. 31, 42
- Position: Safety

Personal information
- Born: April 14, 1990 (age 36); Fairburn, Georgia, U.S.
- Listed height: 6 ft 2 in (1.88 m)
- Listed weight: 215 lb (98 kg)

Career information
- High school: Creekside (Fairburn)
- College: Florida State
- NFL draft: 2012: undrafted

Career history
- Kansas City Chiefs (2012)*; Hamilton Tiger-Cats (2013); Seattle Seahawks (2014); Houston Texans (2014–2015)*; Atlanta Falcons (2015)*; Winnipeg Blue Bombers (2017)*; Atlanta Falcons (2018)*; Orlando Apollos (2019)
- * Offseason or practice squad member only
- Stats at Pro Football Reference

Terrance Parks (born April 14, 1990) is an American former professional football player who was a safety in the National Football League (NFL). He played college football for the Florida State Seminoles. He was not selected in the 2012 NFL draft, but signed with the Kansas City Chiefs as an undrafted free agent. Parks attended Creekside High School in Fairburn, Georgia, where he was teammates with Eric Berry and Rokevious Watkins.

== Professional career ==
=== Kansas City Chiefs ===
After going undrafted in the 2012 NFL draft, Parks spent the 2012 NFL season as a member of the Kansas City Chiefs.

=== Hamilton Tiger-Cats ===
Parks was signed in the off-season by the Hamilton Tiger-Cats of the Canadian Football League. He was released by the team on June 17, 2013, and then resigned 5 days later on June 22, 2013. He was added to the Ti-Cats injury list on June 23, 2013 until July 6, 2013, when he returned to the team. He was placed back on the injury list from July 12 to 20, 2013. He was then released by the Ti-Cats after Week 4 of the regular season.

=== Seattle Seahawks ===
After being cut by the Seattle Seahawks prior to the start of the 2014-2015 NFL Season, Parks signed to the teams' practice squad on September 7, 2014. He was promoted to the active roster on November 1, 2014.

=== Houston Texans ===
After being released by the Seattle Seahawks, Parks was signed to the Houston Texans practice squad on November 26, 2014. He was released in September 2015 after an injury settlement.

=== Atlanta Falcons ===
Parks was signed to the Atlanta Falcons practice squad on December 8, 2015.

=== Winnipeg Blue Bombers ===
On April 19, 2017, Parks signed with the Winnipeg Blue Bombers of the Canadian Football League. He was released by the Bombers on May 17, 2017.

=== Atlanta Falcons (second stint) ===
On July 25, 2018, Parks signed with the Atlanta Falcons. He was released on July 30, 2018.

=== Orlando Apollos ===
Parks signed with the Orlando Apollos of the Alliance of American Football on February 11, 2019, after Jacob Pugh was placed on injured reserve. The league ceased operations in April 2019.
