= Taste of Alpharetta =

Coordinates: 34.0753°N 84.2944°W

Taste of Alpharetta is a festival/event where over 60 restaurants offer a wide range of foods. Established in 1991, it's located in Alpharetta, Georgia and drew over 60,000 people one year. Restaurants typically sell small "tasting" size portions which are typical of the restaurants' offerings from tables and tents. The event also features games, live concerts, culinary competitions, and art exhibits. In 2010, local chefs created over 200,000 dishes which were served at the festival. According to local and regional media, the Taste of Alpharetta is now one of the most popular and well-attended “taste of” festivals in the South.

Many desserts appetizers and entrees are offered during the festival. There are moonwalks, many different performing bands, and many places to sit down and eat. It has been celebrated for two decades of delivering good food. The Taste of Alpharetta is held annually on a Thursday during the month of May.
