= FCS Innovation Academy =

Public high school in Alpharetta, Fulton County, Georgia, United States

Location
- 125 Milton Avenue; Alpharetta, Georgia 30009; United States
- 34°04′34″N 84°17′57″W

Information
- Type: Magnet high school
- Established: 2021
- School district: Fulton County School System
- CEEB code: 110387
- Principal: Scott Kent
- Teaching staff: 84
- Grades: 9–12
- Enrollment: 1,433 (2025–2026)
- Student to teacher ratio: 17.06
- Colors: Orange, white and Blue-gray
- Athletics conference: Georgia High School Association
- Mascot: Phoenix

FCS Innovation Academy is a four-year public, Magnet school in Alpharetta, Georgia, United States. The STEM Magnet School offers three career pathways for students to elect, those being Healthcare, IT, and Engineering.

== History ==
FCS Innovation Academy opened in 2021 in Alpharetta, Georgia, at that point only providing Freshman and Sophomore years. Since its establishment, it has grown to offer all four years of High School. In the 2023–2024 school year, it had its first graduating class. It was built on the former grounds of the Milton High School campus.

== Activities ==
FCS Innovation Academy does not offer sports associated with the Georgia High School Association, with the exception of eSports, while also offering Fencing through the Georgia High School Fencing League (GHSFL). The school instead allows for athletes to play sports for their zoned-schools.

=== State sports championships ===
- eSports (Splatoon 3): 2024
- Fencing (women's): 2023-2024
