= Creekside High School (Georgia) =

Public high school in Fairburn, Georgia, United States

Location
- 7405 Herndon Road; Fairburn, Georgia; United States; 33°33′23″N 84°37′35″W

Information
- Motto: "Unity, Safety and Achievement"
- Established: 1990
- School district: Fulton County School System
- CEEB code: 111265
- NCES School ID: 130228002120
- Principal: Terrell A. G. Awak
- Teaching staff: 100.90 (FTE)
- Grades: 9–12
- Student to teacher ratio: 17.29
- Colors: Cardinal Red and Vegas Gold
- Athletics conference: Region 4-4A
- Mascot: Semi the Seminole
- Website: creekside.fultonschools.org

Creekside High School is a public high school serving grades nine through twelve. It is located in Fairburn, Georgia, United States. It is a part of the Fulton County School System.

The school opened in the fall of 1990 as a result of the merger of Campbell High School in Fairburn and Palmetto High School in Palmetto. The merger happened as a result of a consolidation plan to reduce the costs of the school system, comply with new state laws mandating minimum attendance numbers for government-funded schools, and upgrade the course offerings of all schools in the county.

== Athletics ==
Creekside offers baseball, basketball, cheerleading, cross country, flag football, football, esports, golf, soccer, softball, swimming, tennis, track and field, volleyball, and wrestling.

In its first year of existence, Creekside won the 4 × 400-meter relay at the Georgia High School Association (GHSA) Boys’ State Track Meet, while Octavius Terry won the 300-meter intermediate hurdles and was named the meet’s Most Outstanding Performer. In 1995, the varsity boys’ basketball team reached the state semifinals. In 2001, the varsity football team advanced to the state semifinals at the Georgia Dome. During the 2000–2001 season, the girls’ varsity basketball team also reached the state semifinals. In 2002, the boys’ basketball team competed against local rival Westlake High School for the Class AAAA state championship. The team entered the 2002–2003 season ranked first in the state and later reached the state quarterfinals during the 2012–2013 season.

In 2013, the Creekside Seminoles football team captured its first GHSA Class AAAAA state championship, completing an undefeated 15–0 season with a 52–28 victory over Tucker High School at the Georgia Dome. The championship season followed the death of defensive back DeAntre Turman, who died after sustaining an injury during a preseason scrimmage. The team dedicated its season to his memory.

Maurice Dixon era (2017–present)

In 2017, Maurice Dixon became head coach of the Creekside Seminoles football program. During his first season, the team finished with an 0–10 record. The Seminoles improved to 8–5 in 2018, including a 7–1 regional record, and returned to the state playoffs. Over the following seasons, Creekside recorded multiple region championships and deep postseason appearances under Dixon’s leadership.

In 2023, Dixon led Creekside to a 13–2 record and an appearance in the GHSA Class AAAAA state championship game, marking the program’s first state championship appearance since 2013. The Seminoles finished as state runners-up after falling 31–14 to Coffee High School. Creekside continued its postseason success in 2024, finishing 10–3 and advancing to the Class AAAA state quarterfinals.

The program reached another milestone during the 2025 season, when Dixon guided the Seminoles to an undefeated 15–0 record and their second state football championship in school history. On December 15, 2025, Creekside defeated Benedictine Military School 42–39 in the GHSA Class AAAA state championship game at Mercedes-Benz Stadium in Atlanta, securing the school’s first football state title in 12 years and Dixon’s first championship as head coach.

During the 2025 championship campaign, Creekside established a Georgia high school football single-season scoring record with 845 points, averaging more than 56 points per game. Quarterback Cayden Benson, running back Gary Walker, and running back Ced Kelly contributed to the team’s offense, while its defense allowed an average of 8.3 points per game.

The 2025 championship marked the culmination of the program’s progression under Dixon, from a winless season in 2017 to an undefeated state championship season eight years later.

== Marching band ==
Creekside's marching band is the S.O.S. Express and the dance team is the Golden Essence.

== Notable alumni ==
- Javon Baker - NFL player
- Eric Berry - NFL player
- Evan Berry - All-American college football player for the University of Tennessee
- Gunna - Rapper
- Joshua Holsey - NFL player
- OG Maco - Rapper
- Kevin Murphy - professional basketball player
- Nivea - singer
- Terrence Parks - NFL player
- Octavius Terry - NCAA Champion hurdler, U.S. Olympic Trial Contestant
- Pastor Troy - rapper
- Rokevious Watkins - NFL player
