= John Hurst (American football) =

American football player (born 1996)

No. 6
- Position: Wide receiver

Personal information
- Born: November 2, 1996 (age 30); Atlanta, Georgia, U.S.
- Listed height: 6 ft 2 in (1.88 m)
- Listed weight: 190 lb (86 kg)

Career information
- High school: Cambridge (Milton, Georgia)
- College: West Georgia
- NFL draft: 2020: undrafted

Career history
- Tampa Bay Buccaneers (2020); Los Angeles Chargers (2020–2021)*; Tampa Bay Buccaneers (2021)*; Indianapolis Colts (2022)*
- * Offseason or practice squad member only

Awards and highlights
- First-team All-GSC (2019)
- Stats at Pro Football Reference

John Hurst (born November 2, 1996) is an American former professional football wide receiver. He played college football at West Georgia.

== Early life ==
Hurst grew up in Milton, Georgia and attended Cambridge High School. As a senior, he caught 63 passes for 834 yards and seven touchdowns and was named All-North Fulton.

== College career ==
Hurst was a member of the West Georgia Wolves for five seasons, redshirting as a true freshman. He caught 40 passes for 654 yards and seven touchdowns and was named first-team All-Gulf South Conference as a senior. Hurst finished his collegiate career with 77 receptions for 1,242 yards and 12 touchdowns in 35 games played and was named to West Georgia's All-Decade Team for the 2010s. After his senior season, Hurst declared for the 2020 NFL draft, where he went undrafted.

== Professional career ==
Pre-draft measurables
Height	Weight	Arm length	Hand span	40-yard dash	10-yard split	20-yard split	20-yard shuttle	Three-cone drill	Vertical jump	Broad jump	Bench press
6 ft 1 in (1.85 m)	195 lb (88 kg)	31 5/8 in (0.80 m)	9 1/8 in (0.23 m)	4.50 s	1.56 s	2.53 s	4.19 s	7.38 s	38.0 in (0.97 m)	10 ft 1 in (3.07 m)	15 reps
All values from Pro Day

=== Tampa Bay Buccaneers (first stint) ===
Hurst was signed by the Tampa Bay Buccaneers as undrafted free agent on May 4, 2020, and made the team out of training camp. He was placed on injured reserve on September 7, 2020. Hurst was activated off the injured reserve on October 19, 2020, subsequently waived the next day, and signed to the practice squad on October 22. He was released on November 5.

=== Los Angeles Chargers ===
On November 16, 2020, Hurst signed with the practice squad of the Los Angeles Chargers. He signed a reserve/future contract with the Chargers on January 5, 2021. He was waived on August 30, 2021.

=== Tampa Bay Buccaneers (second stint) ===
On September 21, 2021, Hurst signed with the Buccaneers' practice squad. He was released on November 10. He was re-signed on November 24. He was released on December 14. He was re-signed on January 11, 2022.

=== Indianapolis Colts ===
On July 26, 2022, Hurst signed with the Indianapolis Colts. On August 2, Hurst was placed on injured reserve. He was waived/injured on August 9.

== Coaching career ==
On January 31, 2024, Hurst was named the head coach at A. P. Leto High School in Tampa, Florida.
