= Banneker High School (Georgia) =

Location
- 6015 Feldwood Road; College Park address, Georgia 30349; United States; 33°35′35″N 84°31′06″W

Information
- Other name: Benjamin Banneker High School
- Type: Public high school
- School district: Fulton County School System
- NCES School ID: 130228000967
- Principal: Vincent G. Golden
- Teaching staff: 121.00 (on an FTE basis)
- Grades: 9–12
- Enrollment: 1,786 (2023-2024)
- Student to teacher ratio: 14.76
- Colors: Red and silver
- Nickname: Trojans
- Website: banneker.fultonschools.org

Banneker High School (also known as Benjamin Banneker High School) is a public high school in Union City, Georgia, United States, with a College Park, Georgia postal address. It is part of the Fulton County School System and named for Benjamin Banneker, a free African-American almanac author, surveyor, landowner and farmer.

In 2024 a center providing health services opened at the school.

== Notable alumni ==
- Greg Blue – former professional football player
- Gunna – rapper
- Alan Herron – NFL offensive tackle for the New Orleans Saints
- Toby Johnson – former professional football player
- Ludacris – rapper and actor
- Mr. Collipark – hip-hop record producer
- Mr. DJ – hip-hop record producer
- Jason Rogers – professional baseball player
- Supa Nate – rapper
- Darius Watts – former professional football player
- Yung Joc – rapper and entrepreneur
