= Georgia Rugby Union (United States) =

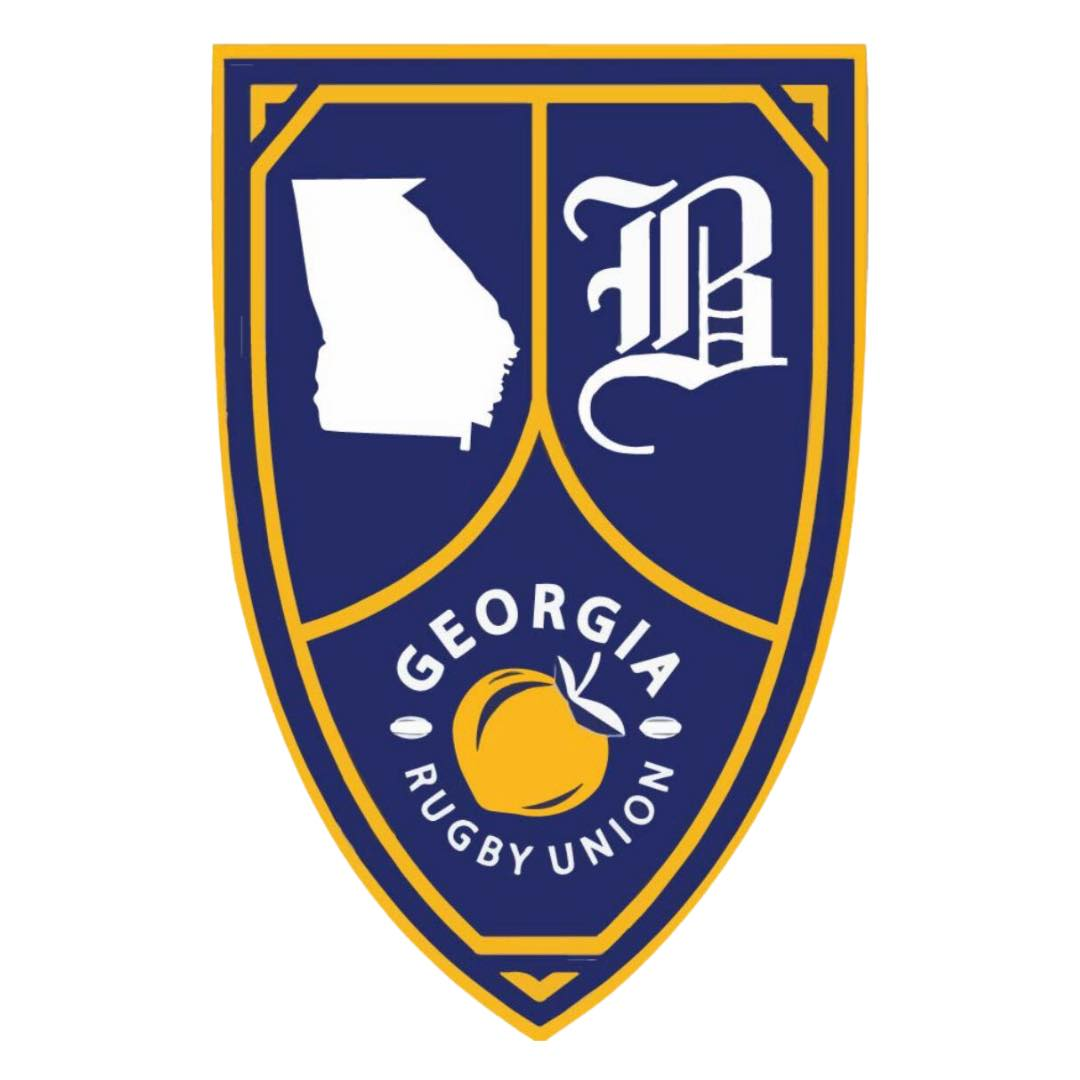

The Georgia Rugby Union (GRU) is the geographical union (GU) for rugby union clubs in the U.S. state of Georgia and other parts of the Southeastern United States. Founded in 1977 the GRU is part of USA Rugby. It is the governing body of rugby union in the state of Georgia.

Under the 2022-23 restructure the GRU is divided into three oversight sections: Senior Men, Senior Women (development), and Youth (development). Each section having individual elected directors. The union includes clubs from across Georgia and South Carolina.

Beginning in 2022 the GRU developed a men's state select side, the Georgia Barbarians. Players from any Georgia Rugby Union member club are eligible for selection. Also in 2022 the GRU announced plans for both women's, and youth Barbarians sides.

In recent years the GRU has developed very strong ties with the Georgian Rugby Union in the country of Georgia. GRU executives having been the invited guests of the Georgian Rugby Union for a match held between the USA Eagles and the Georgian national team in Tbilisi, Georgia, on August 19, 2023. Plans for player and tour exchanges between the GRU and Georgian Rugby Union have also been announced via GRU social media. The GRU Barbarians will tour the country of Georgia in early 2024 by invite of the Georgian Rugby Union, and the United States Embassy, Tbilisi.

== Related links ==
- Georgia Rugby Union Officials
- GRU member clubs
