= Auzoyah Alufohai =

American football player (born 1996)

Profile
- Position: Nose tackle

Personal information
- Born: October 16, 1996 (age 30); Houston, Texas, U.S.
- Listed height: 6 ft 4 in (1.93 m)
- Listed weight: 320 lb (145 kg)

Career information
- High school: Alpharetta (GA)
- College: Kennesaw State
- NFL draft: 2020: undrafted

Career history
- Houston Texans (2020); Chicago Bears (2021)*; Green Bay Packers (2021)*; Chicago Bears (2021–2022)*; Jacksonville Jaguars (2022)*; Philadelphia Stars (2024)*
- * Offseason or practice squad member only

Career NFL statistics
- Total tackles: 1
- Stats at Pro Football Reference

Auzoyah Alufohai (born October 16, 1996) is an American professional football nose tackle. After playing college football for the West Georgia Wolves, he signed with the Houston Texans as an undrafted free agent in 2020.

== Professional career ==
=== Houston Texans ===
Alufohai signed with the Houston Texans as an undrafted free agent following the 2020 NFL draft on April 27, 2020. He was waived during final roster cuts on September 5, 2020, and signed to the team's practice squad two days later. He was elevated to the active roster on December 19 for the team's week 15 game against the Indianapolis Colts, and reverted to the practice squad after the game. He was promoted to the active roster on December 23, 2020.

On August 24, 2021, Alufohai was waived by the Texans.

=== Chicago Bears ===
On September 1, 2021, Alufohai was signed to the Chicago Bears practice squad. He was released on September 8, 2021.

=== Green Bay Packers ===
On November 3, 2021, Alufohai was signed to the Green Bay Packers practice squad. He was released on November 16, 2021.

=== Chicago Bears (second stint) ===
On December 16, 2021, Alufohai was signed to the Bears practice squad. He signed a reserve/future contract with the Bears on January 11, 2022. He was waived on August 5, 2022.

=== Jacksonville Jaguars ===
On August 10, 2022, Alufohai signed with the Jacksonville Jaguars. He was waived on August 29, 2022.

=== Philadelphia Stars ===
Alufohai signed with the Philadelphia Stars of the United States Football League (USFL) on August 11, 2023. The Stars folded when the XFL and USFL merged to create the United Football League (UFL).
