= Cambridge High School (Georgia) =

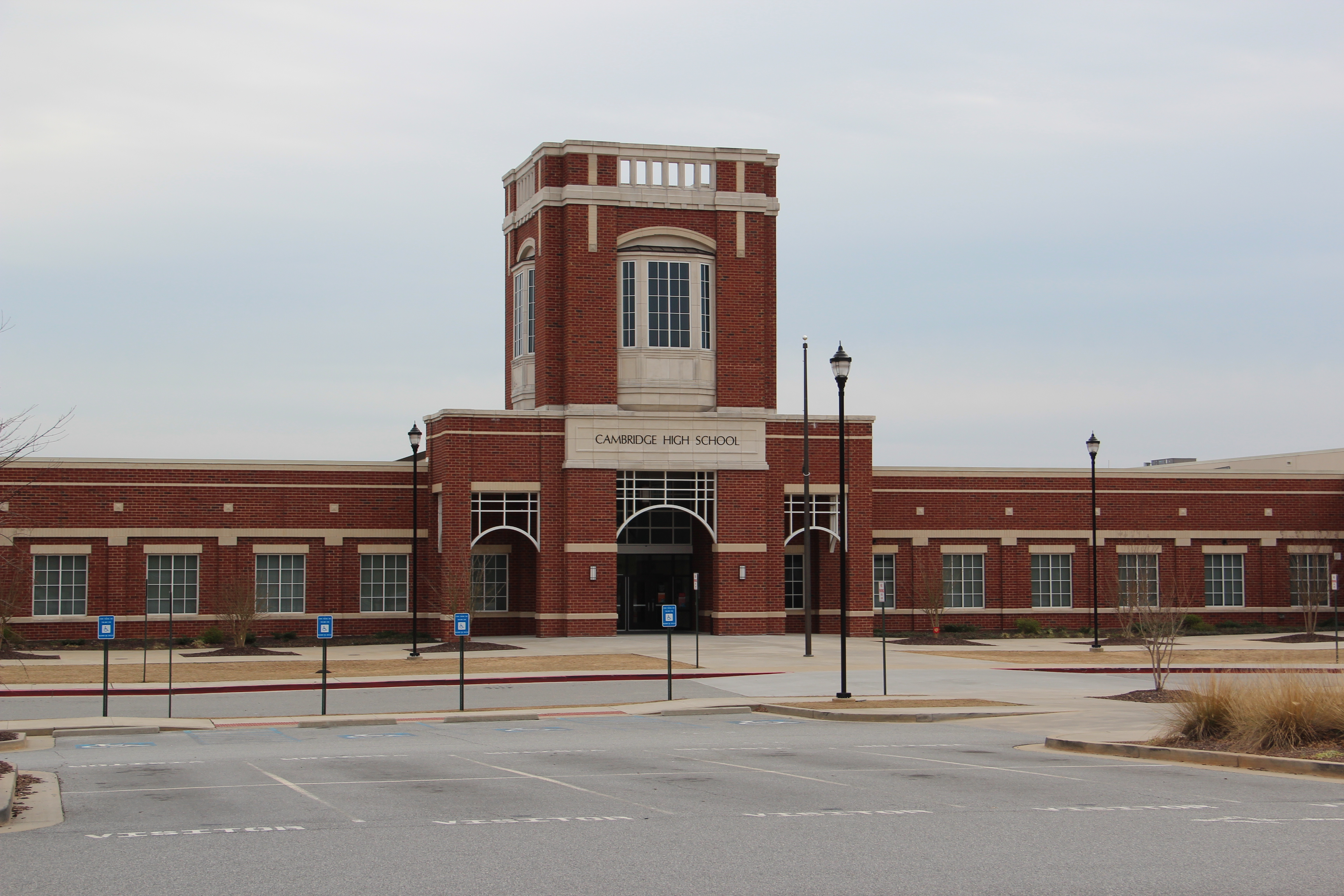

Location
- 2845 Bethany Bend, Milton, GA 30004; Milton, Fulton County, Georgia; United States; 34°07′06″N 84°16′31″W

Information
- Type: Public high school
- Established: August 2012
- Principal: Ms. Ashley Agans
- Teaching staff: 100.60 (FTE)
- Grades: 9–12
- Enrollment: 1,747 (2022-2023)
- Student to teacher ratio: 17.37
- Colours: Navy blue, Carolina blue, and white
- Athletics: Football, Softball, Baseball, Cross Country, Basketball, Soccer, Lacrosse, Swim and Dive, Track and Field, Wrestling, Riflery, Volleyball, Flag Football, Tennis, Gymnastics, and Golf
- Mascot: Bears
- Website: https://cambridge.fultonschools.org/

Cambridge High School is a public high school in Milton, Georgia and a school of the Fulton County School System.

The 17th high school to open in the district and relieving Alpharetta High School and Milton High School, it opened in August 2012.

== History ==
Cambridge High School first opened its doors for the 2012–13 school year. It opened to relieve overcrowding at Alpharetta High School and Milton High School. The letter C in the school's name is named for the Cogburn family, who previously owned the property the school sits on, the A and M are in honor of the students who moved over from Alpharetta and Milton High Schools, while the bridge part is named for a bridge on the school property. It was designed by CGLS Architects.

== Notable alumni ==
- John Hurst (2015) – Football player who played for the West Georgia Wolves
- Sabrina Long (2015) —Golfer who played for Yale University.
- Matthew Faby (2020) - Baseball player who played for the Barry Buccaneers
- Jake Peacock (2021) - Golfer on the PGA Tour
- Jordynn Dudley (2023) - Soccer player for the Florida State Seminoles
- Craig Dandridge (2026) – College football wide receiver for the Georgia Bulldogs
