= Fulton County School System =

School district in Georgia, United States

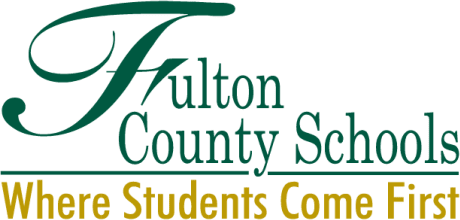

Address
- 6201 Powers Ferry Rd NW Atlanta, Georgia, 30339; United States
- Coordinates: 33.680131°N 84.364448°W

District information
- Motto: Where Students Come First
- Grades: Pre-kindergarten – 12
- Superintendent: Mike Looney
- Accreditations: Southern Association of Colleges and Schools; Georgia Accrediting Commission
- Budget: $1.638 billion
- NCES District ID: 1302280

Students and staff
- Enrollment: 88,043 (2023–24)
- Faculty: 6,120.10 (FTE)
- Staff: 6,472.90 (FTE)
- Student–teacher ratio: 14.39

Other information
- Telephone: (470) 254-3600
- Website: fultonschools.org

The Fulton County School System is a school district headquartered in Sandy Springs, Georgia, United States. The system serves the area of Fulton County outside the Atlanta city limits (which are served by Atlanta Public Schools). Fulton County Schools serve the cities of Alpharetta, Johns Creek, Milton, Mountain Park, Roswell, and Sandy Springs north of Atlanta, and Chattahoochee Hills, College Park, East Point, Fairburn, Hapeville, Palmetto, Union City, South Fulton, and Fulton's remaining unincorporated areas in the south. Fulton County is the fourth-largest school system in Georgia.

The Fulton County school district is the only non-contiguous school district in the state, having a 17-mile (27 km) separation (Atlanta Public Schools) between the north and south.

As of the 2012–2013 school year, Fulton has 11,500 full-time employees, including 7,500 teachers and other certified personnel, who work in 99 schools and 15 administrative and support buildings. Approximately 94,000 students attend classes in 58 elementary schools, 19 middle schools, 19 high schools, and seven charter schools.

Fulton County Schools is overseen by a seven-member board, all of whom are elected by geographic electoral district to four-year terms. Members of the Fulton County Board of Education are elected to four-year terms. Elections are held in even-numbered years. As of November 2026, the school members include: District 1 - Sara Gilliespie, District 2 - Lillie Pozatek, District 3 - Vacant, District 4 - Franchesca Warren, District 5 - Kristin McCabe, District 6 - Kimberly Dove, District 7 - Michelle Morancie.

== Territory ==
The district's territory spans about 90 miles (140 km).

== Operations ==
The district headquarters is in Sandy Springs. The district has another Sandy Springs office and one in Union City.

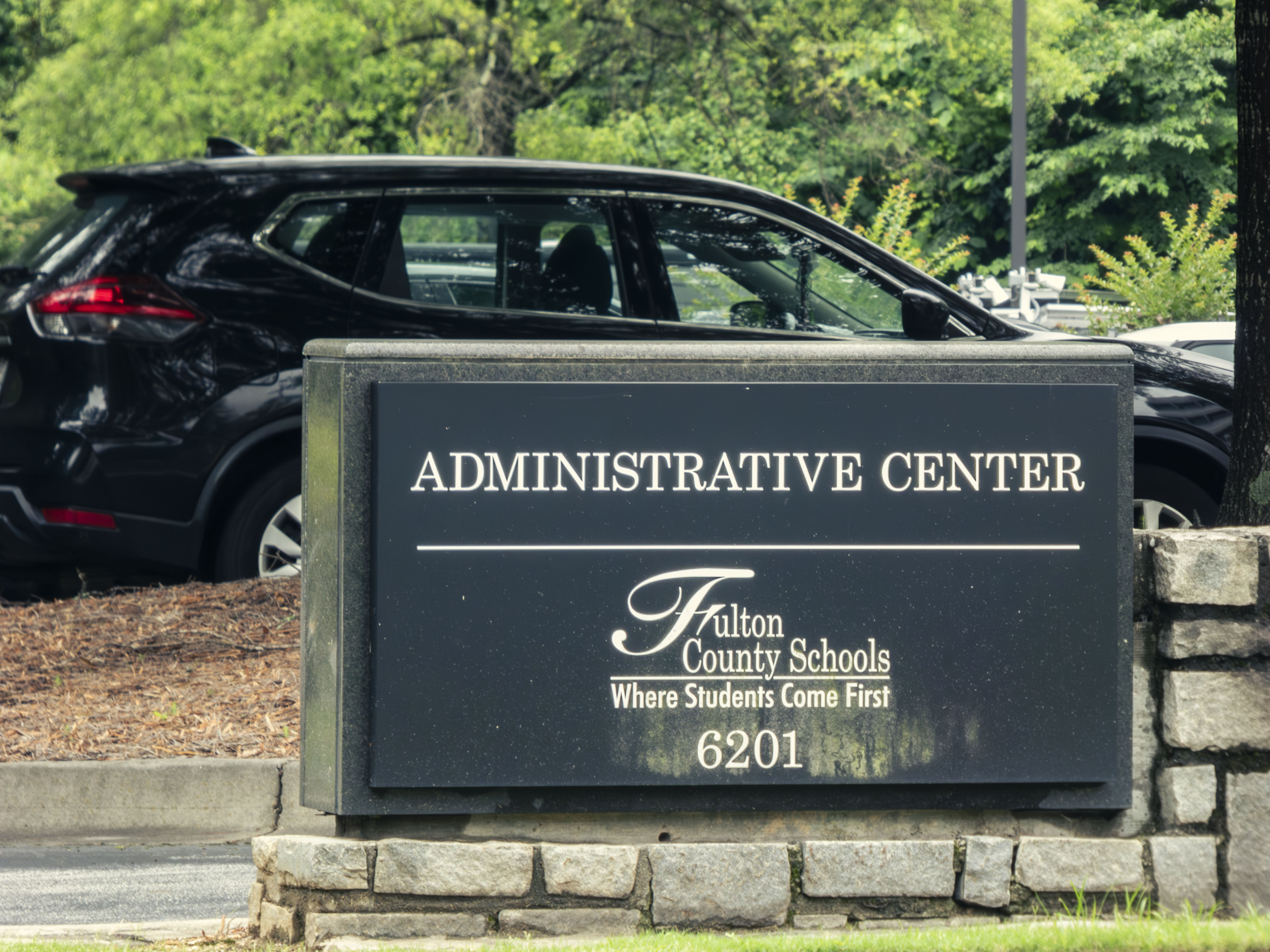
Fulton County School Administrative Center Sign

Previously the school district was headquartered in Atlanta. The district moved its headquarters in the period September 2014 through June 2015, citing how the majority of students live in the northern portions of the counties. The district maintains the Union City office for people living in the southern portion. Wayne Washington of The Atlanta Journal-Constitution wrote in 2013 that "There have long been complaints from some parents that the southern part of the [...] district has been neglected in favor of the faster-growing, more affluent northern part."

== Schools ==
=== Charter schools ===
- Amana Academy
- Chattahoochee Hills Charter School
- Fulton Academy of Science and Technology (FAST)
- Hapeville Career Academy
- KIPP South Fulton Academy
- Skyview High School
- The Main Street Academy
- International Charter School of Atlanta

=== Alpharetta Cluster ===
- Alpharetta High School
- Creek View Elementary School
- FCS Innovation Academy
- Lake Windward Elementary School
- Manning Oaks Elementary School
- New Prospect Elementary School
- Webb Bridge Middle School

=== Banneker Cluster ===
- Benjamin E. Banneker High School
- Heritage Elementary School
- S.L. Lewis Elementary School
- Ronald E. McNair Middle School
- Love T. Nolan Elementary School
- Feldwood Elementary School
- Woodland Middle School

=== Cambridge Cluster ===
- Cambridge High School
- Hopewell Middle School
- Northwestern Middle School
- Summit Hill Elementary School
- Manning Oaks Elementary School
- Cogburn Woods Elementary School
- Esther Jackson Elementary School (Alpharetta Elementary School) - Occupied a temporary site until 2016, when it received its current name and entered a new facility built on the site of the old one.
- Birmingham Falls Elementary School

=== Centennial Cluster ===
- Centennial High School
- Haynes Bridge Middle School
- Hillside Elementary School
- Holcomb Bridge Middle School
- Esther Jackson Elementary School
- Northwood Elementary School
- River Eves Elementary School
- Barnwell Elementary School (has students in Johns Creek cluster)

=== Chattahoochee Cluster ===
- Chattahoochee High School
- Abbotts Hill Elementary School
- Findley Oaks Elementary School
- Ocee Elementary School
- State Bridge Crossing Elementary School
- Taylor Road Middle School

=== Creekside Cluster ===
- Creekside High School
- Bear Creek Middle School
- Ronald E.McNair Middle School
- Oakley Elementary School
- Palmetto Elementary School
- Evoline C. West Elementary School

=== Johns Creek Cluster ===
- Johns Creek High School
- Autrey Mill Middle School
- Barnwell Elementary School (has students in Centennial cluster)
- Dolvin Elementary School
- Medlock Bridge Elementary School

=== Hughes Cluster ===
- Langston Hughes High School
- Campbell Elementary School
- Cliftondale Elementary School
- Gullatt Elementary School
- Liberty Point Elementary School
- Renaissance Elementary School
- Renaissance Middle School
- Sandtown Middle School
- Wolf Creek Elementary

=== Milton Cluster ===
- Milton High School
- Alpharetta Elementary School
- Birmingham Falls Elementary School
- Crabapple Crossing Elementary School
- Hopewell Middle School
- Northwestern Middle School
- Summit Hill Elementary School

=== North Springs Cluster ===
- North Springs High School
- Dunwoody Springs Elementary School
- Ison Springs Elementary School
- Sandy Springs Middle School
- Woodland Elementary School

=== Northview Cluster ===
- Northview High School
- Findley Oaks Elementary School
- River Trail Middle School
- Shakerag Elementary School
- Wilson Creek Elementary School

=== Riverwood Cluster ===
- Riverwood High School
- Heards Ferry Elementary School
- High Point Elementary School
- Lake Forest Elementary School
- Ridgeview Charter Middle School

=== Roswell Cluster ===
- Roswell High School
- Independence High School (Alternative School)
- Crabapple Middle School
- Crossroads Second Chance North (program)
- Elkins Pointe Middle School
- Hembree Springs Elementary School
- Mimosa Elementary School
- Mountain Park Elementary School
- Roswell North Elementary School
- Sweet Apple Elementary School

=== Tri-Cities Cluster ===
- Tri-Cities High School
- Brookview Elementary School
- College Park Elementary School
- Asa Grant Hilliard Elementary School
- Hamilton E. Holmes Elementary School
- Hapeville Elementary School
- Paul D. West Middle School
- Woodland Middle School

Hilliard Elementary, named after former East Point resident Asa Grant Hilliard III, opened in 2016 on the site of the former Mount Olive Elementary School, which opened in 1960. Mount Olive was replaced by Hilliard, with the former building razed in 2014. Mount Olive had a temporary site in 2014–2015 in East Point, with the new building and new name in effect in August 2015.

Oak Knoll Elementary School closed. Since 2015 it houses RISE Grammar School/RISE Prep School (which together serve K-8), which purchased the facility for $1.73 million in May 2018.

=== Westlake Cluster ===
- Westlake High School
- Camp Creek Middle School
- Seaborn Lee Elementary School
- A. Philip Randolph Elementary School
- Sandtown Middle School
- Stonewall Tell Elementary School

=== Other Schools ===
- FCS Innovation Academy (grade 9-12)
- Global Impact Academy (grade 9-12)
- The Promise Career Institute (grade 9-12)
