= Scottdale, Georgia =

- Unincorporated community Census-designated place
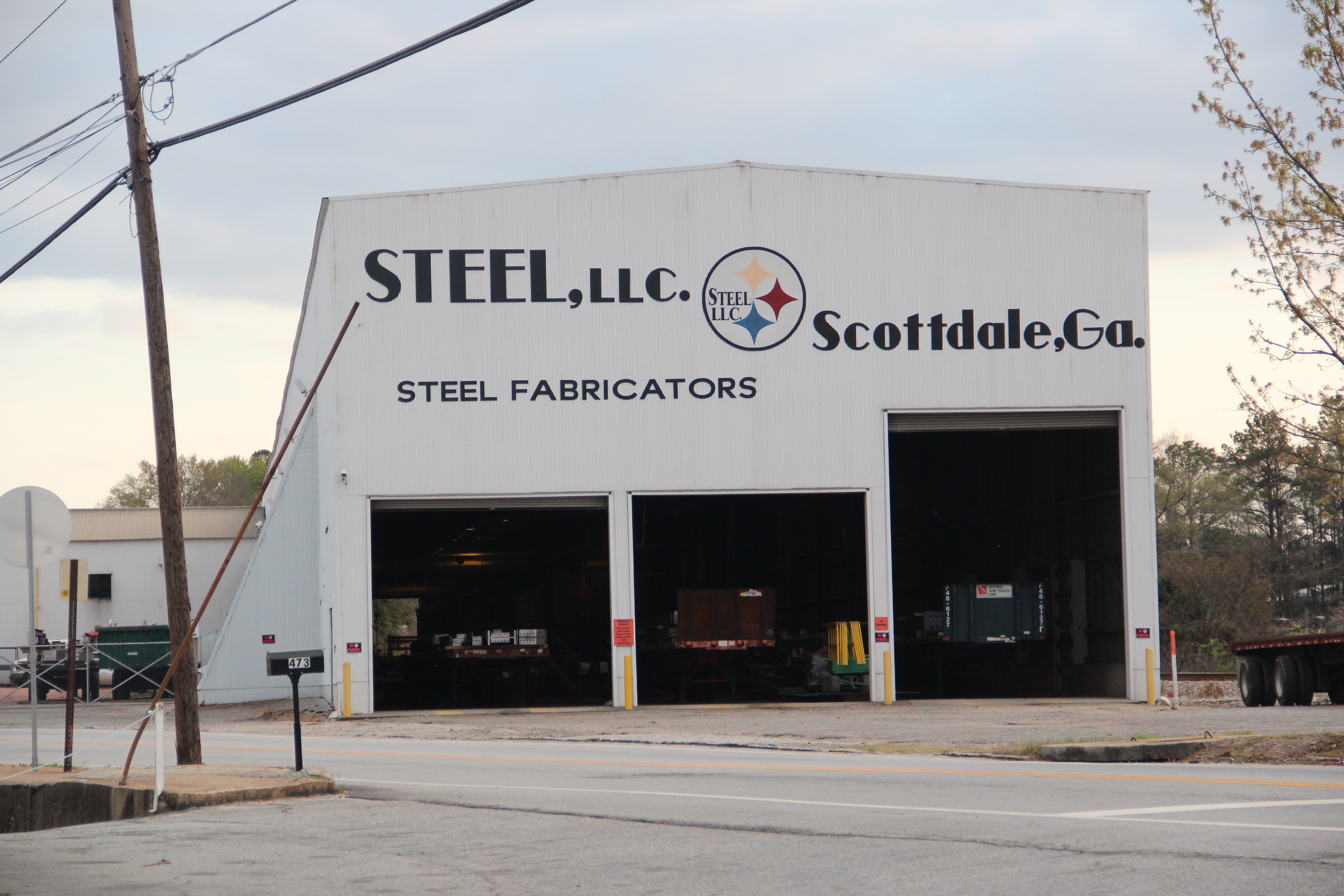
- Steel LLC fabrication facility in Scottdale

- Location in DeKalb County and the state of Georgia

- Location in Metro Atlanta
- Coordinates: 33°47′40″N 84°15′44″W
- Country: United States
- State: Georgia
- County: DeKalb

Area
  - Total: 3.34 sq mi (8.64 km^{2})
  - Land: 3.33 sq mi (8.62 km^{2})
  - Water: 0.0077 sq mi (0.02 km^{2})
- Elevation: 1,030 ft (314 m)

Population (2020)
  - Total: 10,698
  - Density: 3,215.5/sq mi (1,241.53/km^{2})
- Time zone: UTC-5 (Eastern (EST))
  - Summer (DST): UTC-4 (EDT)
- ZIP code: 30079
- Area code: 404
- FIPS code: 13-69392
- GNIS feature ID: 0332993

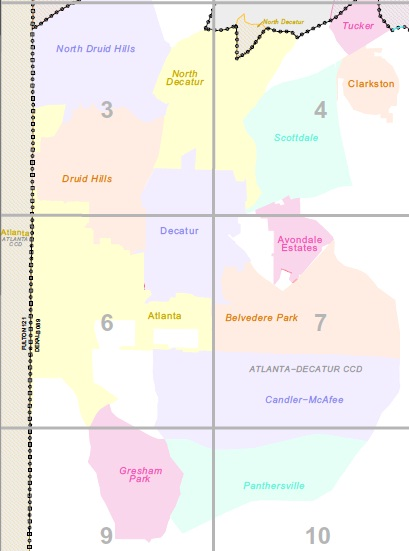
CDPs bordering eastern Atlanta (2001)

Scottdale is an unincorporated community and census-designated place (CDP) in DeKalb County, Georgia, United States. The population was 10,698 in 2020. Located approximately 7 miles east of Downtown Atlanta it is part of the city’s metropolitan area.

== History ==
Scottdale is named for Colonel George Washington Scott, who founded the Scottdale Cotton Mill in the late 1800s. Colonel Scott arrived in DeKalb County from Florida, where he had previously owned a plantation, served in the Confederate Army, and unsuccessfully run for governor. Col. Scott was also a benefactor of the female seminary that became Agnes Scott College.

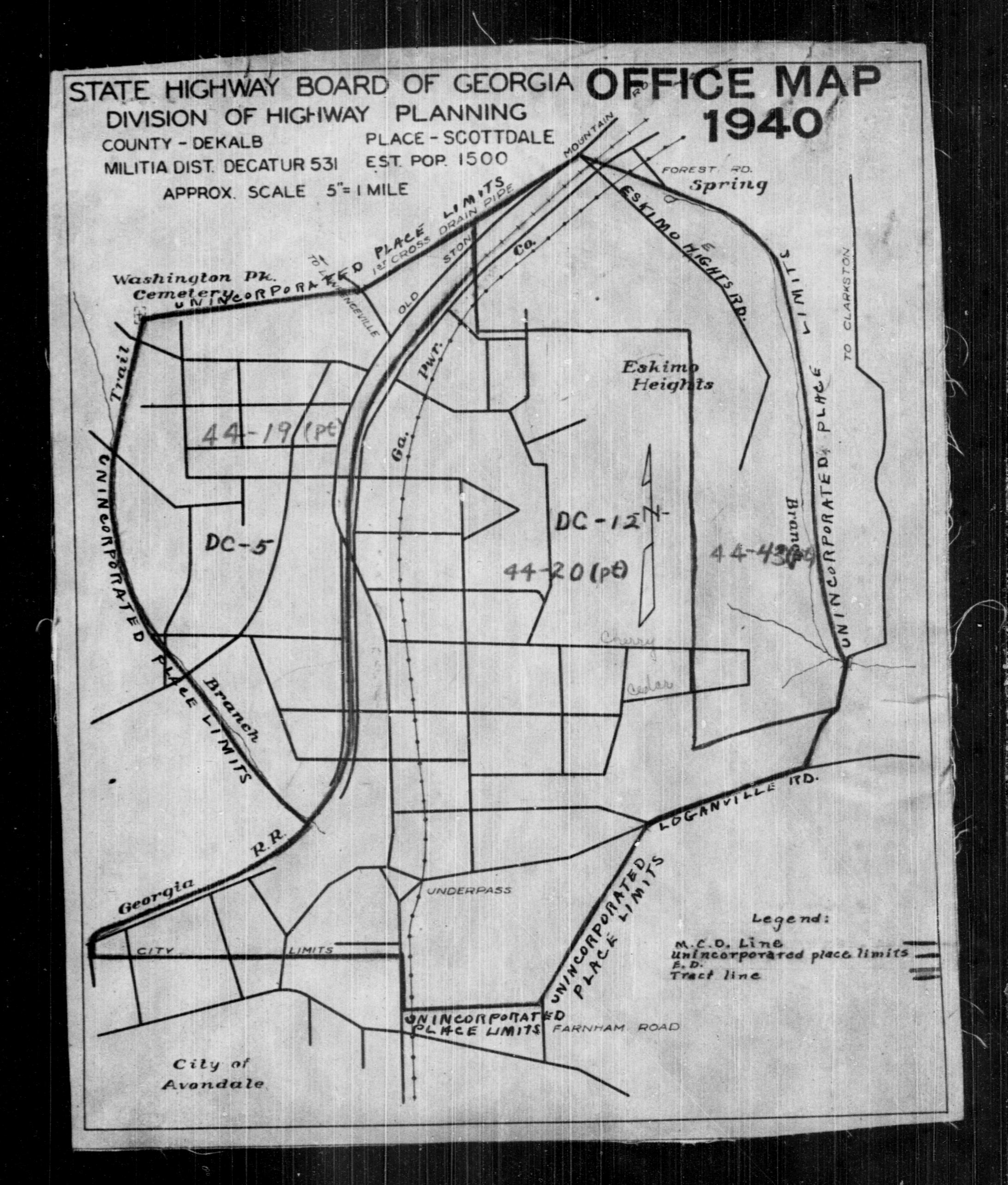
Highway Department map of Scottdale from 1940

The Scottdale Cotton Mill development included the mill and nearby housing for workers. From the 1920s through the 1940s, Scottdale Manufacturing Company even supported a baseball team. The mill shut down in 1982, and workers found jobs elsewhere in metro Atlanta. Philanthropist Tobie Grant donated several acres of property to disenfranchised, unemployed African-Americans and created a community known as Tobie Grant. Oak Forest Apartments was also opened under this theme in 1968.

The commercial district in Scottdale is focused on East Ponce de Leon Avenue, which bisects the community from the southwest to the northeast. Your DeKalb Farmers Market and antique shops are located on this road, along with several auto body shops and industrial buildings. Steel LLC maintains a large steel fabrication and distribution facility in Scottdale, near the intersection of North Clarendon Avenue and East Ponce de Leon Avenue. Efforts to rehabilitate East Ponce de Leon Avenue commenced in 2007.

== Geography ==
Scottdale is located at 33°47′40″N 84°15′44″W (33.794337, -84.262110). The unincorporated community is centered on East Ponce de Leon Avenue, between Decatur and Clarkston. The northern boundary is Stone Mountain Freeway; the eastern boundary is Interstate 285; the western boundary is roughly DeKalb Industrial Way; and the southern boundary is roughly the city limits of Avondale Estates. The ZIP code for Scottdale is 30079.

According to the United States Census Bureau, the CDP has a total area of 3.5 square miles (9.1 km^{2}), all land.

== Demographics ==
Historical population
Census	Pop.	Note	%±
1980	8,770		—
1990	8,636		−1.5%
2000	9,803		13.5%
2010	10,631		8.4%
2020	10,698		0.6%
U.S. Decennial Census; 1850-1870 1870-1880; 1890-1910 1920-1930; 1940 1950 1960; 1970 1980 1990; 2000 2010 2020

Scottdale was first listed as a census designated place in the 1980 U.S. census.

=== Racial and ethnic composition ===
Scottdale CDP, Georgia – Racial and ethnic composition Note: the US Census treats Hispanic/Latino as an ethnic category. This table excludes Latinos from the racial categories and assigns them to a separate category. Hispanics/Latinos may be of any race.
Race / Ethnicity (NH = Non-Hispanic)	Pop 2000	Pop 2010	Pop 2020	% 2000	% 2010	% 2020
White alone (NH)	3,427	3,178	3,552	34.96%	29.89%	33.20%
Black or African American alone (NH)	4,731	4,009	3,908	48.26%	37.71%	36.53%
Native American or Alaska Native alone (NH)	17	21	37	0.17%	0.20%	0.35%
Asian alone (NH)	933	2,448	1,902	9.52%	23.03%	17.78%
Pacific Islander alone (NH)	12	1	0	0.12%	0.01%	0.00%
Other race alone (NH)	32	53	60	0.33%	0.50%	0.56%
Mixed race or Multiracial (NH)	207	357	459	2.11%	3.36%	4.29%
Hispanic or Latino (any race)	444	564	780	4.53%	5.31%	7.29%
Total	9,803	10,631	10,698	100.00%	100.00%	100.00%

=== 2020 census ===
As of the 2020 census, Scottdale had a population of 10,698. The median age was 35.1 years. 20.3% of residents were under the age of 18 and 10.2% of residents were 65 years of age or older. For every 100 females there were 88.2 males, and for every 100 females age 18 and over there were 84.7 males age 18 and over.

100.0% of residents lived in urban areas, while 0.0% lived in rural areas.

There were 4,775 households in Scottdale, of which 26.2% had children under the age of 18 living in them. Of all households, 31.8% were married-couple households, 23.4% were households with a male householder and no spouse or partner present, and 36.7% were households with a female householder and no spouse or partner present. About 33.9% of all households were made up of individuals and 9.0% had someone living alone who was 65 years of age or older. There were 2,277 families residing in the CDP.

There were 5,132 housing units, of which 7.0% were vacant. The homeowner vacancy rate was 1.7% and the rental vacancy rate was 5.5%.

== Education ==
DeKalb County School District is the area school district.

Zoned elementary schools: McLendon Elementary School and Avondale Elementary School The zoned middle school is Druid Hills Middle School, and the zoned high school is Druid Hills High School near Decatur.

Magnet schools:

- Robert Shaw Theme Elementary School, 385 Glendale Rd. DeKalb County Elementary School.

Former schools:

- Hamilton High School (Scottdale, Georgia) and Robert Shaw Elementary School, DeKalb County, closed 1969
- Avondale High School at 1192 Clarendon Avenue, closed in 2011 and was converted to a Performance Arts only campus: DeKalb School of the Arts.
- Avondale Middle School, 3131 Old Rockbridge Rd. - Closed in 2011

== Parks & recreation ==
- Cedar Park, 3165 Cedar St. Three acre DeKalb County park with a multi-use field, basketball court, multi-use court, playground and picnic area.
- Hamilton Recreation Center & Park, 3262 Chapel St. Eight acre DeKalb County park with a softball field, football field, a multi-use field, recreation center and playground.
- Needham Park, McLendon Dr. & East Ponce de Leon Ave. Greenspace park.

Tobie Grant Park, Pool & Recreation Center
