= Belvedere Park, Georgia =

- Unincorporated community Census-designated place
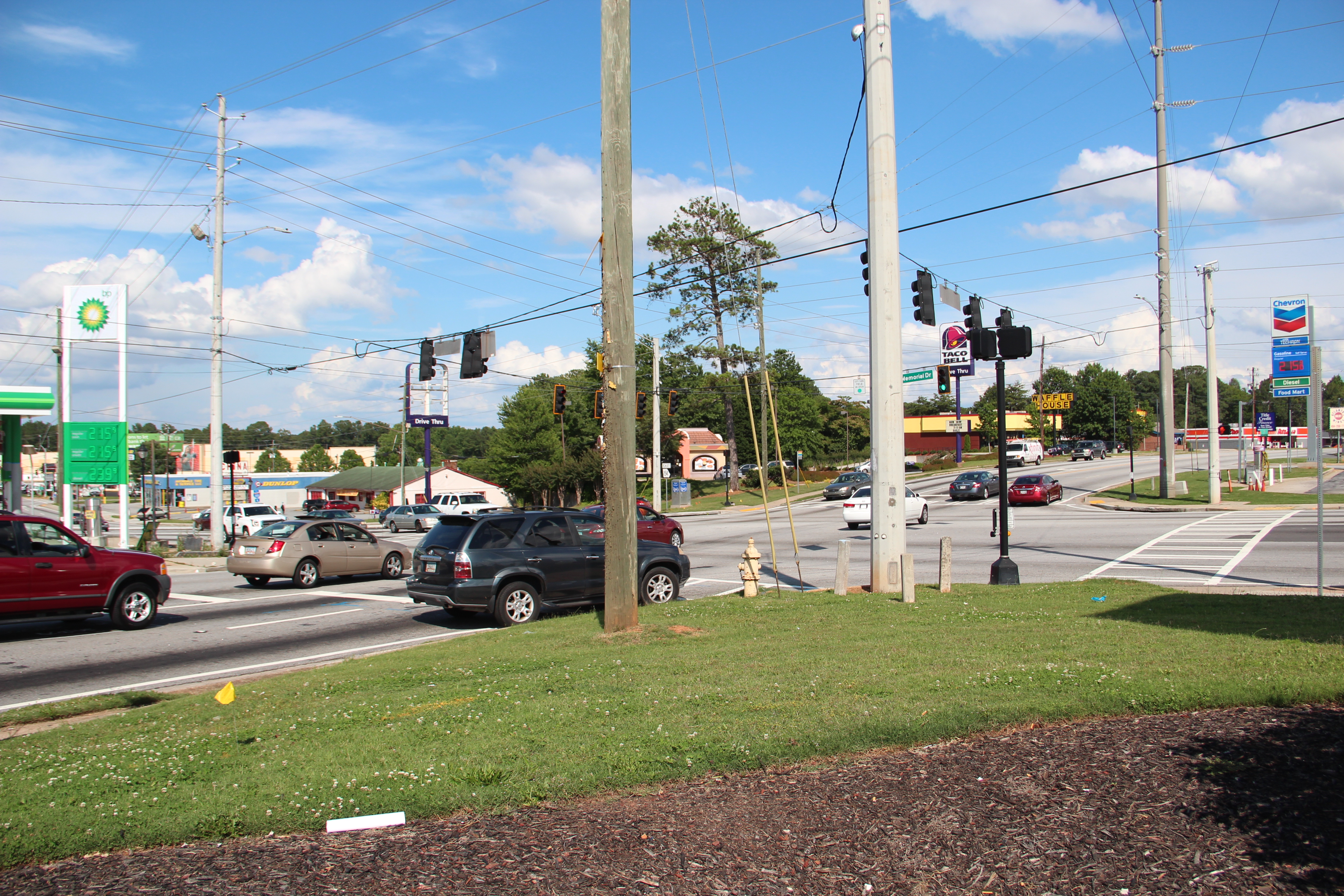
- Intersection in Belvedere Park, Georgia

- Location in DeKalb County and the state of Georgia

- Location in Metro Atlanta
- Coordinates: 33°44′56″N 84°15′35″W
- Country: United States
- State: Georgia
- County: DeKalb

Area
  - Total: 4.90 sq mi (12.69 km^{2})
  - Land: 4.90 sq mi (12.68 km^{2})
  - Water: 0.0039 sq mi (0.01 km^{2})
- Elevation: 997 ft (304 m)

Population (2020)
  - Total: 15,113
  - Density: 3,085.8/sq mi (1,191.44/km^{2})
- Time zone: UTC-5 (Eastern (EST))
  - Summer (DST): UTC-4 (EDT)
- FIPS code: 13-06884
- GNIS feature ID: 0331129

Belvedere Park is an unincorporated community and census-designated place (CDP) in DeKalb County, Georgia, United States. The population was 15,113 at the 2020 census.

== Geography ==
Belvedere Park is located at 33°44′56″N 84°15′35″W (33.748855, -84.259617). It is bordered by:

- the Atlanta neighborhood of East Lake to the west
- the cities of Avondale Estates and Decatur to the north
- the Candler-McAfee CDP to the south

According to the United States Census Bureau, Belvedere Park has a total area of 5.0 square miles (13 km^{2}), all land.

== History ==
Belvedere Park emerged beginning in 1952 as a planned community with schools, parks, and a shopping center. It continued to grow and expand throughout the decade.

=== Housing tracts ===
In 1958, the Atlanta Journal advertised houses in Belvedere Park for between $11,000 and $14,800. One ad proclaimed:

“Buy a Home in Belvedere Park with a 100% GI Loan - A Complete Established Community of Distinction and Quality Convenient to Everything.”

A majority of homes in Belvedere Park are one-story and while some are traditional red brick ranch homes, contemporary style houses were also built. Homes were built by the Embry Brothers. Adair Realty and Loan, a powerful real estate company in Atlanta during the early to mid 20th century, represented Belvedere Park.

=== Belvedere Motel ===
The Belvedere Motel, operated by the renowned Dinkler Hotel Corporation, opened with telephones and large screen televisions in every room. The motel claimed to be “dedicated to your traveling comfort” — additional amenities included a playground and a shuffleboard court.

=== Opening of Rich's ===
In 1959, the second branch of Rich's Department Store was opened in the Belvedere Shopping Center (the first branch was opened at Lenox Square Mall). Rich's added an air of metropolitan living to the suburbs.

In 1963, Towers High School was opened and is still in operation today. Midway Park on Midway Road is a popular recreational center. It has several fields for baseball and football and a public swimming pool.

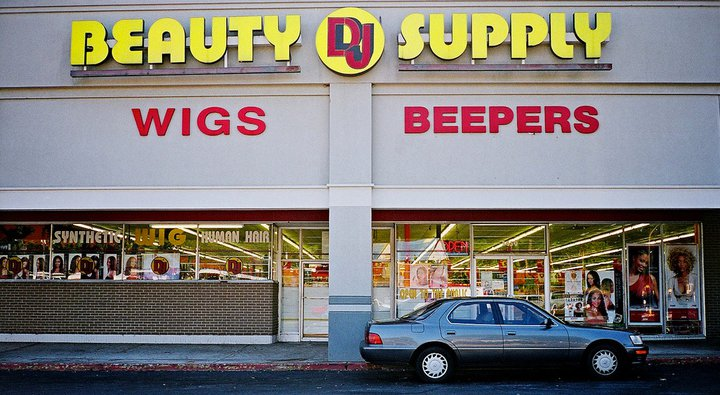
Former wig and beeper store in Belvedere Plaza

== Demographics ==
Historical population
| Census | Pop. | Note | %± |
|---|---|---|---|
| 1980 | 17,766 | | — |
| 1990 | 18,089 | | 1.8% |
| 2000 | 18,945 | | 4.7% |
| 2010 | 15,152 | | −20.0% |
| 2020 | 15,113 | | −0.3% |
U.S. Decennial Census; 1850-1870 1870-1880; 1890-1910 1920-1930; 1940 1950 1960; 1970 1980 1990; 2000 2010 2020

Belvedere Park first appeared as a census designated place in the 1980 U.S. census.

=== Racial and ethnic composition ===
Belvedere Park, Georgia – Racial and ethnic composition Note: the US Census treats Hispanic/Latino as an ethnic category. This table excludes Latinos from the racial categories and assigns them to a separate category. Hispanics/Latinos may be of any race.
| Race / Ethnicity (NH = Non-Hispanic) | Pop 2000 | Pop 2010 | Pop 2020 | % 2000 | % 2010 | % 2020 |
|---|---|---|---|---|---|---|
| White alone (NH) | 2,286 | 2,744 | 4,072 | 12.07% | 18.11% | 26.94% |
| Black or African American alone (NH) | 15,542 | 11,454 | 9,309 | 82.04% | 75.59% | 61.60% |
| Native American or Alaska Native alone (NH) | 25 | 36 | 24 | 0.13% | 0.24% | 0.16% |
| Asian alone (NH) | 173 | 120 | 217 | 0.91% | 0.79% | 1.44% |
| Native Hawaiian or Pacific Islander alone (NH) | 4 | 3 | 7 | 0.02% | 0.02% | 0.05% |
| Other race alone (NH) | 28 | 32 | 85 | 0.15% | 0.21% | 0.56% |
| Mixed race or Multiracial (NH) | 227 | 240 | 619 | 1.20% | 1.58% | 4.10% |
| Hispanic or Latino (any race) | 660 | 523 | 780 | 3.48% | 3.45% | 5.16% |
| Total | 18,945 | 15,152 | 15,113 | 100.00% | 100.00% | 100.00% |

=== 2020 census ===
As of the 2020 census, Belvedere Park had a population of 15,113. The median age was 37.3 years. 18.5% of residents were under the age of 18 and 13.7% of residents were 65 years of age or older. For every 100 females there were 88.6 males, and for every 100 females age 18 and over there were 85.4 males age 18 and over.

100.0% of residents lived in urban areas, while 0.0% lived in rural areas.

There were 6,407 households in Belvedere Park, of which 23.3% had children under the age of 18 living in them. Of all households, 27.5% were married-couple households, 22.5% were households with a male householder and no spouse or partner present, and 40.4% were households with a female householder and no spouse or partner present. About 32.6% of all households were made up of individuals and 9.7% had someone living alone who was 65 years of age or older. There were 3,251 families residing in the CDP.

There were 7,116 housing units, of which 10.0% were vacant. The homeowner vacancy rate was 3.6% and the rental vacancy rate was 9.2%.

== Education ==
It is within the DeKalb County School District.

- Elementary schools: Peachcrest (in the CDP) and Snapfinger (outside of the CDP)
- Middle schools: Mary McLeod Bethune and Columbia (both outside of the CDP)
- High schools: Towers High School (in the CDP) and Columbia High School (outside of the CDP).

== Economy ==
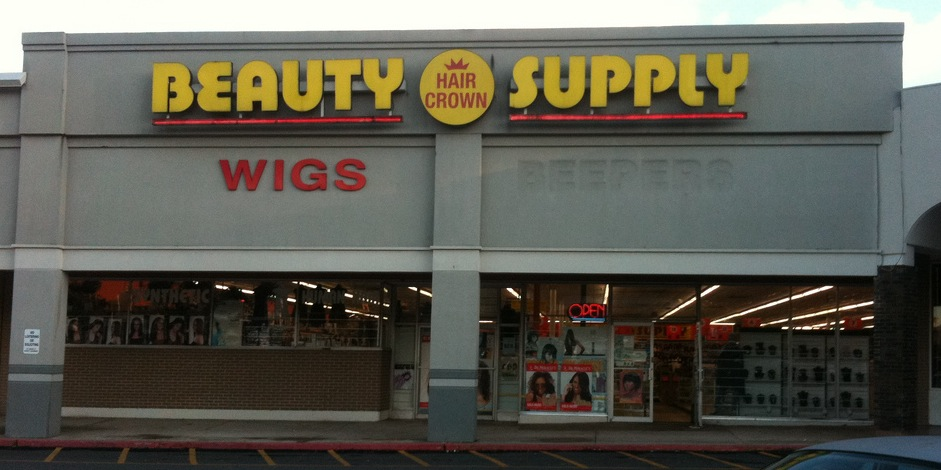
Wig store at Belvedere Plaza, circa 2011

The community's economy contains Belvedere Plaza, which had the second suburban Rich's department store (after Lenox Square in Atlanta), currently a market for Afro-centric sales products.

== Recent Development ==
Some MARTA transit initiatives in the area include the South Dekalb Transit Initiative and the Candler Rd ART. As of May 2025, the South Dekalb Transit Initiative is in the design phase and is anticipated to complete January 2029. The purpose of this project is to conduct an Alternatives Analysis in the South Dekalb/I-20 East corridor to explore a full range of high-capacity transit (HCT) alternatives (i.e., alignments, modes, stations, and operating plans). Critical to the success of this process is ongoing engagement and partnership with Georgia Department of Transportation (GDOT) and Dekalb County to develop a multimodal design solution with a path forward for implementation and buy-in from the community. As of May 2025, the Candler Rd ART is in the planning phase and is anticipated to complete January 2029. The purpose of this project is to start new Arterial Rapid Transit (ART) service on Candler Road between Avondale Station and the Georgia State University Panthersville campus. ART service will deliver more frequent service and improved amenities along this high-ridership corridor.

Grand Terraza at Memorial Drive is a planned development of townhomes surrounding greenspace located at 3265 Memorial Dr, announced in 2020 by local developer Valor Tower Real Estate Developments. As of 2024, four years after this announcement and two years since the land had been cleared, there are no obvious signs of construction.
