= Robert O'Neal (American football) =

American football player (born 1971)

No. 32, 27
- Position: Cornerback

Personal information
- Born: February 1, 1971 (age 55); Atlanta, Georgia, U.S.
- Listed height: 6 ft 1 in (1.85 m)
- Listed weight: 199 lb (90 kg)

Career information
- High school: Clarkston (GA)
- College: Clemson
- NFL draft: 1993: 6th round, 164th overall pick

Career history
- Miami Dolphins (1993)*; Indianapolis Colts (1993–1994); Amsterdam Admirals (1995-1997)
- * Offseason or practice squad member only

Awards and highlights
- 2× First-team All-ACC (1989, 1991); Second-team All-ACC (1992)

Career NFL statistics
- Games played: 2
- Stats at Pro Football Reference

Robert Oliver O'Neal (born February 1, 1971) is an American former professional football player who was a cornerback for one season with the Indianapolis Colts of the National Football League (NFL). He played college football for the Clemson Tigers. O'Neal played in NFL Europe for the Amsterdam Admirals.

== Early life ==
Robert O'Neal was born on February 1, 1971, in Atlanta, Georgia. He went to high school at Clarkston (GA).

== College career ==
O'Neal played college football for the Clemson Tigers. In his freshmen year he set a school record with eight interceptions. He was named All-ACC three times.

=== College awards and honors ===
- 3x All-ACC (1989, 1991, 1992)

== Professional career ==
Pre-draft measurables
Height	Weight	Arm length	Hand span	40-yard dash	10-yard split	20-yard split	Vertical jump	Broad jump	Bench press
6 ft 0.9 in (1.85 m)	194 lb (88 kg)	33 in (0.84 m)	9 in (0.23 m)	4.68 s	1.66 s	2.74 s	35.5 in (0.90 m)	10 ft 3 in (3.12 m)	13 reps
All values from NFL Scouting Combine

Miami Dolphins

O'Neal was selected in the sixth round (164) by the Miami Dolphins in the 1993 NFL draft. But he did not play for them.

Indianapolis Colts

In 1994 he played two games for the Indianapolis Colts.

Amsterdam Admirals

In 1995 he played in NFL Europe for the Amsterdam Admirals. He had one interception in 1995. He remained there until 1997. After 1997 he did not play anymore.
