= Clarkston High School =

Clarkston High School may refer to:

- Clarkston High School (Georgia), near Clarkston, Georgia
- Clarkston High School (Michigan), Independence Township, Michigan
- Clarkston High School (Washington), Clarkston, Washington
