= AASD =

AASD may refer to:

== Schools ==
- Altoona Area School District, a public school district in Pennsylvania, US
- Ambridge Area School District, a school district in Pennsylvania, US
- Appleton Area School District, a school district in Wisconsin, US
- Atlanta Area School for the Deaf, a school for the deaf in Georgia, US

== Other uses ==
- Afrikan Alliance of Social Democrats, a South African political party
- Applied Agile Software Development, a software development method
