= Hamilton High School (Scottdale, Georgia) =

Former school in Scottdale, Georgia, U.S.

Coordinates: 33.7871°N 84.2558°W

Hamilton High School is a former school in Scottdale, Georgia that served African American students in Dekalb County, Georgia. It opened as Avondale Colored School, an elementary school, in 1924. It expanded to include a high school and was also known as Avondale Elementary and High School. It eventually closed after desegregation in 1969.

The school was renamed Hamilton High School for the school's former principal, Maud Hamilton. The class of 1963 held a 50th reunion in 2013. A historical marker for the school was planned.

== History ==
It opened as a Rosenwald school in 1924 succeeding a church school for African Americans. A photograph of the school and its students is included in the book African-American Life in Dekalb County 1823-1970 by Herman “Skip” Mason Jr.

The school was built with funds from Julius Rosenwald (Rosenwald School). William Hatton served as the school's principal. Hatton Drive in Scottdale is named for him. Robert Shaw donated land for the school. Robert Shaw Elementary School and Robert Shaw Theme Elementary School were named for him.

In 1942, running water, a science lab, new piano, library, and telelphone were added.

Hamilton High School and Robert Shaw Elementary School were built across from each other in 1955.

According to a proclamation read at a DeKalb County Commissioners hearing in 2013, the school was the first to be named after an African-American in DeKalb County.

== See also ==
- DeKalb County School District
- Avondale High School
