= Briarcliff High School (DeKalb County, Georgia) =

Coordinates: 33.82537°N 84.32594°W

- Atlanta, Georgia; United States

Information
- Type: Public
- Established: 1958
- Closed: 1987
- Campus: Suburban — DeKalb County
- Colors: Silver and Blue
- Mascot: Barons

Briarcliff High School was a public high school opened by the DeKalb County School System in 1958 in order to relieve overcrowding at Druid Hills High School. Throughout the history of the school, Druid Hills was viewed as its "arch rival," and, with the closing of Briarcliff in 1987, the remaining students, and all the trophies, and other relics of the history of the school other than the buildings transferred to Druid Hills, where they remain today.

The first classes were held in what was known only as "B" Hall (the front section of the school), and its only students were in the 8th and 9th grades. In the 1961-1962 school year, the school building existed much as it does today, without the temporary buildings.

In 1961, playing on the field at the newly constructed Adams Memorial Stadium, Briarcliff won only three football games, but, significantly, defeated Druid Hills 13-0.

On June 12, 1962, the first class graduated at commencement exercises held next to the school at Adams Memorial Stadium. The first three "honor" graduates of Briarcliff, James M. "Jim" Veazey, Sharon L. Sullivan and James E. "Jimmy" Massey, spoke respectively of the past, present future of Briarcliff and its students. Veazey was officially identified as the first person to graduate from Briarcliff by the Briarcliff yearbook which is titled "The Shield."

The school's colors were silver and blue, and its mascot was the Baron.

The DeKalb County School System closed Briarcliff at the end of the 1986-1987 school year, due to a population shift. In 1986, when Superintendent Robert Freeman recommended that the school be closed, he projected that in the 1987-1988 school year, there would be only about 500 students enrolled in the whole school, with around 40 students in the 8th grade. At its height, in the mid-1960s, the graduating classes routinely numbered around 500.

In August 1987, all former Briarcliff students began attending Druid Hills High School. The DeKalb School of the Arts and Open Campus High School operated in Briarcliff's buildings until 2009, when DSA moved back onto Avondale High School's campus and Open Campus moved to the new county office campus in Stone Mountain, Georgia.

Adams Memorial Stadium remains a site for high school games during the football season.

In 2006, a major Florida developer, Sembler Co., offered to purchase the 39 acres (160,000 m^{2}) along North Druid Hills Road which included the land and buildings on which Briarcliff, Adams Memorial Stadium and Kittredge Elementary School sat, in order to build a large mixed-use development, similar to others in the Atlanta area during the last decade. The Board of Education valued Sembler's offer at more than $60 million, which would be paid in the form of a land-swap and the construction of new buildings for all of the displaced schools. The recession in the construction industry beginning in 2008 and local residents' protests ended Sembler's plans.

In the first two seasons of MTV's Teen Wolf series, the buildings and property of Briarcliff High School were used in numerous episodes. Briarcliff was used before Palisades Charter High School near Los Angeles.

In 2018, plans to build a new Cross Keys High School on the site gained popularity. Construction was slated for 2019.

== Notable alumni ==
- Peter Linz, puppeteer
- Ron Welch, professional wrestler
- David Nahmias, Chief Justice of the Supreme Court of Georgia
