= John Eldred Swearingen =

John Eldred Swearingen (January 9, 1875 – September 24, 1957) was an American educator and public official.

== Early life and education ==
Born in Trenton, South Carolina, Swearingen lost his sight in a hunting accident in 1888. He later attended the Georgia Academy for the Blind and Cedar Spring School for the Blind and Deaf before graduating from South Carolina College in 1899, where he was recognized as a leading scholar of the Clariosophic Literary Society.

== Career ==
Swearingen began his educational career at Cedar Spring, serving as a teacher and principal from 1899 to 1908. In 1908, he was elected South Carolina Superintendent of Education and held that position for 14 years. During his tenure, he introduced reforms that increased financial support for school districts, established local school tax laws, and implemented state-mandated curricula and teacher certifications. He also administered the Smith–Hughes Act, which expanded vocational education opportunities.

Working within a segregated system, Swearingen supported efforts to provide education for African Americans. He worked with organizations to improve school facilities and initiated night schools aimed at reducing adult illiteracy. In addition, he co-founded the South Carolina Association for the Blind, promoting education and training for visually impaired individuals.

Following an unsuccessful re-election campaign in 1922, Swearingen retired from public office and turned to farming and lumbering. He died in Columbia, South Carolina, in 1957.
