= Danny Buggs =

American football player (born 1953)

No. 86, 88
- Position: Wide receiver

Personal information
- Born: April 22, 1953 (age 73); Duluth, Georgia, U.S.
- Listed height: 6 ft 2 in (1.88 m)
- Listed weight: 185 lb (84 kg)

Career information
- High school: Avondale (Avondale Estates, Georgia)
- College: West Virginia
- NFL draft: 1975: 3rd round, 62nd overall pick

Career history
- New York Giants (1975–1976); Washington Redskins (1976–1979); Tampa Bay Buccaneers (1980)*; Edmonton Eskimos (1980); Houston Oilers (1981)*; Montreal Alouettes/Concordes (1982)*; Tampa Bay Bandits (1983); San Antonio Gunslingers (1984–1985)
- * Offseason or practice squad member only

Awards and highlights
- Grey Cup champion (1980); First-team All-American (1973); First-team All-East (1973); Second-team All-East (1972)

Career NFL statistics
- Receptions: 110
- Receiving Yards: 1,572
- Receiving TDs: 4
- Stats at Pro Football Reference

Daniel Buggs (born April 22, 1953) is an American former professional football player who was a wide receiver for the New York Giants and Washington Redskins of the National Football League (NFL), the Edmonton Eskimos of the Canadian Football League (CFL), and the Tampa Bay Bandits and San Antonio Gunslingers of the United States Football League (USFL).

== Early life and college ==
Buggs was a star at football powerhouse Avondale High School in Avondale Estates, Georgia.

After sitting out a year in 1971, forced to for academic reasons by coach Bobby Bowden, and rejecting offers from Arizona State, Clemson and Florida State, Buggs made an immediate impact in 1972. He scored a whopping 84 points, including punt returns, and also averaged a touchdown every five times he touched the ball.

Buggs was a 1973 Kodak first-team All-American from West Virginia University, who owns the longest catch from scrimmage in West Virginia school history against Penn State in 1973 for 96 yards and a touchdown. He was also the first Mountaineer to post back-to-back 100 yard receiving games. In 1974, he was selected to play in the Hula Bowl and the Senior Bowl, helping the East top the West with a touchdown in the Hula Bowl.

He ranks fourth in career receiving yards with 1,796 and touchdown receptions with 15 and holds the West Virginia record for most career yards per reception with a 20.9 average. He is often considered one of the greatest receivers in West Virginia University football history, along with greats such as Reggie Rembert, Jerry Porter, Chris Henry, and David Sills.

== Professional career ==
=== NFL ===
Buggs was selected by the New York Giants in the third round of the 1975 NFL draft. He played two seasons in New York, 1975 and 1976.

The Giants cut Buggs partway through the 1976 season, and the Washington Redskins signed him. In his six games with the Redskins in 1976, he caught two passes for 25 yards. The next season, 1977 he had 26 receptions for 341 yards and a touchdown.

With the NFL's then-all-time leading receiver, Charley Taylor, retired following the 1977 season after playing for the Redskins for 14 seasons, Buggs broke out in 1978 with 36 receptions for 575 yards and two touchdowns. In his final NFL season, 1979, Buggs totaled 46 receptions for 631 yards and a touchdown while playing all 16 games for the first time in his career.

On April 29, 1980, Buggs was traded along with a fourth round pick (Larry Flowers) in the 1980 NFL draft by the Washington Redskins to the Tampa Bay Buccaneers in exchange for cornerback Jeris White. Buggs was traded to make room for the Redskins' first round selection, future Hall of Famer Art Monk, the first time Washington did not trade its first round pick since 1968. He attended the Buccaneers' training camp, but was cut on September 1, 1980.

On June 23, 1981, Buggs signed with the Houston Oilers and he was with the team until August 25, 1981.

=== CFL and USFL ===
Buggs played in the CFL from 1980 to 1982. In 1980, he helped the Edmonton Eskimos, led by quarterback Warren Moon, win the Grey Cup, which is the CFL's championship game. On April 20, 1982, he was signed by the Montreal Alouettes. Shortly after he signed the Alouettes folded and the franchise became the Montreal Concordes. The Concordes later released him on July 4, 1982.

Buggs played for the USFL's Tampa Bay Bandits in 1983, and the San Antonio Gunslingers in 1984 and 1985.
