= Sequoyah Middle School =

Sequoyah Middle School can refer to:

- Sequoyah Middle School (Clayton County, Georgia)
- Sequoyah Middle School (Doraville, Georgia)
- Sequoyah Middle School (Oklahoma)
- Sequoyah Middle School (Washington)
