= Laurel Ridge Elementary School =

Laurel Ridge Elementary School may refer to:

- Laurel Ridge Elementary School, DeKalb County, Georgia, near Decatur (Atlanta area) - DeKalb County School District
- Laurel Ridge Elementary School, Fairfax, Virginia (Washington DC area) - Fairfax County Public Schools
