= Tobie Grant =

Tobie Kendall Grant (1887–1968), known as Aunt Toby, was an American philanthropist in Georgia. She worked in the insurance business, was renowned for fortune telling, and was an African American community leader in Scottdale. She donated land for a park (Tobie Grant Park), recreation center, and library - all named for her.

Grant was a Republican Party delegate.

The Scottdale-Tobie Grant Homework Center was named for her, as was Tobie Grant Manor, a low-income housing development built in 1966 on 55 acres. The latter was demolished starting in late 2014. There is also a Tobie Grant Lane.
