= Towers High School =

Public high school in Belvedere Park, Georgia, United States

Location
- 3919 Brookcrest Circle; Decatur, Georgia; United States; 33°44′50″N 84°14′12″W

Information
- Type: Public
- Motto: "Titan Way"
- Established: 1963
- School district: DeKalb County School District
- Principal: Dr. Stacey Barlow
- Teaching staff: 50.00 (FTE)
- Enrollment: 769 (2023–2024)
- Student to teacher ratio: 15.38
- Colors: Maroon and white
- Mascot: Titans
- Website: towershs.dekalb.k12.ga.us

Towers High School (THS) is a high school in unincorporated DeKalb County, Georgia, United States. It is a part of the DeKalb County School System. It is physically within the Belvedere Park census-designated place, but has a Decatur postal address.

The school was built in 1963–1964 and currently includes 9th through 12th grades. In 1963, initially attending double sessions at Avondale High School, grades 8-10 moved into the school during the fall. The cafeteria and gymnasium were still to be completed. THS subsequently added a junior and senior class during the next two years. At that time period there were no middle schools, elementary was 1-7 and traditional high schools were 8–12. The first class graduated in 1966 and the first class to complete all five years at the school graduated on June 3, 1968.

== School activities ==
The school offers activities including Air Force Junior Reserve Officers' Training Corps (AFJROTC GA-955) National Champions 2001 Armed Regulation Drill, Art Club, Beta Club, Career Discovery (Mentoring), Drama Club, Family, Career, and Community Leaders of America (FCCLA), Forensics Club, Future Business Leaders of America (FBLA), Japanese/Anime Club, Literary Magazine, Marching Band, Mu Alpha Theta (Math Club), and National Honor Society.

== Athletics ==
The school's sports teams are named the Titans.

Towers High School recently re-formed a tennis and volleyball team.

The football team currently plays at Avondale Stadium.

== Notable alumni ==
- Jan Hooks, Saturday Night Live actor, attended, did not graduate
- Michael W. Jackson, Alabama District Attorney
- Jacquees, American R&B singer and songwriter
- Ricky Jones, professional baseball player
- Richard Jewell, security guard credited with heroism during the Centennial Olympic Park bombing, later received international attention when he was falsely accused of perpetrating the bombing himself
- Dar'shun Kendrick, politician
- C. J. Marable, professional football player
- Da'Norris Searcy, professional football player
- Julius Williams, professional football player
- Devonte Wyatt, professional football player
- Jimmy Poulos. professional football player
