= Georgia School for the Deaf =

School in Cave Spring, Georgia, U.S.

Coordinates: 34°05′50″N 85°20′58″W

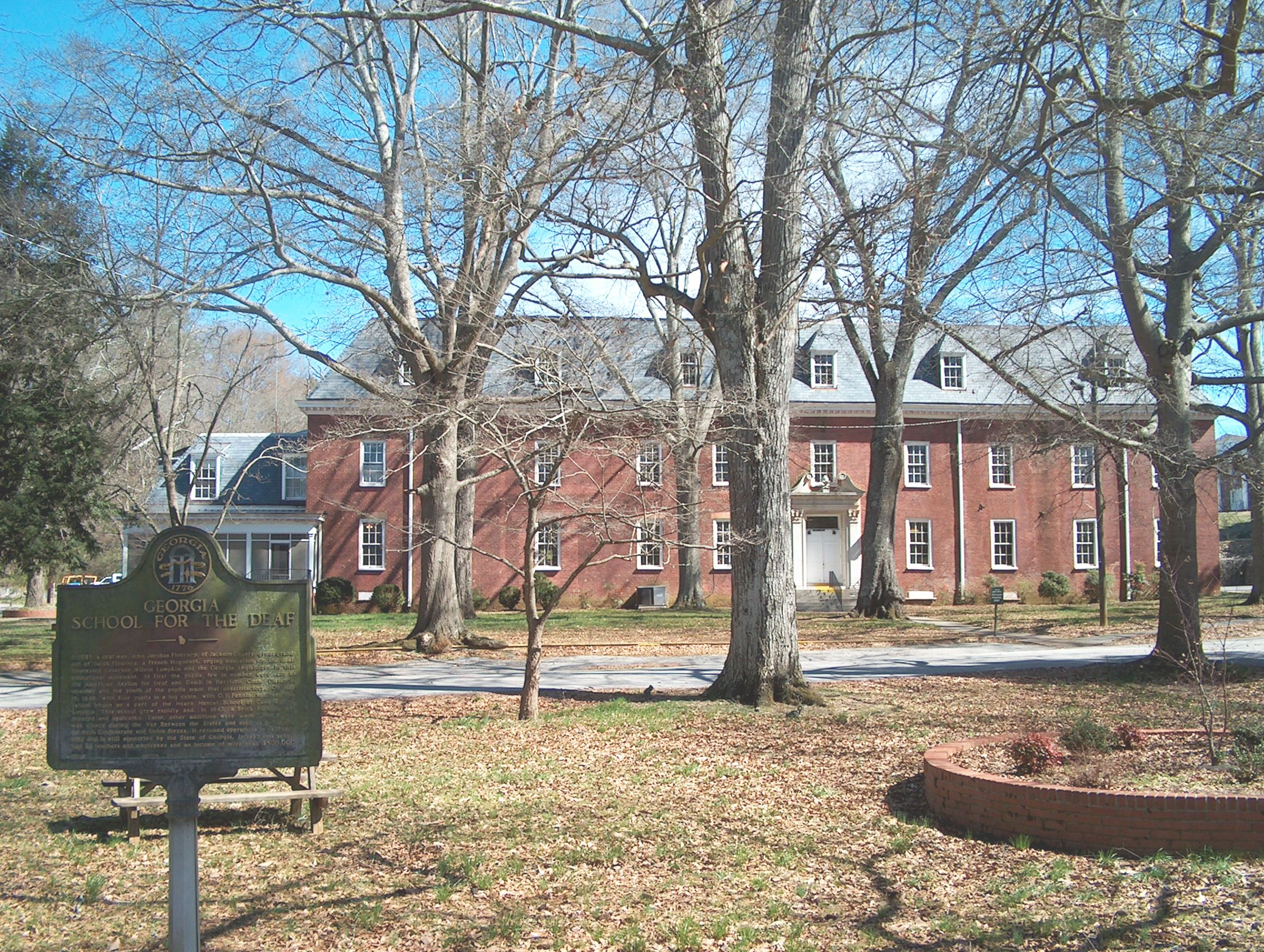
- Fannin Hall, formerly a part of the GSD, is now the city hall of Cave Spring. One of the earliest buildings of the old GSD campus, it was used as a field hospital for American Civil War soldiers.

Location
- 232 Perry Farm Road SW; Cave Spring, Georgia 30124; United States

Information
- Type: School for the deaf, state school
- Established: 1846; 180 years ago
- Superintendent: Sharion Gooden
- Staff: 16.00 (FTE)
- Grades: PK-12
- Student to teacher ratio: 3.94
- Colors: Green and gold
- Mascot: Tiger
- Team name: Tigers
- Languages: American Sign Language, English
- Website: www.gsdweb.org

Georgia School for the Deaf (GSD) is a public residential school for the deaf. GSD provides comprehensive education and services to deaf and hard-of-hearing students between the ages of three and twenty-two. Located in Cave Spring, Georgia, United States, the school offers day and residential programs which meet the academic, social and physical needs of students in a bilingual (American Sign Language and English) environment. It was established in 1846 and is one of three public state schools operated by the Georgia Department of Education.

== History ==
Located in Northwest Georgia near Rome, Georgia School for the Deaf is in the scenic Vann's Valley. It is Georgia's only residential school serving Deaf and Hard-of-Hearing students. GSD was established in 1846 on the grounds of the Hearn Academy by one of its teachers, O. P. Fannin. A log cabin, a $5,000 legislative grant, and four students began a more than 170-years-long tradition of service to children across the state. GSD was the eleventh residential school for the deaf established in the United States. Prior to its establishment, the State of Georgia had no dedicated educational facilities for deaf students, and only wealthy families in Georgia had the possibility of educating such children via privately operated schools in Europe.

Its original name was the Georgia Institution for the Deaf and Dumb. Originally it only took white students. It began admitting black students in 1882, but housed and educated them separately due to segregation of educational facilities common in the state. The segments for white and black students had different curricula and were fully separated from one another.

In the 1950s the institution began paying black employees at the same rate it paid white employees. The school's racial groups integrated fully in 1975.

In 1990 there was a study headed by two employees of Gallaudet University that concluded that the Georgia Department of Education should do more to ensure more children were placed at Georgia School for the Deaf and at the two other state schools for disabled children, Atlanta Area School for the Deaf and Georgia Academy for the Blind, as all three were under-utilized.

== Student body ==
It had 174 students in 1990, with most of them not being from the Atlanta metropolitan area. The school served ages 3–22; most of them were 14 and older and about 40% had other disabilities with their bodies or minds.

== Campus ==
GSD has an extensive campus of almost 500 acres (2.0 km^{2}) in the small community of Cave Spring. The relationship between Cave Spring and GSD is one-of-a-kind because many residents and business owners are able to communicate with American Sign Language. GSD is currently based on the Perry Farm, on the outskirts of Cave Spring, but was originally located in Downtown Cave Spring in what is now the Cave Spring City Hall.

== Residential students ==
GSD includes dormitory facilities.

Students are transported to their homes every weekend.

== Athletics ==
Georgia School for the Deaf has a varsity basketball team for girls and boys and a girls volleyball team. It the past the school has had football, soccer, and track and field programs, but these are not offered as of 2024.

The female and male varsity basketball teams at GSD compete in the Mason-Dixon Tournament yearly. In 2008 the GSD Lady Tigers won the Mason-Dixon Tournament; it was their first win since 1980.

The GSD football team competed against deaf and hearing schools. They used what some would call their "hearing disadvantage" to their benefit by using sign language in their huddles and mental rhythmic plays.

=== Athletes ===
Willie Brown played basketball at GSD. In his sophomore year he was 6 feet 6 inches (1.98 m) and averaged 28 points, 12 rebounds a game. He was voted the number one high school player in northwest Georgia. Brown holds the school record of 2,016 points over four years in basketball at GSD. After graduating, he pursued college basketball at Hofstra University in New York, where he played alongside hearing teammates.

== Requirements ==
To be eligible for admission at GSD, students must be between the ages of 3 and 21 and have an audio-metric hearing loss of 55 dB or greater in the better ear. To live on campus, students must be between the ages of 4 and 21. Students under the age of 4 are eligible for day school admission.

== Legacy ==
The book The Segregated Georgia School for the Deaf: 1882–1975 discusses the period in which the school admitted black students but housed them in separate facilities. Its coauthors, Clemmie Whatley and Ron Knorr, are professors at Mercer University, and the former is from Cave Springs.
