= Omar Dorsey =

American actor

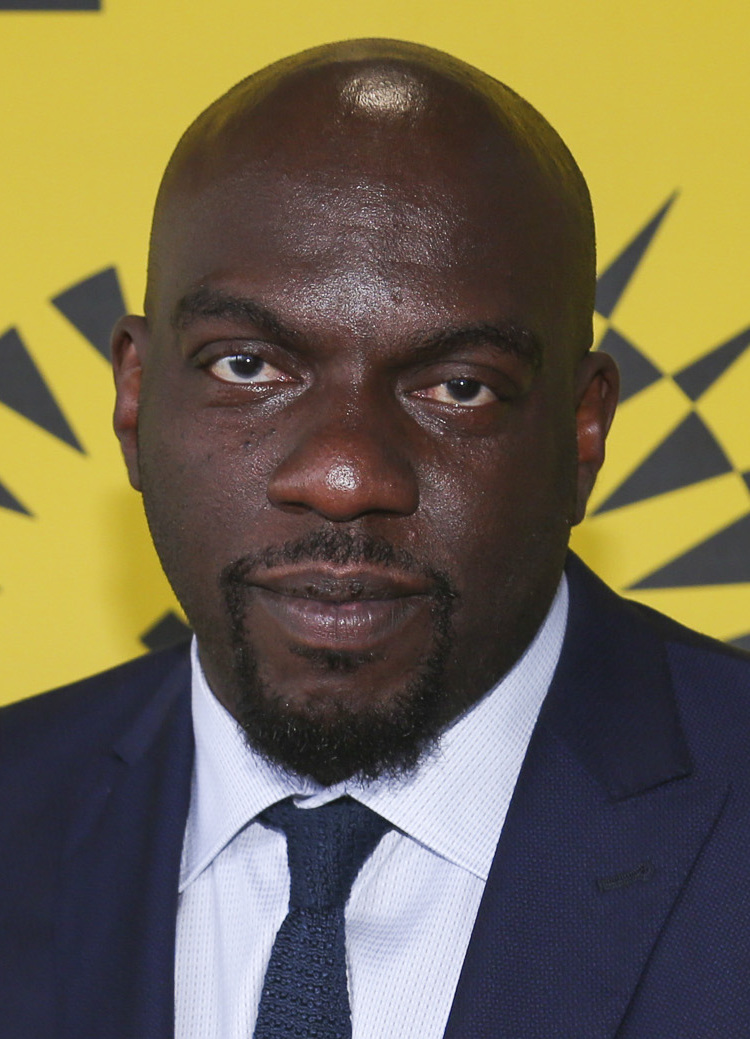
- Dorsey at the 2017 Miami International Film Festival showing of Cargo
- Born: Decatur, Georgia, U.S
- Occupation: Actor
- Years active: 2000–present
- Spouse: Crystle Roberson (m. 2023)
- Children: 3

Omar Dorsey is an American actor. He has appeared in films The Blind Side (2009), Django Unchained (2012), and Selma (2014) playing James Orange. In 2016, Dorsey began starring as Hollingsworth "Hollywood" Desonier in the Oprah Winfrey Network drama series Queen Sugar.

== Career ==
Dorsey played small parts in a number of films early in his career, including Juwanna Mann, Starsky & Hutch, and The Blind Side. In 2012, he co-starred in Django Unchained. On television, he guest-starred on ER, The Shield, The Mentalist, Castle, Rizzoli & Isles, and NCIS. He had recurring roles in the Showtime drama Ray Donovan as Cookie Brown, the Fox comedy-drama Rake, and the HBO comedy Eastbound & Down.

In 2014, Dorsey played Civil Rights Movement activist James Orange in the historical drama film Selma directed by Ava DuVernay. In 2016, DuVernay cast Dorsey in her drama series Queen Sugar for Oprah Winfrey Network. Dorsey appears as Sheriff Barker in the horror films Halloween, Halloween Kills, and Halloween Ends.

== Personal life ==
Dorsey was born in Decatur, Georgia. He is an alumnus of the DeKalb School of the Arts, a magnet school in the DeKalb County School District.

In 2019, he met director Crystle Roberson at the Toronto International Film Festival. They began dating and were wed on November 5, 2023. Together, they have a son. Dorsey, who lives in Los Angeles, also has two daughters from a prior marriage.

== Filmography ==
=== Film ===
Year	Title	Role	Notes
2000	Road Trip	Lawrence	
2001	Boycott	MLK Guard	TV movie
2001	Losing Grace	Opposing Player	
2002	Juwanna Mann	Rickey	
2002	Drumline	James	
2004	Starsky & Hutch	Lamell	
2005	The Reading Room	Ned	TV movie
2006	Our House	Milkbone	TV movie
2006	School for Scoundrels	Lawrence	
2006	13 Graves	Carl Brown	TV movie
2008	Ninja Cheerleaders	Manny	
2009	Race to Witch Mountain	The Vegas Police Officer Hough	
2009	The Blind Side	'Big Tony' Hamilton	
2010	The Wronged Man	Leroy Matthews	TV movie
2010	Louis	Walter	
2011	Setup	G Money	
2012	Django Unchained	Chicken Charlie	
2013	Americana	The Voice	TV movie
2014	Heaven's Hard Pitches	Michael Oso	Short
2014	Selma	James Orange	
2015	Hollywood Adventures	Airport Staff	
2015	Viper	Andre	Short
2015	Bad Things	Pugie Hudson	Short
2016	9 Rides	Uber Pool Man	
2016	Dog Eat Dog	Moon Man	
2017	Cargo	Eddie	
2017	Thank You for Your Service	Dante	
2017	Say No MO!	Mo	
2017	Sins of the Father	Derrick	Short
2018	Halloween	Sheriff Barker	
2018	Jump	Uncle Charlie	Short
2019	Bolden!	Walter	
2019	Harriet	Bigger Long	
2020	Chat - A Covid 19 Story	Lorenzo	Short
2020	Power Corrupts	Chris Duvoe	
2021	Halloween Kills	Sheriff Barker	
2022	Halloween Ends	Sheriff Barker	

=== Television ===
Year	Title	Role	Notes
2000	The Jersey	Sharpe	Episode: "Stealing the Spotlight"
2001	Going to California	Dobsie	TV Series
2005	ER	Captain Guildon	Episode: "Here and There"
2005	Yes, Dear	Doctor	Episode: "Senior Olympics"
2005	The Shield	Jamal	Episode: "String Theory"
2006	Entourage	Thug #1	Episode: "I Wanna Be Sedated"
2007	K-Ville	Sonny Gossett	Recurring Cast
2007	Lincoln Heights	Chet 'Sawbone' Mitchell	Episode: "Out with a Bang"
2010	Detroit 1-8-7	Goat	Episode: "Local Hero/Overboard"
2010–12	Rizzoli & Isles	Big Mo	Recurring Cast: Season 1, Guest: Season 3
2011	The Mentalist	CBI Agent Anthony Niskin	Episode: "Little Red Book"
2012	Chuck	St. Germaine	Episode: "Chuck Versus the Kept Man"
2012	Castle	Biggie Slim	Episode: "The Limey"
2012	Bones	Chad Lester	Episode: "The Partners in the Divorce"
2013	CSI: NY	Thomas Reynolds	Episode: "Blood Actually"
2013	NCIS	Vernon Dale	Episode: "Past, Present, and Future"
2013	Eastbound & Down	Dontel Benjamin	Recurring Cast: Season 4
2014	Rake	Roy	Recurring Cast
2014	Ray Donovan	Cookie Brown	Recurring Cast: Season 2
2015	Battle Creek	Travis Taylor	Episode: "The Battle Creek Way"
2016	Teachers	Mr. Tomlinson	Episode: "Hot Lunch"
2016	Aquarius	Ralph Church	Recurring Cast: Season 2
2016–22	Queen Sugar	Hollingsworth "Hollywood" Desonier	Main Cast
2017	Blue Bloods	Ernie "Goodnight" Mason	Episode: "Not Fade Away"
2017	Hell's Kitchen	Himself	Guest diner/Stand Up to Cancer contributor; Episode: "Aerial Maneuvers"
2019	When They See Us	Elombre Brath	Recurring Cast
2020	Soul City	Cab Driver	Main Cast
2021	Genius: Aretha	James Cleveland	Recurring Cast: Season 3
2021	The Lower Bottoms	Pastor Green	Episode: "Cesspool of Crime/Campaign Trail from Hell"
2022	Power Book III: Raising Kanan	Cartier "Duns" Fareed	Recurring Cast: Season 2
2022	Cherish the Day	Hollingsworth "Hollywood" Desonier	Recurring Cast: Season 2
2023	Snowfall	Clyde	Episode: "Ebony and Ivory"
2023	Bookie	Rayfield "Ray" Ballard	Main Cast
