= Devonte Wyatt =

American football player (born 1998)

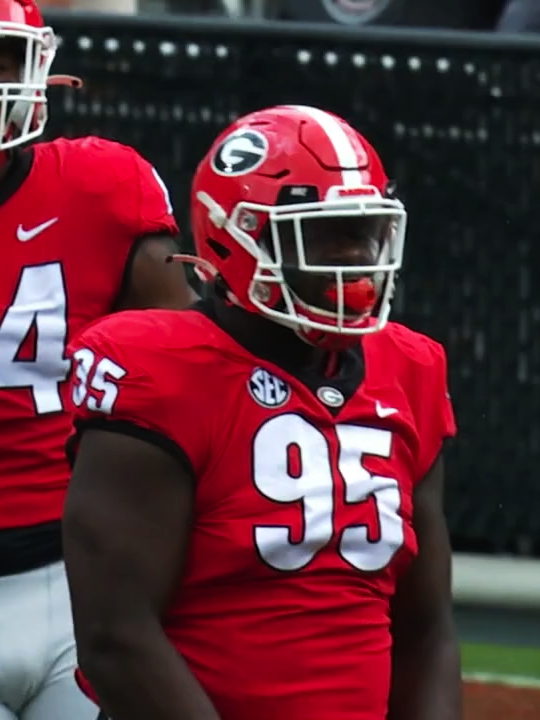
- Wyatt with the Georgia Bulldogs in 2021

No. 95 – Green Bay Packers
- Position: Defensive tackle
- Roster status: Active

Personal information
- Born: March 31, 1998 (age 28); Decatur, Georgia, U.S.
- Listed height: 6 ft 3 in (1.91 m)
- Listed weight: 304 lb (138 kg)

Career information
- High school: Towers (Decatur, Georgia)
- College: Hutchinson CC (2017); Georgia (2018–2021)
- NFL draft: 2022: 1st round, 28th overall pick

Career history
- Green Bay Packers (2022–present)

Awards and highlights
- CFP national champion (2021); Second-team All-American (2021); First-team All-SEC (2021)

Career NFL statistics as of Week 10, 2026
- Total tackles: 122
- Sacks: 19
- Forced fumbles: 2
- Fumble recoveries: 3
- Pass deflections: 3
- Stats at Pro Football Reference

Devonte Malik Wyatt (born March 31, 1998) is an American professional football defensive tackle for the Green Bay Packers of the National Football League (NFL). He played college football for the Georgia Bulldogs and was selected by the Packers in the first round of the 2022 NFL draft.

== Early life ==
Wyatt grew up in Decatur, Georgia and attended Towers High School. He was rated a three-star recruit and initially committed to play college football at South Carolina before de-committing in favor of Georgia. Wyatt was ruled academically ineligible to play at Georgia and did not enroll.

== College career ==
Wyatt began his collegiate career at Hutchinson Community College in order to meet the academic requirements to play Division I football. As a freshman, he had 30 tackles, 4.5 tackles for loss, and three sacks. Wyatt qualified academically to enroll at Georgia after his freshman season.

Wyatt was part of Georgia's defensive line rotation as a sophomore and as a junior. As a senior, Wyatt started all ten of Georgia's games and had 25 tackles, two tackles for loss, and 14 quarterback hurries. After considering entering the 2021 NFL draft, he decided to utilize the extra year of eligibility granted to college athletes who played in the 2020 season due to the coronavirus pandemic and return to Georgia for a fifth season. Wyatt was named first-team All-Southeastern Conference by the league's coaches and a second-team All-American by the Associated Press in the 2021 season. On January 15, 2022, Wyatt declared for the 2022 NFL draft.

== Professional career ==
Pre-draft measurables
Height	Weight	Arm length	Hand span	Wingspan	40-yard dash	10-yard split	20-yard split	20-yard shuttle	Three-cone drill	Vertical jump	Broad jump
6 ft 2 7/8 in (1.90 m)	304 lb (138 kg)	32 5/8 in (0.83 m)	9 7/8 in (0.25 m)	6 ft 6 1/4 in (1.99 m)	4.77 s	1.66 s	2.73 s	4.63 s	7.45 s	29.0 in (0.74 m)	9 ft 3 in (2.82 m)
All values from NFL Combine/Pro Day

Wyatt was selected in the first round with the 28th overall pick by the Green Bay Packers in the 2022 NFL draft. On May 6, 2022, he signed his rookie contract.

On May 1, 2025, the Packers picked up the fifth-year option in Wyatt's contract. Entering the 2025 season Wyatt was named as a starting defensive tackle after Tedarrell Slaton signed with the Cincinnati Bengals as a free agent, and the Packers traded away Kenny Clark. He missed two games early in the season after suffering an ankle injury against Dallas. He was placed on injured reserve on December 3, due to a fibula fracture and ankle ligament tear suffered in Week 13 against the Detroit Lions.

On July 27, 2026, Wyatt and the Packers agreed to a three–year, $57 million contract extension.

== NFL career statistics ==
Legend
**Bold**	Career high

=== Regular season ===
Year	Team	Games		Tackles					Interceptions						Fumbles				
Year	Team	GP	GS	Cmb	Solo	Ast	Sck	TFL	Int	Yds	Avg	Lng	TD	PD	FF	Fmb	FR	Yds	TD
2023	GB	16	0	15	8	7	1.5	0	0	0	0.0	0	0	1	**1**	0	0	0	0
2023	GB	17	5	**36**	**18**	**18**	**5.5**	6	0	0	0.0	0	0	0	0	0	1	0	0
2024	GB	14	0	23	17	6	5.0	**9**	0	0	0.0	0	0	0	0	0	**2**	0	0
2025	GB	10	10	27	15	12	4.0	6	0	0	0.0	0	0	**2**	0	0	0	0	0
Career		57	15	101	58	43	16.0	21	0	0	0.0	0	0	3	1	0	3	0	0
Source: pro-football-reference.com

=== Postseason ===
Year	Team	Games		Tackles					Interceptions						Fumbles				
Year	Team	GP	GS	Cmb	Solo	Ast	Sck	TFL	Int	Yds	Avg	Lng	TD	PD	FF	Fmb	FR	Yds	TD
2023	GB	2	1	**2**	**2**	0	0.0	0	0	0	0.0	0	0	0	0	0	0	0	0
2024	GB	1	0	0	0	0	0.0	0	0	0	0.0	0	0	0	0	0	0	0	0
Career		3	1	2	2	0	0.0	0	0	0	0.0	0	0	0	0	0	0	0	0
Source: pro-football-reference.com
