= Jimmy Poulos =

American gridiron football player (born 1952)

No. 26, 20
- Position: Running back

Personal information
- Born: March 14, 1952 (age 74); Decatur, Georgia, U.S.
- Listed height: 5 ft 10 in (1.78 m)
- Listed weight: 195 lb (88 kg)

Career information
- High school: Towers (Decatur)
- College: Georgia (1970–1973)
- NFL draft: 1974: 13th round, 319th overall pick

Career history
- Winnipeg Blue Bombers (1974); Jacksonville Express (1975)

James Poulos (born March 14, 1952) is an American former professional football running back who played for the Winnipeg Blue Bombers of the Canadian Football League and the Jacksonville Express of the World Football League. He played college football at the University of Georgia and was selected by the St. Louis Cardinals in the thirteenth round of the 1974 NFL draft.

== Early life and college ==
James Poulos was born on March 14, 1952, in Decatur, Georgia. He attended Towers High School in Decatur.

Poulos was a member of the University of Georgia Bulldogs from 1970 to 1973 and a three-year letterman from 1971 to 1973. He rushed 144 times for 733 yards and eight touchdowns in 1971 while also catching six passes for 89 yards and one touchdown. In 1972, he recorded 150 carries for 556 yards and seven touchdowns, and six receptions for 27 yards. As a senior in 1973, Poulos totaled 167 rushing attempts for 702 yards and three touchdowns, and six catches for the third straight year for ten yards and one touchdown.

== Professional career ==
Poulos was selected by the St. Louis Cardinals in the thirteenth round of the 1974 NFL draft as the 319th overall pick and by the Birmingham Americans in the 15th round of the 1974 WFL draft as the 173rd overall pick. However, Poulos instead signed with the Winnipeg Blue Bombers of the Canadian Football League. He played in six games for the Blue Bombers during the 1974 season, rushing 34 times for 89 yards and catching eight passes for 42 yards. He also lost four fumbles and suffered a knee injury.

In 1975, Poulos played for the Jacksonville Express of the World Football League in 1975, recording 21 carries for 39 yards and one touchdown, three receptions for 29 yards, and three kickoff returns for 49 yards.
