= Cross Keys High School =

Public high school in Georgia, United States

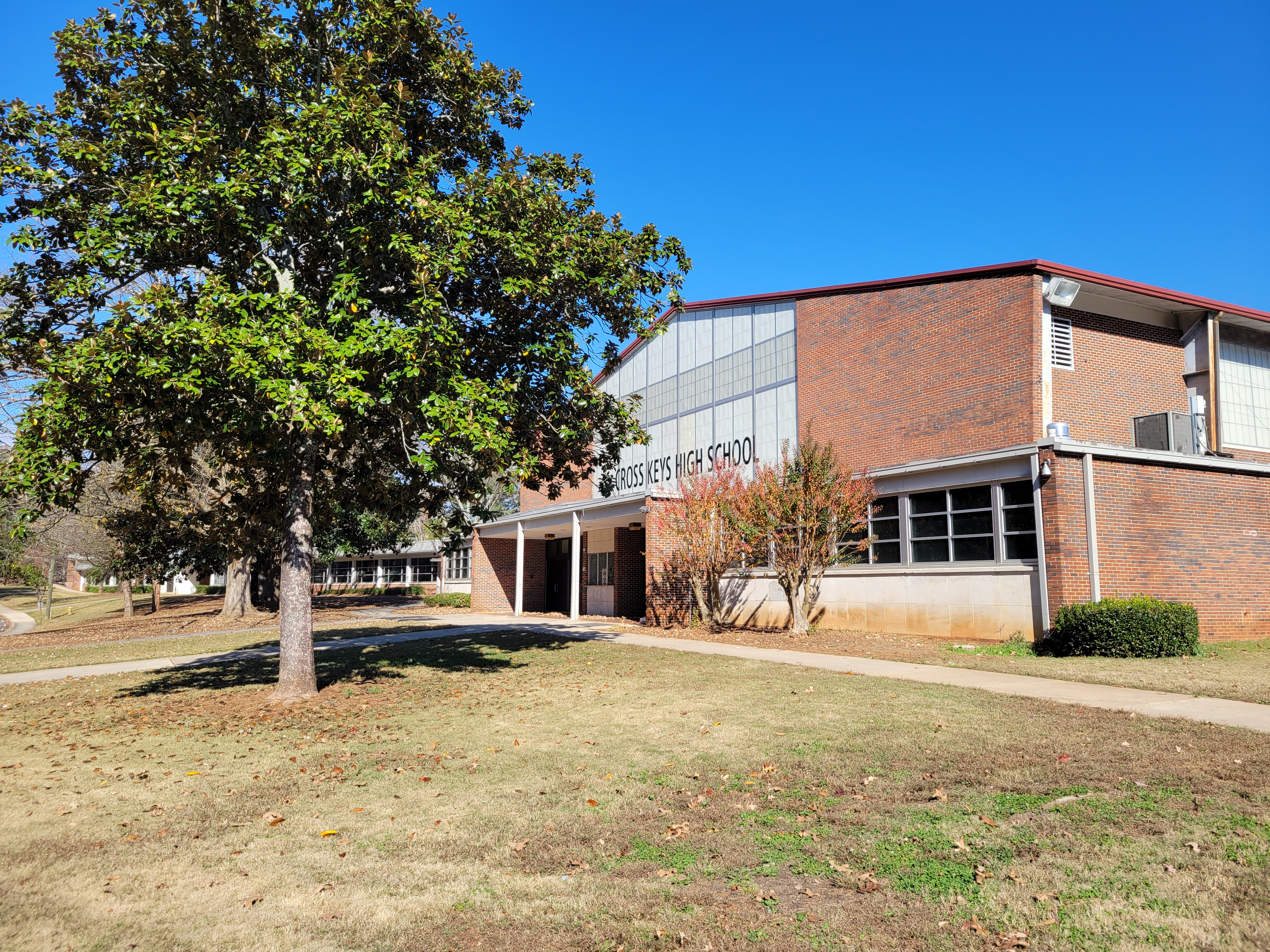
- Cross Keys High School

Location
- 1626 North Druid Hills Road NE; Brookhaven, Georgia 30319; United States
- Coordinates: 33.8436°N 84.3381°W

Information
- Type: Public
- Established: 1958
- School district: DeKalb County School District
- Grades: 9–12
- Enrollment: Approx. 1,796 (2023–2024)
- Campus type: Suburban
- Mascot: Phoenix
- Website: crosskeyshs.dekalb.k12.ga.us

Cross Keys High School is a public high school located in Brookhaven, Georgia, United States. Established in 1958, it is part of the DeKalb County School District and serves students from the Buford Highway Corridor in Brookhaven, Chamblee, and Doraville.

== History ==
Cross Keys High School opened its doors in 1958. In 1965, following the integration of schools in DeKalb County, students from the all-Black Lynwood Park High School were transferred to Cross Keys High School. This transition was part of the district's efforts to comply with desegregation mandates.

In June 2024, the DeKalb County School Board approved changing the school's mascot from the Indians to the Phoenix, in response to concerns about cultural sensitivity.

== Demographics ==
For the 2016–2017 school year the student body was 86% Hispanic, 6% Black, 7% Asian, and 1% White. It is the most culturally diverse high school in the state, with students from 65 countries who speak 75 different languages.

1,547 students were in attendance for the 2016–2017 school year. Of those, 1,330 were reported to be economically disadvantaged.

As of the 2023–2024 school year, Cross Keys High School had an enrollment of approximately 1,796 students, exceeding its capacity by 500 students.

== Academics ==
Cross Keys High School's overall performance is higher than 62% of schools in the state, with academic growth higher than 99% of schools in Georgia.

Cross Keys was selected as a Georgia School of Excellence in 1996.

== Athletics ==
The school's athletic teams compete as the Phoenix. The football team plays at Adams Memorial Stadium. Cross Keys offers a variety of sports, including soccer, basketball, and track and field.
