= Avondale High School (DeKalb County, Georgia) =

Location
- 1192 Clarendon Avenue; Avondale Estates, Georgia 30002; United States
- 33°45′32″N 84°16′3″W

Information
- Type: Public high school
- Established: 1954
- Status: Closed
- Closed: May 20, 2011
- Grades: 8–12

Avondale High School is a former high school located in unincorporated Dekalb County, Georgia, United States; a part of the DeKalb County School District, it was adjacent to, but not inside, the City of Avondale Estates. It closed in May 2011. Its former campus is now used exclusively by the DeKalb School of the Arts, a magnet school.

Its feeder schools were Avondale Middle, Avondale Elementary, Forest Hills Elementary, Knollwood Elementary, Midway Elementary, and Robert Shaw Elementary.

== History ==
The school was constructed in 1954. The academic performance of the school declined by the 1990s. It was scheduled to close after May 20, 2011.

== Athletics ==
Under the guidance of Head Coaches Calvin Ramsey (1951–1969) and Crawford Kennedy (1970–1988), the Avondale Blue Devils football team was one of the top programs in Georgia from the 1950s through 1979. Avondale won 11 region championships and three state championships (1958; tied with Thomasville in 1963 and 1976). The Blue Devils were also state runners-up four times (1957, 1960, 1964, and 1971). During this time, 61 Avondale players were named to the All-State team. In November 1978, The Atlanta Journal-Constitution cited Avondale as the winningest high school football team in Georgia for the previous 20 years (1958–1978 record 199-30-6, for a winning percentage of 85.96%). During the 1990s and 2000s, the football program declined. However, in the mid-2000s, the Lady Blue Devils basketball team won the Class 3A State championship in 2006.

== Notable alumni ==
- Stacey Abrams
- Bill Anderson
- Erica Ash
- Cliff Austin
- Danny Buggs
- Omar J. Dorsey
- Leslie Abrams Gardner
- Chip Kell
- Dorian Missick
- Kelsey Scott
