= Clarkston, Georgia =

City in Georgia, United States

Clarkston
- City
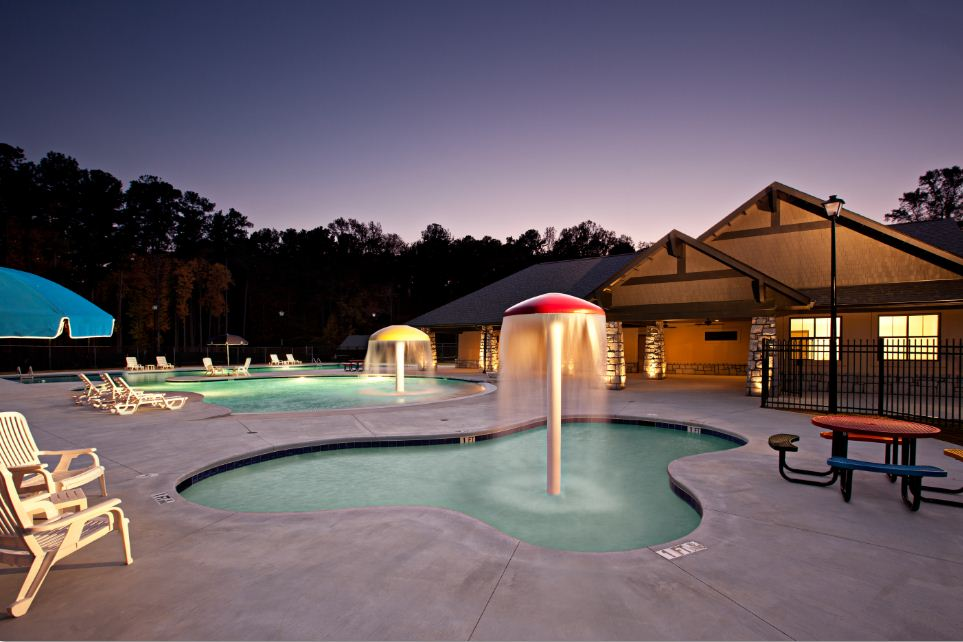
- Milam Park

- Flag
- Motto: “Where Possibilities Grow”
- Location in DeKalb County and the state of Georgia
- Coordinates: 33°48′37″N 84°14′24″W
- Country: United States
- State: Georgia
- County: DeKalb

Government
  - Type: Council-Manager
  - Mayor: Beverly H. Burks
  - City Council: Debra Johnson, Vice-Mayor Yterenickia Bell Jamie Carroll Awet Eyasu Laura Hopkins Susan Hood

Area
  - Total: 1.86 sq mi (4.81 km^{2})
  - Land: 1.85 sq mi (4.78 km^{2})
  - Water: 0.015 sq mi (0.04 km^{2})
- Elevation: 1,020 ft (311 m)

Population (2020)
  - Total: 14,756
  - Density: 7,999/sq mi (3,088.4/km^{2})
  - Demonym: Clarkstonian
- Time zone: UTC-5 (Eastern (EST))
  - Summer (DST): UTC-4 (EDT)
- ZIP code: 30021
- Area codes: 404, 678
- FIPS code: 13-16544
- GNIS feature ID: 0331411
- Website: www.clarkstonga.gov

Clarkston is a city in DeKalb County, Georgia, United States. The population was 14,756 as of the 2020 census, up from 7,554 in 2010.

The city is noted for its ethnic diversity, and is often referred to as "the most diverse square mile in America" and "the Ellis Island of the South." In the 1990s, refugee resettlement programs identified Clarkston as a good fit for displaced persons of many backgrounds. The rental market was open, residents were moving farther out from the Atlanta urban core, and Clarkston was the last stop on a transit line into the city. At present, students attending Clarkston High School come from over 50 countries; the local mosque (Masjid al-Momineen, or Mosque of the Faithful in English) has a diverse and sizable congregation; over half the population is estimated by some to be foreign born.

== History ==
A post office called Clarkston has been in operation since 1876. The Georgia General Assembly incorporated the place in 1882 as the "Town of Clarkston", with municipal corporate limits extending in a one-half mile radius from the Georgia Railroad depot. The community was named after W. W. Clark, a railroad official.

== Geography ==
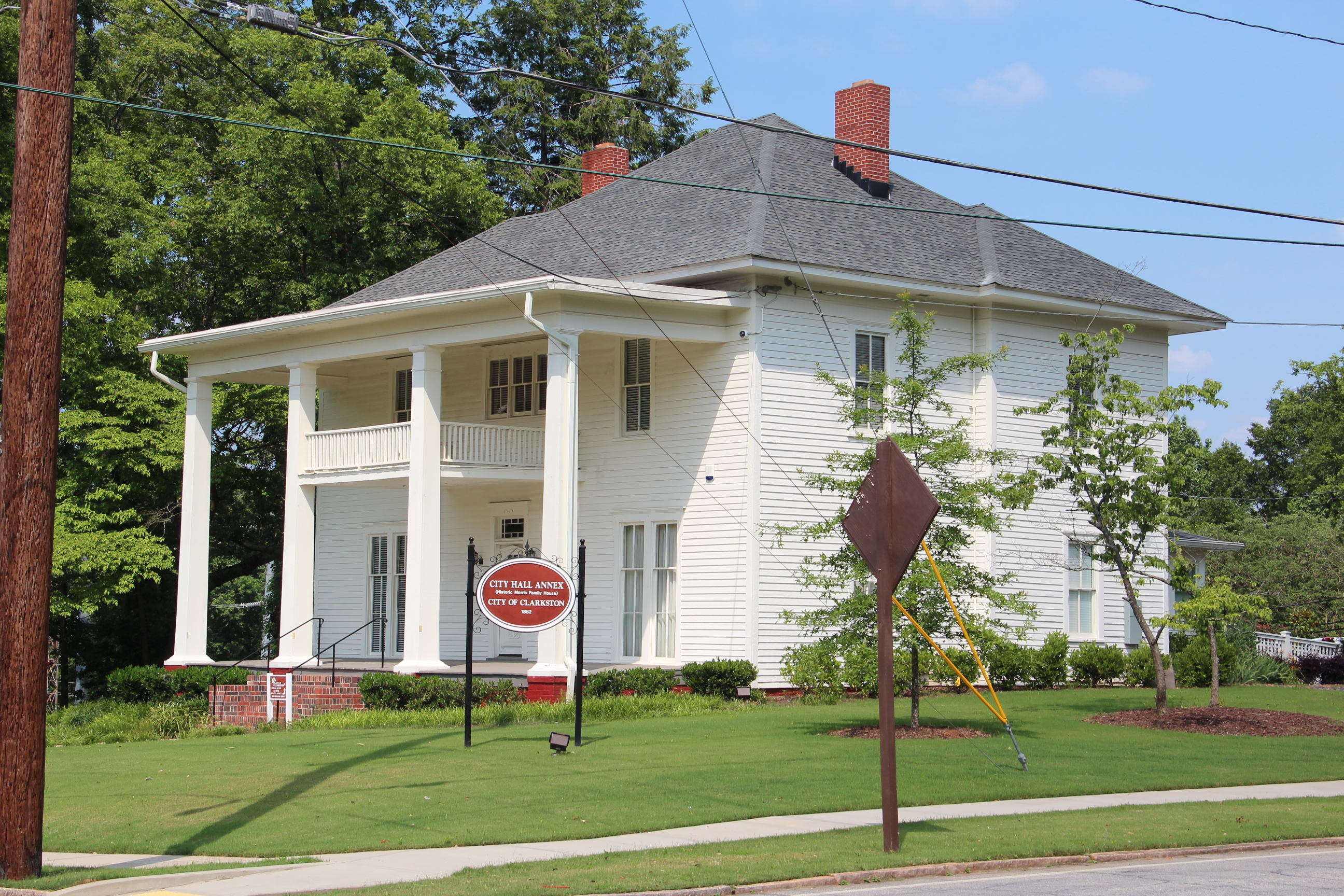
Clarkston City Hall annex.

According to the United States Census Bureau, the city has a total area of 1.1 square miles (2.8 km^{2}), of which 1.0 square mile (2.6 km^{2}) is land and 0.94% is water.

Clarkston is on the Eastern Continental Divide.

== Demographics ==
Historical population
Census	Pop.	Note	%±
1880	33		—
1890	271		721.2%
1900	362		33.6%
1910	349		−3.6%
1920	501		43.6%
1930	606		21.0%
1940	921		52.0%
1950	1,165		26.5%
1960	1,524		30.8%
1970	3,127		105.2%
1980	4,539		45.2%
1990	5,385		18.6%
2000	7,231		34.3%
2010	7,554		4.5%
2020	14,756		95.3%
2025 (est.)	14,431	▼	−2.2%
U.S. Decennial Census; 1850-1870 1870-1880; 1890-1910 1920-1930; 1940 1950 1960; 1970 1980 1990; 2000 2010; 2025

=== Racial and ethnic composition ===
Clarkston city, Georgia – Racial composition Note: the US Census treats Hispanic/Latino as an ethnic category. This table excludes Latinos from the racial categories and assigns them to a separate category. Hispanics/Latinos may be of any race.
Race (NH = Non-Hispanic)	2020	2010	2000	1990	1980
White alone (NH)	8.1% (1,199)	13.1% (990)	17.3% (1,253)	36.4% (1,961)	90% (4,083)
Black alone (NH)	64.3% (9,491)	57.9% (4,373)	55.1% (3,987)	55.6% (2,995)	6.8% (309)
American Indian alone (NH)	0.2% (24)	0.1% (11)	0.1% (8)	0.2% (10)	0% (0)
Asian alone (NH)	19.4% (2,866)	21.4% (1,617)	12.4% (900)	5.6% (299)	0.7% (32)
Pacific Islander alone (NH)	0% (7)	0% (3)	0% (3)		
Other race alone (NH)	0.7% (96)	0.7% (54)	1% (74)	0% (1)	0.4% (16)
Multiracial (NH)	3.6% (524)	3.9% (295)	9.3% (673)	—	—
Hispanic/Latino (any race)	3.7% (549)	2.8% (211)	4.6% (333)	2.2% (119)	2.2% (99)

=== 2020 census ===
As of the 2020 census, Clarkston had a population of 14,756. The median age was 28.6 years. 33.0% of residents were under the age of 18 and 4.7% were 65 years of age or older. For every 100 females there were 96.1 males, and for every 100 females age 18 and over there were 90.1 males age 18 and over.

100.0% of residents lived in urban areas, while 0.0% lived in rural areas.

There were 4,923 households in Clarkston, including 2,341 families. Of all households, 44.9% had children under the age of 18 living in them. Married-couple households made up 33.7% of households, while 22.8% were households with a male householder and no spouse or partner present and 36.7% were households with a female householder and no spouse or partner present. About 26.1% of all households were made up of individuals, and 3.0% had someone living alone who was 65 years of age or older.

There were 5,398 housing units, of which 8.8% were vacant. The homeowner vacancy rate was 1.1% and the rental vacancy rate was 6.9%.

The most reported ancestries were African American (23.6%), Ethiopian (12.0%), Burmese (8.7%), Congolese (4.2%), Nepalese (4.1%), and Afghan (2.3%).

== Education ==
DeKalb County School System operates Clarkston's public schools.

Zoned schools which have attendance boundaries in the residential-zoned portions of the city limits include:

- Jolly, Idlewood, and Indian Creek elementary schools
- Freedom Middle School and Tucker Middle School
- Clarkston High School and Tucker High School

All the school district-operated schools are located outside of the city limits of Clarkston.

Atlanta Area School for the Deaf, operated by the State of Georgia, is in the Clarkston city limits. Additionally, Georgia Fugees Academy Charter School, a charter school, is in the city limits.

The Clarkston Campus of Georgia State University's Perimeter College is just south of the city limits. Georgia Piedmont Technical College, part of the Technical College System of Georgia, is also south of Clarkston.

=== Public libraries ===
DeKalb County Public Library operates the Clarkston Branch.

== Refugee resettlement ==
Georgia is among the states that receive the highest amount of refugees for resettlement, and has resettled more than 37,000 refugees since 1993. Clarkston receives a large portion of these refugees, but arrivals have gradually declined yearly since 2016. In 2016, then Georgia Governor Nathan Deal issued and then reneged on an executive order attempting to cease influx of Syrian refugees into the state. Additionally, as of 2019 federal funding for refugee programs has decreased and executive orders have been issued that allow states increased authority to limit resettlement, which has resulted in the downsizing of several Georgia resettlement organizations.

Organizations that aid the resettlement of refugees in Clarkston include:

- Friends of Refugees
- Fugees Family
- International Rescue Committee of Atlanta
- New American Pathways
- World Relief Atlanta

== Transportation ==
=== Major roads ===
- US 78
- SR 410

=== Mass transit ===
- MARTA Bus 120 connects to MARTA Blue Line rail service at Avondale
- MARTA Bus 125 connects to MARTA Blue Line rail service at Kensington

=== Pedestrians and cycling ===
- Stone Mountain Trail

== In popular culture ==
=== In television ===
- Clarkston was featured in season one of "Good Girls" Netflix series (the fictional supermarket "Fine & Frugal" was shot in Fresh Food Town in the Tahoe Village plaza).
- Clarkston is the setting of the episode "Make Ted Great Again" in the second season of Queer Eye in 2018.
- Clarkston is featured in the episode "It's a Greens Thing" in the first season of Vivan Howard's PBS cooking show Somewhere South in 2020.

== Notable people ==
- Machop Chol (born 1998) – soccer player who represented the South Sudan national team
