= Clarkston High School (Georgia) =

Public high school in Georgia, United States

Coordinates: 33.7933°N 84.2371°W

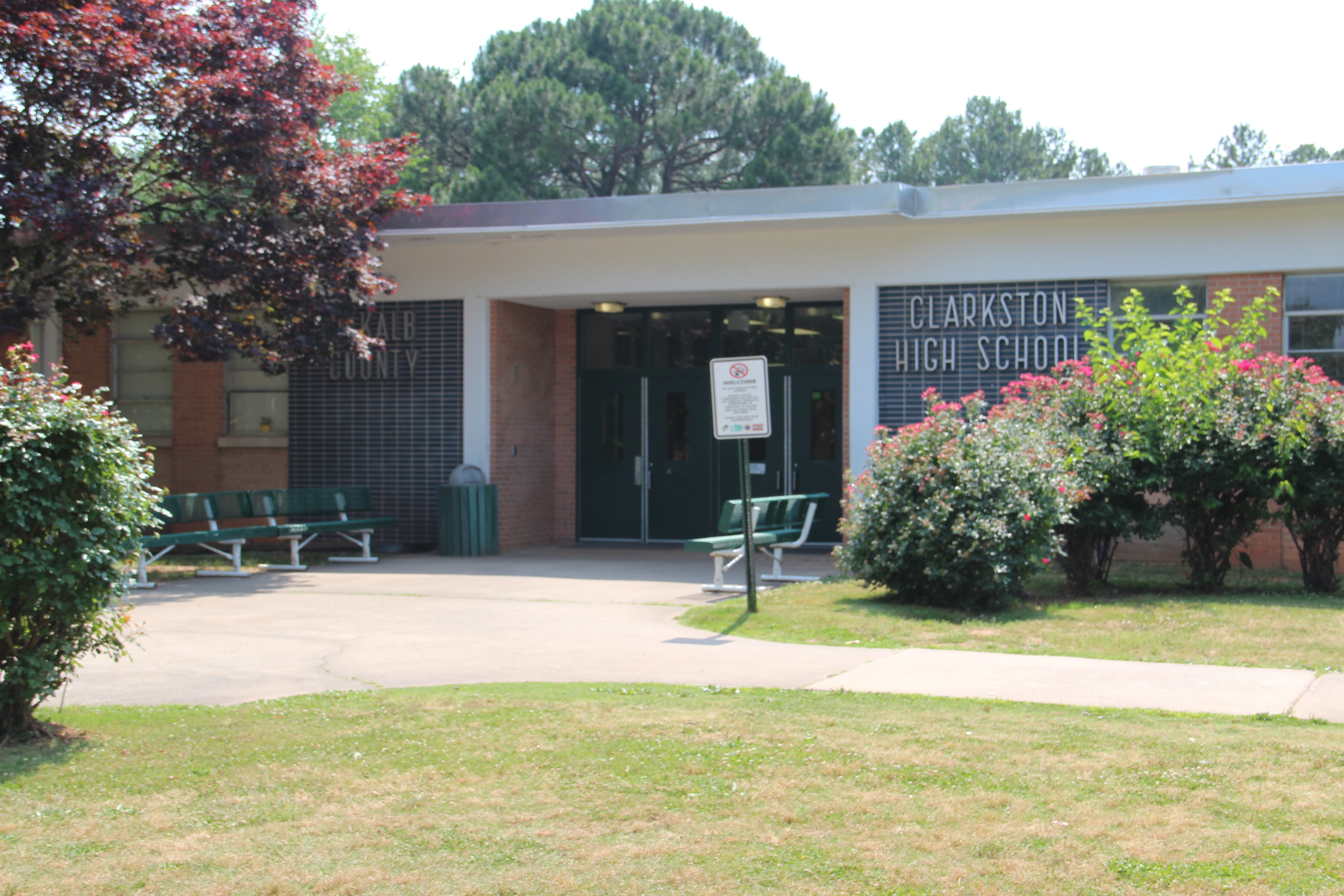
- Clarkston High School

Location
- 618 North Indian Creek Drive; Clarkston, Georgia 30021; United States

Information
- Type: Public school
- Established: September 1958 (67 years ago)
- School district: DeKalb County Schools
- Teaching staff: 91.90 (on an FTE basis)
- Grades: 9–12
- Enrollment: 1,413 (2022–2023)
- Student to teacher ratio: 15.38
- Colors: Green and gold
- Team name: Angora
- Website: https://www.clarkstonhs.dekalb.k12.ga.us/

Clarkston High School is a public high school located at 618 North Indian Creek Drive in unincorporated DeKalb County, Georgia, United States, with a Clarkston postal address in the central part of the county. As part of the DeKalb County School District, it is accredited by the Southern Association of Colleges and Schools.

Clarkston High School has the most diverse student body of all DeKalb County public schools, with 1,421 high schoolers representing 54 different countries in 2021–22. Students were reported to speak 47 languages there in 2014. CHS has DeKalb School System's only program for hearing impaired high school students. Another school for deaf and hard-of-hearing students, Atlanta Area School for the Deaf, is also located in the city of Clarkston, about half a mile from CHS.

The freshman class of 2021-22 had 538 students, many more than in the later grades, which had 298, 271, and 314 students in 10th through 12th grades, respectively. Girls were outnumbered by boys, 46 to 54 percent. The majority ethnic or racial group was Black/African American students (59 percent), followed by Asian students (31 percent), with Hispanic, white, multiracial, and American Indian/Alaska Native students making up the other 10 percent.

The school mascot is the Angora and the school colors are green and gold.

== Athletics ==
The 1989 Clarkston Football Team sent several players to NCAA Division 1 programs.

The 1988 Football Team was the first team in School History led by Coach Tommy Stringer to go 10–0 in the regular season and followed that up with another 10–0 season in 1989.

1986- 4 by 400m Team was the first Relay to Win a state championship with a 3:20.6 winning time. This 4 by 400m team was also voted Track Men of the Year by the Atlanta Track Club.

In 2014, the CHS's boys cross-country team was led by Head Coach Wesley Etienne & staff, surprising champions of the GHSA state title, and they won the state title again in 2015 and 2016. The team had student athletes from over forty countries, including many who arrived in the United States as refugees. In 2016, all eight of the top runners on the team were immigrants from African countries, including Democratic Republic of the Congo, Somalia, and South Sudan.
