= Georgia Academy for the Blind =

School in Macon, Georgia, United States

Coordinates: 32.8481°N 83.6686°W

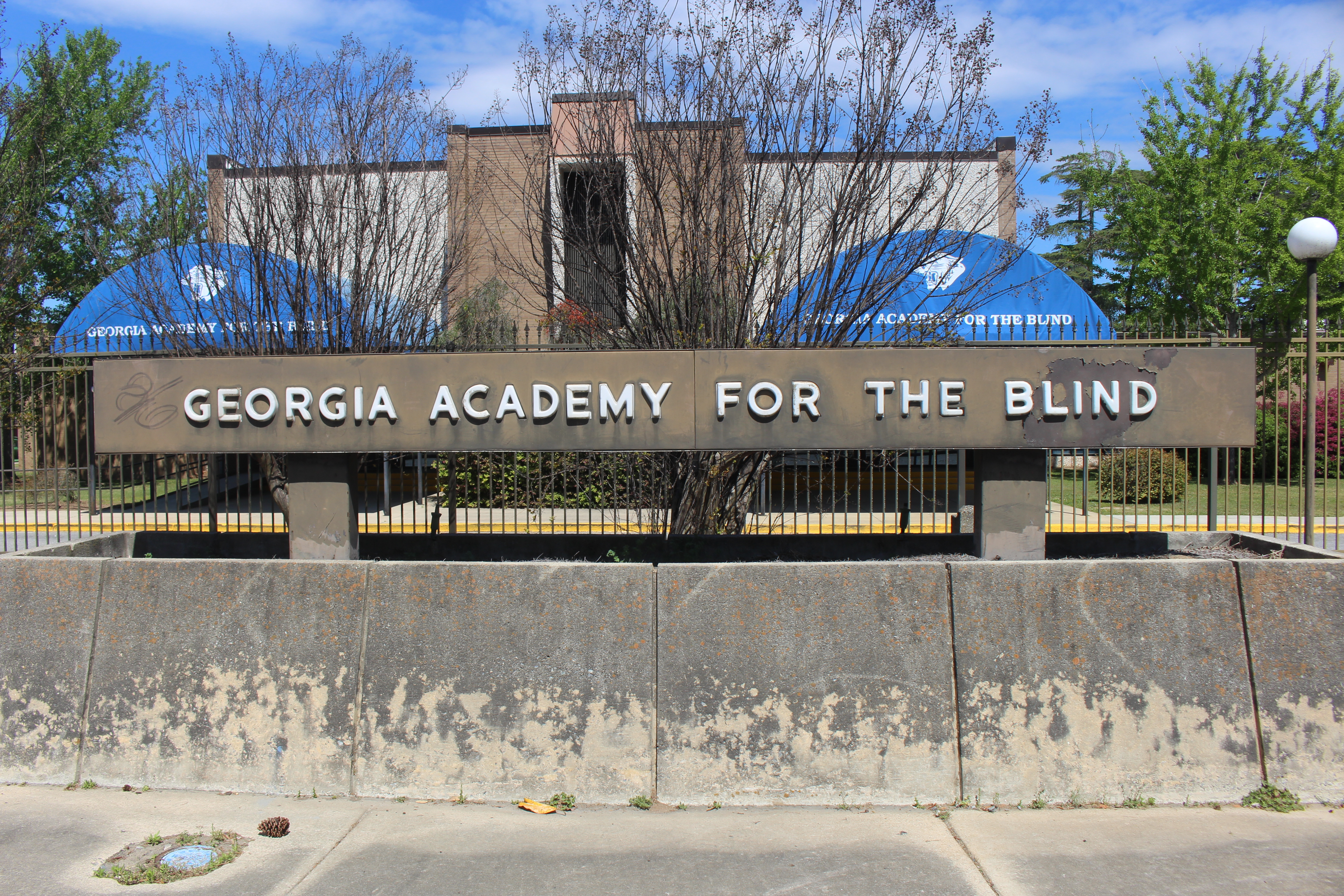
- Macon, Georgia; United States

Information
- Established: 1852; 174 years ago
- Age: 4 to 21
- Enrollment: 170 (1990)

Georgia Academy for the Blind (GAB) is a state-operated public school for the blind in Macon, Georgia. The Georgia Department of Education operates the school.

== History ==
The Georgia Academy for the Blind was established by the Georgia Legislature in 1851 and opened in 1852 with an endowment of $5,000 from the Georgia Legislature and a commitment to an additional $5,000 from the legislature in 1853. The first elected trustees were James M. Green, President; Nathan C. Munroe, Treasurer; Robert A. Smith, Secretary. Mr. W.S. Fortescue was elected Priincipal of the Academy; Mr. M. B. Clark, Musical Instructor; Miss Hannah Guillan, Female Teacher, and Mrs. J. Griswold, Matron. Thomas Ridgeway, a former professor and an alumnus of the school, stated that the folklore is that a mother in the Macon area made efforts to establish the school after her daughter survived an epidemic. In 1851 a group of Georgians petitioned the legislature to have the school established.

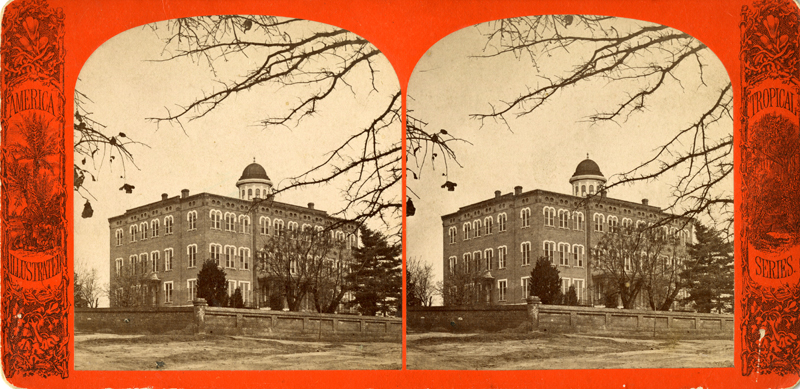
Georgia Academy for the Blind, Orange Street, circa 1876

In the era of de jure educational segregation in the United States, GAB separated its white students from its black students. The school racially integrated circa 1965.

In 1990 there was a study headed by two employees of Gallaudet University that concluded that the Georgia Department of Education should do more to ensure more children were placed at Georgia Academy for the Blind and at the two other state schools for disabled children, Georgia School for the Deaf and Atlanta Area School for the Deaf, as all three were under-utilized.

In 2009 the school's student fund was running out of money.

== Student body ==
In 1990 the school had ages 4–21, with students numbering 170, and with about 33% having disabilities in other aspects. Most of the children lived in school districts which had one or two blind students each, and most of the students did not live in the Atlanta metropolitan area.

== Campus ==
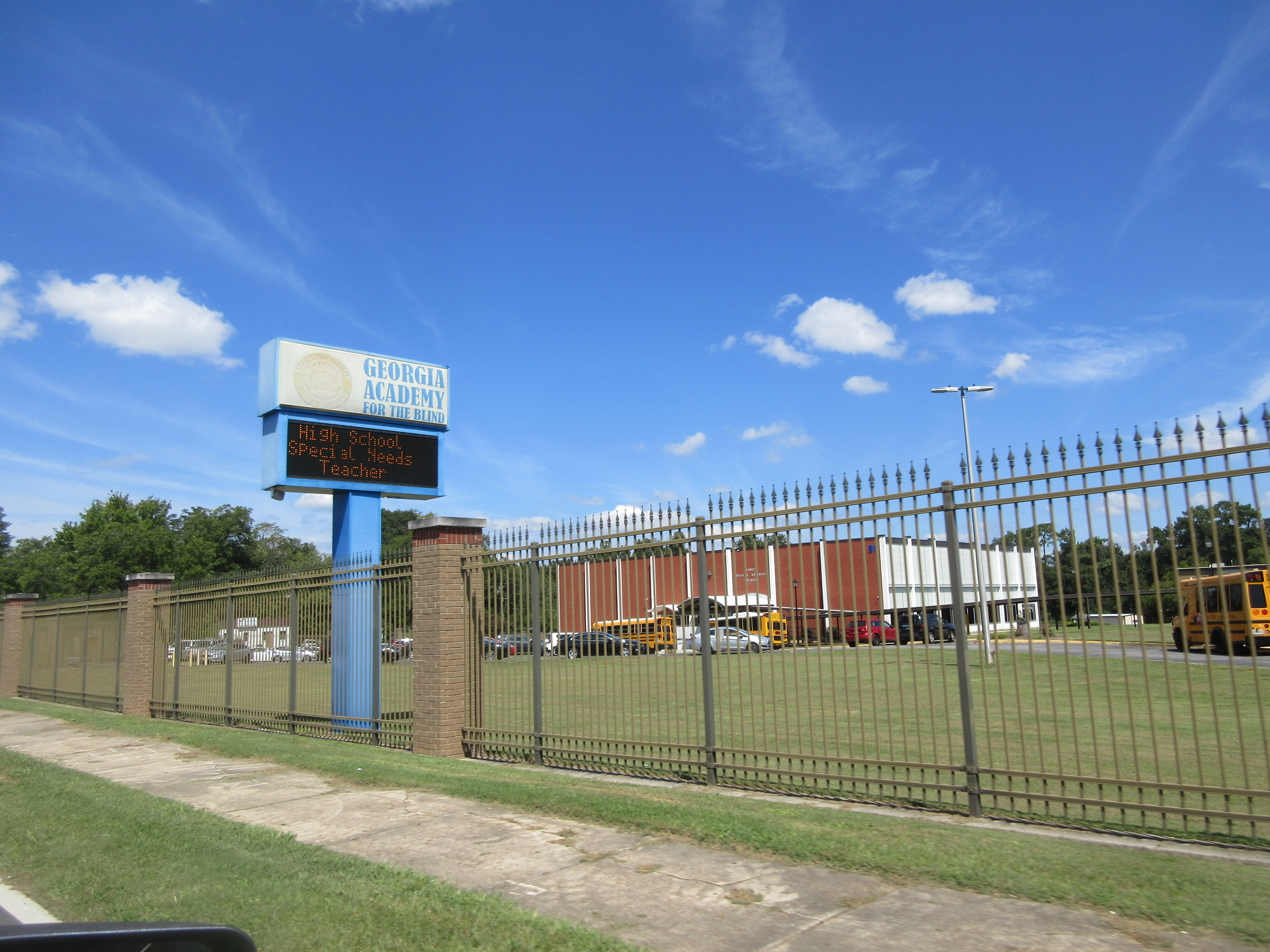
Campus

The school has dormitory facilities.

== Student body ==
Its student count ranged to 100 as of 2017. In 2009 it had 130 students with 70 boarders.

Prior to 2015 the school had a pep squad. In 2015 it added a competitive cheerleading squad.
