= DeKalb School of the Arts =

Public magnet school in Avondale Estates, Georgia

Location
- 1192 Clarendon Avenue; Avondale Estates, Georgia 30002; United States; 33°45′34″N 84°16′04″W

Information
- Type: Public magnet
- Motto: Where passion meets performance
- Established: 1999
- School district: DeKalb County School District
- Principal: Antonia Strong
- Faculty: 27
- Grades: 9–12
- Enrollment: 308 (2022-23)
- Student to teacher ratio: 14:1
- Campus: Suburban
- Colors: Purple and gold
- Mascot: A Fire Ant
- Nickname: DSA
- Accreditation: AdvancED/SACS
- National ranking: National rank: #284; state rank: #8; metro Atlanta rank: #5; school district rank: #1
- Newspaper: The Formicary
- Yearbook: The Spotlight
- Website: www.dsa.dekalb.k12.ga.us
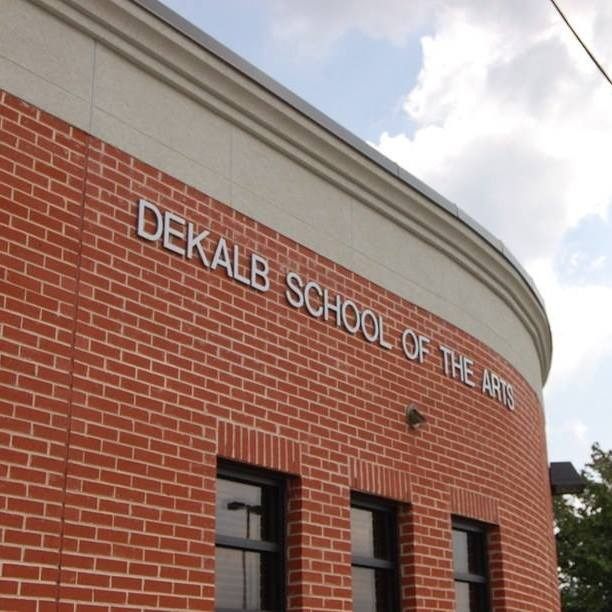

DeKalb School of the Arts (DSA) is a public performing arts magnet school in DeKalb County, Georgia, United States, east of the city of Atlanta. It is a part of the DeKalb County School District, as well as a member of the Arts Schools Network.

DeKalb School of the Arts is located at 1192 Clarendon Avenue, Avondale Estates, Georgia 30002.

== History ==
DeKalb School of the Arts began in 1985 under the direction of Richard Leitgeb and became the DeKalb Center for the Performing Arts, a magnet program housed at Avondale High School. In 1999 it was established as a separate entity and became the DeKalb School of the Arts, and in 2002 it moved into the former Briarcliff High School. After eight years at its independent location, DeKalb School of the Arts moved back into the Avondale High School building in August 2009. Since the closure of Avondale High School in 2011, DSA has occupied half of its old campus, sharing it with the DeKalb County School District's Registration, School Choice and Records departments. In the winter of 2020 the school district abruptly decided to drop the eighth grade class from DSA. Starting in August 2021 the school only has grades 9–12.

== Art curriculum ==
Every student at the school has a major and a minor. They must take three courses in their major and two courses in their minor. The arts majors are: creative writing, dance, drama, film & digital media, instrumental music (band and orchestra), tech theater, visual arts, and vocal music. In addition, students must earn twenty production credits every year through school performances or helping produce school performances.

== Academic achievements ==
- 2021: The College Board named DSA an AP Access and Support School, an AP Challenge School, an AP School of Distinction, and an AP Expansion School - qualifying in every category it was eligible for
- 2018-2021: Niche School Rankings consistently named DSA the Best High School for the Arts in Georgia
- 2017: U.S. News & World Report named DSA the #2 high school in the state, the #24 Magnet School in the country, and the #89 best high school nationally
- 2017: DSA received a Platinum Award for being a Highest Performing High School under Georgia's Single Statewide Accountability System from the Governor's Office of Student Achievement
- 2010-2017: Ranked in the top 700 US high school by The Washington Post High School Challenge
- 2005-2013: Ranked in the top 10 high schools in metro Atlanta by Atlanta Magazine in 2005, 2007, 2009, 2012, 2013
- 2010: The Georgia Public Policy Foundation ranked DSA as #2 of the best high schools in Georgia
- 2009: DSA is named a National Blue Ribbon School
- 2009: The Woodruff Arts Center named DSA as a Leader in Education
- 2007: Received a GRAMMY Foundation GRAMMY Signature School award

== Notable alumni ==
DeKalb Center for the Performing Arts 1985-1999

- 1991: Stacey Abrams – politician, lawyer, voting rights activist and author
- 1994: Omar Dorsey – movie actor

DeKalb School of the Arts 2000–present

- 2002: Donald Glover – writer, director, comedian, actor, rapper, record producer under the name Childish Gambino
- 2004: Lloyd – R&B singer
- 2007: Myles Grier – TV actor, producer, writer
- 2014: Yung Baby Tate – rapper, singer, and record producer

== Film location ==
- The interior of Madison High in Madison, Delaware from Goosebumps.
- Season 1 of CW's Black Lightning
- Eric Nuetzel Middle School and hospital scenes in Apple TV's series Me
- An NBC pilot episode coming out in 2023
