= Atlanta Area School for the Deaf =

Public school in Georgia, United States

Coordinates: 33°48′10″N 84°14′24″W

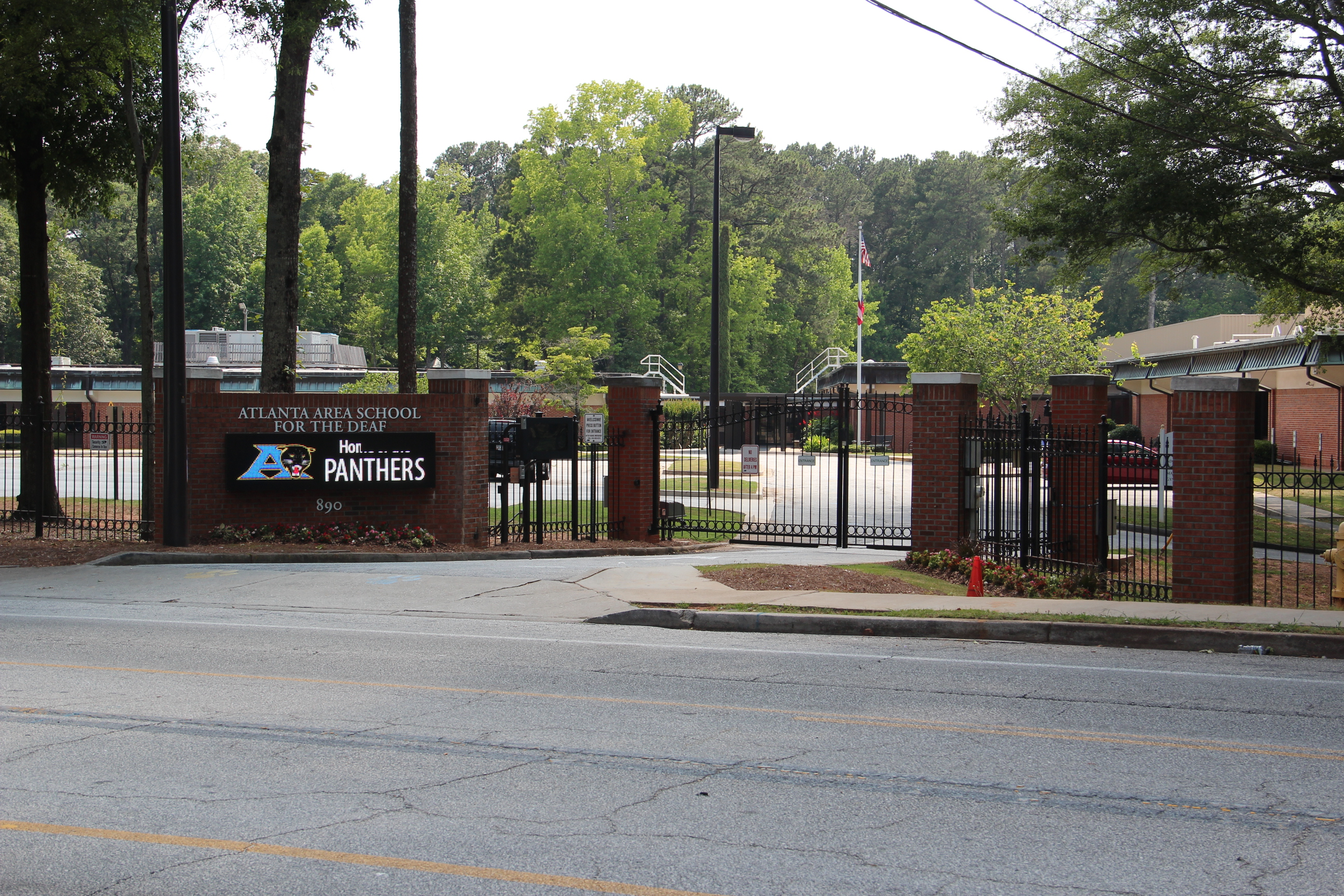
- Atlanta Area School for the Deaf front gates

Location
- 890 N Indian Creek Dr; Clarkston, Georgia; United States

Information
- Type: Public
- Established: 1972
- Superintendent: Jason Jack Johnson
- Grades: Pre-K–12
- Enrollment: 154
- Colors: Blue and Yellow
- Mascot: Panthers
- Website: aasdweb.com

Atlanta Area School for the Deaf (AASD) is a state-operated K–12 public school in Clarkston, Georgia. It provides full-day instructional services to infants, children, and youth who are deaf, including persons with multiple disabilities. The classroom programs range from preschool through twelfth grade. Students experience a range of academic, vocational, and social opportunities.

It is not a part of any school district.

== History ==
AASD was established in the 1970s. In 1979, Georgia State University professor of special education Dr. Glenn Vergason stated that because of the trend of "mainstreaming" deaf children into regular classes, which would mean less reliance on state-operated schools for the deaf, "I've had the feeling that the Atlanta Area School for the Deaf was built at the wrong time".

In 1990 there was a study headed by two employees of Gallaudet University that concluded that the Georgia Department of Education should do more to ensure more children were placed at Atlanta Area School for the Deaf and at the two other state schools for disabled children, Georgia School for the Deaf and Georgia Academy for the Blind, as all three were under-utilized.

== Admissions ==
As of 1980, in order for a student to attend, their home school district had to refer them to AASD.

== Student body ==
In 1979 the school served students from infancy to age 16, and had 250 students. In 1980 about 60 of the students lived in DeKalb County.

In 1990 the age range was 2 to 21 and there were 176 students, with about 50% disabled in some other way. The Atlanta Constitution stated "Hearing impaired preschoolers are particularly likely to attend the Area School, rather than a local one."

The school had 154 students from pre-K through 12th grade in the 2021–22 school year.

== Culture ==
An article from The Atlanta Constitution stated that parents felt protective of the school it provides "a world that is comprehensible though removed from the 'normal' setting."

== Curriculum ==
In 1979 the school had a total communication curriculum.

As of 1979, for students under age three, AASD had a program where parents have the education done in their residences.
