= Avondale Estates, Georgia =

- City
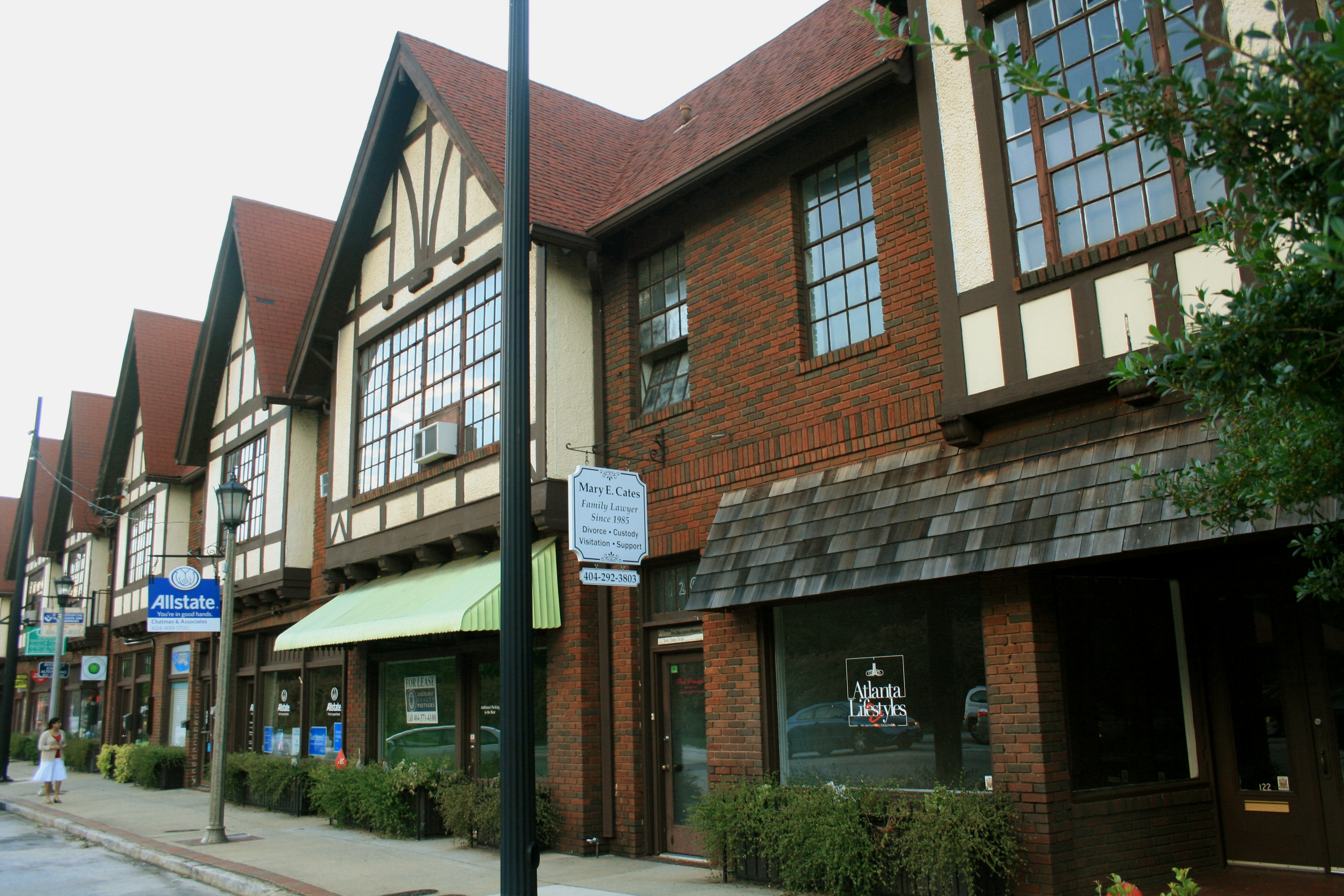
- Tudor Revival architecture strip mall 120 Avondale Road, Avondale Estates

- Seal

- Location in DeKalb County and the state of Georgia

- Location of Avondale Estates in Metro Atlanta
- Coordinates: 33°46′15″N 84°15′54″W
- Country: United States
- State: Georgia
- County: DeKalb

Government
  - Mayor: Jonathan Elmore

Area
  - Total: 1.24 sq mi (3.20 km^{2})
  - Land: 1.22 sq mi (3.17 km^{2})
  - Water: 0.012 sq mi (0.03 km^{2})
- Elevation: 1,027 ft (313 m)

Population (2020)
  - Total: 3,567
  - Density: 2,916.6/sq mi (1,126.11/km^{2})
- Time zone: UTC-5 (Eastern (EST))
  - Summer (DST): UTC-4 (EDT)
- ZIP code: 30002
- Area code: 404
- FIPS code: 13-04644
- GNIS feature ID: 0331075
- Website: avondaleestates.org

Avondale Estates is a city in DeKalb County, Georgia, United States. The population was 3,567 in 2020. It is part of the Atlanta metropolitan area and is near Decatur.

== History ==
In the 1890s, lots were sold in the area, which was known as Ingleside.

Avondale Estates was founded in 1924 by George Francis Willis, a patent medicine magnate, who purchased the entire village of Ingleside to create a planned community. The city was named after Stratford-upon-Avon, England, birthplace of Shakespeare. Downtown buildings were designed in a Tudor style to reinforce this image, as were many of the houses in the city. The city incorporated in 1927.

== Geography ==
Avondale Estates is entirely underlain by granite, and clay-rich soil developed on it. Some of this granite can be seen outcropped along the shore of Lake Avondale.

According to the United States Census Bureau, the city has a total area of 1.1 square miles (2.8 km^{2}), of which 0.88% is water.

== Demographics ==
Historical population
Census	Pop.	Note	%±
1930	535		—
1940	569		6.4%
1950	1,070		88.0%
1960	1,646		53.8%
1970	1,735		5.4%
1980	1,313		−24.3%
1990	2,209		68.2%
2000	2,609		18.1%
2010	2,960		13.5%
2020	3,567		20.5%
2025 (est.)	3,543	▼	−0.7%
U.S. Decennial Census; 2025

=== 2020 census ===
As of the 2020 census, Avondale Estates had a population of 3,567. The median age was 47.1 years. 19.8% of residents were under the age of 18 and 21.0% were 65 years of age or older. For every 100 females there were 83.2 males, and for every 100 females age 18 and over there were 76.8 males age 18 and over.

100.0% of residents lived in urban areas, while 0.0% lived in rural areas.

There were 1,618 households in Avondale Estates, including 865 family households. Of all households, 27.4% had children under the age of 18 living in them, 49.8% were married-couple households, 12.8% were households with a male householder and no spouse or partner present, and 30.3% were households with a female householder and no spouse or partner present. About 30.4% of all households were made up of individuals, and 13.5% had someone living alone who was 65 years of age or older.

There were 1,726 housing units, of which 6.3% were vacant. The homeowner vacancy rate was 1.1% and the rental vacancy rate was 11.5%.

Avondale Estates racial composition as of 2020
Race	Num.	Perc.
White (non-Hispanic)	2,781	77.96%
Black or African American (non-Hispanic)	339	9.5%
Native American	3	0.08%
Asian	101	2.83%
Pacific Islander	2	0.06%
Other/Mixed	198	5.55%
Hispanic or Latino	143	4.01%

== Arts and culture ==
The mostly Tudor-style downtown area of Avondale Estates, known as the commercial district, is home to a variety of businesses including consignment stores. Pizza, southern comfort food, and Chicago style hot dogs are some of the restaurant fare options within the city limits. The city is the location of the first Waffle House restaurant which opened on Labor Day weekend in 1955 having been converted into a museum, along with an existing operational full-time Waffle House nearby, with numerous others in the Decatur, Georgia area as well. The Avondale Salad, featured on certain Waffle House lunch menus, derives its name from the city.

A selection of art galleries and studios are located in an area of the city known as the Rail Arts District. Little Tree Art Studios located on Franklin Street, is a warehouse that includes multiple artist studios and a music rehearsal space.

The movie, Instant Family (2018), starring Mark Wahlberg, was filmed in Avondale Estates.

== Government ==
The city is governed by a mayor and a board of commissioners. Avondale Estates also has a city manager and other administrative positions. The city uses the DeKalb County Fire Service for fire and EMS calls, but provides its own police service.

The Avondale Estates Police Department (AEPD) has approximately 15 members providing around the clock coverage. Officers drive Dodge Chargers equipped with PIT bumpers, LED lights, in-car computers with e-tickets, and digital video cameras. City Court is held multiple times a month.

The Georgia Department of Juvenile Justice has its headquarters in Avondale Estates.

The United States Postal Service operates the Avondale Estates Post Office.

== Education ==
Avondale Estates is served by the DeKalb County School System.

Avondale Elementary School is in the city limits. Druid Hills Middle School, and Druid Hills High School serve the community.

Avondale Middle School and Avondale High School, formerly adjacent to the city limits and serving the city, closed at the end of May 2011, and the students were distributed to neighboring schools. The campus is now used exclusively by the magnet school DeKalb School of the Arts.

In 2008, local parents began organizing formal efforts through the Avondale Education Association, a local grass-roots non-profit organization that was founded in October 2003, to create a charter school that would achieve the standards required by law, while establishing an elementary school that reflected the values of the community. Their proposal was initially rejected by the Dekalb County School Board, but it was subsequently selected by the Georgia Charter Schools Commission as one of a small number of schools to be chartered directly by the State of Georgia. The school, Museum School of Avondale Estates, opened in 2010, and Avondale Estates therefore lies within its attendance zone. The Museum School admissions are accepted through a lottery.
