= DeKalb County School District =

Public school district in Georgia, United States

Coordinates: 33°49′57″N 84°11′43″W

Address
- 1701 Mountain Industrial Boulevard Stone Mountain, Georgia, 30083; United States

District information
- Type: Suburban/urban public
- Grades: Pre-kindergarten – 12
- Established: 1873
- Superintendent: Norman Sauce
- Accreditation: AdvancED
- Schools: 129
- Budget: $1.097 billion
- NCES District ID: 1301740

Students and staff
- Students: 91,752 (2024–25)
- Teachers: 6,745.90 (on an FTE basis)
- Staff: 6,434.70 (FTE)
- Student–teacher ratio: 13.60

Other information
- Telephone: (678) 676-1200
- Website: dekalbschoolsga.org

The DeKalb County School District (DCSD) is a school district headquartered at 1701 Mountain Industrial Boulevard in unincorporated DeKalb County, Georgia, United States, near Stone Mountain and in the Atlanta metropolitan area. DCSD operates public schools in areas of DeKalb County that are not within the city limits of Atlanta and Decatur. It served a portion of Atlanta annexed by that city in 2018 until 2024, when that portion was re-assigned to Atlanta Public Schools (APS).

The school district is overseen by the seven-member DeKalb County Board of Education. The superintendent/CEO is, as of June 8, 2024, Dr. Devon Q. Horton. The system educates more than 102,000 students at 138 schools with more than 14,000 full-time employees and 6,000 teachers. In 2018, the school system graduated over 5,800 students from high school.

The district includes three of the top-ranked schools in the nation in 2018 according to U.S. News & World Report. The DeKalb School of the Arts earned a gold designation after being ranked No. 75 overall, and No. 2 in Georgia. Chamblee Charter High School also earned a gold designation, ranking No. 457 nationwide and No. 14 in Georgia. The Arabia Mountain High School Academy of Engineering-Medicine performed well enough to earn a silver designation, ranking No. 58 in Georgia. DeKalb Early College Academy earned a bronze designation, ranking No. 68 in Georgia.

DCSD is also home to Henderson Mill Elementary School, the first STEAM (Science, Technology, Engineering, Arts and Math) certified school in Georgia.

== History ==
=== Accreditation ===
In 2017, the DeKalb County School District received a full, five-year renewal of its accreditation from AdvancED, through 2022. The renewal comes after the district regained full accreditation in 2016.

On December 17, 2012, the Southern Association of Colleges and Schools announced that it had downgraded the DeKalb County School District's status from "on advisement" to "on probation" and warned the school system that the loss of their accreditation was "imminent."

On January 21, 2014, the Southern Association of Colleges and Schools announced that it had upgraded the DeKalb County School District's status from "probation" to "accredited warned" which is below full accreditation status.

=== Academic Achievement ===
In 2017, the DCSD College and Career Ready Performance Index (CCRPI) score increased to 70, up from 66 in 2016. Since 2016, the CCRPI score for elementary schools increased five points; middle schools increased three points; and high schools increased nearly one full point.

In 2017, more than 2,500 students in DCSD took the ACT, earning a composite score of 19.8, compared to last year's composite score of 19.4. That same year, more than 3,500 students took the SAT; the district's total composite score continues to improve year-over-year. DeKalb's 2017 total mean score for the SAT was 980.

The four-year graduation rate for DCSD's Class of 2017 was 74 percent, a four-point increase from the 2016 graduation rate of 70 percent. Between 2013 and 2017, the District graduation rate improved 14 percentage points.

Indictment

Former DeKalb County Schools Superintendent Crawford Lewis was indicted in 2012, along with former DeKalb County Schools Chief Operating Officer Pat Pope (Reed), and others, on criminal charges related to a school construction scandal. The indictment listed four counts of racketeering, as well as theft by taking and bribery.

On October 15, 2025 the DeKalb County Board of Education voted to accept the resignation of Superintendent Devon Horton who had been serving since 2023. An indictment accusing him of offering district contracts in the Evanston-Skokie School District 65 outside of Chicago to his friends, then receiving about $85,000 in kickbacks from the contracts between 2020 and 2023 triggered the vote and subsequent resignation.

=== Shooting and hostage situation ===
On August 20, 2013, 20-year-old Michael Brandon Hill, who was armed with an AK-47, entered the front office of Ronald E. McNair Discovery Learning Academy, an elementary school, and barricaded himself. He fired six shots at police officers outside, who returned fire. The school's students were evacuated. Antoinette Tuff, a school bookkeeper, was able to convince Hill to surrender without further violence. Tuff was later praised by President Barack Obama for her courage and calmness in defusing the situation. Hill later pleaded guilty to 13 counts, including aggravated assault, false imprisonment, making terroristic threats, and burglary, and was sentenced to 20 years in prison.

=== Bus drivers' strike ===
From April 19–23, 2018 nearly 400 school bus drivers for the district participated in a strike over low pay and little employee benefits. Inspired in part by the concurrent nationwide teacher strikes in states such as West Virginia, Oklahoma and Arizona, bus drivers for the district planned a "sick-out". About 42 percent of bus drivers in the county participated, causing nearly 60-90 minute delays in students being picked up for school. As a right-to-work state, public sector employees are prohibited in Georgia from striking. The strike resulted in at least 7 bus drivers, particularly ones who helped organize the strike, being terminated of employment.

=== Emory and CDC annexation by Atlanta ===
The City of Atlanta, in 2017, agreed to annex territory in DeKalb County, including the Centers for Disease Control and Emory University, effective January 1, 2018. In 2016 Emory University made a statement that "Annexation of Emory into the City of Atlanta will not change school districts, since neighboring communities like Druid Hills will still be self-determining regarding annexation." By 2017 the city agreed to include the annexed area in the boundaries of Atlanta Public Schools (APS), a move decried by the leadership of the DeKalb county district as it would take taxable property away from that district. In 2017 the number of children living in the annexed territory who attended public schools was nine. The area ultimately went to APS, and as part of a 2019 settlement Emory would help establish school-based clinics for DeKalb schools. Students will be rezoned to APS effective 2024; they were zoned to DeKalb schools before then.

== Schools and centers ==
=== Elementary schools ===
Zoned

- Allgood Elementary School (1955)
- Ashford Park Elementary (1955)
- Austin Elementary School (Dunwoody) (1975)
- Avondale Elementary School (Avondale Estates) (1953)
- Barack H. Obama Elementary Magnet School of Technology (2017) Opened, January, 2017 at the site of the former Clifton Elementary School
- Bob Mathis Elementary School (1975)
- Bouie Elementary (1996)
- Briar Vista Elementary (1955)
- Briarlake Elementary (unincorporated) (1957)
  - In 1980 it had an oral communication program for deaf students. That year it had one speech therapist and three interpreters, with three classrooms dedicated to the program.
- Brockett Elementary (1961)
- Browns Mill Elementary School (unincorporated) (1990)
- Canby Lane Elementary (1967)
- Murphey Candler Elementary School (unincorporated) (1969)
- Cedar Grove Elementary (1975)
- Chapel Hill Elementary (1967)
- Chesnut Charter Elementary School (Dunwoody) (formerly Chesnut Elementary, 1969-1999, became charter in 2000)
- Clifton Elementary (Demolished and rebuilt as Barack H. Obama Elementary Magnet School of Technology)
- Columbia Elementary (1961)
- Doraville United Elementary School (2022)
- Dresden Elementary School (unincorporated) (1963)
- Dunaire Elementary School (1967)
- Dunwoody Elementary (Dunwoody) (2009)
- Eldridge Miller Elementary (1981) (formerly Mainstreet Elementary)
- Evansdale Elementary School (unincorporated) (1967)
- Fairington Elementary (1975)
- Fernbank Elementary (1958/2015)
- Flat Rock Elementary (2007)
- Flat Shoals Elementary (1966)
- Hambrick Elementary (1971)
- Narvie Harris Elementary School (1998)
- Hawthorne Elementary (1961)
- Henderson Mill Elementary (1965)
- Hightower Elementary School (Doraville) (1958)
- Huntley Hills Elementary & Montessori School (unincorporated) (1964)
- Idlewood Elementary (1967)
- Indian Creek Elementary (1961)
- Jolly Elementary School (unincorporated, east of Clarkston, opened 1968)
- John Robert Lewis Elementary School
- Kelley Lake Elementary (1963)
- Kingsley Elementary School (Dunwoody) (1971)
- Kittredge Magnet School for High Achievers
- Knollwood Elementary (1955)
- Laurel Ridge Elementary (1958)
- Livsey Elementary (1971)
- Marbut Elementary Traditional Theme School (unincorporated) (1994)
- McLendon Elementary (1958)
- Ronald E. McNair Discovery Learning Academy (2008)
- Meadowview Elementary (1961)
- Midvale Elementary (1961)
- Montclair Elementary (1967)
- Montgomery Elementary (1963)
- Murphy Candler Elementary (????)
- The Museum School of Avondale Estates (2010)
- Oak Grove Elementary (1958)
- Oak View Elementary (2004)
- Panola Way Elementary School (unincorporated) (1987)
- Peachcrest Elementary (1961-2011)
- Pine Ridge Elementary (1988)
- Pleasantdale Elementary School (unincorporated) (1968)
- Princeton Elementary (2007)
- Rainbow Elementary (1970)
- Redan Elementary (1935)
- Cary Reynolds Elementary School (Doraville) (Sequoyah Elementary School 1961-1963 name change)
- Rock Chapel Elementary School (unincorporated) (1969)
- Rockbridge Elementary School (unincorporated) (1972)
- Rowland Elementary (1967)
- Sagamore Hills Elementary (1961)
- Shadow Rock Elementary (1991)
- Robert Shaw Theme School (Robert Shaw Elementary 1955-1969)
- Sky Haven Elementary
- Smoke Rise Elementary (1969)
- Snapfinger Elementary (1964)
- Stone Mill Elementary (1975)
- Stone Mountain Elementary School (1954)
- Stoneview Elementary School (unincorporated, southwest of Lithonia) (1963)
- Terry Mill Elementary (1958-1998) (currently the Dekalb Elementary School of the Arts)
- Toney Elementary (1953)
- Vanderlyn Elementary School (Dunwoody) (1973)
- Wadsworth Elementary (1958-2000 currently Wadsworth Magnet School)
- Woodridge Elementary (1975)
- Woodward Elementary (1961)
- Wynbrooke Elementary (2001)

Optional

- DeKalb Elementary School of the Arts (2002)
- Oakcliff Traditional Theme School (unincorporated)
- Oakcliff Traditional Theme School (as of 1993, formerly Oakcliff Elementary) (1964)

=== Middle schools ===
Zoned

- Mary McLeod Bethune Middle School (unincorporated)
- Cedar Grove Middle School (unincorporated)
- Chamblee Middle School (Chamblee) (1997)
- Chapel Hill Middle School (unincorporated)
- Columbia Middle School (unincorporated)
- Druid Hills Middle School (Shamrock Middle School 1996-2011) (unincorporated)
- Freedom Middle School (unincorporated, opened January 8, 2001)
- Henderson Middle School (unincorporated)
- Lithonia Middle School (Lithonia)
- Ronald McNair Sr. Middle School (unincorporated)
- Miller Grove Middle School (unincorporated)
- Peachtree Charter Middle School (Dunwoody)
- Redan Middle School (unincorporated) (2003)
- Salem Middle School (unincorporated)
- Sequoyah Middle School (Doraville)(1989)
- Stephenson Middle School (unincorporated) (1996)
- Stone Mountain Middle School (unincorporated, west of Stone Mountain)
- Tucker Middle School (unincorporated) (2004)

Optional

- The Champion School: a Traditional Theme School (Stone Mountain)

=== High schools ===
Zoned

- Cedar Grove High School (unincorporated)
- Chamblee Charter High School (Chamblee)
- Clarkston High School (unincorporated, south of City of Clarkston)
- Columbia High School (unincorporated)
- Cross Keys High School (Brookhaven, formerly unincorporated) (1957)
- Druid Hills High School (1918/unincorporated)
- Dunwoody High School (Dunwoody)
- Martin Luther King Jr. High School (unincorporated)
- Lakeside High School (unincorporated)
- Lithonia High School (unincorporated, west of the city of Lithonia, formerly within city limits)
- Ronald McNair Sr. High School (unincorporated)
- Miller Grove High School (unincorporated)
- Redan High School (unincorporated) (1976)
- Southwest DeKalb High School (unincorporated)
- Stephenson High School (unincorporated)
- Stone Mountain High School (unincorporated, west of the city of Stone Mountain) (1976)
- Towers High School (unincorporated)
- Tucker High School (Tucker) (1918, current location 1955)

Optional

- Arabia Mountain High School
- DeKalb School of the Arts (unincorporated)
- Elizabeth Andrews High School (unincorporated)

=== Centers ===
Alternative

- The Jim Cherry Teacher Center (now part of the Georgia Learning Resources System (GLRS), Metro East Center)
- Coralwood Diagnostic Center (unincorporated)
- Dekalb Agriculture Technology & Environment, Inc.
- DeKalb Alternative School (unincorporated)
- DeKalb Early College Academy (unincorporated, south of the city of Stone Mountain)
- DeKalb High School of Technology - North (within the new city limits of Dunwoody, est. December 1, 2008)
- DeKalb High School of Technology - South (unincorporated, southeast of the city of Decatur)
- DeKalb School of the Arts (1999)
- DeKalb Path Academy
- DeKalb Preparatory Academy
- Eagle Woods Academy
- Early Learning Center
- Fernbank Science Center (unincorporated)
- Flex Academy (Opened January 5, 2017 and located within the William Bradley Bryant Center for Technology)
- Globe Academy
- Margaret Harris Comprehensive School (unincorporated, previously the Margaret Harris High School for Exceptional Children)
- International Student Center (unincorporated)
- International Community School
- Leadership Academy Preparatory Academy
- Shadow Rock Center (unincorporated, south of the city of Lithonia)
- Tapestry Public Charter School
- The Champion School
- Warren Technical Center (unincorporated, east of the city of Chamblee, formerly Warren Elementary School)

=== Partnerships ===
- Children's Healthcare of Atlanta

== Former schools ==
=== Elementary schools ===
- Atherton Elementary (1964-2011)
- Brookhaven Elementary School 1948-1975 (DeKalb Public Library, North Druid Hills branch annex 1976-1985, Brookhaven Boys' and Girls' Club 1985-2017.property sold for residential development demolished 2018)
- Jim Cherry Elementary School 1949-1975 (North Dekalb Mental Health Center, 1976-1988, Seigakuin International Japanese School 1990-2003, PATH Academy charter school 2005-current)
- Forrest Hills Elementary School, 1954-2004 (The Museum School of Avondale Estates Charter School 2012-current)
- Glen Haven Elementary (1943-2011) Current home of DeKalb Preparatory Academy Charter School
- Gresham Park Elementary (1958-2011) Demolished in 2014
- Margaret Harris Elementary School, 1967-1988 (currently Margaret Harris Comprehensive School)
- Heritage Elementary School, 1968-1999 (Heritage School 2000-2010, Globe Academy Charter 2013-current)
- Hooper Alexander Elementary School, 1935-2008 (building destroyed by fire January 2014)
- Kittredge Elementary School 1958-1975 (4th-7th grades only 1969-1974, Special needs/Disabled students K-7 1970-1974, Open Campus West High School 1975-1988, Kittredge Magnet School 1989-2008, International Student Center 2008-2012, John R. Lewis Elementary 2014-2022, Property vacant For Sale as of 2026)
- Medlock Elementary School, 1951-2011 (The International Community Charter School private academy, ten-year lease for the building 2012-current)
- Midway Elementary (1958-2015) Currently houses International Community Charter School
- Nancy Creek Elementary School, 1970-2008 (Kittredge Magnet School 2008-current)
- Northwoods Elementary School 1954-1984 (Yeshivah Hebrew Orthodox High School 1986-2016 Currently home of Tapestry Charter School)
- Oakcliff Elementary, 1964-1993 (Oakcliff Traditional Theme School, 1993-current)
- Rehoboth Elementary School, 1963-1979 (Dekalb Schools employee training and records center 1980-1998, The William Bradley Bryant Center, 1999-current)
- Sexton Woods Elementary
- Shallowford Elementary School, 1968-1997 (Chamblee Middle School 1997-2006, demolished in July 2014)
- Robert Shaw Elementary School, 1955-1969 (Robert Shaw student Diagnostic Testing and Instructional center 1970-1997, Robert Shaw Theme School 1998-current)
- Sky Haven Elementary (1955-2011) (property held/maintained/storage for school system's possible future reuse (2011-2016), Property sold demolished summer 2016)
- Skyland Elementary School 1948-1989 (Georgia Dept. of Human Resources, Center for Vital Records 1991-2017, Current site of John R. Lewis Elementary School 2022-)
- Leslie J. Steele Elementary School, 1951-2006 (demolished and site reconstructed as Ronald E. McNair Discovery Learning Academy 2008)
- W.D. Thomson Elementary School, 1939-1975 (demolished 1976)
- Tilson Elementary (1958-2008) Demolished in 2014
- Tucker Elementary School, 1955-1983 (Tucker Recreation Center, 1985-current)
- Wesley Chapel Elementary School, 1953-1979 (currently Dekalb Transition Academy, since 1990) Demolished in 2016

=== Middle schools ===
- Avondale Middle School (unincorporated, adjacent to the city of Avondale Estates), 2000-2011 (housed Fernbank Elementary School, 2013–2015) Currently undergoing renovations to become Performing Arts School

=== High schools ===
- Avondale High School (unincorporated, adjacent to the city of Avondale Estates) 1955-2011 Part of building has been converted to records storage. Other portion houses DeKalb School of the Arts.
- Briarcliff High School, 1962-1987 ( 1988-2008 Dekalb School of the Arts and Open Campus High School, demolished summer 2018)
- Bruce Street High School, 1938-1968
- John B. Gordon High School, 1959-1986 (Became Ronald E. McNair Middle School)
- Hamilton High School, 1924-1969 a school for African Americans, currently Hamilton Recreation Center
- Henderson High School 1970-1996 (currently Henderson Middle School)
- Peachtree High School, 1968-1988 (Peachtree Jr High School 1988-2002; demolished, site reconstructed as Peachtree Charter Middle School 2008)
- Sequoyah High School 1965-1988,(currently Sequoyah Middle School)
- Shamrock High School, 1967-1996 (Shamrock Middle School 1996-2011, name changed to Druid Hills Middle School 2011-current)
- Walker High School, 1966-1987 (Renamed Ronald E. McNair High School)

Centers:

- DeKalb Transition Academy (formerly Wesley Chapel Elementary School) Building was demolished in 2016
- Destiny Academy of Excellence, 2007-2018 (unincorporated)

== District facilities ==
- Administrative and Instructional Complex (unincorporated area near Stone Mountain) — The building complex was originally built as an American Fare. After this closed, DeKalb County School District bought the property. The district renovated the original building, converting commercial spaces into educational and office spaces. The building served for a short time as the district's alternative high school before becoming the Administrative and Instructional Complex.
- The William Bradley Bryant Center (unincorporated area near Decatur)
- East DeKalb Campus (unincorporated area near Stone Mountain)
- Sam Moss Service Center(1975) District Logistics Distribution and Storage. District Facilities and Grounds Maintenance. District Transportation Pool and Servicing facilities. (unincorporated area near Tucker)

== Athletics ==
The district offers 17 athletic programs and earned 253 state championships dating back to 1938; the majority of the titles came from track and field and wrestling. The county provides five athletic stadiums:

Stadium	Year constructed	Seating capacity	Location	Additional information
Adams Stadium	1962	6,500 (one side of field)	Unincorporated - adjacent to the old Briarcliff High School building	Renovated summer 2016
Avondale Stadium	1958	6,500 (one side of field)	Unincorporated - adjacent to City of Avondale Estates	
James R. Hallford Stadium	1968	15,600 (both sides of field)	Unincorporated - adjacent to City of Clarkston and the Clarkston Campus of Georgia State University Perimeter College	Formerly named Memorial Stadium.
North DeKalb Stadium	1962	6,500 (one side of field)	Within the city limits of Chamblee	
William "Buck" Godfrey Stadium	1968	8,500	Unincorporated - adjacent to the Georgia State University Perimeter College Decatur Campus	Formerly named Panthersville Stadium

== See also ==
- Fernbank Science Center
