= Atkinson County School District =

School district in Georgia (U.S. state)

Address
- 98 East Roberts Avenue Pearson, Georgia, 31642; United States
- Coordinates: 31.295671°N 82.851461°W

District information
- Grades: PreK-12
- Superintendent: Dr. Melissa Wilbanks
- Accreditations: Southern Association of Colleges and Schools; Georgia Accrediting Commission
- NCES District ID: 1300090

Students and staff
- Enrollment: 1,648
- Faculty: 102

Other information
- Telephone: (912) 422-7373
- Fax: (912) 422-7369
- Website: www.atkinson.k12.ga.us

The Atkinson County School District is a public school district in Atkinson County, Georgia, United States, based in Pearson. It serves the communities of Pearson and Willacoochee.

== Schools ==
The Atkinson County School District has two elementary schools, one middle school, and one high school.

=== Elementary schools ===
- Pearson Elementary School
- Willacoochee Elementary School

=== Middle school ===
- Atkinson County Middle School

=== High school ===
- Atkinson County High School
