= National Register of Historic Places listings in Atkinson County, Georgia =

This is a list of properties and districts in Atkinson County, Georgia that are listed on the National Register of Historic Places (NRHP).

This National Park Service list is complete through NPS recent listings posted March 21, 2025.

== Current listings ==
	Name on the Register	Image	Date listed	Location	City or town	Description
1	Atkinson County Courthouse	Atkinson County Courthouse	September 18, 1980 (#80000966)	Austin at Main St. 31°17′47″N 82°51′12″W	Pearson	
2	McCranie's Turpentine Still	McCranie's Turpentine Still	June 28, 1976 (#76000608)	W of Willacoochee on U.S. 82; 31°20′49″N 83°03′46″W	Willacoochee	
