= Atkinson County High School =

School in Georgia, United States

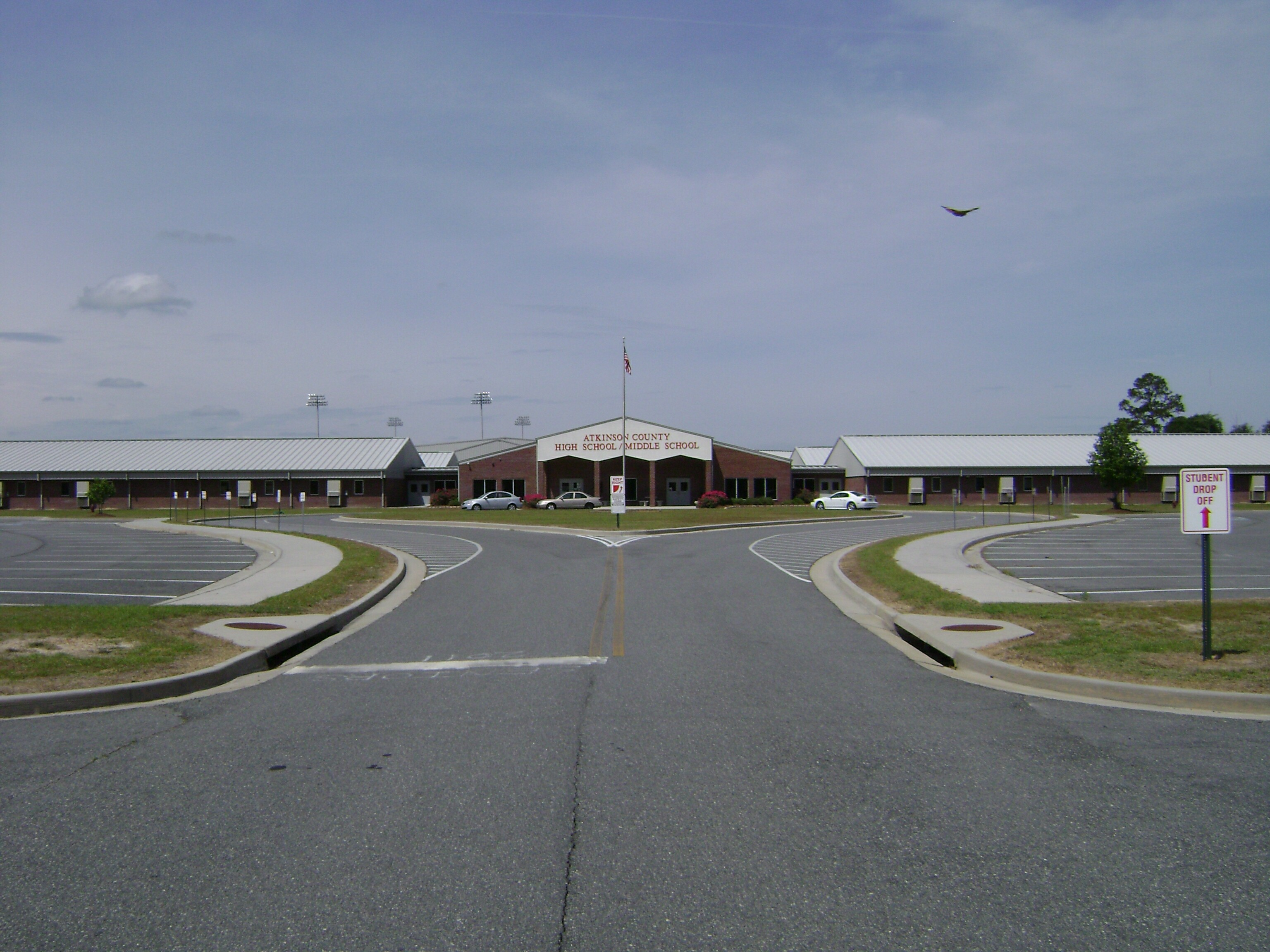

Location
- 145 Rebel Lane; Pearson address, Atkinson County, Georgia 31642; United States; 31°19′16″N 82°50′53″W

Information
- Superintendent: Melissa Wilbanks
- CEEB code: 112365
- Principal: Jill Griffis
- Staff: 32.40 (FTE)
- Enrollment: 447 (2024-2025)
- Student to teacher ratio: 13.80
- Colors: Red, gray and white
- Athletics conference: GHSA Class A Division 2 Region 2
- Mascot: Rebels
- Rival: Clinch County High School
- Website: achs.atkinson.k12.ga.us

Atkinson County High School is located in unincorporated Atkinson County, Georgia, United States, with a Pearson postal address. It is the only high school in the Atkinson County School District. Its teams are known as the Rebels and the school colors are red, gray and white. It shares a campus with its feeder school, Atkinson County Middle School. It is at 145 Rebel Lane in Pearson, Georgia.

In 2026, the school had about 450 students in grades 9 to 12. About 46 percent of students were Hispanic, 35 percent White, and 17 percent Black. Tests scores in reading and math were above state averages and about 80 percent of students were from families categorized as economically disadvantaged.

Pearson is athletic phenom Tyreek Hill's hometown and he was a freshman at the school when his family decided to switch him to Coffee High School for better exposure.
