= Atkinson County Courthouse =

- U.S. National Register of Historic Places
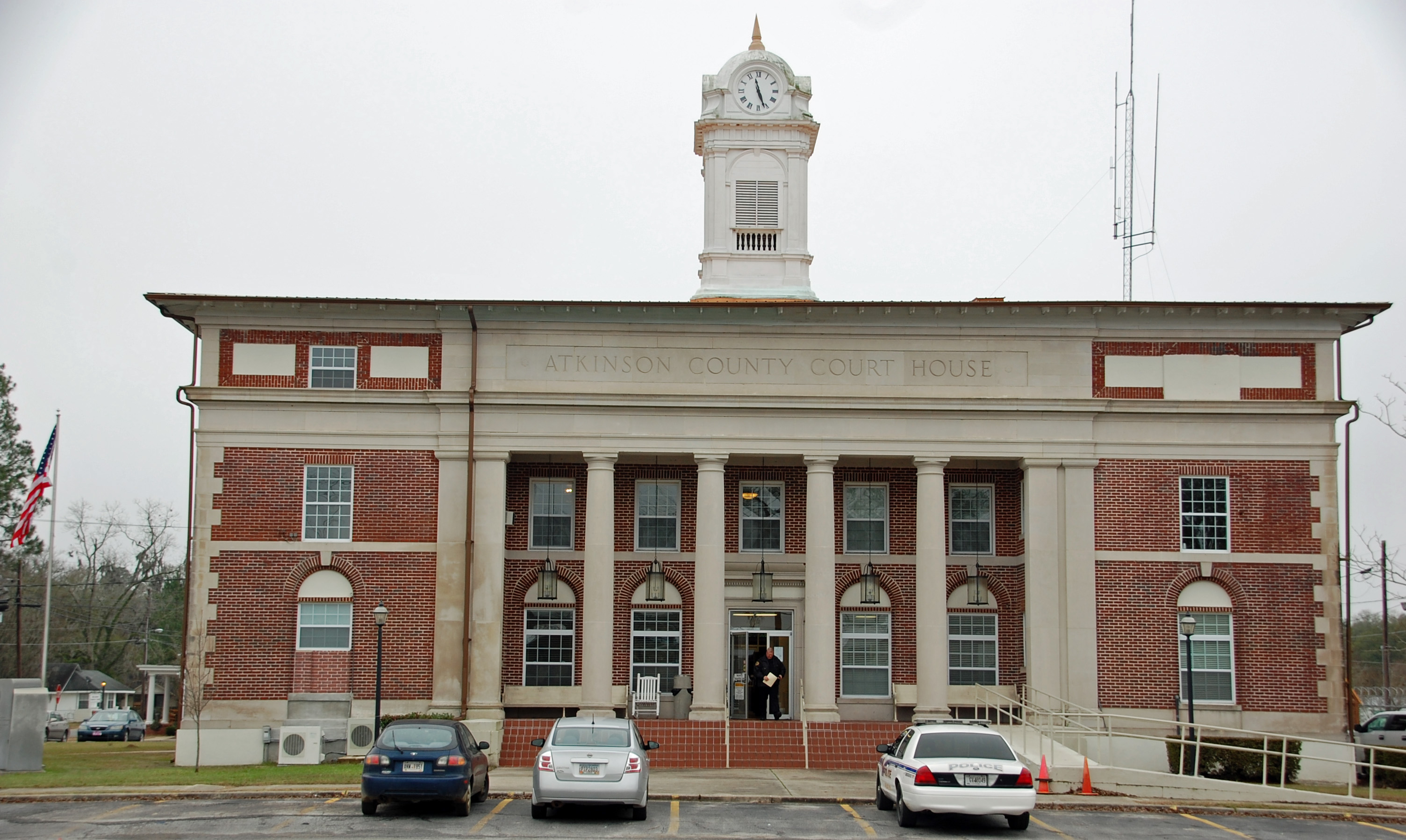

- Location within Georgia Location within the United States
- Location: W Austin Ave at S Main St., Pearson, Georgia
- Coordinates: 31°17′50″N 82°51′11″W
- Area: less than one acre
- Built: 1920
- Built by: Holly Construction Co.
- Architect: Baldwin, J.J.
- Architectural style: Classical Revival
- MPS: Georgia County Courthouses TR
- NRHP reference No.: 80000966
- Added to NRHP: September 18, 1980

The Atkinson County Courthouse is a historic county courthouse in Pearson, Atkinson County, Georgia. It was designed by J.J. Baldwin and built in 1920. It was added to the National Register of Historic Places on September 18, 1980. It was remodeled in the 1980s. It is located at West Austin Avenue and South Main Street.

== See also ==
- National Register of Historic Places listings in Atkinson County, Georgia
