= McCranie's Turpentine Still =

Historic place in Georgia, US

- U.S. National Register of Historic Places
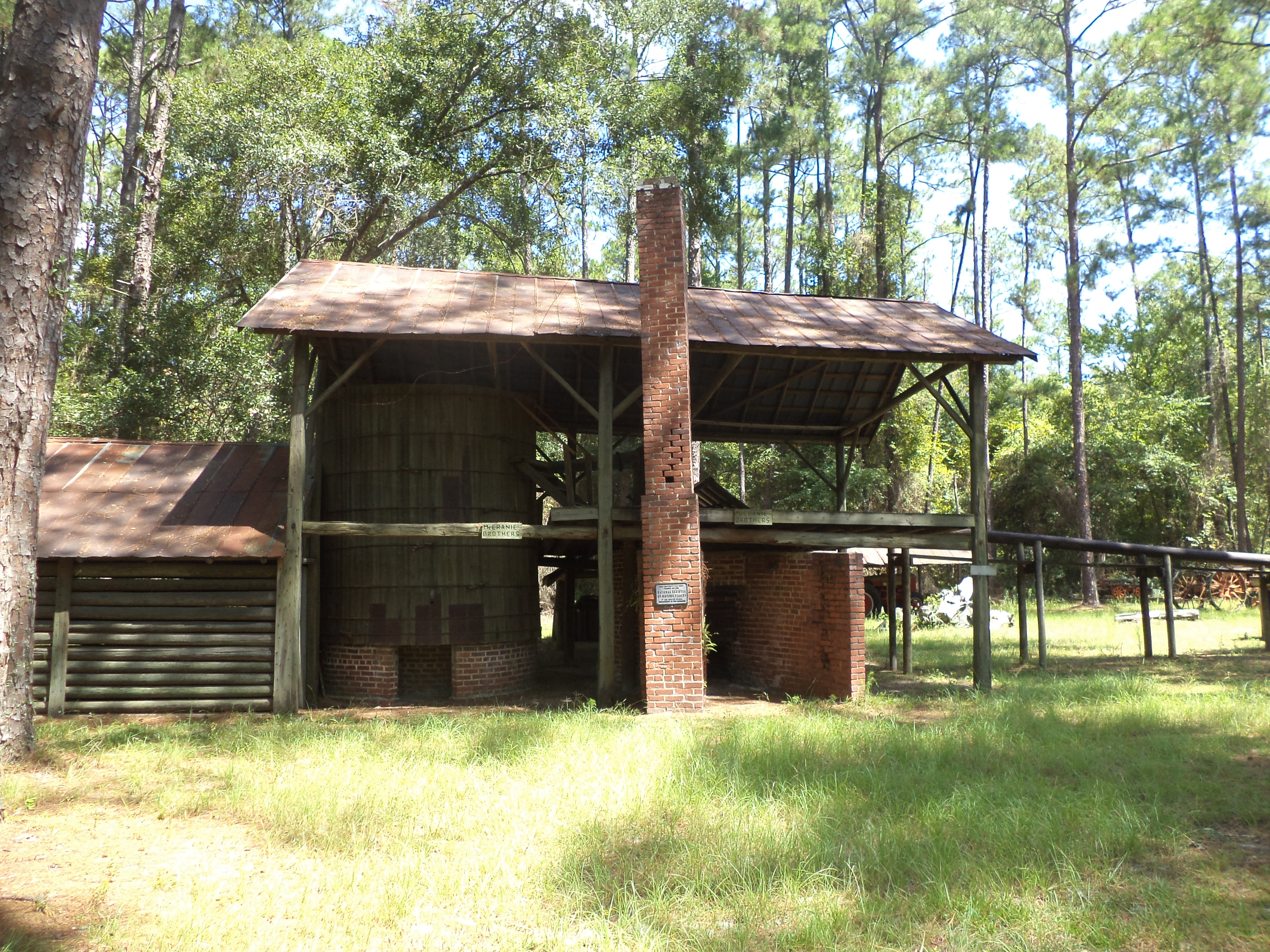

- Location within Georgia Location within the United States
- Nearest city: Willacoochee, Georgia
- Coordinates: 31°20′49″N 83°03′46″W
- Area: 60 acres (24 ha)
- Built: 1936; 90 years ago
- Architect: George McCranie, et al.
- Architectural style: Log construction
- NRHP reference No.: 76000608
- Added to NRHP: June 28, 1976

McCranie's Turpentine Still is a historic site in Willacoochee, Georgia. It was added to the National Register of Historic Places on June 28, 1976. It is located west of Willacoochee on U.S. 82.

== History ==
The McCranie family worked in the turpentine industry prior to 1900 and continued for generations. This turpentine still was built in 1936, based on designs and methods from earlier eras. It was operated by three McCranie brothers. It ceased operation in 1942 when the two elder McCranie brothers went to war. The replacement of the fire distillation process by steam distillation and the labor shortage caused by World War II contributed to its closure. The still remains largely intact.

In 2026 it was added to the Georgia Trust for Historic Preservation list of "Places in Peril", because of damage from Hurricane Helene.

== Photos ==
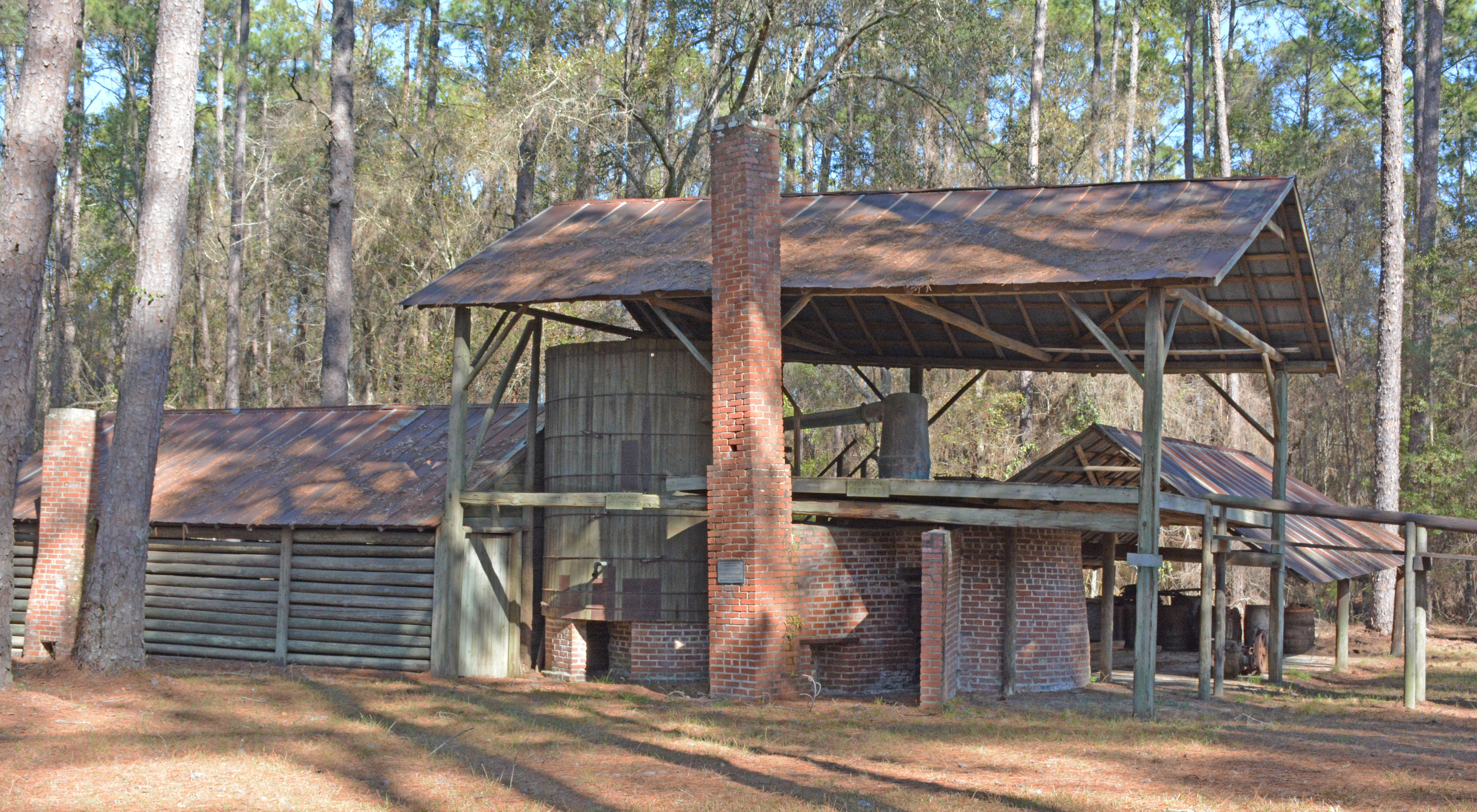
The still in 2015

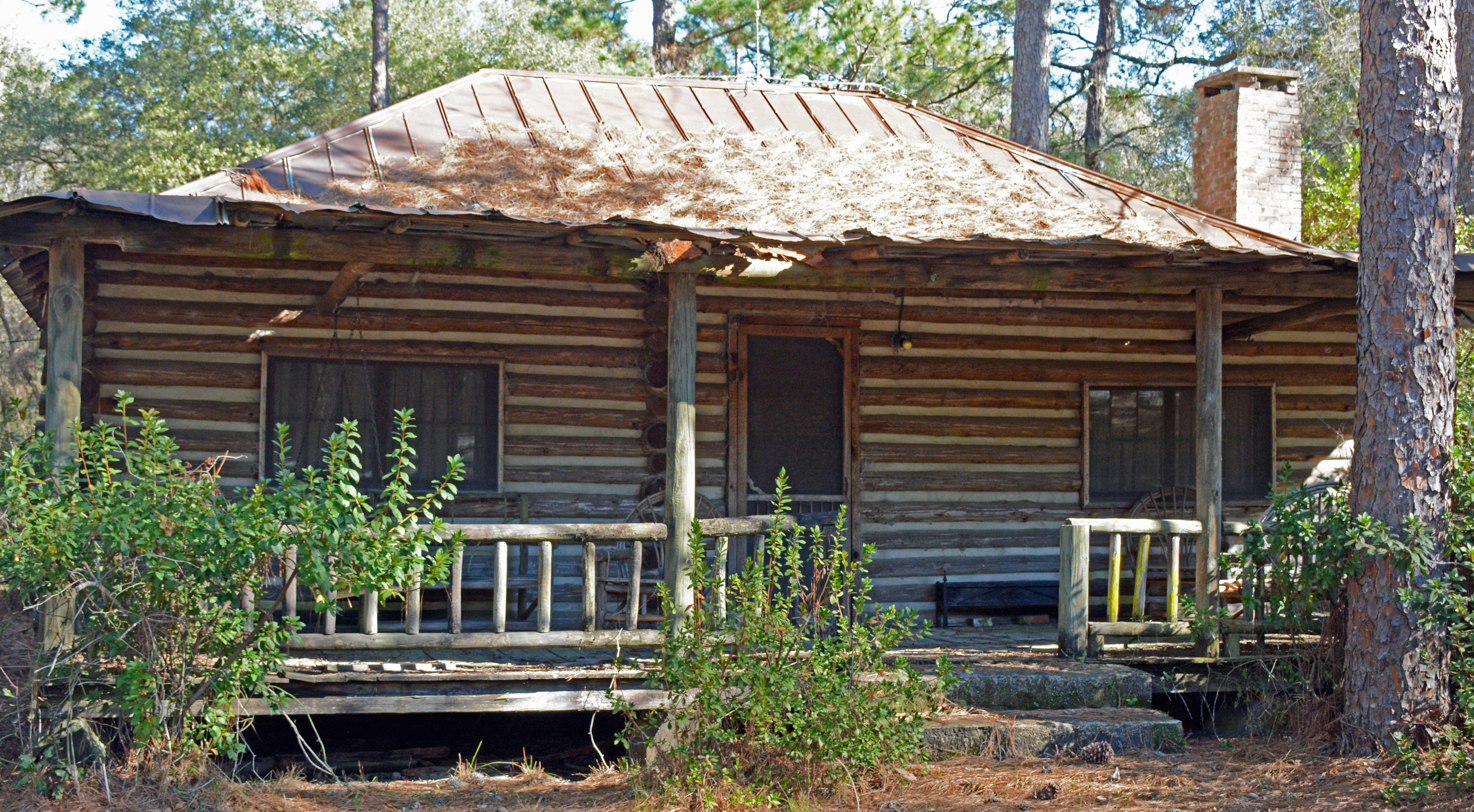
Log cabin with the still

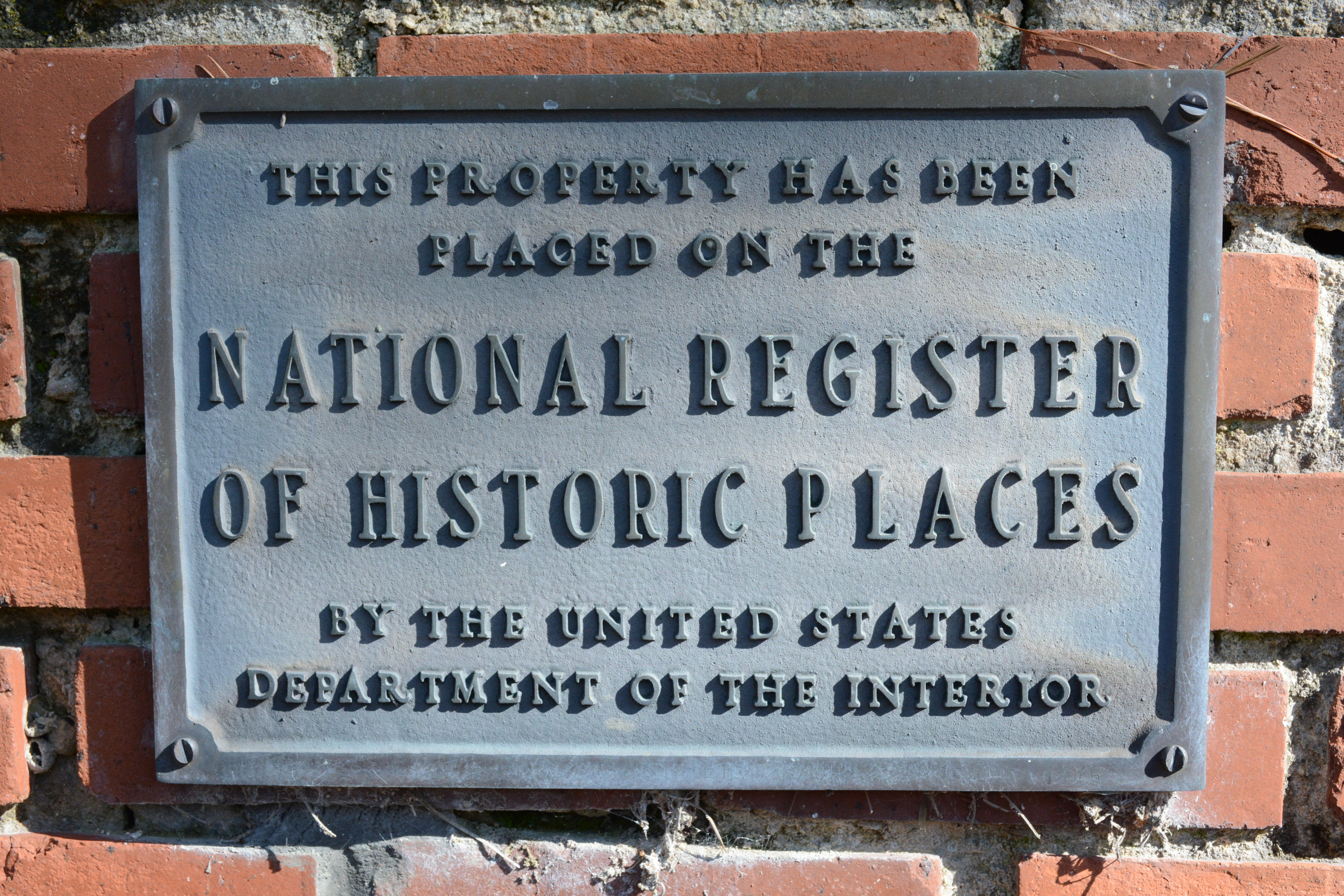
Historical marker

== See also ==
- National Register of Historic Places listings in Atkinson County, Georgia
- Naval stores industry
