= Naval stores =

Term for resins used in shipbuilding

p-Cymene is a major component of terpentine and related naval stores.

Naval stores refers to the industry that produces various chemicals collected from conifers. The term was originally applied to the compounds used in building and maintaining wooden sailing ships. Presently, the naval stores industry are used to manufacture certain kinds of soaps as well as components of paint, varnish, shoe polish, lubricants, linoleum, and roofing materials.

== History ==
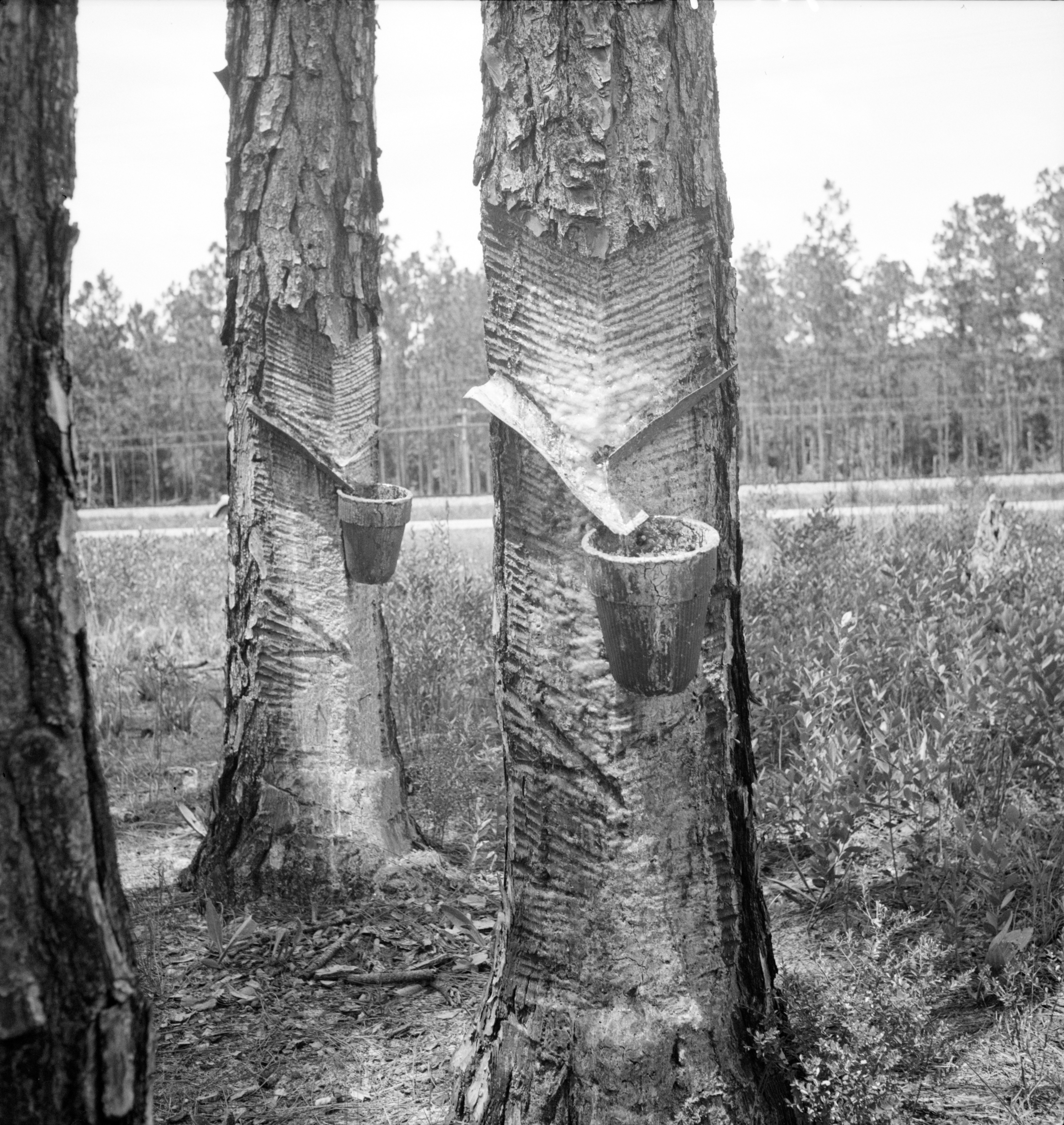
Herty system in use on turpentine trees in the northern Florida naval stores industry, circa 1936

The concept of naval stores came into existence during the Age of Sail. Wooden sailing ships, which were the primary form of long-distance transportation during the early modern period, required specialised materials to build and maintain. Demand for these materials across Europe and its colonies resulted in a global industry coming into existence to produce them.

The term naval stores references "[a]rticles or materials used in shipping or in the navy", and covered a wide range of supplies essential for shipping. European-style sailing ships required naval stores such as hemp, flax and resins for making and maintaining sails and ropes and for waterproofing; with the decline of the Age of Sail, the phrase "naval stores" has come to involve a relatively greater emphasis on resins from conifers.

The European colonisation of the Americas resulted in American colonies being used to produce naval stores which were sent to Europe. Beginning in 1608, cargoes of pine pitch, used to waterproof sailing ships, were sent from the English colony of Virginia to England.

By the 17th century, most of England's forests had been cut down for use as lumber or firewood, causing problems for the expanding Royal Navy, which required ever-increasing quantities of wood and naval stores amidst conflict with European nations. The English turned to importing naval stores from Sweden, but this proved infeasible when the Swedish naval stores industry was placed under the monopoly of a single company which sharply increased their prices. This occurred at a time when many European nations were expanding their navies, leading to an increase in demand for naval stores, causing prices to rise as they became more difficult to source.

Such difficulties led English authorities to increasingly source naval stores from England's North American colonies. In 1705, the Parliament of England passed the Importation Act 1704, which required the Royal Navy to pay inflated prices for naval stores from the colonies in an effect to encourage the development of the colonial naval stores industry. Attempts to build such an industry in New York and New England proved largely unsuccessful due to the higher profitability of other industries and colonists not wanting to "take on the messy work of making tar and pitch." However, the Southern Colonies, in particular the Carolinas, successfully developed a naval stores industry; by the 1770s, North Carolina's most important industry was producing naval stores. When the American War of Independence and tensions in Europe started to threaten to interfere with traditional supplies, British naval interests turned their attention to prospective sources in other colonies and potential colonies: India and Australasia, especially Norfolk Island and New Zealand..

Zallen tells in detail how turpentine (and rosin) are produced as naval stores. Pine trees especially in North Carolina were tapped for sap which was doubly distilled to make turpentine and rosin (aka resin)–hence the name tar heels. The trees were scored with a ledge called a "box" to collect the sap. Large numbers of slaves were used to score the trees, collect and process the sap. Zallen describes this as industrial slavery–different from the more common vision of slaves in agriculture. By the 1840s camphine, a blend of turpentine and grain alcohol, became the dominant lamp fuel in the US. [Zallen prefers the camphene spelling.]

The pine trees of North Carolina were well suited to camphine production. The business also provided additional need for slaves as production expanded. Backwoods became more productive. Slaves were often leased in winter when agriculture was slower. The value of many was protected by life insurance. Wilmington, North Carolina, became a center of the camphene industry. In cities, gaslighting was also available, but used by the upper classes. Camphine was the fuel of the average family.

Zallen reports that after Ft. Sumter, turpentine producers were cut off from major markets. Emancipation left them without manpower to collect and process turpentine. The camps were flammable. Many were burned in William Tecumseh Sherman's march from Savannah, Georgia, to Goldsboro, North Carolina. Congress also imposed taxes on alcohol to pay for the Civil War. That made camphine more costly than kerosene. Kerosene, first produced as coal oil, became abundant after the discovery of oil in Pennsylvania.

The major producers of naval stores in the 19th and 20th century were the United States and France, where Napoleon encouraged planting of pines in areas of sand dunes. In the 1920s the United States exported eleven million gallons of spirits. By 1927, France exported about 20 percent of the world's resin.

=== Organizational aspects ===
Once, large operations, known as "factors", controlled huge tracts of forests, some in the hundreds of thousands of acres, which they leased to smaller "operators", and also advanced them capital, usually in the form of tools and other equipment and goods with which to operate. The operators satisfied their debt to the factors by returning the produce, barrels of resin. The name "Factors Walk" on the riverfront in Savannah, Georgia, commemorates an area on the Savannah River harbor where thousands of barrels of produce were collected for transshipment. Between 1880 and 1920, Savannah was the largest port for naval stores products and continued to set the world price of naval stores until 1950.

Naval stores also included cordage, mask, pitch and tar. These materials were used for water- and weather-proofing wooden ships. were traditionally used for Masts, spars, and cordage needed protecting, and hulls made of wood required a flexible material, insoluble in water, to seal the spaces between planks. Pine pitch was often mixed with fibers like hemp to caulk spaces which might otherwise leak.

=== After the age of wooden ships ===
With the demise of wooden ships, those uses of pine resin ended, but the former naval stores industry remained vigorous as new products created new markets. First extensively described by Frederick Law Olmsted in his book A Journey in the Seaboard Slave States (1856), the naval stores industry was one of the economic mainstays of the southeastern United States until the late 20th century. Despite a rapid decline of the gum naval stores industry in the last quarter of the 20th century, a few places in the southeastern United States still rely on it as a major part of their livelihood.

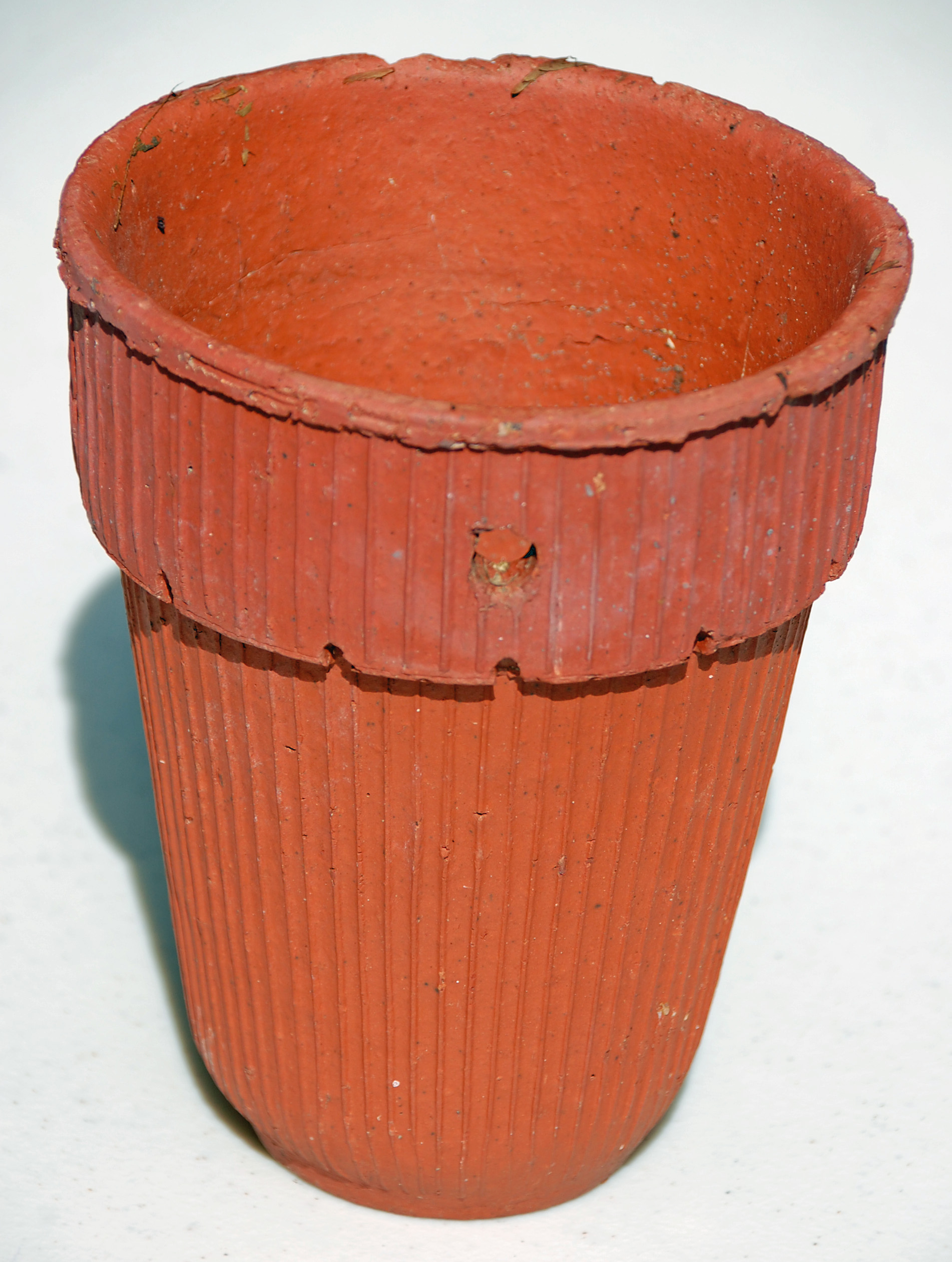
Herty turpentine cup, made of clay. The hole is for nailing to a pine tree.

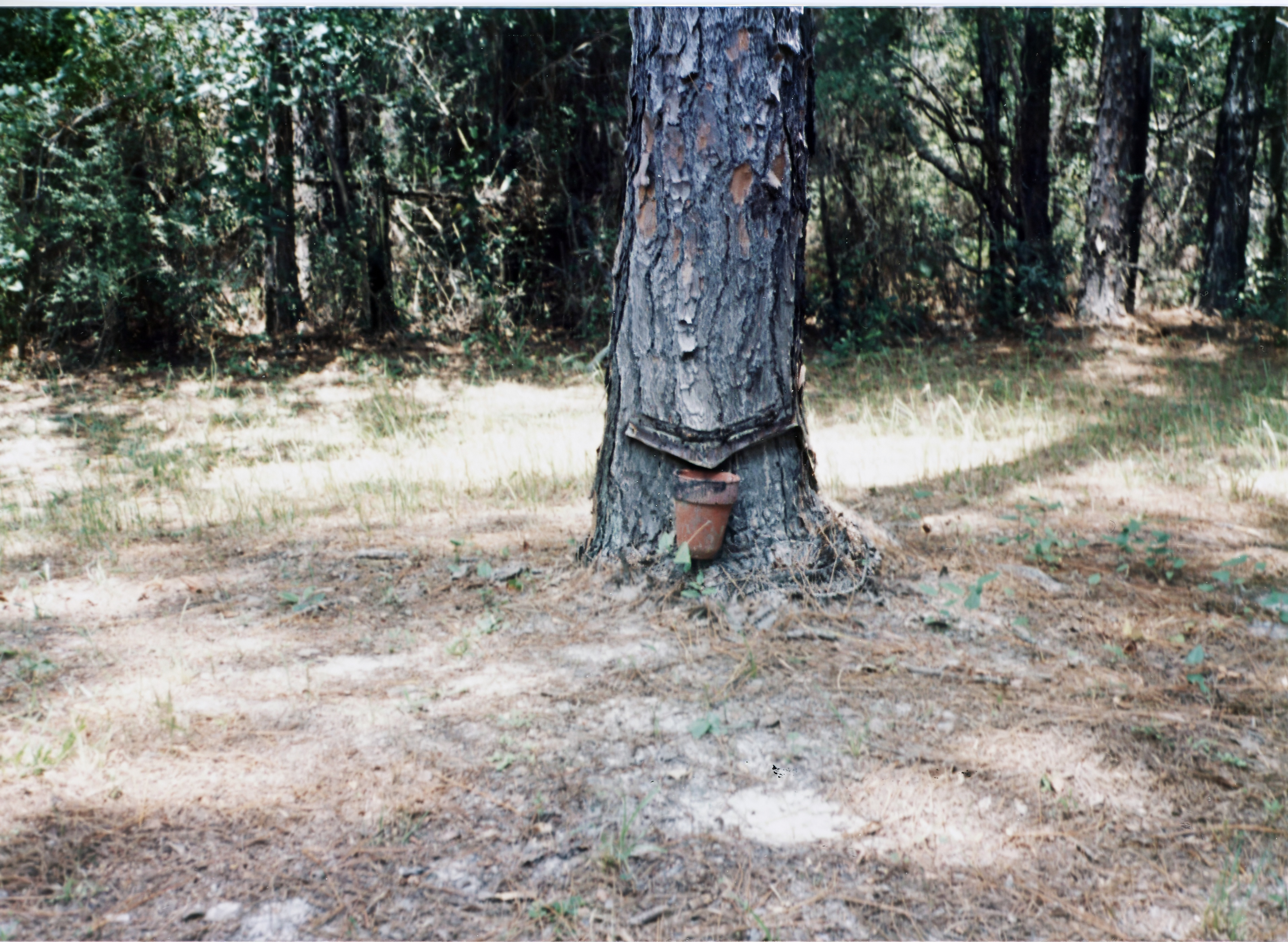
Pine tree with metal guides to a Herty cup

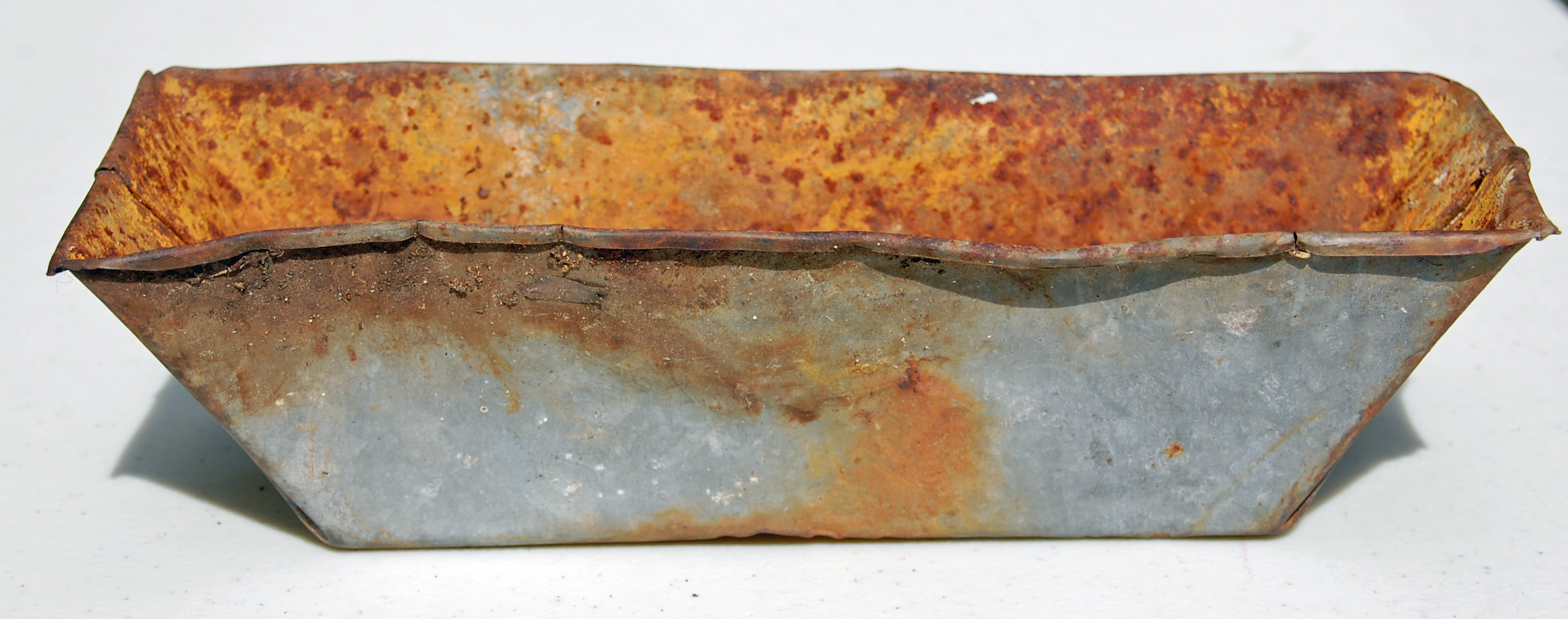
Turpentine cup made of tin, was attached to a pine tree

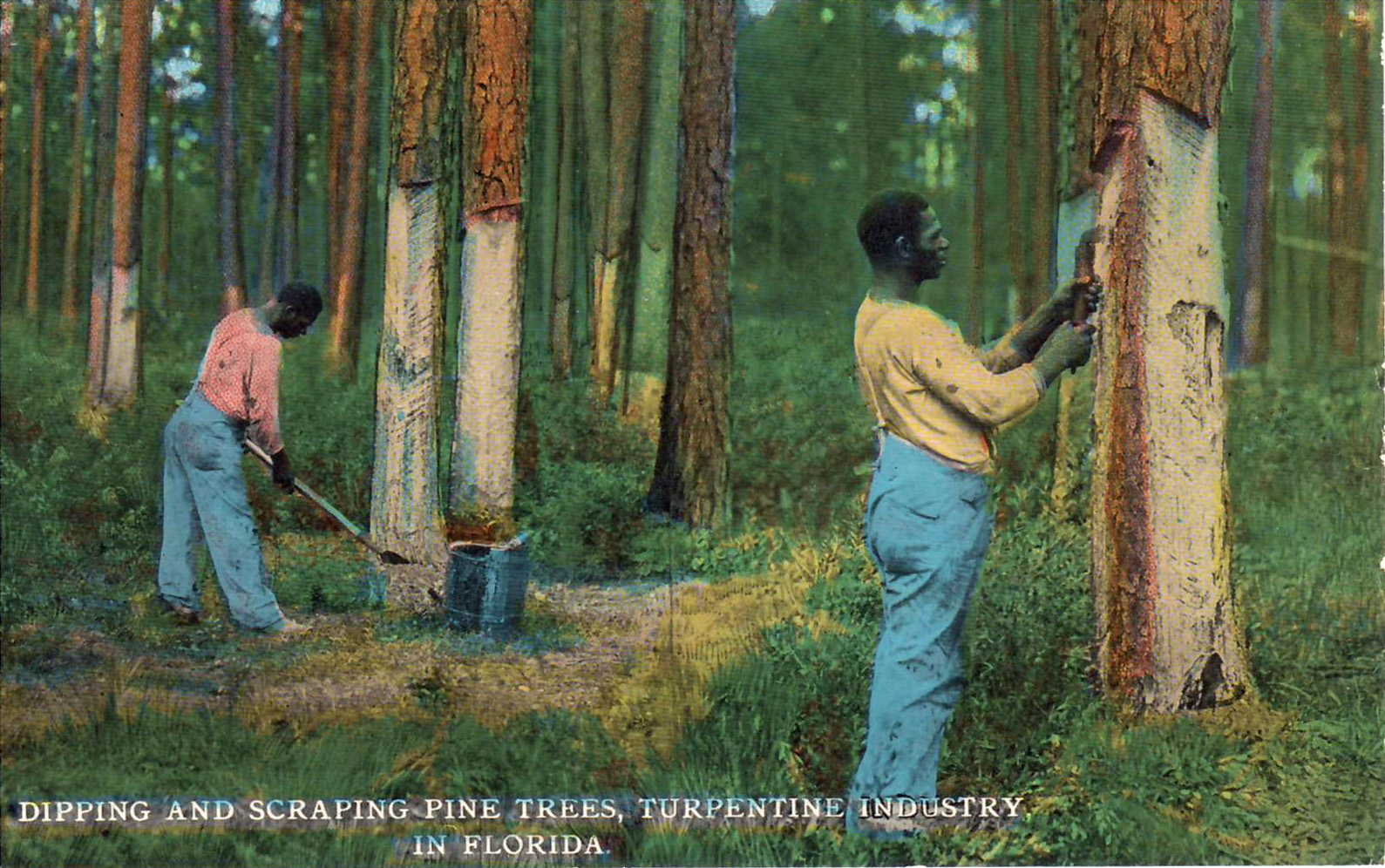
1912 postcard

=== Industry today ===
The gum naval stores industry steeply declined beginning in the 1960s. As of 2001 in the U.S., only one large-scale facility (begun as Filtered Rosin Products) in Baxley, Georgia, continues in operation, serving the remaining naval stores producers in the surrounding area. Gradually, the method of tapping trees to obtain naval stores products has become overshadowed by industries which yield these products as byproducts of other operations.

== Processing ==
=== Gum naval stores cultivation ===
The labor-intensive method of extracting pine resin from the trees (the raw gum)—tapping the trees—vaguely resembles that used in traditional rubber and maple syrup production. In one method, the tree is gashed with an inch-wide curved blade, called a "hack", to remove all of the bark down through the cambium layer. An angled piece of galvanized tin is then placed below the eight-inch-long, one-inch-wide gash (also known as "the streak") to direct the oozing sap into a quart-sized rectangular cup fixed to the tree. Each new "streak" is put onto the tree above the preceding one, and gradually a vertical "cat face" more than thirty inches in height was formed. Through the mid-twentieth century, a "puller", a type of hack that had a long handle, was used to extend the streak up the tree to a height of more than seven feet.

=== Separation techniques ===
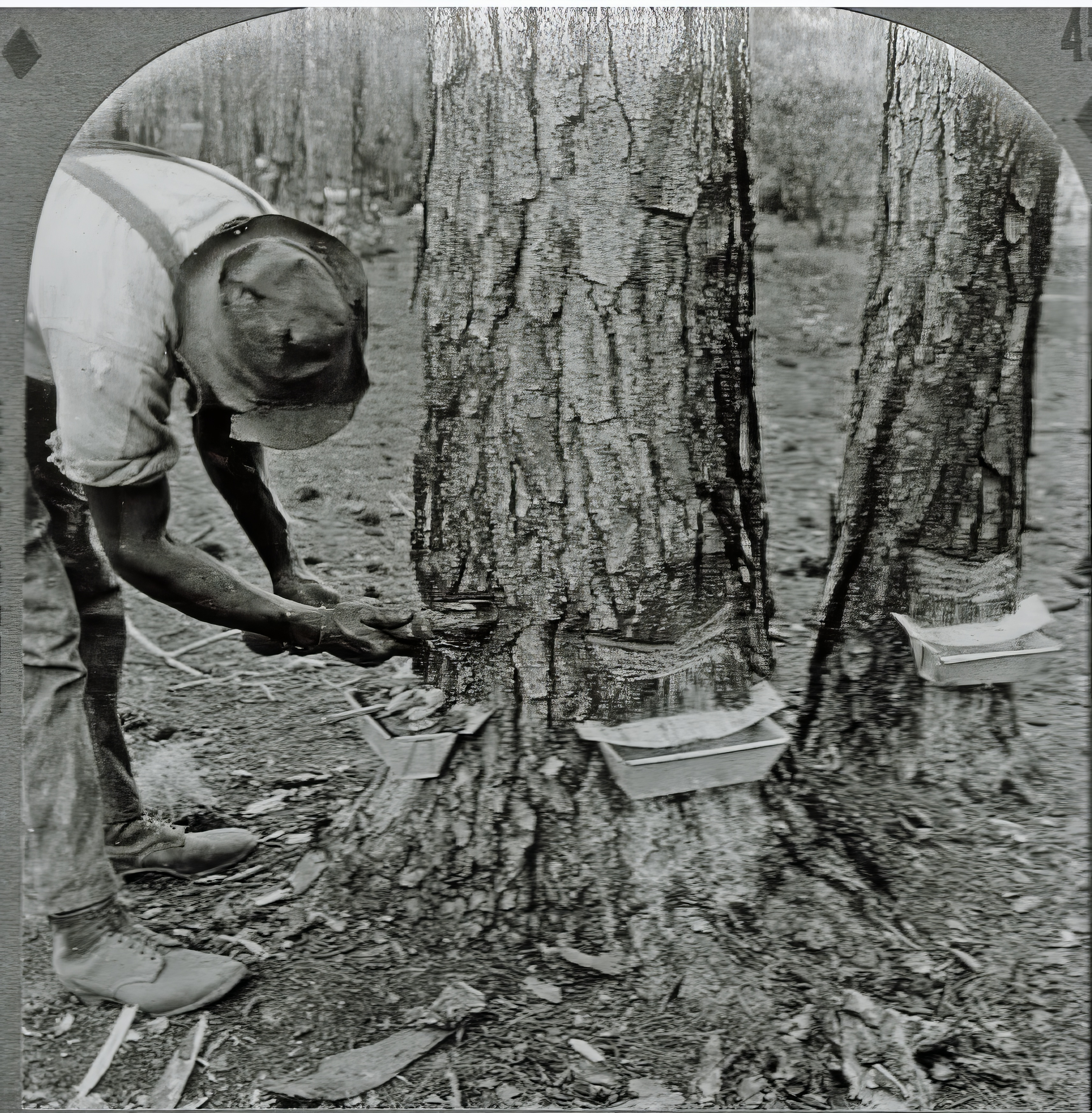
"Chipping" a pine tree in Georgia (c. 1915) to obtain sap

Today naval stores are recovered from the tall oil byproduct stream of Kraft process pulping of pines in the US, though tapping of living pines remains common in other parts of the world. Turpentine and pine oil may be recovered by dry distillation of oleoresin or by destructive distillation of pine wood. Solvent extraction of shredded stumps and roots has become more common with the availability of inexpensive naphtha. Rosin remains in the still after turpentine and water have boiled off.

The naval stores industry produces and markets products derived from the oleoresin of pine trees, including rosin, tall oil, pine oil, and turpentine. It does this by collecting and processing organic forest products refined from slash pine and longleaf pine trees (genus Pinus). The naval stores industry was associated with the maintenance of the wooden ships and sailing tackle of pre-20th century navies, which were caulked and waterproofed using the pitch (a product made with tar) of the pine tree.

== Pine rosin processes ==
The basic raw material, pine resin, once collected, is converted into two major products: rosin and turpentine. For many years rosin and turpentine were used unprocessed in common household products such as soap, paper, paint, and varnish. Today most rosin is altered to be used in a wide range of products that includes paper sizing, surface coatings, adhesives, printing inks, and rubber compounds. Turpentine, like rosin, has become a versatile material exploited to develop uses in fragrances, flavors, vitamins, household cleaning products, medicines, and polyterpene resin.

== See also ==
- Shipbuilding
- Bark hack
- McCranie's Turpentine Still
- Non-timber forest product
