= Bark hack =

Tool to remove tree bark

A bark (or turpentine) hack is a tool used to remove pine tree bark to promote the flow of pine resin, which is used in naval stores production. The tool consists of a wooden shaft with a weighted butt and hook-like, replaceable, U-shaped blades at the head.

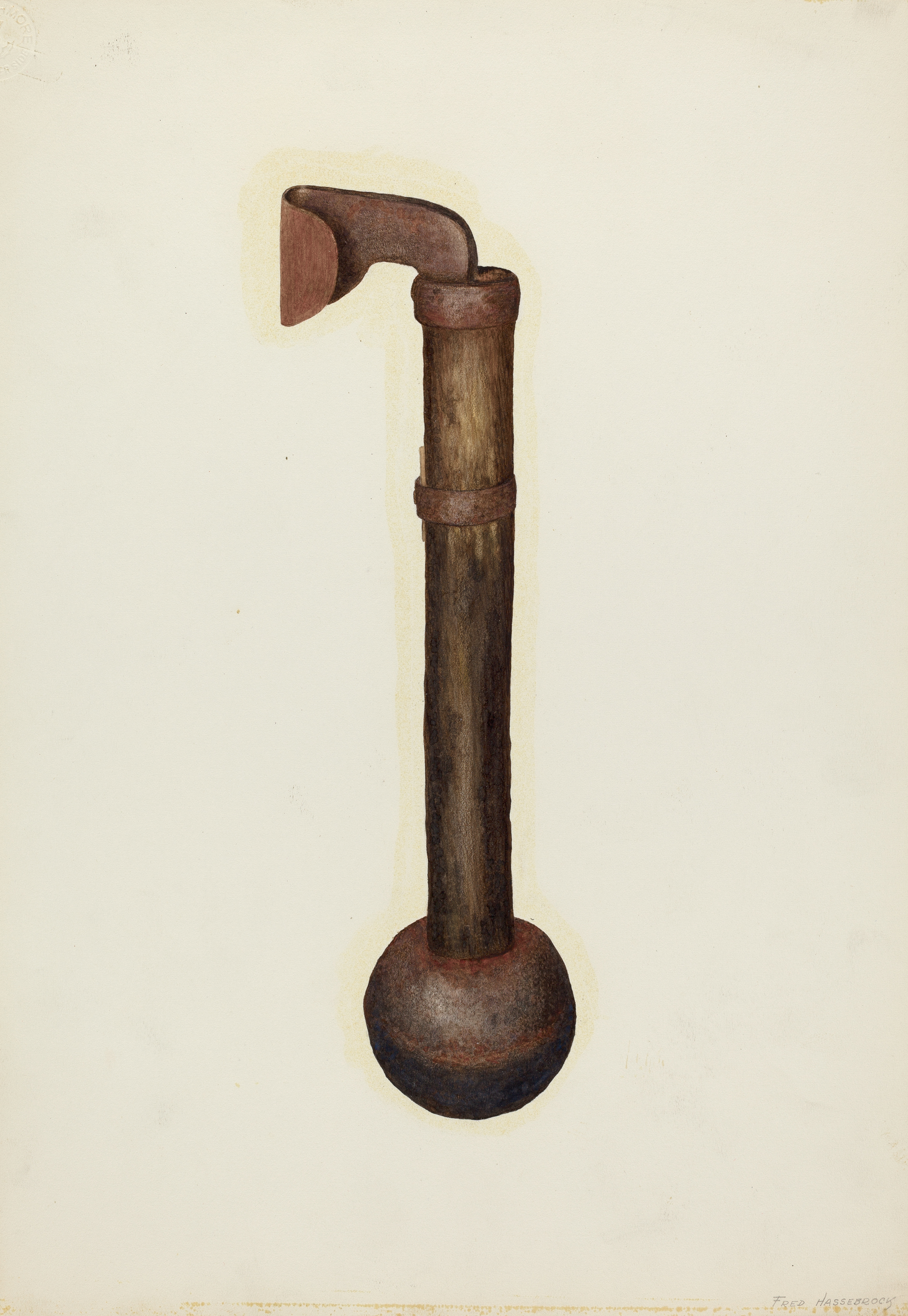
A bark hack, c. 1939.

The bark hack is swung much like an axe and is used to create a hatched chevron pattern ("cat face" or less frequently, a "blaze") into trees' exposed sapwood. The weighted end helps the operator follow through with the force necessary for the hooked blade to scoop out chips of hard pine wood. This would result in the tree's turpentine or resin stocks flowing directly down into a collection site in a similar process to tapping.

Turpentine hacks were eventually phased out by the early 1950s, and today they are primarily historical tools, with modern resin collection using mechanized methods and updated forestry practices.
