= Kirkland, Georgia =

Unincorporated community in Georgia, U.S.

Coordinates: 31°18′29.73″N 82°54′29.53″W

Kirkland is an unincorporated community in Atkinson County, in the U.S. state of Georgia. It was originally in Coffee County, before Atkinson County was formed in 1917.

== History ==
A post office called Kirkland was established in 1875, and remained in operation until 1954. Kirkland (both the post office and, consequently, the surrounding hamlet) was likely named for the several large families of that surname in the area. One widely assumed namesake was Timothy Kirkland (1799-1864), a local landowner, after whom nearby Kirkland Pond was named. Another possibility was William Kirkland, who operated a general store adjacent to the post office.

According to a newspaper article titled "History of Kirkland", written by Mrs. W. L. Kirkland, the town was named after Joseph Kirkland, Bill Kirkland, and Mack Kirkland. Before the railroad (Atlantic Coast Line Railroad) came through, Joseph Kirkland dammed the Kirkland fish pond. He built a house, a grist mill, and cotton gins, which were operated by water power. He also put up a blacksmith shop. Mack and Bill Kirkland built a log store house. The Kirkland family gave land for several miles of the railroad to be built. A forest fire burned up many houses and the machinery of Joseph Kirkland as well as the store of Mack and Bill Kirkland. Mack and Bill moved to the north side of the railroad, built houses, and got married.
