= Coffee High School =

Coffee High School may refer to:

- Coffee High School (Georgia), United States
- Coffee High School (Alabama), United States
