= Willacoochee =

Willacoochee, Georgia
- City
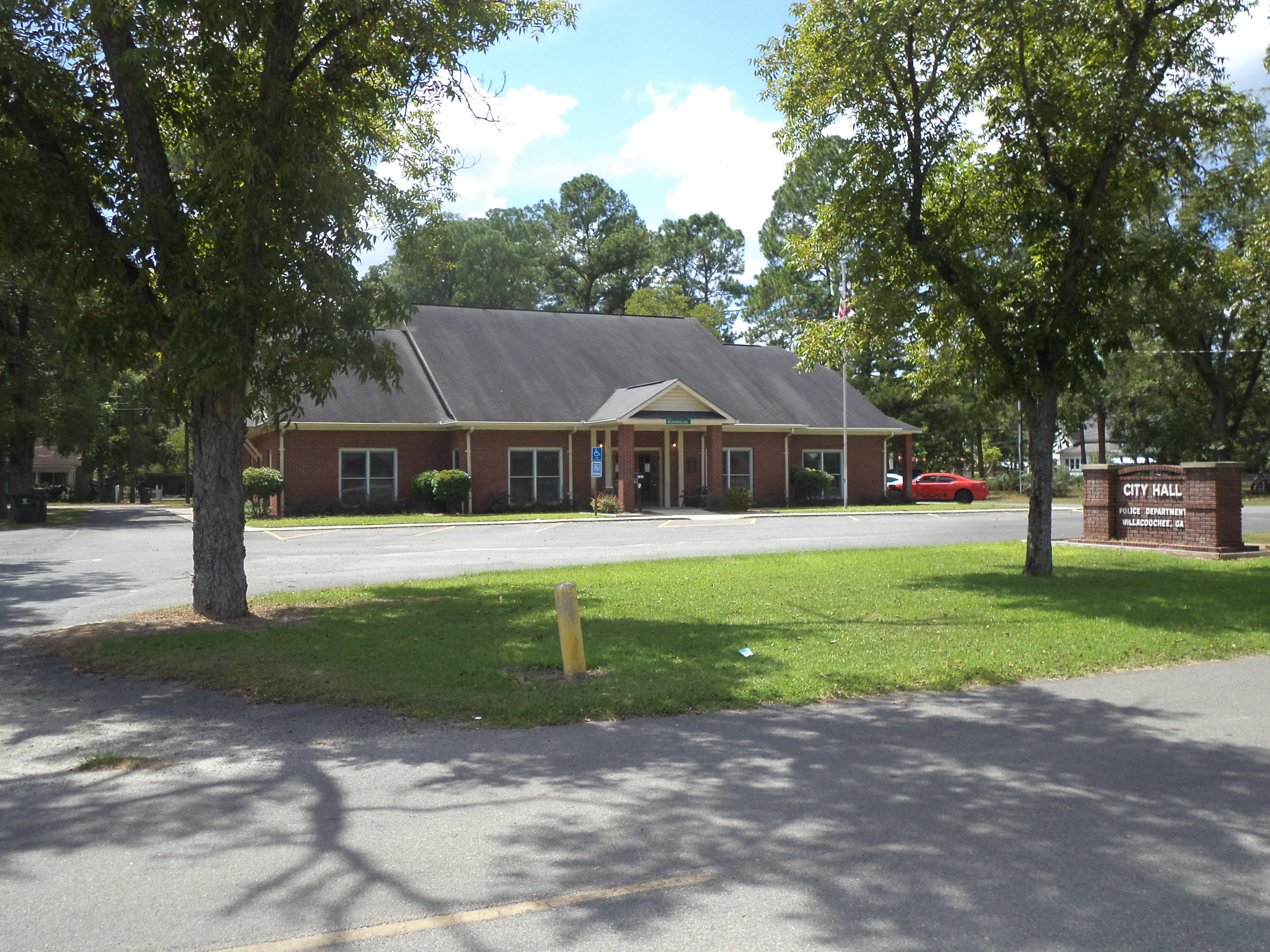
- Willacoochee City Hall and Police Department
- Motto: Where good people live
- Location in Atkinson County and the state of Georgia
- Coordinates: 31°20′7″N 83°2′47″W
- Country: United States
- State: Georgia
- County: Atkinson
- Incorporated: November 12, 1889

Area
  - Total: 3.82 sq mi (9.90 km^{2})
  - Land: 3.82 sq mi (9.89 km^{2})
  - Water: 0 sq mi (0.00 km^{2})
- Elevation: 240 ft (73 m)

Population (2020)
  - Total: 1,240
  - Density: 324.6/sq mi (125.33/km^{2})
- Time zone: UTC-5 (Eastern (EST))
  - Summer (DST): UTC-4 (EDT)
- ZIP code: 31650
- Area code: 912
- FIPS code: 13-82972
- GNIS feature ID: 0333429
- Website: www.willacoochee.com

Willacoochee is a city in Atkinson County, Georgia, United States, along the Alapaha River. The population was 1,240 in 2020.

== History ==
The Georgia General Assembly incorporated Willacoochee as a town in 1889. Willacoochee is a name derived from the Creek language meaning "home of the wildcats".

== Geography ==
Willacoochee is located at 31°20′7″N 83°2′47″W (31.335175, -83.046381), within the Southeast Georgia region. According to the U.S. Census Bureau, the city has a total area of 3.8 square miles (9.9 km^{2}), all land.

== Demographics ==
Historical population
Census	Pop.	Note	%±
1890	398		—
1900	471		18.3%
1910	960		103.8%
1920	1,211		26.1%
1930	1,006		−16.9%
1940	903		−10.2%
1950	987		9.3%
1960	1,061		7.5%
1970	1,120		5.6%
1980	1,166		4.1%
1990	1,205		3.3%
2000	1,434		19.0%
2010	1,391		−3.0%
2020	1,240		−10.9%
U.S. Decennial Census

Willacoochee racial composition as of 2020
Race	Num.	Perc.
White (non-Hispanic)	500	40.32%
Black or African American (non-Hispanic)	423	34.11%
Native American	5	0.4%
Pacific Islander	2	0.16%
Other/Mixed	28	2.26%
Hispanic or Latino	282	22.74%

As of the 2020 United States census, there were 1,240 people, 529 households, and 291 families residing in the city, down from 2010's 1,391. Among its population in 2020, 40.32% were non-Hispanic white, 34.11% Black or African American, 0.4% Native American, 0.16% Pacific Islander, 2.26% multiracial, and 22.74% Hispanic or Latino of any race.

== Gallery ==
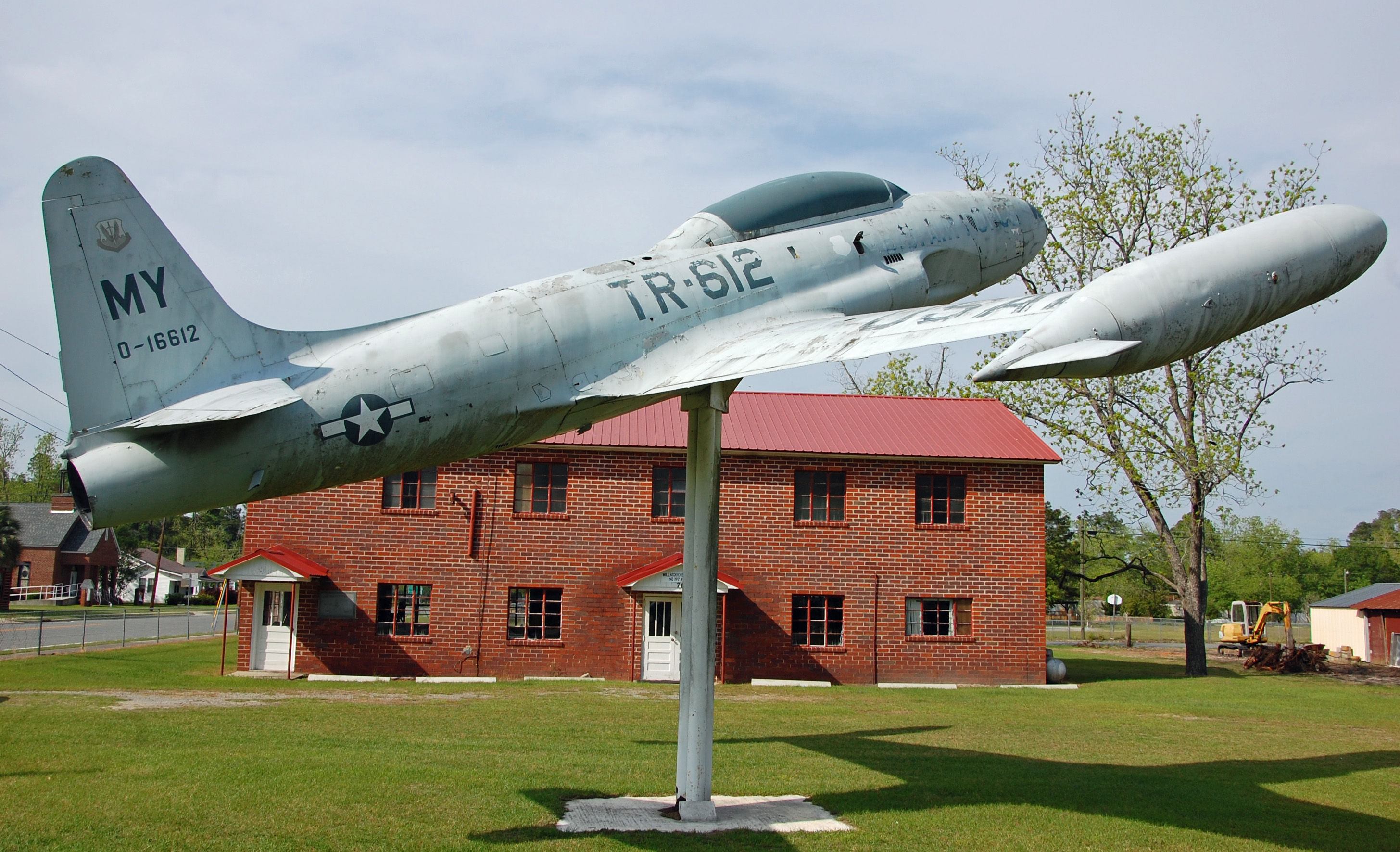
A Lockheed T-33 in Willacoochee. A T-33 crashed here ca. 1960s. Located 31°20'28.7"N 83°02'52.1"W(31.341306,-83.047806)

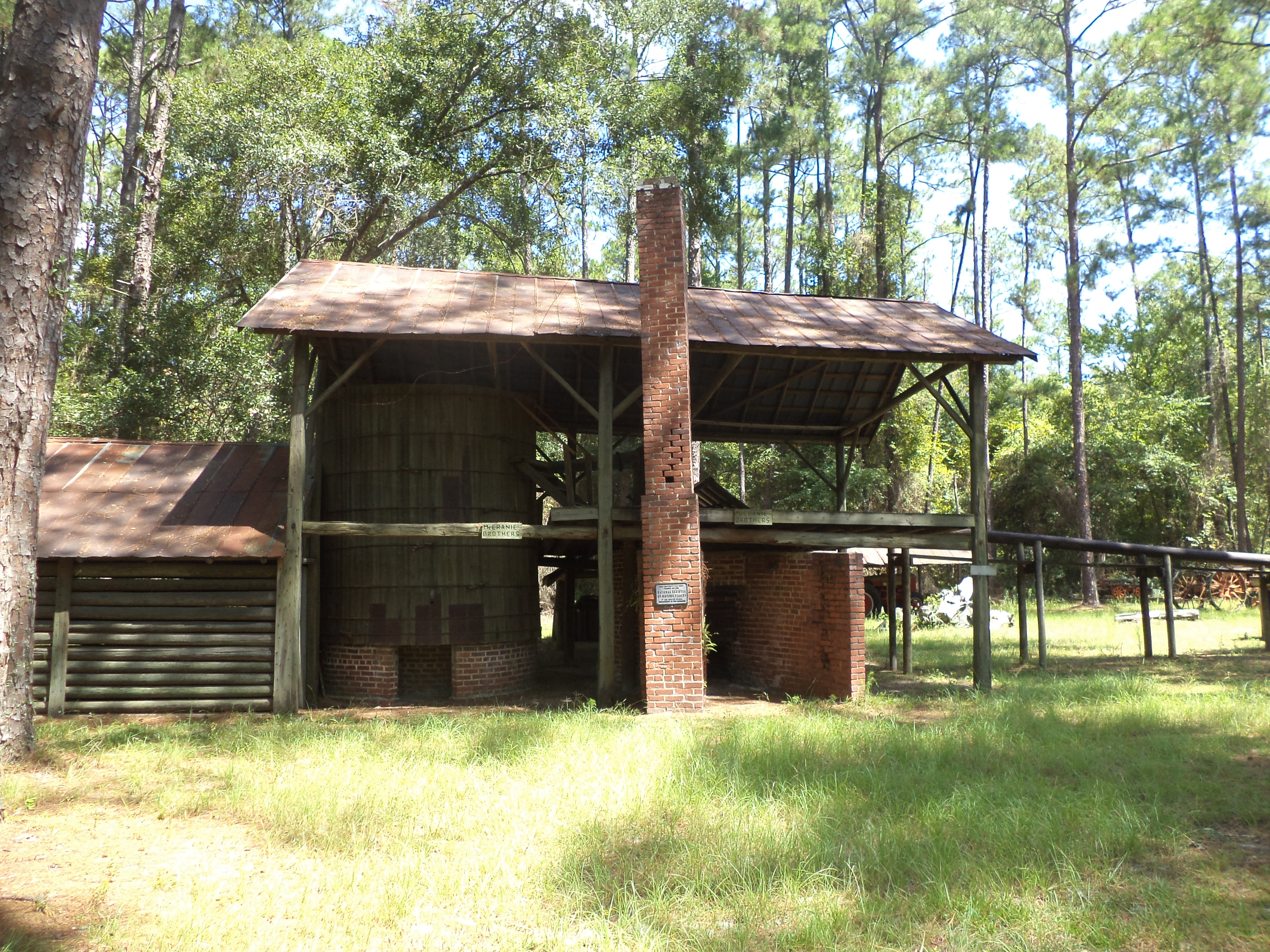
McCranie's Turpentine Still, just west of Willacoochee, on the National Register of Historic Places

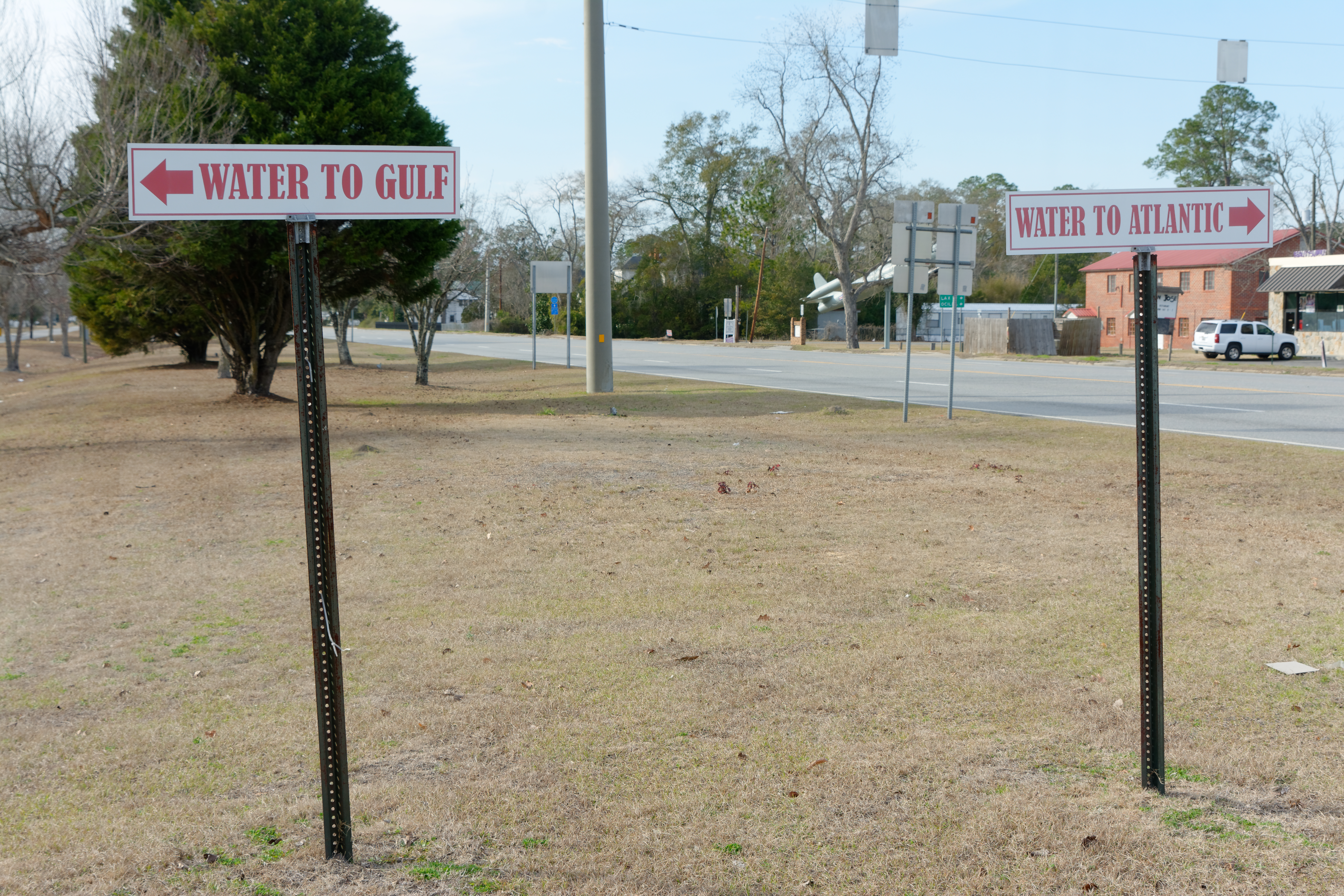
Signs indicating drainage divide
