= Atkinson County, Georgia =

County in Georgia, United States

- County
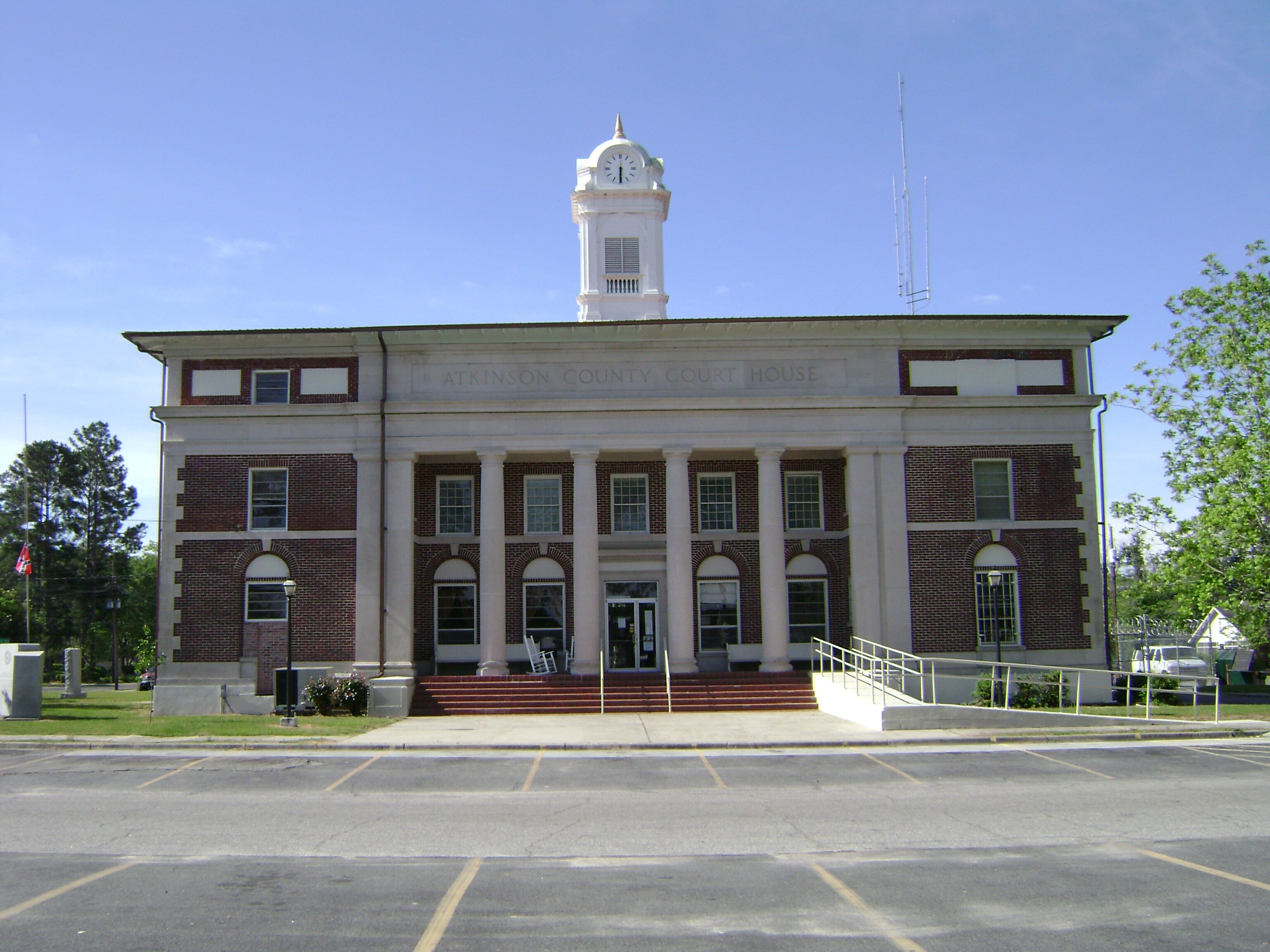
- Atkinson County Courthouse in Pearson

- Location within the U.S. state of Georgia
- Coordinates: 31°17′N 82°52′W
- Country: United States
- State: Georgia
- Founded: August 15, 1917; 109 years ago
- Named for: William Yates Atkinson
- Seat: Pearson
- Largest city: Pearson

Area
  - Total: 345 sq mi (890 km^{2})
  - Land: 339 sq mi (880 km^{2})
  - Water: 5.2 sq mi (13 km^{2}) 1.5%

Population (2020)
  - Total: 8,286
  - Estimate (2025): 8,454 ▲
  - Density: 24.4/sq mi (9.44/km^{2})
- Time zone: UTC−5 (Eastern)
  - Summer (DST): UTC−4 (EDT)
- Congressional district: 8th
- Website: atkinsoncounty.org

Atkinson County is a county located in the southeastern region of the U.S. state of Georgia. As of the 2020 census, the county's population was 8,286. The county seat is Pearson. The county was formed in 1917 from parts of Coffee and Clinch counties. It is named for William Yates Atkinson, Democratic governor of Georgia from 1894 to 1898. In 2003, it had the highest illiteracy rate of any U.S. county at 36%.

== Geography ==
According to the U.S. Census Bureau, the county has a total area of 345 square miles (890 km^{2}), of which 339 square miles (880 km^{2}) is land and 5.2 square miles (13 km^{2}) (1.5%) is water. Atkinson County forms a part of Southeast Georgia.

The vast majority of Atkinson County is located in the Satilla River sub-basin of the St. Marys-Satilla River basin. The entire narrow western border area, in a line parallel to the western border and running through Willacoochee, is located in the Alapaha River sub-basin of the Suwannee River basin. A small southeastern corner of the county is located in the Upper Suwannee River sub-basin of the same Suwannee River basin.

=== Adjacent counties ===
- Coffee County - north
- Ware County - east
- Clinch County - south
- Lanier County - southwest
- Berrien County - west

=== Communities ===
==== Cities ====
- Pearson
- Willacoochee

==== Census-designated place ====
- Axson

==== Unincorporated communities ====
- Fales (portion)
- Henderson Still
- Kirkland
- Leliaton
- Little Utah
- Mora (portion)
- Oberry
- Sandy Bottom
- Stokesville (portion)

== Demographics ==
Historical population
Census	Pop.	Note	%±
1920	7,656		—
1930	6,894		−10.0%
1940	7,093		2.9%
1950	7,362		3.8%
1960	6,188		−15.9%
1970	5,879		−5.0%
1980	6,141		4.5%
1990	6,213		1.2%
2000	7,609		22.5%
2010	8,375		10.1%
2020	8,286		−1.1%
2025 (est.)	8,454	▲	2.0%
U.S. Decennial Census; 1790-1880 1890-1910; 1920-1930 1930-1940; 1940-1950 1960-1980; 1980-2000 2010-2019

=== Racial and ethnic composition ===
Atkinson County, Georgia – Racial and ethnic composition Note: the US Census treats Hispanic/Latino as an ethnic category. This table excludes Latinos from the racial categories and assigns them to a separate category. Hispanics/Latinos may be of any race.
Race / Ethnicity (NH = Non-Hispanic)	Pop 1980	Pop 1990	Pop 2000	Pop 2010	Pop 2020	% 1980	% 1990	% 2000	% 2010	% 2020
White alone (NH)	4,411	4,400	4,760	4,776	4,801	71.83%	70.82%	62.56%	57.03%	57.94%
Black or African American alone (NH)	1,662	1,654	1,477	1,428	1,208	27.06%	26.62%	19.41%	17.05%	14.58%
Native American or Alaska Native alone (NH)	0	2	23	31	30	0.00%	0.03%	0.30%	0.37%	0.36%
Asian alone (NH)	11	3	9	17	12	0.18%	0.05%	0.12%	0.20%	0.14%
Native Hawaiian or Pacific Islander alone (NH)	x	x	0	14	4	x	x	0.00%	0.17%	0.05%
Other race alone (NH)	1	0	3	4	16	0.02%	0.00%	0.04%	0.05%	0.19%
Mixed race or Multiracial (NH)	x	x	47	66	167	x	x	0.62%	0.79%	2.02%
Hispanic or Latino (any race)	56	154	1,290	2,039	2,048	0.91%	2.48%	16.95%	24.35%	24.72%
Total	6,141	6,213	7,609	8,375	8,286	100.00%	100.00%	100.00%	100.00%	100.00%

Since the county's 1920 population of 7,656 residents, its population has fluctuated between more than 7,000 to a low of 6,213 in 1990; the lowest population for the county was 5,879 in 1970. By the 2020 census, its population increased to 8,286, although in 2010 its population reached a historic high of 8,375.

=== 2020 census ===
As of the 2020 census, the county had a population of 8,286. Of the residents, 26.0% were under the age of 18 and 14.0% were 65 years of age or older; the median age was 37.5 years. For every 100 females there were 100.2 males, and for every 100 females age 18 and over there were 99.1 males. 0.0% of residents lived in urban areas and 100.0% lived in rural areas.

The racial makeup of the county was 63.7% White, 14.6% Black or African American, 0.8% American Indian and Alaska Native, 0.2% Asian, 0.0% Native Hawaiian and Pacific Islander, 12.5% from some other race, and 8.1% from two or more races. Hispanic or Latino residents of any race comprised 24.7% of the population.

Non-Hispanic white residents made up 57.94% of the county-area population while the African American share declined to 14.58% in 2020, reflecting a shift from the 2010 distribution. These changes mirrored nationwide trends toward greater racial and ethnic diversity noted after the 2020 census releases.

There were 3,064 households in the county, of which 37.4% had children under the age of 18 living with them and 26.2% had a female householder with no spouse or partner present. About 23.9% of all households were made up of individuals and 10.3% had someone living alone who was 65 years of age or older.

There were 3,470 housing units, of which 11.7% were vacant. Among occupied housing units, 71.8% were owner-occupied and 28.2% were renter-occupied. The homeowner vacancy rate was 1.0% and the rental vacancy rate was 4.6%.

=== 2010 census ===
According to the 2010 U.S. census, the racial makeup of the county was 62.2% white, 17.3% black or African American, 0.6% American Indian, 0.3% Pacific Islander, 0.3% Asian, 17.7% from other races, and 1.6% from two or more races. Altogether, those of Hispanic or Latino origin made up 24.3% of the population. In terms of ancestry, 16.1% were English, 16.0% were Irish, and 7.5% were American.

In 2010, there were 3,522 housing units at an average density of 10.4 per square mile (4.0/km^{2}).

By 2010, the median income for a household in the county was $33,834 and the median income for a family was $34,859. Males had a median income of $29,286 versus $25,705 for females.

=== 2000 census ===
In 2000, the median income for a household in the county was $26,470, and the median income for a family was $32,688. Males had a median income of $24,763 versus $18,434 for females. The per capita income for the county was $12,178.

=== American Community Survey ===
In 2020, the county's median household income was an estimated $35,703 per the American Community Survey. Families had a median income of $46,086; married-couple families $50,475; and nonfamily households $23,306. Among its 2022 population estimates, 27.5% of the county lived at or below the poverty line.

As of 2022's American Community Survey, Atkinson County's 3,063 households had an average of 2.7 people per household. Approximately 66% were married couples, 6% male households and 17% female households. These households were spread throughout 3,494 housing units, and 67% were owner-occupied. The median value of owner-occupied housing units was $77,100 with 62% of its properties valued at under $100,000.

As part of the Bible Belt, the majority of the county's religious or spiritual population professed Christianity. Among the Christian population in 2020, the Association of Religion Data Archives determined the largest single Christian denomination for Atkinson County was the Southern Baptist Convention, followed by The Church of Jesus Christ of Latter-day Saints, and the African Methodist Episcopal Church and United Methodist Church. As a whole tradition, Pentecostalism encompassed the following, with Catholicism remaining a minority.

== Education ==
Atkinson County is serviced along with Coffee County by the Satilla Regional Library System.

== Transportation ==
=== Major highways ===
- US 82 / SR 520
- US 221 / SR 31
- US 441
- SR 64
- SR 89
- SR 90
- SR 135

== Politics ==
United States presidential election results for Atkinson County, Georgia
Year	Republican		Democratic		Third party(ies)	
Year	No.	%	No.	%	No.	%
1920	119	20.80%	453	79.20%	0	0.00%
1924	25	5.73%	394	90.37%	17	3.90%
1928	121	25.69%	350	74.31%	0	0.00%
1932	41	5.17%	747	94.20%	5	0.63%
1936	29	2.94%	958	97.06%	0	0.00%
1940	66	8.57%	703	91.30%	1	0.13%
1944	90	10.51%	766	89.49%	0	0.00%
1948	66	5.89%	938	83.75%	116	10.36%
1952	194	11.06%	1,560	88.94%	0	0.00%
1956	122	6.63%	1,719	93.37%	0	0.00%
1960	239	15.55%	1,298	84.45%	0	0.00%
1964	1,157	58.76%	811	41.19%	1	0.05%
1968	288	11.39%	686	27.14%	1,554	61.47%
1972	924	74.94%	309	25.06%	0	0.00%
1976	347	18.20%	1,560	81.80%	0	0.00%
1980	747	33.62%	1,449	65.21%	26	1.17%
1984	944	51.17%	901	48.83%	0	0.00%
1988	1,126	55.60%	887	43.80%	12	0.59%
1992	779	35.65%	1,056	48.33%	350	16.02%
1996	784	42.94%	823	45.07%	219	11.99%
2000	1,228	59.30%	821	39.64%	22	1.06%
2004	1,666	67.37%	799	32.31%	8	0.32%
2008	1,941	66.77%	938	32.27%	28	0.96%
2012	1,938	66.67%	930	31.99%	39	1.34%
2016	1,878	71.95%	697	26.70%	35	1.34%
2020	2,300	72.90%	825	26.15%	30	0.95%
2024	2,350	76.87%	700	22.90%	7	0.23%

United States Senate election results for Atkinson County, Georgia2
Year	Republican		Democratic		Third party(ies)	
Year	No.	%	No.	%	No.	%
2020	2,272	73.36%	773	24.96%	52	1.68%
2020	1,925	72.78%	720	27.22%	0	0.00%

United States Senate election results for Atkinson County, Georgia3
Year	Republican		Democratic		Third party(ies)	
Year	No.	%	No.	%	No.	%
2020	1,038	34.66%	406	13.56%	1,551	51.79%
2020	1,926	72.73%	722	27.27%	0	0.00%
2022	1,709	76.36%	502	22.43%	27	1.21%
2022	1,524	75.86%	485	24.14%	0	0.00%

Georgia Gubernatorial election results for Atkinson County
Year	Republican		Democratic		Third party(ies)	
Year	No.	%	No.	%	No.	%
2022	1,767	78.67%	467	20.79%	12	0.53%

As of the 2020s, Atkinson County is a Republican stronghold, voting 77% for Donald Trump in 2024. Historically, Atkinson County has primarily voted for Democratic Party candidates in U.S. presidential elections up to 1960. Following Barry Goldwater's win in the county in 1964, it transitioned into a swing county until 2000. Since then, the county has remained reliably Republican.

For elections to the United States House of Representatives, Atkinson County is part of Georgia's 8th congressional district, currently represented by Austin Scott. For elections to the Georgia State Senate, Atkinson County is part of District 8. For elections to the Georgia House of Representatives, Atkinson County is part of District 176.

== See also ==
- National Register of Historic Places listings in Atkinson County, Georgia
- List of counties in Georgia
