= Pearson, Georgia =

- City
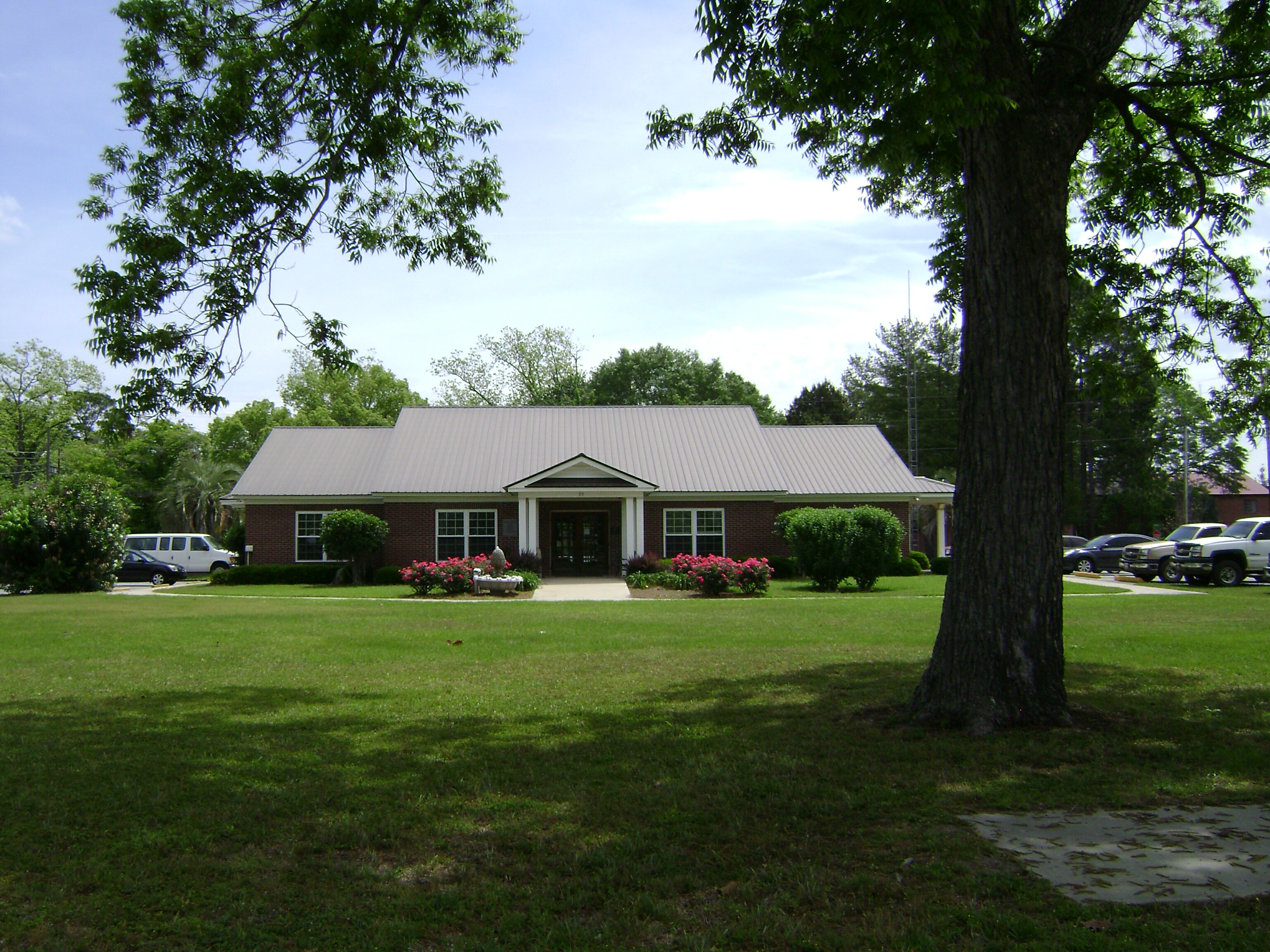
- Pearson City Hall and Police Department
- Motto: Visit for a day, or stay for a lifetime
- Location in Atkinson County and the state of Georgia
- Coordinates: 31°17′54″N 82°51′10″W
- Country: United States
- State: Georgia
- County: Atkinson
- Incorporated (city): Dec. 27, 1890

Area
  - Total: 3.36 sq mi (8.71 km^{2})
  - Land: 3.35 sq mi (8.68 km^{2})
  - Water: 0.0077 sq mi (0.02 km^{2})
- Elevation: 203 ft (62 m)

Population (2020)
  - Total: 1,821
  - Estimate (2022): 1,799
  - Density: 543.2/sq mi (209.73/km^{2})
- Time zone: UTC-5 (Eastern (EST))
  - Summer (DST): UTC-4 (EDT)
- ZIP code: 31642
- Area code: 912
- FIPS code: 13-59808
- GNIS feature ID: 0332626
- Website: www.pearson-ga.com

Pearson is a city in Atkinson County, Georgia, United States. The population was 1,821 in 2020. The city is the county seat of Atkinson County.

== History ==
Pearson was founded in 1875 as a depot on the Brunswick and Western Railroad. It was incorporated as a town in 1890 and in 1916 as a city. The community was named after Benajah Pearson, a veteran of the Second Seminole War.

== Geography ==
Pearson is located at 31°17′54″N 82°51′10″W (31.298368, -82.852827), within Southeast Georgia. According to the United States Census Bureau, the city has a total area of 3.4 square miles (8.7 km^{2}), of which 0.0077 square miles (0.02 km^{2}), or 0.28%, is water.

== Demographics ==
Historical population
Census	Pop.	Note	%±
1900	336		—
1910	558		66.1%
1920	792		41.9%
1930	712		−10.1%
1940	1,057		48.5%
1950	1,402		32.6%
1960	1,615		15.2%
1970	1,700		5.3%
1980	1,827		7.5%
1990	1,714		−6.2%
2000	1,805		5.3%
2010	2,117		17.3%
2020	1,821		−14.0%
U.S. Decennial Census

=== 2020 census ===
As of the 2020 census, Pearson had a population of 1,821. The median age was 35.4 years. 27.7% of residents were under the age of 18 and 12.8% of residents were 65 years of age or older. For every 100 females there were 94.8 males, and for every 100 females age 18 and over there were 92.1 males age 18 and over.

There were 669 households and 426 families in Pearson, of which 41.0% had children under the age of 18 living in them. Of all households, 36.6% were married-couple households, 22.7% were households with a male householder and no spouse or partner present, and 33.5% were households with a female householder and no spouse or partner present. About 26.3% of all households were made up of individuals, and 11.9% had someone living alone who was 65 years of age or older.

There were 755 housing units, of which 11.4% were vacant. The homeowner vacancy rate was 0.8% and the rental vacancy rate was 2.7%. 0.0% of residents lived in urban areas, while 100.0% lived in rural areas.

Pearson racial composition as of 2020
Race	Num.	Perc.
White (non-Hispanic)	533	29.27%
Black or African American (non-Hispanic)	553	30.37%
Native American	4	0.22%
Asian	8	0.44%
Pacific Islander	2	0.11%
Other/Mixed	40	2.2%
Hispanic or Latino	681	37.4%

== Education ==
Atkinson County students in K-12 grades are in the Atkinson County School District, which consists of two elementary schools (each includes a pre-school program) and a high school. The district has 102 full-time teachers and over 1,648 students as of 2010.

- Pearson Elementary School
- Willacoochee Elementary School
- Atkinson County Middle School
- Atkinson County High School

== Media ==
- WPNG Radio Shine 101.9

== Notable people ==
- Tyreek Hill, NFL player, raised in Pearson
