= Sibley Commission =

1960 committee to investigate desegregation in Georgia

Sixteen of the committee's nineteen members. Chairman John A. Sibley is seated fourth from the left.

The General Assembly Committee on Schools, commonly known as the Sibley Commission, was a committee created by the state government of Georgia in 1960 in order to study possible approaches to public school desegregation in the state. The committee consisted of 19 members and was led by its namesake, Atlanta businessman John A. Sibley.

In 1959, a federal judge ruled that the system of racial segregation in Atlanta's public schools was illegal based on the 1954 Supreme Court ruling in Brown v. Board of Education. While the Atlanta school system developed an incremental plan to allow for some token integration, this would have violated existing state laws barring integrated educational institutions from receiving public funding. Griffin Bell, the chief of staff for Georgia Governor Ernest Vandiver, proposed the idea of forming a committee to analyze the issue of desegregation and make recommendations to the state government on the matter. This committee would function as a blue-ribbon committee and was tasked with holding hearings throughout the state in order to gage the public's opinion on desegregation. For the hearings, Sibley, who would serve as the committee's chairman, decided to frame the question of desegregation as one of two choices: either following Georgia's existing laws that would result in defunding and the closure of public schools or allow for a "local option" plan where state laws would be changed to allow for each school district to decide for itself how it would handle school desegregation. Sibley promoted the local option plan as a legal path forward to both allow Atlanta to move forward with its limited integration while largely maintaining segregated educational institutions in the rest of the state.

During March 1960, the committee held hearings in each of the state's ten congressional districts and took testimony from roughly 1,800 witnesses, the majority of whom favored maintaining existing state laws that could have resulted in school closures. However, as these hearings were nonbinding, the committee instead drafted a majority report that largely promoted the local option plan and a minority report that promoted the existing system of massive resistance. In January 1961, following the reconvening of the General Assembly and the integration of the University of Georgia, the government adopted many of the recommendations, allowing Atlanta to become the first city in the Deep South to peacefully integrate its public schools. Summarizing the commission, University of Georgia historian Christopher Allen Huff wrote, "Although the Sibley Commission helped to prevent the violence that accompanied desegregation in other Deep South states, it also provided tactics that local school boards could use to slow down the desegregation process. As a result, serious attempts at desegregation across the state would not begin until the late 1960s".

== Background ==
=== Racial segregation in public schools ===
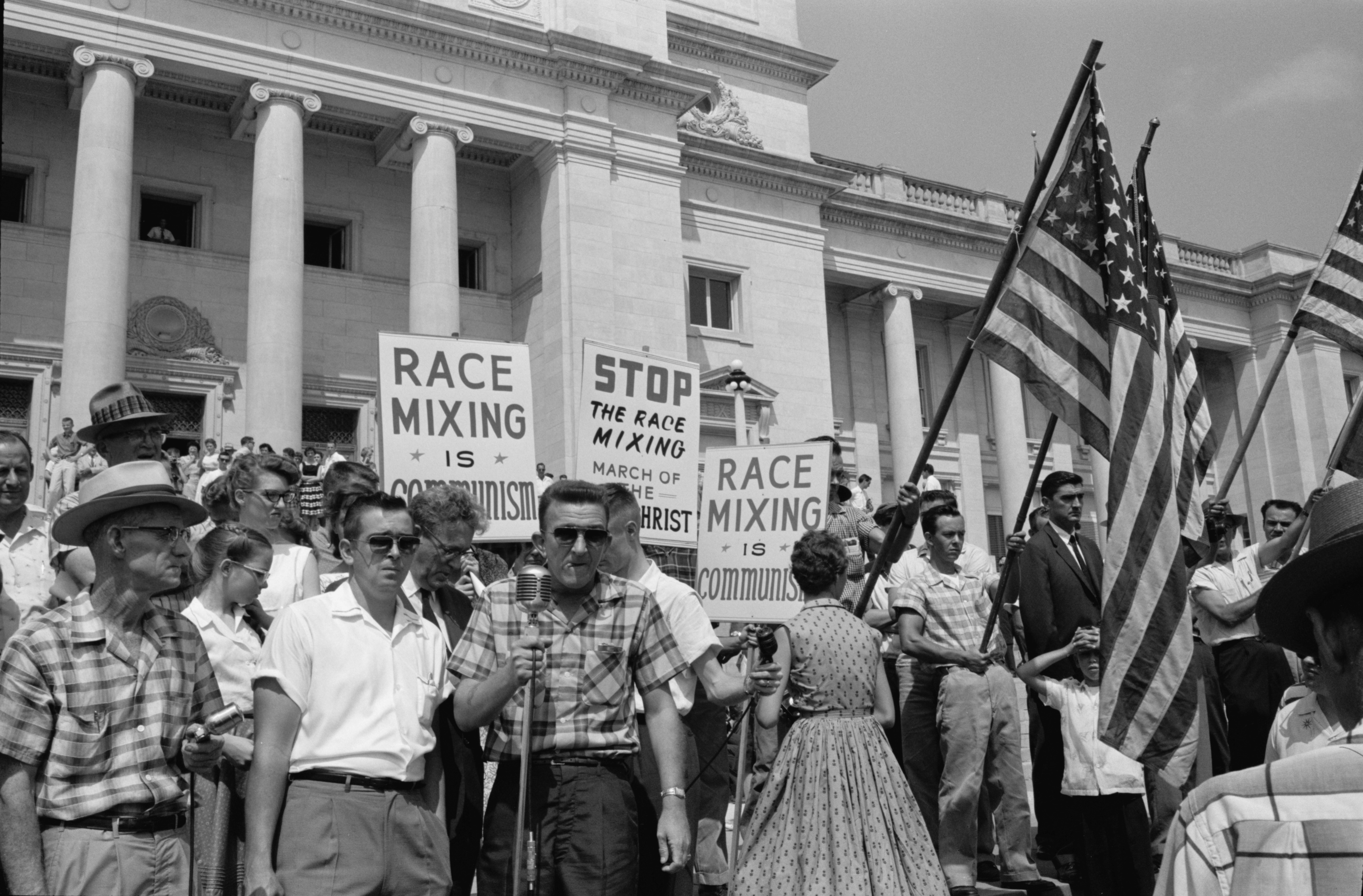
White American protestors against school integration at the Arkansas State Capitol in Little Rock, Arkansas, 1959

In 1954, the Supreme Court of the United States issued their landmark decision in the court case Brown v. Board of Education that racial segregation in public schools is unconstitutional. In response, conservative state politicians in the Southern United States adopted a policy of massive resistance where they passed a number of legislative acts designed to delay or outright stop attempts to integrate public schools. In Georgia, where historian Alton Hornsby Jr. described the state's general assembly as "overwhelmingly segregationist", legislators had previously approved a constitutional amendment in 1953 that would have cut state funding to any public institution that voluntarily integrated and converted those school districts from public systems to private schools, (Note: This constitutional amendment was proposed by Georgia legislators following a 1950 United States Supreme Court decision that outlawed racial segregation in graduate schools and law schools.) and in 1956, the state government passed additional legislation further outlining the transfer of public school property to private entities in the event of mandatory integration. Much of this legislation had been passed under the administration of Governor Marvin Griffin, who was succeeded by Ernest Vandiver in 1959. As part of his campaign, Vandiver promised to uphold the laws signed by Griffin that would have defunded integrated public institutions, often saying "no, not one" with regards to admitting African American students into white-only institutions.

=== Legal action against segregation in Georgia ===
Because of the ambiguous wording in the Brown case, individual school districts did not have to integrate until they were mandated to do so by a court order. (Note: In May 1955, as part of a series of hearings following the initial Brown case that is commonly referred to as Brown II, the U.S. Supreme Court ruled that states where segregated public schools existed would have to desegregate "with all deliberate speed". According to historian Jeff Roche, with this, the Supreme Court "left the task of interpreting their decision to the lower courts".) However, following the Little Rock Crisis in 1957, federal courts began to issue more decisions on school segregation cases that hastened integration. On January 11, 1958, 28 parents in Atlanta, selected by the local chapter of the NAACP filed a lawsuit (Calhoun v. Latimer) against the Atlanta Board of Education alleging that the board was enforcing racial segregation in Atlanta Public Schools in violation of the ruling in Brown. On June 5, 1959, presiding Federal Judge Frank Arthur Hooper ruled in favor of the plaintiffs and, later that month, he ordered the board to submit a desegregation plan by the following year. (Note: Sources vary on when Hooper demanded the school board to submit its integration plan. A 1998 book by historian Jeff Roche states that Hooper gave the board until December 1959, while a 1999 book by historian Thomas V. O'Brien states that the plan was due by January 1960.) In November 1959, the board submitted a plan that would have seen a limited integration of four of Atlanta's whites-only schools over several years, with one grade being desegregated per year. Despite having a very limited scope and not specifying an exact start date, Hooper approved the plan, which he felt satisfied the requirements set forth in Brown. The board's plan, however, meant that, without a change to existing legislation, Atlanta's public schools would either have to violate federal laws or violate state laws concerning integration, with the latter resulting in the defunding and closing of the school system. Because of this, Hooper postponed the plan's implementation until January 1960, when the Georgia General Assembly was scheduled to begin its legislative session, in order to give the state government time to change their laws barring any publicly funded integrated schools.

== Creation of a blue-ribbon committee ==
=== Griffin Bell's proposal ===
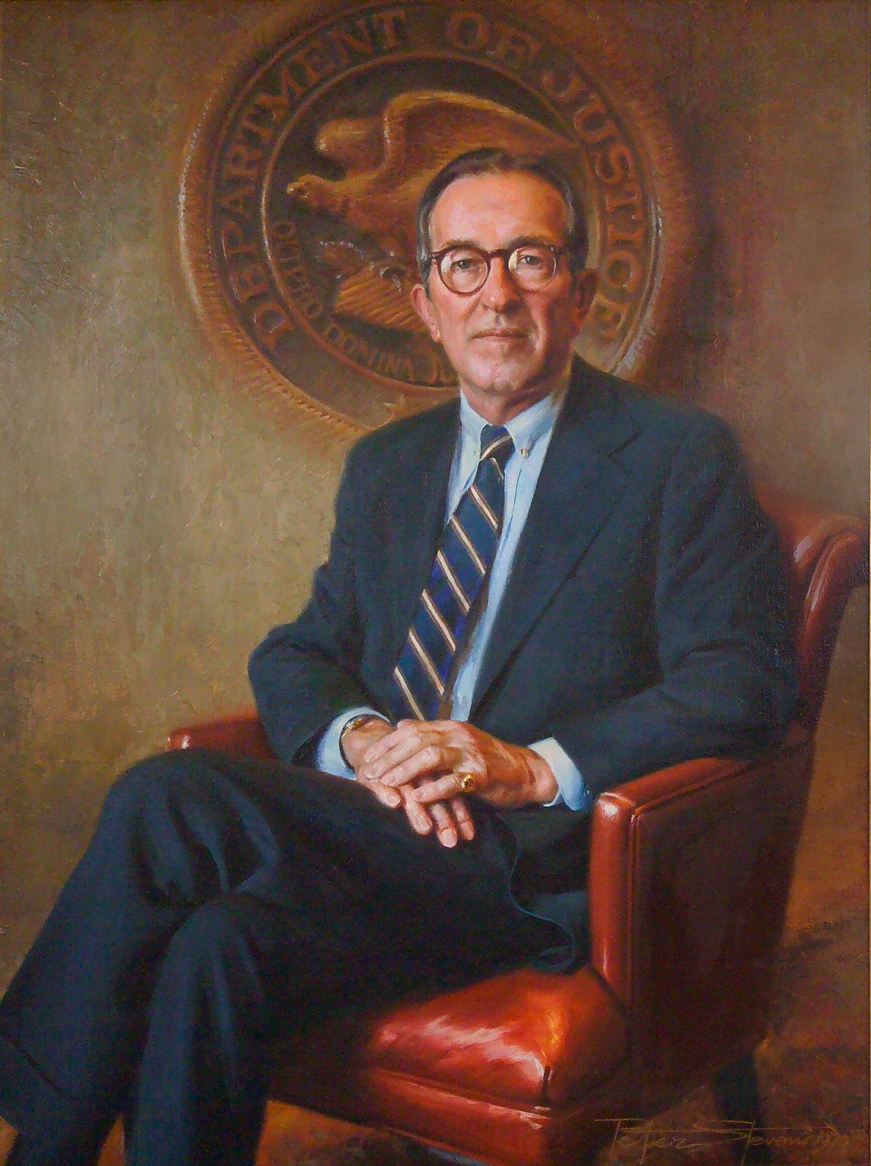
Griffin Bell (pictured c. 1977) served as Governor Ernest Vandiver's chief of staff and formulated the idea for the Sibley Commission.

Following Hooper's 1959 order that Atlanta's schools must desegregate, Governor Vandiver organized a five-member group of lawyers, headed by his Chief of Staff Griffin Bell, to act as his advisory panel on the issue of school segregation. The group traveled to other states in the Southern United States, such as Alabama and Virginia, to observe how they were handling similar court orders to integrate their public schools, though in Bell's opinion, "Nobody had any idea what to do". Upon returning to Georgia, Bell drafted a plan to create a commission, composed of leaders from parent–teacher associations (PTAs), union representatives, and members of the state's business and educational communities, that would travel throughout the state to gage the residents' opinions on school segregation and integration. (Note: While many sources state that the idea for the commission originated with Bell, historian Jeff Roche stated in a 1998 historical book on the Sibley Commission that George T. Smith, a former speaker of the Georgia House of Representatives, claims to have originated the idea for a commission to address the issue of integration.) Additionally, the committee's hearings would allow members of the public to air their grievances and would remove some of the pressure from elected officials, with Vandiver hoping that the hearings would spur citizens to demand a referendum on the issue. (Note: Concerning a referendum, historian Jeff Roche wrote in 1998, "The language of the bill [that created the committee] clearly indicates that Vandiver and those in the assembly preferred a popular vote on the school issue. In addition to relieving those in public office from deciding the school question, a vote in the form of a constitutional amendment (to overturn the private school amendment of 1954) would also put off implementing the Calhoun decision until sometime after the next general election in 1962".) Later commentators also state that a major goal of the committee was to convince the people of Georgia to back down on their hardline stances regarding segregation. (Note: In 1977, then-United States Senator Herman Talmadge of Georgia stated that the committee was created "for the purpose of educating the segregationists on the inevitability of public school desegregation". Additionally, in a 1996 book on the history of Atlanta, Frederick Allen stated, "Bell's commission would be a propaganda machine, bent on instructing Georgians about the futility of resisting the law of the land. Its purpose would be to get Vandiver off the hook by persuading voters that he ought to break his promise".) While the idea of a blue-ribbon committee to address desegregation was not unique to Georgia (precedence existed in the Gray Commission (1955) and Perrow Commission (1959) in Virginia and the Pearsall Committee (1955) in North Carolina), (Note: The similarities between the Georgia and Virginia commissions were such that, in 1969, historian Numan V. Bartley called the Sibley Commission "the Georgia equivalent of Virginia's Perrow Commission".) the Georgian commission would differ in that it would hold statewide hearings and take testimonies from both African Americans and white Americans.

While some of Vandiver's other advisors were against the idea, the governor personally supported it. Additionally, the idea was supported by the Atlanta Chamber of Commerce President Ivan Allen Jr. In choosing a leader for this committee, Vandiver chose John A. Sibley for the role. Sibley was a well-known local businessman and lawyer who had served as the chief counsel for The Coca-Cola Company, the president of the University of Georgia's alumni association, and the chairman of the Trust Company of Georgia. Sibley had previously worked for the law firm of King & Spalding, where Bell was the current managing partner, and Bell had personally recommended him for the position. In part, Sibley was selected by the governor and his advisors because of his opposition to school integration, and in correspondences between Sibley and Representative Carl Vinson, he expressed support for racial segregation in schools, which he justified in part with a concern over miscegenation. While Sibley was initially reluctant to take the position, he was swayed following a personal meeting with Vandiver where he was told he would have a role in selecting the other members of the commission.

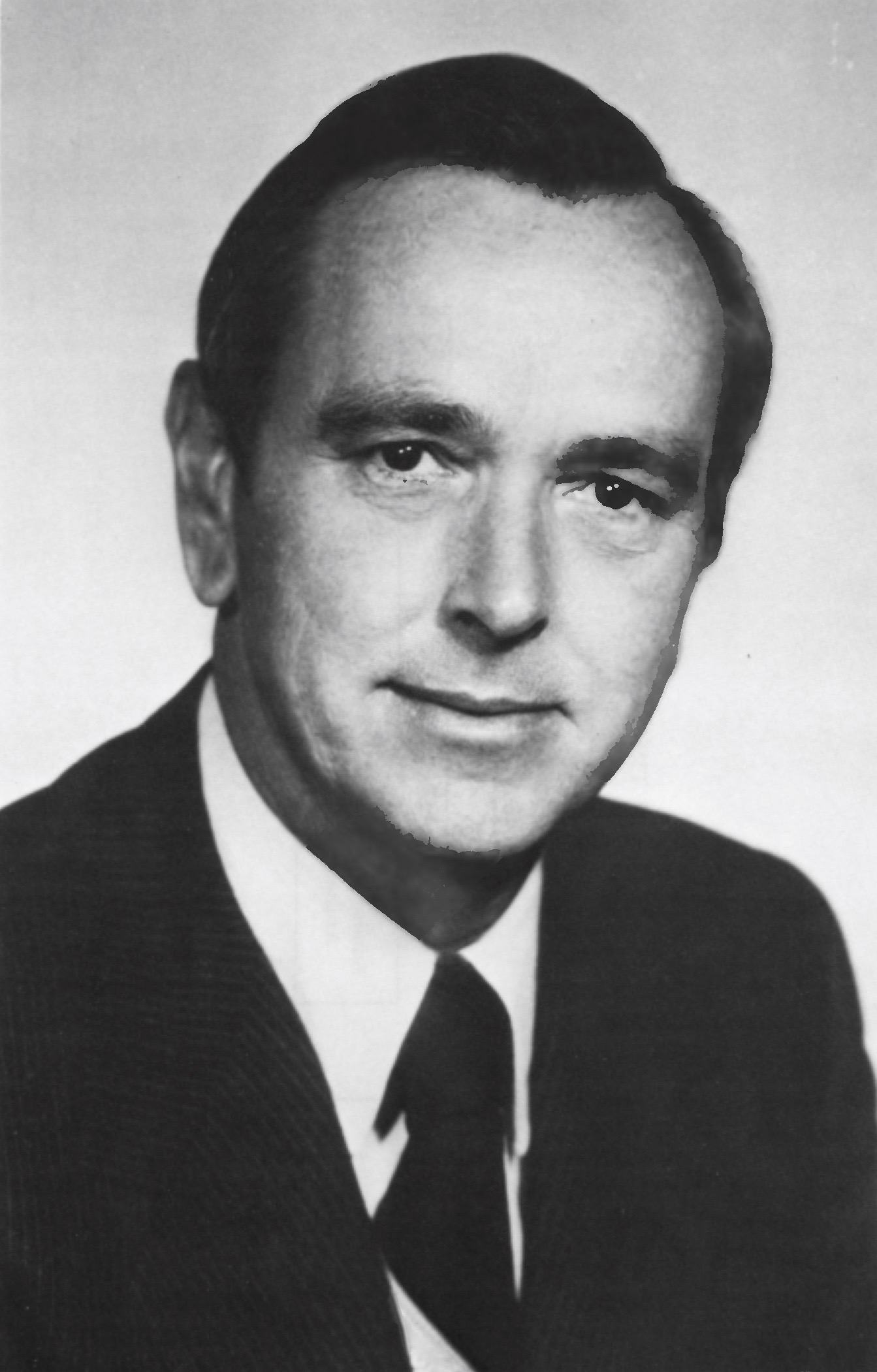
State representative George Busbee (pictured 1975) introduced legislation for the committee's creation.

To create the committee, Vandiver called upon Representative George Busbee to introduce legislation for its creation to the Georgia House of Representatives. Busbee was selected because he was from a small town and unaffiliated with leadership in the General Assembly, which Vandiver and his advisors believed would lend the commission an air of independence from the establishment. In late 1959, Vandiver visited Busbee's hometown of Albany and gave a copy of the bill to establish the committee to local Democratic Party leader and segregationist James H. Gray Sr., who passed the bill to Busbee and swore him to secrecy concerning the governor's involvement. Busbee was initially hesitant to introduce the bill, officially titled House Resolution 369–801, because he thought it would be political suicide. The committee was officially created by the state government in February 1960 with the title "General Assembly Committee on Schools", though it was commonly known as the Sibley Commission after its head. In a further effort to distance himself from the committee, Vandiver allowed the bill to become law without his signature.

=== Members ===
The commission included the following 19 individuals, all white men, who represented both chambers of the state legislature and many business and civic groups across the state.

Member	Occupation
John Sibley	President of the University of Georgia Alumni Association
John Duncan	President of the Georgia Farm Bureau Federation
John W. Greer Jr.	Member of the Georgia State Senate
Claude Purcell	Georgia State Superintendent of Schools
Homer Rankin	President of the Georgia Press Association
Zade Kenimer	Chairman of the Georgia Education Cabinet
Charles Cowan	President of the Georgia Municipal Association; Mayor of Cartersville
John Dent	President of the Georgia Chamber of Commerce
J. W. Keyton	Member of the Georgia County Commissioners Association
Samuel Boykin	President of the Superior Court Judges Association
Robert O. Arnold	Chairman of the Georgia Board of Regents; Mayor of Athens
Harmon White Caldwell	Chancellor of the University System of Georgia; Dean of the University of Georgia School of Law
Eulond Clary	Member of the Georgia State Senate
Wallace L. Jernigan	Member of the Georgia State Senate
Howell Hollis	Member of the Georgia House of Representatives
Render Hill	Member of the Georgia House of Representatives
Robert Battle Hall	Member of the Georgia House of Representatives
George B. Brooks	Member of the Georgia House of Representatives
Walstein Parker	Member of the Georgia House of Representatives

Additionally, the committee hired two personal secretaries, Patricia Pruitt and Ann Gaultney, and employed the services of Freeman Leverett, an attorney of constitutional law, as the group's counsel.

== Initial meetings ==
=== First meeting ===
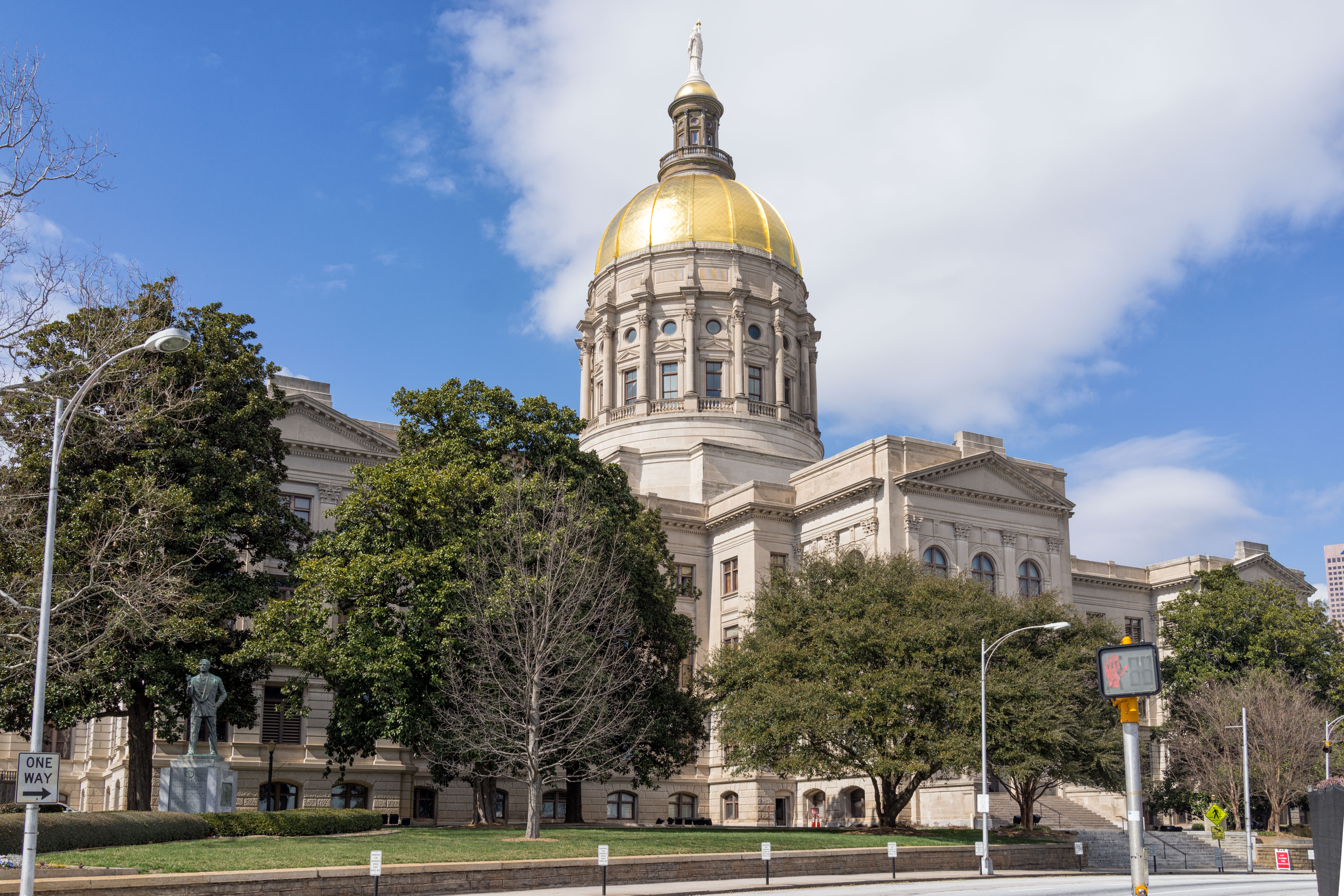
The commission held its first meeting on February 17, 1960, at the Georgia State Capitol (pictured 2014) in Atlanta.

On February 17, the committee held its first meeting and elected its officers, with Sibley as the chairman (and, unofficially, spokesperson), Duncan as the vice chairman, and Greer as the secretary. During this meeting, Sibley denounced the Brown decision as "devoid of legal reasoning", but accepted it as the rule of law and stressed the commission's goal in determining how Atlanta's schools would be desegregated. Ten hearings to be held in March 1960, one in each of Georgia's congressional districts, were also announced. In selecting the venues, which were segregated, emphasis was placed on selecting ones in central locations in each district. Additional hearings were also expected and would be held by subcommittees of the group. Following the hearings, the committee would then have to draft a report to the state government outlining their recommendations on addressing school integration, which was due by May 1. (Note: Concerning the deadline for the committee's report, multiple articles in The Atlanta Constitution state that the report was due by May 1. However, one article from March 14, 1960, gives a deadline date of May 3.)

As part of the hearings, the committee opted to allow representatives from civic groups, school boards, and other public organizations to have precedence and encouraged groups that were sending testifiers to poll their members and discuss the matter prior to the hearings so as to encourage good discourse. Individuals who were not speaking for a larger group would be allowed to testify as time permitted. While this first meeting was held at the Georgia State Capitol, the commission decided to hold future meetings at the Trust Company of Georgia's headquarters due to the presence of many reporters and journalists at the government building.

=== The "local option" proposal ===
On February 18, the committee's legal subcommittee, consisting of Boykin, Brooks, Hollis, Kenimer, and Sibley, met with Bell and Leverett to create the framework for the hearings, with the group deciding on two possible options to present to the people of Georgia: either continue with massive resistance at the expense of the state's public education system or allow for some limited integration while largely maintaining a segregated society. Ultimately, Sibley framed this second option as part of a "local option" proposal where local municipalities could determine for themselves how they would address the issue of school integration. In the hearings, Sibley would purposefully frame the discussions to favor the local option plan instead of the existing policy of massive resistance, and he would assure skeptics of the proposal that, unless legal action was brought against a specific school or school district, then the existing system of segregation would continue unimpeded. To support his belief, he highlighted recent events in Norfolk, Virginia, which had recently backtracked on plans to operate segregated private schools and had instead reopened their public schools as integrated institutions. As part of the local option proposal, a small number of African American students could be selected for enrollment in previously whites-only institutions at the expense of their parents. Regarding the proposal's legality, it was considered an acceptable choice per the wording of Hooper's rulings.

== Public hearings ==
Sibley and Greer developed the overall schedule for the hearings, which would run from March 3 through March 24. Additionally, Sibley drafted a speech wherein he expressed his disagreement with the Brown ruling, but stressed that it stood as the law of the land and highlighted the importance of the hearings in determining whether the state would continue with massive resistance or change state laws. The speech was roughly 30 minutes long and was planned to be read aloud at the start of each hearing. Regarding witnesses, Sibley requested that current members of the Georgia House of Representatives and Senate not testify. Also, prior to the start of the hearings, Sibley sent several lawyers, including committee members Caldwell and Hall, to other Southern states in order to further investigate their approaches to desegregation.

=== First hearing (Americus) ===
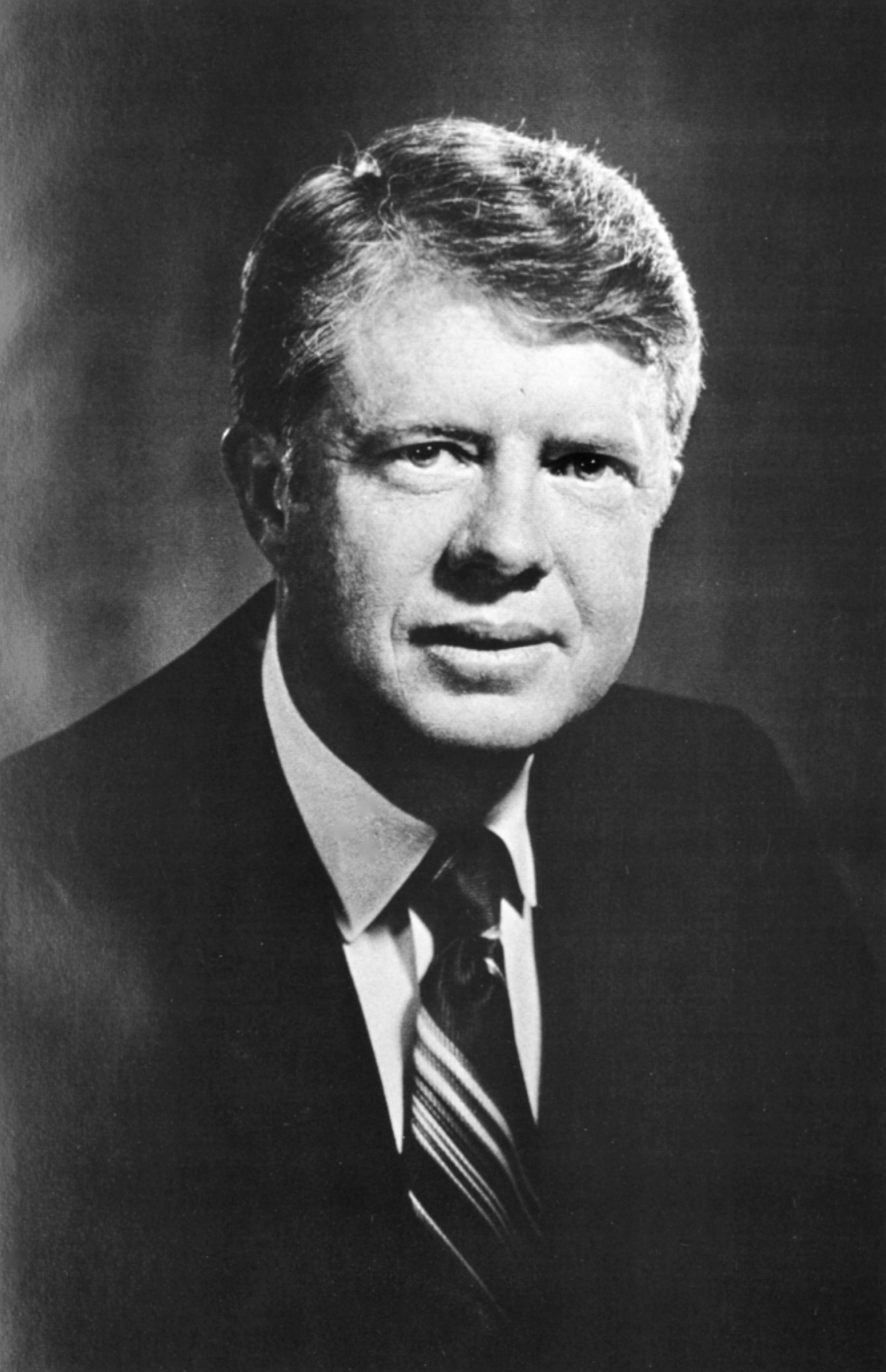
Future president of the United States Jimmy Carter (pictured 1971) attended the commission's first hearing in Americus.

On March 3, the commission held its first hearing at the Sumter County Courthouse in Americus, which was in Georgia's 3rd congressional district. Speaking later of the meeting, Sibley stated that he and Greer chose Americus as the location for the first meeting due to its large African American population and the hostility of the white American population there, arguing that if the committee could successfully hold a meeting there without a riot, then the rest of the state would be easier. Americus was located in the Black Belt region of Georgia, where most counties had an African American population of at least 45 percent. Of the twenty counties in the district, all but 6 had a student body population that was at least half African American. Twelve members of the city's police department kept the peace at the hearing.

The hearing began at 10 a.m. with Sibley's speech. The first person to speak before the commission was Charles F. Crisp, a banker and member of a local political family, (Note: See Charles F. Crisp and Charles R. Crisp.) who stated that he favored full closure of all public schools in the state rather than to allow Atlanta to follow through with its token integration plan. This set the tone for much of the rest of this hearing, as indicated by the testimony from a Columbus-based radio station that had found in a poll of 1,200 people that 1,192 were in favor of complete segregation, even if it meant public school closures. Both Jimmy Carter, who was a member of the Sumter County Board of Education, and his wife Rosalynn attended the Americus meeting, but neither spoke for unclear reasons. (Note: In a 2008 biography on Carter, historian Deanna L. Michael states that Carter may not have been invited to speak or declined to speak due to disagreements he had with his neighbors regarding school segregation. Journalist Calvin Trillin states that Carter speaking at the meeting may have resulted in political suicide, saying, "Jimmy Carter had an opportunity to testify before the Sibley Commission at Americus that, as a member of the Sumter County Board of Education, he was unwilling to preside over the abandonment of public education in the name of segregation, but if he had he would probably not now be the President of the United States".) The hearing was segregated, with black participants seated in a separate area of the courthouse. NAACP Field Secretary Amos Holmes, who arrived after the limited seating area was filled, was threatened with arrest if he did not leave the other areas of the courthouse.

In total, 66 people testified at Americus, with 52 preferring school closures to integration and five in favor of the local option. (Note: These numbers come from two historical books that discuss the Sibley Commission hearings. However, a contemporary news article from The Atlanta Constitution states that there were 57 witnesses in Americus, of which only 9 "had any reservations" regarding segregation at all costs.) The 52 represented community groups with a combined membership of 12,500, while the five represented a combined total of 23 people. Additionally, of the nine African Americans who testified, all but one favored maintaining the current system of segregation. (Note: For the first two hearings, African Americans who testified were not asked for a preference on either maintaining state laws or changing them in favor of a local option plan, but instead were asked if they were in favor of integrated or segregated schools.This difference in questioning drew criticism from some African American activists, and starting with the third hearing, Sibley would change his questioning to be consistent for white and black testifiers.) The NAACP later issued a statement that these witnesses had been under pressure from white school board members in the district to take these pro-segregation stances, which were widely promoted by segregationists in South Georgia such as former governor Griffin. Sibley himself was surprised by the overwhelming support that massive resistance had among the white people in the district.

=== Second hearing (Washington) ===
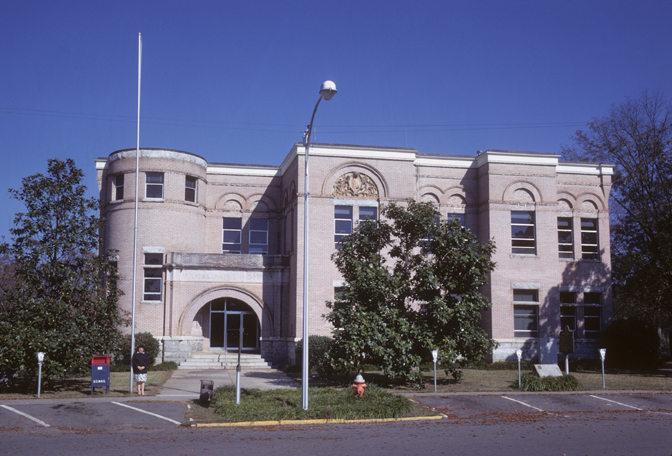
The committee's second hearing was held at the Wilkes County Courthouse (pictured 1969) in Washington.

The commission held its second hearing on March 7 in Washington, part of Georgia's 10th congressional district. Approximately 500 people attended the meeting at the Wilkes County Courthouse. Based on the results of the Americus hearing, Sibley and the committee tried to get more civic groups involved in the hearings, and as a result, the Washington hearings were much less one-sided than the first hearing had been. As an example, the first witness, Mayor Edward Pope of Washington, spoke in favor of the existing laws, while the second witness, a representative from the Washington Women's Club, was in favor of the local option. During the hearings, many groups representing educators and students, industry groups, church groups, and the League of Women Voters spoke in favor of the local option. Concerning the University of Georgia, which was located in the district, one group presented a petition in favor of the local option that had signatures from 838 students, while a poll of 279 professors showed that 252 favored the local option. However, massive resistance was by far the more popular option expressed by groups representing the district's rural population, including farm bureaus and local social organizations.

In total, 99 people testified, with 50 favoring the local option and 34 favoring massive resistance. The remainder either did not express a preference or were African American testifiers who were not asked to state an opinion on the two options. A large portion of the local option advocates were from Clarke County, where the university is located. The division of opinion was largely one of rural vs. urban respondents, and, according to historian Jeff Roche, the greater support for the local option in this district compared to the 3rd congressional district can be attributed to the district's lower overall African American population, which was roughly three-quarters that of the 3rd district. One notable witness at the hearings was Roy V. Harris of Augusta, a white supremacist politician who was a member of the Georgia Board of Regents and president of Georgia's state equivalent of a Citizens' Council. (Note: Citizens' Councils were pro-segregationist grassroots organizations that were popular in many southern states following the Brown decision. According to historian Jeff Roche, the councils "never caught on in Georgia", and Georgia's council (called the States' Rights Council of Georgia), under Harris's leadership, functioned primarily as an "arm in the state Democratic Party" than as its own organization.)

=== Third hearing (Cartersville) ===
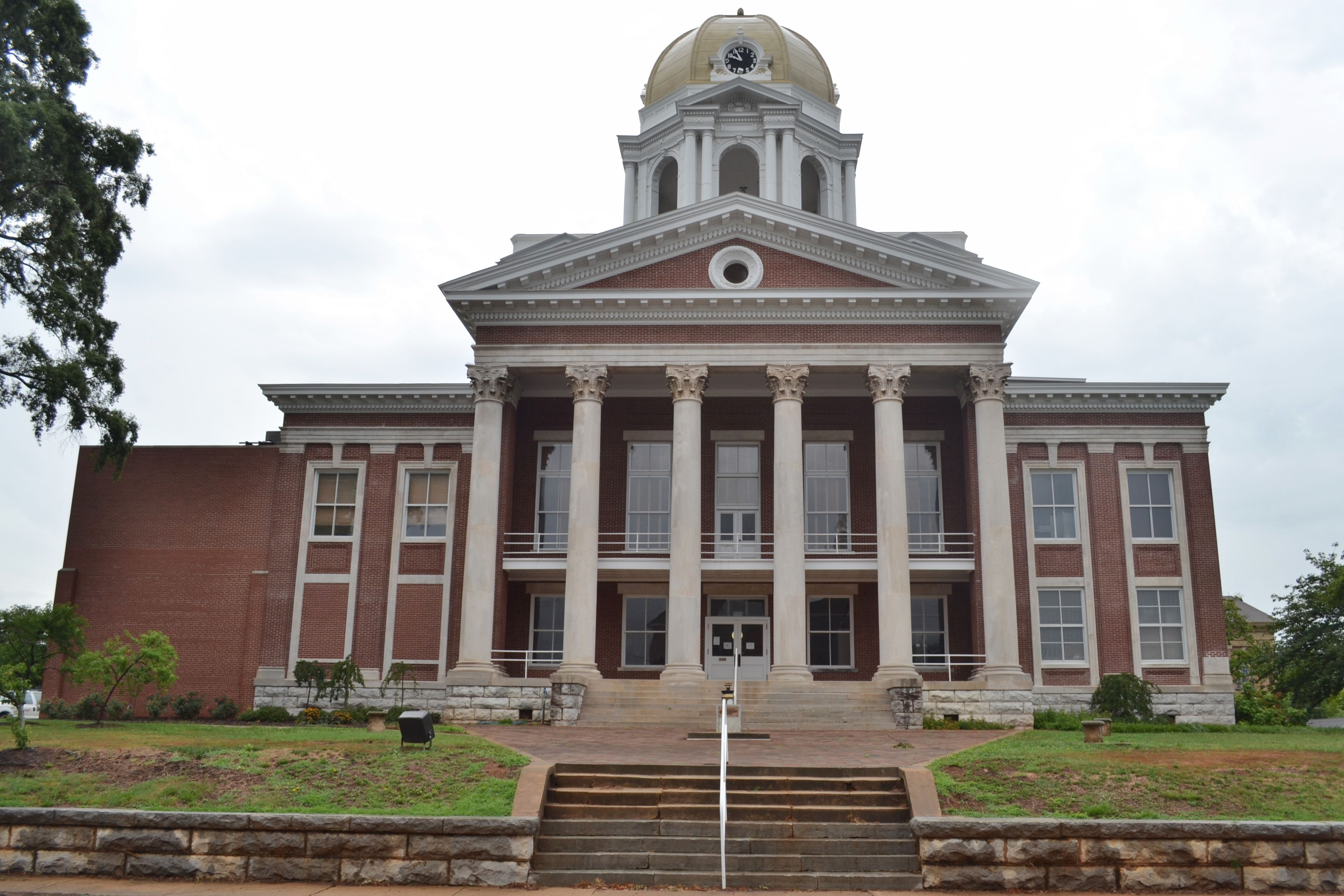
The committee's third hearing was held at the Bartow County Courthouse (pictured 2011) in Cartersville.

The commission's third hearing was held at the Bartow County Courthouse in Cartersville, part of the state's 7th congressional district, on March 10. In spite of a snowstorm that struck much of the district and the broader North Georgia region, the hearing saw about 400 people pack the courthouse. Sibley began the hearing by reading statements from Judge Hooper, who had recently ordered a delay in the implementation of his orders in Calhoun v. Latimer in order to allow the commission to conduct its business, who expressed approval of the committee.

The 7th district saw a much smaller African American population than the previous two districts, which Sibley used to his advantage in promoting the local option plan by pointing out that, under current state laws, mandatory school closures would also affect five counties in the district that were all-white. The local option plan proved much more popular here than in the previous two districts, with largescale support from the district's industry, including its strong textile industry. However, in a break from the stance taken by many of the country's national labor unions, many local unions were opposed to any form of integration, and together with farm organizations, they constituted some of the strongest opposition to the local option plan. Despite this, the overwhelming majority of witnesses (60 of the 80 who testified) spoke in favor of the local option plan. Only five groups spoke in favor of the massive resistance option: an American Legion chapter and a farm bureau from Polk County, a pro-segregationist group from Cobb County, and two labor union organizations.

=== Fourth hearing (LaGrange) ===
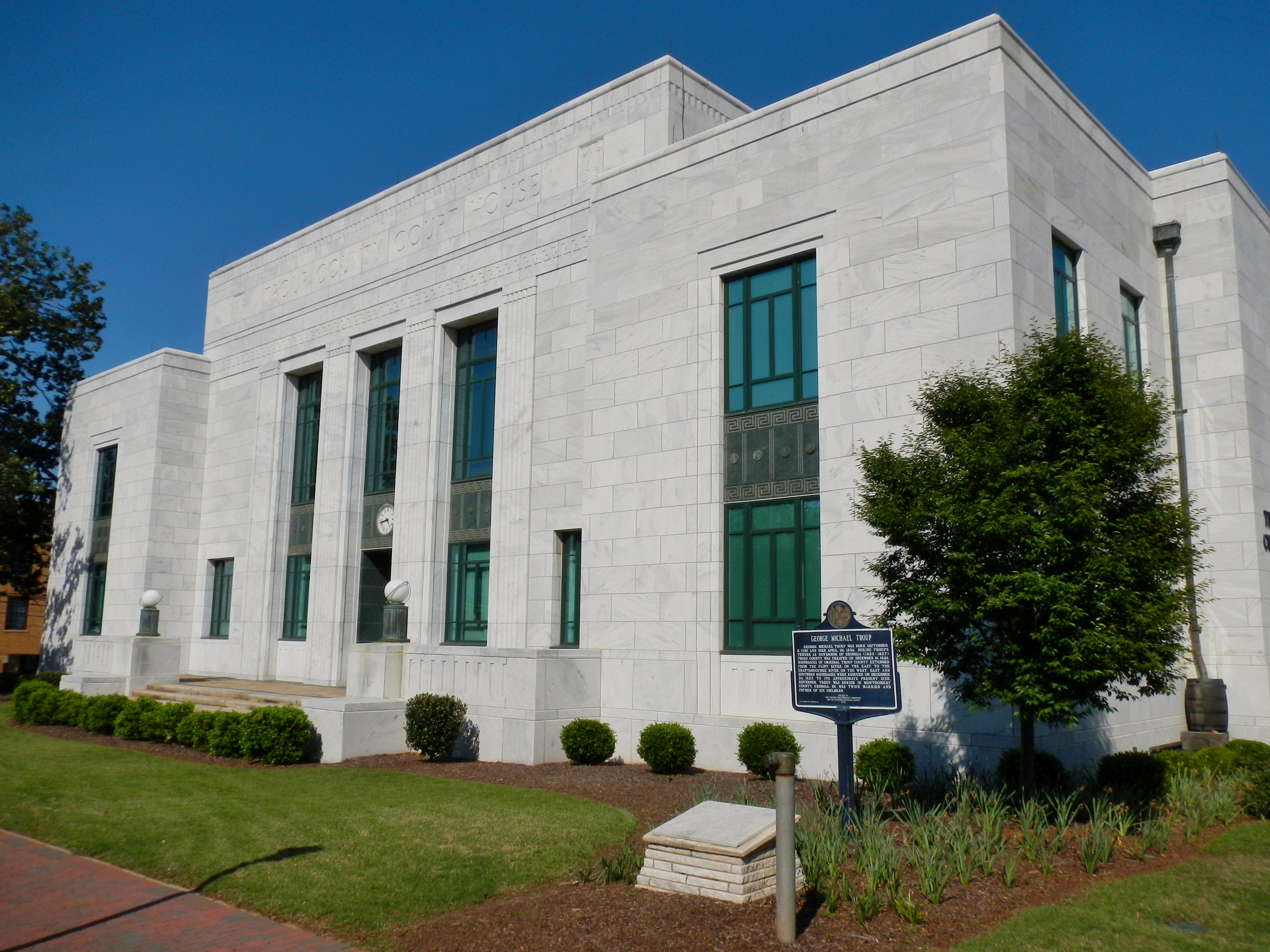
The committee's fourth hearing was held at the Troup County Courthouse (pictured 2012) in LaGrange.

The committee's fourth hearing was held on March 11 in LaGrange, part of Georgia's 4th congressional district, and saw roughly 700 people fill the Troup County Courthouse. Duncan read the opening statement, as Sibley arrived late due to snow, and the meeting commenced with testimony from the leader of the city's board of education. With feedback from the previous meetings, Sibley reworked his approach to explaining the local option plan and stressed the successes that similar programs had seen in Alabama and North Carolina. He also highlighted the fact that, under the local option plan, local municipalities would probably not face legal actions if they opted to maintain their existing systems of segregated schools. Overall however, the testifiers in the 4th district were fairly divided on the issue. During the morning session, 17 of 23 witnesses testified that they were in favor of the local option plan, though after a strong segregationist showing in the afternoon session, the overall results for the meeting were 47 people in favor of the local option and 41 in favor of continued massive resistance.

=== Fifth hearing (Douglas) ===
The commission's fifth hearing was held on March 14 before a crowd of over 700 people in the Douglas High School gymnasium in Douglas, part of the state's 8th congressional district. Instead of his normal speech, Sibley instead opened this meeting with a more informal discussion on school desegregation and how the committee would ultimately make its final decision, which, according to Roche, signaled to some in the general public Sibley's preference for the local option.

Given the district's demographics racial composition, (Note: The district was largely rural, with the exceptions of the cities of Brunswick and Valdosta. Additionally, it had a large white and small African American population, with several counties having the lowest percentage of African Americans of any Georgia counties south of the Atlantic Seaboard Fall Line.) the commission believed that the witnesses would testify primarily in favor of the local option plan. However, it was in Douglas that organized groups that strongly opposed school integration, such as several local Citizens' Councils and the Ku Klux Klan (KKK), decided to take a stand and have their opinion recorded, resulting in the commission hearing 148 witnesses in five hours. In later meetings, these groups would attempt to sway the outcomes of the hearings by holding rallies at the hearing locations the night before they were to take place and by trying to coerce PTA groups and other witnesses they believed would support the local option from not attending. In total, the Douglas hearing revealed a strong support for maintaining massive resistance, with 83 testifying in favor of that versus 65 against. (Note: This value comes from historian Jeff Roche's 1998 book Restructured Resistance, which is about the Sibley Commission's hearings. However, contemporary reporting from The Atlanta Constitution gives slightly different values of 82 in favor of segregation and 64 against.)

=== Sixth hearing (Sandersville) ===
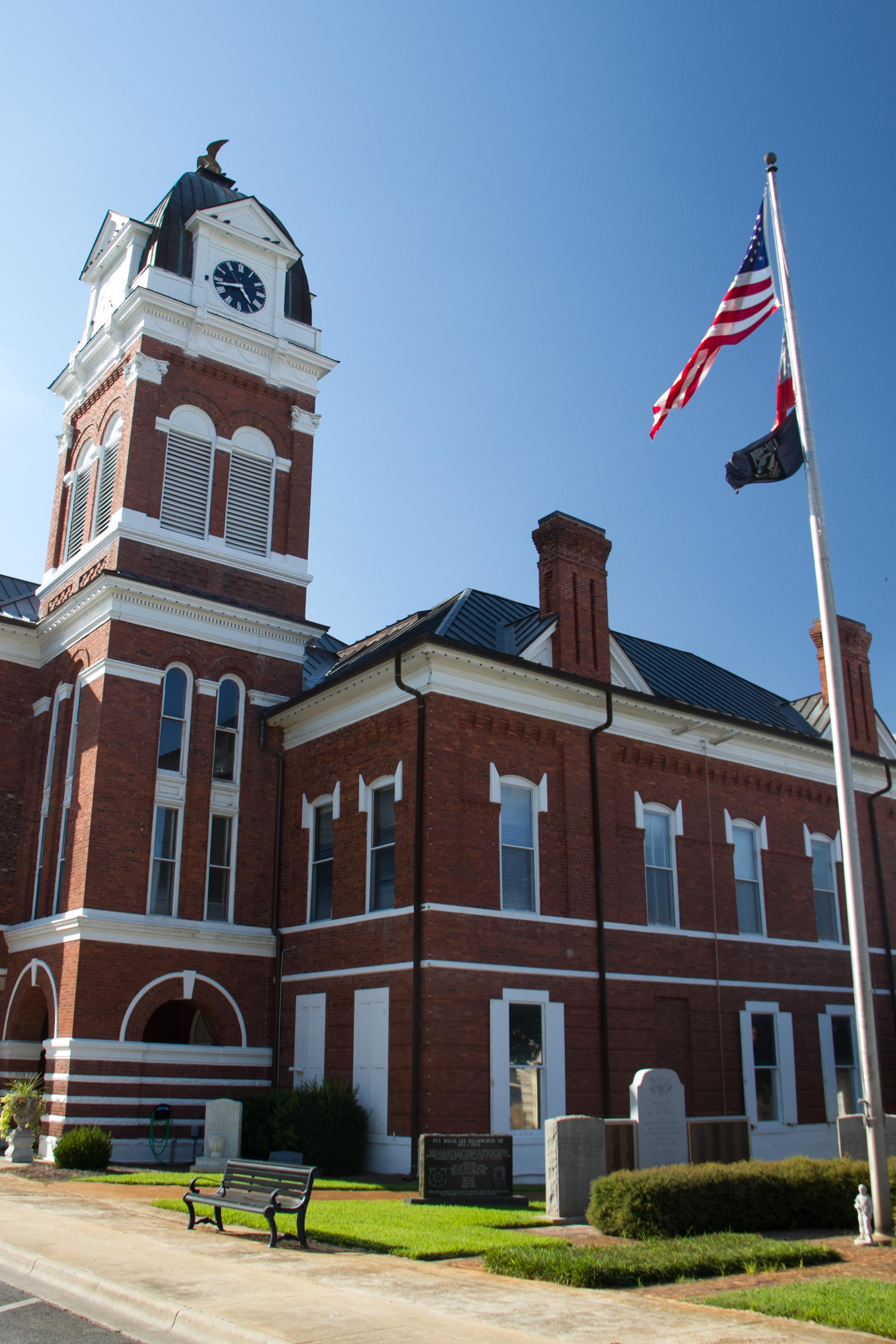
The committee's sixth hearing was held at the Washington County Courthouse (pictured 2014) in Sandersville.

The committee's sixth hearing was held at the Washington County Courthouse in Sandersville, in Georgia's 6th congressional district, on March 16. The same week of the hearing, the Atlanta sit-ins and the Savannah Protest Movement, both part of the much larger sit-in movement of the civil rights movement, began in Georgia, which would influence much of the discussion in this and subsequent hearings. According to contemporary coverage in The Atlanta Constitution, this hearing was "the longest and most contentious" one up to that time. Prior to the hearing, former General Assembly member Harvey Roughton of Washington County had worked to organize a large showing from pro-segregation groups that included veterans' organizations, farm bureaus, and, unlike in previous hearings, several church groups and PTAs. The Sandersville hearings also saw statements from several Citizens' Councils and Grand Dragon Lee Davidson of a KKK organization.

Overall, the committee heard from 160 witnesses in Sandersville, with 97 voicing support for continued massive resistance, 54 advocating for the local option, and 9 not expressing a preference for either option. As in other hearings, this outcome had been expected based on the sizable African American population in the district, with black students outnumbering white students in all but four of the district's counties. Further concerning the counties, 12 of the district's 16 had representatives who favored massive resistance, with only Baldwin, Bibb, Laurens, and Putnam, advocating for the local option. Bibb County witnesses were largely supportive of the local option and included PTA members, the League of Women Voters, and faculty and students of Mercer University and Wesleyan College, both located in Macon. Regarding the noticeable divide between rural and urban views at the hearings, one witness from rural Jefferson County said, "those who have voted for [the local option] live where the street cars run".

=== Seventh hearing (Sylvania) ===
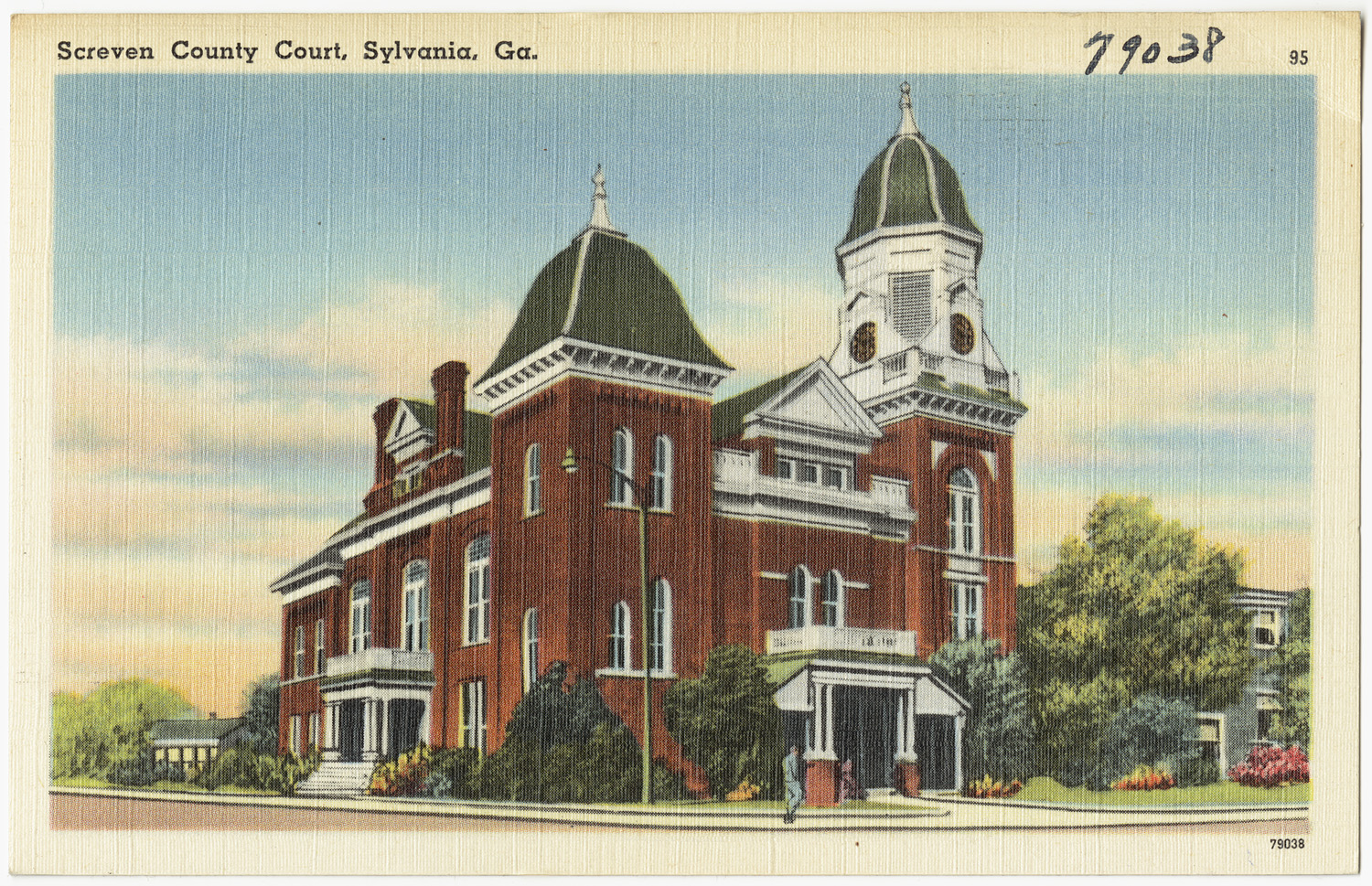
The committee's seventh hearing was held at the Screven County Courthouse (pictured c. 1930–1945) in Sylvania.

The committee's seventh hearing was held on March 17 at the Screven County Courthouse in Sylvania, part of the state's 1st congressional district. This hearing was originally planned to be held in Savannah, the state's second-largest city, but it was moved to the more centrally located Sylvania at the request of committee member Parker. Concerning the racial demographics of the district, African Americans constituted 40 percent of the population and were in the majority in five counties. Additionally, Savannah had a strong and politically active NAACP chapter that had just recently initiated a sit-in and boycott at the time of the hearing. Also, several of the coastal counties had higher than average voter registration for African Americans, with Liberty County being the only county in the Southern United States where black voters outnumbered white voters.

Sibley began the hearing, which was attended by about 800 people, with a few prepared statements, including a recognition of attendance of Speaker of the Georgia House George L. Smith, who had helped to create the committee. During the morning session, the committee heard 86 witnesses, almost all of whom supported closing the schools rather than allowing any form of integration whatsoever. Following the trend in the previous hearings, these witnesses were primarily from rural areas and included a growing number of Citizens' Councils and KKK members. The afternoon session saw testimony from more local option and integration proponents. W. W. Law, a civil rights activist in Chatham County, had temporarily suspended the Savannah boycott in order to lead a delegation of 13 other NAACP activists to the hearing. In his statements before the committee, Law called for an immediate end to segregation, which annoyed Sibley. Similar sentiments were echoed by a majority of the NAACP members, including activist Hosea Williams, who called for an immediate end to segregation. Their testimony led to boos from the audience and a call for order from Sibley.

In total, of the 214 witnesses interviewed, 150 supported massive resistance, 49 supported the local option plan, 14 people supported full integration, and one African American witness voiced his support for segregation, but offered no further opinion on the questions. Chatham County proved to be the only county in the district to voice an overwhelming support for the local option, as evidenced from further testimony from the Savannah chapters of the American Association of University Women and B'nai B'rith, among other groups. However, the counties of Bryan, Long, and McIntosh, which all had high rates of black voter registration, were not represented at the hearing at all. In addition to Law and Williams, some other notable witnesses at this hearing included state politician Hugh Gillis, who voted for segregation, and Bishop Albert R. Stuart of the Episcopal Diocese of Georgia, who voted for the local option.

=== Eighth hearing (Moultrie) ===
The committee's eighth hearing took place on March 21 in Moultrie, part of Georgia's 2nd congressional district. While the committee had initially planned to hold the hearing at the Colquitt County Courthouse, the size of the audience caused the hearing to be moved to the gymnasium of Moultrie High School, where slightly under 1,300 filled the venue. The witnesses at this hearing overwhelmingly favored massive resistance, which was due in part to the actions of local politicians. The previous month, all of the Georgia General Assembly members from this district had signed a manifesto in support of maintaining current state laws, and several Democratic politicians had participated in a motorcade the morning of the hearing that transported massive resistance supporters from Bainbridge to Moultrie. Even Busbee, the politician who had introduced the committee bill to the legislature, called the local option plan "hogwash" and a "diversionary tactic". Additionally, many African American witnesses in the district voiced their opinion in favor of continued segregation, in part due to many newly built black school facilities in the area. In total, slightly under half of the school-age population of the district was African American.

In total, of the 252 witnesses, 207 were in support of continued massive resistance, 44 were in favor of the local option, and one person offered no opinion on either option. All 14 of the counties represented in the district voiced a majority opinion in favor of massive resistance, and the only source of local option support came from some of the larger cities in the district, such as Albany, Tifton, and Thomasville. Several of the counties in the district offered no witnesses who were in favor of the local option. Several historians note that the Moultrie hearing represented a final push by segregationists to sway the committee's results, as many expected the last two hearings after this one, in Atlanta and Gainesville, to result in large support for the local option.

=== Ninth hearing (Atlanta) ===
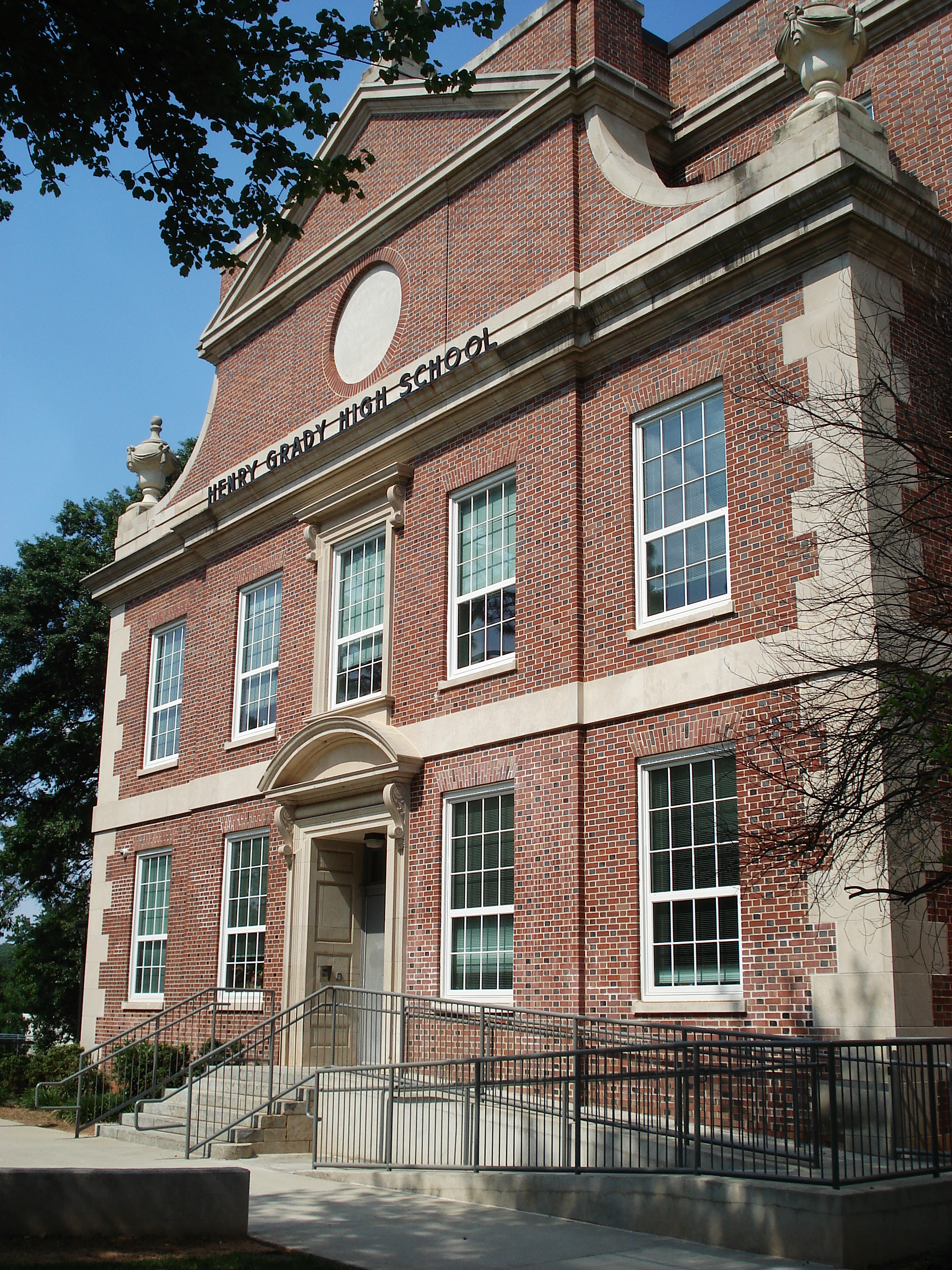
The committee's ninth hearing was held in the gymnasium of Henry W. Grady High School (pictured 2008) in Atlanta.

The committee's ninth hearing was held in Atlanta, part of the state's 5th congressional district, on March 23. Unlike in other hearings, where a large portion of the witnesses registered to testify the day of the hearing, the committee was flooded with witness requests several days prior, with roughly 100 people registering prior to the event. Greer, who was in charge of scheduling witnesses, stated that a representative from the Atlanta Board of Education would be the first to speak and that school officials from all three of the counties represented in the district (DeKalb, Fulton, and Rockdale) would be among the first to speak. The selected venue was the gymnasium of Henry W. Grady High School in Midtown Atlanta, (Note: In 2020, the Atlanta Board of Education voted to change the name of the school to Midtown High School.) which was expected to hold between 1,500 and 1,800 people. In preparation for the event, students were given the day off from school. In the leadup to the hearing, local publications in Atlanta favored the local option policy. Both members of the Atlanta Police Department and plainclothes officers of the Georgia Bureau of Investigation were on site in order to keep the peace. Prior to the hearing, a representative from the U.S. Klans was removed from the school property after trying to hand out anti-integration flyers.

Before a crowd of roughly 1,200 people, with reporters from around the country present, Sibley opened the hearing with testimony from A. C. Latimer, the president of the Atlanta Board of Education and the defendant in the Calhoun v. Latimer lawsuit. Latimer defended the board of education's integration plan and spoke strongly in favor of the local option, questioning the ability of a private school system to effectively handle the 115,000 students currently enrolled in Atlanta's public schools. Following Latimer, representatives for DeKalb County's public schools similarly questioned the ability of a private system to adequately address the needs of the district's 42,000 pupils. Many of the morning session's witnesses spoke in favor of keeping schools open at all costs. Groups supporting open schools included several major religious organizations, two Republican Party groups, both the Atlanta Chamber of Commerce and the Junior Chamber of Commerce, and school groups, such as PTAs and representatives of local school districts, among others.

Following the lunch break, the afternoon session included some heated testimony from several massive resistance supporters, including politician Lester Maddox. The crowd's raucous behavior during some pro-segregation witnesses' testimony that Sibley threatened to remove the audience and hold the remainder of the hearings with only the committee and the witnesses. It was following the testimony of a hardline segregationist that, in the only notable instant of near-physical confrontation during the hearings, Sibley fended off a man who had grabbed his sleeve while trying to grab the microphone near him. Groups supporting the possible closure of schools included a local union of the United Auto Workers, the state affiliate of the Constitution Party, several KKK organizations, and the Metropolitan Association for Continuing Segregated Education.

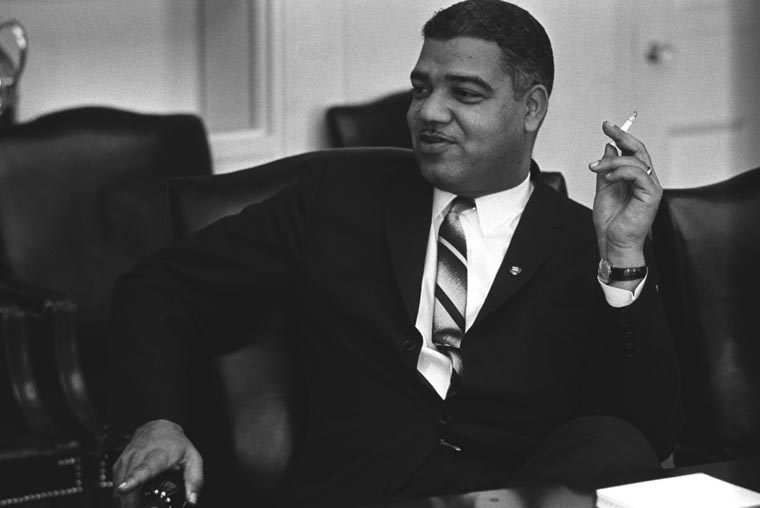
Whitney Young (pictured 1964) was one of several African American civil rights activists who testified in Atlanta.

The afternoon session ended with testimony from several witnesses from Atlanta's black elite, including William Holmes Borders, John Wesley Dobbs, and Whitney Young, who all spoke in favor of the local option. The last witness to speak was Donald L. Hollowell, an attorney representing the plaintiffs in Calhoun v. Latimer. Due to the large number of witnesses and the limited time they had left, Sibley decided to end the hearing at 4 p.m. and schedule a supplementary hearing for March 31 in order to allow those who did not testify a chance to speak. In total, roughly 150 people who had registered to speak as witnesses were unable to do so and invited to this second hearing.

In total, the committee interviewed 114 witnesses and found 85 in favor of the local option plan. These witnesses primarily represented groups, primarily based in Atlanta, with a total membership of over 100,000. Of the 28 witnesses who spoke in favor of possibly closing public schools, many spoke on their own behalf and did not represent a larger organization. Additionally, 14 witnesses (11 African American and 3 white) spoke in favor of full integration. Of the five witnesses from Rockdale County, 3 favored the local option while 2 favored massive resistance.

=== Tenth hearing (Gainesville) ===
The committee's tenth hearing was held in Gainesville, in Georgia's 9th congressional district, on March 24. Due in large part to the small African American population in the district, The Atlanta Constitution wrote that the district was expected to have a majority support for the local option. As this was the last of the initial ten hearings that the committee had scheduled, it was expected that the state's congressional districts would be split, with five supporting the local option and five supporting massive resistance. On the day of the hearing, the only sizable support for the massive resistance option came from representatives from the counties of Barrow and Jackson, which contained some of the largest African American populations in the district and were largely rural and agricultural regions. However, the overwhelming consensus in the 18-county district was support for the local option. Of the witnesses interviewed, 141 voiced support for the local option, while only 36 supported possible school closures, representing the strongest margin of victory for the local option in any of the districts. Aside from Barrow and Jackson, almost all of the other counties had a majority of their representatives voice support for the local option, with the only exceptions being the counties of Banks, Gwinnett, and Union, where the two options tied. In Hall County, where Gainesville is located, 50 witnesses supported the local option and 4 supported possible school closings. Concerning the crowd reactions at the hearing, reporter Bruce Galphin of The Atlanta Constitution said they were "probably the most orderly" of all of the hearings.

=== Subcommittee hearings (Atlanta and Columbus) ===
On March 31, the committee divided into two subcommittees and held supplemental hearings in the cities of Atlanta and Columbus, (Note: For the subcommittee hearings, 13 committee members were present at the Atlanta hearing while 6 hosted the Columbus hearing. The committee members in Atlanta were Sibley, Arnold, Boykin, Brooks, Caldwell, Cowan, Dent, Greer, Hall, Keyton, Parker, Purcell, and Rankin, while the committee members present in Columbus were Duncan, Clary, Hill, Hollis, Jernigan, and Kenimer.) the latter of which being the largest city in the 3rd district. The second Atlanta hearing, which was chaired by Sibley, was held because of a lack of time to allow all of the registered witnesses at the initial hearing to testify, while the Columbus hearing, which was chaired by Duncan, was held due to pressure from Columbus citizens and pro-local option activists who felt that the people of Columbus had not been fairly represented during the hearing in Americus. Similar criticisms had been leveled at the committee's choice to hold their hearings in smaller cities and not the most populous cities in the district, most notably with regards to the decision to hold the 1st district hearing in Sylvania instead of Savannah.

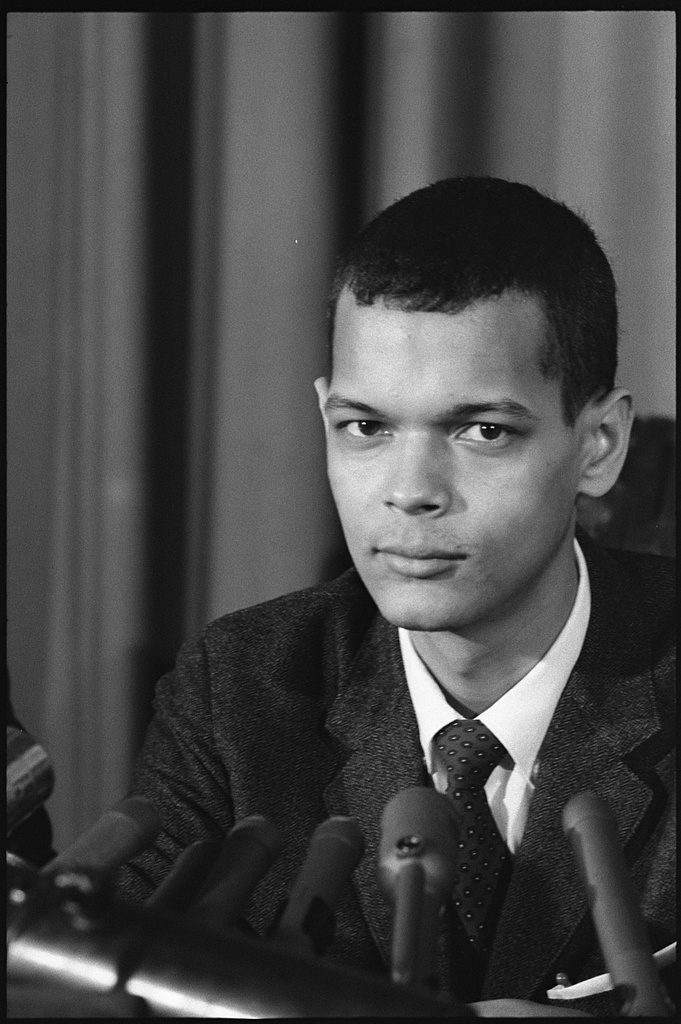
Civil rights activist Julian Bond (pictured 1966) testified on behalf of the students of the Atlanta University Center.

At the second Atlanta hearing, which was held at the same venues as the first, Sibley, rather than allowing for speeches from the witnesses, simply asked them to state their preferences, with 71 people supporting the local option and 49 opposed. Many of the local option supporters included representatives from colleges in the area, including Agnes Scott College, Oglethorpe University, the Georgia Institute of Technology, and the Atlanta University Center. Representing the roughly 4,000 students from the latter, Julian Bond, an activist who was at the time a college student, testified in favor of open schools.

In Columbus, roughly 300 people attended the hearing, which was held at the Muscogee County Courthouse. As with many of the other hearings, the main divide was between the urban and rural witnesses, with the former preferring the local option and the latter favoring massive resistance. One of the biggest outcomes of the hearing was the Columbus chamber of commerce joining the Atlanta chamber of commerce in supporting the local option. On the other side, opponents of the local option included labor unions, agricultural organizations, and representatives from Citizens' Councils and the KKK. During the testimony from one KKK representative who was opposed to any form of integration, Duncan jokingly asked if they had taken a poll of their members. The Columbus hearing also boasted the largest number of African American witnesses at any of the hearings, with 17 testifying and about 75 more in attendance. All but one testified in favor of the local option, while 11 of them also testified in favor of full integration. The one African American witness who voiced support for continued segregation elicited boos from many African American spectators. In total, out of 95 witnesses in Columbus, 58 supported the local option while 37 were opposed.

=== Results of the hearings ===
The hearings made national headlines, and reporting on the hearings from WSB-TV, Atlanta's NBC affiliate which sent a cameraman to every hearing, was sometimes broadcast on NBC's national news program. In total, the Sibley Commission heard from 1,800 witnesses, (Note: An exact number of 1,620 comes from a contemporary article published in The Atlanta Constitution. Several sources give a more general number of witnesses as around 1,600, while other sources state that roughly 1,800 people testified in the hearings. In the official majority report issued by the committee to the General Assembly, the group states that they had interviewed 1,800 total witnesses, of which roughly 1,600 were white and 200 were black. In the following sentence, which cites the same Atlanta Constitution article, it is assumed that the newspaper is referring only to white witnesses.) representing 148 of the state's 159 counties, which resulted in almost 2,500 pages of testimony. In total, the witnesses were estimated to represent roughly 115,000 people.

According to The Atlanta Constitution, 731 witnesses favored the local option, 831 favored massive resistance, and 58 gave no preference for either option. In five districts, the majority of witnesses favored the local option, while the majority of witnesses in the other five favored massive resistance. (Note: For a map showing the geographical locations of each congressional district and which option was favored in which, see Roche 1998 p. 139 and Dartt 2008 p. 114. For a county-level breakdown of how witnesses responded, see the map on Roche 1998 p. 149.) However, historian Jeff Roche notes that discrepancies exist between news accounts and the official results published by the committee, due in part to the fact that committee member Greer recorded many votes for massive resistance from individuals who never testified in hearings. Per Roche, the committee reported that a majority of witnesses in 7 of the state's congressional districts were in favor of massive resistance, with the vote split at 1,003 in favor of possible school closings and 575 in favor of the local option. Regardless of the discrepancy, Sibley, on numerous occasions, noted that the results were not binding on the committee's final report and were instead only to gather the opinion of the state's residents. According to committee member Hill, in response to repeated questions from reporters regarding whether he had learned anything new from the hearings, "The answer was always no".

== The reports ==
Following the conclusion of the hearings, the committee took a break of several days before meeting again to work on an official report to be submitted to the General Assembly. Duncan and Sibley urged the other committee members to remain silent to the press, and during this break, Sibley worked with Leverett to draft a proposed constitutional amendment that would allow the local option policy to become law. While an informal meeting was held on April 11, the committee's first official report meeting was held on April 12 and lasted 7 hours, during which time Sibley posed the local option as the only viable path to maintaining largescale segregation given the outcome of the Brown decision and recommended having the Georgia electorate vote on the amendment via secret ballot. During the meetings, the committee also considered testimony from Caldwell, Hall, and Hill, who had visited Virginia on March 28 to examine that state's handling of desegregation. Their trip had included a meeting with Virginia Governor J. Lindsay Almond and a trip to the Prince Edward Academy, a segregation academy, in Farmville, Virginia. An additional meeting was held on April 15.

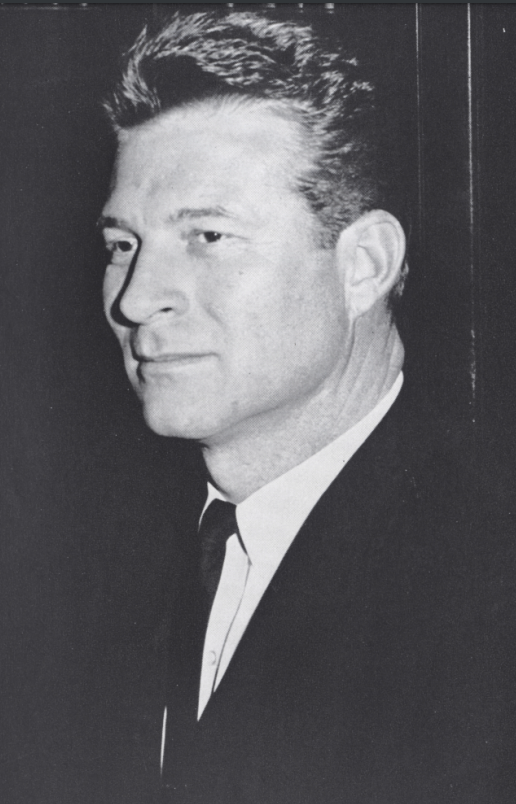
Segregationist state politician Peter Zack Geer (pictured 1962) cowrote the commission's minority report with Vice Chairman John Duncan.

In the end, the committee members were fairly divided between recommending a change in state law to allow for a local option and continuing support for massive resistance and possible school closures. A majority of the overall committee favored the local option, but a sizeable minority, which included many of the members of the General Assembly, supported possible school closures. A compromise was reached wherein a majority report, signed by Sibley and ten other members who supported the local option, would be written in conjunction with a minority report supported by other committee members. The minority report was written by vice chairman Duncan and segregationist politician Peter Zack Geer, an assistant of Governor Vandiver's. Along with Sibley, the majority report was signed by Arnold, Boykin, Caldwell, Cowan, Dent, Greer, Hollis, Kenimer, Purcell, and Rankin, while the minority report was signed by Brooks, Clary, Duncan, Hall, Hill, Jernigan, Keyton, and Parker. Additionally, Hill submitted another statement of his own writing to the General Assembly arguing that, due to the close polling between the two choices, the state government should consider other, unspecified options to address integration.

On April 28, at a meeting held in the chambers of the state's supreme court, Sibley presented the committee's majority report to the General Assembly. With the report, Sibley recommended accepting Hooper's ruling and outlined several paths for the state to maintain largescale segregation while accepting token integration in situations such as the one currently unfolding in Atlanta. Ultimately, the report recommended two constitutional amendments: one which would allow for white students to receive vouchers for private schools if their school became integrated and another to implement the local option plan to allow school districts to vote on whether they would integrate or remain segregated. In addition, several smaller pieces of legislation designed to accommodate the local option plan, such as ensuring retirement benefits for teachers at public integrated schools, were also recommended. Official copies of the majority report were sent to Governor Vandiver and both of Georgia's Senators, Richard Russell Jr. and Herman Talmadge. Compared to the majority report, the minority report received very little attention.

== Aftermath ==
=== Judge Hooper's ruling ===
On May 9, Judge Hooper denied a request by the plaintiffs in Calhoun v. Latimer for immediate desegregation of Atlanta's schools and instead requested that the General Assembly follow the path outlined in the Sibley Commission's majority report and repeal their massive resistance laws, setting a deadline for Atlanta school desegregation for May 1, 1969, before the fall semester began. Due to the delay in implementation, both 11th and 12th grades would be integrated under the same plan that the Atlanta school board had previously outlined, with the board having between May 1 and May 15, 1961, to process black applicants wishing to transfer to whites-only schools. Hooper stated that, regardless of any actions taken by the General Assembly, the integration would go into effect as planned.

=== Public opinion ===
The contents of the committee's majority report, as well as the decision to publish both a majority and minority report, proved decisive to many in the state. The major newspapers in the state were divided over their support for the local option plan outlined by the majority report, while many civic leaders in Atlanta were optimistic that the report would lead to the state government passing laws that would allow them to legally implement desegregation plans in the city. However, many state politicians, including Governor Vandiver, refused to comment on either report. According to political reporter Charles Pou of The Atlanta Journal, the competing reports frustrated many state politicians because, counter to the intended goals of the commission, it still meant that they would ultimately have to pick a side. In this vein, Governor Vandiver opted against calling a special session of the General Assembly and avoided directly commenting on the committee's report. Vandiver, who had been a big supporter of then-presidential candidate John F. Kennedy, hoped that if Kennedy won in the 1960 election that November, he would be named his Secretary of the Army and could avoid getting more involved in the state's desegregation issues altogether.

Without a special session, the General Assembly was set to act on the Sibley Commission's recommendations during their next meeting in January 1961. In the interim, Sibley and several other members of the commission began to garner support for the majority report's recommendations. In late May, Sibley and Governor Vandiver, the latter of whom still refusing to take a definitive stance on the committee's recommendations, appeared on a national broadcast called Who Speaks for the South?, which was hosted by Edward R. Murrow, to discuss the majority report. Sibley also worked with Atlanta Chamber of Commerce President Allen to garner support from members of the General Assembly for legislation following his recommendations, and by January 1961, 28 assemblymembers, including all those from the counties of Fulton and DeKalb, had signed their support for new legislation. However, many General Assembly members were doubtful that the legislature would pass this legislation, with Senate President Pro Tempore Carl Sanders saying in November 1960 that no new legislation would be considered until the courts had struck down the existing laws.

=== Desegregation of the University of Georgia ===
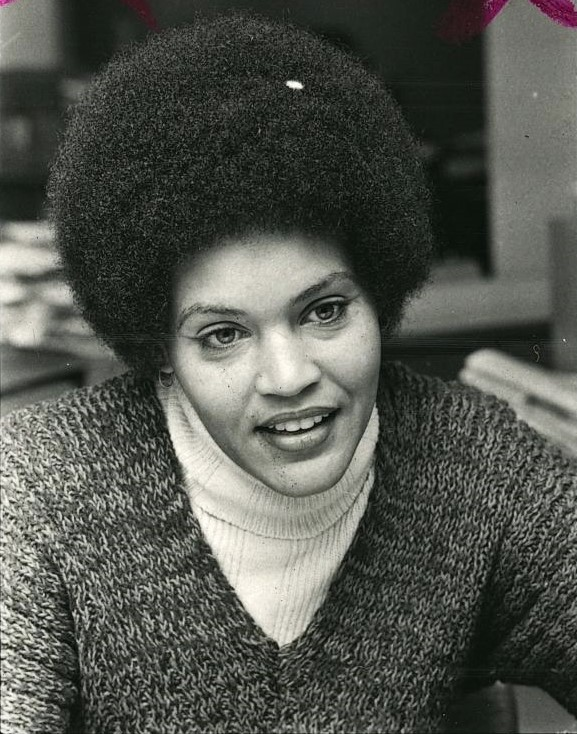
In 1961, Charlayne Hunter (pictured 1975) became one of the first African Americans to enroll at the University of Georgia.

On January 6, 1961, 3 days before the beginning of the General Assembly's session, Federal Judge William Augustus Bootle of Macon ordered the University of Georgia to integrate by admitting African American applicants Hamilton E. Holmes and Charlayne Hunter. On January 10, following efforts by the Vandiver administration to block Bootle's ruling, the governor ordered the university closed, but the next day, Bootle filed an injunction against Vandiver that temporarily stopped him from blocking funds for public educational institutions until a hearing on the matter could be held and further ordered the university to remain open. On the night of January 11, riots, led in part by U.S. Klans member Eldon Edwards, broke out on the university's campus against the two students' admittance. Although Vandiver ordered officers from the Georgia State Patrol to restore order, the rioting had mostly subsided by the time they arrived. On January 12, Judge Bootle ruled the state's mandatory school defunding laws unconstitutional and again ordered Holmes and Hunter, who Vandiver had suspended from the university following the riot, to be reinstated.

According to Vandiver, the university desegregation crisis revealed to him that massive resistance was no longer a viable political strategy, and the following week, after meeting with several dozen politicians at the Georgia Governor's Mansion to discuss the situation, he called for a joint session of the General Assembly on January 18. In the first-ever night session of the General Assembly, Vandiver recommended the legislature to adopt the recommendations of the Sibley Commission's majority report, as well as certain provisions from their minority report, that would have seen the repeal of all of the state's massive resistance legislation. The legislature acted over the next several days and, on January 31, Vandiver signed into law several pieces of legislation that enacted the recommendations of the commission. The following year, with the massive resistance legislation repealed, Atlanta's public schools integrated as planned, with 9 African American students admitted into formerly all-white schools in the first instance of a city in the Deep South peacefully integrating its school system.

== Legacy ==
Writing in the New Georgia Encyclopedia, historian Christopher Allen Huff of the University of Georgia characterized the legacy of the Sibley Commission thusly: "Although the Sibley Commission helped to prevent the violence that accompanied desegregation in other Deep South states, it also provided tactics that local school boards could use to slow down the desegregation process. As a result, serious attempts at desegregation across the state would not begin until the late 1960s". Several historians have noted the importance of the commission's hearings in helping to sway public opinion in the state away from massive resistance and towards some degree of acceptance of integration, and the commission's majority report was the first time that a state-sponsored organization characterized desegregation as an inevitability. Historian Alton Hornsby Jr. called the commission "one of the first major cracks in the wall of massive resistance in Georgia", while Roche claims that the commission made the abandonment of massive resistance legislation a palatable option for many Georgians. Atlanta's school desegregation drew praise from many national publications and political leaders, with President Kennedy sending a personal congratulations to Atlanta civic leaders and highlighting the city as an example for further peaceful desegregation. In 1965, facing further legal action by the NAACP, the Atlanta public school system voted to abandon their incremental desegregation plan and enacted immediate integration at all grade levels.

=== 1977 confirmation hearing of Griffin Bell ===
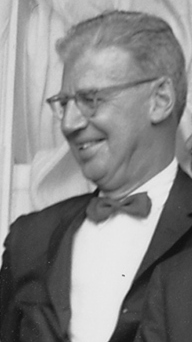
Several civil rights activists, including Joseph L. Rauh Jr. (pictured 1963), criticized Bell for his role in creating the Sibley Commission.

In 1977, the United States Senate Committee on the Judiciary held confirmation hearings regarding Bell's nomination to become the United States Attorney General, during which time several witnesses criticized the Sibley Commission. Civil liberties and civil rights lawyer Joseph L. Rauh Jr. alleged that the commission's report "recommended illegal acts to save segregation in Georgia", while Bond, who had testified at a Sibley Commission hearing while a college student, called the commission a "delaying tactic" that went against the "law of the land". NAACP lobbyist and civil rights lawyer Clarence Mitchell Jr. summarized the Sibley Commission as "a more sophisticated approach to maintaining segregation" and charged Bell with involvement in a "program to deny rights to black children". However, during the same hearing, several of Bell's colleagues in Georgia politics defended the commission, with Bell himself saying that, for the time and place in which it occurred, the idea for the Sibley Commission was progressive. Senator Sam Nunn of Georgia credited the commission with "being the vehicle that saved the Georgia public school system". In large part due to his work on forming the Sibley Commission, Bell was granted an honorary degree from Morris Brown College, a historically black college that also named him Man of the Year in 1976.

== See also ==
- Southern Manifesto – 1956 manifesto from Southern politicians promoting massive resistance
- Stanley Plan – 1956 massive resistance legislation in Virginia

== Sources ==
- Allen, Frederick (1996). Atlanta Rising: The Invention of an International City, 1946–1996. Marietta, Georgia: Longstreet Press. ISBN 978-1-56352-296-3.
- Bartley, Numan V. (1969). The Rise of Massive Resistance: Race and Politics in the South During the 1950's. Baton Rouge, Louisiana: Louisiana State University Press. ISBN 0-8071-0848-0. LCCN 76-80041.
- Dartt, Rebecca H. (2008). Women Activists in the Fight for Georgia School Desegregation, 1958–1961. Jefferson, North Carolina: McFarland & Company. ISBN 978-0-7864-3843-3.
- Hatfield, Edward A. (August 12, 2020) [October 12, 2007]. "Ministers' Manifesto". New Georgia Encyclopedia. Archived from the original on May 2, 2023.
- Henderson, Harold Paulk (April 5, 2021) [August 12, 2002]. "Ernest Vandiver Jr". New Georgia Encyclopedia. Archived from the original on February 21, 2024.
- Hornsby, Alton Jr. (1982). "A City That Was Too Busy to Hate: Atlanta Businessmen and Desegregation". In Elizabeth, Jacoway; Colburn, David R. (eds.). Southern Businessmen and Desegregation. Baton Rouge, Louisiana: Louisiana State University Press. pp. 120–136. ISBN 978-0-8071-0893-2.
- Hornsby, Alton Jr. (2009). Black Power in Dixie: A Political History of African Americans in Atlanta. Gainesville, Florida: University Press of Florida. ISBN 978-0-8130-3282-5.
- Huff, Christopher Allen (July 21, 2020) [June 22, 2006]. "Sibley Commission". New Georgia Encyclopedia. Archived from the original on February 26, 2024.
- Lanier, E. R. (October 19, 2016) [October 20, 2003]. "Griffin Bell". New Georgia Encyclopedia. Archived from the original on May 2, 2024.
- Michael, Deanna L. (2008). Jimmy Carter as Educational Policymaker: Equal Opportunity and Efficiency. Albany, New York: State University of New York Press. ISBN 978-0-7914-7529-4.
- Murphy, Reg (1999). Uncommon Sense: The Achievement of Griffin Bell. Marietta, Georgia: Longstreet Press. ISBN 978-1-56352-582-7.
- O'Brien, Thomas V. (1999). The Politics of Race and Schooling: Public Education in Georgia, 1900–1961. Lanham, Maryland: Lexington Books. ISBN 978-0-7391-0060-8.
- Pratt, Robert A. (2005) [2002]. We Shall Not Be Moved: The Desegregation of the University of Georgia (Paperback ed.). Athens, Georgia: University of Georgia Press. ISBN 978-0-8203-2399-2.
- Roche, Jeff (1998). Restructured Resistance: The Sibley Commission and the Politics of Desegregation in Georgia. Athens, Georgia: University of Georgia Press. ISBN 0-8203-1979-1.
- Silver, Christopher; Moeser, John V. (1995). The Separate City: Black Communities in the Urban South, 1940–1968. Lexington, Kentucky: University Press of Kentucky. ISBN 978-0-8131-1911-3.
- Sokol, Jason (2006). There Goes My Everything: White Southerners in the Age of Civil Rights, 1945–1975. New York City: Alfred A. Knopf. ISBN 0-307-26356-8.
- Trillin, Calvin (2017) [2016]. Jackson, 1964: And Other Dispatches from Fifty Years of Reporting on Race in America (Random House Trade Paperback ed.). New York City: Random House. ISBN 978-0-399-58824-2.
- Tuck, Stephen G. N. (2001). Beyond Atlanta: The Struggle for Racial Equality in Georgia, 1940–1980. Athens, Georgia: University of Georgia Press. ISBN 978-0-8203-2265-0.
- Griffin B. Bell: Hearings Before the Committee on the Judiciary, United States Senate, Ninety-Fifth Congress, First Session, on the Prospective Nomination of Griffin B. Bell, of Georgia, to be Attorney General. United States Senate Committee on the Judiciary. Washington, D.C.: United States Government Printing Office. 1977.
