= Cook County Courthouse =

Cook County Courthouse may refer to:

- Cook County Courthouse (Georgia), in Adel, Georgia
- Cook County Courthouse (Minnesota), in Grand Marais, Minnesota
- Richard J. Daley Center, the location of the Court of Cook County, Illinois
