= Donalsonville Historic District =

Historic district in Georgia, United States

- U.S. National Register of Historic Places
- U.S. Historic district
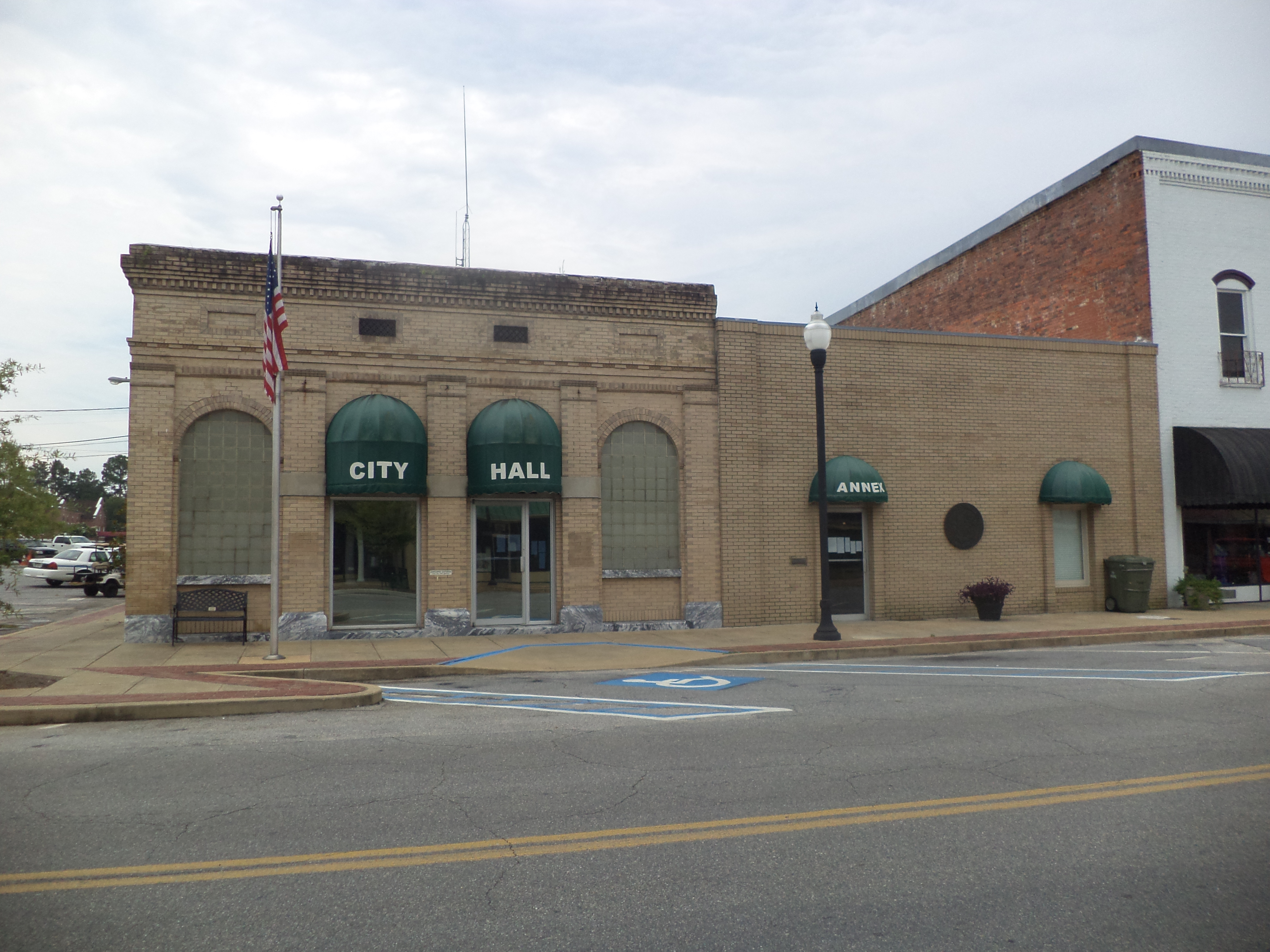
- Donalsonville City Hall on W. 2nd St.

- Location within Georgia Location within the United States
- Location: Roughly bounded by the Seaboard RR line, W. Third St., and Morris and S. Tennille Aves., Donalsonville, Georgia
- Coordinates: 31.0425°N 84.8825°W
- Area: 55 acres (22 ha)
- Built: 1889
- Architect: William J.J. Chase and others
- Architectural style: Beaux Arts, Early Commercial
- NRHP reference No.: 02000190
- Added to NRHP: March 20, 2002

The Donalsonville Historic District in Donalsonville, Georgia is a 55-acre (22 ha) historic district that was listed on the National Register of Historic Places in 2002.

It includes 48 contributing buildings and seven other contributing structures.

It includes the Seminole County Courthouse, which is separately listed on the National Register.
