= Seminole County Courthouse (Georgia) =

- U.S. National Register of Historic Places
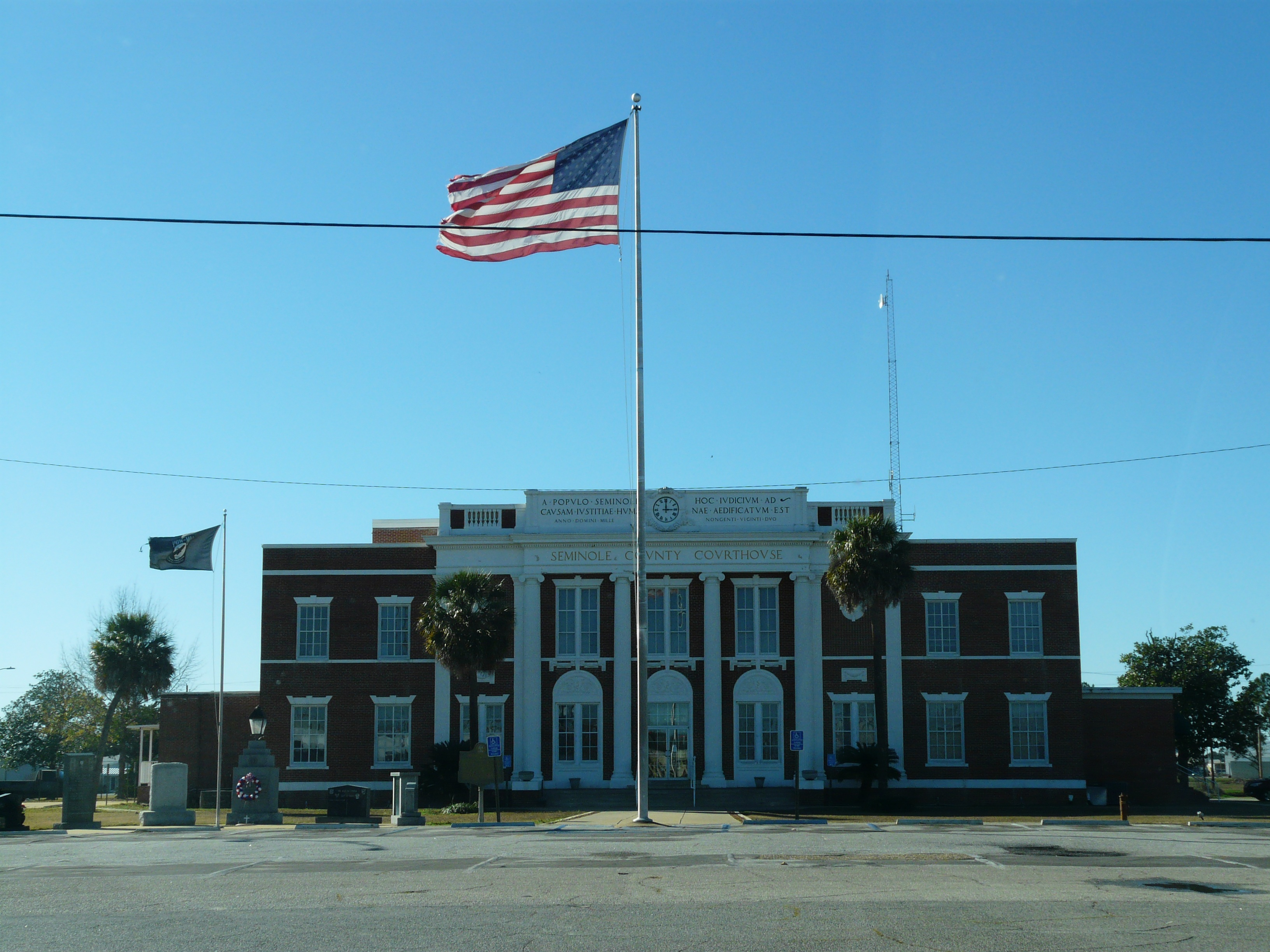

- Location within Georgia Location within the United States
- Location: Courthouse Sq., Donalsonville, Georgia
- Coordinates: 31°2′30″N 84°53′5″W
- Area: 2 acres (0.81 ha)
- Built: 1922
- Built by: Opelika Construction Co.
- Architect: William J.J. Chase
- Architectural style: Beaux Arts
- MPS: Georgia County Courthouses TR
- NRHP reference No.: 80001231
- Added to NRHP: September 18, 1980

The Seminole County Courthouse in Donalsonville, Georgia is a two-story Beaux Arts-style courthouse that was built in 1922. It was renovated in 1977–78. It has an Ionic tetrastyle projecting entrance with two-story columns. It was listed on the National Register of Historic Places in 1980.

It was designed by architect William J.J. Chase. A 1980 architectural survey form about the courthouse asserted that it "is the most outstanding building in Donalsonville, a town of 3,500 people. Architecturally it is one of the more outstanding 1920s courthouse structures in the state, because of the plan and the interior and exterior detailing."

It is also a contributing building in the NRHP-listed Donalsonville Historic District.
