= Carroll County Courthouse (Georgia) =

- U.S. National Register of Historic Places
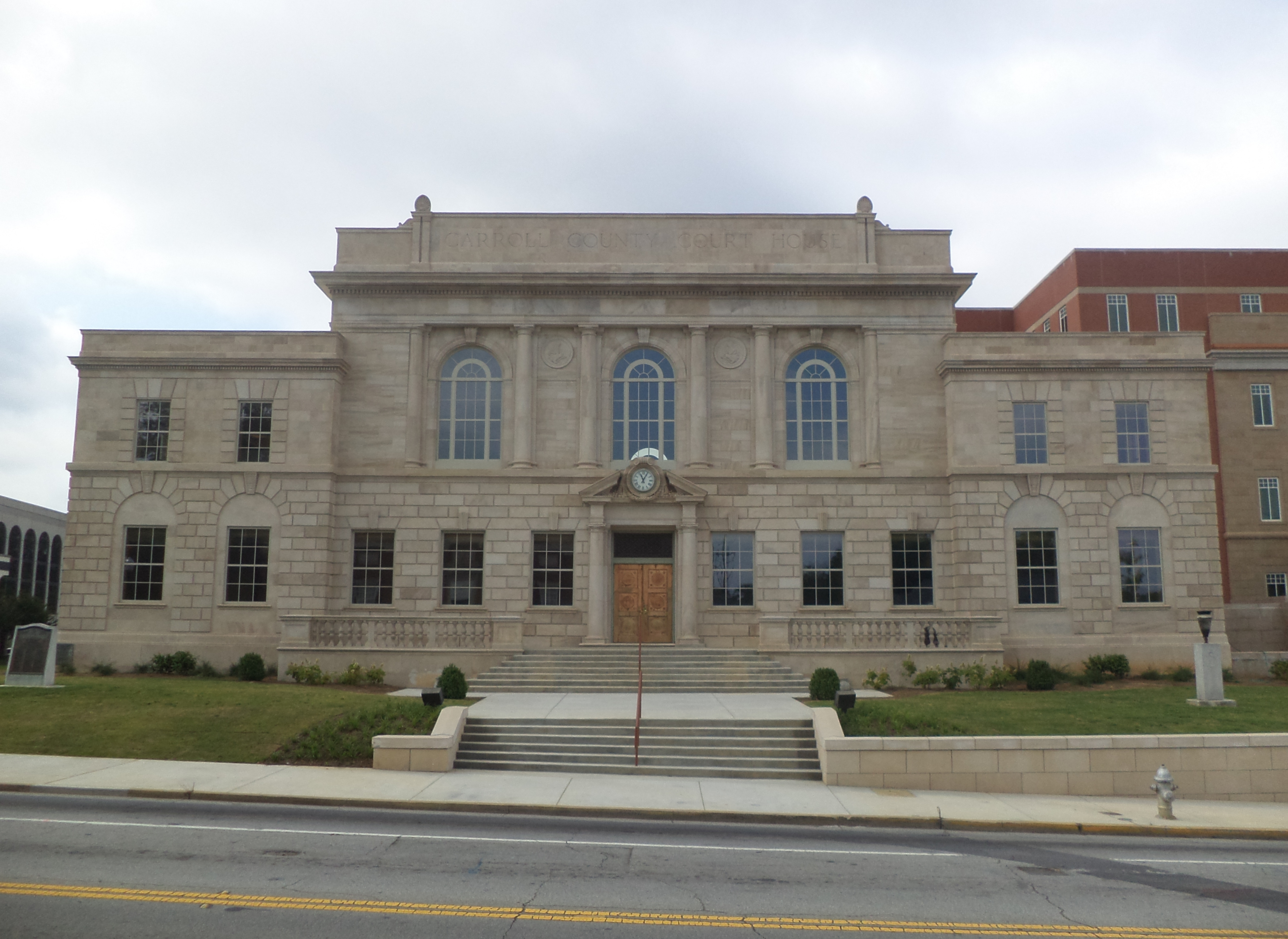

- Location within Georgia
- Location: Newnan and Dixie Sts., Carrollton, Georgia
- Coordinates: 33°34′46″N 85°04′22″W
- Area: 2 acres (0.81 ha)
- Built: 1928
- Built by: Carr Construction Co.
- Architect: William J.J. Chase
- Architectural style: Late 19th And 20th Century Revivals, Beaux Arts, Renaissance Revival
- MPS: Georgia County Courthouses TR
- NRHP reference No.: 80000985
- Added to NRHP: September 18, 1980

The Carroll County Courthouse in Carrollton, Georgia was built in 1928. It was listed on the National Register of Historic Places in 1980.

It is located at Newnan and Dixie Streets in Carrollton.

It was designed by architect William J.J. Chase and was built by the Carr Construction Co.

It has an unusually large courtroom, 25 feet (7.6 m) tall and 3,720 square feet (346 m^{2}) in plan.
