= Camilla Commercial Historic District =

Historic district in Georgia, United States

- U.S. National Register of Historic Places
- U.S. Historic district
- Location within Georgia Location within the United States
- Location: Roughly bounded by Broad, S. Scott and N. Scott Sts., Camilla, Georgia
- Area: 7 acres (2.8 ha)
- Architectural style: Late Victorian, Art Deco, Victorian Eclectic
- NRHP reference No.: 85000862
- Added to NRHP: April 18, 1985

The Camilla Commercial Historic District in Camilla, Georgia is a 7-acre (2.8 ha) historic district that was listed on the National Register of Historic Places in 1985. It then included 23 contributing buildings. The majority of structures are one- to three-story brick commercial buildings, that are "modest examples of the Victorian Eclectic, Early 20th-century Commercial, and Art Deco styles and represent local builder/architects' interpretations of nationally popular styles." The commercial buildings are contrasted by the white marble Mitchell County Courthouse, which was designed by Atlanta architect William J.J. Chase (1884–1967) and built in the mid-1930s.
