= Hall County Jail =

- U.S. National Register of Historic Places
- Location within Georgia
- Location: Bradford St., Gainesville, Georgia
- Coordinates: 34°17′52″N 83°49′33″W
- Area: less than one acre
- Built: 1934-35
- Built by: A.K. Adams
- Architect: William J.J. Chase
- Architectural style: Art Deco
- MPS: County Jails of the Georgia Mountains Area TR
- NRHP reference No.: 85002084
- Added to NRHP: September 13, 1985

The Hall County Jail, on Bradford St. in Gainesville, Georgia, also known as the Old Hall County Jail, is an Art Deco-style building built in 1934–1935. It was listed on the National Register of Historic Places in 1985.

It was designed by architect William J.J. Chase and was partially funded by the Federal Emergency Administration of the Public Works Administration.

It was used as a jail until 1981.
