= Cook County Courthouse (Georgia) =

- U.S. National Register of Historic Places
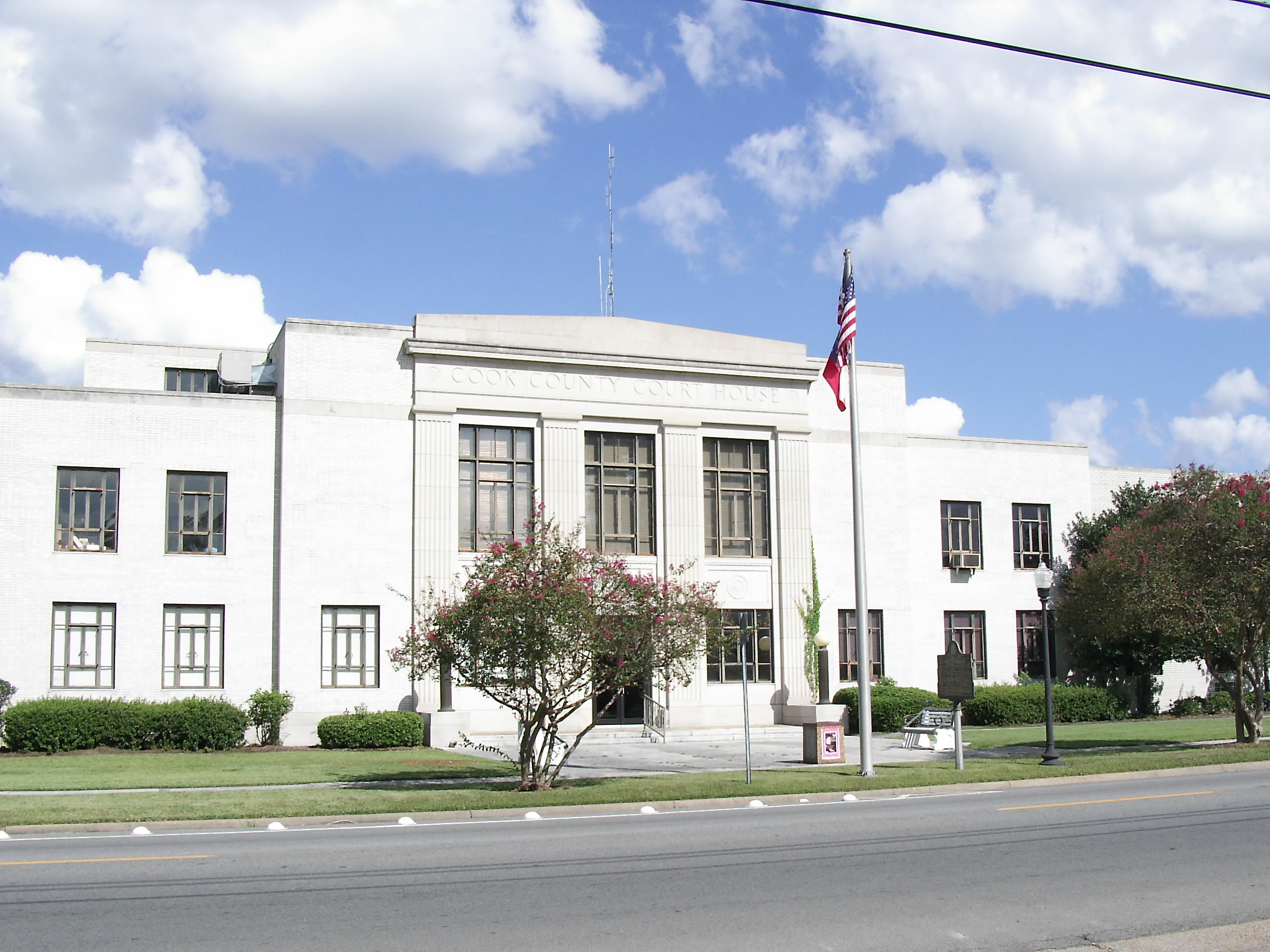

- Location within Georgia Location within the United States
- Location: 212 N. Hutchinson Ave., Adel, Georgia
- Coordinates: 31.1393°N 83.4238°W
- Area: 2 acres (0.81 ha)
- Built: 1939
- Architect: Chase, William J.J.; Lee, Ray M.
- Architectural style: Stripped Classical
- MPS: Georgia County Courthouses TR
- NRHP reference No.: 95000714
- Added to NRHP: June 14, 1995

The Cook County Courthouse in Adel, Georgia is a building built in 1939. It was designed by Atlanta architect William J. J. Chase and was built by the Ray M. Lee Company. The Public Works Administration provided 45% of the funds. It is a two-story brick building with limestone in the Stripped Classical style. The steps a made of granite from Stone Mountain. The original layout was a cross plan, with halls going to exterior doors on all four sides. It has a flat roof and concrete foundation. The county jail was originally south side. The building was extended in 1973. It was listed on the National Register of Historic Places in 1995.
