= William J.J. Chase =

American architect

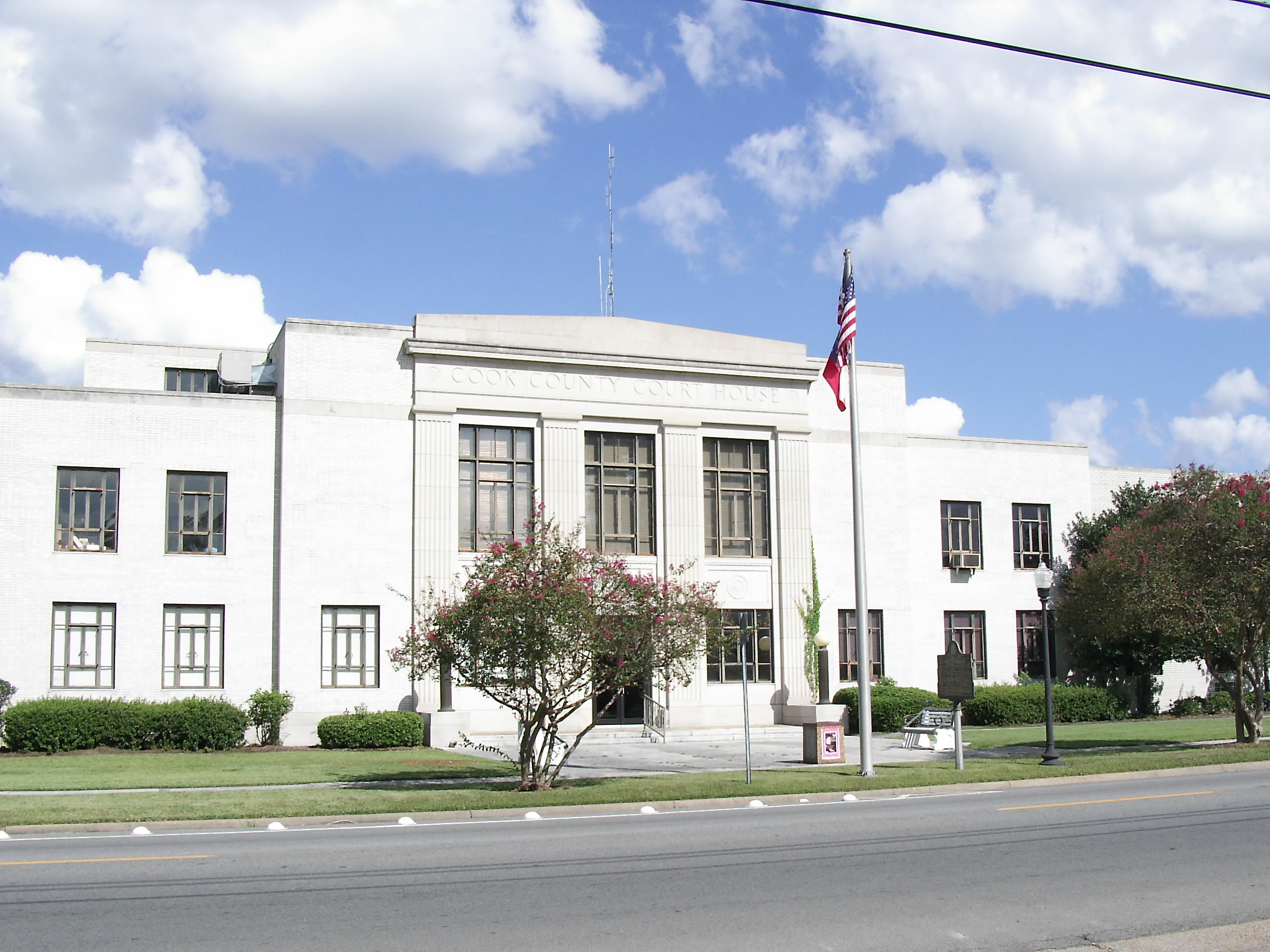
Cook County Courthouse, Adel, Georgia

William J.J. Chase was an American architect of Atlanta, Georgia.

He designed many schools, hospitals, and jails and at least seven courthouses around the state. A number of his works are listed on the National Register of Historic Places (NRHP).

Works include:

- Seminole County Courthouse (1922), Courthouse Sq., Donalsonville, GA, NRHP-listed Beaux Arts-style courthouse built in 1922, with an Ionic tetrastyle projecting entrance.
- Moultrie High School (1928–29), 7th Ave., Moultrie, GA, NRHP-listed
- Mitchell County Courthouse (mid-1930s), in the NRHP-listed Camilla Commercial Historic District, Camilla, GA, NRHP-listed
- Dixie Hunt Hotel (1937), 209 Spring St., SW, Gainesville, GA, NRHP-listed
- Troup County Courthouse, Annex, and Jail (1939), LaGrange, Georgia. Public Works Administration-funded, Stripped Classical style.
- Cook County Courthouse (1939), 212 N. Hutchinson Ave., Adel, GA, NRHP-listed
- Carroll County Courthouse, Newnan and Dixie Sts. Carrollton, GA, NRHP-listed
- Hall County Jail, Bradford St., Gainesville, GA, NRHP-listed
- One or more works in Reynoldstown Historic District, roughly bounded by the CSX rail line, Memorial Dr., Pearl St., and Moreland, Atlanta, GA, NRHP-listed
- One or more works in Downtown Douglas Historic District, roughly bounded by Jackson St., Pearl Ave., Cherry St. and the Georgia-Florida RR tracks, Douglas, GA, NRHP-listed
- One or more works in Fort Valley State College Historic District, Pear St. and State University Dr., Fort Valley, GA, NRHP-listed
