= Troup County Courthouse =

- Troup County Courthouse, Annex, and Jail
- U.S. National Register of Historic Places
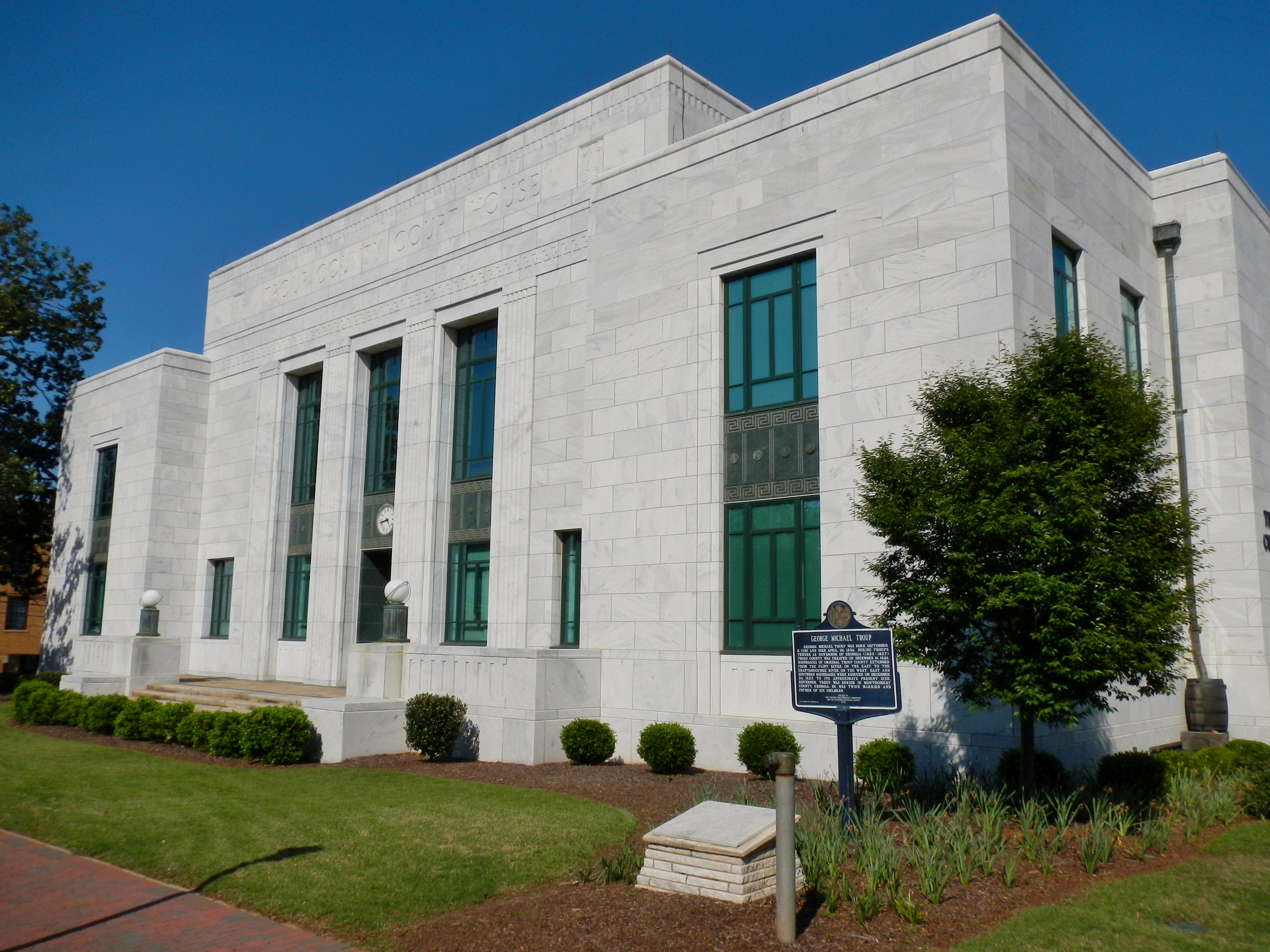

- Location within Georgia Location within the United States
- Location: 118 Ridley Avenue, LaGrange, Georgia
- Coordinates: 33°2′25″N 85°1′50″W
- Area: 1.5 acres (0.61 ha)
- Built: 1939
- Built by: A.J. Honeycutt Co.
- Architect: William J.J. Chase
- Architectural style: Stripped Classicism
- MPS: Georgia County Courthouses TR
- NRHP reference No.: 95000721
- Added to NRHP: June 8, 1995

The Troup County Courthouse, Annex, and Jail are three buildings built in 1939 with funding from the Public Works Administration, as a project under the New Deal of U.S. President Franklin D. Roosevelt's administration to invest in infrastructure. They were designed by architect William J.J. Chase in Stripped Classical style.

LaGrange was in the news in January 2017 for the public apology of its police chief and mayor for the city's failure to prevent the 1940 lynching of Austin Callaway, a young black man. Callaway was taken by a gang of white men from the jail, which presumably was this Troup County Jail.

The old Troup County Courthouse is used in the 21st century as the Juvenile Courthouse. The jail behind it was torn down in 2001 when the Troup County Government Center was built.
