= Colquitt County Arts Center =

- Moultrie High School
- U.S. National Register of Historic Places
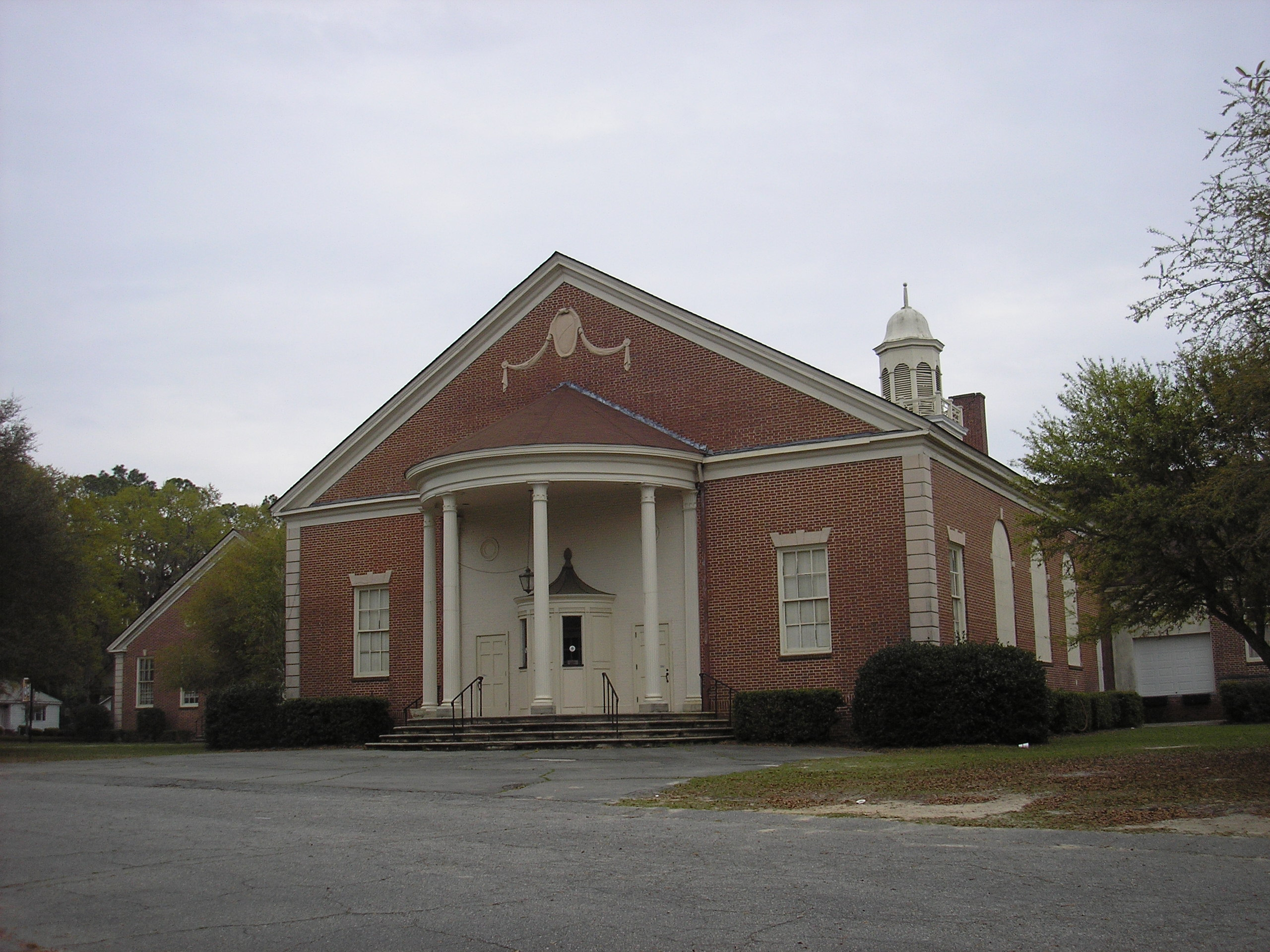

- Location within Georgia Location within the United States
- Location: 401 7th Ave. SW, Moultrie, Georgia
- Coordinates: 31.172222°N 83.794444°W
- Area: 6 acres (2.4 ha)
- Built: 1928-1929
- Built by: W.J. Pippin
- Architect: William J.J. Chase
- Architectural style: Georgian Revival
- NRHP reference No.: 82002398
- Added to NRHP: June 17, 1982

The Moultrie High School in Moultrie, Georgia, United States was built in 1928-1929 and was listed on the National Register of Historic Places in 1982. It later became the Colquitt County Arts Center, which offers art classes and other services.

It is a one-story U-shaped brick building covering most of an entire block which was built in Georgian Revival style. It was designed by architect William J.J. Chase and was built by Moultrie contractor W.J. Pippin. The brick is laid in Flemish bond.

The Arts Center began as a project of the Moultrie Service League in 1977.

McCall art collection. He personally selected and donated to the Colquitt County Arts Center each piece of art in the collection, which is housed in the

A permanent McCall Gallery at the Colquitt County Arts Center houses the William Frank McCall Jr. Permanent Collection.

== See also ==
- Colquitt County High School, the current high school serving the area
