= List of Art Deco architecture in Georgia (U.S. state) =

This is a list of buildings that are examples of the Art Deco architectural style in Georgia, United States.

Atlanta City Hall, Atlanta

== Atlanta ==
- 7 Stages Theatre (former Little 5 Points Theatre), Atlanta, 1940
- Atlanta City Hall, Atlanta, 1930
- Cheshire Square Shopping Center, Atlanta, 1967
- Empire Manufacturing Company Building, Atlanta, 1939
- Evans Cucich House, Atlanta, 1935
- Forsyth Walton Building, Atlanta, 1936
- Freeman Ford Building, Atlanta, 1930
- GLG Grand, Atlanta, 1992
- Healey Building, Atlanta, 1920
- Lerner Shops, Atlanta
- Majestic Diner, Atlanta, 1929
- Martin Luther King, Jr. Federal Building, Atlanta, 1933
- Municipal Auditorium, Atlanta, 1909
- Nabisco Plant, Atlanta, 1955
- National NuGrape Company, Atlanta, 1937
- Olympia Building, Atlanta, 1936
- Plaza Theater, Atlanta, 1939
- Regenstein's, Atlanta
- Rhodes Haverty Building, Atlanta
- Southern Bell Telephone Company Building, Atlanta, 1929
- Southern Dairies, Atlanta, 1939
- Telephone Factory Lofts, Atlanta, 1938
- Ten Park Place, Atlanta, 1930
- Troy-Peerless Laundry Building, Atlanta, 1929
- United States Post Office, Federal Annex, Atlanta, 1933
- Variety Playhouse, Atlanta, 1940
- W. W. Orr Building, Atlanta, 1930
- William–Oliver Building, Atlanta, 1930

== Gainesville ==
- Dixie Hunt Hotel, Gainesville, 1937
- Logan Building, Gainesville, 1929
- Old Hall County Courthouse, Gainesville, 1937

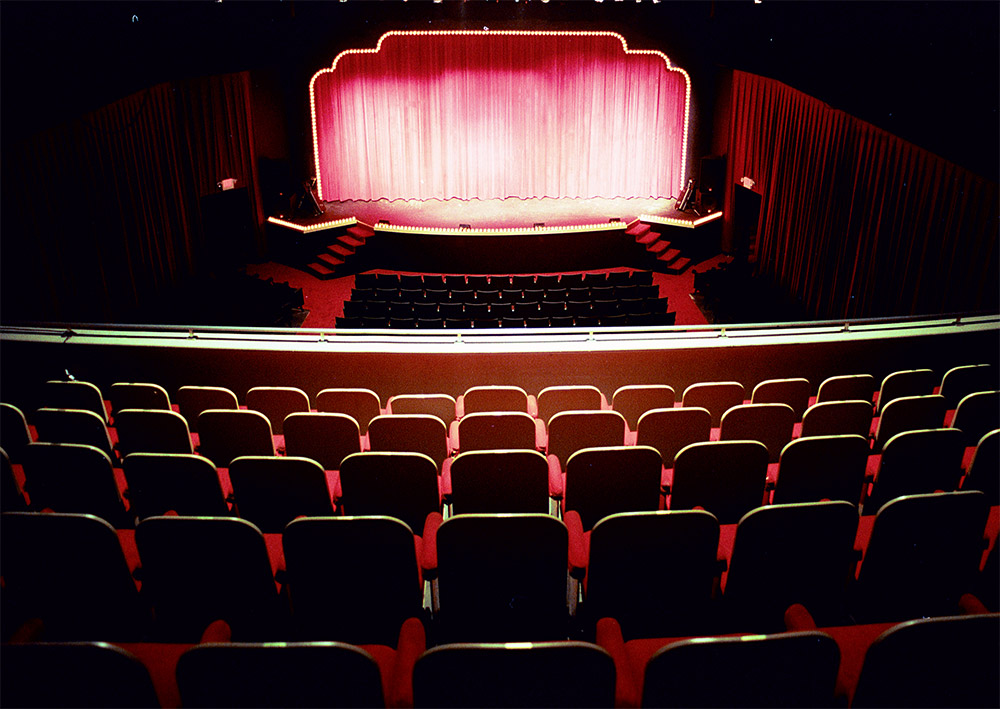
The Savannah Theatre, Savannah

== Savannah ==
- Globe Shoe Company, Savannah, 1929
- Karpf Building, Savannah
- The Savannah Theatre, Savannah, 1958

== Tifton ==
- Jenny's Fashion, Tifton Commercial Historic District, Tifton
- Lockeby Building, Tifton Commercial Historic District, Tifton, 1937
- Tift Theater, Tifton, 1937

Southern Georgian Building, Kingsland

== Other cities ==
- Albany Insurance Mart, Albany, 1950s
- The Muse Theatre, Perry, 1950s
- Bacon Theatre, Alma, 1946
- Blackshear Bank Building, Blackshear, 1930s
- Blair Rutland Building, Decatur, 1925
- Campus Theatre, Milledgeville
- Coffee County Courthouse, Downtown Douglas Historic District, Douglas, 1940
- Colquitt Theater, Colquitt Town Square Historic District, Colquitt
- Colquitt Theater, Moultrie Commercial Historic District, Moultrie, 1941
- Dosta Theater (aka Dosta Playhouse), Valdosta, 1941
- Dublin Theatre, Dublin, 1934
- Earl Smith Strand Theater, Marietta, 1935
- Early County Jail, Blakely Court Square Historic District, Blakely, 1940
- Fickling Lodge No. 129, Butler, 1920
- Friedlander's Building, Moultrie, 1936
- Georgia Theater (now Emma Kelly Theater in the Averitt Center for the Arts), Statesboro, 1936
- Grand Theater, Fitzgerald, 1936
- Hogansville City Hall (former Royal Theater), Hogansville, 1937
- Holly Theatre, Dahlonega, 1948
- Liberty Theater, Columbus, 1925
- Martin Theatre (now Martin Centre), Downtown Douglas Historic District, Douglas, 1939
- Miller Theatre, Augusta, 1938
- Mitchell County Courthouse, Camilla Commercial Historic District, Camilla, mid-1930s
- Monroe City Hall, Monroe, 1939
- Montezuma Motor Company, Montezuma, 1920s
- Montgomery Ward Building, Griffin Commercial Historic District, Griffin, 1929
- Ocmulgee National Monument Visitor Center, Macon, 1936
- Pickens County Courthouse, Jasper, 1949
- Pine Theatre, Fitzgerald, 1945
- Ritz Theater, Thomaston, 1927
- Ritz Theatre at the Schaefer Center, Toccoa, 1939
- Royal Cafe, Quitman Historic District, Quitman, 1913
- Southeast Georgian Building, Kingsland Commercial Historic District, Kingsland, 1925
- Southern Trust Building, Macon, 1941
- State Theatre, Albany, 1945
- Strand Dinner Cinema, Jesup, 1920s
- Suwanee City Hall (Town Center), Suwanee, 2002
- Sylvia Theatre & Granitoid Office Building, Sylvania
- Tom Huston Frozen Foods Company–Montezuma Motor Company, Montezuma, 1920
- Troup County Courthouse, Annex, and Jail, LaGrange, 1939
- United States Post Office, Decatur, 1935
- Walker Theatre, Fort Gaines, 1936
- West Theatre, Cedartown, 1941
- Wink Theater, Dalton Commercial Historic District, Dalton, 1938
- Zebulon Theater, Cairo, 1936

== See also ==
- List of Art Deco architecture
- List of Art Deco architecture in the United States
