= South Georgia College =

South Georgia College may refer to:

- South Georgia State College, a four-year college, one component of which was formerly known as South Georgia College in Douglas, Georgia
- South Georgia College (Methodist), a former Methodist school in McRae, Georgia (see Telfair Center for the Arts)
