= Gainesville Commercial Historic District =

- U.S. National Register of Historic Places
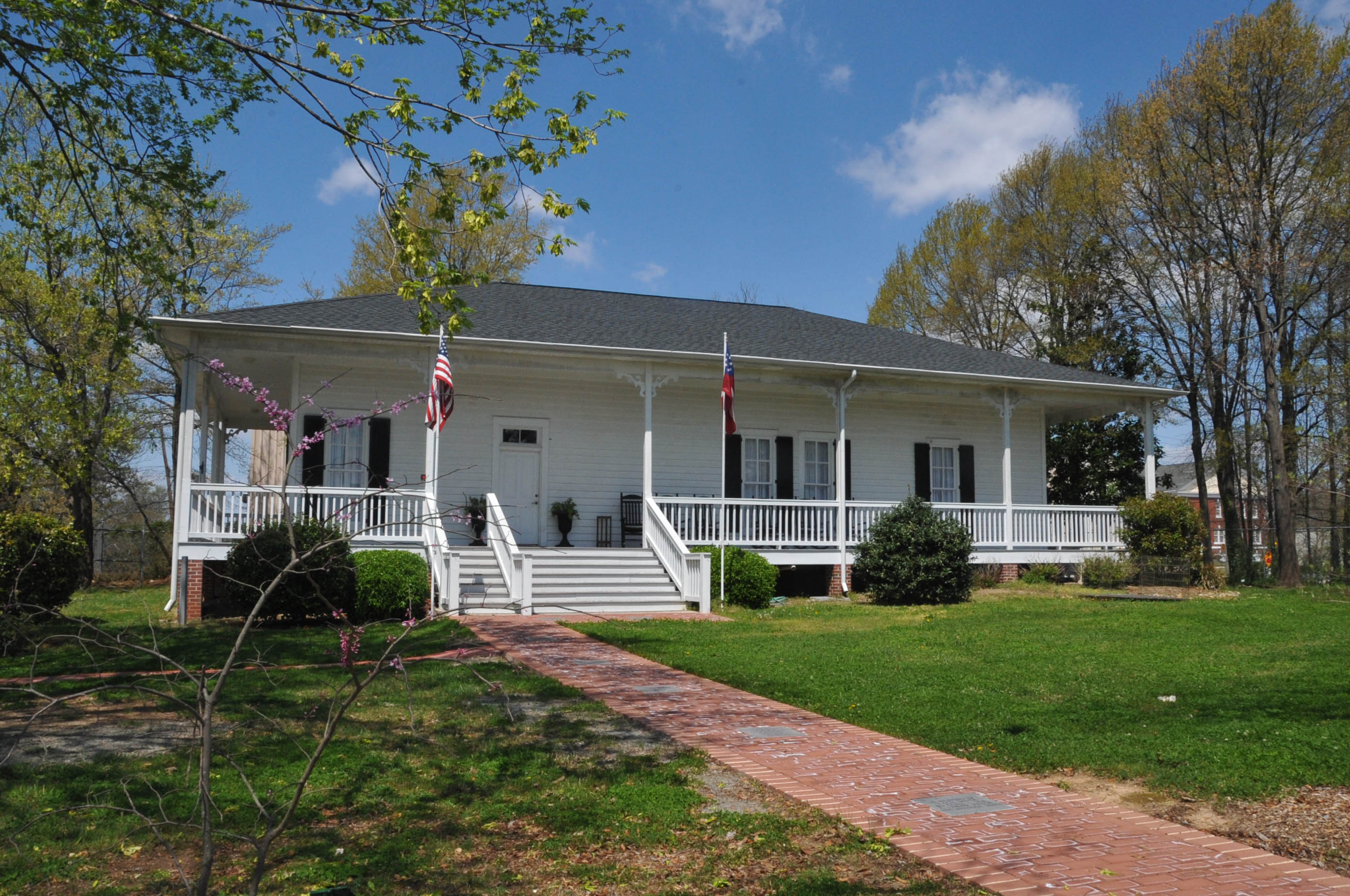

- Location within Georgia
- Location: Roughly bounded by Broad St., Maple St., Academy St. and Green St., Gainesville, Georgia
- Coordinates: 34°17′57″N 83°49′37″W
- Area: 18 acres (7.3 ha)
- Built: 1820
- Architectural style: Romanesque, Renaissance, et al.
- NRHP reference No.: 02000873
- Added to NRHP: March 14, 2003

The Gainesville Commercial Historic District in Gainesville, Georgia is an 18-acre (7.3 ha) historic district which is roughly bounded by Broad St., Maple St., Academy St. and Green St. It was listed on the National Register of Historic Places in 2003.

It included 50 contributing buildings, 18 non-contributing buildings, one contributing structure, one contributing site, and a contributing object.

It includes:

- Imperial Pharmacy (1871),
- Hosch Building (c.1901),
- Logan Building (1929), separately listed on the National Register
- Dixie Hunt Hotel (1938), separately listed on the National Register
- Federal Building and Courthouse, separately listed on the National Register
- Jackson Building, separately listed on the National Register.

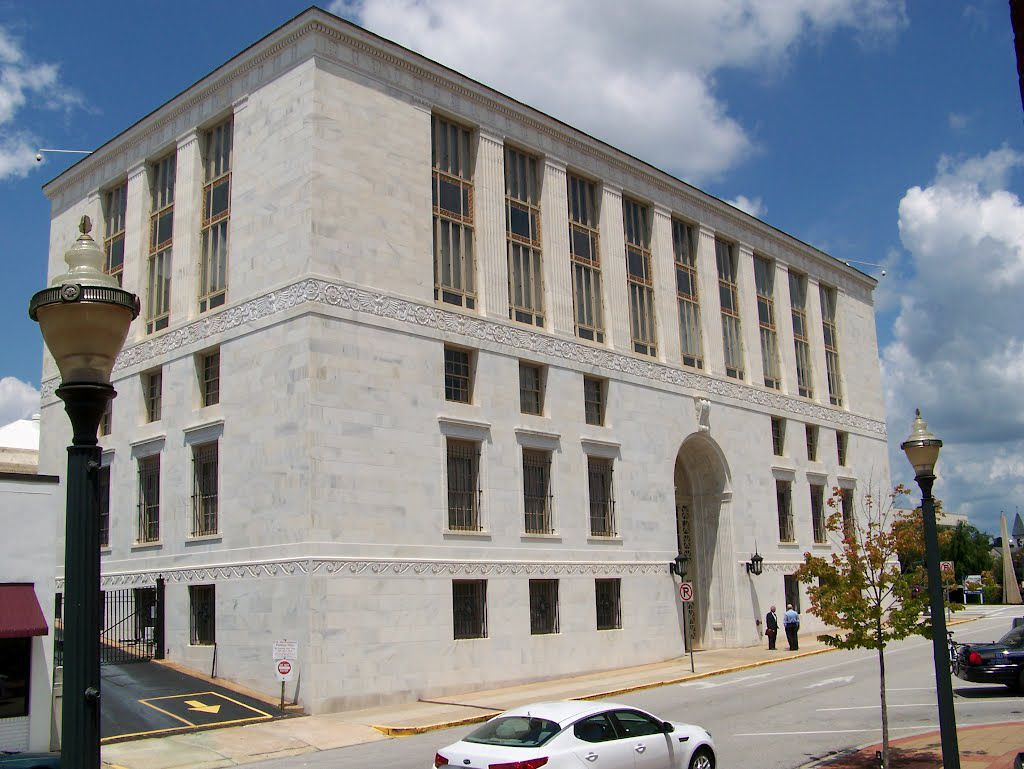
Federal Courthouse
