= Jackson Building =

Jackson Building may refer to:

- Jackson Building (Clarkesville, Georgia), listed on the NRHP in Habersham County, Georgia
- Jackson Building (Gainesville, Georgia), listed on the NRHP in Hall County, Georgia
- Jackson Building (Asheville, North Carolina)
- Jackson Tower, Portland, Oregon
- Miller-Jackson Building, Oklahoma City, Oklahoma, listed on the NRHP in Oklahoma County, Oklahoma
- Mary W. Jackson Building, Washington, D.C., NASA Headquarters

== See also ==
- Jackson School (disambiguation), including school buildings
- Jackson (disambiguation)
