= List of Art Deco architecture in Georgia =

List of Art Deco architecture in Georgia may refer to:

- List of Art Deco architecture in Georgia (country)
- List of Art Deco architecture in Georgia (U.S. state)
