= Pirkle =

Pirkle is a surname. Notable people with the surname include:

- Clay Pirkle (born 1967), American politician
- Estus Pirkle (1930–2005), American Baptist minister

== See also ==
- Bowman-Pirkle House, formerly owned by Civil War veteran Noah Pirkle
