= National Register of Historic Places listings in Hall County, Georgia =

Location of Hall County in Georgia

This is a list of properties and districts in Hall County, Georgia that are listed on the National Register of Historic Places (NRHP).

This National Park Service list is complete through NPS recent listings posted October 16, 2026.

== Current listings ==
	Name on the Register	Image	Date listed	Location	City or town	Description
1	Alta Vista Cemetery	Alta Vista Cemetery	August 28, 2012 (#12000551)	521 Jones Street; 34°17′24″N 83°50′15″W	Gainesville	
2	Bailey-Harper House-Doctors Building	Bailey-Harper House-Doctors Building	June 14, 2006 (#06000504)	204 Green St., NE; 34°18′05″N 83°49′35″W	Gainesville	
3	Bowman-Pirkle House	Bowman-Pirkle House	August 14, 1973 (#73000623)	NE of Buford off U.S. 23 on Friendship Rd. 34°08′33″N 83°57′16″W	Buford	
4	Brenau College District	Brenau College District	August 24, 1978 (#78000987)	Academy, Prior, Washington and Boulevard Sts. 34°18′12″N 83°49′19″W	Gainesville	Superseded by Green Street-Brenau Historic District.
5	Candler Street School	Candler Street School	September 30, 1982 (#82002447)	525 Candler St. 34°18′28″N 83°49′29″W	Gainesville	Contributing property to Green Street-Brenau Historic District.
6	Chicopee Mill and Village Historic District	Chicopee Mill and Village Historic District	July 25, 1985 (#85001638)	Roughly bounded by Fourth & Fifth Sts., North, K, 8th, H, G & F Aves. on US 23; 34°15′11″N 83°50′45″W	Gainesville	
7	Clermont Residential Historic District		September 5, 1985 (#85001970)	Main, Harris, Martin, and Railroad Sts. 34°28′46″N 83°46′24″W	Clermont	
8	Dixie Hunt Hotel	Dixie Hunt Hotel	May 16, 1985 (#85001057)	209 Spring St., SW; 34°17′54″N 83°49′38″W	Gainesville	
9	Federal Building and Courthouse	Federal Building and Courthouse	January 24, 1974 (#74000684)	126 Washington St. 34°17′59″N 83°49′34″W	Gainesville	
10	Flowery Branch Commercial Historic District		August 30, 1985 (#85001932)	Main St. & Railroad Ave. 34°11′05″N 83°55′31″W	Flowery Branch	
11	Friendship Baptist Church Cemetery	Friendship Baptist Church Cemetery	August 20, 2019 (#100004298)	3759 Friendship Rd. 34°07′33″N 83°55′12″W	Buford	
12	Gainesville Commercial Historic District	Gainesville Commercial Historic District	March 14, 2003 (#02000873)	Roughly bounded by Broad St., Maple St., Academy St. and Green St. 34°17′57″N 83°49′37″W	Gainesville	
13	Gillsville Historic District	Gillsville Historic District	August 30, 1985 (#85001933)	GA 52; 34°18′38″N 83°38′20″W	Gillsville	
14	Green Street District	Green Street District	August 15, 1975 (#75000596)	Both sides of Green St. from Green Street Pl. to Glenwood Rd. 34°18′27″N 83°49′37″W	Gainesville	Superseded by Green Street-Brenau Historic District.
15	Green Street-Brenau Historic District	Green Street-Brenau Historic District	September 5, 1985 (#85001974)	Green, Candler, Park, Brenau, Boulevard & Prior Sts., Green St. Circle, City Park and much of Brenau College Campus; 34°18′29″N 83°49′31″W	Gainesville	Includes Brenau College District, Green Street District and Candler Street School.
16	Hall County Courthouse	Hall County Courthouse	June 8, 1995 (#95000717)	Jct. of Spring and Green Sts. 34°17′56″N 83°49′32″W	Gainesville	
17	Hall County Jail		September 13, 1985 (#85002084)	Bradford St. 34°17′52″N 83°49′33″W	Gainesville	
18	Head's Mill	Head's Mill	January 12, 1990 (#89002301)	Whitehall Rd., E of jct. with US 23; 34°21′55″N 83°43′54″W	Lula	
19	Jackson Building	Jackson Building	August 1, 1985 (#85001677)	112 Washington St. NE; 34°17′58″N 83°49′35″W	Gainesville	
20	Logan Building	Logan Building	January 4, 1990 (#89002266)	119 E. Washington St. 34°18′00″N 83°49′34″W	Gainesville	
21	Lula Residential Historic District	Lula Residential Historic District	September 11, 1985 (#85002244)	Cobb, Carter, Chattahoochee and Toombs Sts. 34°23′17″N 83°40′11″W	Lula	
22	Beulah Rucker House-School	Beulah Rucker House-School	May 4, 1995 (#95000533)	2110 Athens Hwy. 34°16′54″N 83°47′16″W	Gainesville	
23	Tanner's Mill		September 10, 1979 (#79000729)	S of Gainesville on SR 3; 34°10′42″N 83°47′13″W	Gainesville	
