= Federal Building and United States Courthouse =

Federal Building and United States Courthouse may refer to:

- Federal Building and United States Courthouse (Albuquerque, New Mexico)
- Federal Building and United States Courthouse (Dothan, Alabama)
- Federal Building and U.S. Courthouse (Gainesville, Georgia)
- Federal Building and United States Courthouse (Sioux City, Iowa)
- Federal Building and United States Courthouse (Sioux Falls, South Dakota)
- Federal Building and United States Courthouse (Wheeling, West Virginia, 1907)
