= Walters-Davis House =

Historic house in Georgia, US

- U.S. National Register of Historic Places
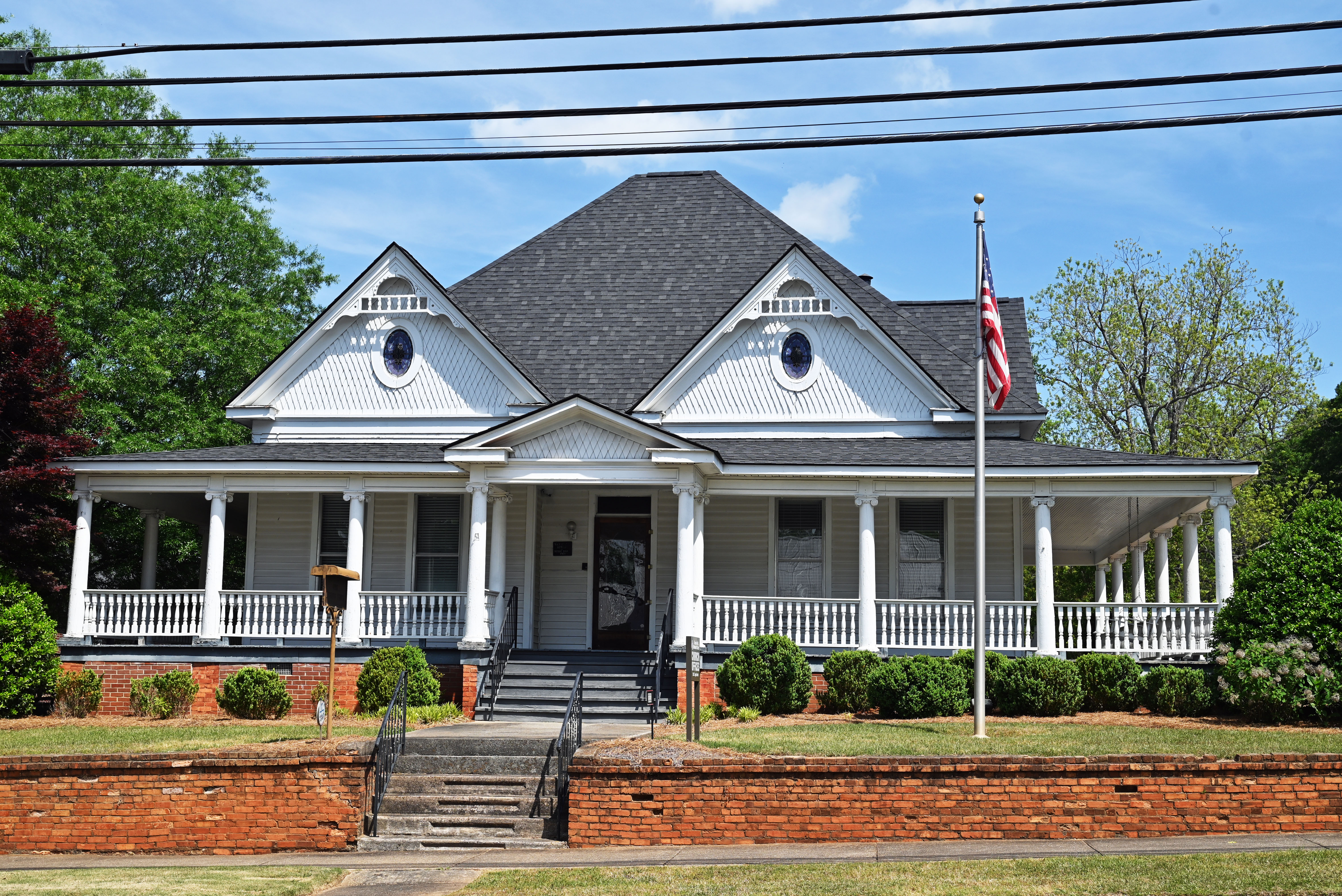

- Location within Georgia
- Location: 429 E. Tugalo St., Toccoa, Georgia
- Coordinates: 34.58051°N 83.32425°W
- Area: 0.5 acres (0.20 ha)
- Built: 1906
- Built by: E.L. Prater
- Architectural style: Late Victorian Eclectic
- NRHP reference No.: 82002464
- Added to NRHP: June 17, 1982

The Walters-Davis House, at 429 E. Tugalo St. in Toccoa in Stephens County, Georgia, was built in 1906. It was listed on the National Register of Historic Places in 1982.

It is a one-story late Victorian Eclectic-style house. It was deemed significant architecturally and for its association with Judge Ben Davis, who occupied the house in 1912, purchased it in 1915, and lived in it until his death.

Davis was President of the Stephens County Bar Association for 20 years and also served as Recorder for the City of Toccoa and as Judge of City Police and Justice Courts.

It was built by master builder E.L. Prater (1872–1950), who also built the NRHP-listed James B. Simmons House (1903) and the Stephens County Jail, both in Toccoa, as well as a bank in Taylorsville and the NRHP-listed Candler Street School (1911) in Gainesville, Georgia.

The listing included a second contributing building, originally an outhouse and coal storage building, now a storage building.

The property was acquired by the Toccoa First United Methodist Church, located at 333 E. Tugalo St., in 1984, and serves as offices for the church.
