= South Georgia College (Methodist) =

Methodist college in McRae, Georgia (1892–1928)

South Georgia College, also referred to as Old South Georgia College was a Methodist affiliated school in McRae, Georgia. It opened in 1892. The school closed in 1928. The campus was sold to the local school district. campus and was a high school until the 1960s when it became a primary school. Its administration building is listed on the National Register of Historic Places and is now part of Telfair Center for the Arts.

Reverend W. A. Huckabee was its first president.

Young Seaborn Anderson Roddenbery taught at the school. The cane syrup factory W. R. Roddenbery Building, part of the Cairo Commercial Historic District, is in Cairo, Georgia. The Roddenbery Memorial Library in Cairo is named for the family that donated its building.
