= Beulah Rucker Oliver =

African-American educator (1888–1963)

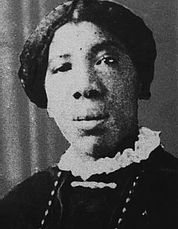
- Beulah Rucker Oliver, c. 1909.
- Born: Beulah Rucker; April 4, 1888; Harmony Grove, Banks County, Georgia, United States
- Died: February 27, 1963 (aged 74); Gainesville, Georgia
- Education: Savannah State College (1944)
- Occupation: Teacher
- Known for: Beulah Rucker Industrial School
- Notable work: The Rugged Pathway (1953)

Beulah Rucker Oliver (April 4, 1888 – February 27, 1963) was an African-American educator from Banks County, Georgia. In 1915 she opened the Rucker Industrial School in Gainesville to teach African-Americans; Rucker (Note: After her marriage to Byrd Oliver, Rucker continued using her maiden name, especially when doing business.) oversaw its growth and served as principal for more than forty years.

== Early life ==
The fifth of eight children and first daughter, Beulah Rucker was born on April 4, 1888 in the Harmony Grove community in Banks County, Georgia to Willis Rucker and Caroline Wiley, sharecroppers who both were former slaves and were never educated. From a young age, Rucker wanted to be a teacher; she read newspapers used as insulation for the family's house in order to learn the alphabet. Her first school, Neal's Grove, was located in a small church. Rucker went on to graduate from Jeruel Academy, run by the American Baptist Missionary Society, and the Knox Institute, operated by the Freedmen's Bureau, in Athens; she cleaned the principal's home to pay for room and board, telling him, "Here are my hands; they can work". Classmates called her "Baby" since she was the youngest girl. Rucker graduated with honors on May 28, 1909.

== Rucker Industrial School ==
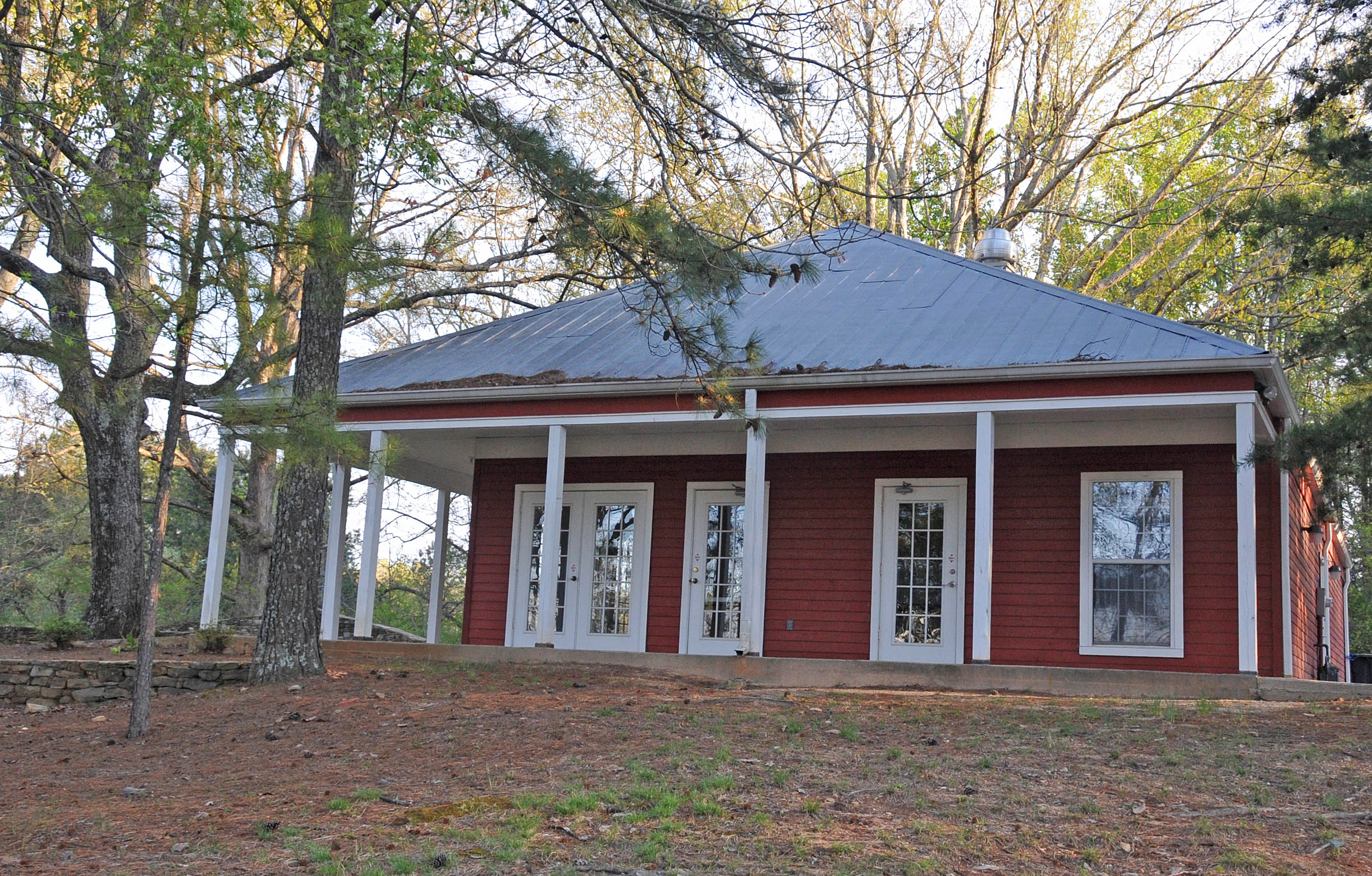
The Beulah Rucker Museum and Education Center, 2007.

Upset that Black students were often unable to attend many schools, Rucker decided to open a boarding school for African-Americans. She purchased a 12-acre plot of land along Athens Highway in Gainesville in 1911; in 1914, she purchased another plot on Norwood Street and used salvaged material, including lumber taken from the Piedmont Hotel in Gainesviile, home of Confederate Gen. James Longstreet, to found the Beulah Rucker Industrial School. (Note: Also known as Gainesville High and Industrial School for Colored; Timber Ridge Elementary School; and the Beulah Rucker School.) Some of the bricks used in construction were made by students learning brickmasonry. Rucker's students called her "Godmother".

Rucker wrote in the Atlanta Independent on July 15, 1911, that

We want to instill in the minds of our students that work is the law of our being, the great principle that carries our race upward. We want this school to help destroy the drawback to our race, and that's idleness. We can accomplish this through labor. "Labor conquers all things."

During the Great Depression, Rucker purchased a Ford Model T for use as a school bus. Rucker was the first African-American woman to have a school awarded a grant from the Rosenwald Fund in 1920; the funds, which continued through the 1920s, were used to build a cannery, dormitory, and workshop (no longer standing) on the school grounds, and a high school was added, causing attendance to rise to nearly 200. Part of the education was focused on Christianity, and Rucker warned students against "the evils of dancing, playing cards, and drinking alcohol".

Sometime between 1949 and 1950, the main building of the school burned down. In 1951, Rucker established a night school aimed at helping Black Korean War veterans complete their GEDs.

The Rucker Industrial School closed in 1958 when it was absorbed into the local school district. Even after the school's closure, African-American Boy Scout and Girl Scout troops continued to use the facilities.

During this time, Rucker earned a living by teaching in private and public schools; creating and selling hats; and giving music lessons.

== Personal life and later years ==
Rucker married Reverend Byrd Oliver, who fled Forsyth County and brought four children from a previous marriage, c. 1914; she continued using her maiden name when doing business, and signed her name "Beulah Rucker Oliver". The couple had four children: Garfield, born 1916; Dorothy Oliver, born 1919; Carrie N., born 1925; and Elvernia, born 1929. Byrd Oliver died in 1947.

Rucker graduated from Savannah State College (then Georgia State College) in 1944 at the age of 56. She published an autobiography, The Rugged Pathway, in 1953.

Beulah Rucker Oliver died on February 27, 1963, at the age of 74. She was a devout Baptist.

== Legacy ==
The Gainesville-based Beulah Rucker Museum and Education Center, founded by Rucker's daughters in her honor, is named after her. In 1971, money was raised to convert the property to the Beulah Rucker Memorial Community Center. It was added to the National Register of Historic Places on May 4, 1995 and fully restored by 1996.

Rucker was added to the Georgia Women of Achievement Hall of Fame on March 8, 2012. In 2013, the Beulah Rucker Oliver Memorial Intersection was named in her honor, located in front of the Rucker Museum.
