= Beulah Rucker House-School =

- U.S. National Register of Historic Places
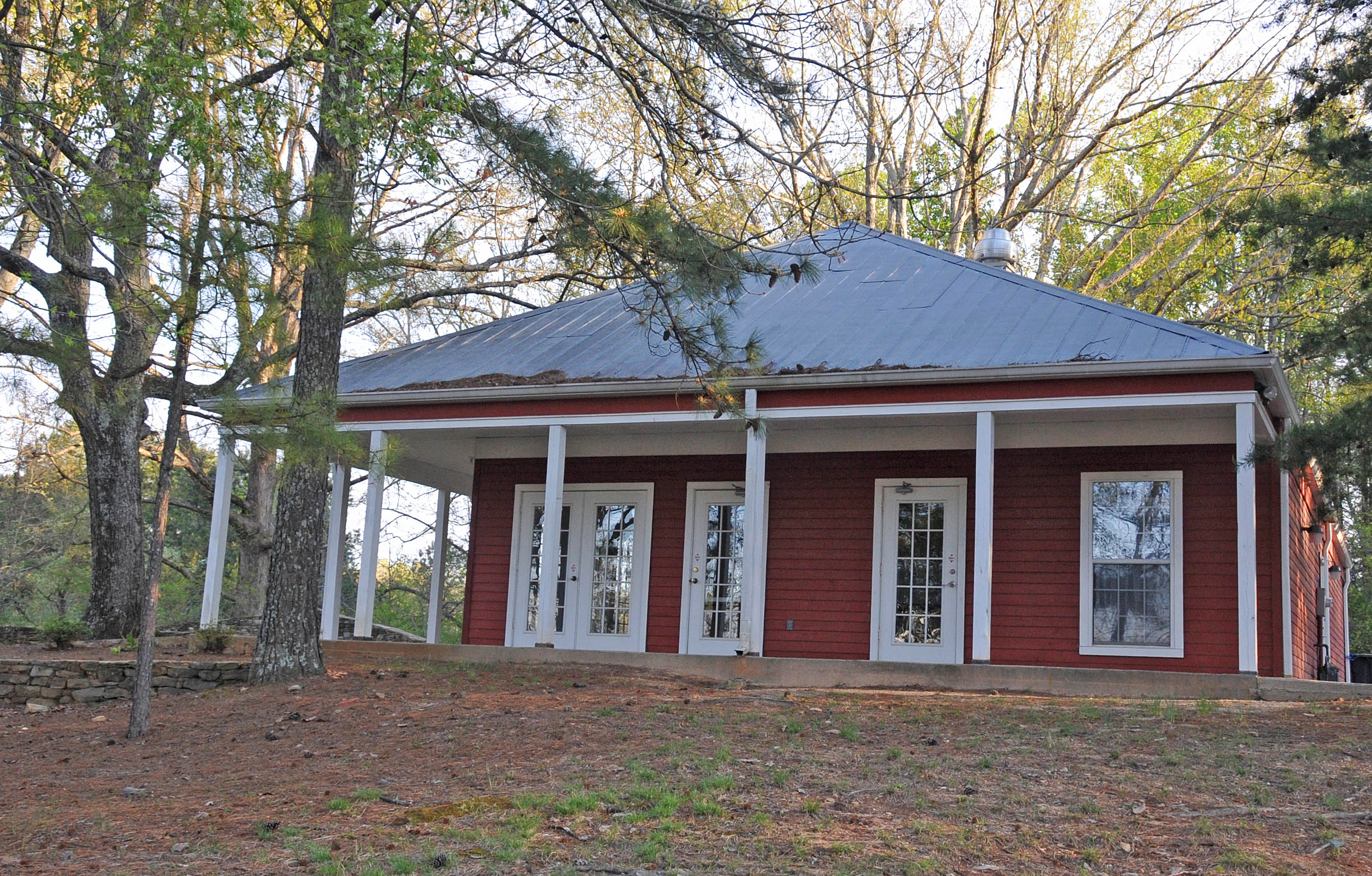
- The school in 2007

- Location within Georgia Location within the United States
- Nearest city: Gainesville, Georgia
- Coordinates: 34°16′54″N 83°47′16″W
- Area: 5 acres (2.0 ha)
- Built: 1915
- Built by: Beulah Rucker, Byrd Oliver
- NRHP reference No.: 95000533
- Added to NRHP: May 4, 1995

The Beulah Rucker House-School is a historic building in Gainesville, Georgia. It was built in 1915 by Beulah Rucker Oliver, an African-American educator, as a historically black school until 1920, when it received funding for the construction of more buildings adjacent to this one from the Rosenwald Fund. Oliver, her husband and their four children lived in the house until she died in 1963. It has been listed on the National Register of Historic Places since May 4, 1995. It is now known as the Beulah Rucker Museum.
