= Jeruel Academy =

Coordinates: 33°57.015′N 83°22.96′W

Jeruel Academy was a school for African Americans established in Athens, Georgia in 1881. Classes were originally held at Landrum Chapel, part of Ebenezer Baptist Church, West. The school was organized by the Rev. Collins Henry Lyons. A school building was constructed in 1886. Courses included English, Greek, Latin, French, history, mathematics, public speaking, agriculture, sewing, cooking, music, and printing. The school was merged with three others in 1924 to become part of Union Baptist Institute. After Baptist institute was dissolved during the desegregation era the building was demolished in 1956. The site, once located in the Linnentown neighborhood, is now part of the University of Georgia campus and commemorated by a historical marker. An image of the building by Jackson Davis shows a three-story structure with some window openings in the roofline. Hampton Collins Moon went to school at Jeruel Academy and worked as a steward for several terms while he was there to earn some money. Numerous alumni of Atlanta Baptist College taught at the school.

== Alumni ==
- Beulah Rucker Oliver
