= Russell Hall (Georgia) =

Coordinates: 33°57′0″N 83°22′54″W

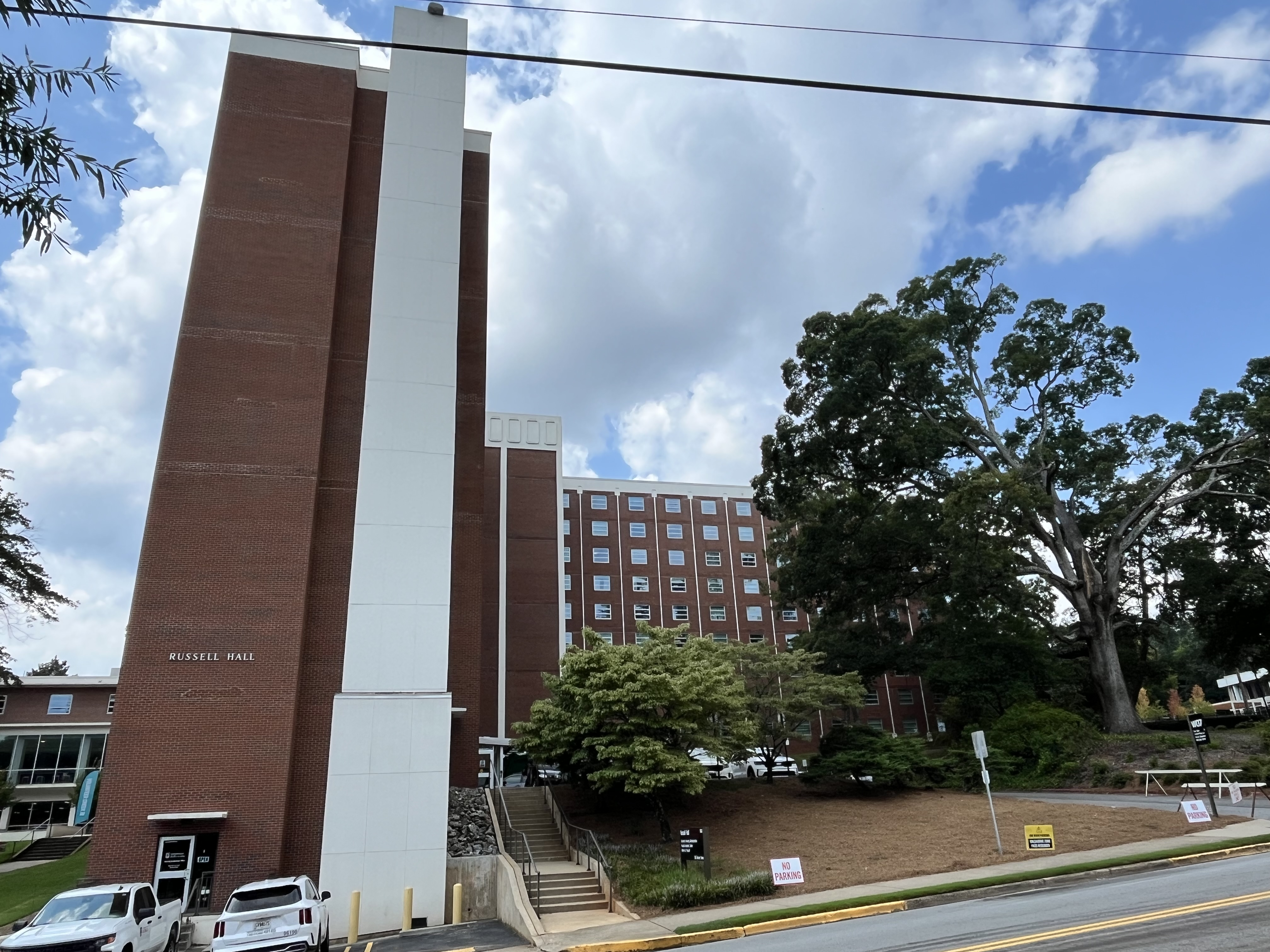
Russell Hall

Russell Hall is a co-ed dormitory for first-year students at the University of Georgia in Athens, Georgia. It is named after former governor of Georgia and United States Senator Richard B. Russell Jr., who was a segregationist.

This residence hall is located on the corner of Baxter Street and South Finley, on the location of the former Linnentown neighborhood, along with four other freshman, high rise dormitories. The residence hall is co-ed and houses 965 students. Most rooms house two people and are equipped with beds, dressers, desks, and a closet. The dormitory has community restrooms on each hall along with a study lounge and warming kitchen on alternating floors. The Russell Academic Center, located on the first floor, provides a quiet place for students to study as well as meeting rooms. This space is open for all students from 8 AM to 8 PM. There is a laundry facility on the third floor as well as an additional space for students to study and gather, with study rooms, a TV lounge, and a full kitchen with an ice machine. Students can participate in Russell Student Government or they can get involved with other activities through Russell. During the 2017–2018 school year, Russell Hall was closed for renovation and reopened for the 2018–2019 school year.
