= James B. Simmons House =

Historic house in Georgia, United States

- U.S. National Register of Historic Places
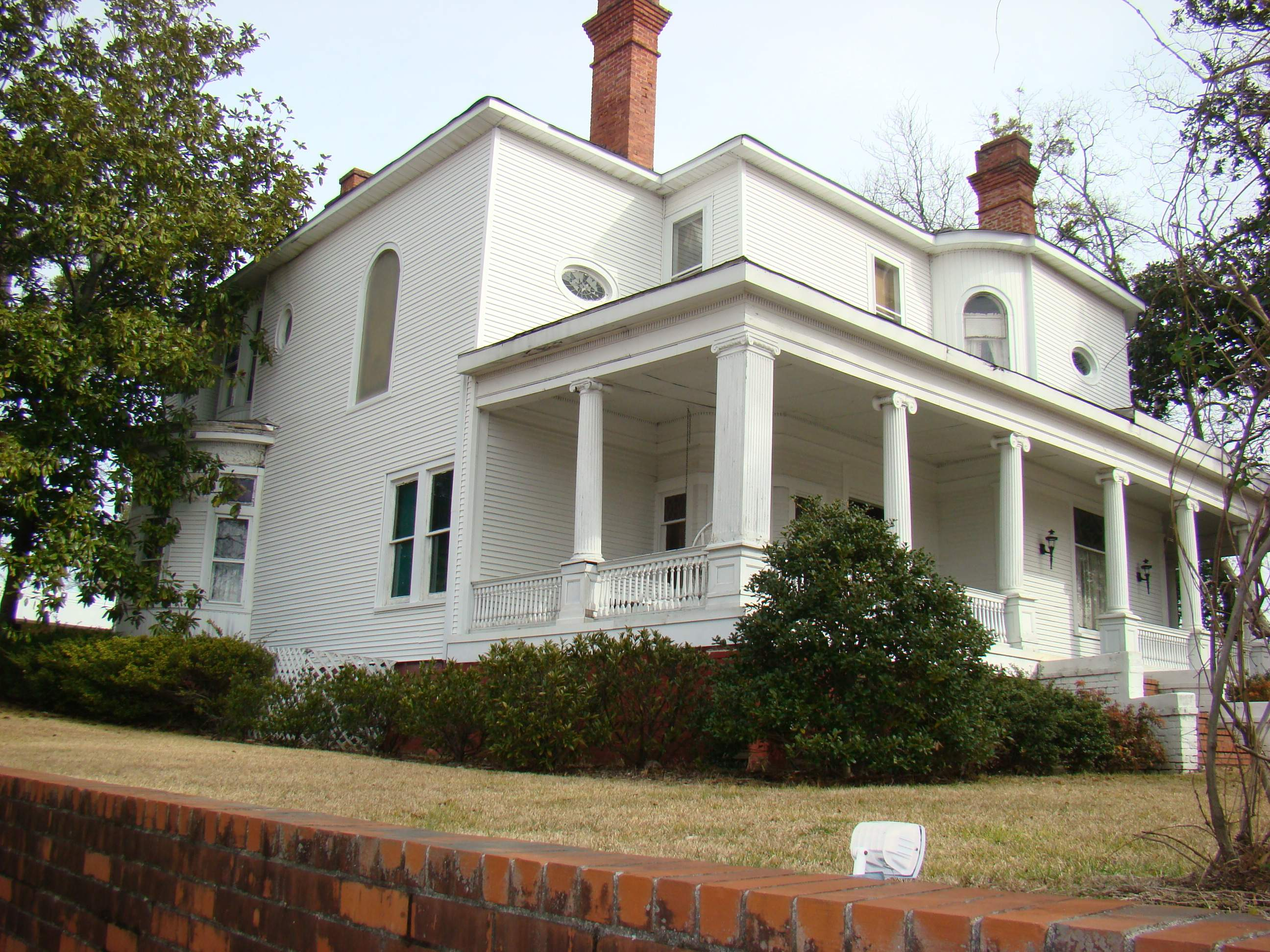
- The James B. Simmons House

- Location within Georgia
- Location: Toccoa, Georgia
- Coordinates: 34°34′50″N 83°19′53″W
- Built: 1903
- Built by: E.L. Prater
- Architectural style: Classical Revival, Queen Anne
- NRHP reference No.: 83000241
- Added to NRHP: April 7, 1983

The James B. Simmons House, also known as the Simmons-Bond House, was built in 1903 in Toccoa, Georgia by the noted Georgia architect E. Levi Prater for James B. Simmons, a successful lumberman. The main occupants of the house have been the James B. Simmons and the Julius Belton Bond families. The property was added to the United States National Register of Historic Places in 1983.

== Architecture ==
The house, located in downtown Toccoa, Georgia across from the county courthouse, is representative of the frame Queen Anne Style Greek Revival houses built in Northern Georgia around the turn of the Twentieth century.

Lumberman Simmons' utilized oak extensively throughout the house. Features include a built-in oak china cabinet, carved oak newel posts, dentil molding, extensive oak panels, oak pocket doors, and oak flooring.

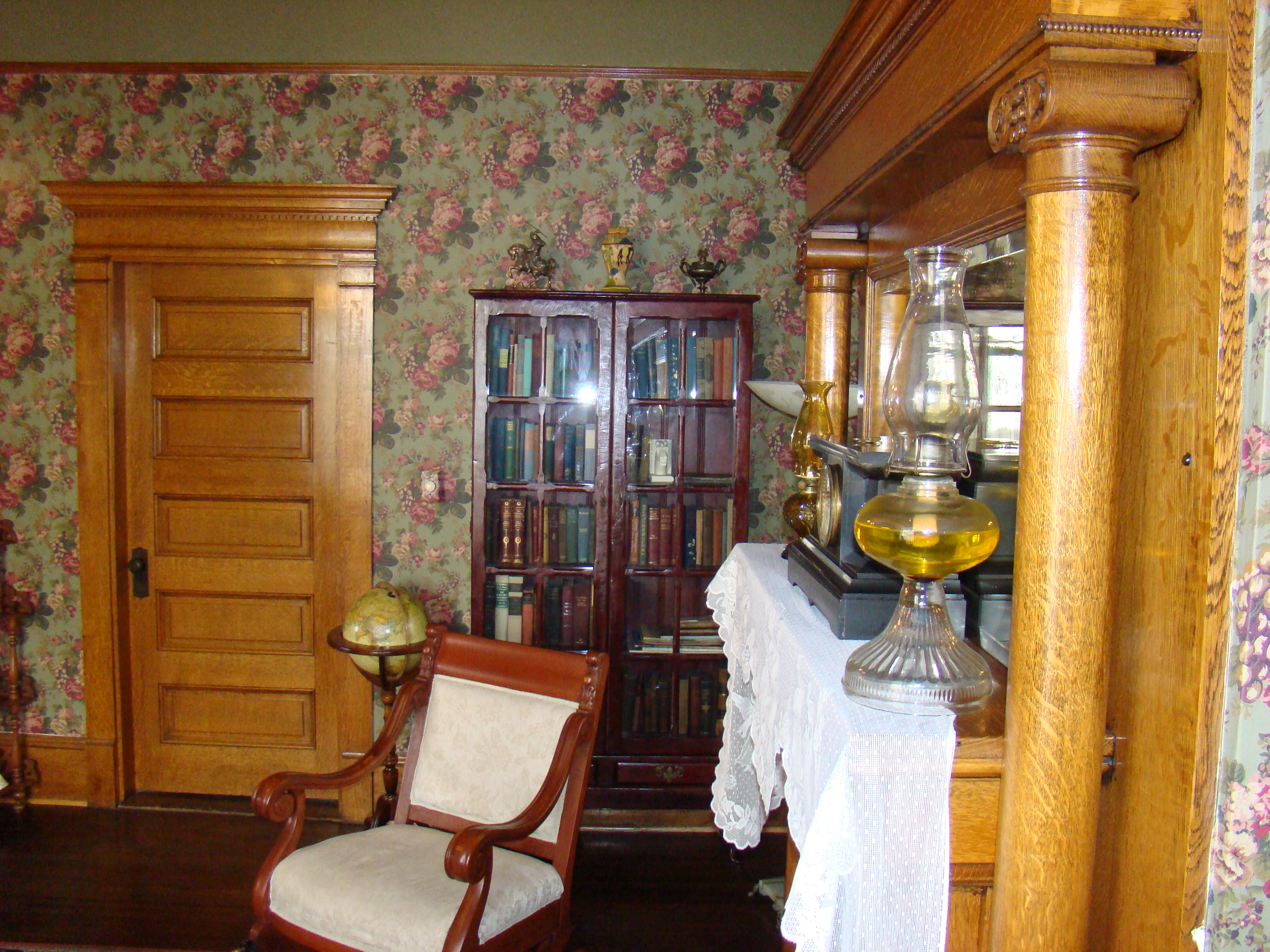
Simmons-Bond House parlor

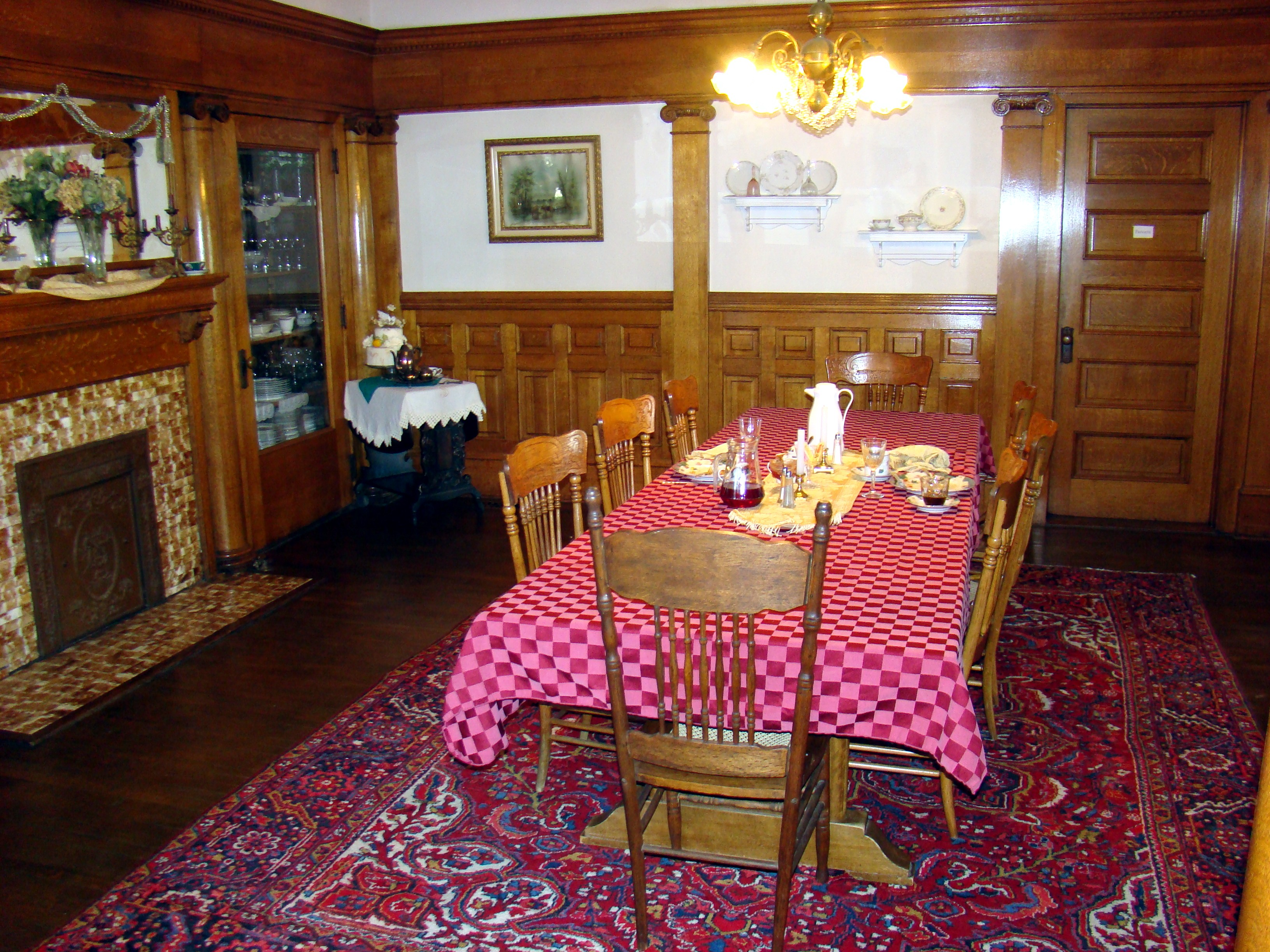
Simmons-Bond House dining room

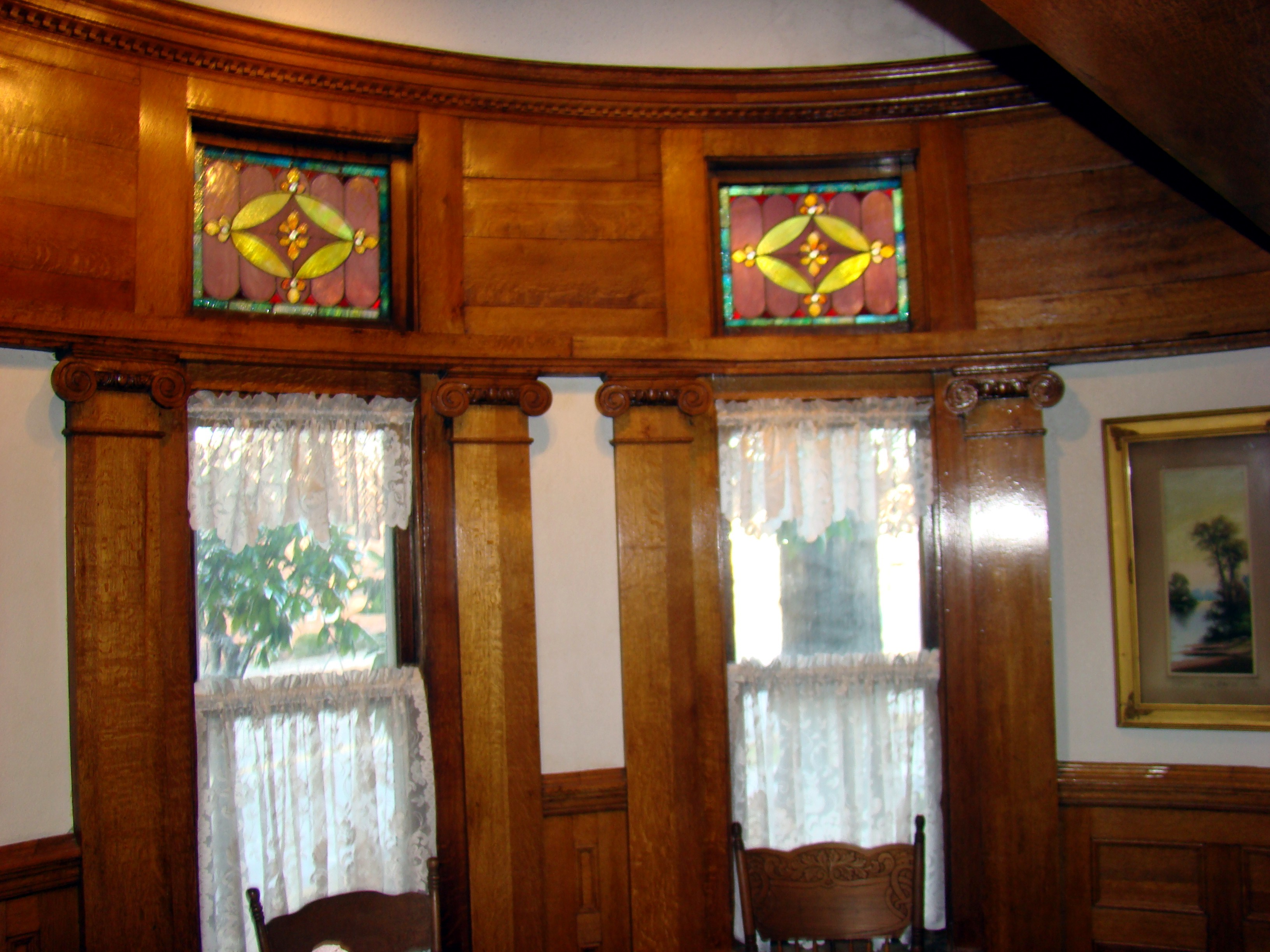
View of the dining room alcove detailing the stained glass windows, pillars, and decorative dentil molding.

It was built by master builder and Toccoa resident E.L. Prater (1872-1950), who also built the NRHP-listed Walters-Davis House (1906) and the Stephens County Jail in Toccoa, a bank in Taylorsville, Georgia, and the Candler Street School (1911) in Gainesville, Georgia.
