= Linnentown =

Coordinates: 33°57.015′N 83°22.96′W

Linnentown was a Black neighborhood in Athens, Georgia that was destroyed in the 1960s by an urban renewal project of the University of Georgia (UGA) and the city government of Athens. Comprising an area of 22 acres, the neighborhood had about fifty families who were forced out, via eminent domain, to make room for student housing for UGA; the dormitories, Russell Hall, Creswell Hall, and Brumby Hall now stand on the site. UGA associate professor of geography, Jerry Shannon, estimates that the combination of undervaluing the property at the time of sale and forcing residents into areas "of the city where property values have not climbed as quickly" has cost residents over $5 million of generational wealth.

== Activism and reparations ==
In 2018, while doing research on wage suppression by universities, Joseph Carter found information about the "Urban Renewal Project GA. R-50", which encompassed the homes in the Linnentown neighborhood. He met Geneva Johnson and then Hattie Thomas Whitehead, two former residents of Linnentown; they along with three other former residents began The Linnentown Project in September 2019. Project members made a resolution pushing for reparations, including financial and a memorial on the site; there is a historical marker for Jeruel Academy a school for Black children once located in the neighborhood, but no other signs of the community that once existed there. In February 2021, Athens Mayor, Kelly Girtz, issued an apology for the role the city had played in destroying Linnentown. His apology was followed by a unanimous approval by the Athens-Clarke County Commission in favor of redress for Linnentown, including establishment of the Athens Justice and Memory project and creation of a memory wall. The University of Georgia issued a statement saying that "it 'respectfully disagree[s]' with the 'conclusions' of the Linnentown Project"; it has further blocked efforts to create a memorial mosaic on the former site of Linnentown.
