= Old Hall County Courthouse (Georgia) =

- Hall County Courthouse
- U.S. National Register of Historic Places
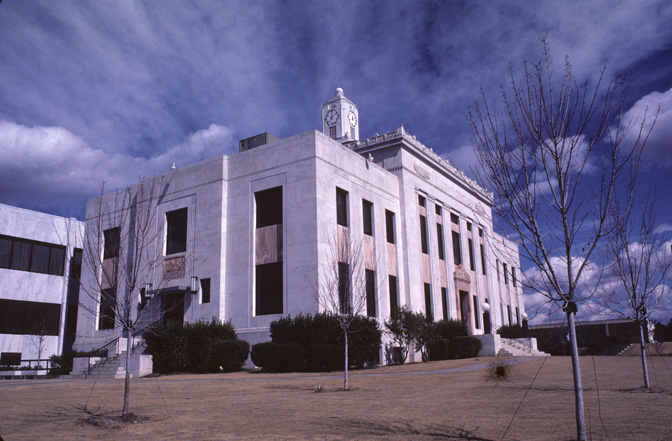
- 1981 courthouse photograph by Calvin Beale.

- Location within Georgia Location within the United States
- Location: 116 Spring Street SE; Gainesville, Georgia 30501
- Coordinates: 34°17′56″N 83°49′32″W
- Built: 1937; 1975 (addition)
- Architect: Daniell & Beutell
- Architectural style: Stripped Classical
- NRHP reference No.: 95000717
- Added to NRHP: June 8, 1995

The Old Hall County Courthouse is a historic county courthouse in Gainesville, Georgia. It was added to the National Register of Historic Places on June 8, 1995. It is located at the junction of Spring Street and Green Street. It was built in 1937 with an addition at the rear in 1975.

The courthouse was designed by the Atlanta architecture firm of Daniell & Beutell in the Stripped Classical style. The courthouse was built after a previous county courthouse, built in 1884, was destroyed by a devastating 1936 tornado. The courthouse construction was partially funded by federal emergency relief for rebuilding. A new courthouse adjacent to the older courthouse was built in 2000-2002.

== Gallery ==
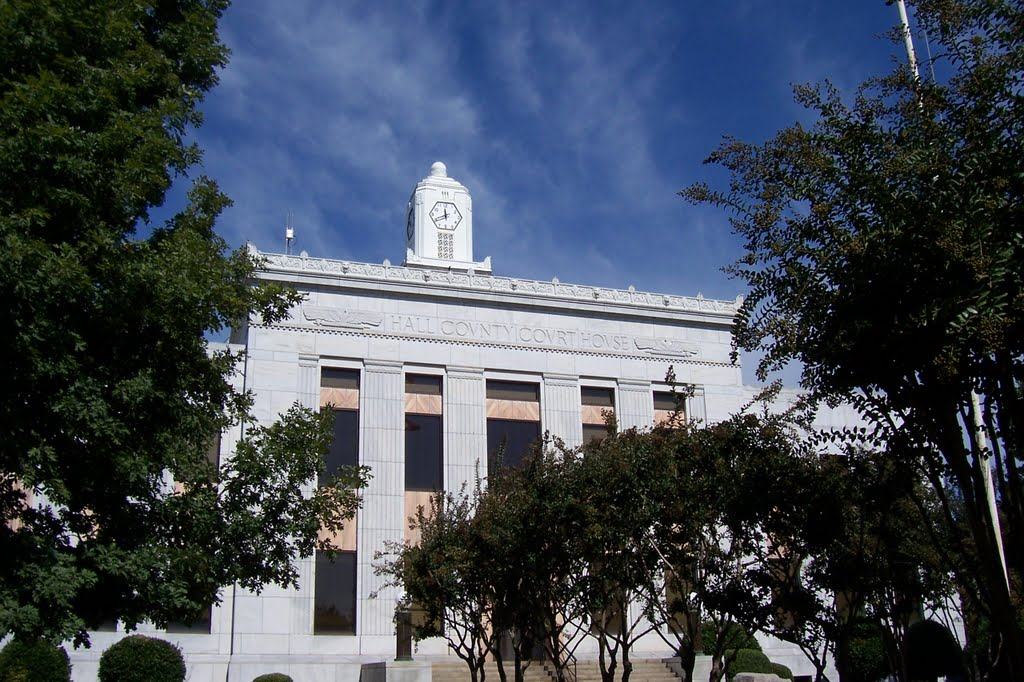

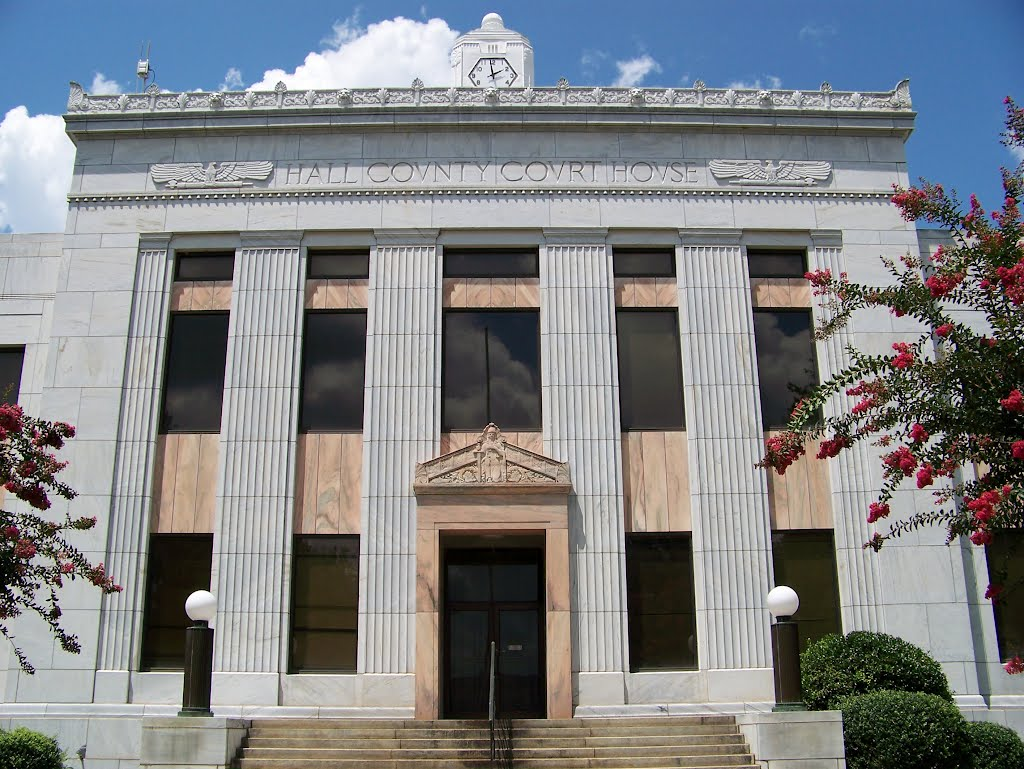

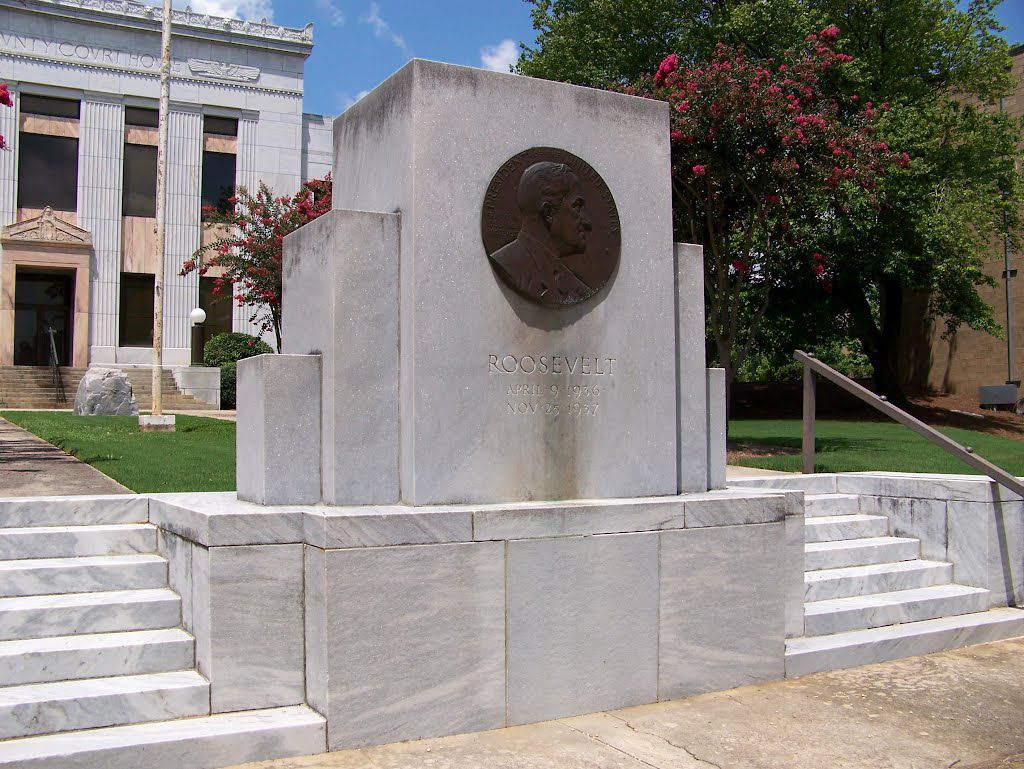
FDR Memorial located in the Courthouse Square

== See also ==
- Federal Building and U.S. Courthouse (Gainesville, Georgia)
- National Register of Historic Places listings in Hall County, Georgia
