= Empire Manufacturing Company Building =

- U.S. National Register of Historic Places
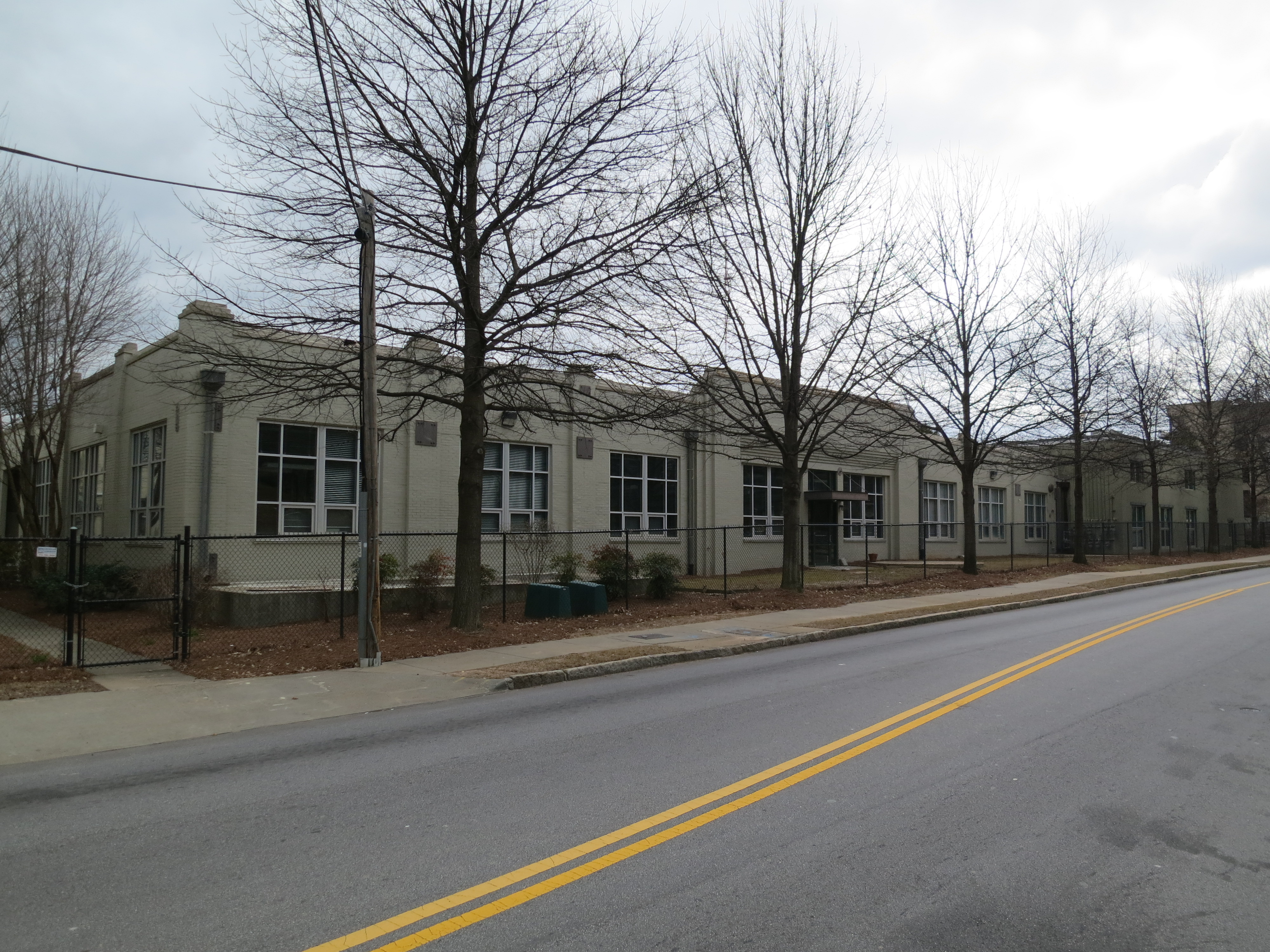
- As seen fronting Glen Iris Dr.

- Location within Atlanta Location within Georgia Location within the United States
- Location: 575 Glen Iris Drive, NE, Atlanta, Georgia
- Coordinates: 33°46′12.82″N 84°22′1.43″W
- Area: 2.3 acres (0.93 ha)
- Built: 1939
- Built by: Jackson & Edney
- Architectural style: Art Deco
- NRHP reference No.: 02000078
- Added to NRHP: February 20, 2002

The Empire Manufacturing Company Building located in the Old Fourth Ward neighborhood of Atlanta, Georgia.

The building was built in 1939 by the North Carolina firm of Jackson & Edney for the National Linen Service Corporation which in 1962, merged with Zep to become National Service Industries, Inc. In the late 1990s, renovation of the building was started to convert the building into loft office space as a part of the Southern Dairies redevelopment. In February 2002, the building was added the National Register of Historic Places.

The building was built with "a clear span truss system that permitted a 95-foot span without any supporting members to break up the floor space". It has Art Deco architecture.

== See also ==
- Southern Dairies, located on the same block, also NRHP-listed
