= Candler Street School =

- U.S. National Register of Historic Places
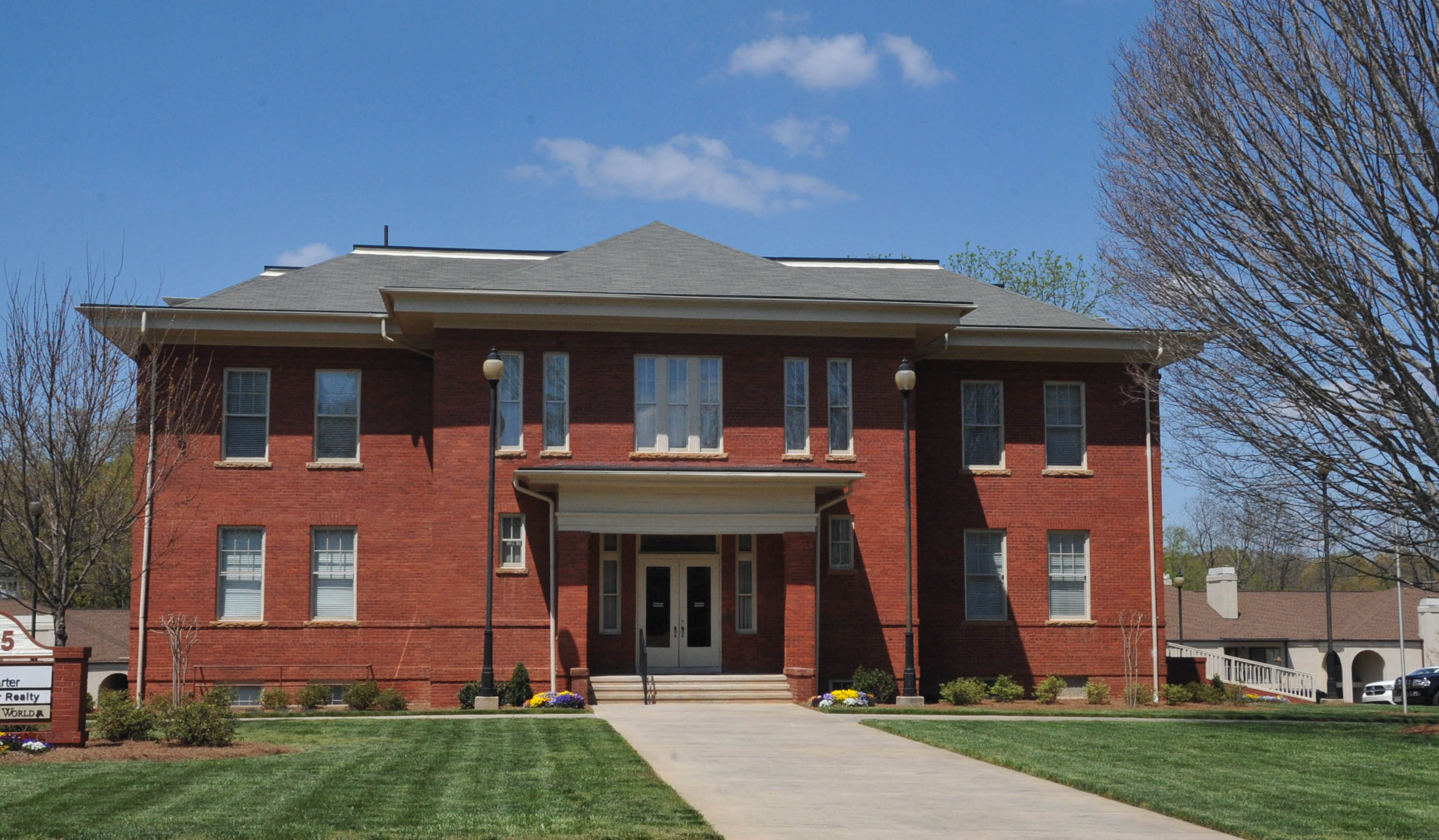

- Location within Georgia
- Location: 525 Candler St., Gainesville, Georgia
- Coordinates: 34°18′27″N 83°49′29″W
- Area: less than one acre
- Built: 1911
- Built by: Loden & Prater
- Architect: Cunningham Bros.
- Architectural style: Georgian Revival
- NRHP reference No.: 82002447
- Added to NRHP: September 30, 1982

The Candler Street School, on Candler St. in Gainesville, Georgia, was built in 1911. It was listed on the National Register of Historic Places in 1982.

It was designed by Cunningham Bros., architects, in Georgian Revival style.

It was built by Loden & Prater. Master builder E.L. Prater (1872-1950) also built the NRHP-listed Walters-Davis House (1906), the NRHP-listed James B. Simmons House (1903), and the Stephens County Jail, all in Toccoa, Georgia, and a bank in Taylorsville, Georgia.
