= Southern Dairies =

- U.S. National Register of Historic Places
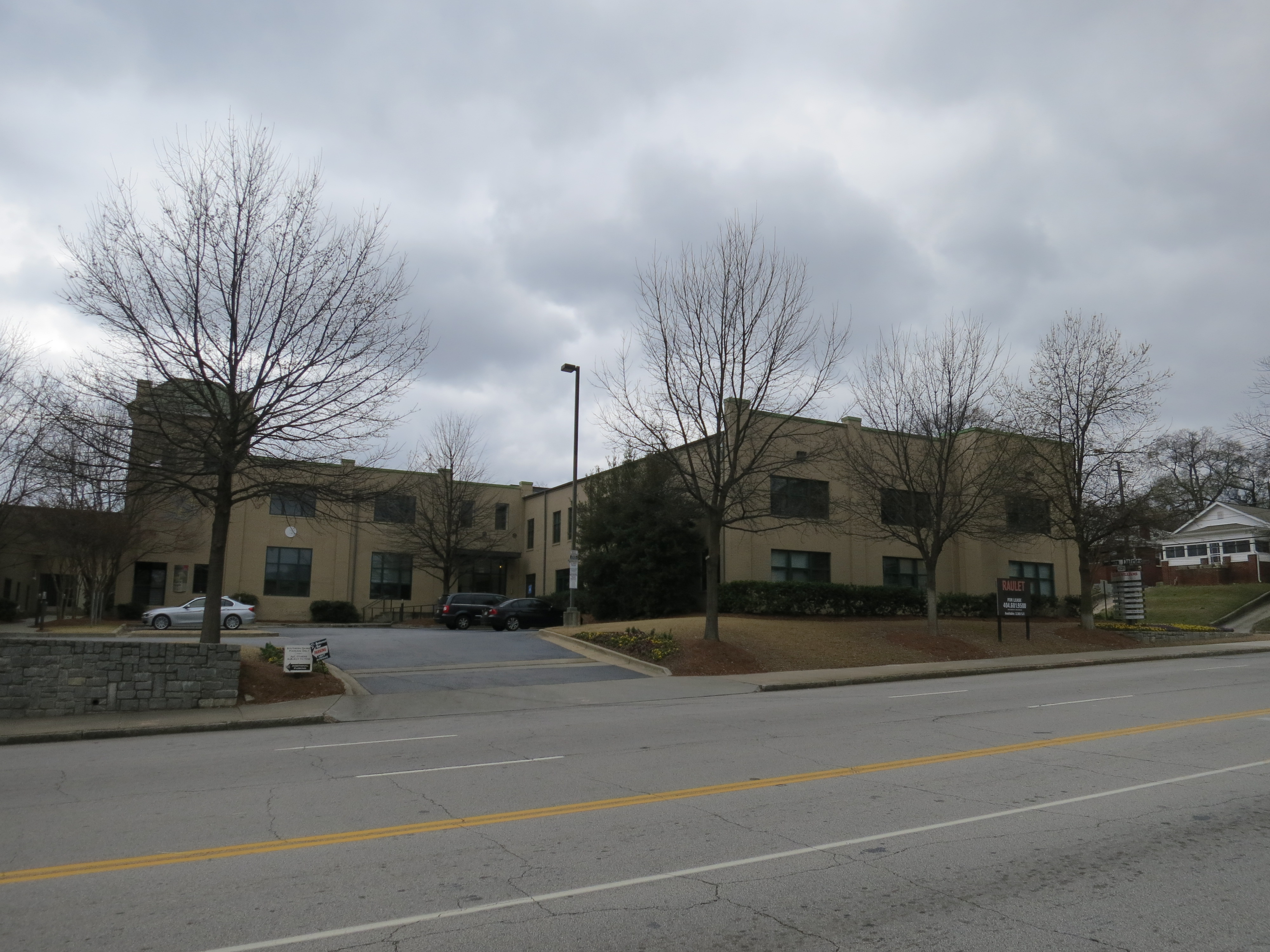
- As seen fronting North Avenue

- Location within Atlanta Location within Georgia Location within the United States
- Location: 593 Glen Iris Drive, NE, Atlanta, Georgia
- Coordinates: 33°46′12.82″N 84°22′1.43″W
- Area: 0.3381 acres (0.1368 ha)
- Architectural style: Art Deco
- NRHP reference No.: 02000872
- Added to NRHP: August 21, 2002

Southern Dairies is a loft office redevelopment of a former dairy production facility and the Empire Manufacturing Company Building located in the Old Fourth Ward neighborhood of Atlanta, Georgia.

The primary building was built in the early 1900s as a milk distribution facility. The Empire Manufacturing Company Building facing Glen Iris Dr. was built in the 1939. In the late 1990s, renovation was started to convert the buildings into loft office space. Southern Dairies is often credited as being one of the first warehouse conversions in the Old Fourth Ward neighborhood of Atlanta. In August 2002 the building was added the National Register of Historic Places.

The project is located at the intersection of Glen Iris Dr and North Avenue next to the planned Jamestown development Ponce City Market.

In October 2019, Jamestown purchased Southern Dairies campus for approximately $34.5 million.
