= Telfair Center for the Arts =

- South Georgia College Administration Building
- U.S. National Register of Historic Places
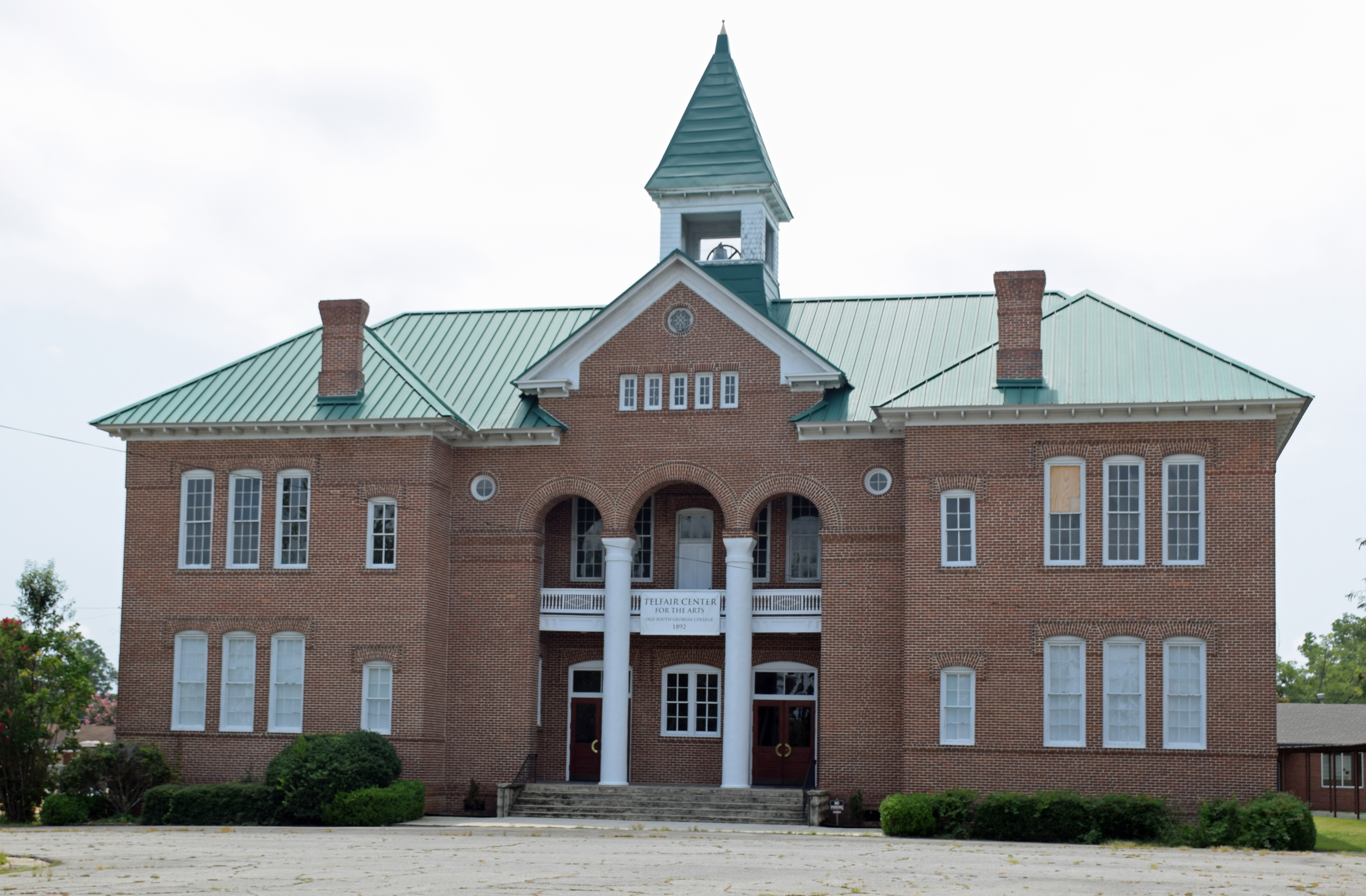

- Location within Georgia
- Interactive map showing the location of Telfair Center for the Arts
- Location: College St., McRae, Georgia
- Coordinates: 32°4′5″N 82°54′37″W
- Area: less than one acre
- Built: 1892
- Architectural style: Late Victorian
- NRHP reference No.: 80001243
- Added to NRHP: October 16, 1980

The Telfair Center for the Arts is a 501c3 charitable nonprofit in Telfair County, Georgia. It occupies a historic building which was renovated for its use, the South Georgia College Administration Building of South Georgia College on College St. in McRae, Georgia.

The building is Late Victorian-style and was built in 1892. It was listed on the National Register of Historic Places in 1980. It is two-story brick building supported by load-bearing brick masonry and also by a heavy timber frame. It has third level with an attic room and a tower, and there is an attached auditorium wing. Its front facade includes a central recessed two-story entrance with a balcony on its second level.

It was deemed significant in architecture

as an example of the main building of a co-educational institution that was organized and sponsored by the Methodist Church....The architect's use of brick and simplistic details for this late Victorian building emphasize the un-ostentatious approach the church sought for the curriculum itself. The strict Christian ethics to be taught at South Georgia College appear to be outlined in the earliest photographs of the building. It certainly gave the impression of a building where authority was imposed and was modeled, no doubt, after earlier college buildings within the state and elsewhere.

It was also deemed

significant in the history of education in Georgia because of the role the school played in the South Georgia Conference of the Methodist Church. The need for a school of higher education in the region crystalized at a meeting of the Conference in May of 1891 in nearby Montgomery County. Once the Conference decided to sponsor a school that included two years of college, several towns vied for the honor of its location. At the annual conference in 1892, McRae won the vote, since it offered the best proposal and had a "high moral tone."

The school opened in January 1893 with 65 students.
