= Clermont Residential Historic District =

Historic district in Georgia, United States

- U.S. National Register of Historic Places
- Location within Georgia
- Location: Main, Harris, Martin, and Railroad Sts., Clermont, Georgia
- Coordinates: 34°28′46″N 83°46′24″W
- Area: 19 acres (7.7 ha)
- Built by: Multiple
- Architectural style: Late 19th And 20th Century Revivals, Bungalow/craftsman, Late Victorian
- NRHP reference No.: 85001970
- Added to NRHP: September 5, 1985

The Clermont Residential Historic District, in Clermont, Georgia, is a 19 acres (7.7 ha) historic district which was listed on the National Register of Historic Places in 1985.

It includes parts of Main, Harris, Martin, and Railroad Streets. The listing included 18 contributing buildings.

It includes:

- Haynes Residence, a two-story, wood-framed, Victorian Eclectic structure on the east side of Main Street
- Roark House, a two-story, wood-framed Neoclassical-style structure with central monumental portico and one-story porch across the front facade
- Frank Rogers House, Classical Revival, on the west side of Railroad Street at the northwest corner of its intersection with Martin Street.
