= Bowman-Pirkle House =

- U.S. National Register of Historic Places
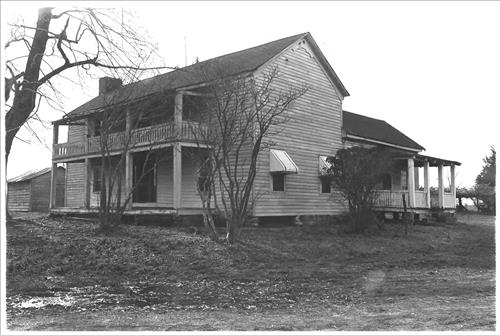

- Location within Georgia
- Location: NE of Buford off U.S. 23 on Friendship Rd., Buford, Georgia
- Coordinates: 34°08′33″N 83°57′16″W
- Area: 0 acres (0 ha)
- Built: 1818
- Built by: John Bowman
- Architectural style: Log Plantation Plain Type
- NRHP reference No.: 73000623
- Added to NRHP: August 14, 1973

The Bowman-Pirkle House is a historic two-story log house in Buford, Georgia.

It was built in 1818 for John Bowman, who served under General Andrew Jackson during the First Seminole War of 1816–1819. The house was built with the help of Cherokees as a token of the friendship between Bowman and Chief Major Ridge. According to Elizabeth Z. Macgregor of the Georgia State Commission, "this house is probably one of the earliest structures built and occupied by whites in this Indian territory." In 1890, it was acquired by Bowman's daughter Amanda and her husband, Noah Pirkle, who had served in the Confederate States Army during the American Civil War of 1861–1865. It was inherited by their descendants, who kept it in the family until 1969. In 1977, Golden Pirkle gave it to the Hall County Historical Society. The house was returned to Bowman's descendants around 2003.

== Location ==
The Bowman-Pirkle House has moved several times.

=== Original ===
The original location on Friendship Road is now a parking lot in the vicinity of a Truist bank, Zaxby's, and Holiday Inn Express.

=== Current ===
At present, the house is on the private property of John Bowman's great-grandson near the corner of Sardis Church Road & 2699 W. Rock Quarry Road in Buford (34°04'57.8"N 83°54'33.2"W). Driving directions

=== Previous locations ===
Initially the Hall County Historical Society recommended relocation into Gainesville on Queen City Parkway just off of Hwy. 360, Exit 5, however it was never moved to this location.

The house was moved to the Lake Lanier Natural History Museum near the Lake Lanier Islands Water Park in the 1980s. The house in its original location was vandalized extensively, therefore it was restored and relocated to the secure location. The original Bowman plantation was 7200 acres and had included the Lanier Islands, therefore the house would remain on its original land. It is thought construction of a new radio tower circa 2000 rendered the cabin unsafe, so its ownership was transferred back to the descendants of the Bowman family around 2003 where it was again transferred to a different location within the original 7200 acre property limits (2699 W. Rock Quarry Road, Buford GA).

== National Register of Historic Places ==
The house has been listed on the National Register of Historic Places since August 14, 1973:

"The Bowman-Pirkle House was built in 1818 on the Pirkle Ferry Road, now known as Friendship Road, near Flowery Branch, Georgia, in the southern portion of Hall County. It is basically a plantation plain type house with a double verandah and a later two-room, one story "cottage" addition with porch. The original main house was constructed of logs but has since been weatherboarded.

This three bay, weatherboarded house, elevated on flat bedrock, has a trabeated doorway with side lights. Its double verandah has square posts with flat bannisters that still remain on the upper porch. Around the gable edges is also a flat, scalloped wood trim. Originally there were no glazed windows, only shutters. Off the central hall, with its set of narrow stairs, are two larger rooms. The room on the right has a simple, delicately designed mantel on the rear wall, horizontal paneling boards in this room average about a foot in width. The room on the left does not have the original paneling, but a heavy mantel with the curved inset is an early mantel style. Upstairs, there apparently was only one finished room, the other area of which has no flooring or windows and apparently was never used.

Probably a later addition of about 1870 is the one story, three bay "cottage" adjoined on the rear, its square columned porch with plain bannisters faces east. To the rear of this two-room addition and to that of the main portion of the house is a continuous L-shaped shed porch. Part of the shed porch has been converted into a room on the rear of the main house portion.

One Stone chimney, original to the 1818 house, is on the west side of the house; another later chimney on the rear wall of the right room was probably added at the same time as the "cottage" portion.

A well house, several barns and a grape arbor are also on the property. Originally there was a covered oak-boarded walkway to the rear of the house, where the grape arbor is now, that led to a building that housed a kitchen, dining room and an upstairs bunkroom for the boys.

The Bowman-Pirkle House, a two-story log plantation plain type house; is significantly known to have been built by John Bowman with the help of Cherokee Indians in 1818 during a transition period when this area was being ceded to the U.S. government by the Cherokees. Important persons, including Andrew Jackson and Major Ridge, a Chief of the Cherokee Nation, visited in this house during Bowman's ownership and that of its later owner, Noah Pirkle. The house with few changes remained in the Pirkle family until 1969, at which time it was given to the Hall County Historical Society.

John Bowman, the builder of the Bowman-Pirkle House came to North Georgia when he was a volunteer courier for General Andrew Jackson's staff. In 1818 General Jackson rested his troops at the old "Young Tavern" [Robert Young Inn] above Flowery Branch, Georgia, en route to the Seminole Campaign. While here John Bowman visited Major Ridge, one of the Chiefs of the Cherokees who was holding an encampment nearby. At the end of this visit, Major Ridge gave John Bowman a sizable tract of land. Bowman detached himself from the General's staff and with the aid of Cherokee braves, built the two story log house in which he resided from 1818 to 1890. In about 1822, Bowman married Mary Smith of North Carolina, the same state in which he was born April 17, 1798. The title of "Doctor", Bowman earned by learning from the Indians herbal medicine; he planted these herbs by a stream about a mile from his house which came to be called "medicine hollow." He treated both Indians and whites and was well respected in this field. During his lifetime, Dr. Bowman also developed a large and practically self-sufficient plantation.

Bowman's daughter, Amanda, married Noah Pirkle in 1867. Noah Pirkle served in the Confederate Army, Co. "A", llth Georgia Regiment under Captain Bedell. When Sherman burned Atlanta, General John Brown Gordon sent some men to defend Athens. Their efforts kept the Federal troops from burning Athens. For three days the Federal troops attempted to cross the East Branch of the Oconee River. They suffered heavy casualties and decided to retreat. Noah Pirkle was one of the defending Confederate soldiers. They surrounded a large group of Federal troops, marched them for three days and then rested at the old John Bowman place. They placed the prisoners in the horse lot there. Seventeen men, including Pirkle, were drawn to do sentinel duty. Early the next morning Bowman invited these men in for breakfast. At the end of the meal, Pirkle looked at Amanda Pirkle who was helping to serve the table and said, "You are beautiful, if I am still alive when the War is over, I am going to come back and marry you." He kept his promise.

At John Bowman's death in 1890, Pirkle purchased a portion of the plantation which included the house. The house was passed through the Pirkle family until 1969.

The Bowman-Pirkle House is a fine example of the architecture of the early settlement of Indian lands. This area of Hall County was ceded by the Cherokees officially July 8, 1817, resulting in Bowman having to buy back 1818 land grants issued by Gov. George Troup. (Three of these land grants 250 acre tracts, selling for twelve to eighteen dollars each, are still among the Pirkle family papers.) Thus, this house is probably one of the earliest structures built and occupied by whites in this Indian territory.

Presently the house is located on Friendship Road; but now owned by the Hall County Historical Society. It will be moved to a location inside the city limits of Gainesville on Queen City Parkway just off of Hwy. 360, Exit 5 and replaced in a farm setting adjacent to a state approved welcome center. As directed by the State Review Board, the Bowman-Pirkle House is being nominated based on its present appearance and siting. After the structure's removal and restoration, the Board will reconsider the structure in the light of changes which may affect its qualifications as a National Register property."

-National Register of Historic Places Inventory - Nomination Form for Bowman-Pirkle House, 14 Aug 1973

== Slavery ==
As of 1861, 10 victims of slavery were captive on the Bowman plantation.

== Legacy ==
Some descendants of John Bowman own and manage historic properties of Buford including the Victor Hugo Allen mansion (son of Bona Allen).
