= Cairo Commercial Historic District =

Historic district in Georgia, United States

- U.S. National Register of Historic Places
- U.S. Historic district
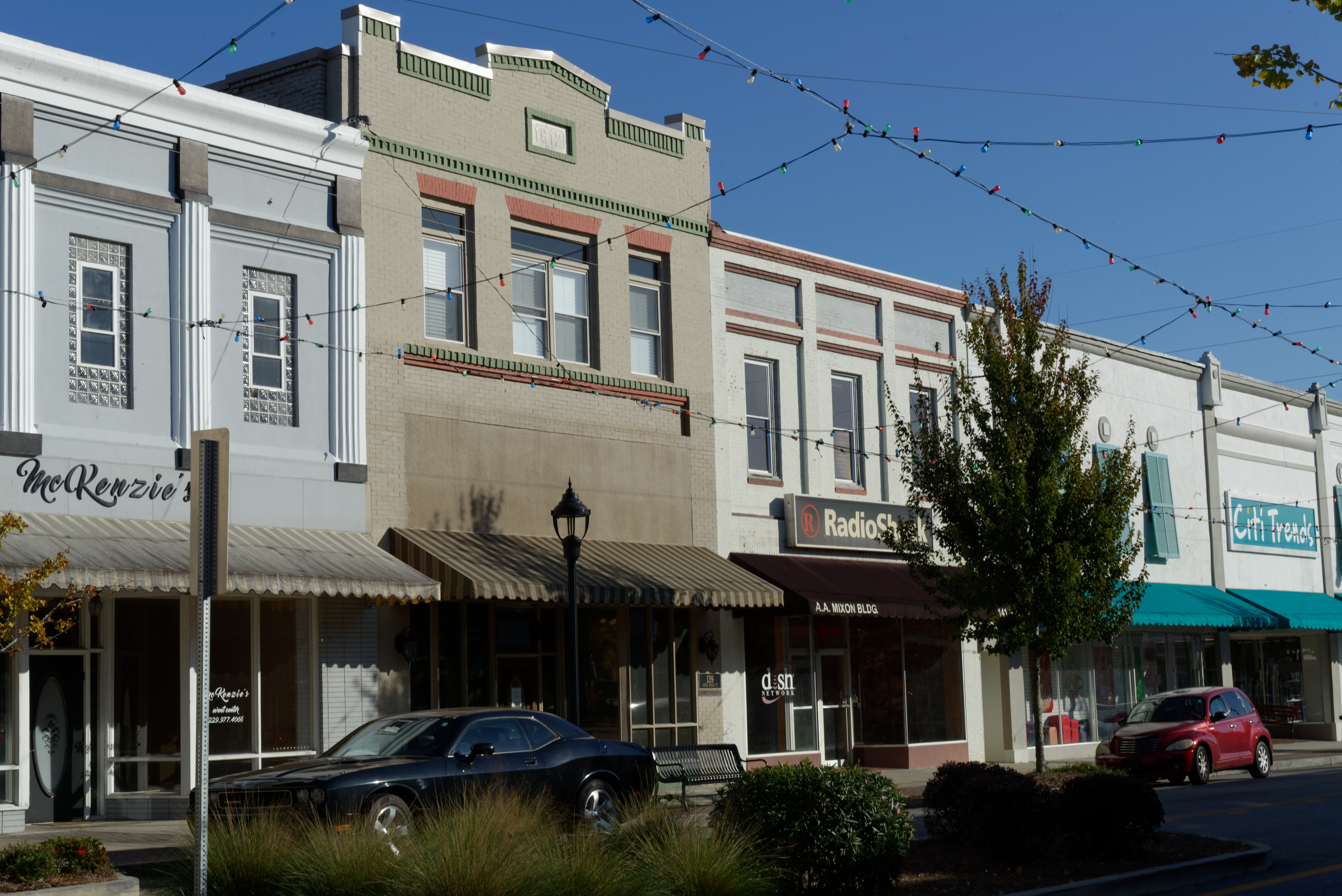
- Buildings on South Broad Ave.

- Location within Georgia Location within the United States
- Location: Roughly bounded by Broad St., Railroad Ave. and Martin Luther King Ave., with adjacent properties on 2nd Ave. and 1st St, Cairo, Georgia
- Coordinates: 30.876944°N 84.208889°W
- Area: 12 acres (4.9 ha)
- Built: 1866
- Architectural style: Art Deco, Classical Revival
- NRHP reference No.: 94000525
- Added to NRHP: May 26, 1994

The Cairo Commercial Historic District is a 12-acre (4.9 ha) historic district that was listed on the National Register of Historic Places in 1994.

It had 31 contributing buildings, mostly on North and South Broad Street, but also on Railroad Avenue and on Second Avenue and one on First Street.

It includes:

- Citizens Bank (c. 1908), 128 South Broad Street, a Neoclassical Revival building with a vault design
- 115 South Broad Street, a three-story building with paired stone pilasters
- Zebulon Theater (1936), 207 North Broad Street, a two-story, brick building with Art Deco influence
- United States Post Office (1935), 203 North Broad Street, a Stripped Classical building built with funds from the Federal Emergency Administration of Public Works (FEAPW, a Public Works Administration forerunner). It has a New Deal mural, "Products of Grady County", by Paul Ludwig Gill.
- Three, one-story brick warehouses (1909) on Railroad Avenue
- Cairo Depot (c.1880), formerly the Atlantic Coastline Depot, which in 1994 was the Cairo Police Station, a stucco-over-masonry building with overhanging eaves, brackets, and a large hipped roof.
- W. B. Roddenbery Building where cane syrup was produced for Walter Blair Roddenbery's business originated by his father, Dr. Seaborn Anderson Roddenbery. Seaborn Roddenbery was the son and grandson, respectively.
