= Dixie Hunt Hotel =

- U.S. National Register of Historic Places
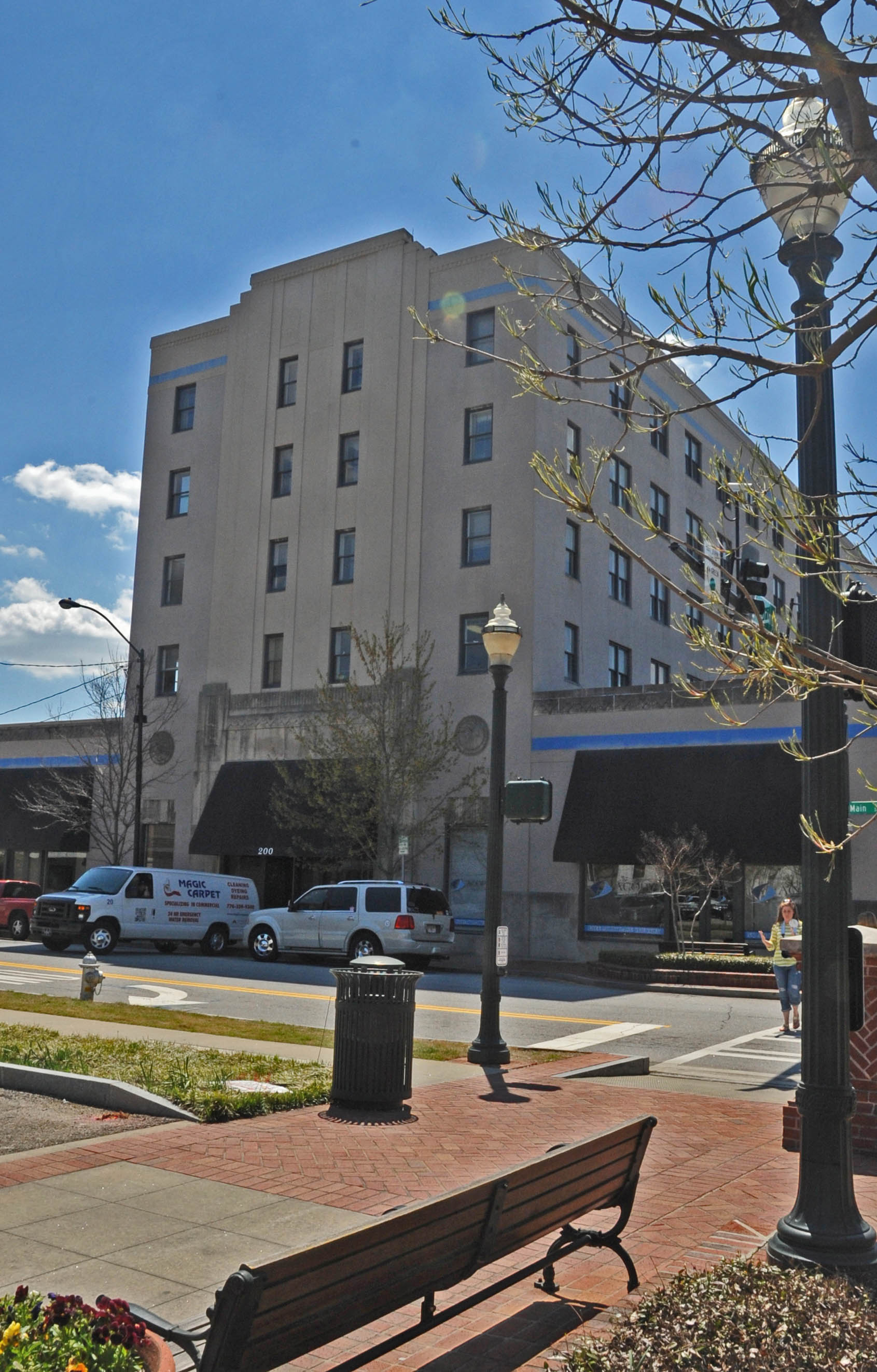
- The hotel in 2007

- Location within Georgia
- Location: 209 Spring Street, SW, Gainesville, Georgia
- Coordinates: 34°17′54″N 83°49′38″W
- Area: 0.4 acres (0.16 ha)
- Built: 1937
- Architect: William J.J. Chase
- Architectural style: Art Deco
- NRHP reference No.: 85001057
- Added to NRHP: May 16, 1985

The Dixie Hunt Hotel is a historic hotel building in Gainesville, Georgia. It was built in 1937 by Brenau University on the site of a former building donated to them by an alumna, the widow of businessman Jim Hunt. The university sold the building in 1969. It was designed in the Art Deco style by architect William J.J. Chase. The style is rare in Georgia; this is one of relatively few Art Deco buildings in the state. It has been listed on the National Register of Historic Places since May 16, 1985.
