= Federal Building and U.S. Courthouse (Gainesville, Georgia) =

- Federal Building and Courthouse
- U.S. National Register of Historic Places
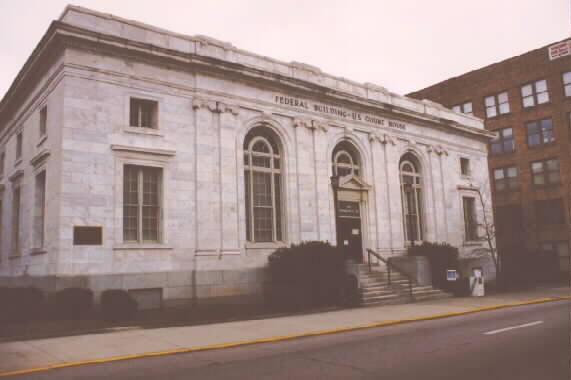
- Original Building/U.S. Post Office in 2003

- Location within Georgia Location within the United States
- Location: 126 Washington St., Gainesville, Georgia
- Coordinates: 34°17′59″N 83°49′34″W
- Built: 1910
- Architectural style: Classical Revival
- NRHP reference No.: 74000684
- Added to NRHP: January 24, 1974

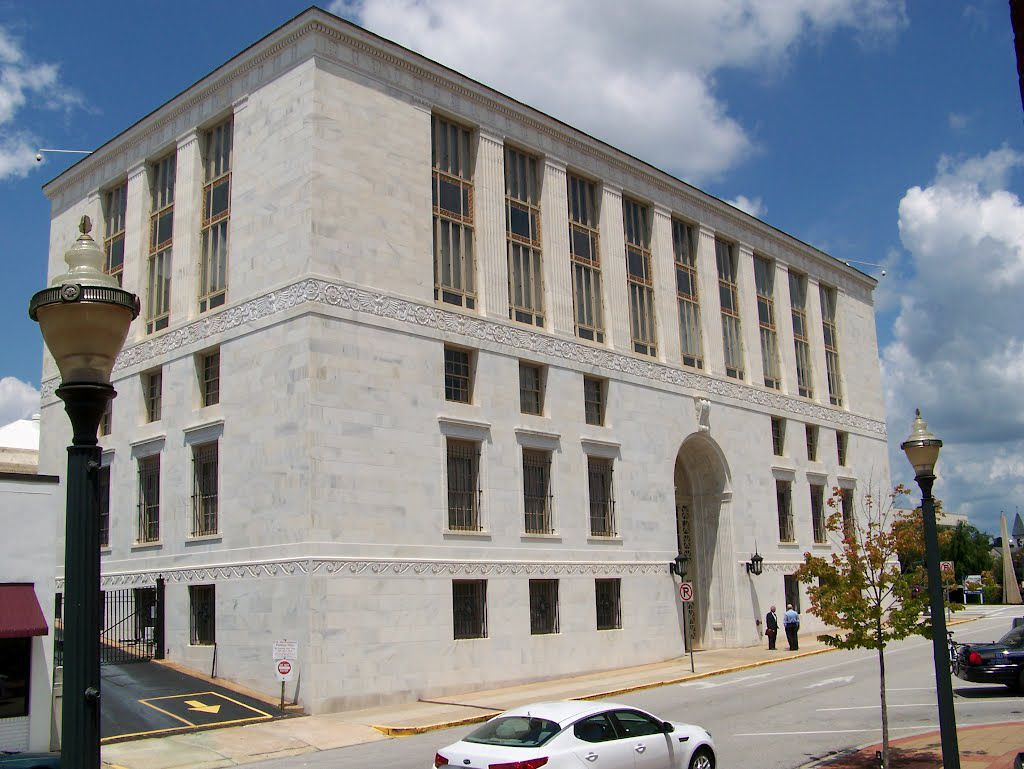
U.S. Courthouse facing Spring Street SE

The Federal Building and U.S. Courthouse is a historic building in Gainesville, Georgia, located at 126 Washington Street. It was added to the National Register of Historic Places on January 24, 1974. Part of the building was constructed in 1910 and used as a post office. James Knox Taylor designed it. The courthouse was constructed behind this building in 1936. The post office building is marble and both buildings are Neoclassical designs.

== See also ==
- Hall County Courthouse (Gainesville, Georgia)
- National Register of Historic Places listings in Hall County, Georgia
