= Jackson Building (Gainesville, Georgia) =

- U.S. National Register of Historic Places
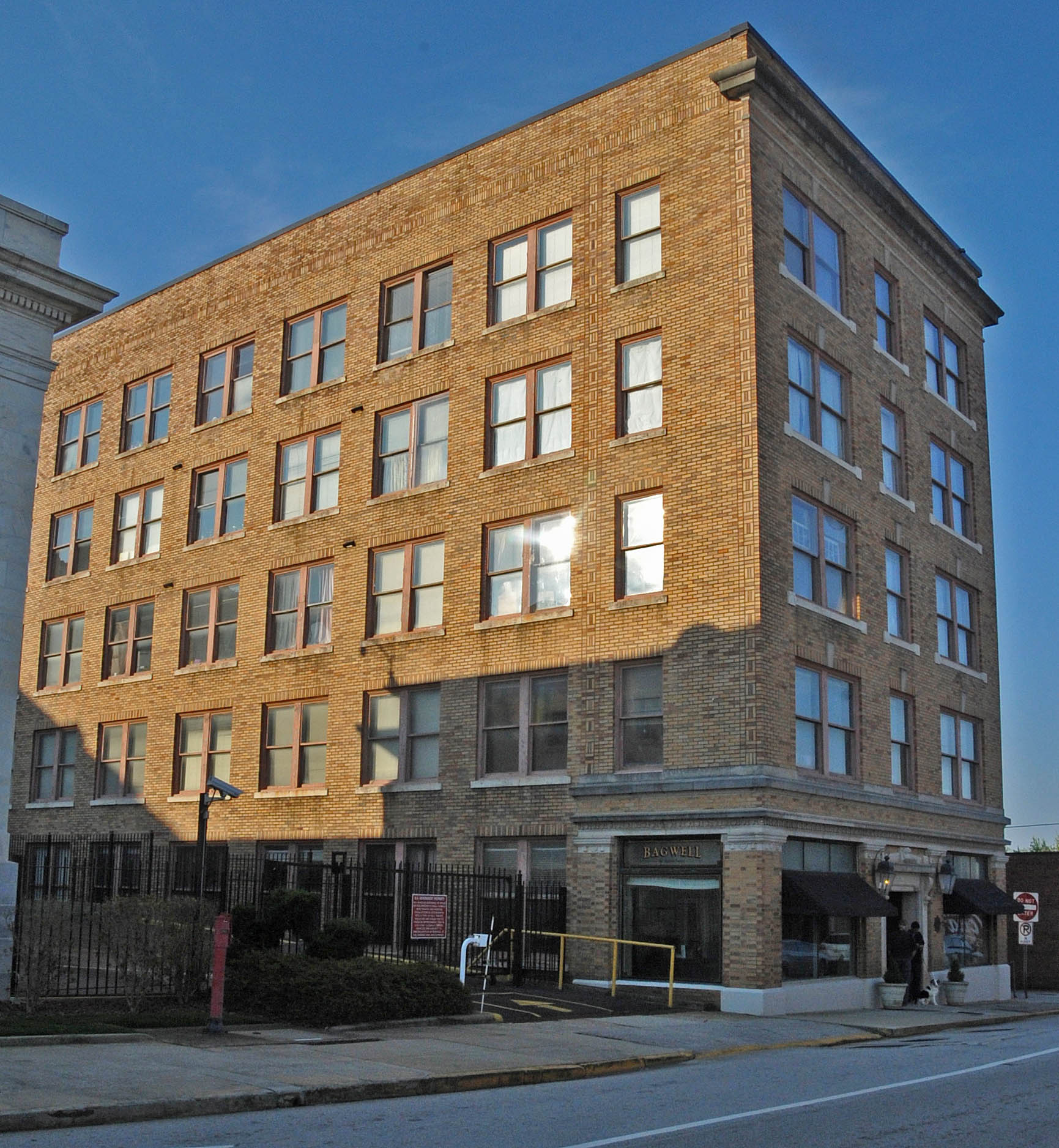
- The building in 2007

- Location within Georgia
- Location: 112 Washington Street NE, Gainesville, Georgia
- Coordinates: 34°17′58″N 83°49′35″W
- Area: 0.1 acres (0.040 ha)
- Built: 1915
- Built by: Levi Prater
- Architect: S.D. Trowbridge
- Architectural style: Classical Revival
- NRHP reference No.: 85001677
- Added to NRHP: August 1, 1985

The Jackson Building is a historic building in Gainesville, Georgia. It was built in 1915 by Levi Prater for Felix Jackson, a businessman who also invested in railroads and steamships in Texas and Philadelphia. It was the tallest building in Gainesville upon its completion. It was designed in the Classical Revival style by S.D. Trowbridge. It has been listed on the National Register of Historic Places since August 1, 1985.
