= KLGC =

KLGC may refer to:

- LaGrange Callaway Airport (ICAO code KLGC)
- KLGC-LD, a low-power television station (channel 25) licensed to serve Alexandria, Louisiana, United States
