= Troup County High School =

School in LaGrange, Georgia, United States

Location
- 1920 Hamilton Road; LaGrange, Georgia; United States; 33°00′03″N 85°00′59″W

Information
- Type: Public
- Established: 1956
- School district: Troup County School District
- Principal: Chetson Stewart
- Teaching staff: 74.00 (FTE)
- Grades: 9-12
- Enrollment: 1,344 (2023-2024)
- Student to teacher ratio: 18.16
- Colors: Navy and Yellow Gold
- Mascot: Tiger
- Website: https://trouphigh.troup.org/

Troup County High School, originally called Troup County Comprehensive High School, is a public college-preparatory and tech-preparatory school located in LaGrange, Georgia, United States. It is a member of the Troup County Board of Education. Troup High School teaches grades 9–12.

== History ==
THS is a public high school, primarily serving the rural portions of western and southwestern Troup County. Center and Rosemont High Schools closed to form Troup High in 1956. The present facility was built in 1986.

Troup High meets accreditation standards for the state of Georgia as well as the Southern Association of Colleges and Schools. Students are enrolled in one of eight programs of study. Troup High serves 1,300 students, 98% of whom are in attendance each day.

== Athletics ==
In addition to the many teams available for student athletes, Troup High has an athletic complex with men's and women's locker areas and a newly equipped weight room for use by all athletes. Some Troup High graduates who have entered the professional athletic field give donations for the upkeep of said facilities.

The Tiger Den gymnasium provides students with a large gym for practice and competition. Inside the gym are practice areas for volleyball, cheerleading, basketball, and wrestling.

Troup High School won football Region Championships in 1972, 1986, 1987 and 2022. Troup High has produced many football standouts such as Mike Hart, Carl Whitfield, Tommy Cox, Tony Cox, Chris Burnette, Dino Stafford, Gary King, George Brewer and Charlie Flowers. Flowers returned to coach at Troup High years later. Donnie Laney, a former THS football player and detective from the television series "Murder Chose Me," declared that the 1986 team remains the greatest team in the school's history.

Troup High also offers fields for baseball and softball competition, and a practice field for football and soccer. An indoor hitting facility will soon be completed near the baseball/softball fields for use by the softball and baseball teams.

Troup High School's wrestling team won nine state championships under the tutelage of Coach Dariel Daniel and finished Runner-up Ten times as well as, finishing third four times. Troup wrestling has also produced eight USA Wrestling High School All-Americans. Coach Daniel left after the 2002 season and started coaching and teaching in Allen, Texas. He moved back to LaGrange after his retirement. Daniel died on November 19, 2013.

Troup High's football and soccer teams play at Callaway Stadium.

== Fine arts ==
The Troup High Tiger Marching Band has been locally recognized many times. The marching band performs at all home and away football games, as well as the LaGrange and West Point Christmas Parades.

Troup High is locally noted for the productions of its theater department. The usual theater season contains three shows, one of which is a musical. Actor Elijah Kelley is a product of the direction of the THS Drama Department.

The choral department usually also gives three concerts, with the main attraction being the Spring Show.

All of these groups perform in the Fine Arts Auditorium, constructed in 2002, which can seat about 900. The local SPLOST funded this building.

== Notable alumni ==
- Lonnie Bartley, head coach of the Fort Valley State University women's basketball team
- Ryan Bliss, professional baseball player
- Cory Grissom, professional football player
- Jimmy Haynes, former professional baseball player (Baltimore Orioles, Oakland Athletics, Milwaukee Brewers, Cincinnati Reds)
- Steve Herndon, former professional football player (Denver Broncos, Atlanta Falcons)
- Kobe Hudson, college football wide receiver
- Elijah Kelley, actor
- David Kelton, former professional baseball player (Chicago Cubs)
- Bubba Sparxxx, hip hop recording artist
- Jamari Thrash, college football wide receiver for the Louisville Cardinals
