= Cory Grissom =

American football player (born 1990)

No. 94, 99
- Position: Defensive end

Personal information
- Born: June 9, 1990 (age 36); LaGrange, Georgia, U.S.
- Listed height: 6 ft 1 in (1.85 m)
- Listed weight: 316 lb (143 kg)

Career information
- High school: LaGrange (GA) Troup County
- College: South Florida
- NFL draft: 2013: undrafted

Career history
- New England Patriots (2013); Kansas City Chiefs (2014)*; Miami Dolphins (2014)*; Nebraska Danger (2015–2016); Green Bay Blizzard (2016–2018)
- * Offseason or practice squad member only

Awards and highlights
- Second-team All-Big East (2012)
- Stats at Pro Football Reference

Ticory Grissom (born June 9, 1990) is an American former football defensive end who played for the Green Bay Blizzard and Nebraska Danger of the Indoor Football League (IFL). He played college football for the University of South Florida. He was originally signed as an undrafted free agent by the New England Patriots of the National Football League (NFL).

== Early career ==
Grissom attended Troup County High School in LaGrange, Georgia where he lettered three times in football and twice in wrestling. In football he was the teams best defensive lineman in 2007 as a senior, as well as all-region, when he recorded 13 sacks, along with five force fumbles and two recoveries. He was also rated the 64th best defensive tackle nationally by Rivals.com and 66th by Scout.com.

He then played for the South Florida Bulls as a defensive tackle. As a freshman in 2008, he appeared in one game. Against Florida International (FIU), he recorded two tackles before being sidelined by an ankle injury. In 2009, he appeared in eight games, with three starts at defensive tackle. For the season, he recorded 11 tackles. For 2010, he started all 13 games, recording 16 tackles, one sack, three tackles-for-loss and a pass breakup. In 2011, Grissom started all 12 games at defensive tackle, recording 38 tackles, 1.5 sacks, six tackles-for-loss, two quarterback pressures, one forced fumble and one fumble recovery. During his final season in 2012, he started all 12 games at defensive tackle, recording 38 tackles, 2.5 sacks, seven tackles-for-loss, and two pass breakups. At the end of the season, he was named All-Conference.

=== Career statistics ===
Year	Team	Games		Tackles				Fumbles				Interceptions					
Year	Team	GP	GS	Cmb	Solo	Ast	Sck	FF	FR	Yds	TD	Int	Yds	Avg	Lng	TD	PD
2008	USF	1	0	2	1	1	0.0	0	0	0	0	0	0	0.0	0	0	0
2009	USF	8	3	11	2	9	0.0	0	0	0	0	0	0	0.0	0	0	0
2010	USF	13	13	16	9	7	1.0	0	0	0	0	0	0	0.0	0	0	1
2011	USF	12	12	38	17	21	1.5	1	1	0	0	0	0	0.0	0	0	0
2012	USF	12	12	38	24	14	2.5	0	0	0	0	0	0	0.0	0	0	2
Career		46	40	105	53	52	5.0	1	1	--	0	0	0	0.0	0	0	3

== Professional career ==
Pre-draft measurables
Height	Weight	40-yard dash	20-yard shuttle	Three-cone drill	Vertical jump	Broad jump	Bench press
6 ft 0 in (1.83 m)	306 lb (139 kg)	5.31 s	4.81 s	7.79 s	27.5 in (0.70 m)	8 ft 0 in (2.44 m)	22 reps

=== New England Patriots ===
On May 3, 2013, Grissom signed with the New England Patriots as an undrafted free agent. On August 26, 2013, he was placed on the injured reserve list and missed the rest of the 2013 season. He was released on March 12, 2014. On March 19, 2014, he signed a one-year contract with the Kansas City Chiefs.

=== Miami Dolphins ===
On August 25, 2014, Grissom was signed by the Miami Dolphins. Despite sources stating that he was released the next day, Grissom disagrees with the statement that he was there for two days.

=== Nebraska Danger ===
On June 4, 2015, Grissom signed with the Nebraska Danger of the Indoor Football League (IFL).

=== Green Bay Blizzard ===
In April 2016, Grissom was traded to the Green Bay Blizzard. Grissom re-signed with the Blizzard on January 30, 2017. On October 10, 2017, Grissom re-signed with the Blizzard.

In his final season with the Green Bay Blizzard, Grissom was named second team All-IFL.

Following the 2018 season, Grissom announced his retirement from Indoor Football via Facebook.
