= Canter Brown Jr. =

American historian

Canter Brown Jr. is an American historian, professor and author. He was born in Fort Meade, Florida. He graduates from Fort Meade Middle-High School. He earned degrees at Florida State University. He has taught at Florida A&M University and has worked at Fort Valley State University in Fort Valley, Georgia. He wrote a book about Florida's African American public officials from 1867 until 1924.

Brown has written on Florida and southern United States history, including Florida's Peace River Frontier, earning him the Florida Historical Society's Rembert W. Patrick Award, and Ossian Bingley Hart: Florida's Loyalist Reconstruction Governor, winner of the Certificate of Commendation of the American Association of State and Local History, about Ossian B. Hart, one of Florida's Reconstruction era governors.

He wrote Florida's Black Public Officials, 1867-1924 documenting the many early black political leaders in Florida especially during the Reconstruction era.

== Bibliography ==
- The Supreme Court of Florida, 1917-1972 (2007) co-authored with Walter Manley
- None Could Have Richer Memories: Polk County Since 1940 (Tampa, 2004)
- In the Midst of All That Makes Life Worth Living: Polk County to 1940 (Tallahassee, 2001)
- Laborers in the Vineyard of the Lord: The Beginnings of the AME Church in Florida, 1865-1895 (Gainesville, 2001) with Larry E. Rivers.
- Cracker Times and Pioneer Lives: The Florida Reminiscences of George Gillett Keen and Sarah Pamela Williams (Columbia, 2000) with James M. Denham
- The Supreme Court of Florida and Its Predecessor Courts, 1821-1917 (1998) co-authored with Walter Manley
- Florida's Black Public Officials, 1867-1924, Tuscaloosa (1998)
- Ossian Bingley Hart: Florida's Loyalist Reconstruction Governor, Baton Rouge (1997)
- Fort Meade, 1849-1900 (Tuscaloosa, 1995)
- Florida's Peace River Frontier, Orlando (1991)
- Mary Edwards Bryan : Her Early Life and Works by Canter Brown Jr. and Larry Eugene Rivers
- Henry Bradley Plant: Gilded Age Dreams for Florida and a New South by Canter Brown Jr.
- Tampa in Civil War and Reconstruction by Brown, Canter, Jr.
