= Lynching of Austin Callaway =

1940 lynching in LaGrange, Georgia, US

Austin Callaway,, also known as Austin Brown (died 9 September 1940), was a young African-American man who was taken from jail by a group of six white men and lynched on September 8, 1940, in LaGrange, Georgia. The day before, Callaway had been arrested as a suspect in the attempted rape of a white woman. The gang carried out extrajudicial punishment and prevented the youth from ever receiving a trial. They shot him numerous times, fatally wounding him and leaving him for dead. Found by a motorist, Callaway was taken to a hospital, where he died of his wounds.

== Events ==
A white woman in LaGrange, Georgia, the county seat of Troup County, complained to local police that she had been attacked by a young black man. Austin Callaway was arrested as a suspect. Sources disagree as to his age, reporting him as age 16, 18, or 24.

Callaway was held in the city jail, then located in the basement of the city hall. Early Sunday morning about 2 a.m., a gang of six white men, who may have been masked and were armed with at least one gun, broke into the jail. They ordered S.J. Willis at gunpoint, the 20-year-old jailer and sole law enforcement officer there, to open Callaway's cell. The white men forced Callaway into their vehicle, taking him outside the town. They shot him several times and left him for dead. That day Callaway was found alive, but suffering multiple gunshot wounds in his head, hands, and arms. He was taken to a hospital, where he died that day.

Although newspapers reported the police chief and county sheriff saying they were investigating the shooting, no such report has been found. Neither the county nor state police investigated the crime. The FBI did not investigate such cases at the time. The LaGrange Daily News ran one article about his death from gun wounds, referring to unknown shooters and avoiding the use of the word "lynching." But Callaway's lynching was reported as such in several major newspapers: the New York Times, Baltimore Sun, Carolina Times, Philadelphia Tribune, and Pittsburgh Courier.

Rev. Louie Strickland, pastor of Warren Temple Methodist Church, wrote to the NAACP, appealing to Thurgood Marshall, then lead attorney at the national headquarters of the NAACP, concluding, "They (white leaders) have settled the matter by ignoring it." Strickland helped charter the first branch of the NAACP in Troup County in October 1940, shortly after Callaway's lynching. The national NAACP publicized Callaway's case to support their drive for anti-lynching legislation that year, citing his death in a September 1940 letter to Senate Majority Leader Alben Barkley (D-Kentucky) appealing for support. In LaGrange, the African-American community in LaGrange kept Callaway's story alive.

The Georgia Commission on Interracial Cooperation conducted an inquiry at the time and raised questions about the role of the police and the press. Why was Callaway virtually unguarded? Why did the police fail to sound an alarm as soon as he was taken? Why did the press hold the story until Monday?

=== Tracking of lynchings ===
At the time, the NAACP and supporters were trying again to gain passage of federal anti-lynching legislation, which was consistently opposed by the white Democratic block of the Solid South in the Senate. (Blacks in the South had been overwhelmingly disenfranchised since the turn of the century and shut out of voting.) The NAACP believed that the nature of lynching had changed; faced with greater social disapproval, vigilantes were taking lynching "underground," murdering victims in secret with smaller groups of men. This was unlike the frenzied mobs of hundreds or thousands who were photographed at lynchings earlier in the century.

Because of discussions of Callaway's and similar cases, the NAACP in 1940 broadened its definition of lynching to include small groups of vigilantes. At the time, the Tuskegee Institute and the Association of Southern Women for the Prevention of Lynching (ASWPL) were also tracking lynchings, and the organizations had not reached consensus on how to define such acts, although they were each working to end racial violence.

As an example of their disagreement, the ASWPL said there were no lynchings in the year from May 1939 to May 1940. They were counting only large mob actions against blacks. But the NAACP strongly disagreed. It noted that three whites had been lynched in March 1940 near Atlanta: a couple was beat to death for "immorality" after being pulled from their car in a Lovers' Lane, and a few days later, a white man was fatally beaten for excessive drinking; these deaths were attributed to KKK members in the April issue of The Nation. In October 1940, the NAACP reported that Callaway's fatal shooting was the sixth lynching verified to have taken place that year in the US. Two black men had been lynched in June 1940, one in Brownsville, Tennessee, in an effort to suppress organizing of African-American voters to register; and another in Luverne, Alabama, who was a suspect in an assault. The anti-lynching groups never gained passage of federal legislation against it.

The peak of lynchings in the South and nationally took place during several years at the turn of the 20th century. The Tuskegee Institute was one of the first institutions to record the lynchings in total. In the 21st century, the Equal Justice Initiative in Montgomery, Alabama compiled a new report on lynchings from 1877 to 1950, identifying additional incidents. In its supplement of Lynchings by County, it notes that Troup County had three lynchings during this period, including Callaway's. Some other counties in Georgia had much higher rates of lynchings. Georgia had the second-highest number of lynchings of any state in the South, which ranked higher than all other states.

=== 21st century acknowledgement ===
In the early 21st century, two people from a church discussion group studying lynching came across the case of Callaway. They started to conduct more research and founded a group, Troup Together, devoted to racial reconciliation. Troup Together published their report Erasing Austin Callaway in 2017. The report noted that press coverage of the lynching was unreliable in providing facts of Callaway's life and death. Details such as Callaway's age were never verified by the press. Some stories put his age at 16. Others said 18. The Troup Together report concluded from Callaway's death certificate and family history that he was likely 24 years old at the time of his lynching. The sole source for all news articles about Callaway in 1940 was LaGrange Police Chief J.E. Matthews, head of the department that failed to protect the young man.

Callaway's case has been the subject of historic studies of lynching in that period. The NAACP noted that it and some other lynchings of that era had changed character: rather than being mass crowd affairs, they were being conducted more secretly by gangs or small groups of men. The use of arms in the abduction of a suspect from jail before he could be tried, and his fatal shooting qualified it as a lynching. Students and professors of the Civil Rights and Restorative Justice Project at Northeastern University in Boston, Massachusetts, have also conducted major research on the lynching of Austin Callaway.

Louis M. Dekmar, the current City Police Chief, is not a native of LaGrange and learned of Callaway's lynching a couple of years ago. On January 27, 2017, he and the mayor, together with other top officials, spoke to more than 200 attendees at a reconciliation service at Warren Temple United Methodist Church. Dekmar apologized for the police having failed to protect Callaway decades ago, and said he hoped to "interrupt the past."

"I sincerely regret and denounce the role our Police Department played in Austin's lynching, both through our action and our inaction," Chief Dekmar told a crowd at a traditionally African-American church. "And for that, I'm profoundly sorry. It should never have happened."

The mayor also apologized for the failure of city officials in 1940 to protect Callaway and prevent the lynching. In an editorial on January 28, 2017, editor Jennifer Shrader of the LaGrange Daily News acknowledged the paper's role in minimizing coverage of the story in 1940. It did not report his death as the result of a lynching.

After Callaway's lynching, coverage of his death by this newspaper was on page six. To the best of our knowledge there was no further investigative coverage or follow up of any kind by the LaGrange Daily News. The New York Times and other national media appear to have done a better job of reporting Callaway's death than his hometown newspaper.

She committed the newspaper to being fair in its coverage in the future.

== Legacy and honors ==
- Callaway was commemorated in January 2017 at a reconciliation service at Warren Temple United Methodist Church, at which the chief of the LaGrange Police Department apologized to the descendants and family of Callaway for the department's role in the murder.
- This church was the site of a lynching memorial to Callaway installed in March 2017 by the City of LaGrange and the Equal Justice Initiative.
