= Trey Wolfe =

American football player (born 1988)

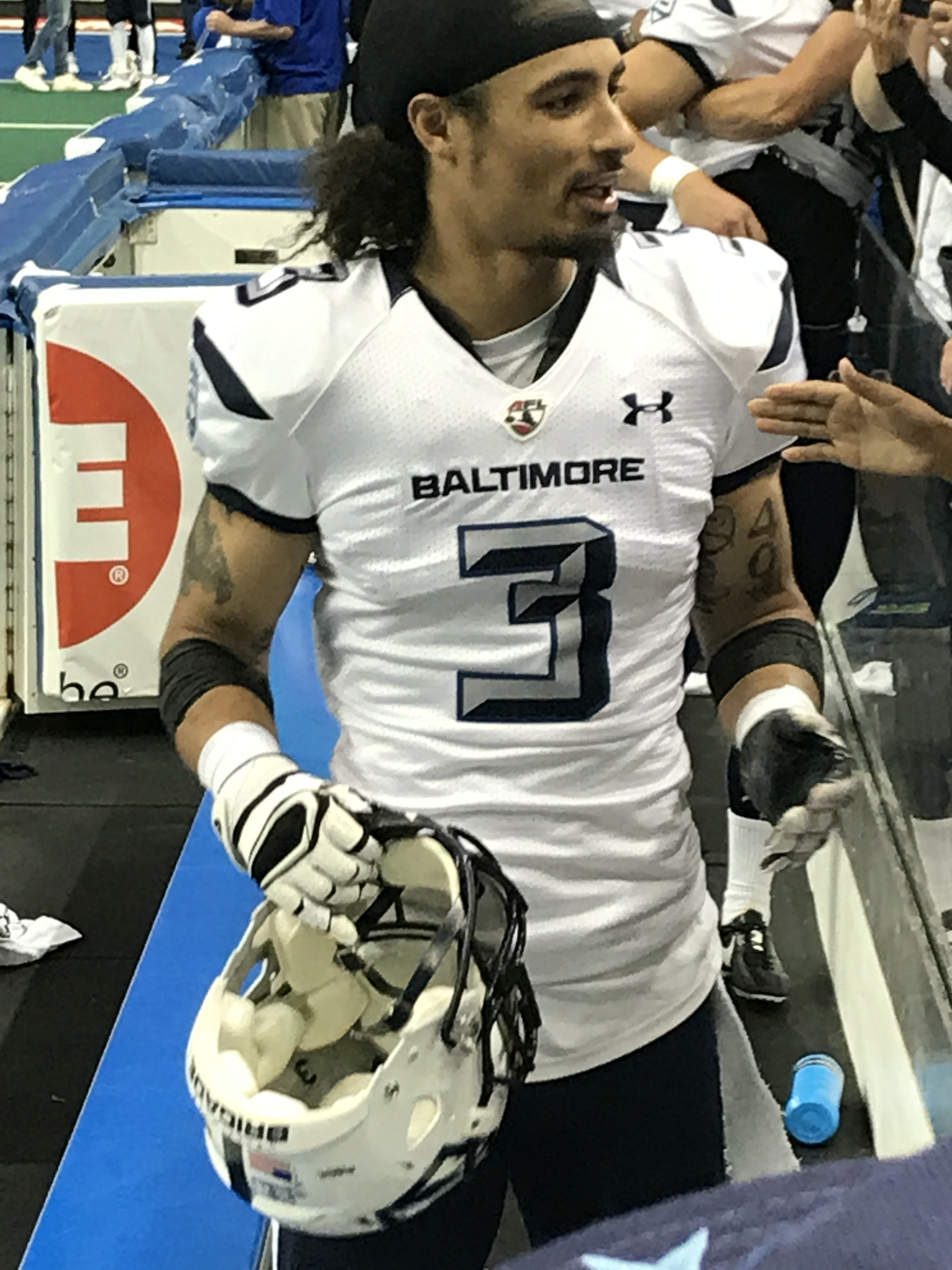
- Wolfe in 2017

No. 23, 3
- Position: Defensive back

Personal information
- Born: October 24, 1988 (age 38); Atlanta, Georgia, U.S.
- Listed height: 6 ft 0 in (1.83 m)
- Listed weight: 180 lb (82 kg)

Career information
- High school: Marietta (GA) Wheeler
- College: Fort Valley State
- NFL draft: 2014: undrafted

Career history
- Seattle Seahawks (2014)*; Washington Redskins (2014–2015)*; Hamilton Tiger-Cats (2016)*; Los Angeles KISS (2016); Tampa Bay Storm (2017)*; Baltimore Brigade (2017); Washington Valor (2019)
- * Offseason or practice squad member only

Awards and highlights
- HBCU All-American (2013); First-team All-SIAC (2013)

Career AFL statistics
- Total tackles: 33.5
- Pass deflections: 3
- Stats at ArenaFan.com
- Stats at Pro Football Reference

Thomas Wolfe III (born October 24, 1988) is an American former football defensive back. He played college football at Fort Valley State University and attended Joseph Wheeler High School in Marietta, Georgia.

== Early life ==
Wolfe attended Joseph Wheeler High School where he starred football, basketball, and baseball.

== College career ==
Wolfe played for the Reedley Tigers from 2007 to 2009. Wolfe transferred to Midwestern State played in 2010 with the Mustangs before he tore his Achilles tendon. Wolfe played for the Fort Valley State Wildcats in 2013. He played in 12 games during his career including 9 starts at cornerback. Wolfe was named a First-team All-Southern Intercollegiate Athletic Conference selection and HBCU All-American following the 2013 season.

== Professional career ==
=== Seattle Seahawks ===
Wolfe signed with the Seattle Seahawks as an undrafted free agent. Wolfe was waived on August 6, 2014. Wolfe was re-signed on August 10, 2014 and waived again on August 25.

=== Washington Redskins ===
Wolfe was signed to the Washington Redskins practice squad on November 26, 2014. He was waived on May 4, 2015. Wolfe was re-signed by the Redskins on May 28, 2015.

=== Hamilton Tiger-Cats ===
Wolfe was signed by the Hamilton Tiger-Cats on May 28, 2016. He was waived on June 20, 2016.

=== Los Angeles KISS ===
On July 7, 2016, Wolfe was assigned to the Los Angeles KISS.

=== Tampa Bay Storm ===
On October 14, 2016, Wolfe was assigned to the Tampa Bay Storm. On January 5, 2017, Wolfe had his rookie option exercised by the Storm.

=== Baltimore Brigade ===
On February 24, 2017, Wolfe was traded to the Baltimore Brigade for claim order positioning and future considerations.

=== Washington Valor ===
On April 2, 2019, Wolfe was assigned to the Washington Valor.
