= Ron Pope =

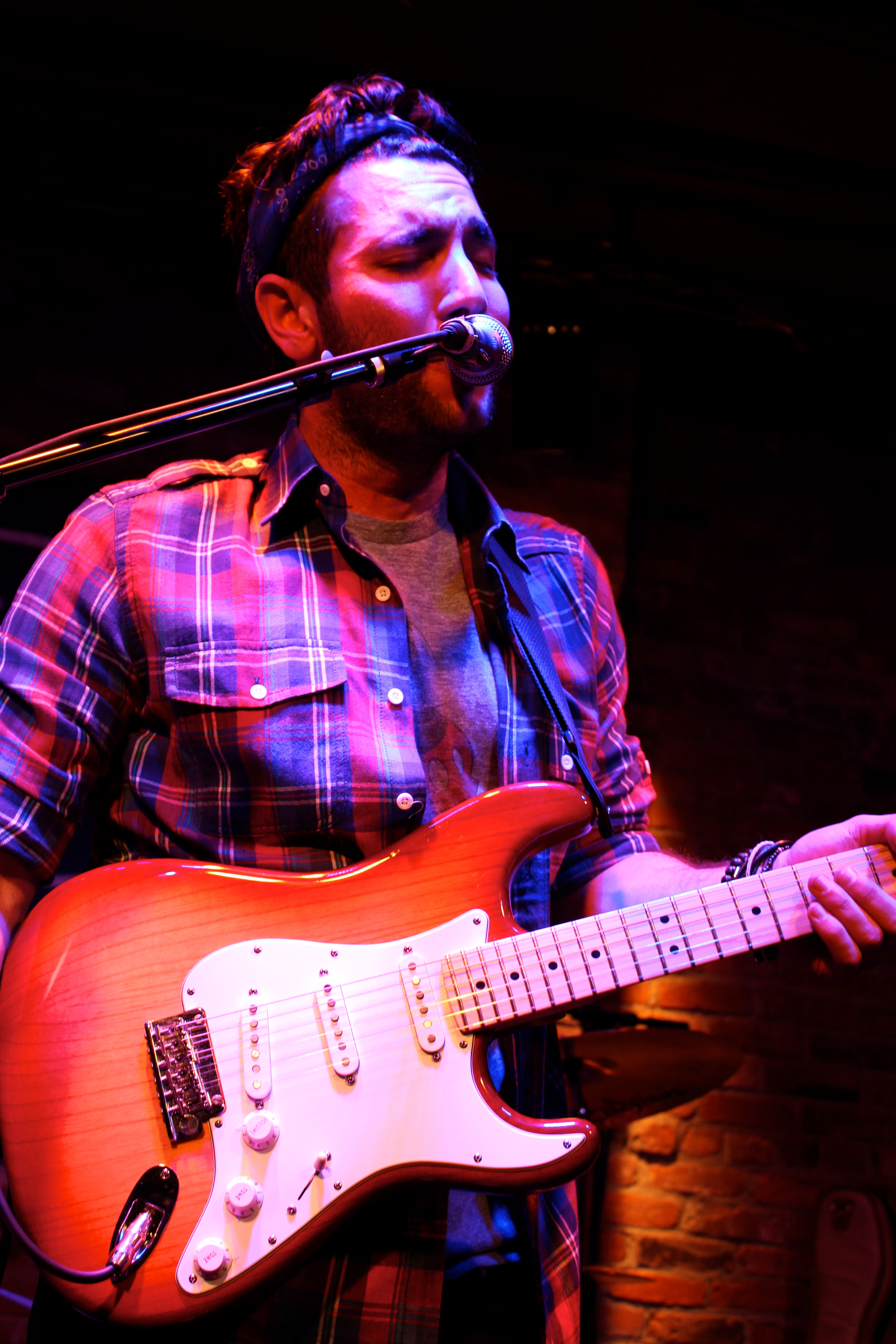
- Ron Pope in New York City

Background information
- Born: July 23, 1983 (age 42); Newark, NJ
- Genres: Americana, Singer-Songwriter, Roots
- Occupations: singer-songwriter, producer
- Years active: 2003–present
- Label: Brooklyn Basement Records
- Spouse: Blair Clark
- Website: www.ronpopemusic.com

Ronald Michael Pope (born July 23, 1983) is an American singer-songwriter. He is currently based in Nashville.

== Background and career ==
Pope was raised in Marietta, Georgia. He attended East Cobb Middle School and Joseph Wheeler High School. He began playing the guitar at an early age.

After high school, he attended Rutgers University for two years to play baseball. After a career-ending injury, he transferred to New York University in 2003 to pursue his interest in music. After joining a songwriting circle with fellow students, he met friends and future bandmates, Zach Berkman and Paul Hammer. In 2007, he co–wrote the internet hit "A Drop in the Ocean" with Zach Berkman From there, they created The District with Chris Kienel, Will Frish and Mike Clifford. Following success as a college band, they toured for two years and recorded three albums: The District, The District Does Christmas, and Last Call. In December 2010, The District reunited to record "Wellfleet"

In March 2008, Pope performed on MTV's TRL as a featured up-and-coming artist. Independently, he wrote, produced, and released four full-length albums: Daylight (2008), The Bedroom Demos (2009), Goodbye, Goodnight (2009) and Hello, Love (2010).

In May 2009, Pope signed a year-long recording contract with record label Universal Republic, with whom he released two singles, "A Drop in the Ocean" and "I Believe". "A Drop in the Ocean" was later certified Platinum by the Recording Industry Association of America (RIAA) for combined sales and streaming equivalent of over 1 million Since leaving the label, he has produced and released his music independently via his own label, Brooklyn Basement Records.

Ron founded the record label, Brooklyn Basement Records, alongside his wife, Blair Clark.

Pope's first release since moving to Nashville was "Work" which Rolling Stone lauded as "a stew of musical ideas and stories sourced from many different points in time, but firmly held together by Pope’s consistent songwriting voice."

On March 6, 2017, he took part in a benefit concert celebrating the music of Aretha Franklin at Carnegie Hall.

== Television placements ==
He has had two songs placed on FOX's So You Think You Can Dance in both Canada and the US. He was featured in the season three premiere of The Vampire Diaries on The CW. "A Drop in the Ocean" was performed on the UK television show Made in Chelsea by the British reality star Caggie Dunlop, and also in the fourth season of 90210. He also guest starred as himself in season 3 episode 17 of Nashville.

== Discography ==
=== Studio albums ===
Title	Details
Daylight	Release: May 18, 2008; Format: CD, LP, digital download; Label: Ron Pope Music
Goodbye, Goodnight	Release: May 12, 2009; Format: CD, digital download; Label: Ron Pope Music
The New England Sessions	Release: June 1, 2010; Format: CD, digital download; Label: Ron Pope Music
Whatever It Takes	Release: March 8, 2011; Format: CD, digital download; Label: Ron Pope Music, The Mason-Dixon Railroad
Atlanta	Release: April 17, 2012; Format: CD, LP, digital download; Label: Hard Six Records
Calling Off The Dogs	Release: January 6, 2014; Format: CD, digital download; Label: Ron Pope Music, Brooklyn Basement Records
Ron Pope and the Nighthawks	Release: January 25, 2016; Format: CD, digital download; Label: Brooklyn Basement Records
Work	Release: August 18, 2017; Format: CD, LP, digital download; Label: Brooklyn Basement Records
Daylight II	Release: March 29, 2019; Format: Digital download; Label: Brooklyn Basement Records
Bone Structure	Release: March 6, 2020; Format: CD, LP, digital download; Label: Brooklyn Basement Records
Inside Voices	Release: June 2, 2023; Format: CD, LP, digital download; Label: Brooklyn Basement Records
American Man, American Music	Release: February 14, 2025; Format: LP, digital download; Label: Brooklyn Basement Records

=== Extended-plays ===
Title	Details
Hello, Love	Release: May 12, 2009; Format: CD, digital download; Label: Ron Pope Music
Born Under a Bad Sign	Release: July 5, 2011; Format: Digital download; Label: Brooklyn Basement Records
Monster	Release: December 18, 2012; Format: Digital download; Label: Brooklyn Basement Records
Nothing	Release: September 9, 2014; Format: Digital download; Label: Self-released
Christmas Where I Come From	Release: December 3, 2020; Format: Digital download; Label: Brooklyn Basement Records
I May Not Always Love You	Release: November 12, 2021; Format: Digital download; Label: Brooklyn Basement Records
A Holly Jolly Ron Pope	Release: December 10, 2021; Format: Digital download; Label: Brooklyn Basement Records
It's Gonna Be A Long Night	Release: April 28, 2022; Format: Digital download; Label: Brooklyn Basement Records
Things Jesus Didn't Say	Release: June 20, 2025; Format: Digital download; Label: Brooklyn Basement Records

=== Demos, live, & series ===
Title	Details
The Bedroom Demos	Release: May 4, 2008; Format: Digital download; Label: Ron Pope Music
Ron Pope Live & Unplugged in New York	Release: September 7, 2010; Format: CD, Digital download; Label: Ron Pope Music
26 Tuesdays, Pt 1	Release: December 20, 2011; Format: Digital download; Label: Brooklyn Basement Records
26 Tuesdays, Pt 2	Release: December 20, 2011; Format: Digital download; Label: Brooklyn Basement Records
The Builder [Streaming Singles Series]	Release: December 31, 2021; Format: Digital download; Label: Brooklyn Basement Records

=== Singles ===
List of singles, showing year released and album name
Title	Year	Certifications	Album
2009	"A Drop in the Ocean"	RIAA: Platinum; BPI: Gold; IFPI DEN: Gold; RMNZ: Platinum	Daylight
2012	"One Grain of Sand"		Atlanta
2014	"Lick My Wounds"		Calling Off The Dogs
2015	"Ain't No Angel"		Ron Pope & the Nighthawks
2015	"Southern Cross"		Ron Pope & the Nighthawks
2017	"Baby, I Love You"		non-album single
2017	"Bad For My Health"		Work
2020	"River"		Christmas Where I Come From
2020	"Turning Back" (feat. Emily Scott Robinson)		The Builder (Volume 1)
2021	"I'll Be Home for Christmas"		non-album singles
2022	"Dreams"		non-album singles
2022	"White Christmas"		non-album singles
2023	"Late Night Talking"		non-album singles
