= LaGrange, Georgia =

City in Georgia, United States

- City and county seat
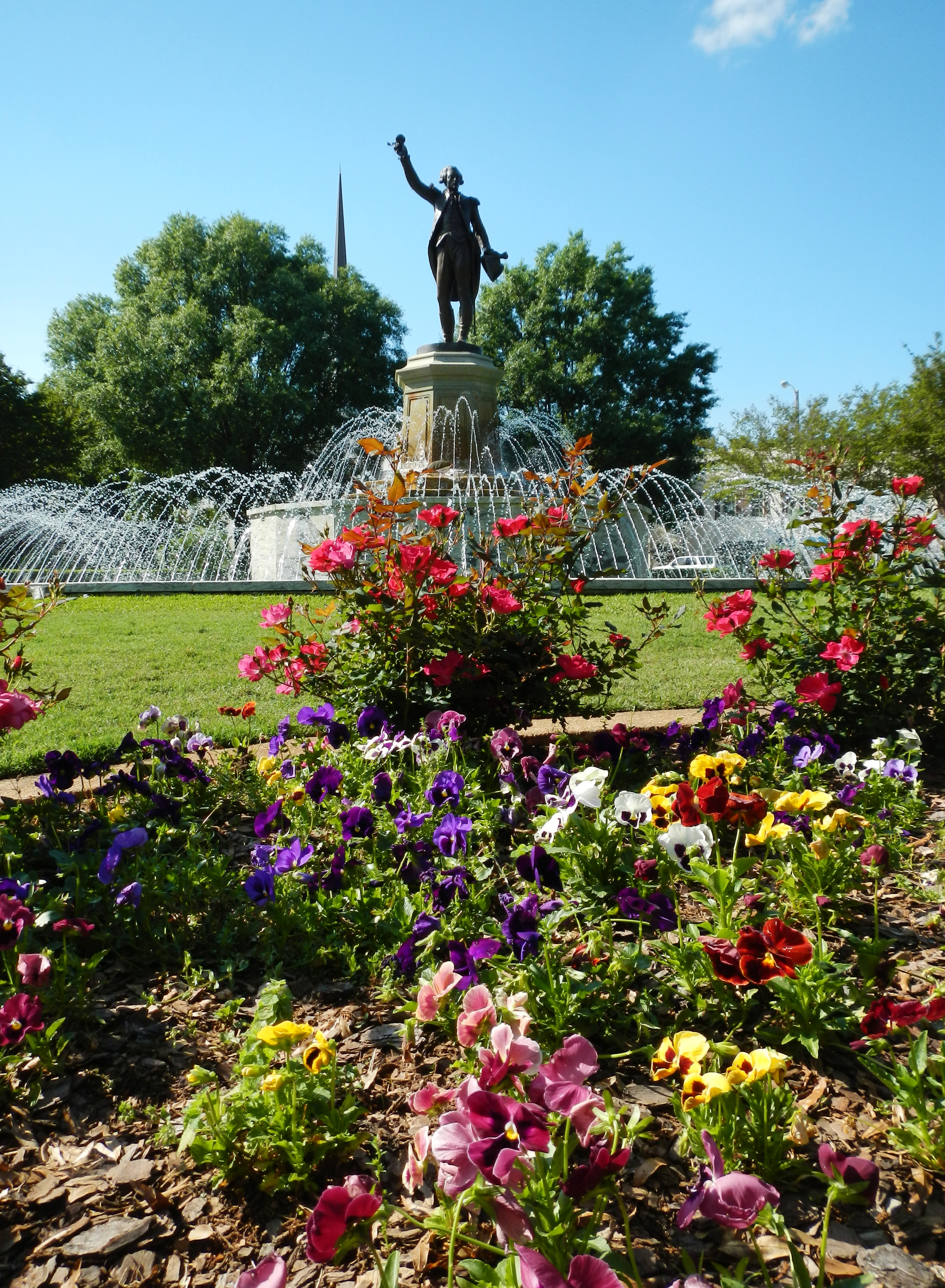
- Courthouse square in LaGrange

- Flag Logo

- Location in Troup County and Georgia
- Coordinates: 33°2′12″N 85°01′55″W
- Country: United States
- State: Georgia
- County: Troup

Government
  - Mayor: Jim Arrington

Area
  - Total: 42.98 sq mi (111.31 km^{2})
  - Land: 42.14 sq mi (109.15 km^{2})
  - Water: 0.83 sq mi (2.16 km^{2})
- Elevation: 781 ft (238 m)

Population (2020)
  - Total: 30,858
  - Density: 732.2/sq mi (282.71/km^{2})
- Time zone: UTC-5 (EST)
  - Summer (DST): UTC-4 (EDT)
- ZIP codes: 30240, 30241, 30261
- Area code: 706
- FIPS code: 13-44340
- GNIS feature ID: 0316522
- Website: lagrangega.gov

LaGrange is a city in and the county seat of Troup County, Georgia, United States. The population of the city was estimated to be 30,858 in 2020 by the U.S. Census Bureau. It is the principal city of the LaGrange, Georgia Micropolitan Statistical Area, which is included in the Atlanta-Sandy Springs-Gainesville, Georgia-Alabama (part) combined statistical area. It is about 60 miles (97 km) southwest of Atlanta and located in the foothills of the Georgian Piedmont.

LaGrange is home to LaGrange College, the oldest private college in the state. Started as a girls' academy, it has been affiliated since the late 19th century with the Methodist Church, and what is now the North Georgia Conference of the United Methodist Church. The city's proximity to West Point Lake, a few miles to the west, helps attract bass fishermen and water sports enthusiasts to the city.

The Troup County Courthouse, Annex, and Jail, built in 1939, is one of LaGrange's properties that is listed on the National Register of Historic Places.

== Etymology ==
LaGrange is named after the country estate near Paris of the wife of the Marquis de La Fayette. When La Fayette, a Revolutionary War hero, visited Georgia in 1825 on a national tour, he remarked on the similarity of local topography to his wife's property.

== History ==
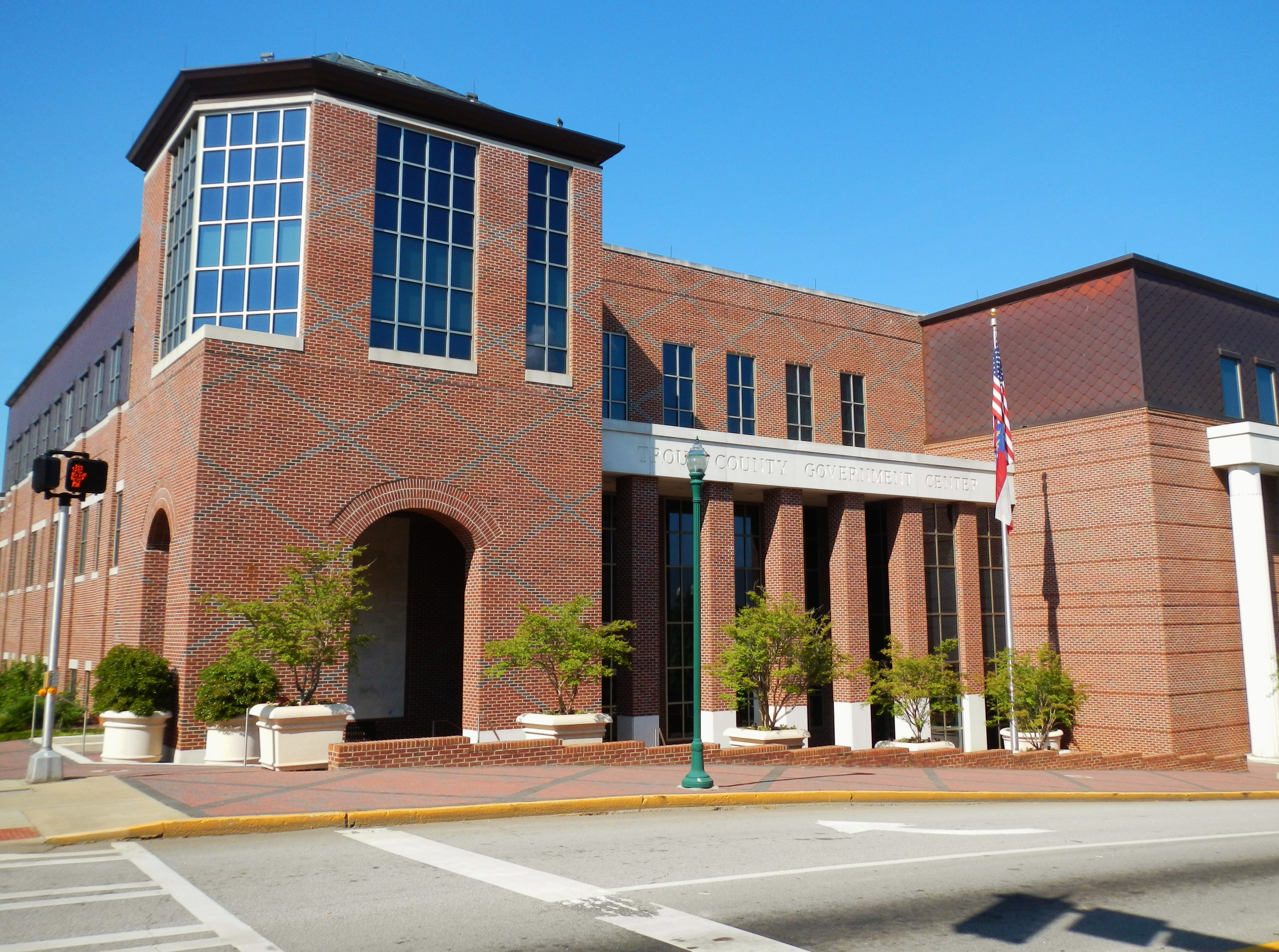
Troup County Government Center in LaGrange

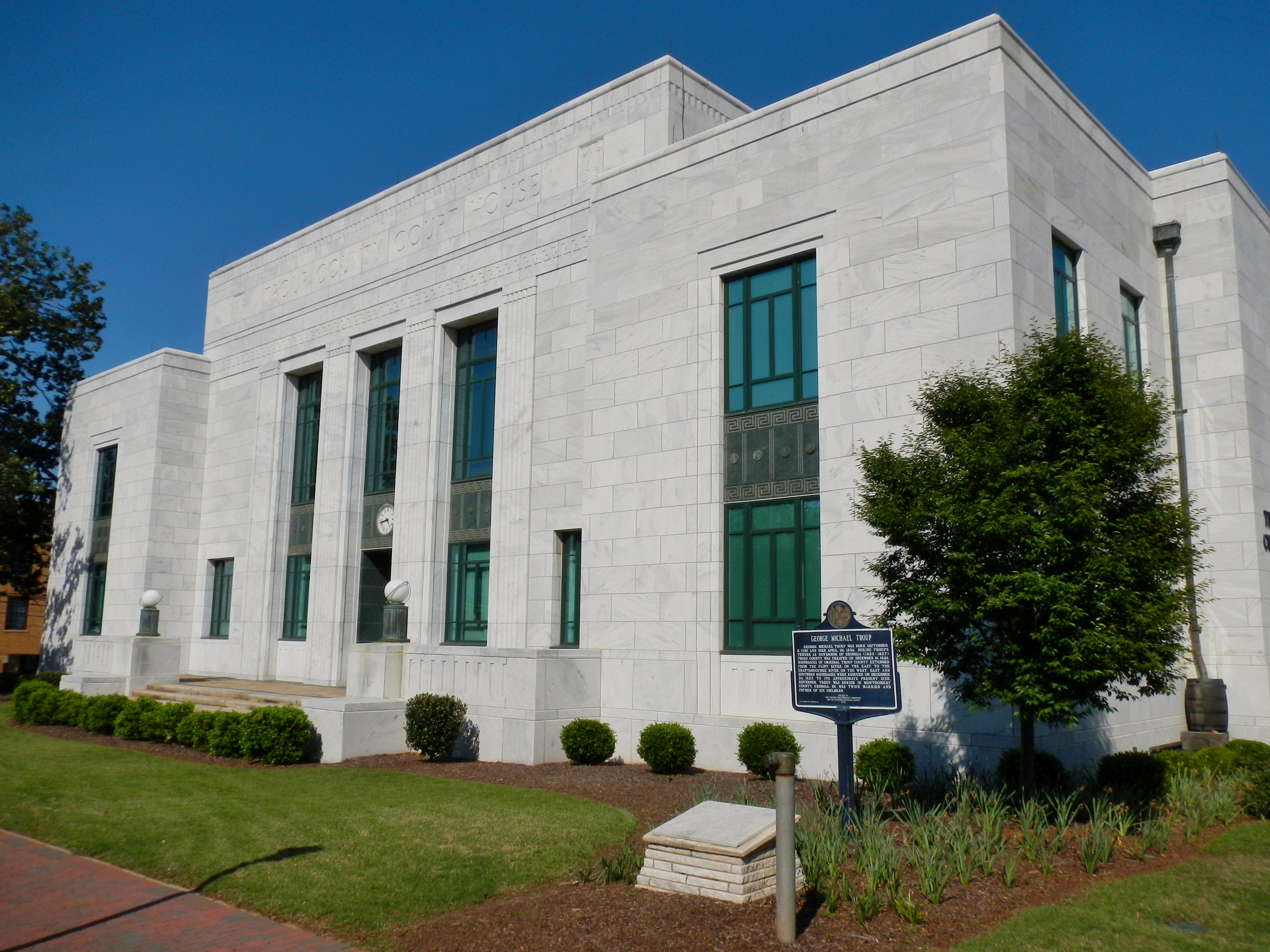
Built in 1939, the old Troup County Courthouse listed on the National Register of Historic Places (HRHP)

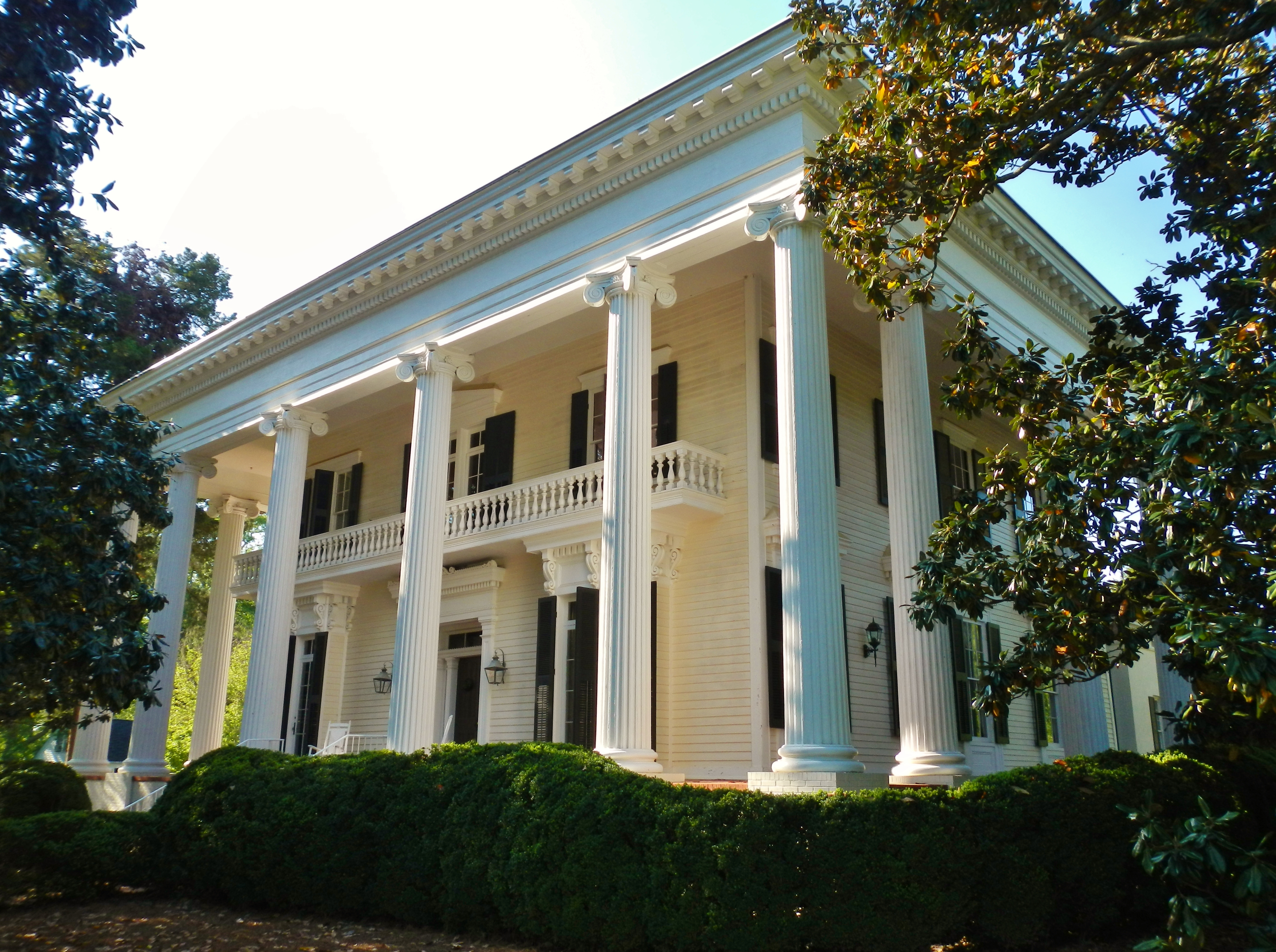
Senator Benjamin Harvey Hill's LaGrange home, Bellevue, was built in 1854–55; it is listed on the HRHP and is a designated National Historic Landmark.

=== 19th century ===
The European-American settlement of LaGrange began in the early 19th century, soon after the territory was ceded to the United States by the Creek Indians and the territorial legislature established Troup County. The city was incorporated in December 1828. The area was developed for cotton plantations, and planters migrating from the eastern areas of the South brought along or bought African American slaves in the domestic slave trade to use as forced laborers.

By 1860 Troup County had become the fourth-wealthiest county in Georgia, based on cotton as a commodity crop. It was the fifth-largest slaveholding county in the state. As the county seat, LaGrange was a center of trade for this prosperous area, and wealthy planters built more than 100 significant homes in the city.

During the American Civil War, LaGrange was defended by a volunteer women's auxiliary group known as the Nancy Harts or Nancy Hart Rifles, named after Nancy Hart. After defeating the Confederates in nearby West Point, Georgia, Colonel Oscar H. La Grange led his U.S. troops to the county seat of LaGrange. He placed Confederate prisoners near the front of the column. The Nancy Harts negotiated a surrender with the colonel.

Although local assets were burned and looted by U.S. troops, Colonel La Grange spared the private homes of LaGrange, including Bellevue, the home of former U.S. Senator and then Confederate senator Benjamin Harvey Hill, a slave owner. La Grange may have been returning positive treatment which he had earlier received while in captivity. He had been given medical care by Confederates and was attended by a niece of Senator Hill. After recovery, Col. La Grange was exchanged for a Confederate prisoner, and he returned to battle duty.

To show their gratitude for his sparing their homes, one of the Nancy Harts hosted a dinner for Col. La Grange. He paroled some local prisoners so they could attend. Many women of the town cooked all night to provide the meal. The next morning the U.S. troops marched out, taking various men of the town as prisoners of war. They were soon released, when it was learned that Robert E. Lee had surrendered at Appomattox.

In the late 19th century, LaGrange developed as a railroad center and as an industrial center. Textile mills were developed here and elsewhere in the upland region. Initially they employed only white workers. They increased in regional, state and national economic importance into the mid-20th century.

=== 20th century to present ===
Gradually in the late 20th century, much textile manufacturing moved offshore, out of the United States.

The city has transitioned to a mixed economy with some new industries. Interstates 85 and 185 pass through LaGrange, which is a transportation hub in the area. The city has industrial and commercial access, and a Wal-Mart Distribution Center was developed here.

Interface, the world's leading manufacturer of carpet tile, was founded in LaGrange in 1973. It has its largest manufacturing center here. LaGrange is also home to a plant for Weiler Forestry.

The city of LaGrange is a full-service utility provider for the region, including electricity, natural gas, water, sewer, refuse collection, and telecommunication. In 2000 the city was named "Intelligent Community of the Year" by the Intelligent Community Forum, joining other cities such as New York, Singapore, Seoul, Glasgow and Toronto. Since 2000 the city has provided free Internet service to every household. It also has been ranked as a Georgia City of Excellence, and received a Government Technology Leadership Award.

LaGrange was in the news in late January 2017 for the public apology of its police chief and mayor for the city's failure in 1940 to protect Austin Callaway, a 16-year-old African-American resident, from being lynched. The police did not report nor investigate his murder very thoroughly.

On November 8, 2021, it was announced that Upstate New York-based firearms manufacturer, Remington Arms, would be moving their global headquarters from Ilion, New York to La Grange, and would be hiring 865 people over the span of five years. Construction is expected to cost $100 million.

The southern half of the city was heavily damaged by an EF2 tornado on January 12, 2023. The tornado injured four people along its path as well.

== Geography ==
According to the U.S. Census Bureau, the city has an area of 112.8 mi (181.5 km), of which 111.4 mi (179.3 km) is land and 1.4 mi (2.3 km) is water.

== Demographics ==
Historical population
Census	Pop.	Note	%±
1850	1,523		—
1870	2,053		—
1880	2,295		11.8%
1890	3,090		34.6%
1900	4,274		38.3%
1910	5,587		30.7%
1920	17,038		205.0%
1930	20,131		18.2%
1940	21,983		9.2%
1950	25,025		13.8%
1960	23,632		−5.6%
1970	23,301		−1.4%
1980	24,204		3.9%
1990	25,597		5.8%
2000	25,998		1.6%
2010	29,588		13.8%
2020	30,858		4.3%
2025 (est.)	34,730	▲	12.5%
U.S. Decennial Census; 2025

=== 2020 census ===
As of the 2020 census, LaGrange had a population of 30,858 and 6,862 families. The median age was 35.0 years. 26.1% of residents were under the age of 18 and 15.6% of residents were 65 years of age or older. For every 100 females there were 87.0 males, and for every 100 females age 18 and over there were 80.4 males age 18 and over.

93.0% of residents lived in urban areas, while 7.0% lived in rural areas.

There were 11,995 households in LaGrange, of which 34.5% had children under the age of 18 living in them. Of all households, 31.0% were married-couple households, 19.9% were households with a male householder and no spouse or partner present, and 42.0% were households with a female householder and no spouse or partner present. About 31.1% of all households were made up of individuals and 12.6% had someone living alone who was 65 years of age or older.

There were 13,077 housing units, of which 8.3% were vacant. The homeowner vacancy rate was 2.1% and the rental vacancy rate was 5.7%.

Racial composition as of the 2020 census
Race	Number	Percent
White	11,306	36.6%
Black or African American	15,751	51.0%
American Indian and Alaska Native	98	0.3%
Asian	1,188	3.8%
Native Hawaiian and Other Pacific Islander	15	0.0%
Some other race	1,252	4.1%
Two or more races	1,248	4.0%
Hispanic or Latino (of any race)	1,868	6.1%

== Government ==
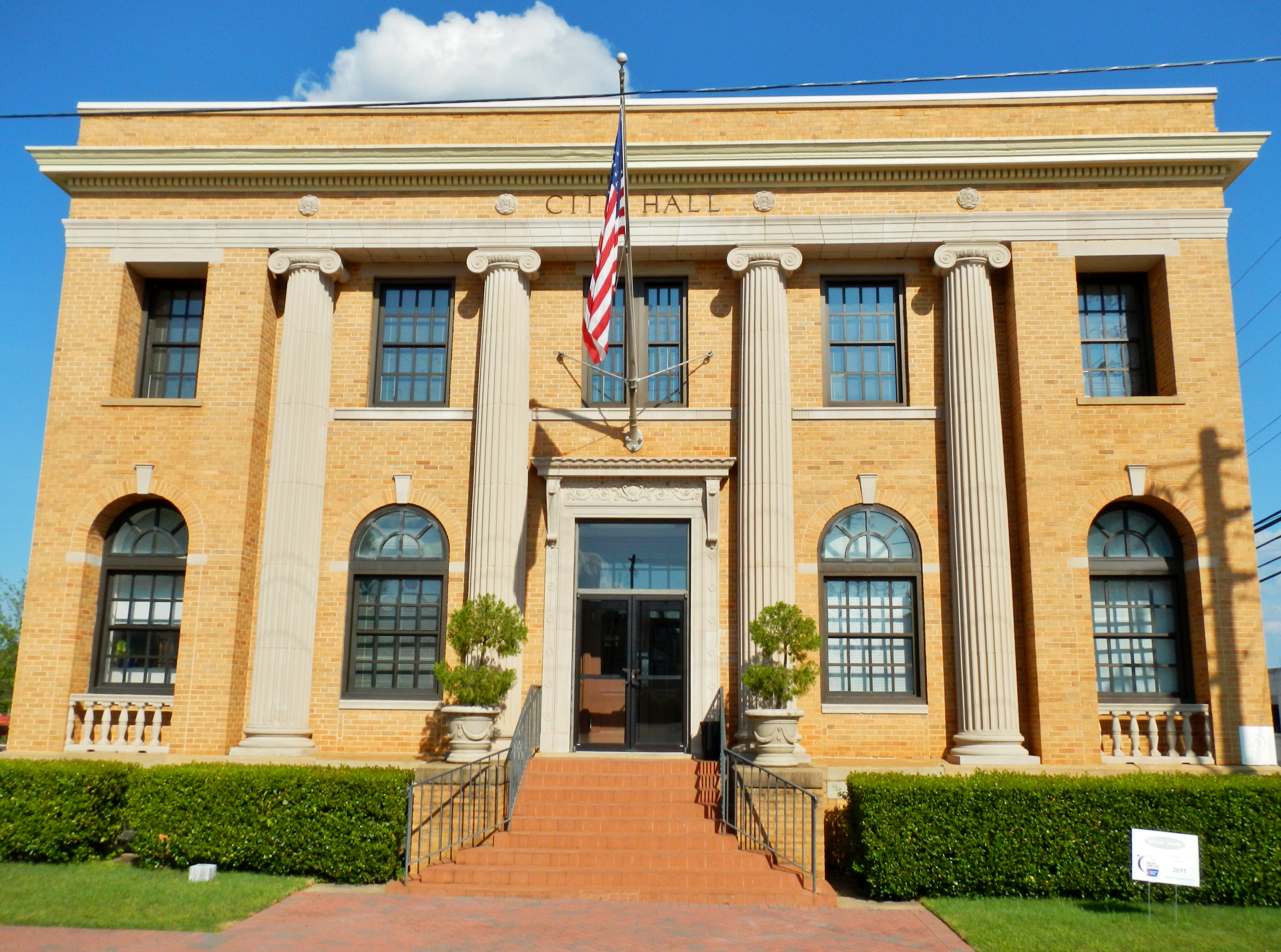
LaGrange City Hall

LaGrange is governed by a mayor and six-person city council. The mayor is elected citywide (at-large). Three council members are elected to one post each from each of two council districts, designated as 1a, 1b, and 1c from the first district, with similar naming for posts in the second district. Candidates must declare for a post in one of the districts at the time of their filing, and must win a majority to be elected. This system was established for the first municipal election in 2011. (This was in compliance with a consent decree and court order settling litigation since 1982 under Section 5 of the Voting Rights Act of 1965.)

Previously a smaller number of city council members were elected at-large; as each candidate had to command a majority of electors, the minority seldom could elect a candidate of their choice. The Department of Justice recorded objections to the city of LaGrange changes to election methods in October 1993 and December 1994. The 1993 objection related to the use of two at-large seats in a mixed city council plan with four single-member districts; the 1994 objection related to the use of one at-large seat in a mixed city council plan with two "super-districts" and four single-member districts. From 1997, more city council seats were established in LaGrange. Municipal elections are held in odd-numbered years.

The current mayor of LaGrange is Jim Arrington. He was elected mayor on May 21, 2024, filling a seat vacated by the death of former mayor Willie T Edmondson, who was the first African-American elected Mayor of LaGrange. The mayor and all council members are elected for four-year terms on a nonpartisan basis. The city council hires a full-time city manager, who oversees daily operations of city departments.

In January 2017, Police Chief Louis M. Dekmar apologized publicly for his department's failure in 1940 to protect a 16-year-old black youth, who was lynched.

== Education ==
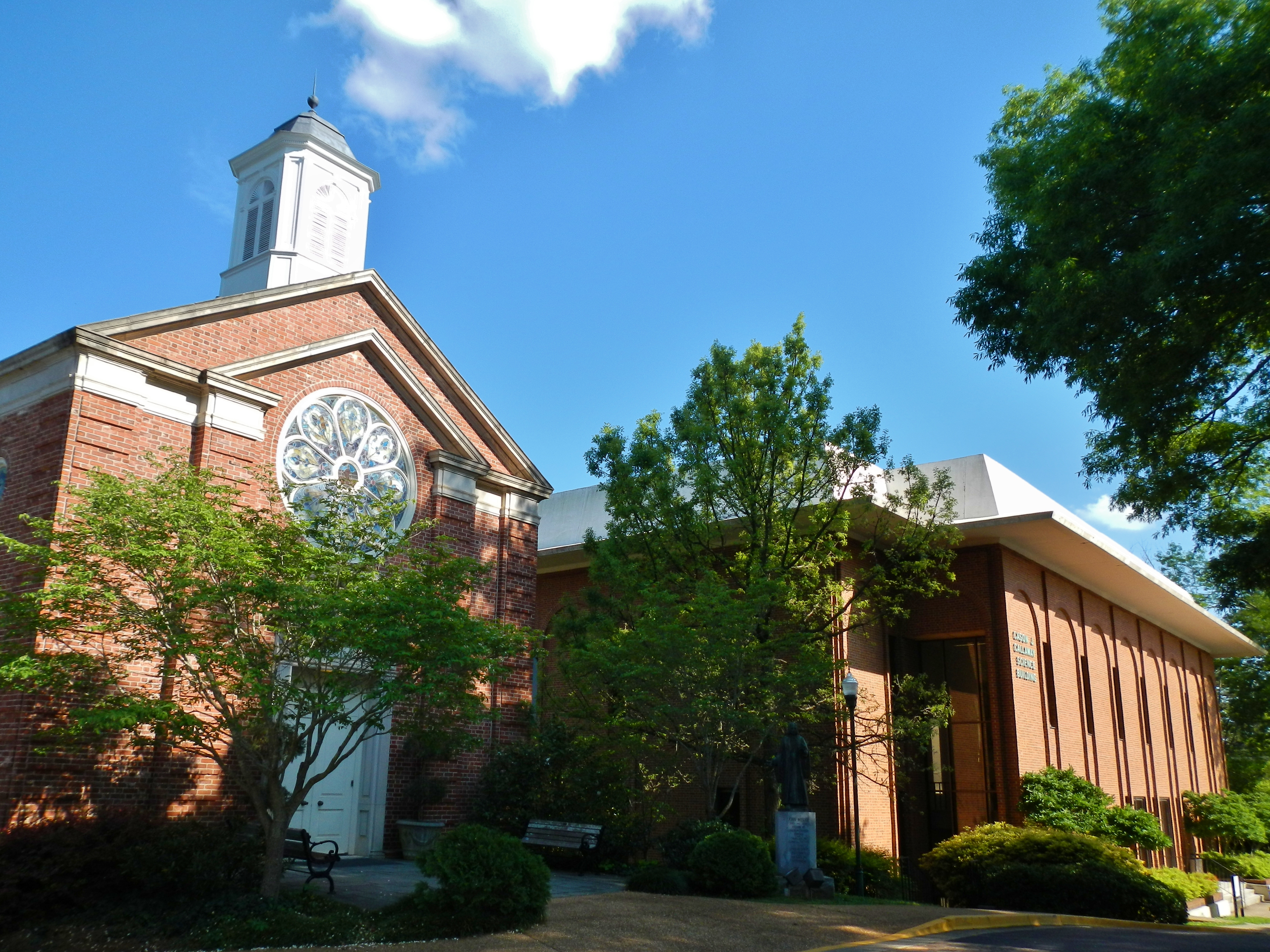
LaGrange College is the oldest private college in Georgia

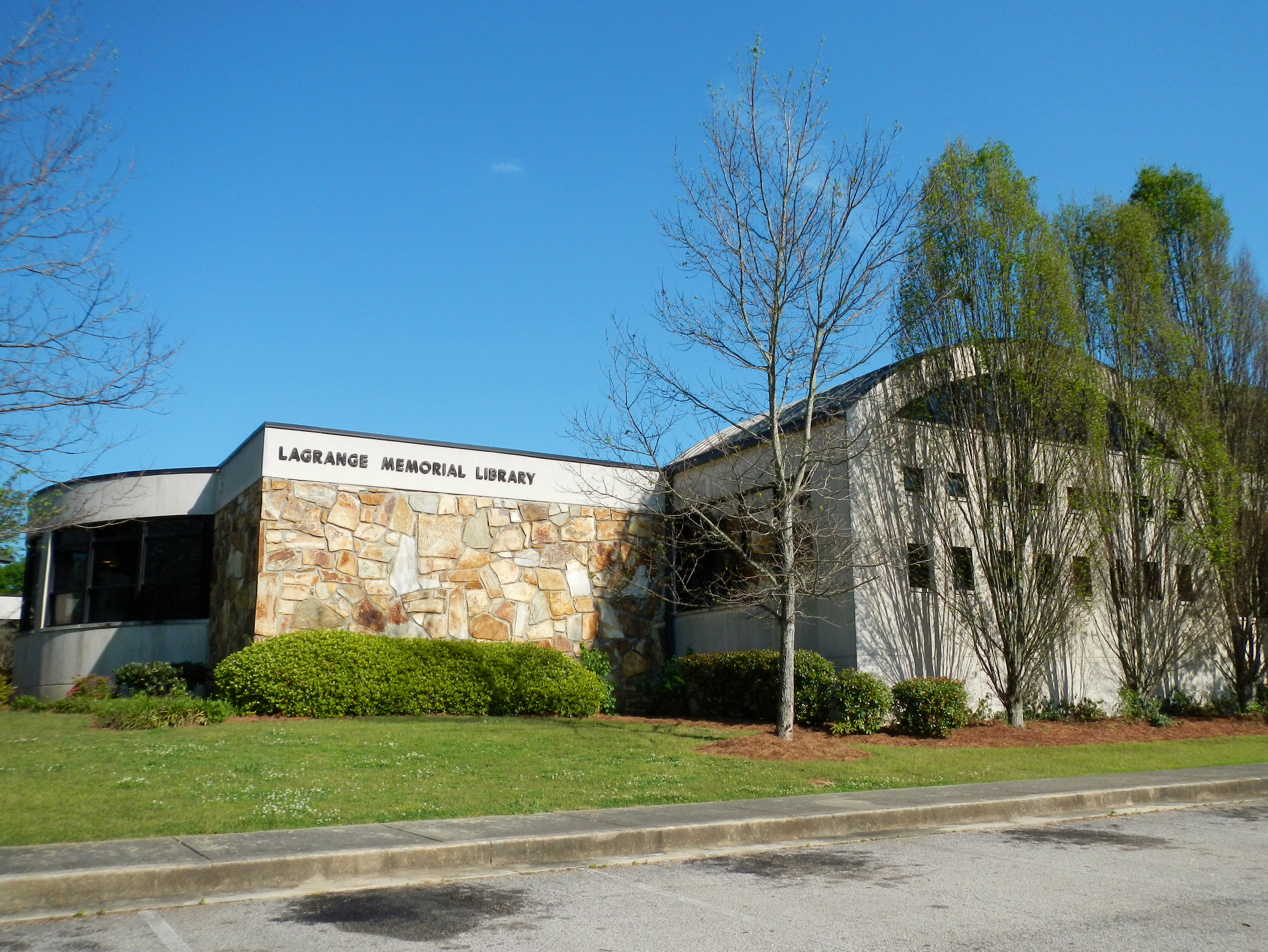
LaGrange Memorial Library

=== Troup County School District ===
The Troup County School System holds pre-school to grade 12, and consists of 11 elementary schools, three middle schools (Callaway Middle School, Gardner Newman Middle School, and Long Cane Middle School), and three high schools (Callaway High School, LaGrange High School, and Troup County High School). The county is divided into three school zones. The county school system serves Hogansville, LaGrange and West Point. It is home to over 20 new and recently renovated schools.

=== Private education ===
- Hillside Montessori
- Lafayette Christian
- LaGrange Academy
- Oak Grove Christian Academy
- Sound Doctrine Christian Academy

=== Higher education ===
- LaGrange College - Main Campus
- Point University
- West Georgia Technical College

== Infrastructure ==
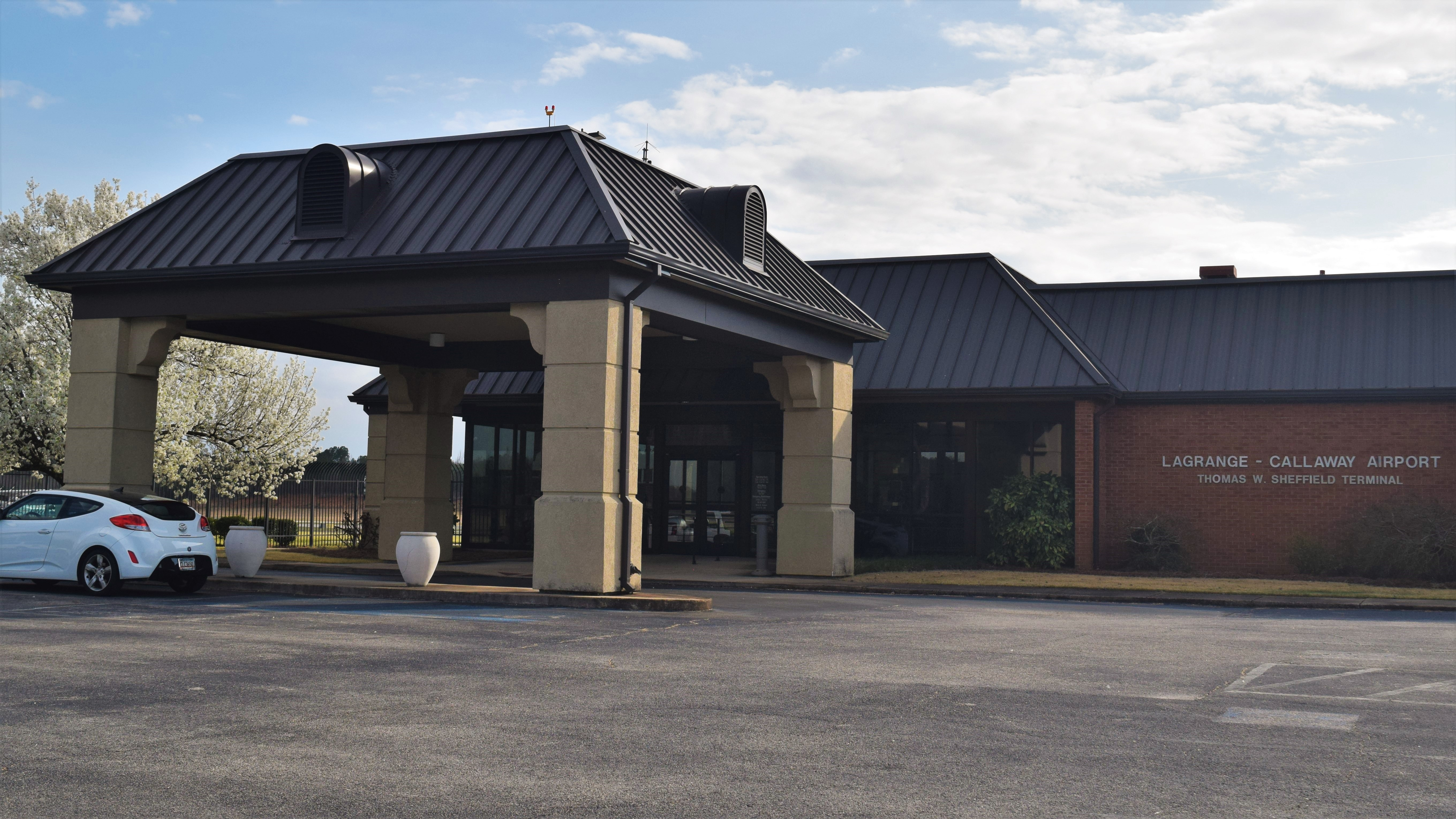
Thomas W. Sheffield Terminal at LaGrange Callaway Airport

=== Transportation ===
Highways in LaGrange include Interstate 85, Interstate 185, U.S. Route 27, U.S. Route 29, Georgia State Route 219, and Georgia State Route 109.

LaGrange-Callaway Airport is southwest of the city.

== Notable people ==
- J. Paul Austin - chairman, President, and CEO of The Coca-Cola Company, born in LaGrange.
- Lonnie Bartley - head coach of the Fort Valley State University women's basketball team, born in LaGrange
- Ryan Bliss – minor league baseball player in the Seattle Mariners organization, grew up in LaGrange
- Bob the Drag Queen – drag queen
- Hammett L. Bowen Jr. – recipient of Medal of Honor
- Mary G. Bryan – archivist
- Chris Burnette – NFL player
- Austin Callaway – 16-year-old African American youth lynched by whites on September 8, 1940
- Fuller Earle Callaway – textile magnate
- Daz Cameron – Major League Baseball player
- Mike Cameron – former Major League Baseball player
- Wallace H. Clark Jr. – pathologist and cancer researcher; born (c.1924) and raised in LaGrange
- Elizabeth Caroline Dowdell - leader of women's patriotic and religious organizations
- Joyce Grable – former professional wrestler; born (c. 1952) and raised in LaGrange
- Jimmy Haynes – Major League Baseball player
- Albert E. Jarrell – Vice Admiral, U.S. Navy; born in Rome, Georgia, but raised in LaGrange
- Tom Jarriel – ABC news correspondent; born in LaGrange in 1934
- John Johnson – National Football League (NFL) player
- Elijah Kelley – actor
- David Kelton – Major League Baseball player
- Mike Lazzo – network executive for Adult Swim
- Wynona Lipman (1923–1999) – first African-American woman elected to New Jersey Senate
- Randolph Mahaffey – professional basketball player, born in LaGrange
- Lincoln Wayne "Chips" Moman – record producer and songwriter
- Lewis Render Morgan – Georgia state representative and judge
- Fred Newman – actor
- Bubba Sparxxx – rapper
- James M. Sprayberry – recipient of the Medal of Honor
- Dernell Stenson – Major League Baseball Player
- Horace Ward – first African-American federal judge in Georgia; also first person to attempt to integrate University of Georgia law school
- Carla Williams - Athletic Director at the University of Virginia
- Wesley Woodyard – NFL player
- Louis Tompkins Wright – physician, graduate of Harvard Medical School, first African-American physician to be appointed to staff of a New York City municipal hospital; notable for many scientific breakthroughs, including introduction of intradermal smallpox vaccination

== Sister cities ==
Sister cities include:

- Craigavon, County Armagh, Northern Ireland
- Poti, Samegrelo-Zemo Svaneti, Georgia
- Aso, Kumamoto, Japan

== See also ==
- National Register of Historic Places listings in Troup County, Georgia
