= Wheeler High School (Georgia) =

Public high school in Marietta, Georgia, United States

Joseph Wheeler High School

Location
- 375 Holt Rd. Marietta, Georgia 30068; United States; 33°57′32″N 84°28′40″W

Information
- Type: Public high school
- Established: 1965; 61 years ago
- School district: Cobb County School District
- Principal: Dr. Sara Fetterman
- Teaching staff: 146.80 (FTE)
- Grades: 9–12
- Gender: Co-Educational
- Enrollment: 2,401 (2024–2025)
- Student to teacher ratio: 16.36
- Colors: Navy, Gold, & White
- Athletics conference: Georgia High School Association (GHSA)
- Sports: baseball, basketball, cheerleading, cross country, football, golf, gymnastics, lacrosse, soccer, softball, swimming, tennis, track, volleyball, wrestling
- Mascot: Wildcat
- Nickname: Wildcats
- Accreditation: Southern Association of Colleges and Schools
- Website: wheelerhigh.com
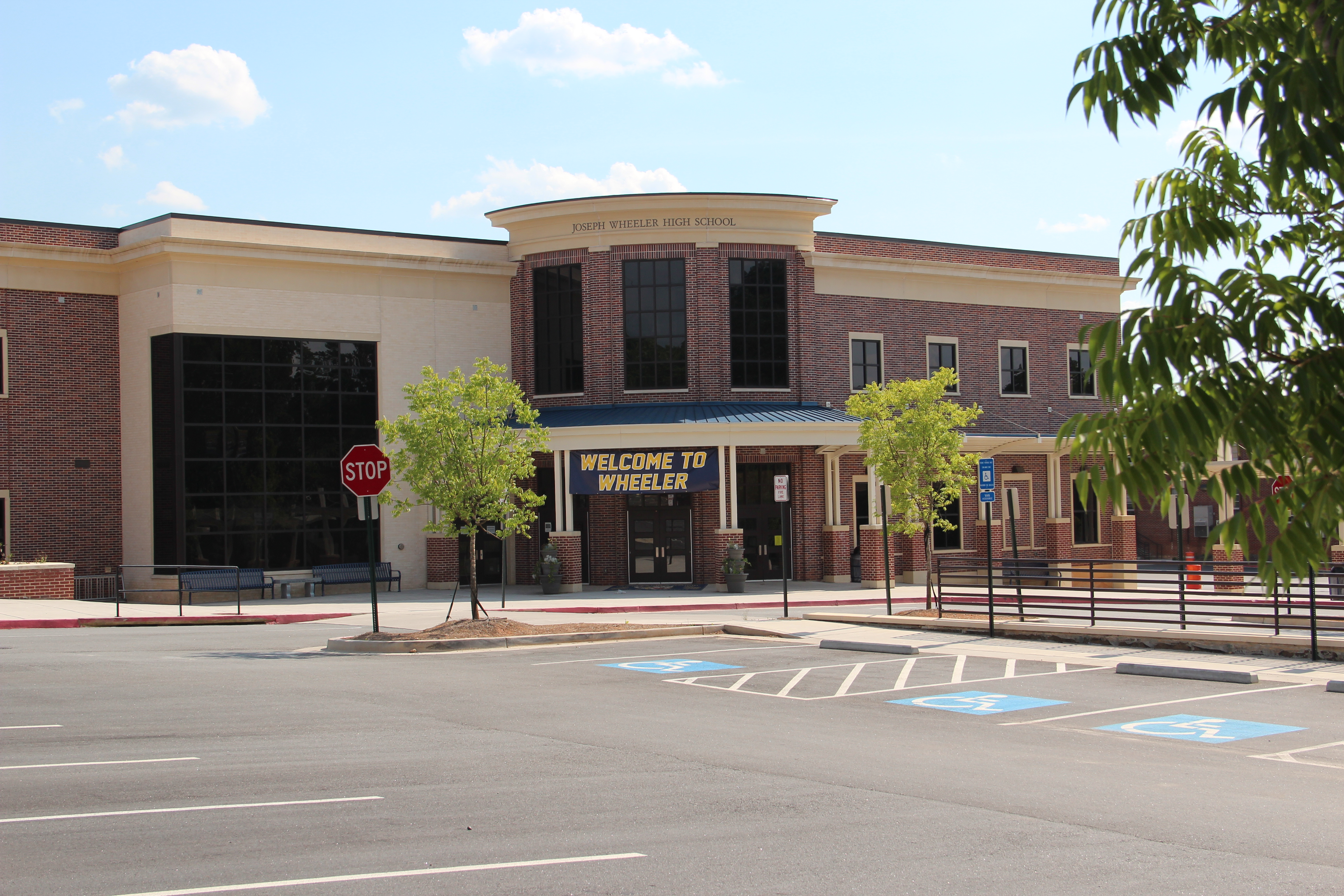
- Wheeler High School entrance

Wheeler High School is located in northeast Cobb County, Georgia, U.S. It is near the city of Marietta, about 15 miles (24 km) northwest of downtown Atlanta. The school has been in operation since 1965. It is a public high school, accredited by the Southern Association of Colleges and Schools. It is named for Joseph Wheeler who was a Confederate military leader, and later, an American military leader and politician.

== The Center For Advanced Studies in Science, Math, & Technology ==
Wheeler High School's Center For Advanced Studies in STEM (Science, Technology, Engineering, & Math) began teaching classes in 1999. Since then, it has accepted about 150 freshmen every year. Wheeler's program is a member of the National Consortium for Specialized Secondary Schools of Mathematics, Science, and Technology. The program allows magnet students to begin taking college-level (Advanced Placement) courses in math and science by tenth grade and participate in internships at local businesses in twelfth grade. In 2014 the magnet program earned the STEM Certified School Outreach from Tag-Ed, a Georgia STEM organization.

== Efforts to change name ==
In June 2020, students, alumni, and community members began circulating an online petition to change the name of Wheeler High School due to the namesake's ties to the Confederate States of America. The petition received support from Charisse Davis, the school board member representing Wheeler High School and the school's Student Government Association. Opponents of the move included school board member David Banks, who said that the issue is overly politicized and that Wheeler's later service as an American politician and as an American military leader during the Spanish-American war should be noted. As of March 2021, the name change was still under consideration. The movement has received praise from notable alumni including Jaylen Brown.

== Notable alumni ==
- Amir Abdur-Rahim '00: Head Coach, South Florida Bulls men's basketball
- Shareef Abdur-Rahim '95: NBA forward, Olympic gold medalist for the U.S. national basketball team
- Brad Armstrong '80: former professional wrestler
- Tope Awotona: Billionaire, founder of Calendly
- Jaylen Brown '15: Philadelphia 76ers forward, 2024 NBA Finals MVP
- Brett Butler: comedian and actress
- Byron Capers '93: former NFL/CFL pro football
- Isaiah Collier '23: Utah Jazz guard, #1 National Recruit
- Jermareo Davidson '03: NBA power forward
- Randy Edwards: former NFL football player
- Tiera Guinn Fletcher: Boeing and NASA engineer
- Robby Ginepri '01: former professional tennis player
- Dax Griffin '90: actor
- Linda Hamilton '87: defender, U.S. Women's National soccer team
- Jeremy Hermida '02: Major League Baseball player
- JJ Hickson '07: Former NBA player (McDonald’s All-American)
- Richard Howell '09: American-Israeli basketball player for Hapoel Tel Aviv of the Israeli Basketball Premier League
- Tammy Susan Hurt '83: Vice Chair of the Board of Trustees of the Recording Academy
- DeQuan Jones '08: Orlando Magic forward
- Jelan Kendrick '10: basketball player
- Geoff Knorr: '03: composer and recording engineer
- Douglas Lima '06: professional mixed martial artist, competing for Bellator MMA
- Harold Melton '84: Former Chief Justice of the Supreme Court of Georgia
- Aries Merritt '03: All-American hurdles, 2012 Olympics U.S. Men's Track Team, gold medalist in 110m hurdles, world record holder in 110m hurdles
- Charles Mitchell '12: basketball player
- Shane Monahan '92: former Major League Baseball player, Seattle Mariners
- E. J. Montgomery '18: basketball player
- Darius Perry '17: basketball player
- Ron Pope: musician
- Robert Shaw '75: former NFL football player
- Pam Stone '77: actress on Coach, comedian, writer, and talk radio host
- Becca Tobin '04: actress on Glee
- Jordan Tucker '17: basketball player
- Bob Tway: PGA Tour golfer and 1986 PGA Championship winner
- Jordan Usher '17: basketball player
- Romello White '16: basketball player for Hapoel Eilat of the Israeli Basketball Premier League
- Reggie Witherspoon '03: All-American 400m, 2008 Olympics U.S. Men's Track Team, gold medalist in 4 × 400 m relay
- Trey Wolfe '07: NFL Player
- Colben Landrew, college basketball player for the UConn Huskies
