= Lonnie Bartley =

American college basketball coach

Biographical details
- Born: LaGrange, Georgia, US
- Education: Fort Valley State University

Coaching career (HC unless noted)
- 1983–2013 2016–2017: Fort Valley State University women's basketball

Lonnie Bartley is an American college basketball coach. He was head coach of the Fort Valley State University Lady Wildcats basketball team for more than thirty years. When he retired in 2017, he was ranked 39th on the list of National Collegiate Athletic Association (NCAA) women's basketball coaches and 8th in NCAA Division II.

== Early life ==
Bartley is a native of LaGrange, Georgia. He graduated from Troup County High School in LaGrange, where he lettered in three sports. After graduation, he worked in a textile mill in LaGrange.

Bartley entered Fort Valley State University in January 1977. While a student there, he played basketball the first semester of his freshman year, but quit after a losing season. He then worked as a scorekeeper for Lady Wildcats basketball games and was promoted to team manager. He then became a student assistance for coach Jessie Brown. He was also a member of Alpha Phi Omega. He graduated from Fort Valley in 1983.

Bartley continued with graduate school at Fort Valley.

== Career ==
In 1983, Bartley became an assistant coach of the Fort Valley State University Lady Wildcats basketball team. Bartley became head coach of the Lady Wildcats in 1984. In his first 29 years as a coach, he led his teams to 27 consecutive winning seasons, 29 Southern Intercollegiate Athletic Conference (SIAC) tournaments, and 11 SIAC titles. He had his 632nd victory as the coach of the Lady Wildcats basketball team on January 14, 2013, making him the winningest women's basketball coach at an historical black college or university. He retired in 2013.

Bartley came out of retirement as the interim coach of the Lady Wildcats from 2015 to 2017. This time took his career total wins to 652. He retired for the second time af the 2016–2017 season. After that season, he was ranked 39 on the list of National Collegiate Athletic Association (NCAA) women's basketball coaches. He also ranked 8 in NCAA Division II.

== Honors ==
The Women's Basketball Coaches Association named Bartley the College Coach of the Year. The Atlanta Tip-Off Club named him the Georgia Division II Coach of the Year in 2006. The Black College Sports Information Directors Association named him College Coach of the Year. The Southern Intercollegiate Athletic Conference named him Coach of the Year ten times. He was named the Russell Athletic/Women’s Basketball Coaches Association NCAA Division II Region Five co-Coach of the Year for 2009–2010.

In 2011, Bartley was inducted into the National Black College Alumni Hall of Fame. He was inducted into the Georgia Sports Hall of Fame in 2020.

== See also ==
- List of college women's basketball career coaching wins leaders
