= Larry Eugene Rivers =

American academic administrator, educator, historian (born 1950)

President of Fort Valley State University
- In office 2006–2013
- Preceded by: Kofi Lomotey
- Succeeded by: Ivelaw Griffith

Personal details
- Born: 1950 (age 75–76) Philadelphia, Pennsylvania, U.S.
- Spouse: Betty Jean Hubbard
- Children: 2
- Education: Fort Valley State University (BA), Villanova University (MA), Carnegie Mellon University (PhD), University of London (PhD)
- Occupation: Academic administrator, former college president, historian, history professor, author

Larry Eugene Rivers (born 1950) is an American academic administrator, former college president, history professor, and author. He served as President of Fort Valley State University.

== Biography and education ==
Larry Eugene Rivers was born in 1950, in the Sharon Hill section of Philadelphia, Pennsylvania. He is Baptist.

He has a bachelor's degree from Fort Valley State University, and a master's degree from Villanova University. He received doctorate degrees from Carnegie Mellon University, and the University of London. His thesis for his doctorate from the University of London was "Florida's Dissenters, Rebels, and Runaways: Territorial Days to Emancipation" (2002).

Rivers married Betty Jean Hubbard, who worked for the City of Tallahassee, and has two sons.

== Career ==
From 2002 until 2006, Rivers served as Dean of the college of arts and sciences at Florida A&M University, where he was a colleague of Canter Brown Jr.

In 2006, Rivers became the president of his alma mater Fort Valley State University in Fort Valley, Georgia, following the departure of Kofi Lomotey. He held that role until 2013, and succeeded by Ivelaw Griffith.

He was a history professor at Valdosta State University (VSU) in Valdosta, Georgia from 2013 to 2017.

== Bibliography ==
- Rivers, Larry Eugene; Brown Jr., Canter (2001). Laborers in the Vineyard of the Lord: The Beginnings of the AME Church in Florida, 1865–1895. Gainesville, FL: University Press of Florida.
- Larry Eugene Rivers (2008). Slavery in Florida: Territorial Days to Emancipation. University Press of Florida. ISBN 978-0-8130-3381-5.
- The Varieties of Women's Experiences: Portraits of Southern Women in the Post-Civil War Century. Gainesville: University Press of Florida, 2010. (with Canter Brown, co-ed.)
- Mary Edwards Bryan : Her Early Life and Works University Press of Florida, 2016. (with Canter Brown Jr.)
- Rebels and Runaways: Slave Resistance in 19th Century Florida. University of Illinois Press, 2017.
- Father James Page: An Enslaved Preacher's Climb to Freedom. Johns Hopkins University Press, 2021.
