= LaGrange Callaway Airport =

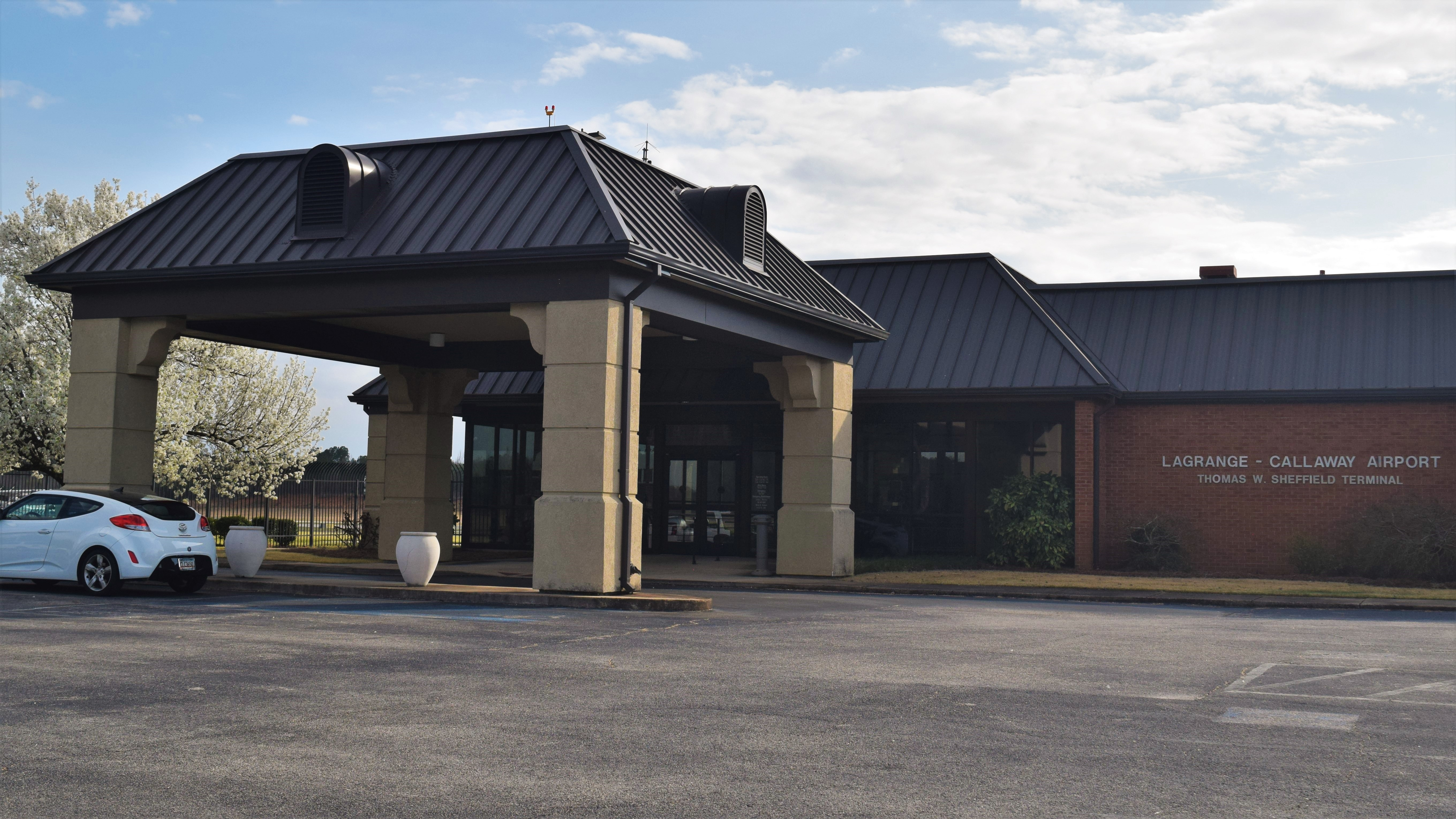
- IATA: LGC; ICAO: KLGC; FAA LID: LGC

Summary
- Airport type: Public
- Owner: City of LaGrange & Troup County
- Operator: Troup County Airport Authority
- Serves: LaGrange, Georgia
- Elevation AMSL: 693 ft (211 m)
- Coordinates: 33°00′32″N 085°04′21″W
- Website: LaGrangeAirport.com
- Interactive map of LaGrange Callaway Airport

Runways
Direction	Length		Surface
Direction	ft	m	Surface
13/31	6,499	1,981	Asphalt
3/21	5,000	1,524	Asphalt

Statistics (2021)
- Aircraft operations: 15,100
- Based aircraft: 46
- Source: Federal Aviation Administration

LaGrange Callaway Airport (IATA: LGC, ICAO: KLGC, FAA LID: LGC) is a public airport three miles southwest of LaGrange, in Troup County, Georgia, United States. The FAA's National Plan of Integrated Airport Systems for 2009-2013 called it a general aviation airport.

== Ownership ==
The airport is a public-use airport that is owned by the City of LaGrange and Troup County and operated by the Troup County Airport Authority. Tax revenue generated by the sale of fuel and hangar space is collected by Troup County.

== History ==
Between 1950 and 1953 LaGrange was served by airline flights operated by Southern Airways on their DC-3s.

== Facilities ==
LaGrange Callaway Airport covers 751 acres (304 ha) at an elevation of 693 feet (211 m). It has two asphalt runways: 13/31 is 6,499 by 100 feet (1,981 x 30 m) and 3/21 is 5,000 by 100 feet (1,524 x 30 m).

== Statistics ==
In the year ending December 31, 2021, the airport had 15,100 aircraft operations, average 41 per day: 99% general aviation and 1% military. 46 aircraft were then based at the airport: 33 single-engine, 5 multi-engine, 1 jet, 1 helicopter, and 1 glider.

== See also ==
- List of airports in Georgia (U.S. state)
