= Fort Valley State University =

Historically black university in Fort Valley, Georgia, US

- Former name: Fort Valley State College (1939–1996)
- Motto: Be Bold. Be Amazing. Be Prepared.
- Type: Public land-grant historically black university
- Established: 1939; 87 years ago
- Parent institution: University System of Georgia
- Academic affiliations: Space-grant
- Endowment: $12.7 million
- President: Paul Jones
- Administrative staff: 400
- Students: 2,182 (fall 2021)
- Location: Fort Valley, Georgia, U.S. 32°32′3.9″N 83°53′45.8″W
- Campus: 1,365 acres (5.52 km^{2})
- Colors: Royal blue and old gold
- Nickname: Wildcats
- Sporting affiliations: NCAA Division II – SIAC
- Website: fvsu.edu
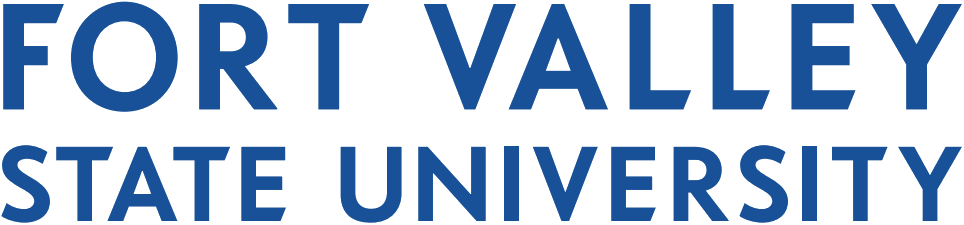

Fort Valley State University (FVSU; formerly Fort Valley State College) is a public land-grant historically Black university in Fort Valley, Georgia, United States. It is part of the University System of Georgia and a member-school of the Thurgood Marshall College Fund.

Fort Valley State University is the state's 1890 land-grant university and enrolls over 2,500 students. Approximately 90% of the student body is of Black American descent. The university is located in the town of Fort Valley in Peach County. Its 1,365-acre (5.52 km^{2}) main campus is Georgia's largest public university in area.

== History ==
Fort Valley State University, was founded as Fort Valley State College in 1939. It began with the 1939 consolidation of the Fort Valley High and Industrial School (founded in 1890, chartered in 1896), and the State Teachers and Agricultural College for Negroes of Forsyth, Georgia (founded in 1902). Both schools had been founded privately, and were affiliated with the American Missionary Association; they were transferred to state control and operation, to form Fort Valley State College.

In 1947, the state Board of Regents adopted a resolution moving the "land grant" designation from Georgia State College (later Savannah State University) to Fort Valley State College. In response to the Regents' resolution, in 1949 the Georgia General Assembly officially designated the Fort Valley State College as the Land-Grant College for Negroes in Georgia. During this time, public education was segregated due to Jim Crow laws.

The school became Fort Valley State University, a state and land-grant university, in June 1996.

=== Presidents ===
The president of Fort Valley State University is the chief executive officer of the university. Paul Jones has held the position since 2015. The complete list of presidents includes:

Presidents of Fort Valley State University
Name	Years	Notes
Horace Mann Bond	1939–1945	
Cornelius V. Troup	1945–1966	
Waldo W. E. Blanchet	1966–1973	
Cleveland W. Pettigrew	1973–1982	
Luther Burse	1983–1989	
Oscar L. Prater	1991–2001	
Kofi Lomotey	2001–2005	
Larry Eugene Rivers	2006–2013	
Ivelaw Griffith	2013–2014	
Paul Jones	2015–present	

== Academics ==
Fort Valley State University offers bachelor's degrees in more than 50 majors, as well as master's degrees in several fields of study. FVSU is accredited by the Commission on Colleges of the Southern Association of Colleges and Schools (SACS) to award associate, baccalaureate, master's and specialist degrees.

The university also offers the Cooperative Developmental Energy Program (CDEP) which provides an opportunity for qualified students to receive a STEM degree from FVSU and an engineering degree from the Georgia Institute of Technology, University of Texas at Austin, Pennsylvania State University, University of Arkansas at Fayetteville, or University of Texas at Rio Grande Valley.

The university's honors program is a selective undergraduate program designed to cater to high-achieving students.

Outreach services include Fort Valley State's Cooperative Extension Service Program, where extension service specialists operate in 42 Georgia counties, and the Pettigrew Conference Center, which hosts more than 500 courses and events for 51,000 patrons each year. In an effort to accommodate graduate and non-traditional students, external degree program courses are also being offered at off-campus sites in Macon, Cochran, Warner Robins and Dublin. The university offers online courses via WebCT, which allows students to pursue a number of majors and programs from home.

=== College of Arts and Sciences ===
The College of Arts and Sciences, the oldest and the largest college at FVSU, houses 12 academic units and offers nearly 80 percent of the courses taught at FVSU. The college services the University System of Georgia's Academic Core and provides 20 undergraduate major fields of study. The Department of Business Administration and Economics is the largest academic department in the College of Arts and Sciences, and is an accredited member of the Accreditation Council for Business Schools and Programs (ACBSP).

=== College of Education ===
The College of Education is an educator preparation program offering degrees in Middle Grades Education, undergraduate and graduate; Agriculture Education, undergraduate and post-baccalaureate; Early Childhood / Special Education undergraduate; School Counseling; Early Childhood / Special Education graduate; Health and Physical Education; Family and Consumer Sciences Education; and an MAT degree in the secondary teaching areas.

=== College of Agriculture, Family Sciences and Technology ===
The College of Agriculture, Home Economics & Allied Programs is ranked 25th nationally in the production of Black American agriculturists, and placing first-time applicants into medical, dental, veterinary and pharmacy schools and colleges since 2001. The college has laboratories in the state, and scientists are securing grant funds and conducting research.

== Campus ==
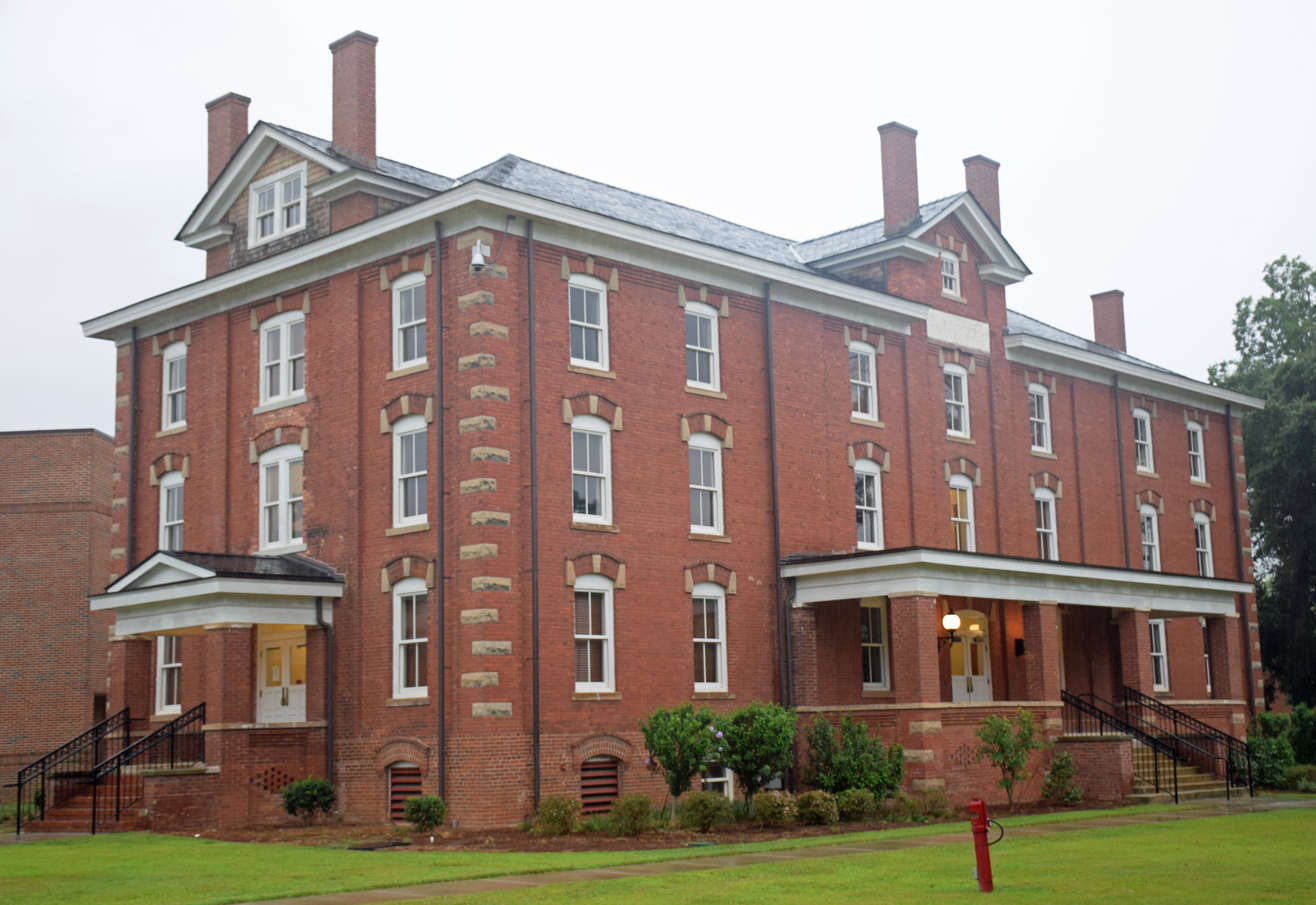
Huntington Hall

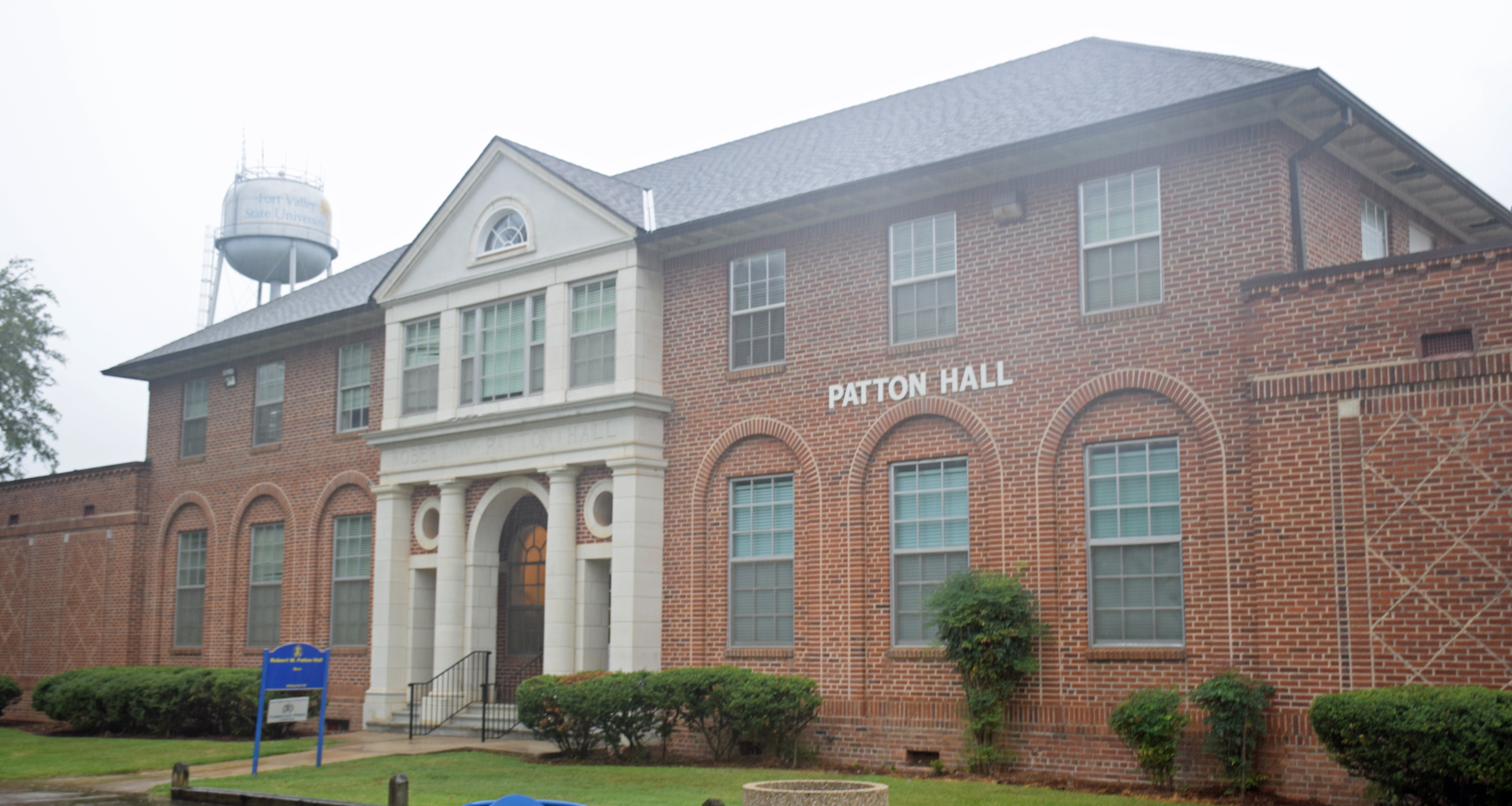
Patton Hall

=== Pettigrew Center ===
Pettigrew Farm and Community Life Center is a conference, convention, and fine arts facility. It was named after the fourth university president, Cleveland W. Pettigrew.

=== Anderson House ===
Anderson House was the residence of Francis W. Gano, one of the university's founders. It is the oldest facility on campus. The exhibits and displays in the house come from the Biggs Collection of period furnishings, silver, glassware, china, quilts, linens and civil war memorabilia.

== Student life ==
Undergraduate demographics as of Fall 2023
Race and ethnicity	Total
Black	92%
Two or more races	3%
Hispanic	2%
White	2%
Economic diversity
Low-income (Note: The percentage of students who received an income-based federal Pell grant intended for low-income students.)	73%
Affluent (Note: The percentage of students who are a part of the American middle class at the bare minimum.)	27%

Student activities at Fort Valley State University include NCAA Division II intercollegiate athletics, The Blue Machine Marching Band, concert choir, Baptist Student Union Choir, forensics (intercollegiate speech and debate), and cheerleading. Overall, there are more than 70 clubs, social, and Greek organizations on campus.

=== Student media ===
FVSU has a radio station (WFVS-FM 96.9) and a television station (FVSU TV), as well as a college newspaper, The Peachite.

=== Athletics ===
Athletic opportunities include intramural sports and intercollegiate men's basketball, cross country, football, tennis, and track and field, and volleyball and women's basketball, cross country, softball, tennis, volleyball, and track and field. The school currently competes as a member of the Southern Intercollegiate Athletic Conference.

== Notable alumni ==
Name	Class year	Notability	Reference(s)
Eddie Anderson	1986	Former NFL safety for the Seattle Seahawks and Los Angeles/Oakland Raiders	
Lonnie Bartley	1983	Head coach of the Fort Valley State University women's basketball team	
John W. Blassingame	1960	Professor and Chair of African Studies at Yale University for 29 years	
Catherine Hardy Lavender	1952	Olympic sprinter, won a gold medal in 1952 in the 4 × 100 metres relay	
Nick Harper	2001	Former NFL cornerback for the Tennessee Titans and Indianapolis Colts	
Robert J. Jones	1973	Chancellor at the University of Illinois at Urbana–Champaign	
Marquette King	2012	Former NFL punter for the Oakland Raiders and Denver Broncos	
Greg Lloyd	1987	Former NFL Pro Bowl player for the Pittsburgh Steelers	
Ricardo Lockette		Former NFL wide receiver for the Seattle Seahawks, San Francisco 49ers	
Tyrone Poole	1995	First-round pick by the Carolina Panthers; earned two Super Bowl rings with the New England Patriots as starter on the 2003 and 2004 teams	
Charles Robinson Jr.	1970	President and CEO of Sadie G. Mays Health and Rehabilitation Center in Atlanta; first African American to become certified by the American College of Healthcare Administrators	
Calvin Smyre	1970	Elected to the Georgia House of Representatives in 1974 as its youngest member at age 26; current Executive Vice President of the $34 billion financial corporation Synovus Foundation	
Melanie Thornton	1985	Former original lead singer of chart-topping and platinum-selling music group La Bouche.	
Derrick Wimbush		Former NFL player	
Trey Wolfe	2014	Former NFL cornerback; NCAA career leader interceptions per game (2013)	
Rayfield Wright	1967	NFL Hall of Fame inductee	
Peppi Zellner		Former NFL player	
