= Bill Arp, Georgia =

Unincorporated community in Georgia, U.S.

Coordinates: 33°40′12″N 84°48′21″W

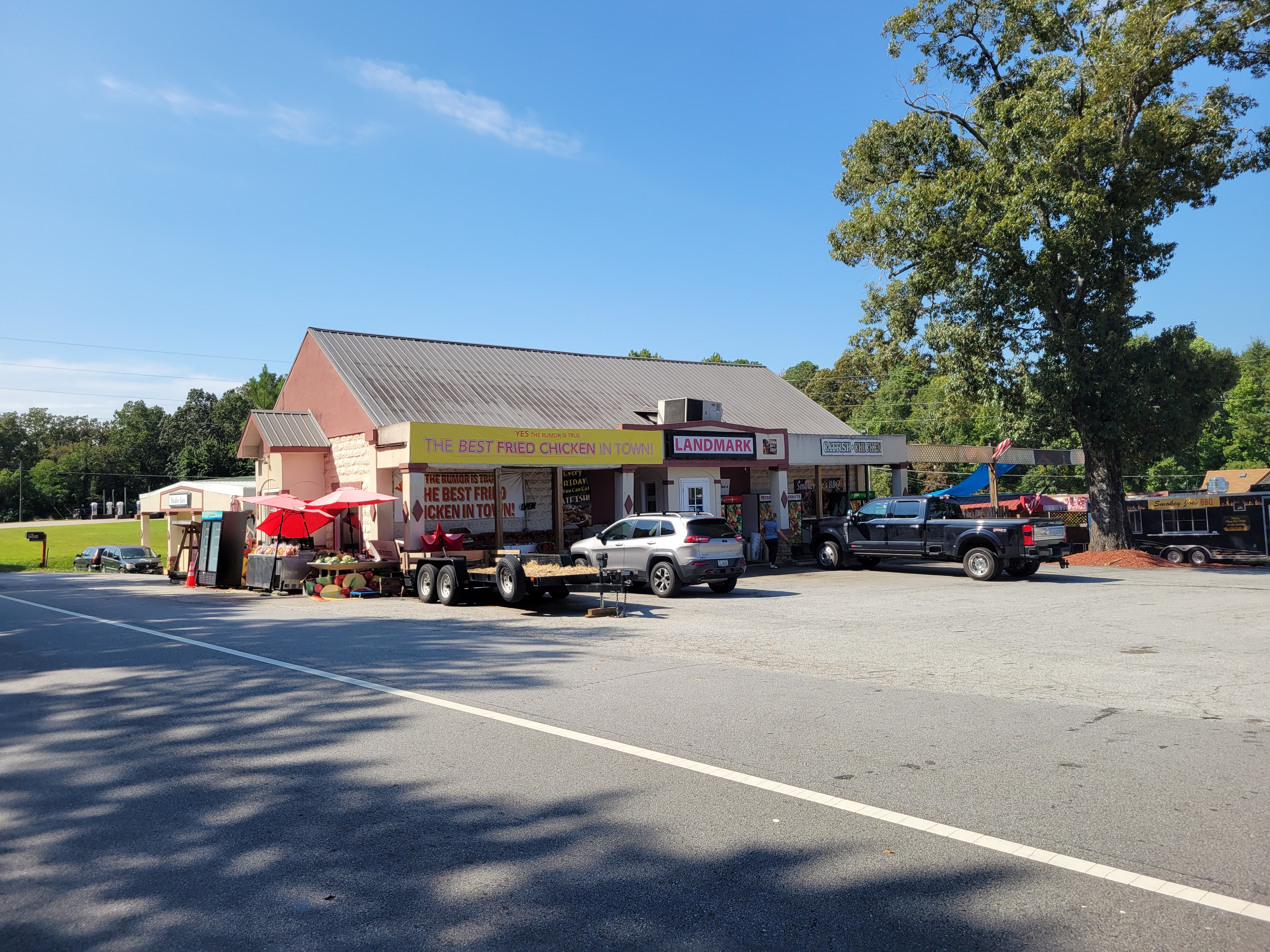
Landmark Country Buffet

Bill Arp is an unincorporated community in Douglas County, Georgia, United States. The nearby communities are Winston and Douglasville.

A post office called Billarp was established in 1885, and remained in operation until 1907. The community has the name of humorist Bill Arp.
