= Douglas County, Georgia =

County in Georgia, United States

- County
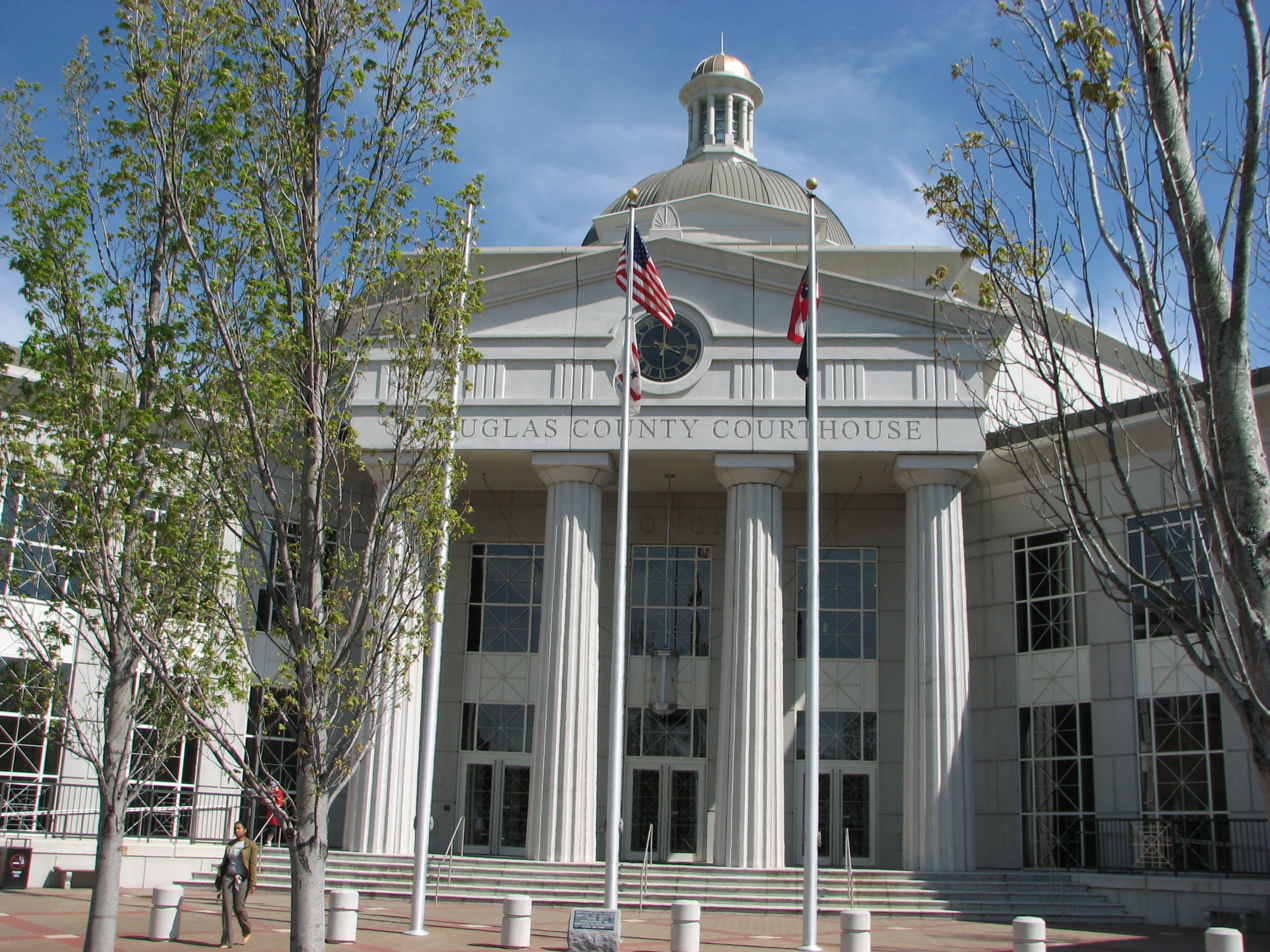
- Douglas County courthouse in Douglasville

- Flag Seal

- Location within the U.S. state of Georgia
- Coordinates: 33°42′N 84°46′W
- Country: United States
- State: Georgia
- Founded: 1870; 156 years ago
- Named for: Stephen A. Douglas
- Seat: Douglasville
- Largest city: Douglasville

Area
  - Total: 201 sq mi (520 km^{2})
  - Land: 200 sq mi (520 km^{2})
  - Water: 1.0 sq mi (2.6 km^{2}) 0.5%

Population (2020)
  - Total: 144,237
  - Estimate (2025): 154,293 ▲
  - Density: 721/sq mi (278/km^{2})
- Time zone: UTC−5 (Eastern)
  - Summer (DST): UTC−4 (EDT)
- Congressional districts: 6th, 3rd
- Website: douglascountyga.gov

Douglas County is a county located in the north central portion of the U.S. state of Georgia. As of the 2020 U.S. census, the population was 144,237, having more than doubled since 1990. The county seat is Douglasville. The city of Villa Rica, and a small portion of Austell are both also located in Douglas County. Douglas County is included in Metro Atlanta. It has attracted new residents as jobs have increased in the Atlanta area.

== History ==
=== Name ===
The county was created during Reconstruction after the American Civil War. The Georgia General Assembly named it after former Illinois senator Stephen A. Douglas, an Illinois senator and the Democratic opponent of Abraham Lincoln in the presidential election of 1860. The existing historical marker says:

Historical marker:

This county, created by Act of the Legislature October 1, 1870, was named for Stephen A. Douglas, the "Little Giant," a Vermonter who was Congressman from Illinois 1843 to '47, Senator from '47 to '61, and Democratic candidate for President in 1860 on the ticket with gov. Herschel V. Johnson, of Georgia, for Vice President. Among the first County Officers were: sheriff T.H. Sellman, Clerk of Superior Court A.L. Gorman, Ordinary Wm. Hindman, Tax Receiver Jno. M. James, Tax Collector M.D. Watkins, Treasurer C.P. Bower, Surveyor John M. Hughey. The county was created from the part of Campbell county which was northwest of the Chattahoochee River. The remainder of Campbell became southwest Fulton at the beginning of 1932.

=== County seat ===
The act creating Douglas County provided that in November 1870, voters of the new county would elect county officers, and vote to select the site of the county seat. In the election, some voters chose a site near the center of the county, but a larger number voted for the settlement known as "Skinned Chestnut" or "Skin(t) Chestnut," based on a Creek Indian landmark tree. The courthouse commissioners chose this site as county seat and proceeded to sell lots and build a courthouse. It later changed its name to Douglasville.

A group of citizens filed suit against the commissioners. The case ultimately went to the Supreme Court of Georgia, which ruled against the commissioners. Both sides agreed to postpone further action until the route of the Georgia Western Railroad through Douglas County was determined. The General Assembly enacted legislation on February 28, 1874, directing that an election be held on April 7, 1874, to determine the location of the county seat—but with the provision that the site be located on the Georgia Western Railroad. In the election, voters confirmed Douglasville as the county seat. On February 25, 1875, the General Assembly incorporated Douglasville.

== Geography ==
According to the U.S. Census Bureau, the county has a total area of 201 square miles (520 km^{2}), of which 200 square miles (520 km^{2}) is land and 1.0 square mile (2.6 km^{2}) (0.5%) is water.

Douglas County's elevation above sea level ranges as low as 740 feet (230 m) at the Chattahoochee River to as high as 1,340 feet (410 m); one of the county's highest elevation points lies inside the city of Douglasville. Andy Mountain, between Villa Rica and Winston – west of Douglasville along Bankhead Highway, has the highest elevation in Douglas County. Two other elevated summits are located in the county, known as Cedar Mountain at 1,257 feet (383 m), and Pine Mountain at 1,180 feet (360 m).

Douglas County sits in Georgia's Piedmont region, which makes its elevation vary due to many rolling hills that Douglas County sits on near the tail end of the Appalachian Mountains. There are no high mountain peaks in Douglas County, just a range of ridges, hills and valleys.

The entirety of Douglas County is located in the Middle Chattahoochee River-Lake Harding sub-basin of the ACF River Basin (Apalachicola-Chattahoochee-Flint River Basin).

Location	Height
Andy Mountain	1,340 feet (408 m)
Cedar Mountain, Georgia	1,257 feet (383 m)
Winston	1,221 feet (372 m)
Downtown Douglasville	1,209 feet (369 m)
Beulah	1,184 feet (361 m)
Pine Mountain	1,180 feet (360 m)
White City	1,177 feet (359 m)
Fairplay	1,170 feet (357 m)
Wellstar Douglas Hospital	1,120 feet (341 m)
Midway	1,080 feet (329 m)
Hannah	1,077 feet (328 m)
McWhorter	1,067 feet (325 m)
Lithia Springs	1,043 feet (318 m)
Villa Rica	1,040 feet (317 m)
Groovers Lake	905 feet (276 m)

=== Bodies of water ===
- The Chattahoochee River borders the county to the east and southeast.
- Sweetwater Creek runs in the eastern side of the county in the Lithia Springs area. The USGS stream gauge (NWS identifier AUSG1) at Lithia Springs is considered to be "near Austell" by the National Weather Service, however, even though that city is further away and in Cobb and not Douglas.
- George Sparks Reservoir makes its home at Sweetwater Creek State Park.
- The Dog River is a small, almost creek like river in the western side of Douglas county and travels south and eastward until it ends at the Dog River Reservoir in the southern part of the county.
- The Dog River Reservoir is Douglas County's main source of drinking water, and also serves as a recreational lake for residents of the county.

All of these water sources had massive flooding during the 2009 Atlanta floods.

=== Climate ===
Douglas County has been experiencing numerous natural disasters over the most recent decades. Being located in the Southeastern United States' Dixie Alley, the county experiences strong storms and tornadoes.

The county has suffered through numerous ice storms throughout the years. They bring everything to a stand still in the area due to the lack of equipment to deal with the road ice problem and drastic amounts of power outages. Some of the worst ice storms were in 1938, 1994, 1998, 2000, 2005, and 2010.

The March 1993 Storm of the Century brought 17 inches (43 cm) to Douglasville, with drifts measuring several feet.

In 2005, Hurricane Katrina's remnants tore through the area spawning tornadoes, causing wind damage, and flooding rains. Katrina killed 2 people in Georgia.

In 2007, the county suffered one of the worst droughts in the area's history, causing a complete watering ban and resulting in the Bugaboo Fire, the largest wildfire in Georgia history. The fire was located in southeast Georgia's Okefenokee Swamp, but it still affected the county with smoke often through the life of the fire.

2008 was the first time in Douglas County history that two tornadoes touched down in the same year. They were:

- March 7, 2008: This tornado damaged many homes and ripping one home in half in the Brookmont subdivision on Chapel Hill Road. Arbor Place Mall also reported broken windows from the storm. The tornado also damaged the Chapel Hill Kroger grocery store and threw a heavy air conditioning unit onto cars below. There was only one injury reported from the storm.
- May 11, 2008: Known as the "Mother's Day Tornado," the EF2 caused damage all over the county. It first touched down in the Fairplay area and then moved through the rest of the county, picking up wind speeds up to 110 mph (180 km/h) . A filling station in Douglasville was destroyed by the storm, with the large roof being thrown onto the street. No injuries or deaths were reported. The governor of Georgia declared a state of emergency for Douglas County and many other counties in the state on May 12, 2008.

On September 21, 2009, Douglas County was devastated by the worst flood in Georgia history. Over 18 inches (460 mm) of rain fell in one night causing many roads to be destroyed and many homes a total loss. The county was later declared a disaster area, and the governor of Georgia declared a state of emergency. The flooding's worst affected areas were in the areas of Douglasville, Villa Rica, Austell, Lithia Springs, and Chapel Hill. The disaster killed more than eight people in the county, most of them in the Douglasville area. The Austell death toll was also high but it was reported in the Cobb County losses.

On Sunday night on January 9, 2011, right after Douglasville's first white Christmas in decades, a snowstorm developed over Douglas County and caused as much as 8 inches of snow in the area. The storm closed grocery stores, the courthouse, and Arbor Place Mall until that Wednesday, January 12. Schools were closed the entire second week of January.

=== Adjacent counties ===
- Cobb County– northeast
- Fulton County – southeast
- Carroll County – west
- Paulding County – northwest

== Communities ==
=== Cities ===
- Austell: Most of Austell is in Cobb County, GA with a small portion extending into northeastern Douglas County
- Douglasville (county seat)
- Villa Rica: The western portion of Villa Rica is located in Carroll County, GA

=== Census-designated places ===
- Fairplay
- Lithia Springs: Formerly a city, but voted to dissolve in 2000.

=== Unincorporated communities ===
- Beulah
- Bill Arp
- Chapel Hill
- Fairplay
- Hannah
- McWhorter
- White City
- Winston

== Demographics ==
Historical population
Census	Pop.	Note	%±
1880	6,934		—
1890	7,794		12.4%
1900	8,745		12.2%
1910	8,953		2.4%
1920	10,477		17.0%
1930	9,461		−9.7%
1940	10,053		6.3%
1950	12,173		21.1%
1960	16,741		37.5%
1970	28,659		71.2%
1980	54,573		90.4%
1990	71,120		30.3%
2000	92,174		29.6%
2010	132,403		43.6%
2020	144,237		8.9%
2025 (est.)	154,293	▲	7.0%
U.S. Decennial Census; 1790-1880 1890-1910; 1920-1930 1930-1940; 1940-1950 1960-1980; 1980-2000 2010 2020

=== Racial and ethnic composition ===
Douglas County, Georgia – Racial and ethnic composition Note: the US Census treats Hispanic/Latino as an ethnic category. This table excludes Latinos from the racial categories and assigns them to a separate category. Hispanics/Latinos may be of any race.
Race / Ethnicity (NH = Non-Hispanic)	Pop 1980	Pop 1990	Pop 2000	Pop 2010	Pop 2020	% 1980	% 1990	% 2000	% 2010	% 2020
White alone (NH)	51,147	64,251	69,965	64,911	49,877	93.72%	90.34%	75.91%	49.03%	34.58%
Black or African American alone (NH)	2,792	5,553	16,978	51,387	68,763	5.12%	7.81%	18.42%	38.81%	47.67%
Native American or Alaska Native alone (NH)	114	171	272	321	335	0.21%	0.24%	0.30%	0.24%	0.23%
Asian alone (NH)	108	377	1,075	1,876	2,313	0.20%	0.53%	1.17%	1.42%	1.60%
Native Hawaiian or Pacific Islander alone (NH)	x	x	17	128	97	x	x	0.02%	0.10%	0.07%
Other race alone (NH)	35	19	107	327	1,072	0.06%	0.03%	0.12%	0.25%	0.74%
Mixed race or Multiracial (NH)	x	x	1,120	2,328	5,745	x	x	1.22%	1.76%	3.98%
Hispanic or Latino (any race)	377	749	2,640	11,125	16,035	0.69%	1.05%	2.86%	8.40%	11.12%
Total	54,573	71,120	92,174	132,403	144,237	100.00%	100.00%	100.00%	100.00%	100.00%

=== 2020 census ===
As of the 2020 census, the county had a population of 144,237, with 51,024 households and 32,898 families.

The median age was 37.5 years, 24.8% of residents were under the age of 18, and 12.5% were 65 years of age or older. For every 100 females there were 90.0 males, and for every 100 females age 18 and over there were 86.1 males. 84.5% of residents lived in urban areas, while 15.5% lived in rural areas.

The racial makeup of the county was 36.2% White, 48.4% Black or African American, 0.5% American Indian and Alaska Native, 1.6% Asian, 0.1% Native Hawaiian and Pacific Islander, 5.8% from some other race, and 7.3% from two or more races. Hispanic or Latino residents of any race comprised 11.1% of the population.

Of those households, 37.0% had children under the age of 18 living with them and 31.1% had a female householder with no spouse or partner present. About 22.7% of all households were made up of individuals and 7.1% had someone living alone who was 65 years of age or older.

There were 53,885 housing units, of which 5.3% were vacant. Among occupied housing units, 65.9% were owner-occupied and 34.1% were renter-occupied. The homeowner vacancy rate was 1.5% and the rental vacancy rate was 6.5%.

== Economy ==
Per Capita Income Growth for Douglas County:

Year	Income	Increase
1994	$19,189	—
1995	$20,320	5.894%
1997	$22,386	10.17%
1998	$23,201	3.641%
1999	$24,457	5.414%
2000	$26,272	7.421%
2001	$26,455	0.6966%
2002	$26,191	-0.9979%
2003	$26,048	-0.546%
2004	$26,687	2.453%

Douglas County is part of the greater Appalachia region, is served by the Appalachian Regional Commission, and is currently a transitional economy.

== Healthcare ==
Douglas County is served by WellStar Douglas Hospital.

Tanner Health System serves Douglas County with three locations in Villa Rica. Tanner Medical Center/Villa Rica is a 53-bed acute care hospital located in Villa Rica, Georgia, serving the residents of Carroll, Douglas and Paulding counties and beyond.

== Parks and recreation ==
- Sweetwater Creek State Park is host to the ruins of a Civil War-era mill destroyed in General Sherman's campaign through Georgia.
- Hunter Park is located within the city limits of Douglasville, and it is home to the majority of the sports events held in Douglas County. It is home to the Douglas County Boys and Girls Club.
- Deer Lick Park is located in the northeast corner of the county and is the third-largest park in the county. It is also home to sporting events.
- Woodrow Wilson Park and Lithia Springs Girls Ball Field are located in Lithia Springs next to Sweetwater Creek. The ballfield has flooded during heavy rain storms.
- Boundary Waters Aquatic Center opened in July 2005 in the southeastern section of the county, and it is home to the Douglas County swim team, the Stingrays. The center also provides aquatic therapy and swim lessons to the county's citizens for a low fee. Residents outside the county can use the center as well for a slightly higher fee. Boundary Waters Park features 9 miles of trails open to hikers, joggers, bicyclists and equestrians.

Other parks in the county include:

- Post Road Park
- Clinton Nature Preserve
- Bill Arp Park
- Fairplay Park
- Winston Park
- Mount Carmel Ball Field
- Dog River Park/Reservoir

== Government ==
Most government offices in the county are located at the Douglas County Courthouse complex, about 1-mile (1.6 km) south of the downtown area of Douglasville. The exception is the Douglas County Board of Education, located adjacent to Hunter Park. The Douglas County Chamber of Commerce is located in downtown Douglasville.

The county courthouse was constructed in 1997–98 and opened in 1998 after the county services needed a new courthouse for the ever-growing and changing county. The services prior to the opening were scattered all over downtown Douglasville in seven or eight office buildings. The old Douglas County courthouse, built in 1956, remains in downtown and is now used as a museum and a satellite school for the University of West Georgia an institution of the University System of Georgia with the main campus located in the city of Carrollton in Carroll County, which is included in the Atlanta Metropolitan Area historically, a commercial center for several mostly rural counties in both Georgia and Alabama.

Douglas County is governed by the Douglas County Board of Commissioners with an elected chairman and commissioners from Douglas County's four districts.

=== Politics ===
For elections to the United States House of Representatives, Douglas County is divided between Georgia's 3rd congressional district and Georgia's 6th congressional district.

For elections to the Georgia State Senate, Douglas County is represented by districts 28 and 30. For elections to the Georgia House of Representatives, Douglas County is represented by districts 40, 64 and 66.

In presidential elections, Douglas County had been a reliably Republican county between 1980 and 2004, voting Republican by a double-digit margin even in 1992, when Democrat Bill Clinton carried the state of Georgia. The county gave over 60% of the vote to Republican George W. Bush in both of his presidential runs in 2000 and 2004. The county has since become increasingly Democratic, voting for Democrats since 2008. In 2024, Democrat Kamala Harris won over 65% of the vote, the highest share of the vote in the county since 1976.

United States presidential election results for Douglas County, Georgia
Year	Republican		Democratic		Third party(ies)	
Year	No.	%	No.	%	No.	%
1880	124	20.46%	482	79.54%	0	0.00%
1884	205	30.92%	458	69.08%	0	0.00%
1888	151	23.30%	493	76.08%	4	0.62%
1892	234	19.60%	467	39.11%	493	41.29%
1896	641	57.18%	463	41.30%	17	1.52%
1900	300	40.65%	345	46.75%	93	12.60%
1904	133	20.65%	230	35.71%	281	43.63%
1908	181	34.48%	152	28.95%	192	36.57%
1912	18	3.05%	266	45.01%	307	51.95%
1916	61	10.99%	416	74.95%	78	14.05%
1920	475	52.66%	427	47.34%	0	0.00%
1924	86	14.96%	355	61.74%	134	23.30%
1928	606	57.28%	452	42.72%	0	0.00%
1932	57	5.24%	1,013	93.19%	17	1.56%
1936	237	18.88%	1,015	80.88%	3	0.24%
1940	195	18.88%	833	80.64%	5	0.48%
1944	280	25.27%	828	74.73%	0	0.00%
1948	1,019	30.45%	1,336	39.93%	991	29.62%
1952	645	23.48%	2,102	76.52%	0	0.00%
1956	1,001	32.17%	2,111	67.83%	0	0.00%
1960	1,136	30.60%	2,576	69.40%	0	0.00%
1964	3,315	57.00%	2,501	43.00%	0	0.00%
1968	1,848	25.49%	1,242	17.13%	4,159	57.37%
1972	6,610	87.07%	982	12.93%	0	0.00%
1976	3,959	33.65%	7,805	66.35%	0	0.00%
1980	6,945	48.78%	6,807	47.81%	486	3.41%
1984	12,428	73.98%	4,371	26.02%	0	0.00%
1988	13,493	72.24%	5,086	27.23%	99	0.53%
1992	13,349	50.08%	8,869	33.27%	4,439	16.65%
1996	14,495	54.75%	9,631	36.37%	2,351	8.88%
2000	18,893	61.02%	11,162	36.05%	909	2.94%
2004	25,846	61.36%	15,997	37.98%	281	0.67%
2008	26,812	48.58%	27,825	50.41%	560	1.01%
2012	26,241	47.38%	28,441	51.36%	697	1.26%
2016	24,817	42.70%	31,005	53.34%	2,301	3.96%
2020	25,454	36.82%	42,814	61.92%	871	1.26%
2024	23,996	33.93%	46,240	65.38%	485	0.69%

United States Senate election results for Douglas County, Georgia2
Year	Republican		Democratic		Third party(ies)	
Year	No.	%	No.	%	No.	%
2020	25,002	36.53%	41,796	61.07%	1,643	2.40%
2020	21,970	35.23%	40,398	64.77%	0	0.00%

United States Senate election results for Douglas County, Georgia3
Year	Republican		Democratic		Third party(ies)	
Year	No.	%	No.	%	No.	%
2020	14,011	20.47%	29,454	43.04%	24,976	36.49%
2020	21,743	34.86%	40,630	65.14%	0	0.00%
2022	17,589	33.35%	34,158	64.76%	999	1.89%
2022	16,142	33.25%	32,399	66.75%	0	0.00%

Georgia Gubernatorial election results for Douglas County
Year	Republican		Democratic		Third party(ies)	
Year	No.	%	No.	%	No.	%
2022	19,719	37.25%	32,858	62.08%	353	0.67%

Douglas County is one of nine counties that shifted more than 25 percentage points to the left from 2012 to 2024.

Board of Commissioners
District	Commissioner	Party
CHAIR (at-large)	Dr. Romona Jackson Jones	Democratic
District 1	Henry Mitchell III	Democratic
District 2	Whitney Kenner Jones	Democratic
District 3	Martin Raxton	Democratic
District 4	Mark Alcarez	Republican

=== Law enforcement ===
Douglas County law enforcement is handled by the Douglas County Sheriffs Department. Inside Douglasville city limits, law enforcement is handled by the Douglasville Police Department.

== Education ==
The seal of the Douglas County School System https://dcssga.org

All of the county is served by the Douglas County School System. Based in Douglasville, it operates 20 Elementary Schools, 8 Middle Schools, 5 High Schools, a Performance Learning Center and numerous private academies, as of 2019.

Douglas County (Lithia Springs) is home to a regional academic center of Mercer University, which provides educational programs and extended learning opportunities for working adults. In addition, the county has a campus of West Georgia Technical College, formerly West Central Technical College (main campus in Waco, Georgia); the college provides programs for those seeking higher education in technical fields, as well as adult education and GED classes. The county also is home to Tanner Technical Institute, Strayer University, and Georgia Highlands College.

== Media ==
The newspaper that serves the Douglas County area is the Douglas County Sentinel, a paper that circulates three days a week: Wednesday, Friday and Sunday. The paper has been in circulation since 1902. It now relies on its website for breaking news.

The county also has a secondary paper that circulates on Wednesday, the Douglas Neighbor, a paper that is run by the publisher of the Marietta Daily Journal. This paper is delivered free of charge, supported by advertising.

The county also has a monthly magazine called Chapel Hill News & Views and Villa Rica News & Views that delivers to 39,000 homes and businesses ranging from Villa Rica to Lithia Springs and everywhere in between. It also includes a local yellow pages. The company's website covers a wide range of local information as well.

The county is also well-served by online media. Home Rule News launched in 2009 and covers Douglas County as part of its Greater West Metro Atlanta territory. All On Georgia-Douglas which is the newest and fastest growing digital news outlet in the county. Douglasville Patch launched in 2010 and focuses on countywide news and extensive crime coverage. The Douglasville Menu launched in 2015 and focuses on the retail, economic and development news of the city and county with some community and events news as well. The Douglasville Menu is part of The City Menus which began solely as The Carrollton Menu.

The Atlanta Journal-Constitution also serves readers of Douglas County, seven days a week, with its largest paper on Sunday.

Douglas County is served by the Atlanta television market, but has a small information TV channel on cable, DCTV 23. The station broadcasts board meetings and special events, classified job listings, and original shows: Gesundheit, Douglas County Living, Insights, District Dialogue, Legally Speaking, dctv23 Presents, Storytime at the Library, Pet Pause, and the "Friday Night Drive-in Movie".

== Transportation ==
=== Major highways ===
- I-20 / SR 402 (unsigned)
- US 78 / SR 8
  - SR 8 Conn.
- US 278
- SR 5
- SR 6
- SR 61
- SR 70
- SR 92
- SR 154
- SR 166

=== Other roads ===
- Lee Road: Runs through the eastern portion of the county in the Lithia Springs area. The road intersects I-20, begins at Fairburn Road (State Highway 92) in the south and terminates at S. Sweetwater Rd north of I-20.
- Post Road: Runs through the western portion of Douglas County through the Winston area. The road begins at the southern border with Carroll County, and runs north, intersects I-20 and ends at Bankhead Highway (US Route 78).
- Chapel Hill Road: begins at I-20 (road continues north as Campbellton St.) and runs south to Dorsett Shoals Road, ending at SR 166.
- Douglas Boulevard runs from Chapel Hill Rd. at I-20 to SR 5 (Bill Arp Rd.), and from there to Bright Star Road. This road passes Douglasville's Arbor Place Mall.
- Kings Highway runs south from SR 5 to Big A Road, and is host to many residential developments.
- Pope Road runs south, southeast looping from the Midway area of Fairburn Rd.(SR 92) and ends at Annewakee Rd.
- Annewakee Road runs south from Chapel Hill Rd. at Dorsett Shoals Rd. and ending at Fairburn Rd.(SR 92) and Pope Rd.
- Dorsett Shoals Road runs west from Chapel Hill Rd. at Annewakee Rd. to SR 5.
- Capps Ferry Road (a future state route) runs from the end of South Fulton Parkway to S.R. 166 connecting southern Douglas County to Atlanta.

=== Pedestrians and cycling ===
- Douglasville Running Trail
- Sweetwater Creek Park Trail
- Water Lily Dr
- Boundary Waters Park Trails

=== Rail ===
Historically, the Southern Railway ran several daily passenger trains, including the Kansas City-Florida Special, the Sunnyland and an Atlanta-Birmingham section of the Piedmont Limited, making flag or signal stops in Austell and Douglasville. The last trains made stops in 1967. Today, the nearest passenger service is Amtrak's Crescent in Atlanta, 21 miles east of Lithia Springs.

== In popular culture ==
- The county has become a hub for the film industry, serving as some of the state's most popular filming locations. Projects that have filmed exclusively in, or in part of, Douglas County include the Academy Award-winning Driving Miss Daisy, Smokey and the Bandit, Six Pack, Randy and the Mob, Zombieland, Killers, Killing Season, The Hunger Games: Catching Fire, The Founder, The Hunger Games: Mockingjay - Part I, Million Dollar Arm, Kill the Messenger, All Eyez on Me, Logan Lucky, Table 19, and The House with a Clock in Its Walls.
- Television series to film in the county include The Walking Dead, Necessary Roughness, Stranger Things, Matlock (TV series), Finding Carter, MacGyver, Stan Against Evil, and MTV's Scream.

== See also ==
- National Register of Historic Places listings in Douglas County, Georgia
- List of counties in Georgia
