= White City, Georgia =

Unincorporated community in Georgia, U.S.

Coordinates: 33.7311°N 84.8044°W

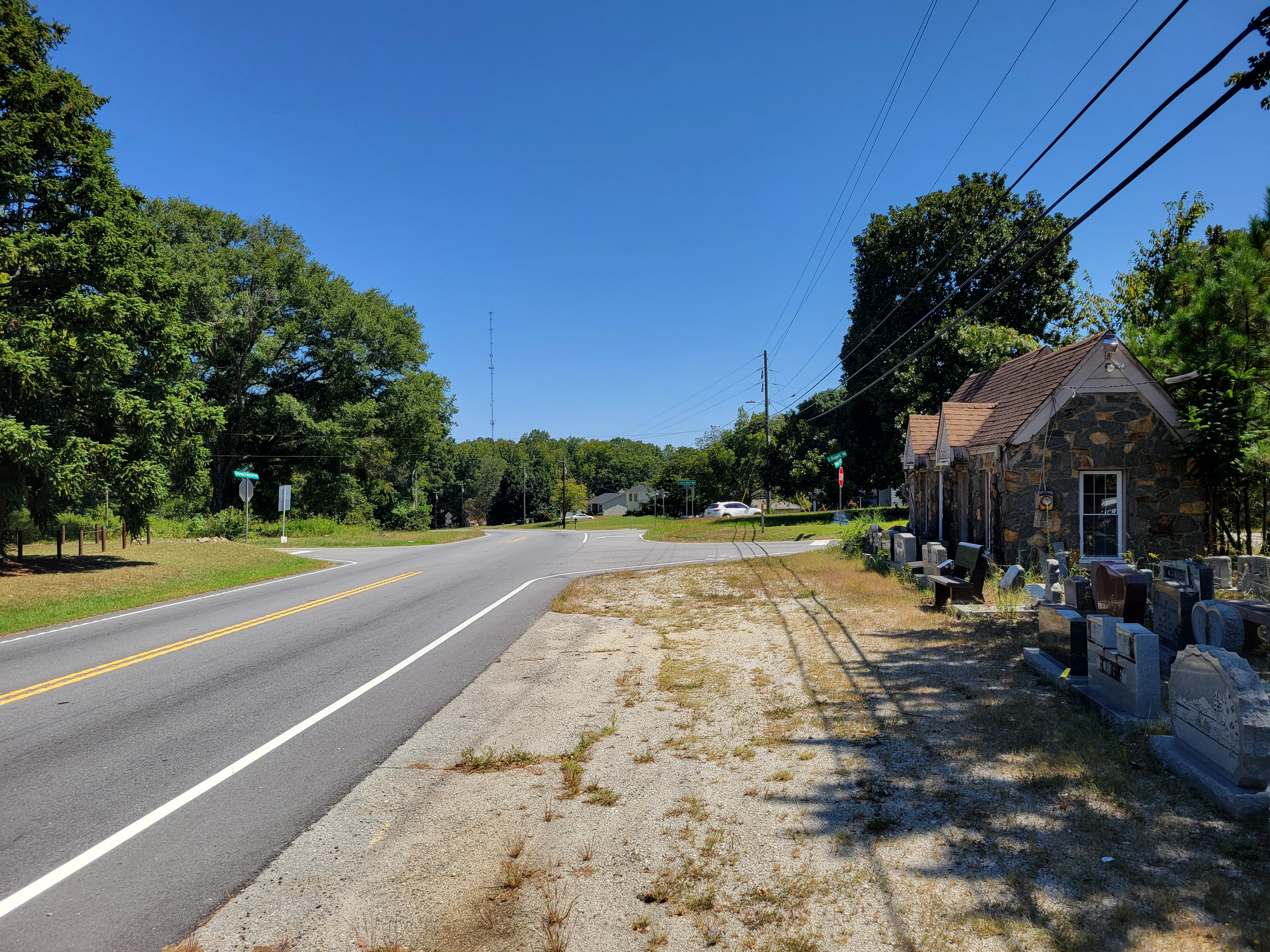
Veterans Memorial Highway

White City is an unincorporated community in Douglas County, Georgia, United States.

== Nearby communities ==
The nearby communities are Douglasville and Winston.
