= Hannah, Georgia =

Unincorporated community in Georgia, U.S.

Coordinates: 33°35′13″N 84°51′49″W

Hannah is an unincorporated community in southern Douglas County, Georgia, United States.

== Nearby community ==
The nearby community is Fairplay.
