= McWhorter, Georgia =

Unincorporated community in Georgia, U.S.

Coordinates: 33°36′47″N 84°50′12″W

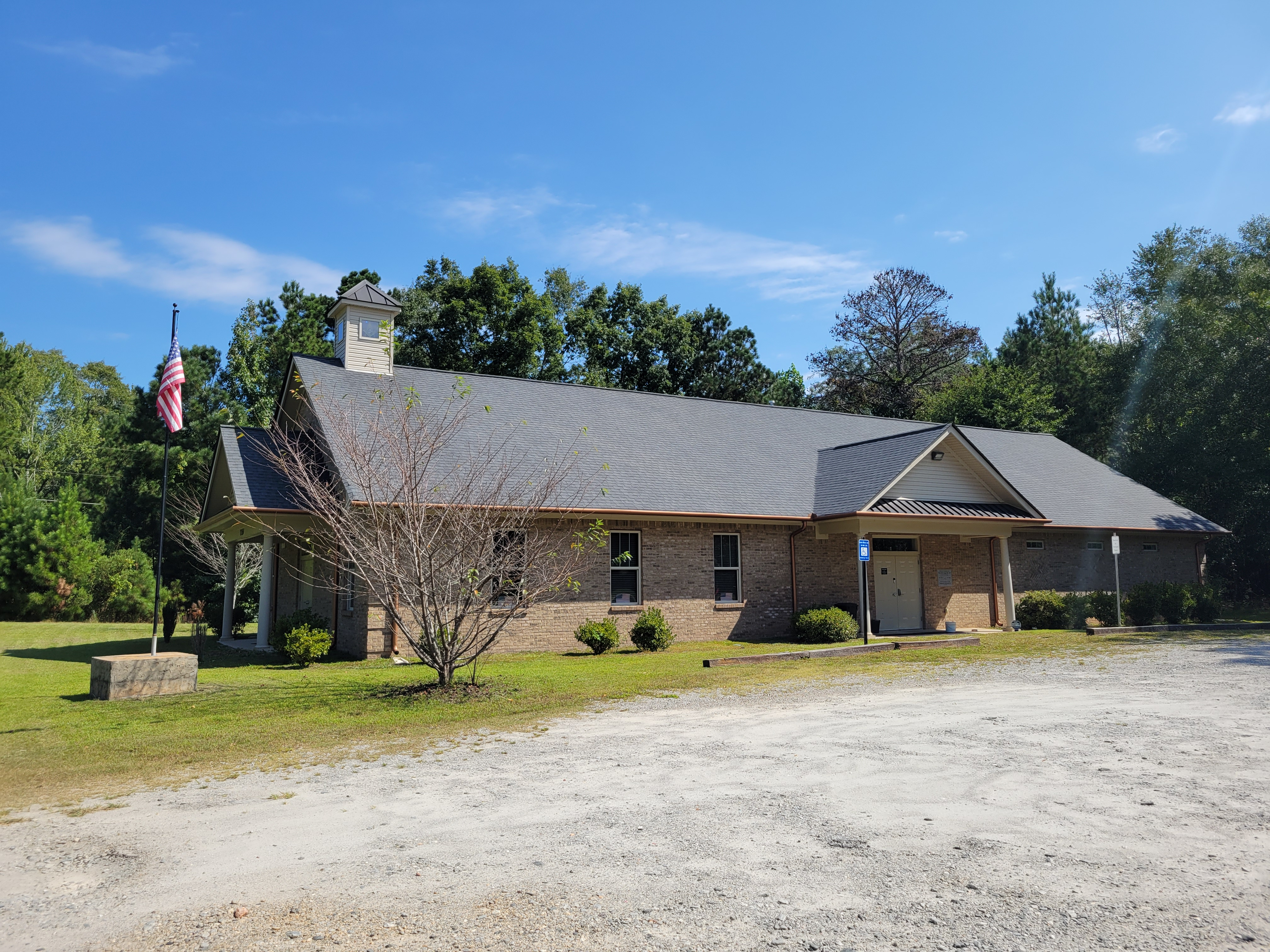
Flint Hill Masonic Lodge No. 371

McWhorter is an unincorporated community in southern Douglas County, Georgia, United States.

== Nearby communities ==
The nearby community is Fairplay.
