= Arbor Place =

Shopping mall in Douglasville, Georgia, U.S.

Arbor Place Mall

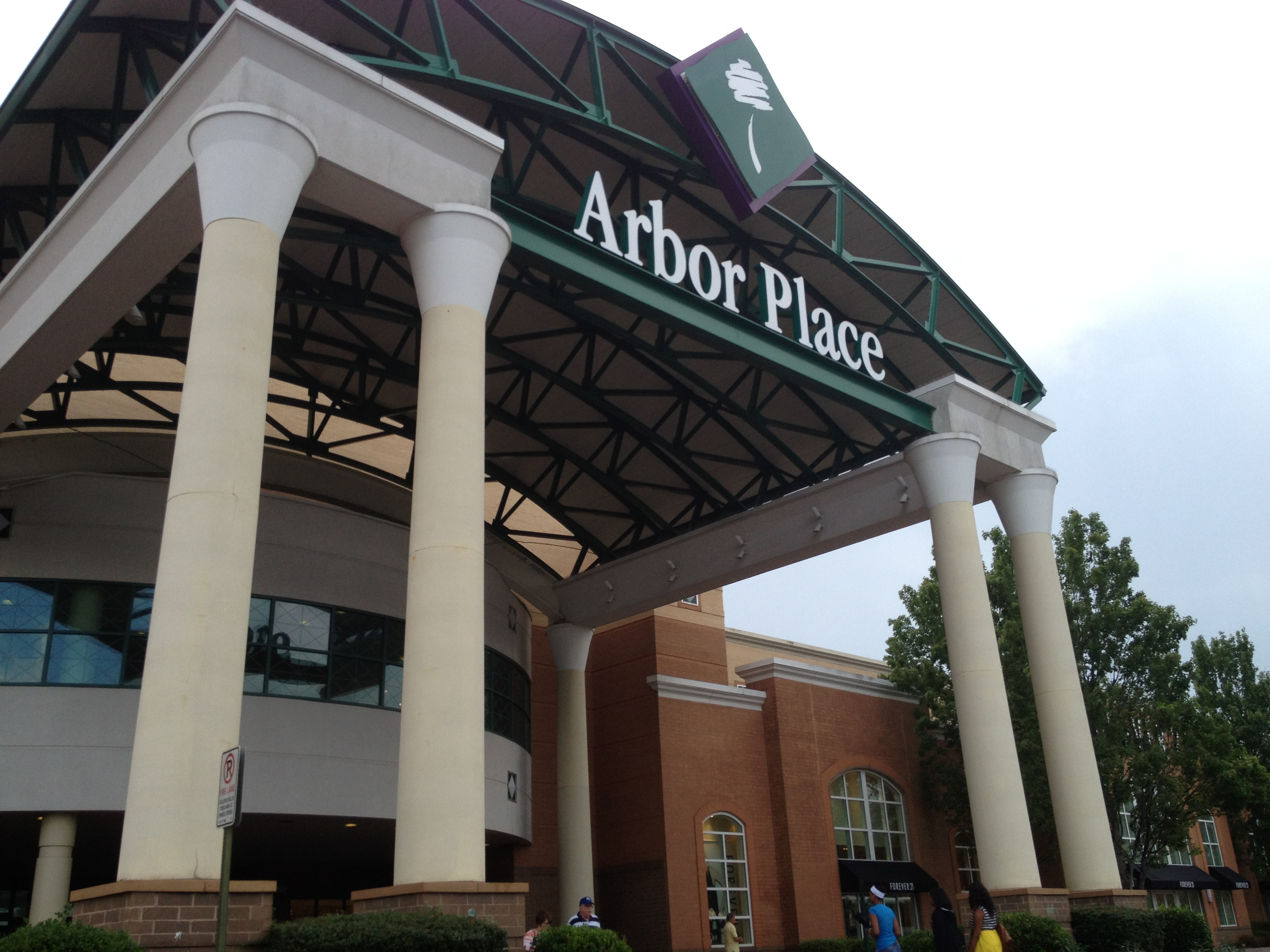
- Entrance to Arbor Place Mall, July 2012
- Location: Douglasville, Georgia, United States
- Coordinates: 33.728250°N 84.745850°W
- Address: 6700 Douglas Boulevard
- Opened: October 13, 1999; 27 years ago
- Developer: CBL & Associates Properties
- Manager: CBL Properties
- Owner: CBL Properties
- Num. of stores: 140
- Num. of anchor tenants: 6 (5 open, 1 vacant)
- Floor area: 1,176,454 sq ft (109,296 m^{2})
- Floors: 2 (1 in Belk Outlet)
- Parking: 6,000+
- Website: arborplace.com

Arbor Place is a shopping mall in Douglasville, Georgia, United States. Opened in 1999, the mall's anchors are Macy's, Dillard's, JCPenney, Belk Outlet and Regal Cinemas. Junior anchors are Old Navy and Planet Fitness.

== History ==
Arbor Place was developed in 1999 by CBL & Associates Properties (now CBL Properties). Upon opening, the mall featured over 1,000,000 square feet (93,000 m^{2}) of retail space. The original anchor stores were Bed Bath & Beyond, Old Navy, Parisian, Sears, and Borders Books & Music. An additional space was built for Uptons, but the chain went out of business before the mall opened. Arbor Place was the first retail development in Douglas County, Georgia. The unopened Uptons became a home furnishings store called Dekor in 2001, but this store liquidated after only a few months in operation. A year later, Rich's was added as well. JCPenney joined the mall in 2003, taking the place of Dekor.

On November 7, 2019, it was announced that the Sears anchor store would close. Conn's HomePlus opened on the first floor of the former Sears in 2023.

In December 2020, Bed Bath & Beyond closed. Planet Fitness opened in its spot in December 2024.

In February 2023, Belk began converting its anchor store into a 1-floor Belk Outlet, which opened on April 8, 2023.

In April 2024, Conn's Home Plus filed for bankruptcy and closed its anchor store.
