= Douglasville, Georgia =

Douglasville
- City
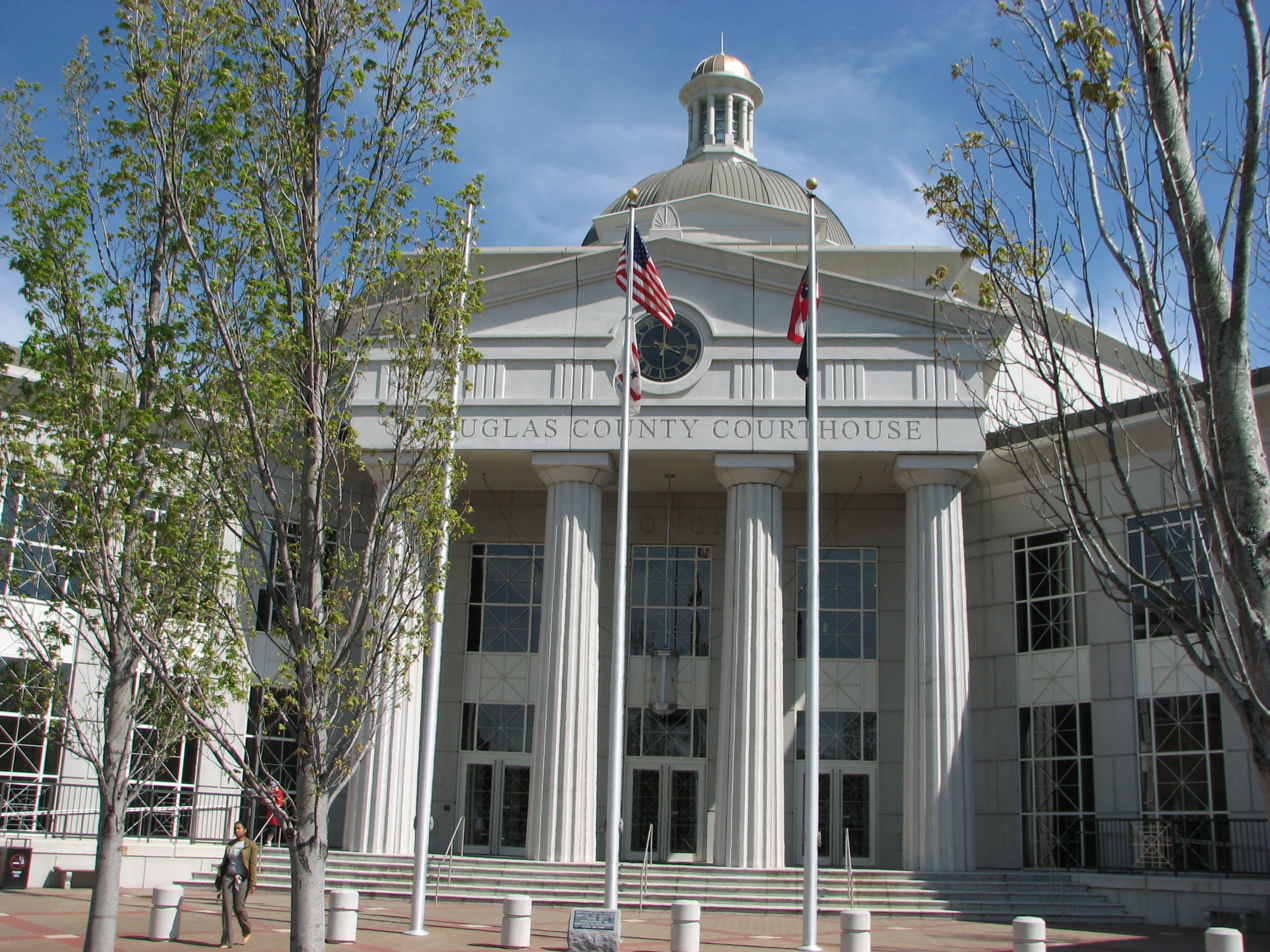
- Douglas County Courthouse

- Flag Seal
- Motto(s): "New Growth, Old Charm, Always Home"
- Interactive map of Douglasville
- Coordinates: 33°45′05″N 84°44′52″W
- Country: United States
- State: Georgia
- County: Douglas

Government
  - Mayor: Rochelle Robinson
  - City Manager: Marcia Hampton
  - Director: Farshad Marvasti

Area
  - Total: 23.03 sq mi (59.66 km^{2})
  - Land: 22.93 sq mi (59.39 km^{2})
  - Water: 0.11 sq mi (0.28 km^{2})
- Elevation: 1,201 ft (366 m)

Population (2020)
  - Total: 34,650
  - Density: 1,511.2/sq mi (583.47/km^{2})
- Time zone: UTC−5 (EST)
  - Summer (DST): UTC−4 (EDT)
- ZIP Codes: 30122, 30133-30135. 30154
- Area codes: 770/678/470
- FIPS code: 13-23900
- GNIS feature ID: 0355535
- Website: douglasvillega.gov

Douglasville is the largest city and the county seat of Douglas County, Georgia, United States. As of the 2020 census, the city had a population of 34,650, up from 30,961 in 2010 and 20,065 in 2000.

Douglasville is located approximately 20 miles (32 km) west of Atlanta and is part of the Atlanta metro area. Highway access can be obtained via three interchanges along Interstate 20.

== History ==
Prior to its founding, the site that would become Douglasville was originally located on a natural rise in the topography where a chestnut tree stripped of its bark was used as a landmark. This gave the area the early moniker of "Skint Chestnut." By 1800, the primary native peoples inhabiting the area were the Muscogee and Cherokee. Due to the influx of white settlers during the Georgia Gold Rush, the amount of squatters on native land greatly strained tensions in the community and, eventually, all of the local natives would be forcibly relocated as a result of the Indian Removal Act.

Douglasville was founded in 1874 as the railroad was constructed in the area. That same year, Douglasville was designated as the county seat of the recently formed Douglas County. The community was named for Senator Stephen A. Douglas of Illinois.

Georgia General Assembly first incorporated Douglasville in 1875.

On September 21, 2009, Douglas County was devastated by the second worst flood in Georgia history (the first being the failure of the Kelly Barnes Dam in 1977). Over 18 inches (457 mm) of rain fell in one night, destroying many roads and homes. The county was later declared a disaster area, and the governor of Georgia declared a state of emergency. The flooding most affected the areas of Douglasville, Villa Rica, Austell, Lithia Springs, and Chapel Hill. The disaster killed more than eight people in the county, most of them in the Douglasville area.

== Geography ==
Douglasville is located in north-central Douglas County. Lithia Springs is 6 miles (10 km) to the northeast along U.S. Route 78, and Villa Rica is 10 miles (16 km) to the west. Hiram is 9 miles (14 km) to the north via SR 92. Interstate 20 passes south of downtown, leading east 22 miles (35 km) to downtown Atlanta and west 125 miles (201 km) to Birmingham, Alabama. I-20 provides access to the city from exits 34, 36, and 37.

According to the United States Census Bureau, Douglasville has a total area of 22.6 square miles (58.5 km^{2}), of which 22.5 square miles (58.2 km^{2}) is land and 0.1 square miles (0.3 km^{2}), or 0.58%, is water.

Douglasville has an elevation of 1,209 ft (369 m) above sea level.

== Demographics ==
Historical population
Census	Pop.	Note	%±
1880	286		—
1890	863		201.7%
1900	1,140		32.1%
1910	1,462		28.2%
1920	2,159		47.7%
1930	2,316		7.3%
1940	2,555		10.3%
1950	3,400		33.1%
1960	4,462		31.2%
1970	5,472		22.6%
1980	7,641		39.6%
1990	11,635		52.3%
2000	20,065		72.5%
2010	30,961		54.3%
2020	34,650		11.9%
2025 (est.)	41,532	▲	19.9%
U.S. Decennial Census; 1850-1870 1870-1880; 1890-1910 1920-1930; 1940 1950 1960; 1970 1980 1990; 2000 2010 2020; 2025

=== Racial and ethnic composition ===
Douglasville city, Georgia – Racial and ethnic composition Note: the US Census treats Hispanic/Latino as an ethnic category. This table excludes Latinos from the racial categories and assigns them to a separate category. Hispanics/Latinos may be of any race.
Race / Ethnicity (NH = Non-Hispanic)	Pop 2000	Pop 2010	Pop 2020	% 2000	% 2010	% 2020
White alone (NH)	12,425	10,331	6,962	61.92%	33.37%	20.09%
Black or African American alone (NH)	6,054	17,031	22,207	30.17%	55.01%	64.09%
Native American or Alaska Native alone (NH)	56	65	87	0.28%	0.21%	0.25%
Asian alone (NH)	346	554	633	1.72%	1.79%	1.83%
Native Hawaiian or Pacific Islander alone (NH)	3	15	23	0.01%	0.05%	0.07%
Other race alone (NH)	27	75	303	0.13%	0.24%	0.87%
Mixed race or Multiracial (NH)	354	647	1,291	1.76%	2.09%	3.73%
Hispanic or Latino (any race)	800	2,243	3,144	3.99%	7.24%	9.07%
Total	20,065	30,961	34,650	100.00%	100.00%	100.00%

=== 2020 census ===
As of the 2020 census, there were 34,650 people, 12,907 households, and 7,833 families residing in the city.

The median age was 35.3 years. 25.4% of residents were under the age of 18 and 10.3% of residents were 65 years of age or older. For every 100 females there were 86.3 males, and for every 100 females age 18 and over there were 81.5 males age 18 and over.

99.2% of residents lived in urban areas, while 0.8% lived in rural areas.

Of the 12,907 households, 37.7% had children under the age of 18 living in them. Of all households, 37.0% were married-couple households, 17.7% were households with a male householder and no spouse or partner present, and 38.8% were households with a female householder and no spouse or partner present. About 28.1% of all households were made up of individuals and 7.0% had someone living alone who was 65 years of age or older.

There were 13,671 housing units, of which 5.6% were vacant. The homeowner vacancy rate was 2.1% and the rental vacancy rate was 6.0%.

Racial composition as of the 2020 census
Race	Number	Percent
White	7,459	21.5%
Black or African American	22,585	65.2%
American Indian and Alaska Native	145	0.4%
Asian	650	1.9%
Native Hawaiian and Other Pacific Islander	26	0.1%
Some other race	1,582	4.6%
Two or more races	2,203	6.4%
Hispanic or Latino (of any race)	3,144	9.1%

== Economy ==
The historic Downtown hosts many shops and eateries. A vibrant business area in Douglasville is located south of the city between Chapel Hill Road and Georgia State Route 5, around the Douglas Boulevard Corridor. Arbor Place Mall is located in this area, as are many major retail stores and fast food chains.

The Fairburn Road area also hosts many shops, food stores and fast food spots. Some vacated to make way for an expansion of the highway in early 2008. Expansion is aided by the Douglasville Development Authority (described below).

In recent years, the historic downtown district and surrounding areas have become favorite backdrops for the film industry. Productions include Netflix's Stranger Things (2016), The Founder (2015), Mocking Jay Part 1 (2014), Catching Fire (2013), Finding Carter (MTV series 2014), and Kill the Messenger (2014).

=== Top employers ===
According to Douglasville's 2023 Annual Comprehensive Financial Report, the top employers in the city were:

#	Employer	# of employees
1	American Red Cross	732
2	Home Chef	729
3	Walmart	634
4	Medline	495
5	Resia Construction, LLC	450
6	Baldwin Paving Co., Inc.	435
7	Kehe Distributors, LLC	419
8	TDR Contracters, Inc.	300
9	Amazon.com Services, LLC	299
10	Alamon, Inc	225

The Douglasville ACFR table of principal employers does not show public employees. The Douglas County School System currently employs over 3,550 people, including teachers, administrators, and support staff.

== Arts and culture ==
=== Points of interest ===
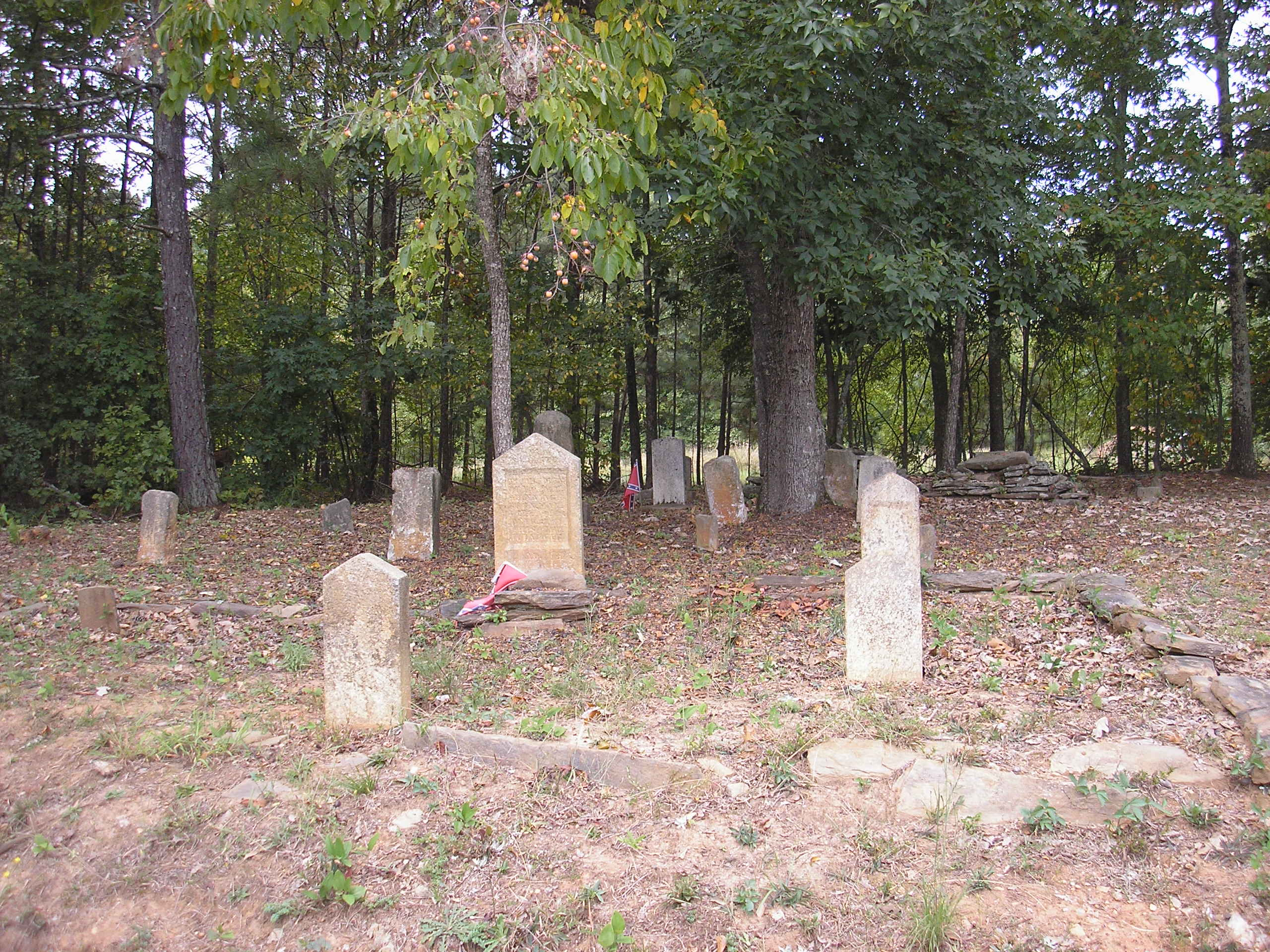
The Chapman Family Cemetery is a White burial area, located near the Basket Creek Cemetery, including are Civil War soldiers' graves and one Native American grave (several rocks are piled on top located in the back)

The Central Business District is listed on the National Register of Historic Places as a historic district. The buildings' styles include Romanesque, Italianate, and Queen Anne.

In the center of town is a small plaza, which was converted from a street block, known as O'Neal Plaza (named after the former O'Neal's department store, now used as the Douglasville City Hall). The plaza features a small performance venue and concrete fountain. It is home to many festivals year round. This is the site of the annual Christmas Tree Lighting Festival.

- The Douglasville Convention & Visitors Bureau is located in the heart of downtown and serves as the city's welcome center.
- The Douglas County Cultural Arts Center is located at Campbellton Street, south of Downtown. The center holds art shows and special events throughout the year, and hosts events for schools across the county. Classes for a variety of visual and performing arts are available year-round for all ages.
- The courthouse on Hospital Drive hosts the Douglasville Farmers and Artisans Market every Wednesday from 4 pm until 7 pm, from April until November.
- The Douglasville Downtown Conference Center is located at 6701 Church Street. It hosts corporate meetings, community events, and social gatherings. Summit Church of West Georgia meets here on Sunday mornings. The 37,000-square-foot (3,400 m^{2}) conference center, with a two-level, 300-space parking deck, opened in early 2013. It has a 7,600-foot (2,300 m) ballroom space that can be divided into five rooms. It includes a 150-seat auditorium, a 15-person boardroom, a business center, three meeting rooms, two pre-function spaces, bride and groom dressing rooms, and a terrace in the back.
- The Douglas County Museum of History and Art on West Broad Street is housed in the county's historic 1956 courthouse, which has been preserved for its unique mid-century modern architecture and is listed in the National Register for Historic Places. The museum features an exhibit of county history as well as seasonal displays.
- Arbor Place Mall sponsors many festivals, as well as Douglasville's July 4 celebrations.

== Parks and recreation ==
- Hunter Park is Douglasville's largest park, and is home to the county Boys & Girls Club. Many festivals, sports activities, and recreational activities take place here. The park features a playground, wildlife pond and trail, seven tennis courts, 11 baseball/softball fields, including one designed for the handicapped, and an 18-hole disc golf course that opened in 2015. The small train for children that operated during the summer no longer exists, but the track for the train still remains. The park is named after the late 1st Lt. "Jerry" Hunter (USAF), Douglas County's first casualty of the Vietnam War.
- Boundary Waters Park, located on GA Highway 92 North/Highway 166 East, has several pools which are open to the public. The Boundary Waters Aquatic Center features an eight-lane, 25-yard heated competition pool and a four-lane, heated therapeutic/teaching pool. The center is home to the Douglas County Stingrays swim team as well as local high school and Special Olympics swim teams. The park complex includes an array of ball fields, walking and horseriding trails, and an 18-hole disc golf course In late 2021, the new Boundary Waters Activity Center opened up in the park. The new facility has two basketball courts, an indoor walking track, and a fitness room.
- Deer Lick Park is located approximately 3 miles (5 km) south of Interstate 20 and east of the city limits on Mack Road. This 66-acre park features softball fields, a sand volleyball court, an 18-hole disc golf course, tennis courts, a gymnasium, and batting cages. It also hosts a three-acre fishing lake with a pier, playground, an amphitheater, gazebo, group shelters, and restroom facilities.
- The West Pines Golf Club was purchased by the city in 2003 and is now operated as a public course.
- The Fowler Field Soccer Complex is located in the southwest part of the city, on Chapel Hill Road.
- The Chestnut Log Soccer Complex is located on Pope Road beside Chestnut Log Middle School, about ½ mile west of SR 92 (Fairburn Road).
- Jesse Davis Park is located north of downtown Douglasville and serves as a neighborhood park for residents of North Douglasville. The park was recently renovated, and has a playground and a community swimming pool.
- Sweetwater Creek State Park is a 2,549-acre (10.32 km^{2}) park 7 miles (11 km) east of Douglasville. The park has 9 miles (14 km) of wooded trails that follow the stream to the ruins of the New Manchester Manufacturing Company, a textile mill burned during the Civil War. The park has a 215-acre (0.87 km^{2}) lake with two fishing docks, canoe and fishing boat rentals, 11 picnic shelters, playground, visitors center and museum.
- Clinton Nature Preserve located 7 miles (11 km) west of Douglasville, is a 200-acre historical preserve, located off the Post Road exit of Interstate 20, which features a pre-Civil War log cabin, picnic areas, walking and mountain biking trails, a gravel walking track, fishing, an outdoor amphitheatre, and a 100-percent disabled-accessible children's play garden.

== Government ==
In 2015, the city elected Rochelle Robinson as its first female and first African American mayor.

The City Council is elected from single-member districts.

=== Law enforcement ===
The Douglasville police chief is Gary Sparks. The Douglasville Police Department is located at 2083 Fairburn Road. The sheriff is Tim Pounds, and the Douglas County Sheriff's Office is located at 8470 Earl D Lee Boulevard in Douglasville.

== Education ==
Education in Douglasville is varied, with a large public school system and many private schools. The Douglas County School District operates 21 elementary schools, eight middle schools, and five high schools, covering grades pre-K to 12th grade.

Douglasville hosts a campus ("instructional site") of Georgia Highlands College. Nearby universities and colleges include Strayer College, West Georgia Technical College, and Mercer University.

Douglasville has numerous secular and religious private schools, including:

- Harvester Christian Academy
- Heirway Christian Academy
- The International Montessori Academy
- The Kings Way Christian School
- Primrose School at Brookmont
- Saint Rose Academy
- Sunbrook Academy at Chapel Hill
- Chapelhill Christian School

== Media ==
Douglasville is served by the Douglas County Sentinel, a three-day-a-week publication that covers local and state news and by All On Georgia - Douglas, a hyperlocal digital news organization that covers local, state and national news, daily. Chapel Hill News & Views also serves Douglasville as a monthly magazine with 45,000 circulation.

== Infrastructure ==
=== Transportation ===
- U.S. Highway 78 (State Route 8, Veterans' Memorial Highway) runs directly east to west through downtown Douglasville.
- State Route 92 runs north to southeast just ¼ of a mile to the east of downtown as a truck route designed to keep large trucks from crossing an elevated railroad crossing at Campbellton Street. The city and the Georgia DOT are working on plans to reroute Highway 92 farther east of downtown on a four-lane bridge serving as a bypass.
- State Route 5 is colocated with US 78 through downtown east to the Cobb County line and west just past Hunter Park. Highway 5 continues in a southwesterly direction through the village of Bill Arp and crosses into Carroll County near Whitesburg.
- Interstate 20 (Ga Hwy 402) extends roughly east to west about 1.5 miles (2.4 km) south of downtown, with access from Exits 34, 36, and 37.

Douglasville is home to the single-runway Pinewood Airport, located 5.7 miles (9.2 km) northwest of downtown.

Historically, the Southern Railway ran several daily passenger trains, including the Kansas City-Florida Special, the Sunnyland and an Atlanta-Birmingham section of the Piedmont Limited, making flag or signal stops in Douglasville. The last trains made stops in 1967. Today, the nearest passenger service is Amtrak's Crescent in Atlanta, 26.4 miles to the east.

=== Healthcare ===
Residents of Douglasville are served by the Wellstar Douglas Hospital located at 8954 Hospital Drive.

== Douglasville Development Authority ==
The primary goals of the City of Douglasville Development Authority (CDDA) are to promote the economic prosperity of the city while simultaneously increasing the existing industry and business sectors in order to raise the quality of life for the city's residents. The City Development Authority also focuses on education in order successfully promote the labor force.

In the fall of 2009, an area of interest for the CDDA was the reconstruction and widening of Highway 92, which runs through the heart of the city. This major roadway reconstruction was expected to have a significant impact on the city and its ability to promote economic development.

== Notable people ==
- George Bello, soccer player
- Josh Buice, pastor who pastors a church in Douglasville, and is also the Founder and current President of a Christian ministry organization that holds one of the largest evangelical conferences, which had originally begun in Douglasville
- Gigi Dolin, professional wrestler
- Asia Durr, WNBA player for the Atlanta Dream
- Janie Lou Gibbs, serial killer and poisoner, died in a nursing home after being diagnosed with Parkinson's disease after being released from prison
- Walton Goggins, actor best known for his role as Boyd Crowder in Justified. Though he was born in Birmingham, Alabama, his family relocated to Douglasville for his formative years. He eventually graduated from Lithia Springs High School
- Terry Harper, former outfielder for the Atlanta Braves
- Brian Heidik, winner of Survivor: Thailand
- Bill Hembree, politician from Georgia
- Macey Hodge, soccer player
- Norma Jean, metalcore band
- Mason Massey, racing driver
- Megan Moroney, country singer-songwriter
- Justin Shipley, racing driver
- Elana Meyers Taylor, Olympic gold medalist bobsledder
