= 1976 United States presidential election in Georgia =

- November 2, 1976

Nominee	Jimmy Carter	Gerald Ford
Party	Democratic	Republican
Home state	Georgia	Michigan
Running mate	Walter Mondale	Bob Dole
Electoral vote	12	0
Popular vote	979,409	483,743
Percentage	66.74%	32.96%
County results
Carter
50–60%
60–70%
70–80%
80–90%
President before election
Gerald Ford
Republican
Elected President
Jimmy Carter
Democratic

The 1976 United States presidential election in Georgia was held on November 2, 1976. The Democratic candidate, former Governor of Georgia Jimmy Carter, overwhelmingly won his home state with 66.74% of the vote ahead of the Republican Party nominee, incumbent President Gerald Ford, giving him the state's 12 electoral votes. Carter carried all of Georgia's 159 counties (the last time any presidential candidate has won every single county in the state) and 10 congressional districts by wide margins.

This is the only presidential election in Georgia's history where the Democratic candidate carried all of Georgia's counties, despite the state's long Democratic streak, which had ended only in 1964. Even though Carter's percentage of the vote was lower than that of several previous Democratic victors in the state, such as Woodrow Wilson, James M. Cox, John W. Davis, and Franklin D. Roosevelt, none of these had carried every county in the state. In particular, Carter remains the only Democrat to carry historically pro-Union, East Tennessee-oriented Fannin County since 1912, and the only Democrat to obtain a majority of the vote there since William Jennings Bryan in 1900. There are a further seven counties, in addition to Fannin, that have never voted Democratic again since 1976: Dade, Walker, Catoosa, Fayette, Columbia, Lee and Lowndes. Douglas and Rockdale counties would not vote Democratic for president again until 2008, and Cobb and Gwinnett would not do so until 2016.

The election represented a complete flip from the previous election when President Richard Nixon also won Georgia with 75% of the vote and carried every county. Georgia swung 84 points Democratic, the largest partisan swing of any state in 1976.

Ford did carry one of Georgia's 161 historical counties, with the former Milton County backing the incumbent president 51.1%–48.9%. In fact, Ford carried many precincts in northern Fulton and DeKalb Counties, some by landslide margins. For example, one precinct in Dunwoody voted for Ford by a margin of 1245 to 500.

Among white voters, 58% supported Carter while 42% supported Ford.

== Results ==
United States presidential election in Georgia, 1976
Party	Candidate	Votes	Percentage	Electoral votes
Democratic	James Carter	979,409	66.74%	12
Republican	Gerald Ford (incumbent)	483,743	32.96%	0
Write-in	Thomas J. Anderson	1,168	0.08%	0
Write-in	Lester Maddox	1,071	0.07%	0
Write-in	Eugene McCarthy	991	0.07%	0
Write-in	Write-ins (scattered)	847	0.06%	0
Write-in	Roger MacBride	175	0.01%	0
Write-in	Peter Camejo	43	0.00%	0
Write-in	Gus Hall	3	0.00%	0
Write-in	Ernest Miller	3	0.00%	0
Write-in	Julius Levin	2	0.00%	0
Write-in	Frank Zeidler	2	0.00%	0
Write-in	Lyndon LaRouche	1	0.00%	0
Totals		1,467,458	100.00%	12
Voter turnout		42%		—

=== Results by county ===
County	Jimmy Carter Democratic		Gerald Ford Republican		Margin		Total votes cast (Note: County counts exclude a total of 4,306 write-in votes as these were not tabulated by county.)
County	#	%	#	%	#	%	Total votes cast
Appling	3,585	78.86%	961	21.14%	2,624	57.72%	4,546
Atkinson	1,560	81.80%	347	18.20%	1,213	63.60%	1,907
Bacon	2,395	80.13%	594	19.87%	1,801	60.26%	2,989
Baker	1,162	79.21%	305	20.79%	857	58.42%	1,467
Baldwin	4,674	56.41%	3,612	43.59%	1,062	12.82%	8,286
Banks	2,387	87.85%	330	12.15%	2,057	73.70%	2,717
Barrow	4,756	77.71%	1,364	22.29%	3,392	55.42%	6,120
Bartow	8,166	81.32%	1,876	18.68%	6,290	62.64%	10,042
Ben Hill	2,449	75.05%	814	24.95%	1,635	50.10%	3,263
Berrien	3,394	85.95%	555	14.05%	2,839	71.90%	3,949
Bibb	31,902	71.34%	12,819	28.66%	19,083	42.68%	44,721
Bleckley	2,605	72.83%	972	27.17%	1,633	45.66%	3,577
Brantley	2,294	86.50%	358	13.50%	1,936	73.00%	2,652
Brooks	2,653	70.65%	1,102	29.35%	1,551	41.30%	3,755
Bryan	2,045	72.88%	761	27.12%	1,284	45.76%	2,806
Bulloch	5,199	62.23%	3,156	37.77%	2,043	24.46%	8,355
Burke	3,014	65.82%	1,565	34.18%	1,449	31.64%	4,579
Butts	2,898	77.97%	819	22.03%	2,079	55.94%	3,717
Calhoun	1,394	76.17%	436	23.83%	958	52.34%	1,830
Camden	2,962	74.85%	995	25.15%	1,967	49.70%	3,957
Candler	1,388	68.24%	646	31.76%	742	36.48%	2,034
Carroll	10,050	73.41%	3,640	26.59%	6,410	46.82%	13,690
Catoosa	6,020	61.31%	3,799	38.69%	2,221	22.62%	9,819
Charlton	1,750	79.47%	452	20.53%	1,298	58.94%	2,202
Chatham	32,075	57.04%	24,160	42.96%	7,915	14.08%	56,235
Chattahoochee	506	73.98%	178	26.02%	328	47.96%	684
Chattooga	4,686	81.17%	1,087	18.83%	3,599	62.34%	5,773
Cherokee	6,539	71.48%	2,609	28.52%	3,930	42.96%	9,148
Clarke	11,342	63.18%	6,610	36.82%	4,732	26.36%	17,952
Clay	947	76.25%	295	23.75%	652	52.50%	1,242
Clayton	21,432	62.42%	12,905	37.58%	8,527	24.84%	34,337
Clinch	1,414	78.69%	383	21.31%	1,031	57.38%	1,797
Cobb	45,002	56.73%	34,324	43.27%	10,678	12.46%	79,326
Coffee	4,601	76.45%	1,417	23.55%	3,184	52.90%	6,018
Colquitt	6,928	76.06%	2,181	23.94%	4,747	52.12%	9,109
Columbia	4,674	57.73%	3,423	42.27%	1,251	15.46%	8,097
Cook	2,882	81.14%	670	18.86%	2,212	62.28%	3,552
Coweta	6,195	67.05%	3,044	32.95%	3,151	34.10%	9,239
Crawford	1,842	82.97%	378	17.03%	1,464	65.94%	2,220
Crisp	3,747	73.83%	1,328	26.17%	2,419	47.66%	5,075
Dade	2,263	61.98%	1,388	38.02%	875	23.96%	3,651
Dawson	1,384	78.91%	370	21.09%	1,014	57.82%	1,754
Decatur	3,736	59.91%	2,500	40.09%	1,236	19.82%	6,236
DeKalb	86,872	56.40%	67,160	43.60%	19,712	12.80%	154,032
Dodge	5,267	86.13%	848	13.87%	4,419	72.26%	6,115
Dooly	2,441	78.84%	655	21.16%	1,786	57.68%	3,096
Dougherty	11,461	55.11%	9,337	44.89%	2,124	10.22%	20,798
Douglas	7,805	66.35%	3,959	33.65%	3,846	32.70%	11,764
Early	2,405	67.52%	1,157	32.48%	1,248	35.04%	3,562
Echols	585	84.05%	111	15.95%	474	68.10%	696
Effingham	2,906	63.73%	1,654	36.27%	1,252	27.46%	4,560
Elbert	4,730	83.11%	961	16.89%	3,769	66.22%	5,691
Emanuel	4,603	75.51%	1,493	24.49%	3,110	51.02%	6,096
Evans	1,631	68.62%	746	31.38%	885	37.24%	2,377
Fannin	3,402	56.25%	2,646	43.75%	756	12.50%	6,048
Fayette	3,718	56.72%	2,837	43.28%	881	13.44%	6,555
Floyd	15,151	66.27%	7,713	33.73%	7,438	32.54%	22,864
Forsyth	4,693	76.48%	1,443	23.52%	3,250	52.96%	6,136
Franklin	4,192	85.92%	687	14.08%	3,505	71.84%	4,879
Fulton	129,849	67.84%	61,552	32.16%	68,297	35.68%	191,401
Gilmer	2,499	66.46%	1,261	33.54%	1,238	32.92%	3,760
Glascock	704	65.49%	371	34.51%	333	30.98%	1,075
Glynn	9,459	63.65%	5,403	36.35%	4,056	27.30%	14,862
Gordon	6,052	78.09%	1,698	21.91%	4,354	56.18%	7,750
Grady	3,758	75.66%	1,209	24.34%	2,549	51.32%	4,967
Greene	2,534	79.54%	652	20.46%	1,882	59.08%	3,186
Gwinnett	20,838	59.97%	13,912	40.03%	6,926	19.94%	34,750
Habersham	5,120	79.56%	1,315	20.44%	3,805	59.12%	6,435
Hall	12,804	71.54%	5,093	28.46%	7,711	43.08%	17,897
Hancock	2,117	76.48%	651	23.52%	1,466	52.96%	2,768
Haralson	4,550	77.76%	1,301	22.24%	3,249	55.52%	5,851
Harris	2,861	64.95%	1,544	35.05%	1,317	29.90%	4,405
Hart	4,605	84.26%	860	15.74%	3,745	68.52%	5,465
Heard	1,593	78.63%	433	21.37%	1,160	57.26%	2,026
Henry	5,717	68.56%	2,622	31.44%	3,095	37.12%	8,339
Houston	13,164	70.90%	5,404	29.10%	7,760	41.80%	18,568
Irwin	2,012	78.20%	561	21.80%	1,461	56.40%	2,573
Jackson	5,931	82.72%	1,239	17.28%	4,692	65.44%	7,170
Jasper	1,852	72.88%	689	27.12%	1,163	45.76%	2,541
Jeff Davis	2,405	79.45%	622	20.55%	1,783	58.90%	3,027
Jefferson	3,115	70.41%	1,309	29.59%	1,806	40.82%	4,424
Jenkins	1,820	76.37%	563	23.63%	1,257	52.74%	2,383
Johnson	2,210	76.00%	698	24.00%	1,512	52.00%	2,908
Jones	3,471	72.49%	1,317	27.51%	2,154	44.98%	4,788
Lamar	2,785	76.68%	847	23.32%	1,938	53.36%	3,632
Lanier	1,269	85.98%	207	14.02%	1,062	71.96%	1,476
Laurens	8,617	72.42%	3,281	27.58%	5,336	44.84%	11,898
Lee	1,727	60.87%	1,110	39.13%	617	21.74%	2,837
Liberty	3,328	77.27%	979	22.73%	2,349	54.54%	4,307
Lincoln	1,583	73.32%	576	26.68%	1,007	46.64%	2,159
Long	1,243	84.85%	222	15.15%	1,021	69.70%	1,465
Lowndes	8,830	66.18%	4,512	33.82%	4,318	32.36%	13,342
Lumpkin	2,301	80.79%	547	19.21%	1,754	61.58%	2,848
McDuffie	3,024	64.09%	1,694	35.91%	1,330	28.18%	4,718
McIntosh	1,978	78.71%	535	21.29%	1,443	57.42%	2,513
Macon	3,013	82.53%	638	17.47%	2,375	65.06%	3,651
Madison	3,367	75.12%	1,115	24.88%	2,252	50.24%	4,482
Marion	1,314	81.87%	291	18.13%	1,023	63.74%	1,605
Meriwether	4,830	76.91%	1,450	23.09%	3,380	53.82%	6,280
Miller	1,536	76.34%	476	23.66%	1,060	52.68%	2,012
Mitchell	4,495	74.09%	1,572	25.91%	2,923	48.18%	6,067
Monroe	2,962	73.32%	1,078	26.68%	1,884	46.64%	4,040
Montgomery	1,610	72.00%	626	28.00%	984	42.00%	2,236
Morgan	2,274	71.55%	904	28.45%	1,370	42.90%	3,178
Murray	3,511	79.80%	889	20.20%	2,622	59.60%	4,400
Muscogee	24,092	64.09%	13,496	35.91%	10,596	28.18%	37,588
Newton	6,294	74.65%	2,137	25.35%	4,157	49.30%	8,431
Oconee	2,228	65.30%	1,184	34.70%	1,044	30.60%	3,412
Oglethorpe	1,854	69.57%	811	30.43%	1,043	39.14%	2,665
Paulding	5,420	79.10%	1,432	20.90%	3,988	58.20%	6,852
Peach	3,989	77.43%	1,163	22.57%	2,826	54.86%	5,152
Pickens	2,571	72.55%	973	27.45%	1,598	45.10%	3,544
Pierce	2,628	82.85%	544	17.15%	2,084	65.70%	3,172
Pike	1,903	71.03%	776	28.97%	1,127	42.06%	2,679
Polk	6,115	75.88%	1,944	24.12%	4,171	51.76%	8,059
Pulaski	2,318	82.70%	485	17.30%	1,833	65.40%	2,803
Putnam	2,040	70.96%	835	29.04%	1,205	41.92%	2,875
Quitman	677	68.38%	313	31.62%	364	36.76%	990
Rabun	2,398	80.23%	591	19.77%	1,807	60.46%	2,989
Randolph	2,186	74.53%	747	25.47%	1,439	49.06%	2,933
Richmond	24,042	57.33%	17,893	42.67%	6,149	14.66%	41,935
Rockdale	4,640	60.94%	2,974	39.06%	1,666	21.88%	7,614
Schley	783	74.50%	268	25.50%	515	49.00%	1,051
Screven	2,168	64.83%	1,176	35.17%	992	29.66%	3,344
Seminole	2,074	75.28%	681	24.72%	1,393	50.56%	2,755
Spalding	7,593	67.00%	3,739	33.00%	3,854	34.00%	11,332
Stephens	5,560	80.58%	1,340	19.42%	4,220	61.16%	6,900
Stewart	1,632	79.03%	433	20.97%	1,199	58.06%	2,065
Sumter	5,328	72.19%	2,053	27.81%	3,275	44.38%	7,381
Talbot	1,634	78.07%	459	21.93%	1,175	56.14%	2,093
Taliaferro	748	76.02%	236	23.98%	512	52.04%	984
Tattnall	3,556	72.84%	1,326	27.16%	2,230	45.68%	4,882
Taylor	1,962	79.56%	504	20.44%	1,458	59.12%	2,466
Telfair	3,534	84.73%	637	15.27%	2,897	69.46%	4,171
Terrell	2,348	66.78%	1,168	33.22%	1,180	33.56%	3,516
Thomas	6,147	65.32%	3,263	34.68%	2,884	30.64%	9,410
Tift	5,185	70.57%	2,162	29.43%	3,023	41.14%	7,347
Toombs	4,047	65.56%	2,126	34.44%	1,921	31.12%	6,173
Towns	1,786	60.32%	1,175	39.68%	611	20.64%	2,961
Treutlen	1,567	77.12%	465	22.88%	1,102	54.24%	2,032
Troup	7,699	63.52%	4,422	36.48%	3,277	27.04%	12,121
Turner	2,265	84.48%	416	15.52%	1,849	68.96%	2,681
Twiggs	2,515	83.06%	513	16.94%	2,002	66.12%	3,028
Union	2,795	70.78%	1,154	29.22%	1,641	41.56%	3,949
Upson	4,219	59.29%	2,897	40.71%	1,322	18.58%	7,116
Walker	8,007	62.49%	4,807	37.51%	3,200	24.98%	12,814
Walton	5,402	76.20%	1,687	23.80%	3,715	52.40%	7,089
Ware	7,719	74.36%	2,661	25.64%	5,058	48.72%	10,380
Warren	1,335	64.96%	720	35.04%	615	29.92%	2,055
Washington	3,865	69.99%	1,657	30.01%	2,208	39.98%	5,522
Wayne	4,489	74.97%	1,499	25.03%	2,990	49.94%	5,988
Webster	622	79.03%	165	20.97%	457	58.06%	787
Wheeler	1,378	80.02%	344	19.98%	1,034	60.04%	1,722
White	2,125	77.27%	625	22.73%	1,500	54.54%	2,750
Whitfield	10,475	69.96%	4,498	30.04%	5,977	39.92%	14,973
Wilcox	2,153	86.15%	346	13.85%	1,807	72.30%	2,499
Wilkes	2,461	69.76%	1,067	30.24%	1,394	39.52%	3,528
Wilkinson	2,652	76.01%	837	23.99%	1,815	52.02%	3,489
Worth	2,790	70.70%	1,156	29.30%	1,634	41.40%	3,946
Totals	979,409	66.74%	483,743	32.96%	495,666	33.78%	1,467,458

==== Counties that flipped from Republican to Democratic ====
- All 159

=== By congressional district ===
Carter carried all 10 districts in Georgia.

District	Carter	Ford	Representative
1st	64.4%	35.6%	Ronald "Bo" Ginn
2nd	69.1%	30.9%	Dawson Mathis
3rd	69.1%	30.9%	Jack Brinkley
4th	57.2%	42.8%	Elliott H. Levitas
5th	67.5%	32.5%	Andrew Young
6th	67.5%	32.5%	John Flynt
7th	64.2%	35.8%	Larry Mcdonald
8th	74.8%	25.2%	Billy Lee Evans
9th	70.9%	29.1%	Ed Jenkins
10th	65.9%	34.1%	Doug Barnard Jr.

== Works cited ==
- Black, Earl; Black, Merle (1992). The Vital South: How Presidents Are Elected. Harvard University Press. ISBN 0674941306.
