= Chapel Hill, Georgia =

Unincorporated community in Georgia, U.S.

Coordinates: 33.6862202°N 84.7157681°W

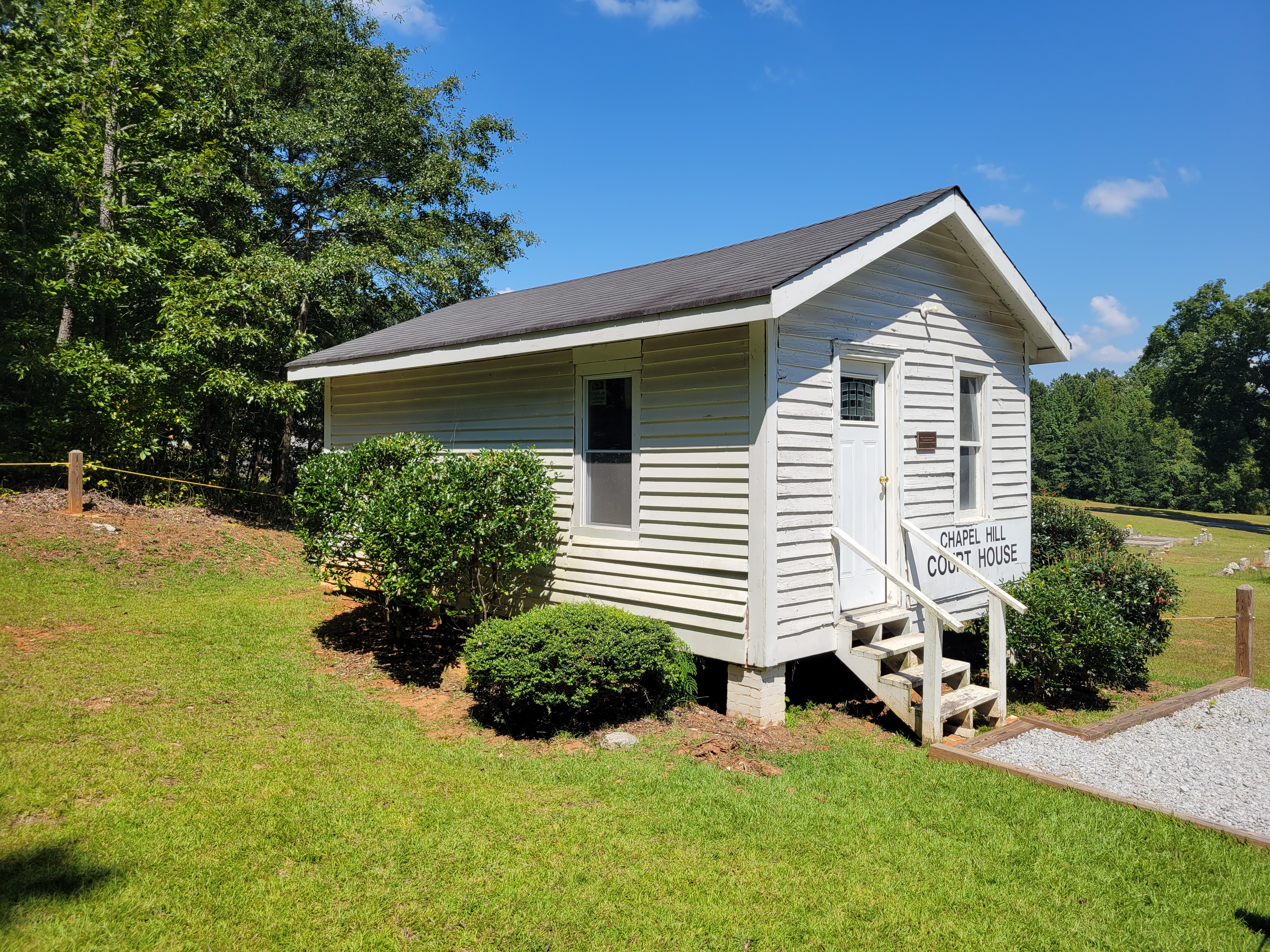
Chapel Hill Court House

Chapel Hill is an unincorporated community in Douglas County, in the U.S. state of Georgia.

== History ==
A post office called Chapel Hill was established in 1872, and remained in operation until 1903. The community's name most likely is a transfer from Chapel Hill, North Carolina.
