= WellStar Douglas Hospital =

Wellstar Douglas Hospital
- Wellstar Health System

Geography
- Location: 8954 Hospital Drive, Douglasville, Douglasville, Georgia, United States
- Coordinates: 33.7391°N 84.7316°W

Organization
- Type: General

Services
- Emergency department: Yes
- Beds: 102

Helipads
- Helipad: Yes, (IATA: 3GE6)

Links
- Website: https://www.wellstar.org/locations/hospital/douglas-hospital
- Lists: Hospitals in Georgia

Wellstar Douglas Hospital (formerly WellStar Douglas Hospital), originally known as Douglas Hospital and Douglas General Hospital, is a medical facility in Douglasville, Georgia. It opened in 1948.

The original Douglas Hospital opened with 15 patient beds. In 1974, construction was completed on the new Douglas General Hospital, increasing the number of beds to 98. The new hospital opened in 1975.

In 1976, Douglas Hospital opened its birthing center. It became one of the first hospitals in the nation where mothers and newborns roomed together.

In 1993, Douglas General merged with several other hospitals in the Northwest Georgia Health System. In 1998, the system was renamed WellStar Health System.
