= Winston, Georgia =

- Unincorporated community
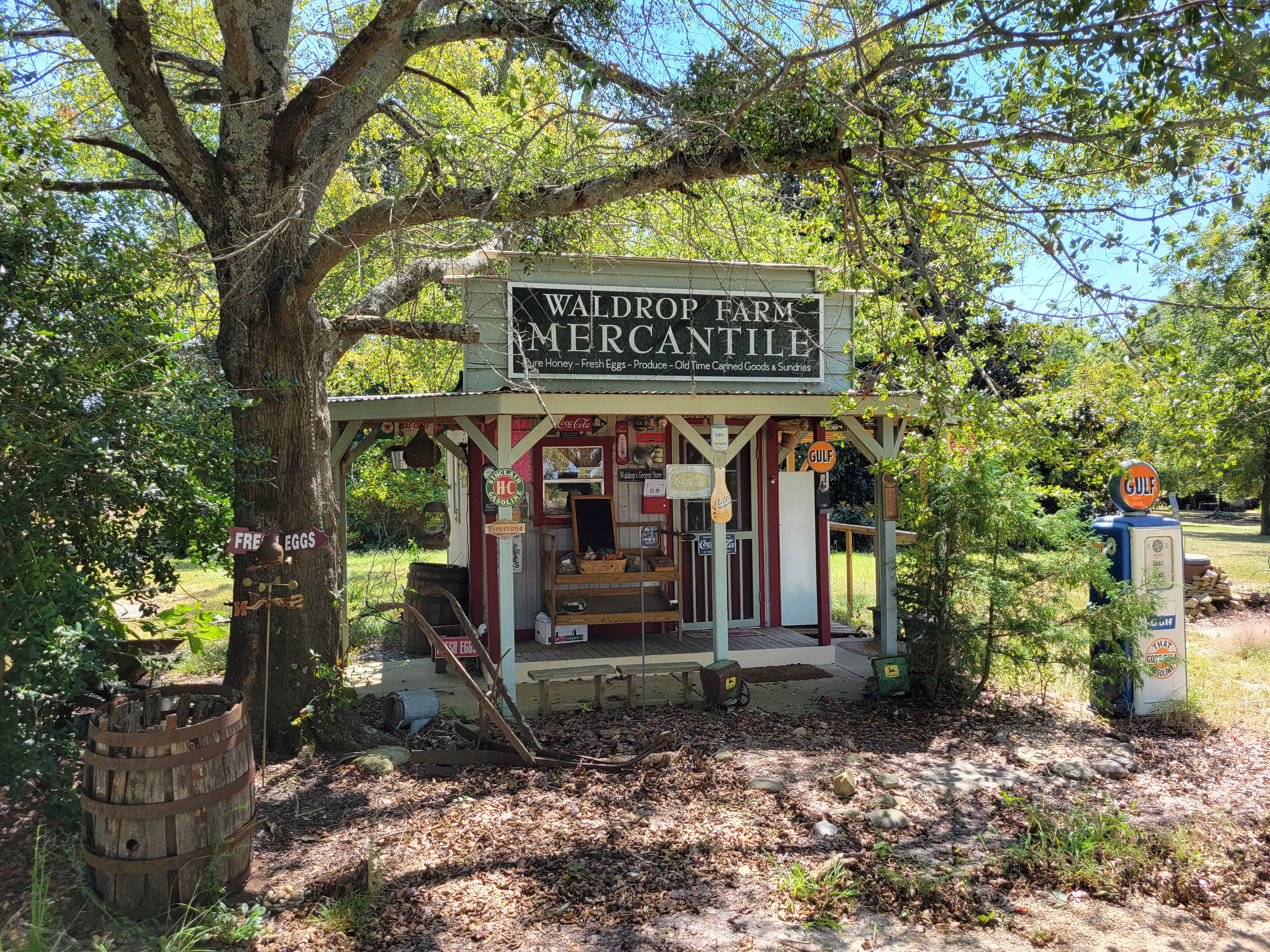
- Waldrop Farm Mercantile

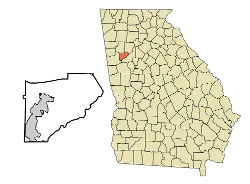
- Location in Douglas County and the state of Georgia
- Coordinates: 33°43′48″N 84°51′36″W
- Country: United States
- State: Georgia (U.S. state)
- County: Douglas
- Elevation: 1,197 ft (364.8 m)
- Time zone: UTC-5 (Eastern (EST))
  - Summer (DST): UTC-4 (EDT)
- ZIP code: 30187
- Area code: 770

Winston is an unincorporated community, formerly incorporated as a city, in southwestern Douglas County, Georgia, United States.

Winston is assigned the United States Postal Service ZIP code 30187. ZIP Code 30187 has segments in two counties, Carroll and Douglas.

Winston is located at 33.73°N 84.86°W which is 33°43′48″N 84°51′36″W.

== History ==
The community was named after "Uncle Jackie" Winn, a pioneer citizen.

The Georgia General Assembly incorporated Winston as a town in 1906. The town's municipal charter was repealed in 1995.

== Climate ==
Although the Winston-area historical earthquake activity is significantly below Georgia's state average (It is 97% below the overall U.S. average.), its historical tornado activity is above the state average (It is 135% greater than the overall U.S. average.).

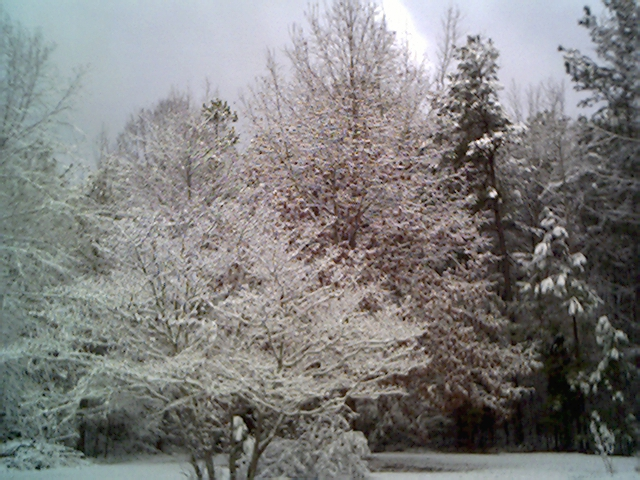
Snow in Winston in December 2010

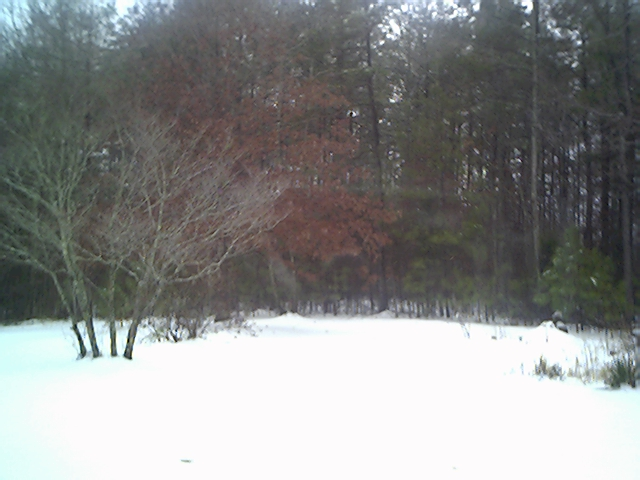
Snow in Winston in January 2011

== Education ==
=== Public schools ===
Winston is home to schools operated by the Douglas County School System.

- Mason Creek Elementary School "Wolf Cubs"
- Mason Creek Middle School "Wolves"
- Winston Elementary School "Wildcats"

=== Private school(s) ===
- Winston Academy (child care center)

=== Career schools and colleges ===
These career/technical schools/colleges/universities are local to Winston:

- West Georgia Technical College (Douglasville Campus)
- Georgia Highlands College (Douglasville Campus)
- Strayer University (Douglasville Campus)

== Points of interest ==
=== Parks ===
- Clinton Nature Preserve, located at 8720 Ephesus Church Road one mile west of Post Road. The Post Road/Ephesus Church Road intersection is one-half mile south of the Post Road/Interstate 20 interchange. This 200-acre park was donated to Douglas County by Ms. Annie Mae Clinton. The park is required by Ms. Clinton's will to remain in its natural state as much as possible. The park contains nature trails, and open exploration areas. A half-mile walking track encircles the Junior League ADA accessible playground, the first of its kind in Douglas County. About one mile into the woods (by hiking), is the Carnes Cabin, a pre-Civil War residence, that is listed on the National Register of Historic Places.
- F M Boatwright Memorial Park 33°42"17.39'N 84°50"17.39'W (33.7048306, -84.8441054), Feature ID: 1686482
- Post Road Park, located on Post Road, one mile south of the Post Road/I-20 interchange, includes a football field, two softball fields, concession stands, restrooms, and a small playground.
- Winston Park, located adjacent to Winston Elementary School on Bankhead Highway just east of its intersection with Post Road, includes a playground, seven youth baseball fields, two lighted tennis courts, a concession stand, and a meeting room.

=== Libraries ===
Libraries are located in the neighboring communities of Douglasville, Villa Rica, Lithia Springs, Hiram, and Dallas.

=== Buildings in the National Register of Historic Places ===
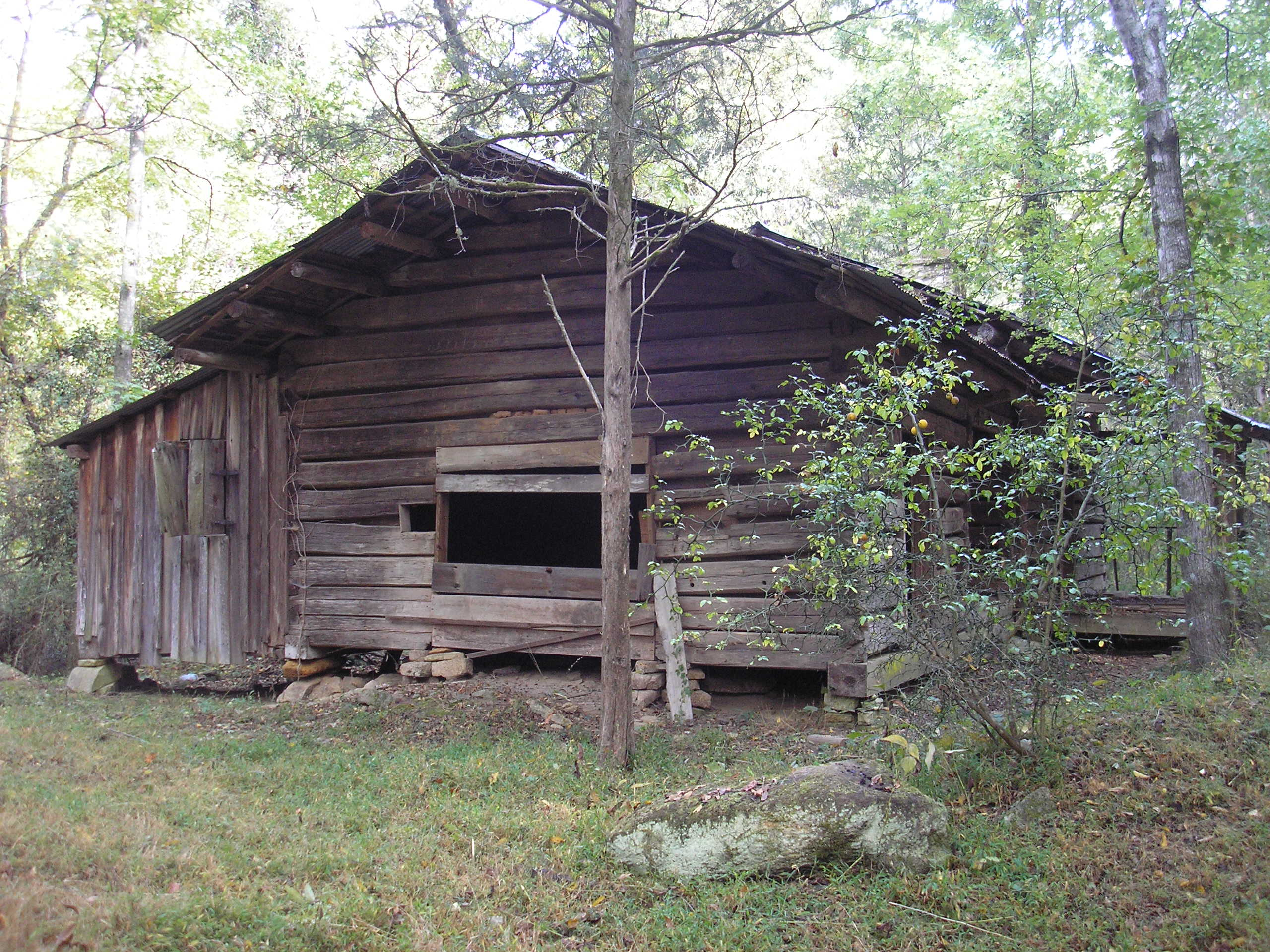

The John Thomas Carnes Family Log House (c. 1828), NRIS Number: 01000762, is located at: Clinton Nature Preservem, 8270 Ephesus Church Rd., Winston, GA

== Notable person ==
- Austin Hill, NASCAR driver.
