= Sweetwater Creek State Park =

State park in Georgia, United States

- IUCN category V (protected landscape/seascape)
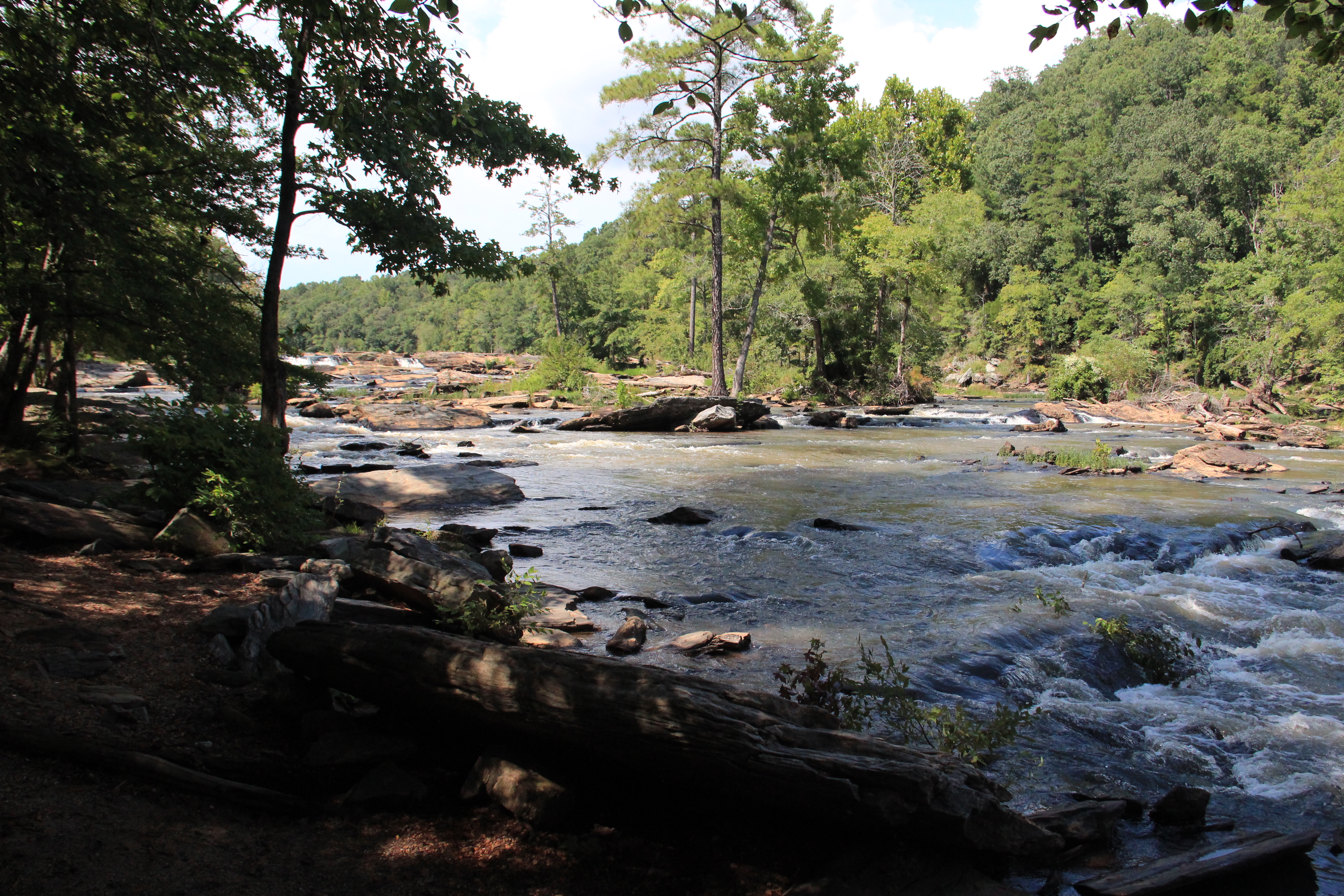
- Sweetwater Creek
- Interactive map of Sweetwater Creek State Park
- Location: Douglas County, Georgia, U.S.
- Nearest city: Atlanta
- Coordinates: 33°45′30″N 84°38′10″W
- Area: 2,549 acres (10 km^{2})
- Established: 1972
- Governing body: Georgia Department of Natural Resources
- Website: gastateparks.org/SweetwaterCreek

Sweetwater Creek State Park is a 2,549 acres (10.32 km^{2}) Georgia state park in east Douglas County, 15 miles (24 km) from downtown Atlanta. The park is named after Sweetwater Creek which runs through it. Cherokee people were forcibly removed from the area and it eventually became home to the New Manchester Manufacturing Company and mill town of New Manchester. During the American Civil War the textile mill and general store were burned down by the Union Army and the women and children taken away and eventually sent to Louisville, Kentucky and Indiana as refugees.

Sweetwater became an official state park in 1972, driven in great part by the work of the Georgia Conservancy, an environmental organization that was formed during a meeting at Sweetwater Creek in 1967. The park features wooded walking and hiking trails, the George Sparks Reservoir, a visitor center, a bait shop, and a gift shop, as well as the ruins of the New Manchester Manufacturing Company.

The Visitor Center displays artifacts that belong to Native Americans, remnants from the Civil War era, and mounted animals and birds. The park has rich biodiversity, geology, and history. The park's mission is to conserve environment for the present and future generations through use of various conservation methods such as bioretention ponds, solar panels, green roofs, and a composting toilet.

== History ==
=== Cherokee removal and land lotteries ===
The area of the Sweetwater Creek park used to belong to the Cherokee and according to a legend “Sweetwater” means the name of Chief Ama-Kanasta. In 1819, hunger for land led the state of Georgia to appeal to the United States government to remove the Cherokee; the appeal was rejected.

In 1827, the state of Georgia began to divide the Cherokee lands through lotteries. In 1829, just elected president Andrew Jackson and an ally of the state of Georgia, sided with the state. Even though the U.S. Supreme Court’s decree stated that Georgia had no right to forbid the Cherokee government, in 1831, Georgia’s General Assembly arranged all Cherokee land inspected and distributed by lottery. In 1838, federal troops started forcing the Cherokee to leave Georgia and Alabama and about 20,000 were forced to walk west to Oklahoma via the Trail of Tears.

In Georgia's Gold Lottery of 1832, Philip J. Crask won 40-acre (160,000 m^{2}) Lot 929 in District 18 of the Second Section and paid $18 grant fee. In 1837, Lot 929 was sold at an auction for $12.50 to John Boyle, who in 1845 sold it for $500 to Charles J. McDonald of Cobb County, a former governor of Georgia, and Colonel James Rogers of Milledgeville.

In 1846, Roger and McDonald used slave labor made bricks and started building a water-powered mill along Sweetwater Creek and on December 21, 1849, the five-story mill was in operation. McDonald and Rogers incorporated their business as Sweetwater Manufacturing Company, which made cotton, yarn and fabric. In 1858, McDonald renamed the Sweetwater Manufacturing Company as New Manchester Manufacturing Company after the center of the British textile industry, Manchester, England. By 1860, the factory produced 700 pounds (320 kg) of cotton per day, which was transformed into 120 bunches of yarn and 500 yards (460 m) of osnaburg.

=== Civil War era ===
In the summer of 1864, during the Atlanta campaign of the American Civil War, General Joseph E. Johnston removed the Confederate Army across the Chattahoochee River, leaving the New Manchester factory exposed to the Union Army. On July 2, 1864, two divisions of Union cavalry under Colonel Silas Adams (1st Kentucky) and cavalry under Major Haviland Thompkins (14th Illinois) of General Stoneman’s personnel, approached the factory with orders to shut it down and arrest all the employees.

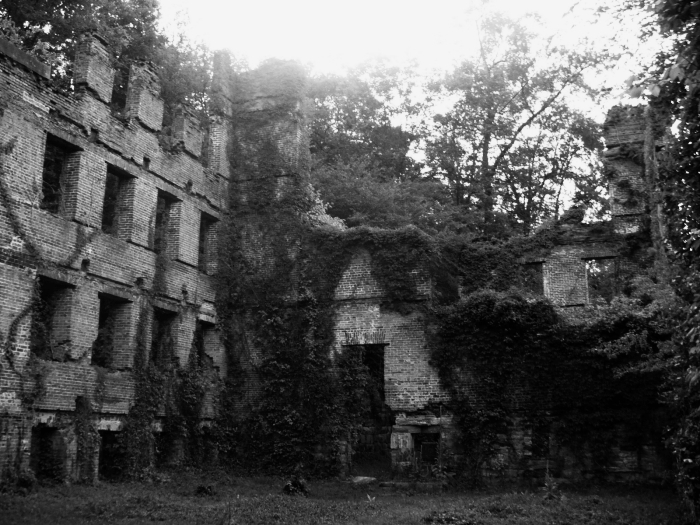
New Manchester Manufacturing Company ruins

On July 9, 1864, following orders from William Tecumseh Sherman, Major Thompkins burned the New Manchester mill and general store.

=== Roswell Mill Women ===
The arrested civilian mill employees were moved to Marietta and merged with other mill prisoners, forming a group of 600, all of them women and children. There were no adult male workers in the mill at the time it was captured. All able-bodied men had been called up to fight for the Confederacy in the battle raging around Atlanta. The women mill workers were charged with treason. They spent a week in holding at the Georgia Military Institute. During the week while the women were held in Marietta, several Union soldiers allegedly committed acts of assault against their captives. The women and children were then sent on by train, many to Louisville, Kentucky, others to Indiana. In towns already overcrowded with refugees, they struggled to survive. Many would die from starvation or exposure until a mill opened in 1865 that provided employment. The ultimate fates of many of these women are unknown, but the majority who survived settled in the North. Only a handful ever returned to Georgia.

=== Mill ruins ===
The mill ruins remain and are protected by the Sweetwater Creek State Park, which was founded to protect the ruins and the pristine area around it. All that remains today are the brick walls and the millrace that leads to the factory's water wheel.

== Biodiversity ==
=== Birds ===
- American crow (Corvus brachyrhynchos)
- American goldfinch (Carduelis tristis)
- American kestrel (Falco sparverius)
- American robin (Turdus migratorius)
- barred owl (Strix varia)
- belted kingfisher (Ceryle alcyon)
- bobwhite (Colinus virginianus)
- brown thrasher (Toxostoma rufum), the state bird of Georgia
- chimney swift (Chaetura pelagica)
- common grackle (Quiscalus quiscula)
- common nighthawk (Chordeiles minor)
- Cooper's hawk (Accipiter cooperii)
- eastern bluebird (Sialia sialis)
- eastern towhee (Piplo erythroph thalmus)
- golden eagle (Aquila chrysaetos)
- great blue heron (Ardea herodias)
- great horned owl (Bubo virginianus)
- northern cardinal (Cardinalis cardinalis)
- northern flicker (Colaptes auratus)
- red-bellied woodpecker (Melanerpes carolinus)
- red-headed woodpecker (Melanerpes erythrocephalus)
- red-shouldered hawk (Buteo lineatus)
- red-tailed hawk (Buteo jamaicensis)
- red-winged blackbird (Agelaius phoeniceus)
- ruby-throated hummingbird (Archilochus colubris)
- screech owl (Otus asio)
- sharp-shinned hawk (Accipiter striatus)
- starling (Sturnus vulgaris)
- summer tanager (Piranga rubra)
- Swainson’s thrush (Catharus ustulatus)
- white-throated sparrow (Zanotrichia albicollis)
- wood thrush (Hylocichla mustelina)
- yellow-bellied sapsucker (Sphyrapicus varius)

=== Mammals ===
- beaver (genus Castor)
- bobcat (Felis rufa)
- common raccoon (Procyon lotor)
- coyote (Canis latrans)
- deer
- feral hog
- grey fox (Urocyon cinereoagenteus)
- muskrat (Ondatra zibethicus)
- north American river otter (Lutra Canadensis)
- red fox (Vulpes fulva)
- skunk
- squirrel

=== Reptiles ===
- brown snake (Storeria dekayi)
- brown water snake (Nerodia taxispilota)
- coachwhip (Masticophis flagellum)
- common garter snake (Thamnophis sirtalis)
- copperhead (Agkistrodon contortrix)
- corn snake (Elaphe guttata)
- cottonmouth water moccasin (Agkistrodon piscivorus)
- eastern/black kingsnake (Lampropeltis getula)
- eastern hognose snake (Heterodon platyrhinos)
- eastern ribbon snake (Thamnophis sauritus)
- eastern worm snake (Carphophis amoenus)
- mole kingsnake (Lampropeltis calligaster)
- northern water snake (Nerodia sipedon)
- queen snake (Regina septemvittata)
- racer (Coluber constrictor)
- rat snake (Elaphe obsoleta)
- red-bellied snake (Storeria occipitomaculata)
- red-bellied/yellow-bellied water snake (Nerodia erythrogaster)
- ringneck snake (Diadophis punctatus)
- rough earth snake (Virginia striatula)
- rough green snake (Opheodrys aestivus)
- smooth earth snake (Virginia valeriae)
- scarlet kingsnake/milk snake (Lampropeltis triangulum)
- scarlet snake (Cemophora coccinea)
- southeastern crown snake (Tantilla coronata)
- timber rattlesnake (Crotalus horridus)

== Geology ==
=== Geologic history ===
The historical geology of the Sweetwater Creek State Park is divided into three periods such as deposition of sediments, metamorphism and folding, and uplift and erosion.

=== Deposition ===
The rocks at the surface at the park were deposited at least 450 million years ago. A sequence of sediments formed rocks such as shales, sandstones and greywackes. When these sediments were deposited, the environment was similar to that off the coast of Georgia today. These deposits were formed constantly through layering of older deposits by younger ones. Later these deposits were covered by basaltic lava. Eventually, the lava cover was mantled by thousands feet of sediments.

=== Metamorphism and folding ===
It is likely that the deposition continued until 450 million years before the present causing increase of weight of the sediments in the basin. When subsidence stopped uplift began due to compression of the subsidence from the sides. Due to the compression, temperature and pressure rose which led to a reformation of the rocks in the basin. Increasing temperature led to recrystallization of minerals in the rocks. As the result of recrystallization, the micas were preferentially oriented, or oriented in the same position. Due to this orientation, foliation took place. Recrystallization and foliation changed the shales, sandstones, greywackes and basalts into mica schists, quartzites, metagraywackes and amphibolites. It is likely that metamorphism destroyed fossil remains that may have been in the rocks. Along with metamorphism folding and faulting of the rocks took place. There were two periods of the folding in the park. Pressure led to breach of the rocks.

=== Uplift and erosion ===
Until approximately 250 million years ago uplift, folding, and faulting of the rocks took place. During and after uplift streams changed landscape. Streams carried away dissolved organic acids and groundwater decomposed the rocks. These processes take place today in the park. The washed sediments were found in the Coastal Plain of Georgia. Due to the erosion, rocks previously several miles deep are exposed to the earth's surface.

== Environmental conservation ==
The mission of the Sweetwater Creek State Park is to sustain, enhance, protect and conserve Georgia’s natural, historic and cultural resources for present and future generations. Wise use of the resources of the park is necessary in order to provide recreational and educational prospects and facilities. The protection of the park resources is critical during fast urban growth. Atlanta grows and its demand for land use increases. Urbanization creates an urban heat island due to absorption of heat by asphalt and concrete cover. As trees and green cover help to reduce urban heat island effect, the protection of parks is important. In 1998, the Chattahoochee River was named one of the nations’ most Endangered Rivers by the American Rivers Environmental Group. The river receives a large amount of pollutants brought by rainwater runoff which is due to the urbanization. One of the goals of the park is protection of the rivers that flow through the park and fish population in those rivers. Due to urban growth, the demand to the park has increased, creating problems with trail compaction and erosion, and unmanageable litter. The park offers several programs for public to participate in the park conservation including Rivers Alive Cleanup, P2AD-Pollution Prevention, waste management, trail maintenance, and recycling.

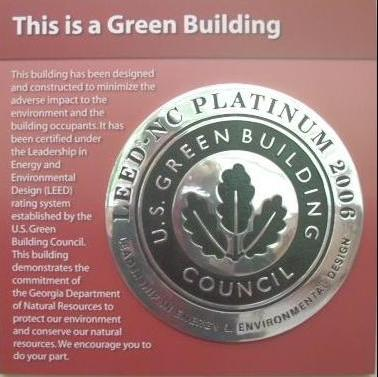
Platinum LEED

=== Visitor Center ===
Due to conservation efforts, the Visitor Center was built in a sustainable design in 2006. It is 9,000 square feet (840 m^{2}) building which construction cost $1.5 or $173/SF. The Visitor Center has received the Leadership in Energy and Environmental Design (LEED) Platinum Certification from the U.S. Green Building Council, which is the highest level attainable. In 2007, the Visitor Center was one of only twenty platinum-rated buildings in the world and it was the first in the Southeast. The building’s reduced impact: 77% reduction in water use, 51% reduction in electricity use, 80% of construction waste diverted from landfill, no increase in stormwater runoff after construction, and daylighting in 83% of interior spaces. The building is built into a hillside to minimize the physical and visual disturbance to the land. To reduce the urban heat island effect and water runoff, two 2,800-square-foot (260 m^{2}) building’s roofs are planted with native plants, green roofs. The green roofs are 12-inch (300 mm) deep.

The sun-controlling feature of the building allows the sun to warm the interior in winter and reduces solar energy in summer. The northern side of the building has clerestory windows that allow indirect sunlight into the building. The southern side of the building has shelves that bounce light into the interior. The building uses photocells and motion sensors for general lighting. Approximately 20% of the building electricity is produced by 10.5 kW photovoltaic arrays consisting of new and recycled solar panels. The building’s long side faces south allowing the solar panels to receive maximum sunlight. The building’s annual energy savings are 57,969 kilowatt-hours which avoid 27 tons of carbon emissions per year.

The Visitor Center uses the existing parking lot, minimizing more disturbance. The park has bioretention ponds to prevent downstream flooding and to filter storm water runoff with aquatic vegetation. The building’s construction materials such as steel structure, aluminum siding and framing are made from recycled materials. The construction waste is recycled. In order to save fuel by avoiding transportation of goods from farther away, the park used masonry stucco, fly-ash concrete and other local materials. In order to save water, the park collects rain water, has a composting toilet, Clivus multrum that uses no potable water, waterless urinals, and pervious concrete.

== Facilities ==
- 2,549 acres (1,032 ha)
- 215 acres (87 ha) lake
- Visitor Center-Museum
- 2 fishing docks
- Playgrounds
- 11 picnic shelters
- 5 campsites
- 10 yurts ("glamping" facilities)
- Group shelter and BBQ pit
- Benches along Sweetwater Creek

== Activities ==
- Hiking, on 9 miles (14 km) of trails in the park
- Lake and stream fishing (electric boat motors only)
- Canoe and fishing boat rental
- Picnicking
- Interpretive programs

== Annual events ==
- Ruins and Rapids Full Moon Hike (September through December)
- New Manchester Days Festival and Arts & Crafts Show (September)
- A Walk Through Time: Sweetwater Valley 75 Years Ago (September)
- SweetH20 50K Trail Race (Spring)

== Images ==
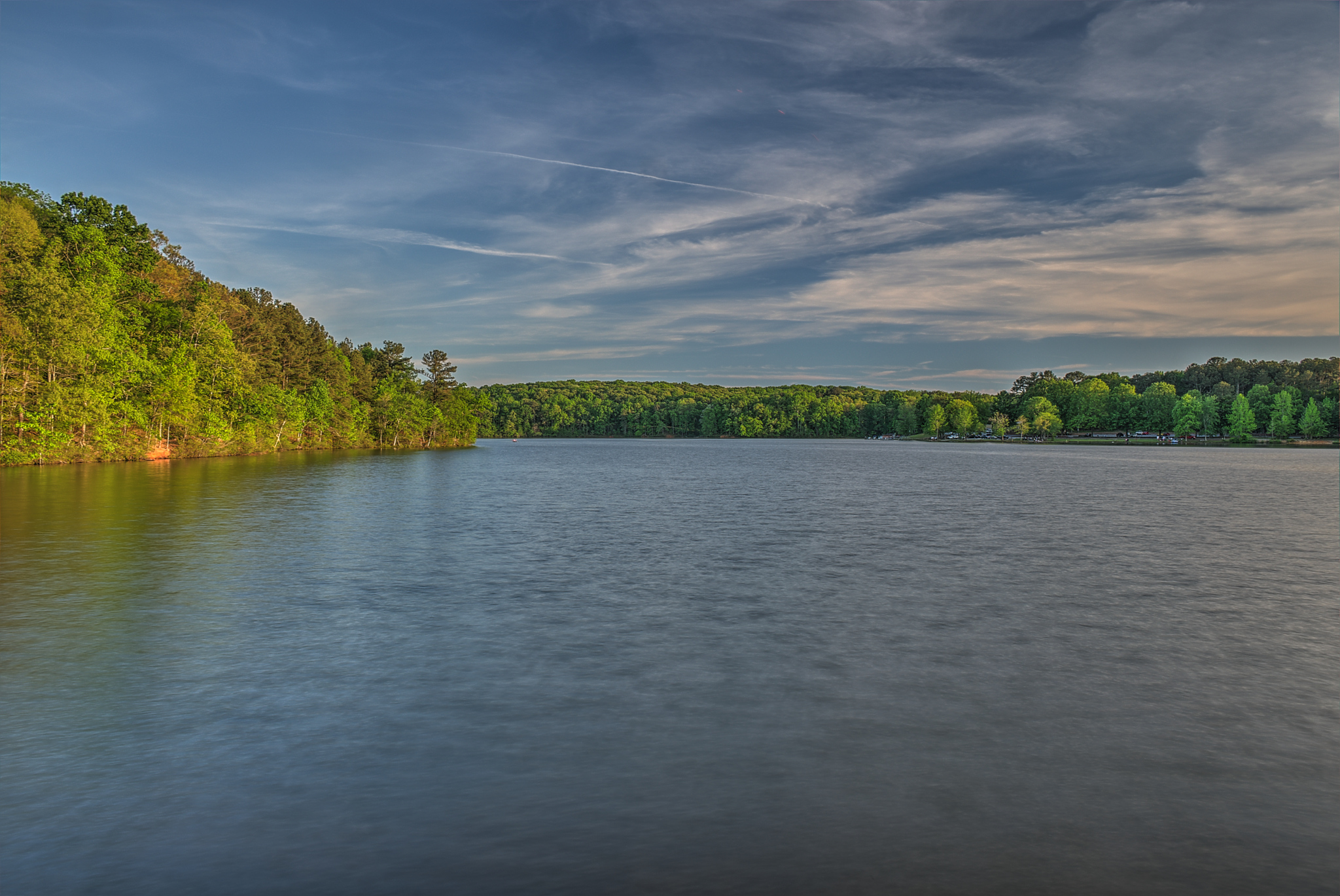
George Sparks Reservoir

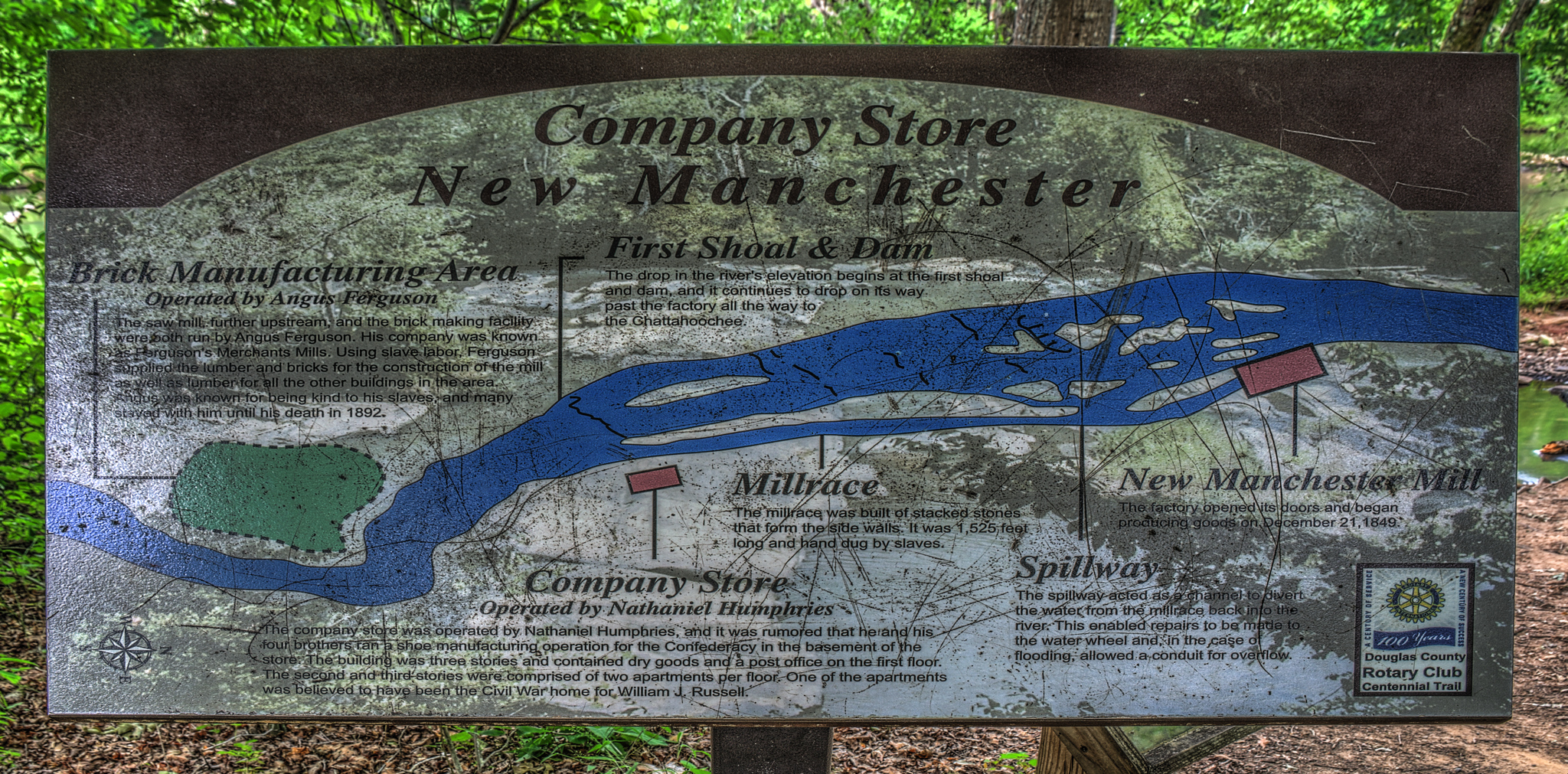
Informational Sign

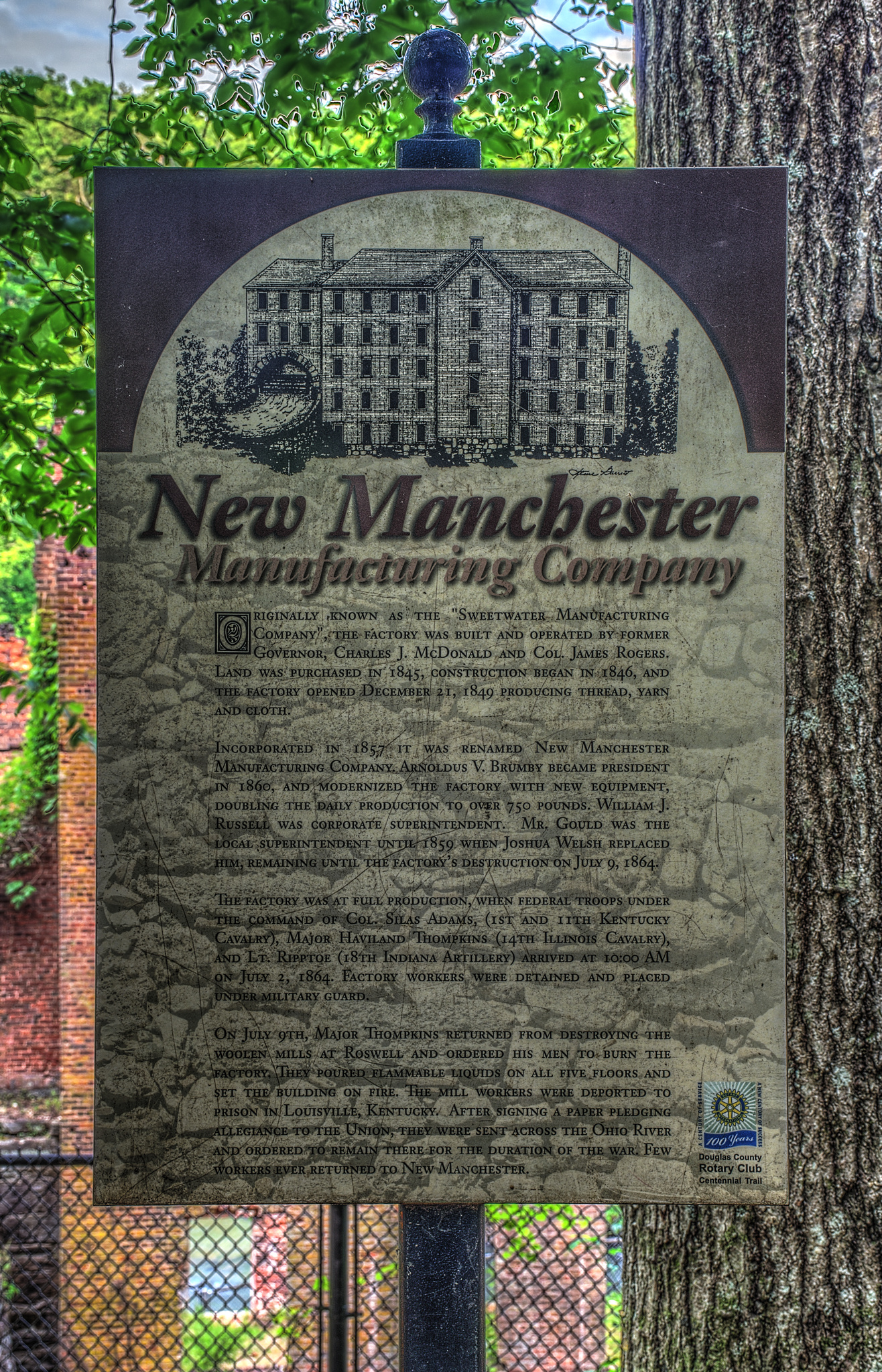
Informational Sign

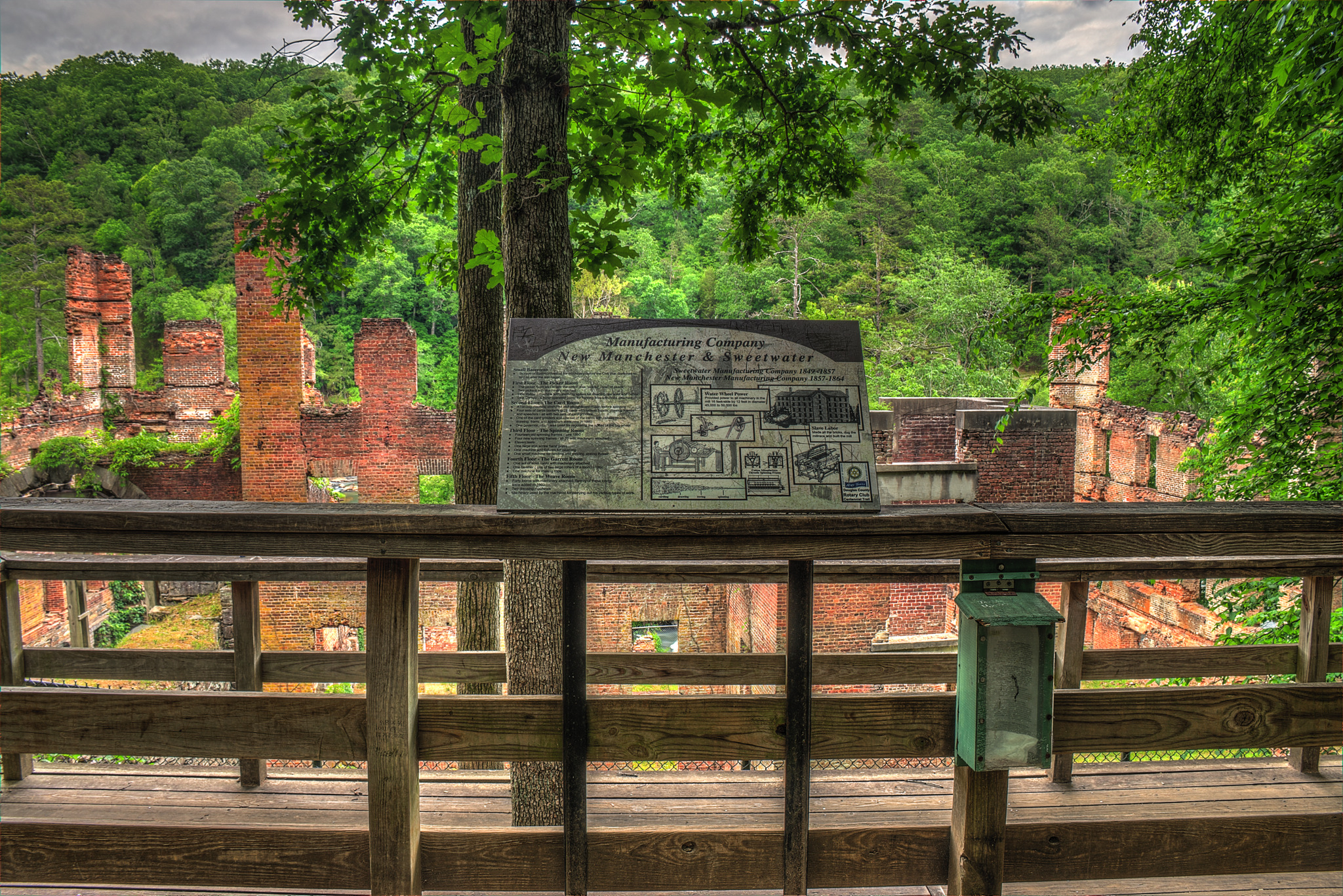
New Manchester Mill Ruins overlook
