= Fairplay, Douglas County, Georgia =

Coordinates: 33°37′24″N 84°51′36″W

Fairplay
- Unincorporated community Census-designated place
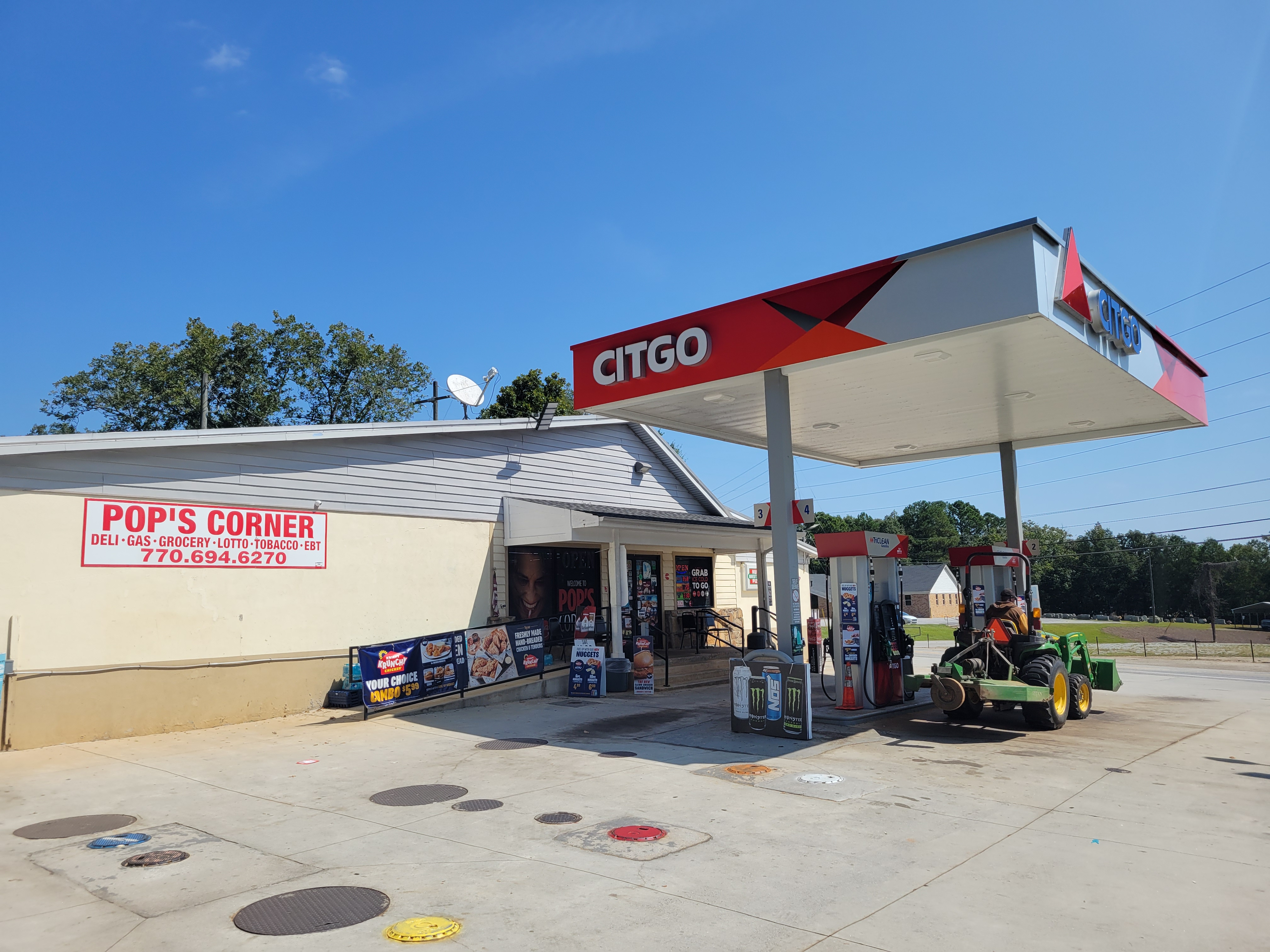
- Pop's Corner

- Location within Georgia Location within the United States
- Country: United States
- State: Georgia
- County: Douglas

Population (2020)
  - Total: 1,267
- Time zone: UTC−6 (Central (CST))
  - Summer (DST): UTC−5 (CDT)

Fairplay is an unincorporated community and census-designated place in southern Douglas County, Georgia, United States. It first appeared as a CDP in the 2020 census with a population of 1,267.

== Demographics ==
Historical population
Census	Pop.	Note	%±
2020	1,267		—
U.S. Decennial Census; 1850-1870 1870-1880; 1890-1910 1920-1930; 1940 1950 1960; 1970 1980 1990; 2000 2010 2020

Fairplay first appeared as a census designated place in the 2020 U.S. census.

Fairplay CDP, Georgia – Racial and ethnic composition Note: the US Census treats Hispanic/Latino as an ethnic category. This table excludes Latinos from the racial categories and assigns them to a separate category. Hispanics/Latinos may be of any race.
Race / Ethnicity (NH = Non-Hispanic)	Pop 2020	% 2020
White alone (NH)	1,065	84.06%
Black or African American alone (NH)	81	6.39%
Native American or Alaska Native alone (NH)	9	0.71%
Asian alone (NH)	6	0.47%
Native Hawaiian or Pacific Islander alone (NH)	0	0.00%
Other race alone (NH)	13	1.03%
Mixed race or Multiracial (NH)	37	2.92%
Hispanic or Latino (any race)	56	4.42%
Total	1,267	100.00%

== Schools ==
The main schools of the area are South Douglas Elementary, Fairplay Middle School, and although it is not technically a part of the area's school system, Alexander High School.
