= Kansas City–Florida Special =

Kansas City–Florida
Overview
- Service type: Inter-city rail
- Status: Discontinued
- Locale: Southeastern United States
- First service: November 26, 1911
- Last service: 1965
- Former operators: Frisco Railroad; Southern Railway

Route
- Termini: Kansas City, Missouri; Jacksonville, Florida (1959)
- Distance travelled: 1,229.5 miles (1,978.7 km) (1959)
- Service frequency: Daily
- Train numbers: 105 (eastbound), 106 (westbound)

On-board services
- Seating arrangements: Reclining seat coaches
- Sleeping arrangements: Sections, roomettes, double bedrooms, and a compartment (1959)
- Catering facilities: Dining car

The Kansas City–Florida Special was a pooled night train and the premier train of the Frisco Railroad and the Southern Railway. Operating from Kansas City, Missouri to Jacksonville, Florida, it was unique as being one of very few long distance passenger train to traverse the Mississippi River south of St. Louis, Missouri and north of New Orleans, Louisiana.

Additionally, it contrasted with trains of the Illinois Central Railroad and the Louisville and Nashville Railroad which offered Great Lakes Mid-West to Florida service, and the Atlantic Coast Line Railroad and Seaboard Coast Line Railroad which offered New York to Florida service. A running advertisement read, "Only the Kansas City–Florida Special offers through train service between Kansas City and the East Coast of Florida [with] convenient one-change connections at Kansas City and Pacific Coast points. This popular through train has modern roomette and bedroom sleeping cars between Kansas City and Miami - section, double bedroom and compartment sleeping cars and luxury reclining-seat coaches between Kansas City, Birmingham, Atlanta, and Jacksonville - lounge and dining car facilities." (Generally, the service to Miami required a transfer in Jacksonville.)

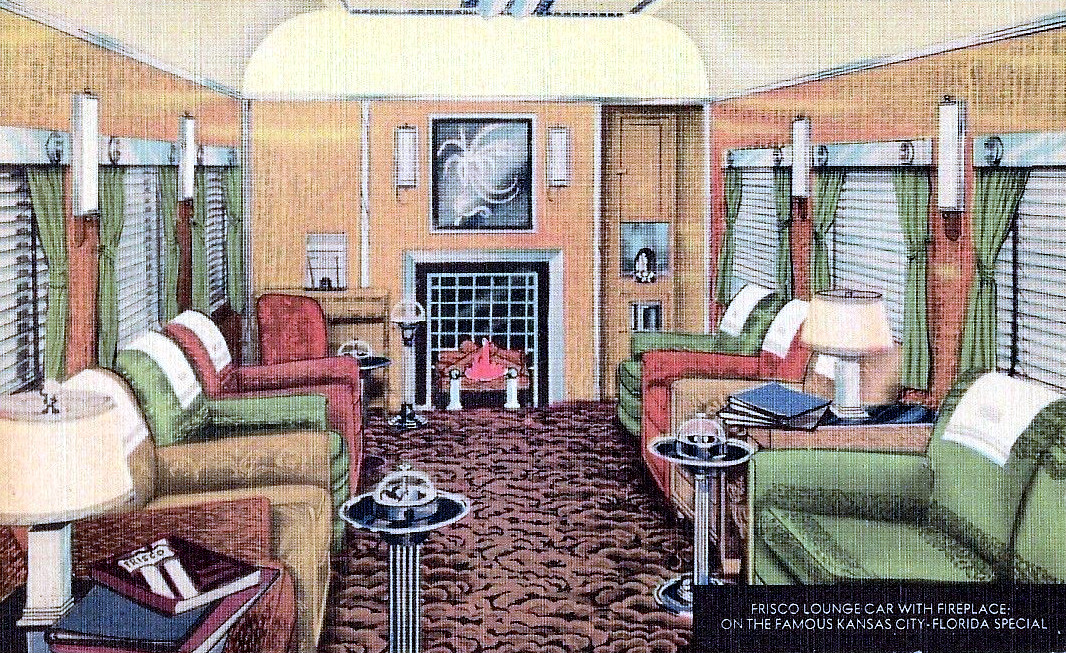
The lounge car interior of the Kansas City–Florida Special, c. 1930s

The train was inaugurated on November 26, 1911. Sleeping cars were dropped from the train by the train's last year of operation and service was terminated in 1965. The Frisco's Sunnyland ran generally parallel with this route as a local train, first starting from St. Louis, then joining Frisco's eastern mainline at Memphis to Birmingham. By the mid-1940s, the Sunnyland route began in Kansas City instead, with a sleeper partnership with the Southern Railway continuing beyond Birmingham to Atlanta. The Sunnyland had the eastern variant of second section veering south from Amory to Pensacola. The Sunnyland had the western variant, the Sunnyland-Will Rogers: a section originating in Oklahoma City and connecting with the Sunnyland in Springfield, Missouri.

In final years, the Kansas City-Florida Special and the Sunnyland lost their sleepers. Also, the Sunnyland was reduced to a strictly Kansas City - Birmingham route.

== Brief successor train ==
The Kansas City-Florida Special and the Sunnyland were succeeded from 1965 to 1967 by the Frisco's Southland, running from Kansas City to Birmingham, with a lounge buffet car operating between Kansas City and Memphis. This last train had its final run on December 9, 1967. With the termination of the Southland came the end of the Frisco's passenger train operations.

== Major station stops ==
- Kansas City
- Springfield, Missouri
- Jonesboro, Arkansas
- Memphis
- Tupelo, Mississippi
- Birmingham
- Atlanta
- Macon
- Valdosta, Georgia
- Jacksonville
