= Buffalo Springs =

Buffalo Springs may refer to:

== Places ==
=== Kenya ===
- Buffalo Springs National Reserve, a protected area in the Isiolo District of Eastern Province, Kenya

=== United States ===
- Buffalo Springs, New Mexico, an unincorporated community
- Buffalo Springs, North Dakota, an unincorporated community
- Buffalo Springs, Texas, a village in Lubbock County, Texas
- Buffalo Springs, Clay County, Texas, an unincorporated community
- Buffalo Springs, Mecklenburg County, Virginia, an unincorporated community
- Buffalo Springs, Nelson County, Virginia, an unincorporated community
- Buffalo Springs Airport, an airport
- Buffalo Springs Historical Archeological District, a historical archaeological district
