= Lithia =

Lithia may refer to:

- Lithium oxide, a chemical compound also known as lithia
- Lithia (water brand), a brand of lithia water from Lithia Springs, Georgia
- Lithia water, a type of mineral water containing lithium salts
- Lithia, Florida, an unincorporated suburb of Tampa, Florida
- Lithia, Virginia
- "Lithia" (The Outer Limits), an episode of the television series

== See also ==
- Litha, a solstice festival
- Lithia Motors, Inc., an automobile retailer headquartered in Medford, Jackson County, Oregon
- Lithia Park, a park in Ashland, Jackson County, Oregon
- Lithia Springs (disambiguation)
- Lithia Brewing, a beer company based in Wisconsin, later owned by the Walter Brewing Company
