= Lithia Springs =

Lithia Springs may refer to:

- Lithia Springs Creek, a tributary of the Susquehanna River in Pennsylvania
- Lithia Springs, Georgia, formerly a city, located in Georgia, United States
- Lithia Springs High School, a high school in Lithia Springs, Georgia
- Lithia Springs Campground and Marina, a federal campground and marina at Lake Shelbyville in Illinois
- Lithia Springs Regional Park, a spring and park in Lithia, Florida
- Lithia Springs Reservoir, a lake in South Hadley, Massachusetts
- Lithia Springs Resort, a hotel in Ashland, Oregon now known as the Ashland Springs Resort
- Lithia springs, a spring producing mineral water characterized by the presence of lithium salts
