= Buffalo Springs, Virginia =

Buffalo Springs, Virginia may refer to:

- Buffalo Springs, Mecklenburg County, Virginia
- Buffalo Springs, Nelson County, Virginia
