= Chapel Hill High School (Douglasville, Georgia) =

Public high school in Douglasville, Georgia, United States

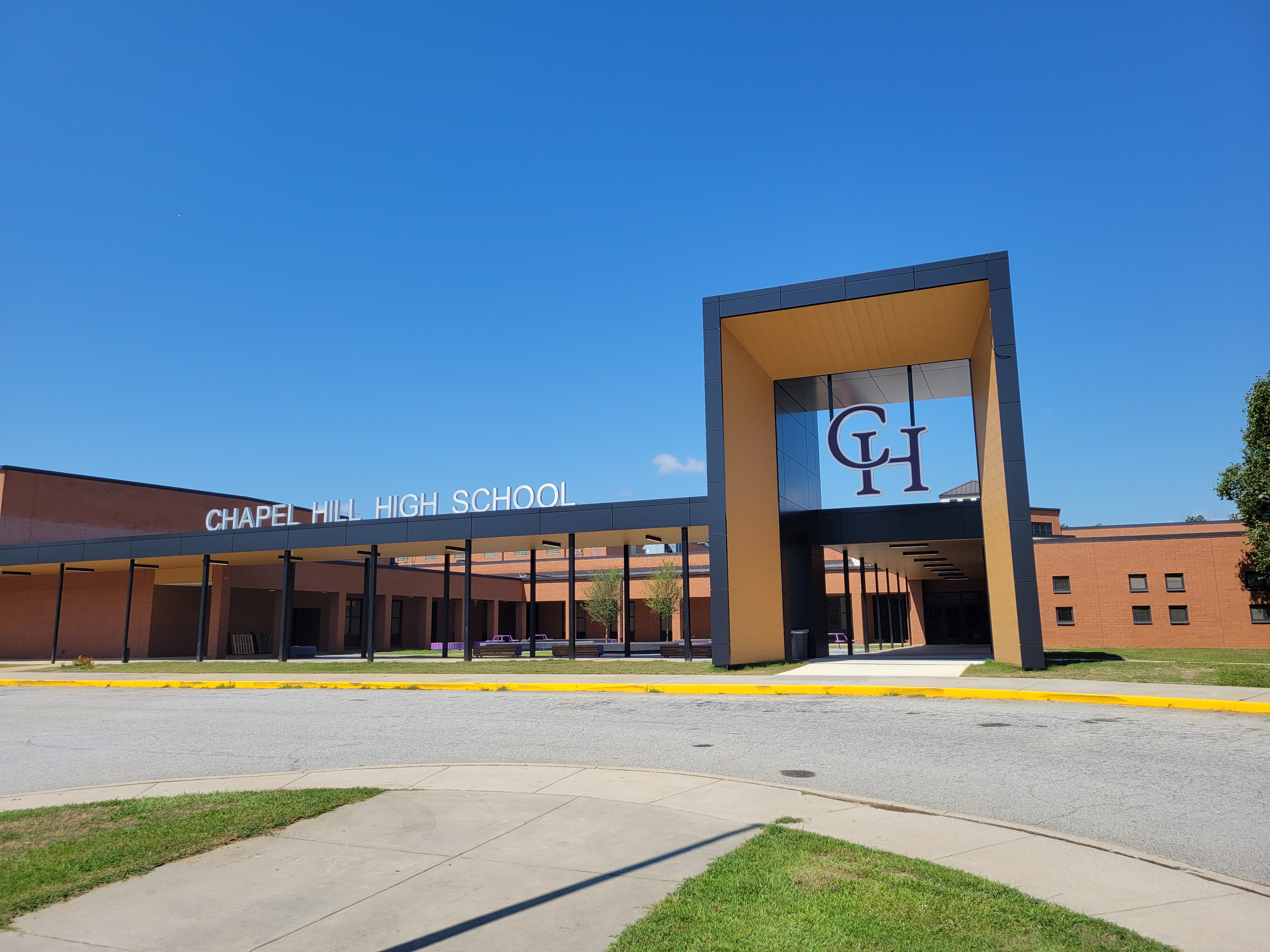
- Chapel Hill High School

Location
- 4899 Chapel Hill Road; Douglasville, Georgia 30135; United States; 33.672336°N 84.720318°W

Information
- School type: Public
- Established: 1999
- School district: Douglas County School District
- CEEB code: 111107
- Principal: Dr. Melisha Plummer
- Teaching staff: 85.70
- Grades: 9-12
- Enrollment: 1,665 (2023-2024)
- Student to teacher ratio: 19.43
- Colours: Purple and black
- Athletics: GHSA AAAAA
- Mascot: Panther
- Yearbook: The Prowler
- Website: chhs.dcssga.org

Chapel Hill High School is a public high school in Douglasville, Georgia, United States. It is known for its strong academic performance and athletic teams.

== History ==
Chapel Hill High School opened for the 1999–2000 school year. It was the fourth high school to open in the Douglas County School District, due to the overcrowding of Alexander, Douglas County, and Lithia Springs High Schools.

== Curriculum ==
Chapel Hill High School is known for strong academic performance. CHHS met AYP for the 2007–2008 school year. In 2005, 72% of the student body passed the science section of the GHSGT (Georgia High School Graduation Test), 96% passed the English section, and 95% passed the math section, compared with statewide averages of 68%, 95%, and 92% percent, respectively. Chapel Hill also offers a variety of Advanced Placement courses, the largest amount of any high school in the county, followed closely by Alexander High School.

Chapel Hill offers the following Advanced Placement courses:

- AP Human Geography
- AP World History: Modern
- AP U.S. History
- AP U.S. Government & Politics
- AP Microeconomics
- AP Psychology
- AP Precalculus
- AP Statistics
- AP Calculus AB
- AP Physics B
- AP Chemistry
- AP Biology
- AP Environmental Science
- AP English Language
- AP English Literature
- AP Research
- AP Seminar
- AP Art History
- AP 2-D Art & Design
- AP Spanish Language and Culture
- AP French Language and Culture
- AP Computer Science Principles
- AP Computer Science A

Chapel Hill High School also offers the AP Capstone Diploma program. Comprising two courses, AP Seminar and AP Research, the program is designed to provide students with a multidisciplinary and inquiry-based approach to learning.

== Notable alumni ==
- Cam Gill - linebacker for the Carolina Panthers
- Bradyn Swinson - college football defensive end for the LSU Tigers
