= Austell, Georgia =

- City
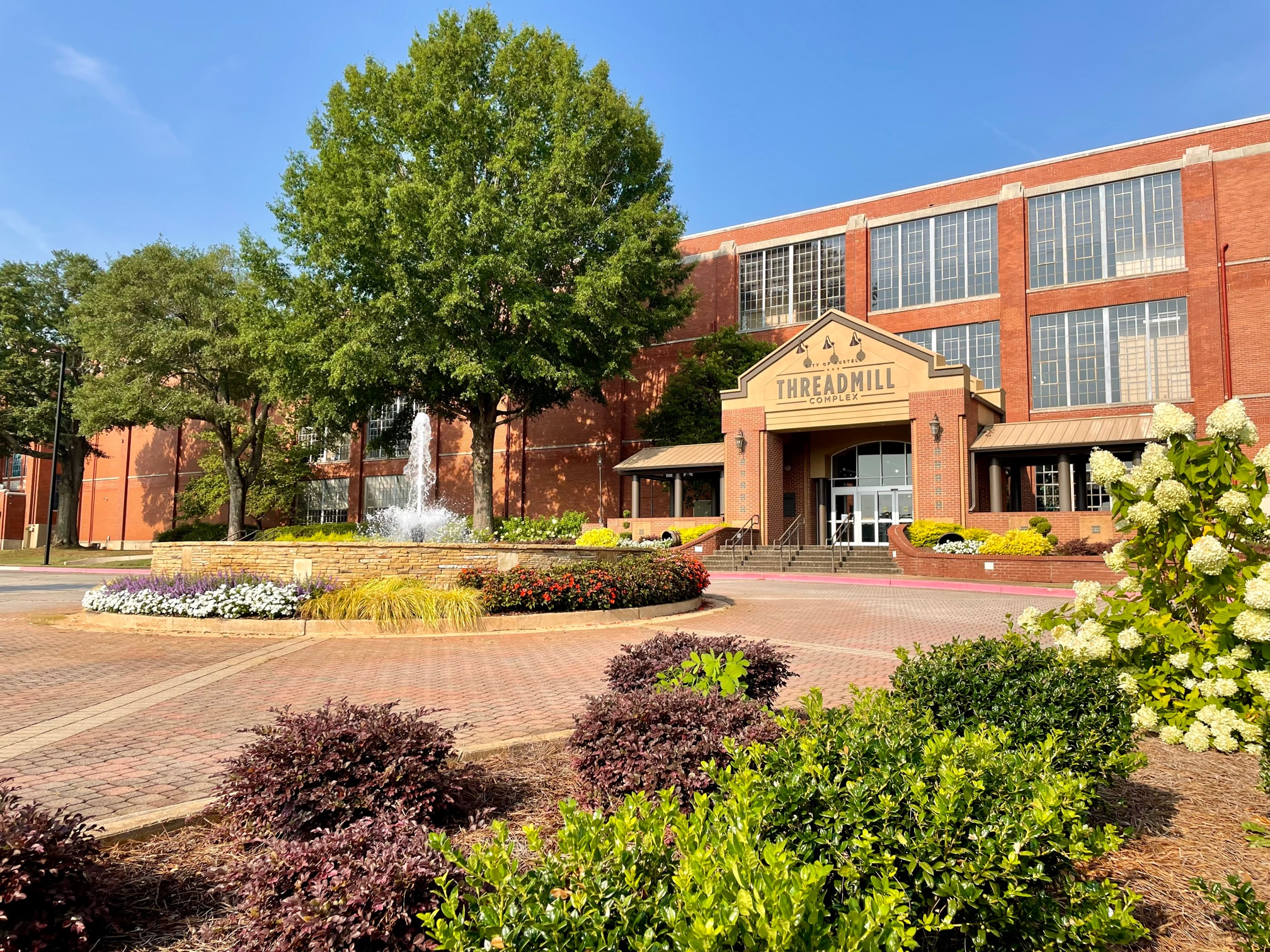
- City of Austell Threadmill Complex

- Location in Cobb County and the state of Georgia

- Location in Metro Atlanta
- Coordinates: 33°48′57″N 84°38′10″W
- Country: United States
- State: Georgia
- Counties: Cobb

Area
  - Total: 5.96 sq mi (15.44 km^{2})
  - Land: 5.95 sq mi (15.40 km^{2})
  - Water: 0.015 sq mi (0.04 km^{2})
- Elevation: 928 ft (283 m)

Population (2020)
  - Total: 7,713
  - Density: 1,297.5/sq mi (500.95/km^{2})
- Time zone: UTC−5 (Eastern (EST))
  - Summer (DST): UTC−4 (EDT)
- ZIP Codes: 30106, 30168
- Area codes: 770; 678, 470, and 943
- FIPS code: 13-04252
- GNIS feature ID: 0354416
- Website: austellga.gov

Austell is a city in Cobb County in the U.S. state of Georgia. It is part of the Atlanta metropolitan area. As of the 2020 census, the city had a population of 7,713.

== History ==
Game hunters and trappers frequently went through the area that is now Austell on their way to the area's salt licks. These early visitors claimed the area's waters had medicinal properties. It soon became a destination for therapeutic healing, leading to the founding of a town known as Salt Springs. As immigration increased and demand for land near the spring grew, G. O. Mozely donated and subdivided 40 acres (16 ha) of his land, enhancing the loose settlement with a street plan. Later, the spring was renamed Lithia Springs due to the water containing lithium carbonate, and the neighboring city of Lithia Springs was founded in 1882. In 1888, the lithia spring water was bottled and sold under the commercial name Bowden Lithia Spring Water. The historic lithia spring water is still bottled and sold under the name brand Lithia Spring Water. The Georgia Pacific Railway (Note: The Georgia Pacific Railway (not to be confused with the present-day Georgia-Pacific pulp and paper company) later merged into the Southern Railway, which is now part of Norfolk Southern Railway.) chose the town of Austell to be a station depot, being the dividing point for the major Birmingham and Chattanooga railway lines.

Austell was incorporated in 1885. The town is named for General Alfred Austell (1814–1881), in recognition of his efforts to bring major railways to the South. General Austell also founded the Atlanta National Bank (later renamed First Atlanta), which eventually became part of Wachovia and later Wells Fargo through various mergers and acquisitions. General Austell is buried in an elaborate Gothic Revival–style mausoleum at the highest point in Atlanta's Oakland Cemetery.

In 2009, Sweetwater Creek flooded, destroying many homes and businesses in the Austell area.

== Geography ==
Austell is located along the southern border of Cobb County at 33°48′57″N 84°38′10″W (33.815905, −84.636242). A small portion of the city extends south into Douglas County. It is bordered by Lithia Springs to the south and Mableton to the east. The city of Powder Springs is 4 miles (6 km) to the northwest. U.S. Route 78 passes through the city, leading east 15 miles (24 km) to downtown Atlanta and west 8 miles (13 km) to Douglasville.

According to the United States Census Bureau, Austell has a total area of 6.0 square miles (15.5 km^{2}), of which 0.015 square miles (0.04 km^{2}), or 0.24%, is water.

=== Topography ===
Sweetwater Creek, a tributary of the Chattahoochee River, flows through the city, passing north, then east of the city center. The area is relatively flat, with few large hills.

=== Climate ===
According to the Köppen classification, Austell has a humid subtropical climate with hot, humid summers and mild, but occasionally cold winters by the standards of the southern United States. The city experiences four distinct seasons. Summers are hot and humid, with a July daily average of 89 °F (32 °C). In a normal summer it is not unusual for temperatures to exceed 90 °F (32 °C). Winters are mild, windy, with some warm, sunny days and occasional snow, with a January average high of 50 °F (10 °C) and low of 30 °F (−1 °C). Occasionally, high temperatures will struggle to reach 40 °F (4 °C), and nights can dip into the teens. Subzero temperatures are very uncommon and only occur once every decade or so.

Climate data for Austell, Georgia
Month	Jan	Feb	Mar	Apr	May	Jun	Jul	Aug	Sep	Oct	Nov	Dec	Year
Record high °F (°C)	80 (27)	80 (27)	89 (32)	93 (34)	96 (36)	101 (38)	104 (40)	104 (40)	99 (37)	92 (33)	86 (30)	80 (27)	104 (40)
Mean daily maximum °F (°C)	50 (10)	55 (13)	64 (18)	72 (22)	79 (26)	86 (30)	89 (32)	88 (31)	83 (28)	73 (23)	63 (17)	54 (12)	71 (22)
Mean daily minimum °F (°C)	30 (−1)	34 (1)	38 (3)	45 (7)	54 (12)	62 (17)	66 (19)	65 (18)	59 (15)	46 (8)	38 (3)	31 (−1)	47 (8)
Record low °F (°C)	−12 (−24)	−2 (−19)	7 (−14)	21 (−6)	32 (0)	40 (4)	50 (10)	48 (9)	30 (−1)	22 (−6)	9 (−13)	−4 (−20)	−12 (−24)
Source: The Weather Channel

== Demographics ==
Historical population
Census	Pop.	Note	%±
1890	582		—
1900	648		11.3%
1910	755		16.5%
1920	758		0.4%
1930	963		27.0%
1940	1,229		27.6%
1950	1,413		15.0%
1960	1,867		32.1%
1970	2,632		41.0%
1980	3,939		49.7%
1990	4,173		5.9%
2000	5,359		28.4%
2010	6,581		22.8%
2020	7,713		17.2%
2025 (est.)	8,339	▲	8.1%
U.S. Decennial Census; 1850-1870 1870-1880; 1890-1910 1920-1930; 1940 1950 1960; 1970 1980 1990; 2000 2010 2020; 2025

=== Racial and ethnic composition ===
Austell city, Georgia – Racial and ethnic composition Note: the US Census treats Hispanic/Latino as an ethnic category. This table excludes Latinos from the racial categories and assigns them to a separate category. Hispanics/Latinos may be of any race.
Race / Ethnicity (NH = Non-Hispanic)	Pop 2000	Pop 2010	Pop 2020	% 2000	% 2010	% 2020
White alone (NH)	3,314	1,932	1,444	61.84%	29.36%	18.72%
Black or African American alone (NH)	1,314	3,593	4,500	24.52%	54.60%	58.34%
Native American or Alaska Native alone (NH)	18	13	26	0.34%	0.20%	0.34%
Asian alone (NH)	43	96	106	0.80%	1.46%	1.37%
Native Hawaiian or Pacific Islander alone (NH)	0	9	2	0.00%	0.14%	0.03%
Other race alone (NH)	12	22	53	0.22%	0.33%	0.69%
Mixed race or Multiracial (NH)	65	134	278	1.21%	2.04%	3.60%
Hispanic or Latino (any race)	593	782	1,304	11.07%	11.88%	16.91%
Total	5,359	6,581	7,713	100.00%	100.00%	100.00%

=== 2020 census ===
As of the 2020 census, Austell had a population of 7,713. The median age was 35.0 years. 25.8% of residents were under the age of 18 and 9.0% of residents were 65 years of age or older. For every 100 females there were 86.6 males, and for every 100 females age 18 and over there were 82.8 males age 18 and over.

100.0% of residents lived in urban areas, while 0.0% lived in rural areas.

There were 2,698 households in Austell, of which 41.1% had children under the age of 18 living in them. Of all households, 37.4% were married-couple households, 18.6% were households with a male householder and no spouse or partner present, and 37.1% were households with a female householder and no spouse or partner present. About 22.9% of all households were made up of individuals and 5.7% had someone living alone who was 65 years of age or older. There were 1,794 families residing in the city.

There were 2,851 housing units, of which 5.4% were vacant. The homeowner vacancy rate was 1.8% and the rental vacancy rate was 5.2%.

In 2020 the Austell population by county breakdown was as follows: 6,541 in Cobb County and 40 in Douglas County.

== Economy ==
The economy of Austell in its early years was largely tied to the rail depot, transferring people and goods and allowing many residents to commute to nearby Atlanta in pursuit of higher paying, more abundant jobs. Passengers no longer move by rail to or from Austell, though. Other industry includes recycling paper and plastics with exports going as far as China.

== Arts and culture ==
=== Annual events ===
The small neighbor of Babyland Located in the city of Austell holds an annual July 4 fireworks celebration. Hundreds of people attend the celebration which includes food, games, water slides and fireworks all provided by the community.

A Local Church Beacon of Light Christian Church Host an Annual Free Block Block Party for the Community on Easter Sunday

=== Points of interest ===
Six Flags Over Georgia, a large tourist attraction, is located in Mableton, 7 miles (11 km) southeast of downtown Austell, and has an Austell mailing address.

The Collar Community Center located near downtown is used for civic organizations and local get-togethers. The South Cobb Recreation Center is a 21,000-square-foot (2,000 m^{2}) facility that offers a gym, two multipurpose rooms, a caterer's kitchen, six offices, a conference room, three restrooms and a lobby. It has an occupational capacity of 939.

== Sports ==
During summer, softball games are nearly a continual occurrence with city leagues having 30 games and 450 players. In addition to cheerleading, 32 teams of over 500 youths are sponsored by the Sweetwater Valley Youth Association. Five lighted fields accommodate baseball and softball aficionados. Collar Park and Washington Street Park both have tennis courts.

== Parks and recreation ==
The Austell Parks and Recreation Department maintains five recreational facilities and seven parks Berry Park, a passive park, Collar Park and Legion Park which are both community parks, and Pine Street, Stephens, Washington Street and Berry Park which are neighborhood parks. Combined, they all cover an area of 36.2 acres (14.6 ha).

== Government ==
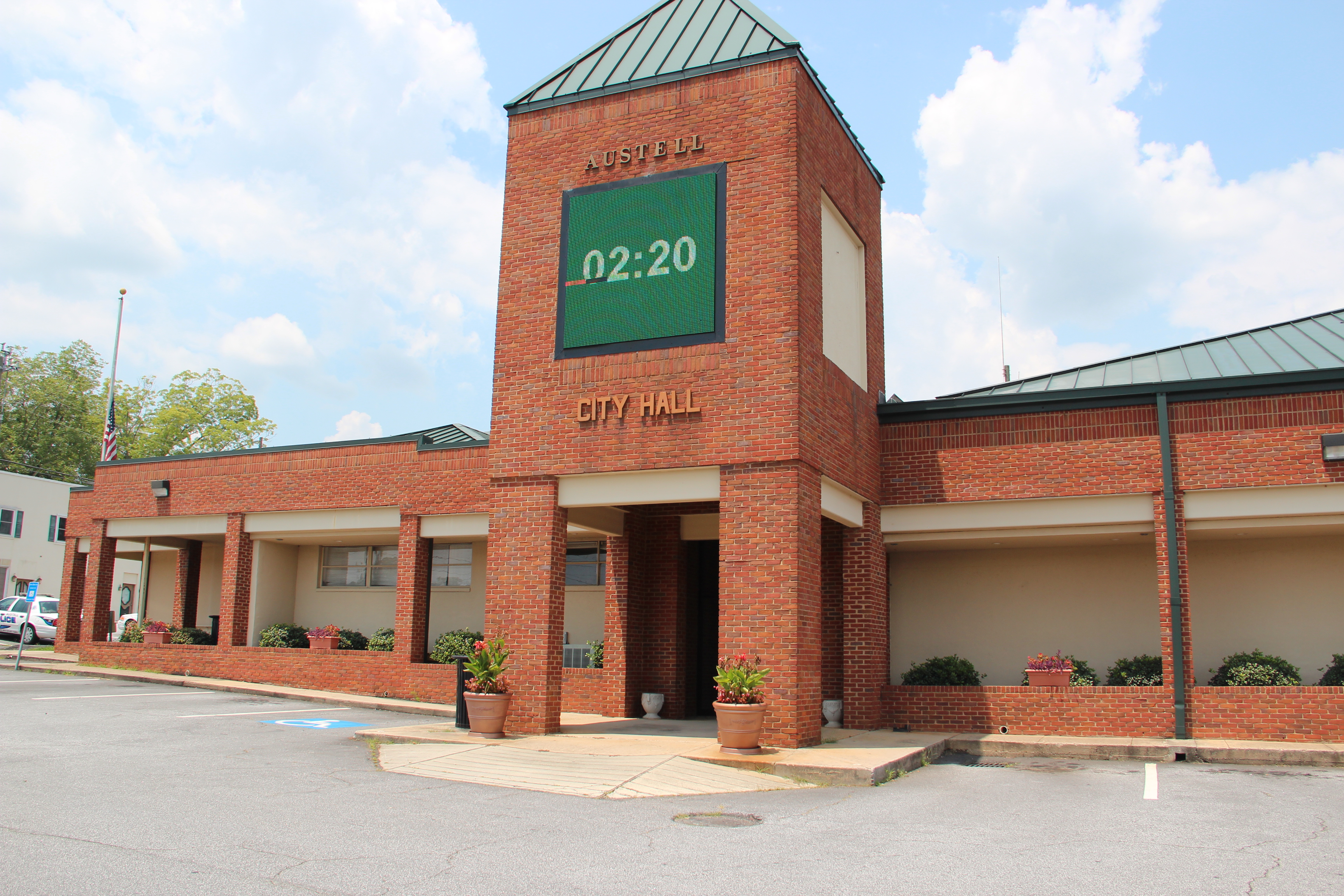
City hall

The city of Austell has seven elected officials: Mayor, representatives of four wards and two representatives at-large.

== Education ==
Public education in the Cobb County portion of Austell is handled by the Cobb County School District. Public schools in the city limits include Austell Primary School, Austell Elementary School, Garrett Middle School, and South Cobb High School.

Public education in the Douglas County portion of Austell (along with the rest of the county) is handled by the Douglas County School System.

Private schools in the city include:

- Cumberland Christian Academy
- Good Shepherd Learning Center
- Sunbrook Academy at Barnes Mill
- The Goddard School is located north of Austell

== Media ==
The locally read newspapers include the South Cobb Patch, The Atlanta Journal-Constitution and the Fulton County Daily Report.

== Transportation ==
Austell is 4 miles (6 km) north of Interstate 20. It also sits on the divergence of two Norfolk Southern rail lines, one to Birmingham and the other to Chattanooga.

== Notable people ==
- Roy Judkins (1943-2002), American soldier, recipient of the Distinguished Service Cross.
