= Buffalo Lithia Water =

Brand of mineral water

Buffalo Lithia Water (later Buffalo Mineral Springs Water) was a brand of lithia water bottled in Buffalo Lithia Springs, Virginia. It was advertised with outsize medical claims, including the ability to treat fevers and nervous disorders. One ad promised a "Marvelous Efficiency in Gout, Rheumatism, [and] Gastrointestinal Dyspepsia." It was sold from the late 19th century to the 1950s. At the height of its popularity, it was available in approximately 20,000 groceries and pharmacies in Europe, Canada, and the United States.

In 1910, the United States Attorney for the District of Columbia filed suit against the company for misbranding and false advertising, alleging that there was too little lithium in the water to qualify as a lithia water. Giving testimony in the case in 1912, a Dr. Collins testified that "for a person to obtain a therapeutic dose of lithium by drinking Buffalo Lithia Water, he would have to drink from 150,000 to 225,000 gallons of water per day." In 1917, the case was finally decided against Buffalo Lithia Water. The company was forced to change its name, rebranding itself as Buffalo Mineral Springs Water.

Subsequent to the case, the company was sold. In the 1950s, the United States Army Corps of Engineers took possession of the property containing the original spring. During the building of the John H. Kerr Dam and the creation of Kerr Lake, the grounds were flooded. The bottling business was never re-opened.
