= Douglas County School District (disambiguation) =

The name Douglas County School District may refer to:

- Douglas County School District RE-1, Castle Rock, Colorado
- Douglas County School District, Douglasville, Georgia
- Douglas County School District (Nebraska), Omaha, Nebraska
- Douglas County School District (Nevada), Minden, Nevada
- North Douglas School District, Drain, Oregon
