= Robert S. Alexander High School =

Location
- 6500 Alexander Pkwy. Douglasville, Georgia 30135-3596; United States; 33.681498°N 84.790492°W

Information
- School type: Public
- Established: 1986
- School district: Douglas County School District
- CEEB code: 111104
- Principal: Lora McAdams
- Teaching staff: 101.00 (FTE)
- Grades: 9-12
- Enrollment: 1,844 (as of 2023-2024)
- Student to teacher ratio: 18.26
- Colors: Red and black
- Athletics: GHSA AAAAAA
- Mascot: Cougar
- Newspaper: The Ant Hill Scrolls
- Yearbook: The Catamount
- Website: Alexander HS

Robert S. Alexander High School is a public high school in Douglasville, Georgia, United States. It is the third high school to open in the Douglas County School District.

== History ==
Originally built to relieve overpopulation between Douglas County High School and Lithia Springs High School, Alexander High School opened for the 1986–1987 school year. The school's namesake, Robert S. Alexander, was a long-time employee of the Douglas County School System.

Due to high Advanced Placement enrollment and high test scores, Alexander High School was chosen as one of 100 schools worldwide for AP Capstone beginning in 2014. In the 2021-2022 school year a student was stabbed.

== Athletics ==
Alexander High School teams are known as the Alexander Cougars and compete in the Georgia High School Association AAAAAA classification.

The boys' cross country team won the 2000 AAAA and the 2016 AAAAAA state championships.

The ALX Wrestling team has won the traditional state titles in 2010 and 2017, as well as the Dual State title is 2017.

The ALX JROTC Raiders mixed team has won the State Championship in 2011, 2018, 2019 and 2021.In the tier 2 division. And has competed in nationals in 2007. The mixed Platoon Exhibition team won the state title in the 2014-15 school year.

== Notable alumni ==
- Matt Capps, baseball player
- Justin Hall, wide receiver
- Austin Hill, racing driver
- Adaejah Hodge, track and field sprinter
- Megan Moroney, country singer-songwriter
- Niko Moon, (Class of 2002) Country Music singer.
- Eric Singleton Jr., wide receiver
- Jason T. Williams, (Class of 1994) BG USA, Commandant of United States Army Field Artillery School.
