= Horatio Fields =

American football player (born 2002)

No. 11 – Ole Miss Rebels
- Position: Wide receiver
- Class: Graduate

Personal information
- Born: November 14, 2002 (age 23)
- Listed height: 6 ft 2 in (1.88 m)
- Listed weight: 205 lb (93 kg)

Career information
- High school: New Manchester (Douglasville, Georgia)
- College: Wake Forest (2021–2024); Auburn (2025); Ole Miss (2026–present)
- Stats at ESPN

Horatio Fields Jr. (born November 14, 2002) is an American college football wide receiver for the Ole Miss Rebels. He previously played for the Wake Forest Demon Deacons and Auburn Tigers.

== Early life ==
Fields attended New Manchester High School. He led the team to their first regional championship.

== College career ==
=== Wake Forest ===
Fields committed to Wake Forest University in February 2021. Fields had 369 yards, along with four touchdowns in the 2024 season.

=== Auburn ===
Fields transferred to the Auburn Tigers in December 2024. Head coach Hugh Freeze stated that he "hit a home run" with the transfer. He performed well in spring practice, receiving more praise from Freeze. Fields played his first game against the Baylor Bears, where he received attention for a nine yard catch that led to a rushing touchdown by Jackson Arnold. He scored his first touchdown for Auburn against the Ball State Cardinals. Fields recorded 12 receptions for 106 yards and a touchdown before being ruled out indefinitely on September 24, 2025, after breaking his foot in practice. He announced that he would enter the transfer portal in December 2025.

=== Missouri ===
Fields committed to the Missouri Tigers in January 2026. Despite this, he chose not to sign with the program after Cayden Lee, another wide receiver, was recruited to join Missouri. He was officially released from his contract soon after.

=== Ole Miss ===
Fields announced he would join Ole Miss on January 31, 2026.
