= New Manchester High School =

Public high school in Douglasville, Georgia, United States

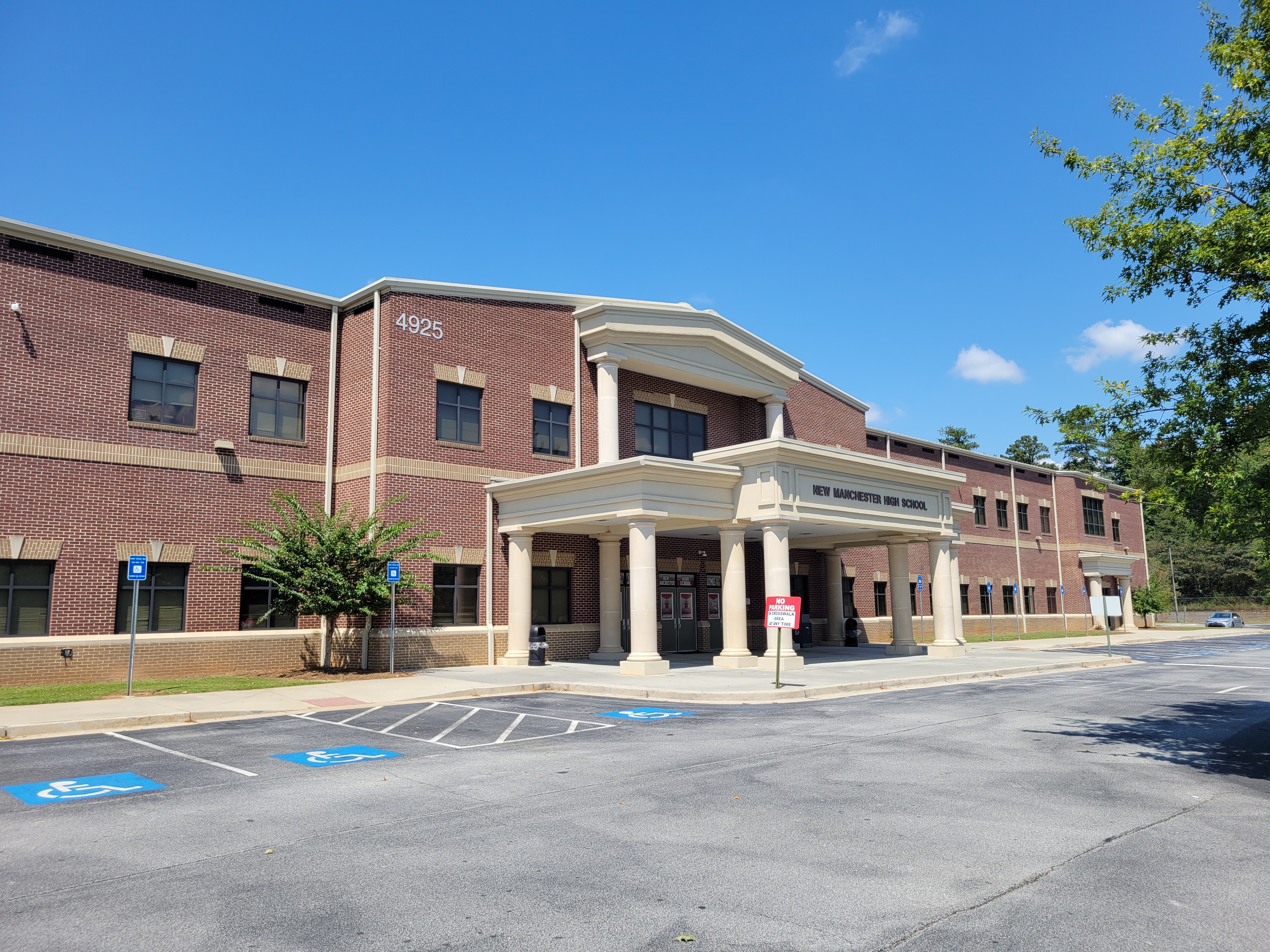
- New Manchester High School

Location
- 4925 Georgia 92/166; Douglasville, Georgia 30135; United States; 33.67662°N 84.66652°W

Information
- Type: Public
- Motto: Where Scholarship, Talent, Respect, Opportunity, Noble intentions, and Gratitude are our focus.
- Established: 2011
- School district: Douglas County School District
- Principal: Casey M. Bethel
- Teaching staff: 102.60 (on an FTE basis)
- Grades: 9–12
- Enrollment: 1,894 (2024–2025)
- Student to teacher ratio: 18.46
- Colors: Scarlet and gray
- Athletics: Georgia High School Association
- Mascot: Jaguar
- Website: nmhs.dcssga.org

New Manchester High School is a public high school in the area of Douglasville, Georgia, United States. It opened its doors in 2011. It is the fifth high school in the Douglas County School District.

== Location ==
New Manchester High School was built on an 80-acre site located on Boundary Waters Parkway in Douglasville on SR 70/SR 92/SR 154/SR 166. The school is located one mile from the Fulton County and Douglas County border, near Boundary Waters Park.

== About New Manchester ==
New Manchester has 102 classrooms, and the school holds 1,975 students.

== Administration ==
The Douglas County Board of Education named Casey Bethel the school's inaugural principal.

== Notable alumni ==
- Horatio Fields, college football wide receiver for the Ole Miss Rebels
- Tyree Weathersby, college football defensive end for the Tennessee Volunteers
