= Tyree Weathersby =

American football player

No. 18 – Tennessee Volunteers
- Position: Defensive end
- Class: Senior

Personal information
- Listed height: 6 ft 5 in (1.96 m)
- Listed weight: 268 lb (122 kg)

Career information
- High school: New Manchester (Douglasville, Georgia)
- College: Tennessee (2023–present)
- Stats at ESPN

Tyree Weathersby is an American college football defensive end for the Tennessee Volunteers.

== Early life ==
Weathersby attended New Manchester High School in Douglasville, Georgia. He had 67 tackles with six sacks in junior year and 61 tackles with seven sacks his senior year. He committed to the University of Tennessee to play college football.

== College career ==
Weathersby did not play in any games his first year at Tennessee in 2023 after suffering a season-ending injury during preseason camp. As a backup the next two seasons he appeared in 26 games and had 26 tackles and one sack. Weathersby entered the 2026 as a first-year starter.
