= Calvin Pace =

American football player (born 1980)

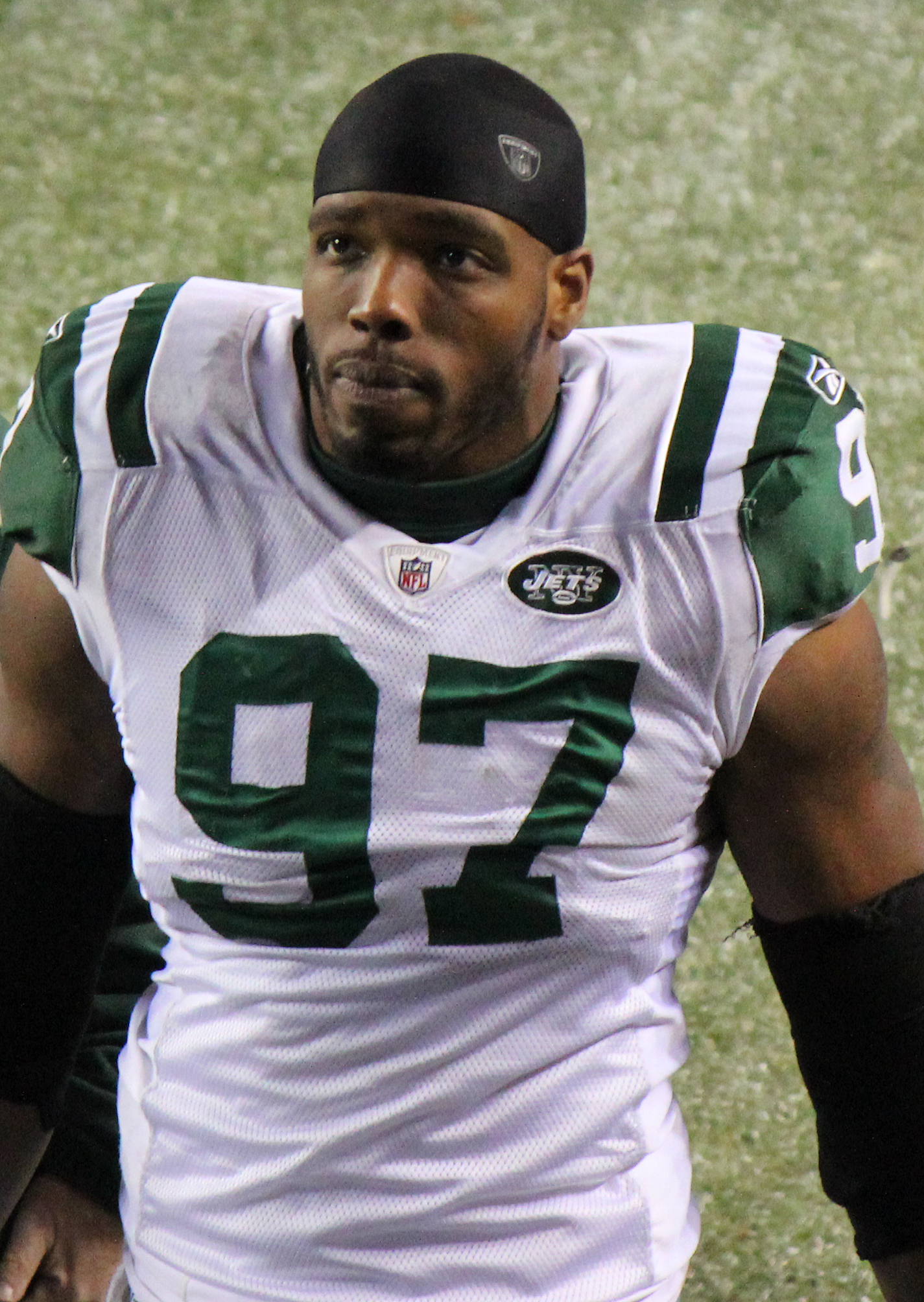
- Pace with the New York Jets in 2011

No. 79, 97
- Position: Linebacker

Personal information
- Born: October 28, 1980 (age 46); Detroit, Michigan, U.S.
- Listed height: 6 ft 4 in (1.93 m)
- Listed weight: 265 lb (120 kg)

Career information
- High school: Lithia Springs (GA)
- College: Wake Forest
- NFL draft: 2003: 1st round, 18th overall pick

Career history
- Arizona Cardinals (2003–2007); New York Jets (2008–2015)

Awards and highlights
- First-team All-American (2002); First-team All-ACC (2002); Second-team All-ACC (2001)

Career NFL statistics
- Total tackles: 621
- Sacks: 60
- Forced fumbles: 21
- Fumble recoveries: 11
- Interceptions: 3
- Defensive touchdowns: 1
- Stats at Pro Football Reference

Calvin Lamar Pace (born October 28, 1980) is an American former professional football player who was a linebacker in the National Football League (NFL). He was selected by the Arizona Cardinals in the first round (18th overall) in the 2003 NFL draft. He played college football for the Wake Forest Demon Deacons.

== Early life ==
Pace attended Lithia Springs High School in Lithia Springs, Georgia, from 1994 to 1998.

== College career ==
As a freshman in 1999, Pace played in seven games, and ranked 27th on the team in tackles. For the season he recorded four tackles, two for a loss, two sacks and one pass deflected.

In 2000, Pace finished fifth on the team with 50 tackles (33 solo), including 12 tackles for a loss and nine sacks.

In 2001, Pace finished sixth on the team recording 62 tackles (36 solo), including 18 tackles for loss and 10 sacks. He recorded one pass deflected and 11 quarterback hurries.

In 2002, Pace finished third on the team with 73 tackles (43 solo), including 22 tackles for a loss and eight sacks. He recorded six passes deflected and four quarterback hurries.

While at Wake Forest, Pace was a two-time Second-team All-ACC selection and finished his college career with 189 tackles, 29 sacks, five forced fumbles, and a fumble recovery.

== Professional career ==
Pre-draft measurables
Height	Weight	Arm length	Hand span	40-yard dash	10-yard split	20-yard split	Vertical jump	Broad jump
6 ft 4 in (1.93 m)	269 lb (122 kg)	34 in (0.86 m)	9 1/2 in (0.24 m)	4.80 s	1.74 s	2.86 s	33 in (0.84 m)	9 ft 7 in (2.92 m)
All values from NFL Combine.

=== Arizona Cardinals ===
Pace was selected by Arizona Cardinals in the first round (18th overall) in the 2003 NFL draft. In 2003, as a rookie, he started all 16 games. He recorded a total of 32 tackles and one sack.

In 2004, he played in 14 games, recording 12 tackles and 4.5 sacks.

In 2005, Pace played in only five games with one start. His season was ended when he suffered a laceration of his arm during the Cardinals bye week. Before Pace was placed on injured reserve he recorded 11 tackles and one sack.

In 2006, Pace played in all 16 games, starting five of them. He recorded 29 tackles and one sack.

In 2007, Pace was switched to outside linebacker and started all 16 games. He led the team with 106 tackles. Pace also recorded a career-high 6.5 sacks and one fumble.

In his five seasons with the Cardinals, Pace played in 67 games with 38 starts recording 186 tackles, 14 sacks and 11 passes deflected. While with the Cardinals he also set career highs in tackles, sacks, interceptions, passes deflected and fumble recoveries in 2007 with 106 tackles, 6.5 sacks, six passes deflected, two fumble recoveries, one forced fumble and one interception.

=== New York Jets ===
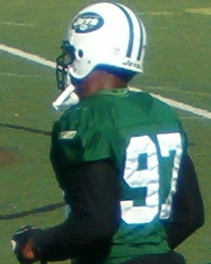
Pace at the Jets 2009 training camp.

==== 2008 ====
On March 3, 2008, Pace and the New York Jets came to terms on a six-year, $42 million deal that includes $22 million in guaranteed money. He had turned down a previous offer with the Miami Dolphins prior to signing with the Jets. In his first year in New York, Pace compiled 80 tackles (including 63 solo) and 7 quarterback sacks.

==== 2009 ====
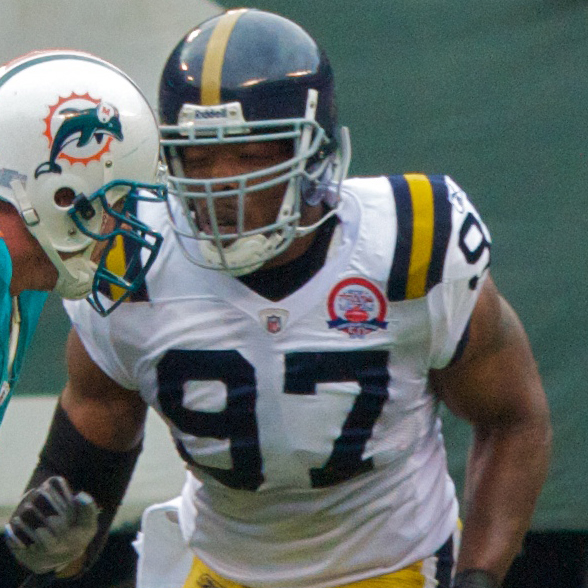
Pace wearing the Jets' alternate jersey during the 2009 season.

Pace was suspended for the first four games of the 2009 season by the NFL after testing positive for performance-enhancing drugs. In the 12 games he played, Pace recorded 55 tackles, 8 sacks, and 3 forced fumbles. The Jets finished 9-7 and made it to the AFC Championship Game before losing to Peyton Manning and the Indianapolis Colts, falling one game short of the Super bowl.

==== 2010 ====
In August 2010, Pace injured his foot during the preseason. After missing the first four games, Pace started the remainder of the season recording 51 tackles, 5.5 sacks, one interception, and one forced fumble helping the Jets finish 11-5 and advance to the AFC Championship Game for the second consecutive year before losing to the Pittsburgh Steelers by the final score of 24–19.

==== 2011 ====
In 2011, Pace played all 16 games with 53 tackles, 4.5 sacks, 1 interception, 2 passes defended, 1 forced fumble, and 1 fumble recovery.

==== 2012 ====
In 2012, Pace played all 16 games with 35 tackles, 3 sacks, 2 passes defended, 1 forced fumble, and 1 fumble recovery.

==== 2013 ====
Pace was released from the Jets on February 19, 2013. He was re-signed by the team on April 16 to a one-year contract. During the 2013 season, Pace played all 16 games with 37 tackles, 10 sacks, 3 passes defended, and 2 forced fumbles.

==== 2014 ====
The Jets re-signed Pace to a two-year, $5 million contract on March 16, 2014.

On September 13, 2014, Pace was fined $16,537 for a roughing the passer penalty during Week 1 against the Oakland Raiders.

== NFL career statistics ==
Legend
	Led the league
**Bold**	Career high

=== Regular season ===
Year	Team	Games		Tackles					Interceptions					Fumbles			
Year	Team	GP	GS	Cmb	Solo	Ast	Sck	TFL	Int	Yds	TD	Lng	PD	FF	FR	Yds	TD
2003	ARI	**16**	**16**	32	25	7	1.0	4	0	0	0	0	0	0	1	0	0
2004	ARI	14	0	19	14	5	4.5	2	0	0	0	0	5	2	0	0	0
2005	ARI	5	1	12	8	4	1.0	3	0	0	0	0	0	0	1	0	0
2006	ARI	**16**	5	31	27	4	1.0	2	0	0	0	0	1	2	0	0	0
2007	ARI	**16**	**16**	**99**	**80**	19	6.5	11	**1**	**14**	0	**14**	**6**	1	2	4	0
2008	NYJ	**16**	**16**	80	62	18	7.0	11	0	0	0	0	3	**5**	**4**	**50**	**1**
2009	NYJ	12	12	55	45	10	8.0	**13**	0	0	0	0	1	2	0	0	0
2010	NYJ	12	11	51	42	9	5.5	5	**1**	1	0	1	3	1	0	0	0
2011	NYJ	**16**	**16**	72	53	19	4.5	7	**1**	8	0	8	3	3	1	0	0
2012	NYJ	**16**	**16**	55	35	**20**	3.0	7	0	0	0	0	2	1	1	0	0
2013	NYJ	**16**	**16**	53	37	16	**10.0**	10	0	0	0	0	3	2	0	0	0
2014	NYJ	**16**	**16**	40	27	13	5.0	8	0	0	0	0	3	0	0	0	0
2015	NYJ	**16**	12	22	15	7	3.0	4	0	0	0	0	1	2	1	0	0
Career		187	153	621	470	151	60.0	87	3	23	0	14	31	21	11	54	1

=== Playoffs ===
Year	Team	Games		Tackles					Interceptions					Fumbles			
Year	Team	GP	GS	Cmb	Solo	Ast	Sck	TFL	Int	Yds	TD	Lng	PD	FF	FR	Yds	TD
2009	NYJ	**3**	**3**	**13**	**11**	**2**	0.0	1	0	0	0	0	0	**1**	0	0	0
2010	NYJ	**3**	1	10	10	0	**3.0**	**2**	0	0	0	0	0	**1**	0	0	0
Career		6	4	23	21	2	3.0	3	0	0	0	0	0	2	0	0	0

=== Measurables ===
- 4.65 40-yard dash
- 31 inch vertical
- 19 bench reps
- 4.62 short shuttle
- 9-foot-7 broad jump

== Personal life ==
Pace resides in Atlanta, Georgia.
