= Roy Judkins =

American soldier

Roy Eugene Judkins (Austell, 26 July 1943 - Augusta, 14 February 2002) was an American soldier. He served with distinction in the U.S. Army Ordnance Corps as an Explosive Ordnance Disposal Specialist from 1961 until 1978. He served in Vietnam with the 184th Ordnance Battalion (EOD). He was a member of the Explosive Ordnance Disposal Team providing direct support to the 173rd Airborne Brigade. SSG Judkins was awarded the Distinguished Service Cross for extraordinary heroism in action from 4 December through 8 December 1968 in the Republic of Vietnam. SSG Judkins distinguished himself by removing live explosive devices from the extremities of two Republic of Vietnam soldiers. SSG Judkins was honorably discharged from the military in 1978 with 17 years of honorable service.

== Early life ==
Roy Judkins was born July 26, 1943. Roy's father was a Sergeant in the United States Army so he moved around a lot as a child, including living overseas for several years.

== Military ==
Roy Judkins enlisted in the army a few weeks shy of turning eighteen years of age, so he needed his father's permission. Since he was a military man himself, Roy's father knew how much it would mean to his son. It was always Roy's dream to be in the military. Roy started his long military career as a ranger. Roy put himself in danger and went under enemy fire to rescue a patrol from a mine field. He got on his hands and knees and used only a bayonet to rescue his patrol. On his first trip out, he brought back 3 casualties, 2 wounded and 1 KIA, while disarming 4 mines. One of Roy's greatest achievements in his military career, is when he and several members of his patrol operated on enemy soldiers from behind sandbags. Roy put himself into danger by removing live explosive devices from the extremities from the wounded men so that the regular surgeons could operate on them without any risk to themselves.

== After the Military ==
After the military, Judkins was 100% disabled, mainly from issues that were service related. He would visit military complexes and speak with other soldiers to tell his story. One speech in particular, went to the men of the Explosive Ordnance Training Department. He would spend the rest of his days with his wife, Betty, in their small home in Martinez, Georgia.

== Honors ==
On November 8, 2005, SSG Judkins was awarded the Distinguished Service Cross on February 2, 1998, for extraordinary heroism in connection with military operations involving conflict with an armed hostile. SSG Judkins has also earned a plaque at Heroes' Overlook, which is still there today. On May 13, 1993, Roy was inducted in the Ordnance Hall of Fame. Roy is the highest decorated EOD service ember in the United States Department of Defense. He has been awarded the Bronze Star Medal for Valor for extraordinary valorous actions on August 11, 1968. Roy was recognized as an "honorary" first sergeant of the Headquarters and Headquarters Company. SSG Judkins was later quoted for saying "This is the greatest honor ever bestowed on me and that is the straight, honest truth." Roy has his picture and a biography of his life on permanent display in the United States Army Ordnance Museum.
