= Cam Gill =

American football player (born 1997)

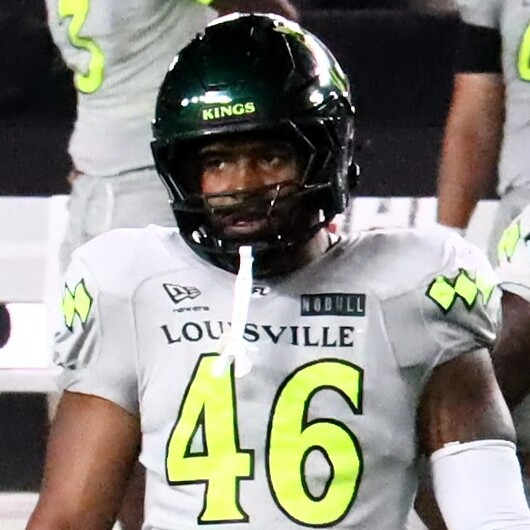
- Gill with the Louisville Kings in 2026

Profile
- Position: Outside linebacker

Personal information
- Born: December 14, 1997 (age 28); Sumter, South Carolina, U.S.
- Listed height: 6 ft 2 in (1.88 m)
- Listed weight: 232 lb (105 kg)

Career information
- High school: Chapel Hill (Douglasville, Georgia)
- College: Wagner (2016–2019)
- NFL draft: 2020: undrafted

Career history
- Tampa Bay Buccaneers (2020–2023); Carolina Panthers (2024)*; Detroit Lions (2024)*; Carolina Panthers (2024); Minnesota Vikings (2025)*; Louisville Kings (2026); Carolina Panthers (2026)*
- * Offseason or practice squad member only

Awards and highlights
- Super Bowl champion (LV); UFL champion (2026); UFL Defensive Player of the Year (2026); All-UFL Team (2026); UFL sacks leader (2026); 2× NEC Defensive Player of the Year (2018, 2019); 2× First-team All-NEC (2018, 2019)

Career NFL statistics as of 2024
- Total tackles: 51
- Sacks: 2.5
- Forced fumbles: 1
- Stats at Pro Football Reference

Cameron Gill (born December 14, 1997) is an American professional football outside linebacker. He played college football for the Wagner Seahawks then signing with the Tampa Bay Buccaneers as an undrafted free agent in 2020.

== College career ==
Gill was a member of the Wagner Seahawks for four seasons. As a sophomore, Gill recorded 53 tackles, 13 tackles for loss, 11.0 sacks, and one forced fumble. Gill was named first-team All-Northeast Conference (NEC) and the conference Defensive player of the year after recording 61 tackles, 24 tackles for loss, and 13.5 sacks. As a senior, he recorded 60 tackles with 9.5 sacks and 20 tackles for loss and was again named the NEC Defensive Player of the Year and as well as a STATS FCS First-team All-American, a Second-team All-American by Hero Sports, a third-team All-American by the Associated Press, and All-Eastern College Athletic Conference First-team.

== Professional career ==
Pre-draft measurables
Height	Weight	Arm length	Hand span	Wingspan	40-yard dash	10-yard split	20-yard split	20-yard shuttle	Three-cone drill	Vertical jump	Broad jump	Bench press
6 ft 2 1/4 in (1.89 m)	232 lb (105 kg)	32 in (0.81 m)	9 7/8 in (0.25 m)	6 ft 5 3/4 in (1.97 m)	4.60 s	1.56 s	2.69 s	4.64 s	7.65 s	32.5 in (0.83 m)	10 ft 2 in (3.10 m)	21 reps
All values from Pro Day

=== Tampa Bay Buccaneers ===
Gill was signed by the Tampa Bay Buccaneers as an undrafted free agent and made the team's active roster coming out of training camp. He made his NFL debut on October 8, 2020, against the Chicago Bears, making a tackle on special teams. In Super Bowl LV against the Kansas City Chiefs, Gill recorded 0.5 sacks on Patrick Mahomes during the 31–9 win.

On September 3, 2021, Gill was placed on injured reserve. He was activated on October 9.

On August 22, 2022, Gill was placed on injured reserve after suffering a Lisfranc injury in the preseason. On March 20, 2023, Gill re–signed with the Buccaneers.

=== Carolina Panthers ===
On May 13, 2024, Gill signed with the Carolina Panthers. He was placed on injured reserve on August 27, and released shortly after.

=== Detroit Lions ===
On October 7, 2024, Gill signed with the Detroit Lions' practice squad.

=== Carolina Panthers (second stint) ===
On October 22, 2024, Gill was signed by the Carolina Panthers off the Lions practice squad.

=== Minnesota Vikings ===
On August 13, 2025, Gill was signed by the Minnesota Vikings. He was released by the Vikings on August 24.

=== Louisville Kings ===
On February 3, 2026, Gill signed with the Louisville Kings of the United Football League (UFL). On June 10, Gill was named the UFL Defensive Player of the Year, having set the UFL single-season sack record with 10 sacks.

=== Carolina Panthers (third stint) ===
On July 24, 2026, Gill signed with the Carolina Panthers. Gill was released by Carolina on August 30 as a part of final roster cuts; he was re–signed to the team's practice squad the next day. He was released by Carolina on September 9. On September 29, Gill was re-signed to the practice squad. He was released on October 13.
