= Lithia (water brand) =

American mineral water

Lithia Spring Water
- Country: USA
- Introduced: 1888; 137 years ago
- Source: Lithia Springs, GA
- Type: Lithia water
- pH: 7.3 - 8
- Bromine (Br): 450 mcg
- Calcium (Ca): 130 mg
- Lithium (Li): 500 mcg
- Magnesium (Mg): 8 mg
- Potassium (K): 17 mg
- Sodium (Na): 450 mg
- TDS: 2300
- Website: Lithiaspringwater.com
- All concentrations in milligrams per liter (mg/L); pH without units

Lithia Spring Water (also called Lithia) is an American brand of high mineral content lithia water that naturally contains lithium carbonate. Since 1888 it has been sourced from an ancient Native American sacred spring that is part of the Stone Mountain, Georgia, geological pluton (granite intrusion) formation. Located at Lithia Springs, Georgia, on the boundary of Cobb and Douglas counties, approximately twelve miles from the city of Atlanta.

Lithia Spring Water contains a high ionic-mineral content, as measured by total dissolved solids (TDS) of 2,300 milligrams per liter. It contains the following chemical elements, in amounts of 100 or more micrograms per liter: lithium, calcium, sulfate, magnesium, potassium, silica, and sodium. The brand is owned by Lithia Spring Water, LLC.; Lithia Spring Water is sold directly from Historic Lithia Springs and shipped only within the United States.

== History ==
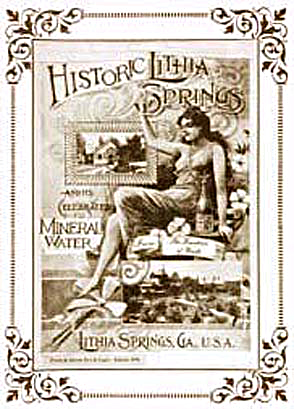
Lithia Spring Water 1888 poster

Lithia Springs is an ancient Native American Indian medicinal spring. Until 1838 and the Trail of Tears, Lithia Springs was a healing center for the southern Cherokee Nation. The last Cherokee chief that ruled over the springs was named Ama-Kanasta (Sweetwater) who took his name from the 'sweet water' that flowed from the ancient spring.

In 1882 the town of Lithia Springs, Georgia, was named after the natural Lithia water spring. So popular were the spring's medicinal waters that flowed from the spring that people came from long distances for its health benefits. The neighboring city of Austell, Georgia, was also founded due to the spring's popularity.

In 1887, Judge Bowden of Atlanta bought the springs with a group of investors and started bottling and selling Bowden Lithia spring water. In 1888 Bowden Lithia Spring Water Co. opened its offices at 131 West 42nd Street, New York City. That same year the Sweet Water Hotel, a 300-room luxury health resort, opened in Lithia Springs.[1] The Sweet Water Hotel and its famous Lithia spring water were so popular that Mark Twain, the Vanderbilts, and presidents Cleveland, Taft, McKinley, and Theodore Roosevelt were said to have visited the Resort. The amenities of the resort included a large bottle of Lithia Spring Water delivered to each room and the world-famous Lithia Vapor Baths.[1]

In 1887, Bowden Lithia Water won the "Gold Medal Par Excellence" at the Piedmont Exposition in Atlanta.

== Spring Source ==
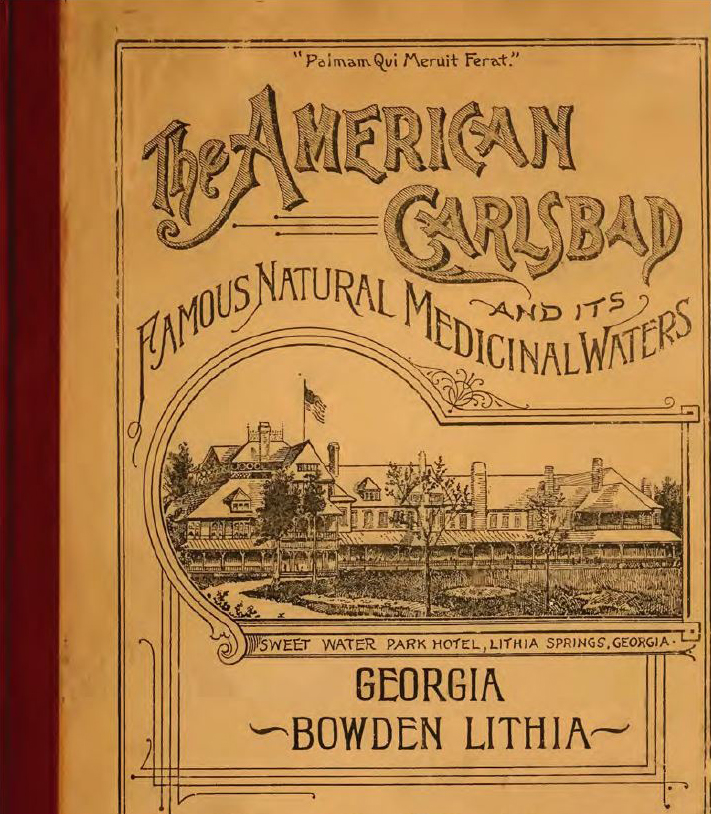
The American Carlsbad and its Famous Medicinal Waters 1890

The distinctive properties of Lithia Spring Water are attributable to its geological structure and topographic features. The spring source originates from deep within the subterranean earth where water slowly permeates through miles of granite rock fissures, becoming mineralized from contact with blue quartz-bearing granite rock. It emerges from Lithia Springs at a temperature of 14.44 °C (58 °F). The spring water's rare alkaline mineral composition, purity, and high ionic-mineral and naturally occurring lithium content have seldom varied since it was first bottled and sold in 1888. A unique and rare characteristic of the water's analysis is the total absence of nitrate as it indicates the spring water source is primordial and not fed by the outside earth's watershed. The spring produces very limited quantities, only a few thousand gallons a day.

== Product ==
Lithia Spring Water began to be packed in plastic bottles relatively recently; prior to 1984, it was packed exclusively in glass bottles. Due to breakage, high shipping and handling cost, it was decided that glass was not feasible so plastic bottles were adopted as a means to sell and market the water. In 2017 the company made a decision to abandon plastic bottles for an eco-friendly solution that was non-toxic, recyclable and friendly to the environment. An innovative non-toxic 5-liter eco-friendly spout bag was adopted that allows reduced shipping cost and environmental waste. To guarantee 100% food safety and freshness, the water is drawn directly from its ancient source in small batches to be sanitized. Antimicrobial nano-filtration technology (developed by NASA) and ultraviolet germicidal irradiation (UVGI) sanitation technologies assure all organic and biological contaminants are removed without altering the natural properties of the water.

== See also ==
- Lithia water
- Mineral water
- Lithia Springs, Georgia
- Austell, Georgia
