= Buffalo Springs Historical Archeological District =

Archaeological site in Virginia, United States

- U.S. National Register of Historic Places
- U.S. Historic district
- Virginia Landmarks Register
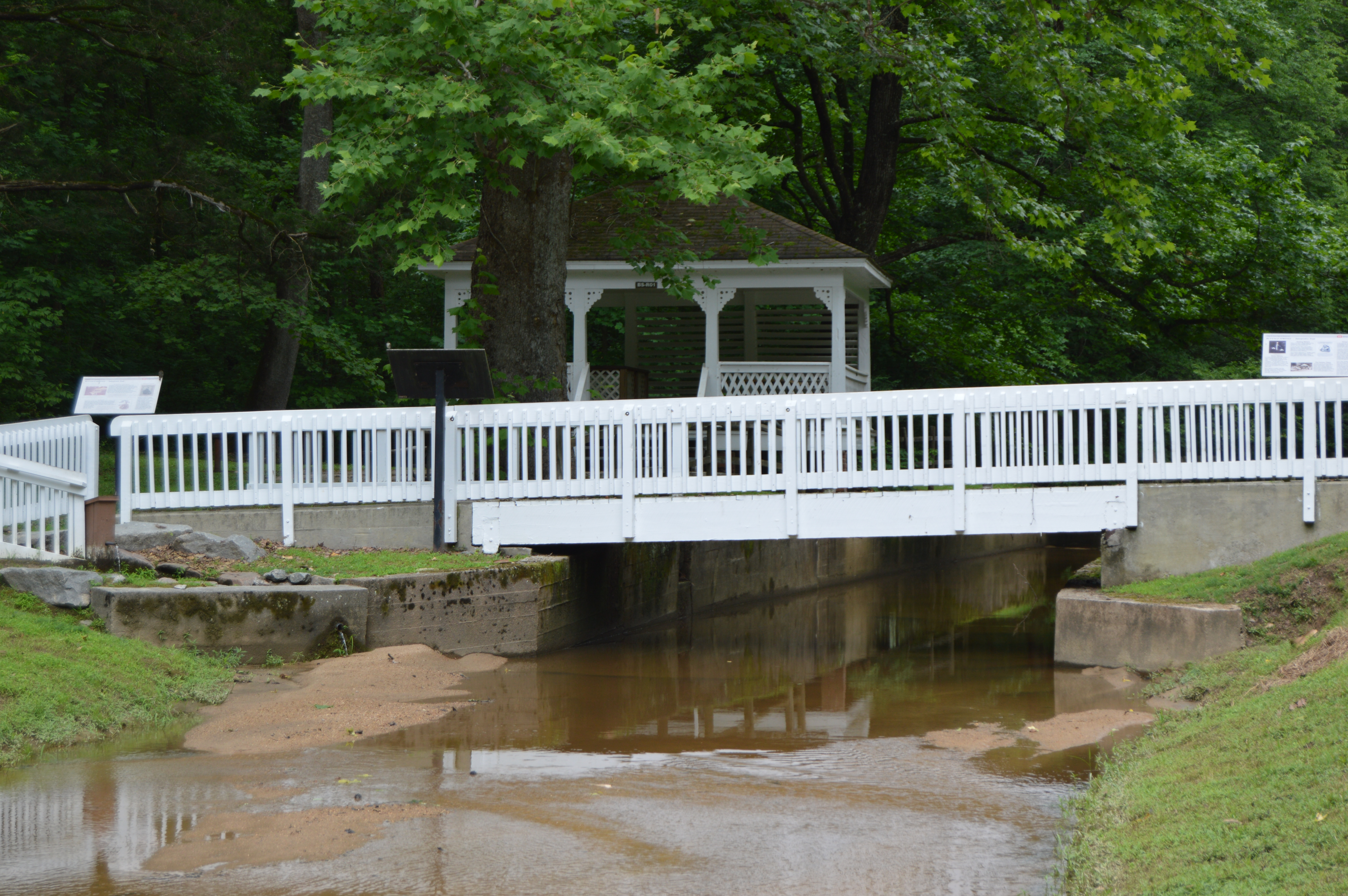
- Spring and gazebo at the site

- Location within Virginia Location within the United States
- Location: near Buffalo Springs, Virginia
- Coordinates: 36°38′54″N 78°39′45″W
- Area: 65 acres (26 ha)
- Built: 1811
- Architectural style: Colonial
- NRHP reference No.: 98000603
- VLR No.: 058-0005

Significant dates
- Added to NRHP: June 12, 1998
- Designated VLR: December 3, 1997

Buffalo Springs Historical Archeological District is a historic archaeological site and national historic district located near Buffalo Springs, Mecklenburg County, Virginia. It encompasses two contributing buildings, one contributing site, and 1 contributing structure associated with the Buffalo Lithia Springs or Buffalo Mineral Springs. The mineral or lithia springs at Buffalo are mentioned in the 1728 diary kept by William Byrd, whose party camped at this location while surveying the Virginia-North Carolina border. As early as 1817, an ordinary and tavern operated at Buffalo Springs. A resort/spa continued to grow through the mid-19th century. By 1885, Buffalo Springs water was being bottled and distributed nationally and in Europe. Buffalo Springs served as important place for local gathering and socializing through the first several decades of the 20th century. Some of the original property was acquired by the government for construction of the Kerr Reservoir in the late 1940s. The district is included within the Tobacco Heritage Trail.

It was listed on the National Register of Historic Places in 1998.
