= Sweetwater Creek (Chattahoochee River tributary) =

River in Georgia, United States

Coordinates: 33.71761°N 84.60549°W

Sweetwater creek in the fall

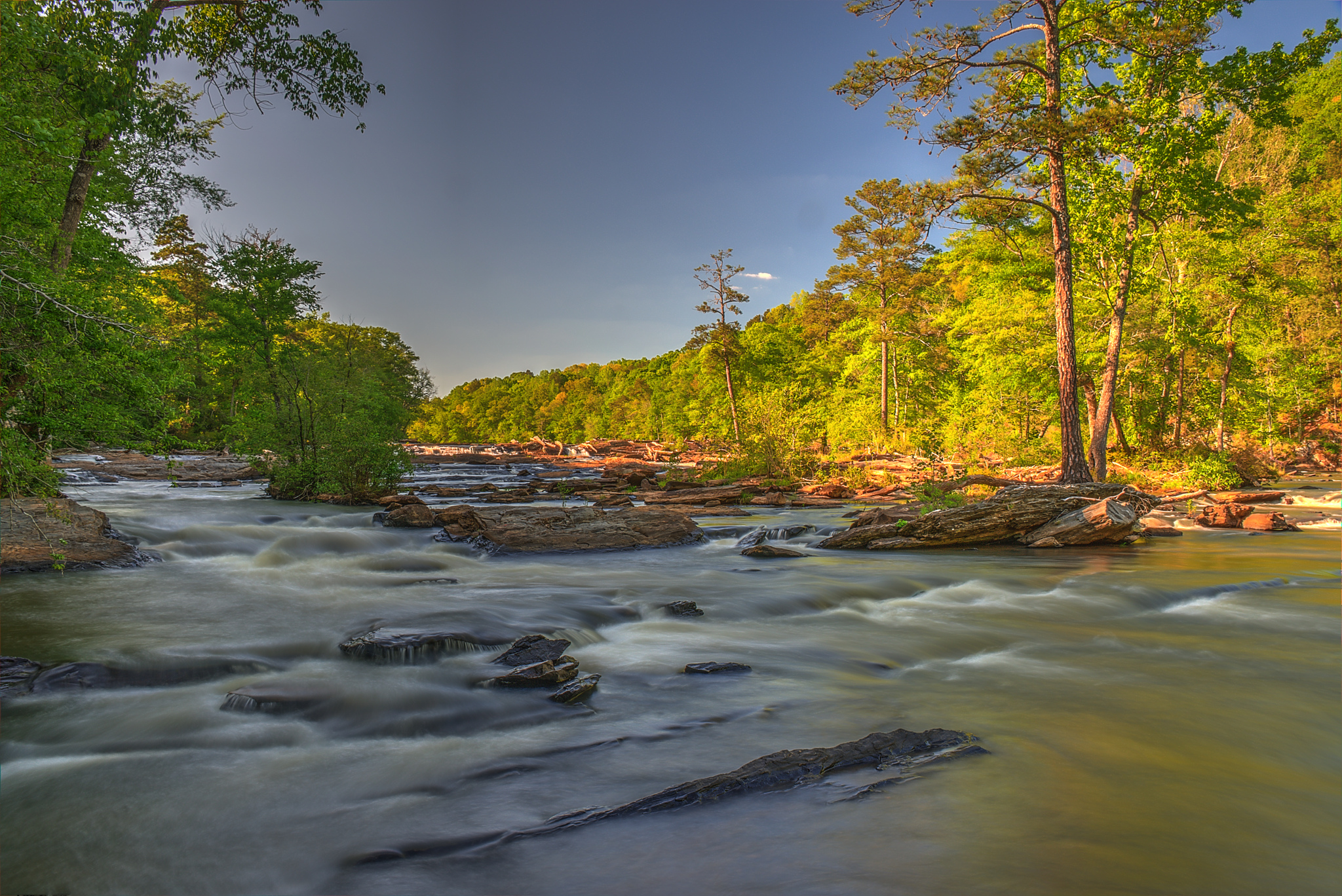
Sweetwater Creek

Sweetwater Creek is a 45.6-mile-long (73.4 km) stream in the U.S. state of Georgia, west of Atlanta. It begins in southwestern Paulding County, flowing generally eastward into southwestern Cobb County, then turning south into eastern Douglas County. It is a tributary of the Chattahoochee River, and near its end it is the centerpiece of Sweetwater Creek State Park.

Sweetwater Creek was named after AmaKanasta (Sweet Water), a Cherokee chieftain.

Since 1904 there has been a stream gauge near Austell (actually in Lithia Springs), at latitude 33°46'22"N, longitude 84°36'53"W. The watershed area above this point is 246 square miles (640 km^{2}). It is 857 feet (261 m) above mean sea level. The flood stage at this point is 10.0 feet (3.0 m). The identifier for this gauge is AUSG1.

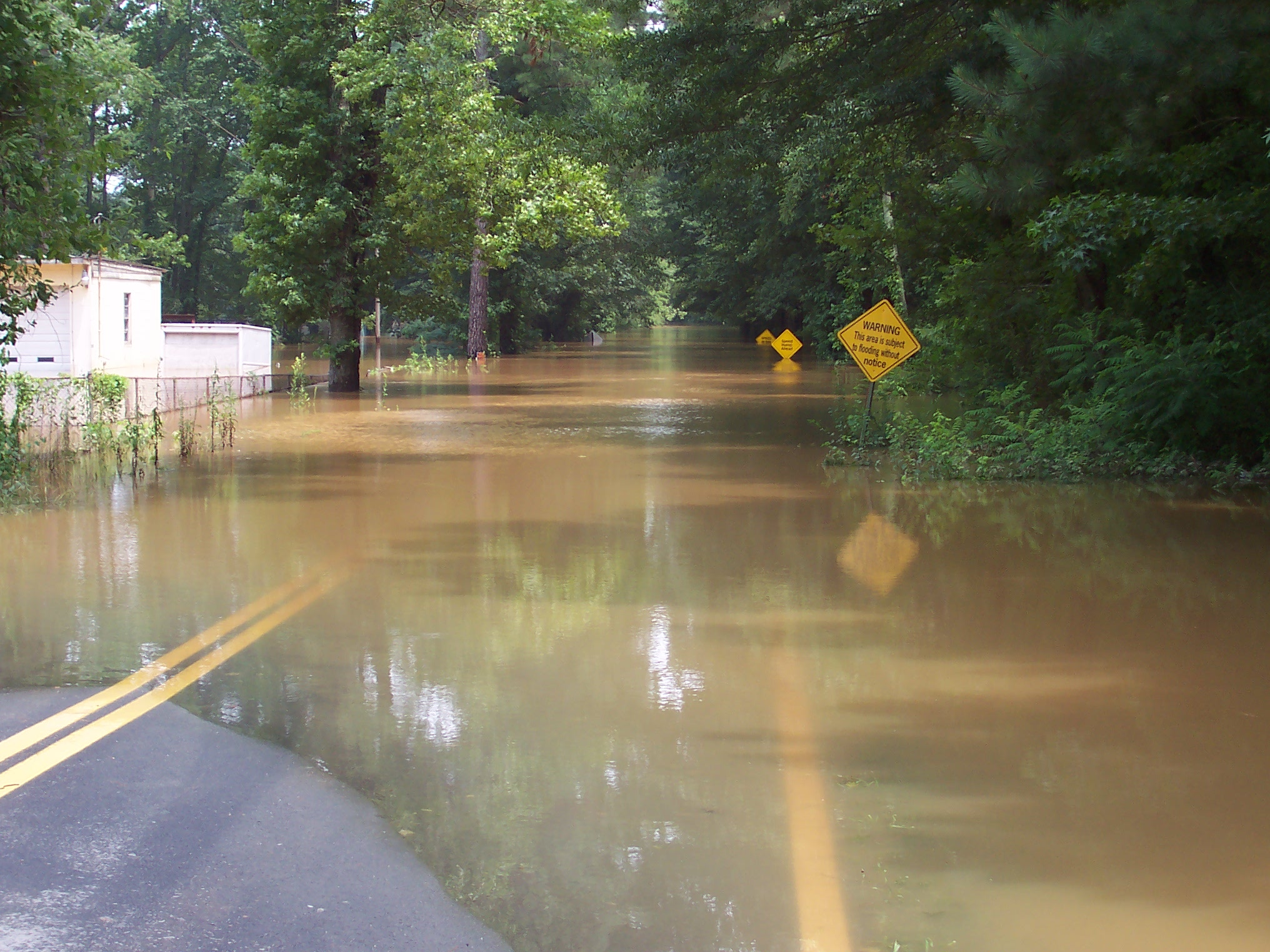
Flooding in 2005 in Lithia Springs

Major flooding occurred here in July 2005, after Hurricane Dennis dumped enormous amounts of rain across the Sweetwater Creek watershed, just after it had been soaked by Hurricane Cindy a few days before. The creek rose to one of its highest levels ever, flooding dozens of homes well beyond what was considered the 100-year flood plain. About 15 inches (380 mm) of rain fell at the gauge before it was ruined by the flood.

In late September 2009, the worst flooding ever occurred on the creek, after days of heavy rain. New records were set, and many roads were left underwater by it, including Interstate 20, which was closed west of I-285 for nearly three days. The USGS stated that it was greater than a 500-year flood (it does not try to make any greater estimates). The National Weather Service said the chances of having more than 10 inches (25 cm) of rain in a 24-hour period were less than 0.01% per year, making it a 10,000-year event.

The previous record flood was 20 feet (6.1 m) in July 1916. Base flow is around 2.7 feet (0.82 m).

== Tributaries ==
- Jack's Branch
- Beaver Run Creek
- Buttermilk Creek
- Noses Creek
  - Olley Creek
  - Ward Creek
- Powder Springs Creek
- Gothards Creek
- Mill Creek
- Mud Creek
- Little Creek
- Turkey Creek
