= Bradyn Swinson =

American football player (born 2002)

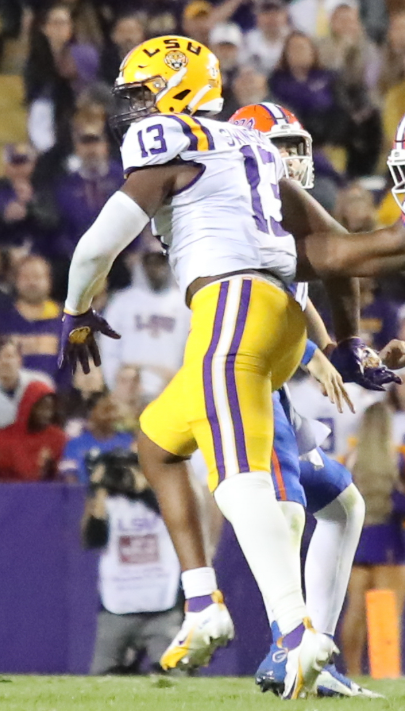
- Swinson with the LSU Tigers in 2023

No. 41 – Arizona Cardinals
- Position: Outside linebacker
- Roster status: Practice squad

Personal information
- Born: July 4, 2002 (age 24)
- Listed height: 6 ft 4 in (1.93 m)
- Listed weight: 255 lb (116 kg)

Career information
- High school: Chapel Hill (Douglasville, Georgia)
- College: Oregon (2020–2022); LSU (2023–2024)
- NFL draft: 2025: 5th round, 146th overall pick

Career history
- New England Patriots (2025); Pittsburgh Steelers (2026)*; Arizona Cardinals (2026–present)*
- * Offseason or practice squad member only

Awards and highlights
- Second-team All-SEC (2024)

Career NFL statistics as of 2025
- Tackles: 1
- Stats at Pro Football Reference

Bradyn Swinson (born July 4, 2002) is an American professional football outside linebacker for the Arizona Cardinals of the National Football League (NFL). He played college football for the LSU Tigers and Oregon Ducks. Swinson was selected by the New England Patriots in the fifth round of the 2025 NFL draft.

== Early life ==
Swinson attended Chapel Hill High School in Douglasville, Georgia. He was rated as a three-star recruit and committed to play college football for the Oregon Ducks over Arizona State, Florida State, Missouri and North Carolina.

== College career ==
=== Oregon ===
As a freshman in 2020 Swinson played in seven games where he made three tackles. In 2021, he notched 24 tackles with four being for a loss, three sacks, and two pass deflections. During week 2 of the 2021 season, Swinson made the start against Ohio State and had five tackles, a sack, and a pass deflection in the upset win, earning Pac-12 Conference defensive lineman of the week honors. In the 2022 season, he totaled eight tackles, with one and a half being for a loss. After the season, Swinson entered his name into the NCAA transfer portal.

=== LSU ===
Swinson transferred to play for the LSU Tigers. In his first season with LSU he notched 35 tackles with six and a half being for a loss, two sacks, five pass deflections, and two forced fumbles.

== Professional career ==
Pre-draft measurables
Height	Weight	Arm length	Hand span	Wingspan	20-yard shuttle	Three-cone drill
6 ft 3 5/8 in (1.92 m)	255 lb (116 kg)	33 3/8 in (0.85 m)	9 7/8 in (0.25 m)	6 ft 9 1/4 in (2.06 m)	4.33 s	7.13 s
All values from NFL Combine

=== New England Patriots ===
The New England Patriots selected Swinson with the 146th pick in the fifth round of the 2025 NFL draft. On August 26, 2025, he was released by the Patriots as part of final roster cuts and signed to the practice squad the following day. On November 15, he was signed to the active roster. and made his debut in Week 12 on November 23 against the Cincinnati Bengals, playing on special teams. Swinson played his first defensive snaps in Week 17 on December 28 against the New York Jets.

On August 30, 2026, Swinson was released by the Patriots as a part of final roster cuts.

=== Pittsburgh Steelers ===
On September 1, 2026, Swinson was signed to the Pittsburgh Steelers' practice squad. On October 6, he was released.

=== Arizona Cardinals ===
On October 20, 2026, Swinson was signed to the Arizona Cardinals practice squad.
