= Lithia Springs, Georgia =

- Unincorporated community Census-designated place
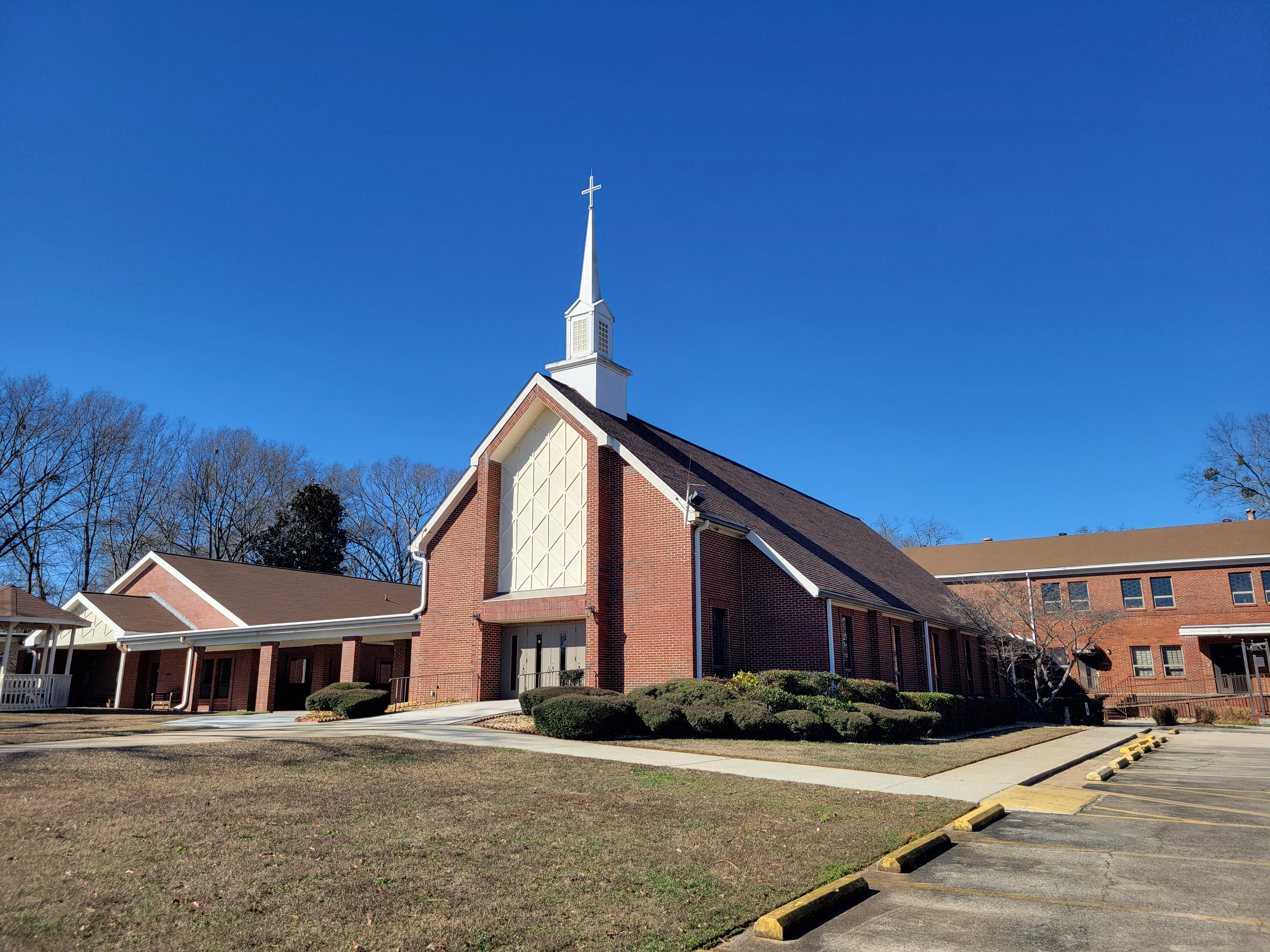
- Lithia Springs Methodist Church

- Location in Douglas County and the state of Georgia
- Coordinates: 33°47′50″N 84°39′22″W
- Country: United States
- State: Georgia
- County: Douglas

Area
  - Total: 13.49 sq mi (34.95 km^{2})
  - Land: 13.44 sq mi (34.81 km^{2})
  - Water: 0.050 sq mi (0.13 km^{2})
- Elevation: 1,043 ft (318 m)

Population (2020)
  - Total: 16,644
  - Density: 1,238.2/sq mi (478.09/km^{2})
- Time zone: UTC-5 (Eastern (EST))
  - Summer (DST): UTC-4 (EDT)
- ZIP Code: 30122
- Area codes: 770/678/470
- FIPS code: 13-46832
- GNIS feature ID: 0356358

Lithia Springs (/ˈlɪθiə/) is an unincorporated community and census-designated place, formerly incorporated as a city, located in northeastern Douglas County, Georgia, United States. As of the 2020 census, the community had a population of 16,644. The area is named for its historic lithia mineral water springs.

Incorporated in 1882, Lithia Springs was dissolved the first time in 1933. Lithia Springs became incorporated again in 1994, to be Douglas County's second completely internal municipality, but disincorporated again in 2000.

In 2000, the citizens voted (80% yea, 20% nay) on December 20 to dissolve the city charter and de-incorporate the city, transferring all assets to the county. The referendum that ended the town was part of the settlement in a lawsuit brought by city residents charging the city should be dissolved because it did not deliver enough services to justify its existence under state law. During its incorporation until 2000, the former city had five mayors.

Lithia Springs is assigned the United States Postal Service ZIP code of 30122.

== History ==
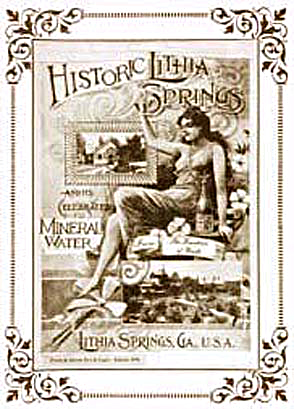
Vintage Lithia Spring Water poster, 1888

The history of the community began with Lithia Springs, a natural lithia water spring. So popular were the curative waters that flowed from Lithia Springs that people came for miles to drink it. The neighboring city of Austell was also founded due to the spring's popularity.

In 1887 Judge Bowden bought the springs with a group of investors and started bottling and selling Bowden lithia spring water. That same year the Sweet Water Hotel, a 300-room luxury health resort, opened in Lithia Springs. The hotel and its famous lithia spring water were so popular that Mark Twain, members of the Vanderbilt family, and Presidents Cleveland, Taft, McKinley and Theodore Roosevelt all enjoyed the many amenities of the resort, which included the world-famous Lithia Vapor Baths.

In 1888, the Piedmont Chautauqua Institute opened in Lithia Springs. Henry W. Grady, editor of the Atlanta Constitution, was the founder and gave the institute the motto "Enlightenment of the People". In 1888, over 30,000 tourists, sightseers, and health-seekers visited Lithia Springs.

The only remnants of this time that have survived are the natural springs and its historic lithia water under the name brand Lithia, which is still bottled and sold in restaurants and health food stores.

== Geography ==
Lithia Springs is located in the northeastern corner of Douglas County, bordered to the north and east by the Cobb County line and to the south by East County Line Road, Cedar Terrace Road, and Factory Shoals Road. Sweetwater Creek, a tributary of the Chattahoochee River, flows through the eastern part of the community, and Sweetwater Creek State Park is along its southern edge.

Some of the incorporated limits of Douglasville occupy some of the territory around Lithia Springs, along Interstate 20, Blair Bridge Road, Lee Road and Thornton Road.

According to the U.S. Census Bureau, the Lithia Springs CDP has a total area of 13.7 square miles (35.4 km^{2}), of which 13.6 square miles (35.2 km^{2}) is land and 0.050 square miles (0.13 km^{2}), or 0.37%, is water.

== Demographics ==
Historical population
Census	Pop.	Note	%±
1980	9,145		—
1990	11,403		24.7%
2000	2,072		−81.8%
2010	15,491		647.6%
2020	16,644		7.4%
U.S. Decennial Census; 1850-1870 1870-1880; 1890-1910 1920-1930; 1940 1950 1960; 1970 1980 1990; 2000 2010 2020

Lithia Springs was first listed as a census designated place in the 1980 U.S. census. After incorporation in 1994, it was delineated as a city with 2,072 people in the 2000 U.S. census. After the city was dissolved, it was redesignated as a CDP in the 2010 U.S. census.

=== Racial and ethnic composition ===
Lithia Springs CDP, Georgia – Racial and ethnic composition Note: the US Census treats Hispanic/Latino as an ethnic category. This table excludes Latinos from the racial categories and assigns them to a separate category. Hispanics/Latinos may be of any race.
Race / Ethnicity (NH = Non-Hispanic)	Pop 2000	Pop 2010	Pop 2020	% 2000	% 2010	% 2020
White alone (NH)	1,800	6,063	4,668	86.87%	39.14%	28.05%
Black or African American alone (NH)	199	6,122	7,978	9.60%	39.52%	47.93%
Native American or Alaska Native alone (NH)	9	41	29	0.43%	0.26%	0.17%
Asian alone (NH)	6	217	216	0.29%	1.40%	1.30%
Pacific Islander alone (NH)	1	37	24	0.05%	0.24%	0.14%
Some Other Race alone (NH)	0	30	95	0.00%	0.19%	0.57%
Mixed Race or Multi-Racial (NH)	25	257	570	1.21%	1.66%	3.42%
Hispanic or Latino (any race)	32	2,724	3,064	1.54%	17.58%	18.41%
Total	2,072	15,491	16,644	100.00%	100.00%	100.00%

=== 2020 census ===
As of the 2020 census, Lithia Springs had a population of 16,644. The median age was 35.1 years. 23.5% of residents were under the age of 18 and 11.2% of residents were 65 years of age or older. For every 100 females there were 93.0 males, and for every 100 females age 18 and over there were 91.1 males age 18 and over.

100.0% of residents lived in urban areas, while 0.0% lived in rural areas.

There were 6,710 households in Lithia Springs, including 4,159 families, of which 31.0% had children under the age of 18 living in them. Of all households, 33.2% were married-couple households, 23.7% were households with a male householder and no spouse or partner present, and 35.2% were households with a female householder and no spouse or partner present. About 32.7% of all households were made up of individuals and 7.3% had someone living alone who was 65 years of age or older.

There were 7,292 housing units, of which 8.0% were vacant. The homeowner vacancy rate was 1.8% and the rental vacancy rate was 7.5%.

== Parks ==
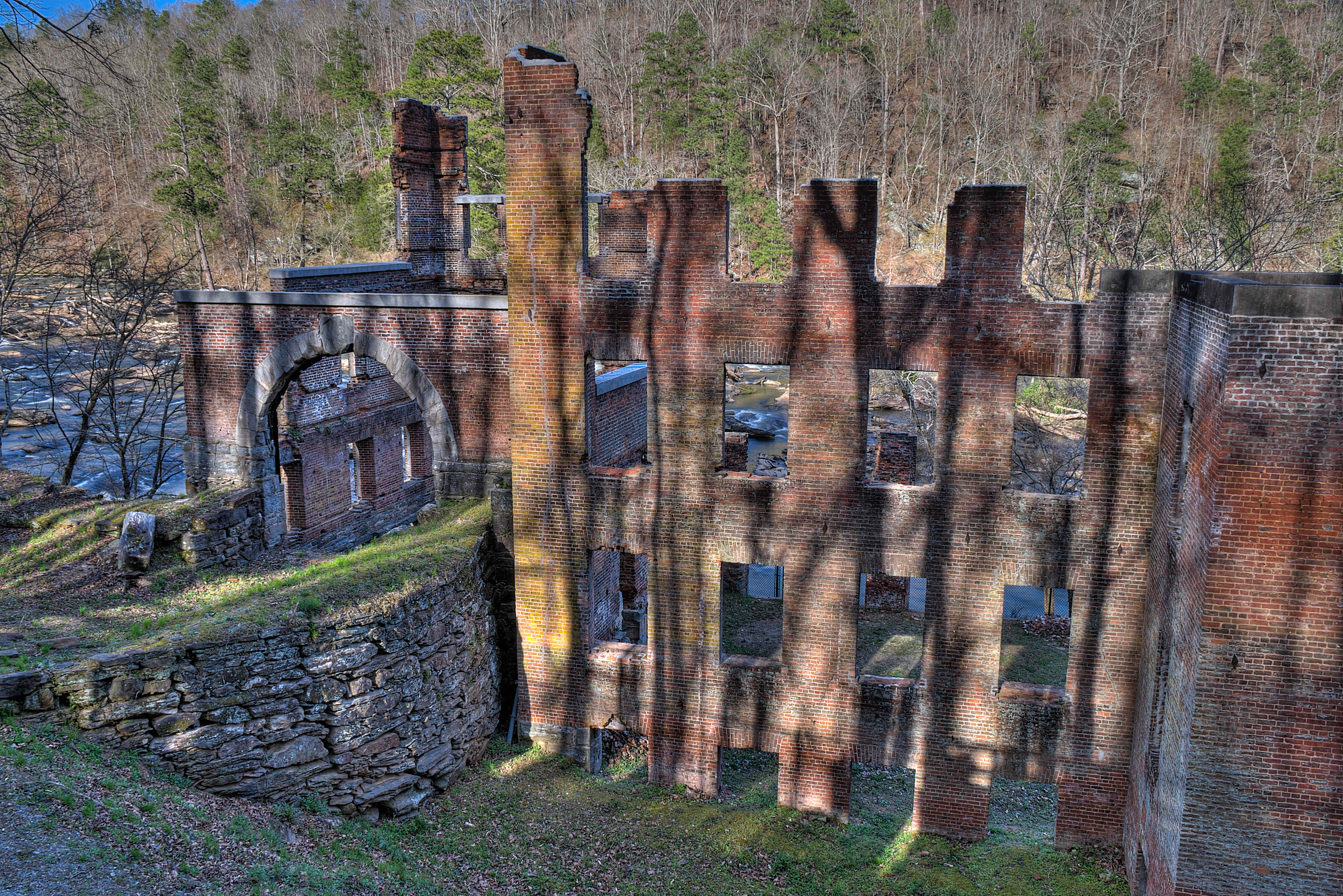
Ruins of New Manchester Mill

Sweetwater Creek State Park is Lithia Springs' main recreational area. The park is home to the George Sparks Reservoir, owned and maintained by the City of East Point. It is home to hiking trails, picnic pavilions, playgrounds and the ruins of the Manchester Mill, a mill destroyed by Sherman's Atlanta Campaign in 1864.

Several movies have filmed scenes in this park, including Avengers: Infinity War, The Hunger Games, The Hunger Games: Catching Fire, The Hunger Games: Mockingjay Part 1 and No Good Deed.

In 2005, the remnants of Hurricane Dennis damaged the bridge over the reservoir, the main road into and out of the park. The bridge was rebuilt and the road was reopened in 2006. The park is located off Mount Vernon Road in Lithia Springs.

Woodrow Wilson Park/Lithia Springs Girls Ball Field is a small park surrounded by homes and apartments. The park is situated next to Sweetwater Creek. When heavy rains occurred in the area, the park was prone to flooding. It was flooded during the 2009 Southeastern United States floods. It was scheduled to be rebuilt in 2011, and operates today. The park is located off Mount Vernon Road near Skyview Drive.

== Schools ==
Douglas County School System is the sole school district in the county.

Lithia Springs is home to six schools operated by the school district:

- Annette Winn Elementary off US. Hwy 78
- Lithia Springs Elementary off Junior High Dr.
- Sweetwater Elementary off E. County Line Rd.
- Turner Middle School next to Lithia Elementary
- Chestnut Log Middle School off Hwy. 92
- Lithia Springs Comprehensive High School across the street from Sweetwater Elementary

== Library ==
Lithia Springs has one library, Betty C. Hagler Public Library, also known as Lithia Springs Public Library.

== Economy ==
There are multiple datacenters in Lithia Springs.

== Notable people ==
- Ruth Blair - first woman state historian of Georgia; grew up here
- Sawyer Gipson-Long - professional baseball player
- Walton Goggins - moved to Lithia Springs at a young age and grew up in the area
- Lil Nas X - rapper; born in Lithia Springs
- Elana Meyers - Olympian; attended Lithia Springs High School
- Calvin Pace - NFL player; attended Lithia Springs High School 1994–1998

== See also ==
- Lithia Spring Water, a brand of bottled natural lithia water sourced from Lithia Springs since 1888
