= Mineral water =

Drinking water from a mineral spring

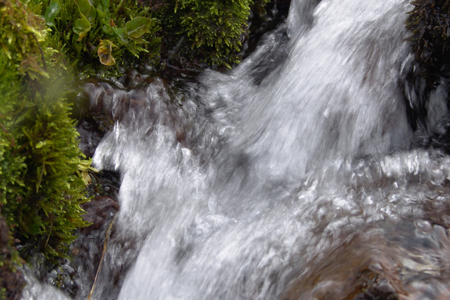
A mineral water spring at Sabalan Mountain, Iran

Mineral water is water from a mineral spring that contains various minerals, such as salts and sulfur compounds. It is usually still, but may be sparkling (carbonated/effervescent).

Traditionally, mineral waters were used or consumed at their spring sources, often referred to as "taking the waters" or "taking the cure", at places such as spas, baths and wells.

Today, it is far more common for mineral water to be bottled at the source for distributed consumption. Travelling to the mineral water site for direct access to the water is now uncommon, and in many cases not possible because of exclusive commercial ownership rights. More than 4,000 brands of mineral water are commercially available worldwide.

In many places the term "mineral water" is colloquially used to mean any bottled carbonated water or soda water, as opposed to tap water.

== Composition ==
The U.S. Food and Drug Administration classifies mineral water as water containing at least 250 parts per million total dissolved solids (TDS), originating from a geologically and physically protected underground water source. No minerals may be added to this water.

In the European Union, bottled water may be called mineral water when it is bottled at the source and has undergone minimal treatment. Permitted is the removal of iron, manganese, sulfur and arsenic through decantation, filtration or treatment with ozone-enriched air, insofar as this treatment does not alter the composition of the water as regards the essential constituents which give it its properties. No additions are permitted except for carbon dioxide, which may be added, removed or re-introduced by exclusively physical methods. No disinfection treatment is permitted, nor is the addition of any bacteriostatic agents.

The more calcium and magnesium ions that are dissolved in water, the harder it is said to be; water with few dissolved calcium and magnesium ions is described as being soft.

== Health impact ==
A review by the World Health Organization found slightly reduced cardiovascular disease mortality from consuming harder water with higher mineral amounts, with magnesium and possibly calcium being the most likely contributors.

However, mineral amounts vary greatly among different brands of mineral water, and tap water can contain similar or greater amounts of minerals. One study found that the median mineral content of North American mineral waters was lower than for tap water, though values varied widely among both groups. Additionally, other dietary sources of minerals are available and may be more cost effective and less environmentally impactful than bottled mineral water.

== See also ==
- Bottled water
- Drinking water
- Lithia water
- Mineral spa
- Water quality

== Sources ==
- Kozisek, Frantisek; Rosborg, Ingegerd, eds. (2020). Drinking Water Minerals and Mineral Balance Importance, Health Significance, Safety Precautions. Springer International Publishing. ISBN 9783030180348.

== Bibliography ==
- LaMoreaux, Philip E.; Tanner, Judy T, eds. (2001), Springs and bottled water of the world: Ancient history, source, occurrence, quality and use, Berlin, Heidelberg, New York: Springer-Verlag, ISBN 3-540-61841-4
