= Lithium bicarbonate =

Names
- Preferred IUPAC name Lithium hydrogen carbonate

Identifiers
CAS Number	5006-97-3
3D model (JSmol)	Interactive image
ChemSpider	7969455
PubChem CID	23678576
UNII	K73H191F56
CompTox Dashboard (EPA)	DTXSID80904557
- InChI: InChI=1S/CH2O3.Li/c2-1(3)4;/h(H2,2,3,4);/q;+1/p-1 Key: HQRPHMAXFVUBJX-UHFFFAOYSA-M
- SMILES: [Li+].C(=O)(O)[O-]

Properties
Chemical formula	LiHCO_{3}
Molar mass	67.96 g·mol^{-1}
- Except where otherwise noted, data are given for materials in their standard state (at 25 °C [77 °F], 100 kPa). Infobox references

Lithium bicarbonate (LiHCO_{3}) is a compound of lithium, hydrogen, carbon and oxygen.

== See also ==
- Lithium carbonate
