= Buffalo Springs, North Dakota =

- Unincorporated community
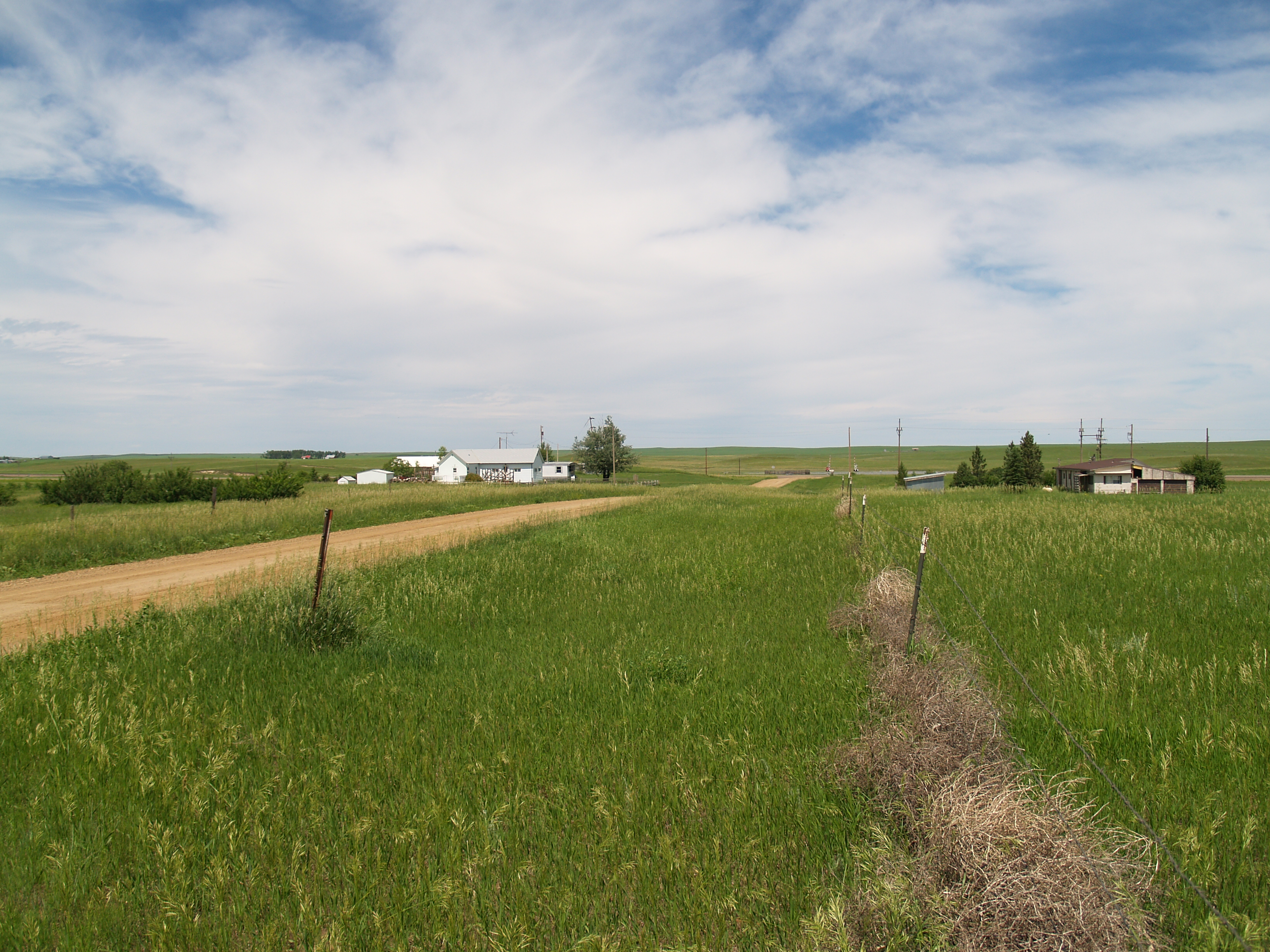
- Houses in Buffalo Springs

- Location within North Dakota Location within the United States
- Coordinates: 46°10′30″N 103°14′06″W
- Country: United States
- State: North Dakota
- County: Bowman
- Elevation: 2,861 ft (872 m)
- Time zone: UTC-7 (Mountain (MST))
  - Summer (DST): UTC-6 (MDT)
- Area code: 701
- GNIS feature ID: 1033837

Buffalo Springs is an unincorporated community in Bowman County, North Dakota, United States. Buffalo Springs is located on U.S. Route 12 and the BNSF Railway, 7.7 miles (12.4 km) east of Bowman.

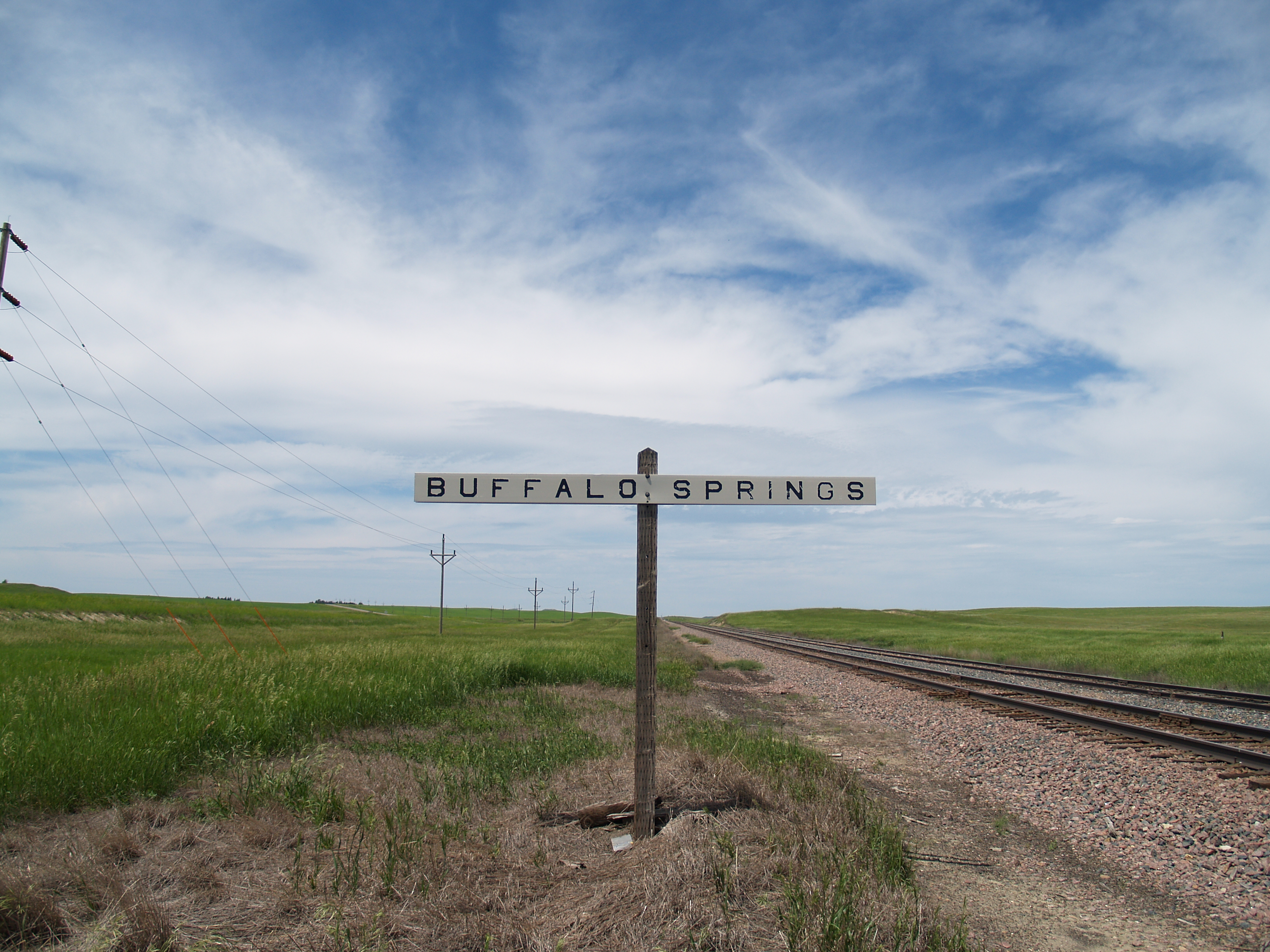
Sign for Buffalo Springs along the railroad

== History ==
The population was 66 in 1940.

== Climate ==
According to the Köppen Climate Classification system, Buffalo Springs has a semi-arid climate, abbreviated "BSk" on climate maps.
