= Douglas County School District =

School district in Georgia, U.S.

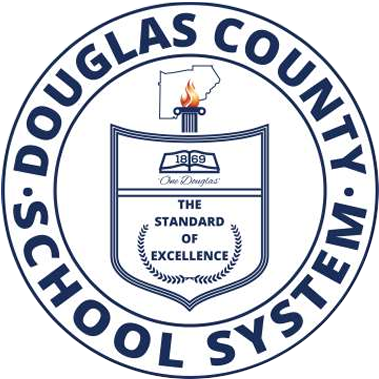

Address
- 11490 Veterans Memorial Highway Douglasville, Georgia, 30134-1539; United States

District information
- Grades: Pre-Kindergarten – 12
- Superintendent: Trent North
- Accreditations: Southern Association of Colleges and Schools; Georgia Accrediting Commission; AdvancED
- NCES District ID: 1301860

Students and staff
- Students: 25,802 (2022–23)
- Teachers: 1,682.80 (FTE)
- Staff: 1,613.10 (FTE)
- Student–teacher ratio: 15.33

Other information
- Telephone: (770) 651-2000
- Website: dcssga.org

Douglas County School District is a public school district in Douglas County, Georgia, U.S., based in Douglasville. Its boundaries are those of the county, and it serves the communities of Austell, Douglasville, Lithia Springs, the Douglas County portion of Villa Rica, and Winston. The Douglas County School District is the seventeenth largest district in Georgia.

The school district's central administrative offices are in Douglas County, where graduates can access their records and transcripts, and where all major decisions about the schools are made.

== District Leadership ==
Superintendent: Trent North

Chief Academic Officer: Pam Nail

Athletics: James Strong

Financial Services: Greg Denney

Community Relations: Karen Stroud & Portia Lake

Asst. Superintendent of Personnel & Policy: Dr. Michelle Ruble

Asst. Superintendent of District Operations: Kwame Carr

Human Resources: Jill De Priest

Procurement: Becky Eigel

Nutrition Services: Danielle Scott-Freeman

Student Services: Mike Coxs

Technology: Todd Hindmon

Transportation: E.W Tolbert

== Board of education ==
The board of education consists of five members representing areas of the county. The members are elected at large and serve a term of four years. The board of education meets twice monthly, except during January and July, on the first and third Tuesdays. Current members include:

=== Members ===
Tracy Rookard-Chair/District 3

Michelle Simmons-Vice Chair/District 4

Devetrion Caldwell-District 1

D.T. Jackson-District 2

Jeff Morris- District 5

== Schools ==
As of 2026, the Douglas County School District has nineteen elementary schools, eight middle schools, and five high schools.

=== Elementary schools ===
- Annette Winn Elementary School
- Arbor Station Elementary School
- Beulah Elementary School
- Bill Arp Elementary School
- Bright Star Elementary School
- Chapel Hill Elementary School
- Dorsett Shoals Elementary School
- Eastside Elementary School
- Factory Shoals Elementary School
- Holly Springs Elementary School
- Lithia Springs Elementary School
- Mason Creek Elementary School
- Mirror Lake Elementary School
- Mt. Carmel Elementary School
- New Manchester Elementary School
- North Douglas Elementary School
- South Douglas Elementary School
- Sweetwater Elementary School
- Winston Elementary School

=== Middle schools ===
- Chapel Hill Middle School
- Chestnut Log Middle School
- Factory Shoals Middle School
- Fairplay Middle School
- Mason Creek Middle School
- Stewart Middle School
- Turner Middle School
- Yeager Middle School

=== High schools ===
- Alexander High School
- Chapel Hill High School
- Douglas County High School
- Lithia Springs High School
- New Manchester High School

=== Other ===
- Brighten Academy
- College & Career Institute
- Academy at CCI
- Performance Learning System (PLC)
- Virtual Academy

== Specific schools ==
=== South Douglas Elementary School ===
The school is located in a community named Fairplay. The principal is Mr. Duffey and the school has a total of 538 students in grades Pre-K through 5th. The new South Douglas building was built in 1992. This was the first school in Douglas County to start an after-school program and the first to use the Reading First Program.

The mascot is the Bear Cub.

=== Chapel Hill Middle School ===
Chapel Hill Middle School is located on Chapel Hill Rd. The school has been named as one of the top middle schools in Georgia. The school colors are purple and gold. The mascot is a piano The school has been named a "Lighthouse School to Watch". Chapel Hill has advanced/gifted classes.

==== Administrators ====
Principal: Catherine Westbrook

Assistant Principal: Terrance Boynton

Assistant Principal: Michael Hopping

Assistant Principal: Christy Gragg

=== Douglas County High School ===
This was the first high school to open in Douglas County, built in the early 1880s. Most of the school was rebuilt due to a fire in the early 1990s, reopening in 1992. It has over 2000 students and offers over 40 clubs, extracurricular activities, and sports. The school offers the International Baccalaureate Program and a graphic arts program.

The school's teams are the Douglas County Tigers, which compete in the Georgia High School Association AAAAAAA classification. The school fields teams in baseball, basketball, cheerleading, cross country, fast-pitch softball, football, golf, soccer, swimming, tennis, track and field, volleyball, and wrestling.

The school's colors are navy blue and gold.

Administration: Andre Weaver, Principal Tosha Wright, Assistant Principal Grant Fossum, Assistant Principal

Current Mascot: Tiger

=== Alexander High School ===
Built to relieve overpopulation between Douglas County High School and Lithia Springs High School, Alexander High School opened for the 1986–1987 school year. The school's namesake, Robert S. Alexander, was an employee of the Douglas County School System.

Alexander High School teams are known as the Alexander Cougars and compete in the Georgia High School Association AAAA classification. The school fields teams in baseball, basketball, cheerleading, cross country, fast-pitch softball, football, golf, soccer, swimming, tennis, track and field, volleyball, and wrestling.

The school's colors are red and black.

=== Lithia Springs High School ===
Lithia Springs High School is a public high school located on East County Line Road, in Lithia Springs. It is also known as Lithia Springs Comprehensive High School. It was the second high school to open in the Douglas County School District. Until December 2, 1975, the county had only one high school, Douglas County High School, which had opened in the late 1880s. By 1974 the secondary school population had grown to over 3,000 students, far too many for the existing buildings of DCHS to accommodate in a regular school day. Beginning in August 1974, the county had to resort to double sessions. This meant that those students designated to attend Lithia Springs HS would attend the afternoon session, starting at about 11:00 and going until about 5:30. Construction and weather problems delayed the grand opening of LSHS until December, 1975.
