= Lithia Springs High School =

Public high school in Lithia Springs, Georgia, United States

Location
- 2520 East County Line Road; Lithia Springs, Georgia 30122; United States; 33.7542°N 84.6633°W

Information
- Type: Public high school
- Motto: Freedom Through Education
- Established: 1975
- Principal: Felicia Jones
- Staff: 86.60 (FTE)
- Grades: 9–12
- Enrollment: 1,564 (2023-2024)
- Student to teacher ratio: 18.06
- Campus: Suburban
- Colors: Green and gold
- Athletics: Georgia High School Association
- Mascot: Lions
- Website: Lithia Springs High School

Lithia Springs High School is a public high school located on East County Line Road, in Lithia Springs, Georgia, United States. It is also known as Lithia Springs Comprehensive High School. It was the second high school to open in the Douglas County School District.

== History ==
Until December 2, 1975, Douglas County had only one high school, Douglas County High School, which opened in the late 1930s. By 1974 the secondary school population had grown to over 3,000 students, far too many for the existing buildings of DCHS to accommodate in a regular school day. Beginning in August 1974, the county had to resort to double sessions. This meant that those students designated to attend Lithia Springs High School would attend the afternoon session, starting at about 11:00 and going until about 5:30. Construction and weather problems delayed the opening of LSHS until December 1975.

== STEM Magnet Program ==
Lithia Springs High School is home to Douglas County's Science, Technology, Engineering, and Mathematics (STEM) Magnet program. Use of Project Lead the Way's (PLTW) specialized curriculum in Biomedical Science, Computer Science, and Engineering distinguishes the STEM Magnet program from all other STEM pathways offered in DCSS. Three separate agencies, each with its own rigorous and comprehensive certification process, have recognized the quality and value of the LSHS STEM program: the Georgia Department of Education (2016), Cognia Accreditation, formally AdvancED (2017), and the National Institute for STEM Education (2019). With personalized learning opportunities, STEM students are instructed to work collaboratively on complex, open-ended tasks. Through an inquiry-based approach for building knowledge and blended learning experiences, instructors develop a more inclusive, interactive and creative approach to teaching. As a result, students develop self confidence, independence, and pride in their accomplishments as they use newly acquired content knowledge to explore, design, test, modify, and solve problems which exist in the real world. Graduates of the STEM program satisfy a diverse array of rigorous expectations, including AP and Dual Enrollment courses, to develop a comprehensive portfolio and résumé for their post-secondary endeavors.

== Demographics ==
- teachers: 86.1 (FTE)

Students by grade:

- Grade 9: 488
- Grade 10: 433
- Grade 11: 347
- Grade 12: 299

== Notable alumni ==
- Kevin Abstract, director, producer, rapper
- Walton Goggins, actor, best known for his roles on the FX Networks series The Shield and Justified
- Lil Nas X, singer/rapper
- Elana Meyers, Olympic bobsledding bronze medalist in 2010, silver medalist in 2014, and silver medalist in 2018
- Calvin Pace, outside linebacker, New York Jets #97
- Josh Scogin, rock musician
