= Lithia water =

Type of mineral water

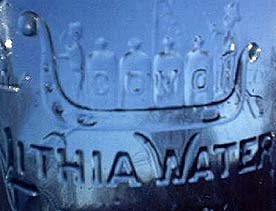
Lithia Spring Water bottle, 1888

Lithia water is defined as a type of mineral water characterized by the presence of lithium salts (such as the carbonate, chloride, or citrate of lithium). Natural lithia mineral spring waters are rare, and there are few commercially bottled lithia water products.

Between the 1880s and World War I, the consumption of bottled lithia mineral water was popular, with all kinds of health claims attached to it starting with a misguided understanding of gout. One of the first commercially sold lithia waters in the United States was bottled at Lithia Springs, Georgia, in 1888. During this era, there was such a demand for lithia water that there was a proliferation of bottled lithia water products. However, only a few were natural lithia spring waters. Most of the bottled lithia water brands added lithium bicarbonate to spring water and called it lithia water. With the start of World War I and the formation of the new US government food safety agency, mineral water bottlers were under scrutiny. The new agency posted large fines against mineral water bottlers for mislabeled, misrepresented and adulterated products. These government actions and their publicity, along with public works that made clean tap water readily accessible, caused the American public to lose confidence and interest in bottled mineral water.

Lithia water contains various lithium salts, either natural or added. Mineral acid salts such as lithium bicarbonate do occur naturally; organic acid salts such as lithium citrate only occur after intentional addition because organic acids do not naturally occur in spring water.

The lithium health craze also affected soft drinks. An early version of Coca-Cola available in pharmacies' soda fountains called Lithia Coke was a mixture of Coca-Cola syrup and Bowden lithia spring water. The soft drink 7 Up was named "7Up Lithiated Lemon Soda" when it was formulated in 1929 because it claimed to contain lithium citrate. The beverage was a patent medicine marketed as a cure for hangover. In 1936 the federal government forced the manufacturer to remove a number of health claims, and because "lithium was not an actual ingredient", the name was changed to just "7 Up" in 1937. Many sources repeat an incorrect version of the 7 Up story where the name is "Bib-Label Lithiated Lemon-Lime Soda" and the removal happened in 1948 due to a Food and Drug Administration ban.

== Notable brands ==
- Lithia Spring Water, a brand of bottled natural lithia water sourced from Lithia Springs, Georgia, USA, since 1888
- Londonderry Lithia, a brand of bottled lithia water produced during the late 19th and early 20th centuries
- Buffalo Lithia Water, a brand of bottled lithia water sourced from Buffalo Lithia Springs, Virginia
- Gerolsteiner, a natural sparkling water that lists 0.13 ppm lithium in its analysis

== See also ==
- Ashland, Oregon, where lithia water is piped to a public water fountain established as an attempt to draw tourists during the lithia water heyday.
- Lithium (medication)
