= Douglas County High School (Douglasville, Georgia) =

Public high school in Douglasville, Georgia, United States

Location
- 8705 Campbellton St. Douglasville, Georgia 30134-2202; United States; 33.743164°N 84.743547°W

Information
- School type: Public
- Established: 1937
- School district: Douglas County School District
- CEEB code: 111110
- Principal: Kenja Parks
- Teaching staff: 112.40 (FTE)
- Grades: 9–12
- Enrollment: 1,907 (2023–2024)
- Student to teacher ratio: 16.97
- Colors: Navy blue and gold
- Athletics: GHSA 3-AAAAAA
- Mascot: Tiger
- Yearbook: DOCOHAN
- Website: Douglas County High School

Douglas County High School, also known as Douglas County Comprehensive High School, is a public high school in Douglasville, Georgia, United States. It was the first high school to open in the Douglas County School District.

== History ==
Douglas County, Georgia was established in 1870 during the Reconstruction of the South. The first public high school for the county was built in 1880 on the present day site of the National Guard Armory in Douglasville. This schoolhouse was used up for most of the county's high school needs until 1937, when President Roosevelt's New Deal WPA program designated that a new school would be built, named Douglasville High School.

Over the years, the name was changed to Douglas County High School, and the small, twelve-classroom building was added to and built up around. The first major change came when the wooden framed auditorium caught fire and left the building exposed. Later the original building was converted into the administrative building, and another building was added to it. This was the Banks Building, which added a tremendous amount of classrooms to the school. A small elementary school was built behind the high, school called Warren Dorris Elementary. As the high school population grew, the elementary school was attached with a breezeway to the next building. A small gymnasium and a football playing field were also added.

After the first buildings were completed, there was a gap between the next renovations, but eventually the fourth building was added to the campus. The Cloer Building was added as a science building, and housed the school's mechanic and auto shop. This building was left freestanding (unlike the other three academia-centered buildings) and is no longer home to the mechanics program, as it was disbanded to make room for other programs. A new gymnasium was added to the campus. This new gym was much larger than the first, and was equipped with air conditioning. It is used today as the school's primary gym for most physical education classes.

In the early 1990s, the original building of the school, the Mashburn Building, was mostly destroyed in a fire. A janitor from the school was consequently arrested and convicted of arson as well as child endangerment. The school rebuilt the Mashburn Building and added a new section of the building that houses the fine arts department. Later that decade, the connecting hallway of the Mashburn and Banks buildings collapsed during a major storm. It was quickly replaced.

The school now holds the title of oldest, largest, and most grossly populated of all the schools in the county. It is the only school in the county to offer the magnet International Baccalaureate Diploma Programme.

In the fall of 2017, the third season of the TV series Scream was filmed at the school. During this period, a viral video was recorded on campus, featuring actress Keke Palmer and rapper Tyga using with inappropriate language. The video stirred a controversy with upset parents.

== Campus ==
The Douglas County High School campus is made up of several facilities:

Academics:

- The Mashburn Building (rooms 100s) is the original building of the school. It houses the main office, administrative offices, attendance office, cafeteria, theater, media center, and band and chorus classes.
- The Banks Building (rooms 200s) is the school's second building. The classes consist of foreign language, history/social studies, English/literature, and the journalism program.
- The Warren Dorris Building (rooms 300s) is the school's third building, and is split up into two parts, Upper and Lower. The Upper Warren Dorris is the old math hall and was the Freshman Hall between 2007 and 2009. It was converted back to math classes for the 2009–2010 school year. The Lower Warren Dorris houses the science classes. Both parts are connected by a short hall that houses business classes.
- The Cloer Building (rooms 400s) is the school's fourth building. It houses technical education classes, healthcare, and science. The building formerly housed the auto shop, but the garage was converted into science classrooms.
- The Steele Building (Jim Steele Freshman Academy, rooms 9100-9300s) is a three-story building adjacent to the Lower Warren Dorris and school practice field/track. The basement level houses computer labs and the school's JROTC rooms and storage. The ground floor has a faculty office, math, literature, science, social studies, and health classrooms, and a large multi-purpose room. The third floor is full of classrooms (math, literature, science, social studies, and health). It was built during the 2014–2015 school year and houses most of the school's freshman and sophomore International Baccalaureate classrooms.

Athletics:

- The Primary Gym is the second freestanding gymnasium at DCHS. It is used year-round for all major sports activities and physical education classes.
- The Secondary Gym was the first freestanding gymnasium on the campus. It is not used during the summer months because it lacks conditioning. It also houses the JROTC shooting range and is used primarily for basketball in the winter months.
- Coach Jimmy Johnson Stadium is the major outdoor athletics arena. It consists of the Tolbert Family Training Center, concession stands, and home and visiting stands for spectators. During the football season it is used primarily by the football team, cheerleaders, flag football team, and The Incomparable DC Tiger Marching Band. During the soccer season, it is used by the soccer team. The field was converted from natural grass to artificial turf during the fall of 2016.
- The Tolbert Family Training Center is the football training center in Coach Jimmy Johnson Stadium. It houses the school's weight rooms and storage for the football team. A small office is part of the complex.
- The track and practice field is used for track competitions and for practice for all athletic activities, including football, soccer, cheerleading, marching band, and track. In 2015, the track was repaved.
- The Adams Building is a freestanding single room that is used as the school's wrestling center. It has previously been used as a teacher work room, storage, and band room.

== Curriculum ==
In addition to the standard Georgia high school curriculum, Douglas County High School offers many Advanced Placement courses, French and Spanish courses, and an International Baccalaureate Diploma Program. Students may also attend courses at local colleges during the school day for college credit in the Dual Enrollment program. The school has a fine arts department consisting of band, guitar, jazz band, musical ensembles, choral ensemble, theatre troupe, visual arts, and music appreciation courses.

Douglas County High School has held the record for the most students to receive the International Skills diploma seal. since the Seal began.

== Notable alumni ==
- Deuce Alexander, college football wide receiver for the Ole Miss Rebels
- Brett Campbell, former professional baseball player (Washington Nationals)
- Daniel Davison, drummer for Christian metalcore band Norma Jean
- Ricky Dobbs, Naval Academy quarterback; record holder for touchdowns by a quarterback
- Terry Harper, professional baseball player with the Atlanta Braves, Pittsburgh Pirates, and Detroit Tigers, 1980–1987
- Nimay Ndolo, media personality and influencer. Awardee of Rolling Stone and Time 100 influential creators
- Taylor Phillips, professional baseball player with the Chicago Cubs, Milwaukee Braves, Philadelphia Phillies, and Chicago White Sox (1956–1963); won the 1957 World Series with the Braves
- Glenn Richardson, Speaker of the Georgia House of Representatives
- Kasha Terry, Atlanta Dream (WNBA) player
- Mike Tolbert, professional American football player (Carolina Panthers)
- Kani Walker, NFL football cornerback (Buffalo Bills)
- Mario West, former NBA player
- Ron Young, former POW; contestant on The Amazing Race 7
