= Buffalo Springs, Nelson County, Virginia =

Unincorporated community in Virginia, United States

Coordinates: 37°36′35″N 78°51′43″W

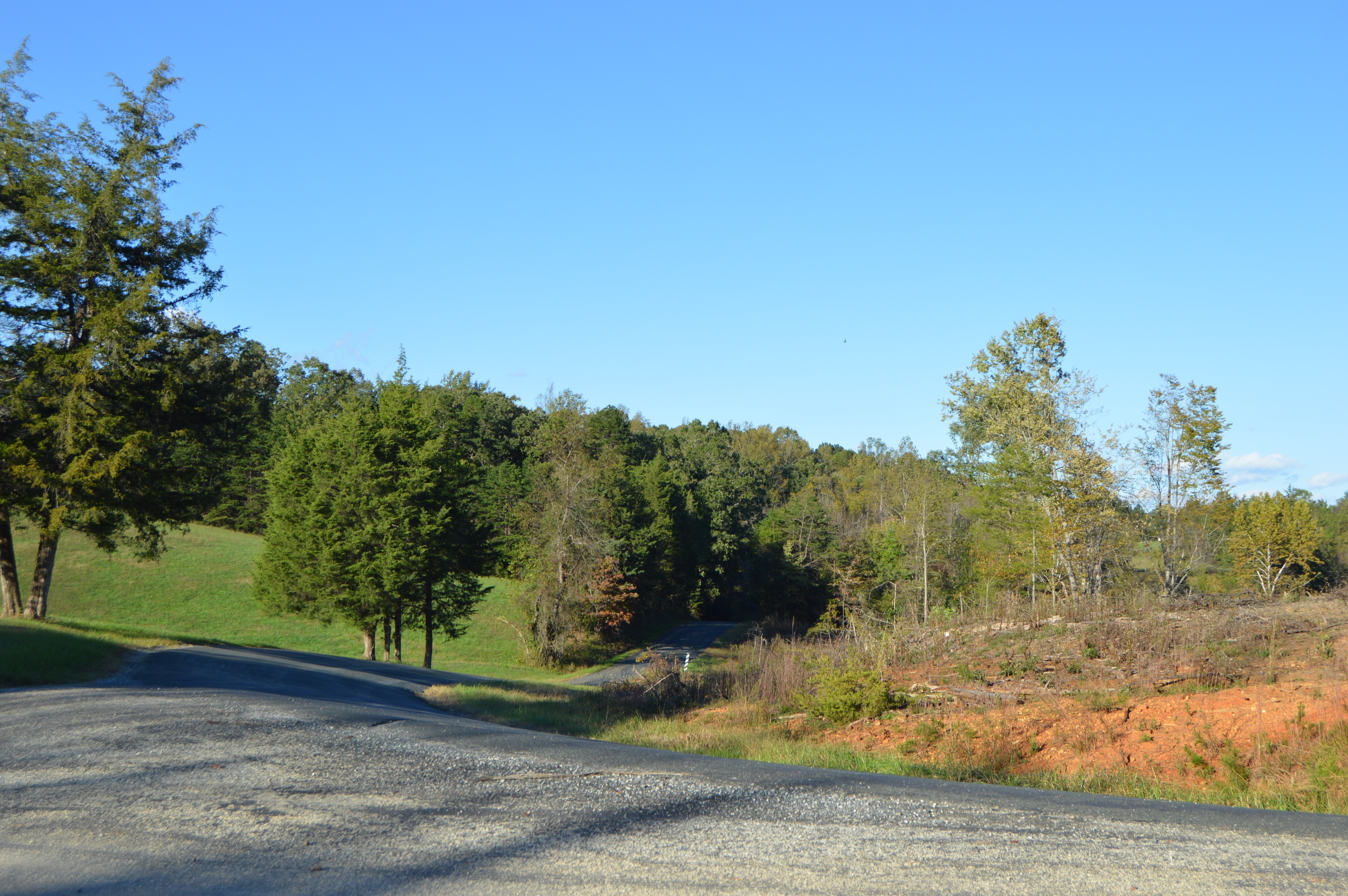
Overview of the site

Buffalo Springs is an unincorporated community in Nelson County, Virginia, United States.
