= Buffalo Springs, Mecklenburg County, Virginia =

Unincorporated community in Virginia, US

Coordinates: 36°38′46″N 78°39′42″W

Buffalo Springs (formerly, Buffalo Mineral Springs and Buffalo Lithia Springs) is an unincorporated community in Mecklenburg County, Virginia, United States. It lies at an elevation of 364 feet (111 m). Located at Buffalo Springs is the Buffalo Springs Historical Archeological District, listed on the National Register of Historic Places in 1998. The name, Buffalo Springs, specifically refers to a natural springs found in the area.

There was once a resort at the Springs, containing golf courses and even a bowling alley, but when water sales dropped the resort lost favor. Like many historically black communities, the property surrounding the springs was eventually purchased by the US Army Corps of Engineers as part of the John H. Kerr Reservoir. Trading paths throughout the area were once controlled by the Occaneechi, a historically black Native American tribe. To this day, descendants of the Occaneechi live near, and collect water from, this once thriving, unsegregated resort community.
