= Georgia State Route 10 =

State highway in central Georgia

State Route 10
- State Route 10 highlighted in red

Route information
- Maintained by GDOT
- Length: 172.3 mi (277.3 km)
- Existed: 1919–present

Major junctions
- West end: I-75 / I-85 in Downtown Atlanta
- US 29 / US 78 / US 278 / SR 8 in Atlanta; US 23 / US 29 / US 78 / SR 8 in Druid Hills; I-285 near Avondale Estates; US 78 / SR 410 north of Stone Mountain; US 29 / US 78 / US 78 Bus. / US 129 / US 441 / SR 10 Loop / SR 15 in Athens; US 78 Bus. / US 378 / SR 10 Bus. / SR 17 / SR 17 Bus. / SR 44 / SR 47 in Washington; I-520 / US 1 / US 25 / SR 4 / SR 121 in Augusta
- East end: US 1 / US 25 / US 78 / US 278 / SC 121 at the South Carolina state line in Augusta

Location
- Country: United States
- State: Georgia
- Counties: Fulton, DeKalb, Gwinnett, Walton, Oconee, Clarke, Oglethorpe, Wilkes, McDuffie, Columbia, Richmond

Highway system
- Georgia State Highway System; Interstate; US; State; Special
← SR 9E	→ US 11

State Route 10 (SR 10) is a 172.3-mile-long (277.3 km) state highway in the U.S. state of Georgia. It travels from Downtown Atlanta to the South Carolina state line in Augusta. This highway, along with U.S. Route 78 (US 78), connect three of the biggest metro areas of the state together: Atlanta, Athens, and Augusta. It travels concurrently with US 78 in three sections: from Atlanta to Druid Hills; from near Stone Mountain to near Athens; and from Athens to its eastern terminus, for a total of 149.2 miles (240.1 km), or approximately 86.6 percent of its route.

== Route description ==
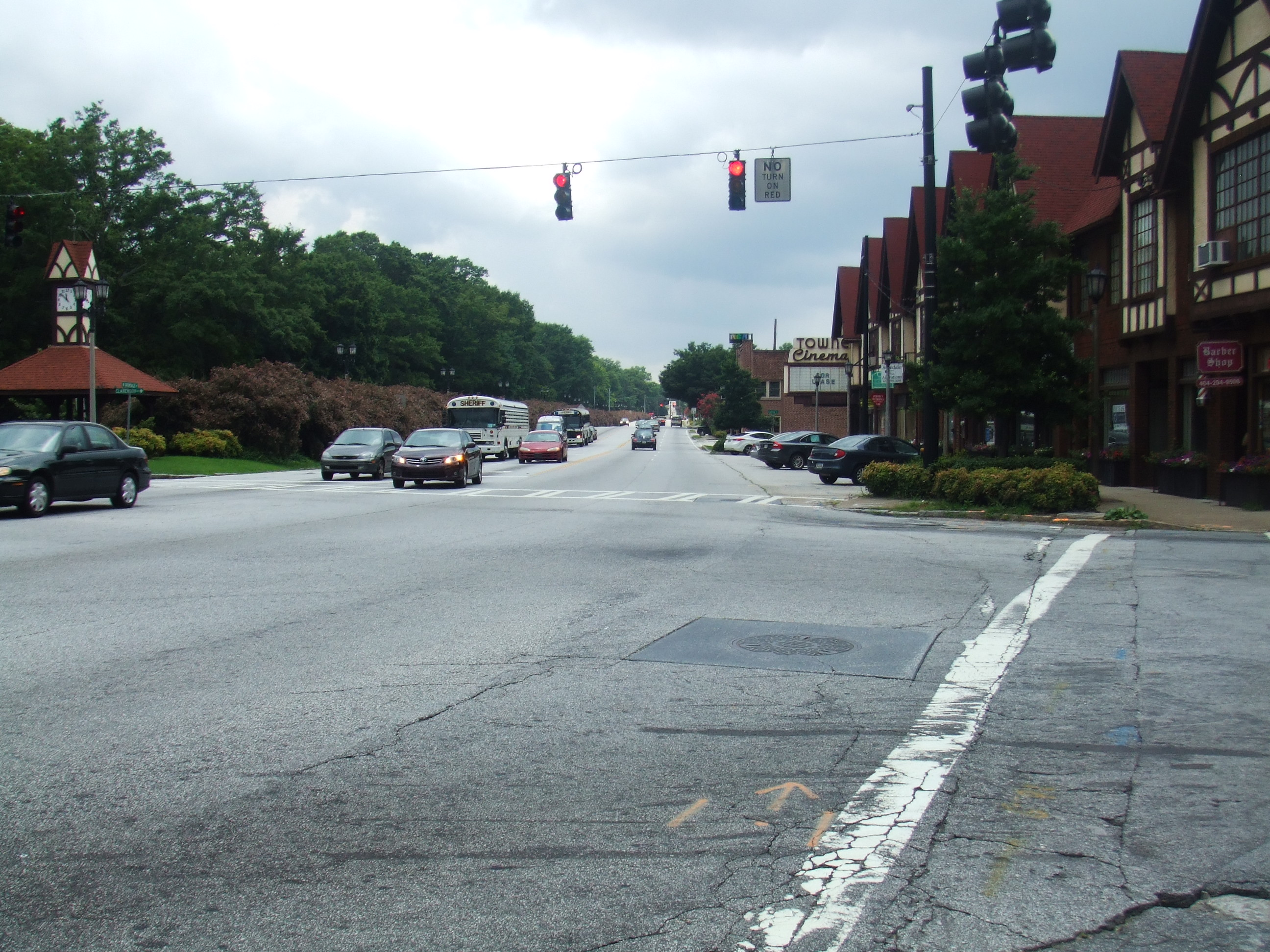
US 278/SR 10 in Avondale Estates

At its western end, SR 10 is the eastward extension of Andrew Young International Boulevard NE and Ellis Street NE and has an interchange with I-75/I-85 (Downtown Connector) on the eastern edge of Downtown Atlanta. It curves to the northeast and has an incomplete interchange with SR 42 Connector, which acts like an eastern spur of the Freedom Parkway. After that, SR 10 begins to curve to the north and passes to the west of the Jimmy Carter Library and Museum and the Carter Center; it curves to the north-northwest and has an intersection with US 29/US 78/US 278/SR 8 (Ponce de Leon Avenue NE).

The five highways travel concurrently to the east and meet US 23/SR 42. Here, US 23 joins the concurrency. The six highways travel together until they reach the southern edge of Deepdene Park, where US 278/SR 10 depart the concurrency to the southeast. US 278/SR 10 intersects SR 155 in Decatur. SR 155 joins the concurrency for about three blocks. At Mountain Drive, SR 10 departs from US 278 to the northeast. This intersection also marks the western end of SR 12. The short Mountain Drive segment of SR 10 passes north of the Kensington MARTA station. At the eastern end of Mountain Drive is an intersection with the eastern end of SR 154 (Memorial Drive). At this intersection, SR 10 turns onto Memorial Drive and has an interchange with I-285.

SR 10 skirts along the northwestern edge of Stone Mountain and has an interchange with East Ponce de Leon Avenue, just before meeting US 78/SR 410 (Stone Mountain Freeway). At this interchange, SR 410 ends and US 78/SR 10 travel concurrently. A short distance later, they have an interchange with the southern end of SR 236. The westbound and eastbound lanes diverge from each other. The eastbound lanes curve to the southeast and have an interchange with the main entrance of Stone Mountain Park.

In Mountain Park, they have an interchange with West Park Place Boulevard and Rockbridge Road; the latter is only listed on westbound signage. After this interchange, Stone Mountain Freeway ends and the numbered highways continue to the east-northeast. They intersect the northern end of SR 264 at the Cpl. Jonathan Ryan Ayers Memorial Interchange. The concurrency enters Snellville, where they intersect SR 124 (Scenic Highway) at the James D. Mason Memorial Interchange. Before exiting the city, they intersect SR 84.

In downtown Loganville, the concurrent highways intersect SR 20. They then intersect SR 81, which joins the concurrency. At Lee Byrd Road, SR 81 splits off to the south-southeast. US 78/SR 10 bypass the main part of Monroe on a freeway bypass. Their first exit is with SR 10 Business. Interchanges with SR 138 and SR 11 follow. Another interchange with the eastern end of SR 10 Business marks the end of the freeway bypass. US 78/SR 10 intersect SR 83 before leaving Monroe.

US 78/SR 10 continue to the northeast and intersect SR 53. They intersect Mars Hill Road, the former SR 209, just before an interchange with US 29/SR 8/SR 316, as well as the western end of US 78 Business. Here, SR 10 begins a concurrency with US 78 Business before entering Athens; while US 29/US 78/SR 8/SR 316 travel to the east-southeast.

US 78 Business/SR 10 travel to the southeast of Bogart and turn east along Atlanta Highway. They meet an interchange with SR 10 Loop (Athens Perimeter Highway). and pass Evergreen Memorial Park; then, they curve to the northeast. After passing north of Timothy Road Elementary School, they have an incomplete interchange with the northern terminus of Epps Bridge Parkway. After that, they cross over the Middle Oconee River. Here, Atlanta Highway ends and US 78 Business/SR 10 take on the West Broad Street name. They pass north of St. Mary's Hospital, Clarke Middle School, Classic City High School, and Clarke Central High School. At Milledge Avenue, they intersect SR 15 Alternate. Just over five blocks later, they skirt along the northern edge of the University of Georgia and curve to the southeast, crossing over the North Oconee River. Just over 3,000 feet (910 m) later, the concurrent highways meet US 29/US 78/US 129/US 441/SR 8/SR 10 Loop/SR 15, as well as the unsigned SR 422 (a total of eight highways). At this interchange, US 78 Business ends, and US 78/SR 10 travel to the southeast. They curve to the east-southeast and pass to the south of the Athens Ben Epps Airport. At the intersection of Cherokee Road, they pass southwest of Satterfield Park. They skirt along the northeastern edge of the Southeast Clarke Park before crossing over Shoal Creek. Just prior to crossing over Big Creek, the concurrency begins to curve to the south-southeast. They curve to the east-southeast and then to the southeast before leaving the city limits of Athens and entering Oglethorpe County.

US 78/SR 10 continue to the southeast, crossing over Moss Creek. After a brief east-northeast section, they travel just south of the city limits of Arnoldsville, in an east-southeast direction. Just before entering Crawford, they cross over Barrow Creek. In town, they curve to the east-northeast, travel to the north of Crawford Cemetery, and curve to the northeast. On the northeastern edge of the city limits, the concurrency begins a gradual curve to the southeast, traveling north of Brooks Lake and the Brooks Lake Dam and southwest of a branch of the Oglethrope County Library. They also pass Oglethorpe County High School. Immediately after entering Lexington, US 78/SR 10 intersect SR 22 (Comer Road), which joins the currency. The three highways travel to the south-southeast to an intersection with SR 77 (Union Point Road), which also joins the concurrency. The four-highway concurrency curves to the southeast and passes the city's magistrate court. Approximately 1,000 feet (300 m) before leaving the city limits, SR 77 departs the concurrency to the north-northeast on Elberton Road. The three highways begin a curve to the east-southeast, and SR 22 departs the concurrency to the south-southeast on Crawfordville Road. US 78/SR 10 cross over Long Creek, before curving to the south-southeast and then to the east-southeast. They cross over Buffalo Creek, curve back to the southeast, and make an easterly jaunt. Southeast of the University of Georgia Farm Lake, the highways cross over Dry Fork Creek into Wilkes County.

Just after US 78/SR 10 begin a gradual curve to the southeast, they cross over Beaverdam Creek. They travel south of Rock Cemetery. Just over 1,000 feet (300 m) after intersecting the southern terminus of Centerville Road and the northern terminus of Richardson Road, they begin to travel through Rayle. In the center of town, they curve to the east. Just to the east of town, the highways curve to the east-northeast and curve back to the east-southeast and travel to the south of Washington–Wilkes Orchard Lake and the Washington–Wilkes Orchard Dam. They again curve to the east-northeast and bend to the southeast, passing the Washington–Wilkes County Airport. A little over 1 mile (1.6 km) before entering the city limits of Washington, they intersect the western terminus of US 78 Business/SR 10 Business. In the city, just west of the intersection with the northern terminus of Campbell Street, the mainline routes begin to curve to the east-southeast. They intersect SR 44 (North Mercer Street), which joins the concurrency. The three highways travel with the honorary designation of the Benjamin Wynn Fortson Jr Memorial Highway, named for Benjamin W. Fortson, Jr., a former Secretary of State of Georgia. After crossing Threemile Creek and intersecting South Elijah Clark Drive, they curve to the east-northeast. At the intersection with Carey Street, they begin to curve back to the east-southeast. They intersect SR 17 Business (known locally as Poplar Drive to the south and Tignall Road to the north). Here, SR 44 departs the concurrency to the north. After this intersection, US 78/SR 10 begin to curve to the south-southeast. They curve to the east and intersect SR 17, where the concurrency turns right, and all three highways travel to the south-southeast. The concurrent routes skirt along the eastern city limits of Washington and travel to the west of Booth Lake and the Booth Lake Dam, before very briefly re-entering Washington proper. Just before the intersection with Ann Denard Drive, they begin to skirt the city limits again. On the southeastern edge of the city, they intersect the eastern terminus of US 78 Business/SR 10 Business and the southern terminus of SR 17 Business (all three carry the Robert Toombs Avenue name), as well as the western terminus of US 378 (Lincolnton Road). Both directions also carry SR 47. US 78/SR 10/SR 17 travel to the south-southeast, known as the Sam McGill Memorial Parkway. Almost immediately, they begin to curve to the east-southeast. They intersect the southern terminus of the unsigned SR 47 Connector (Thomson Road) and the eastern terminus of Denard Road. They curve to the south-southeast and travel through rural areas of the county and skirt along the northeastern edge of the Washington–Wilkes Country Club. On the southeastern corner of the golf course, the three highways intersect the northern terminus of SR 80 (Wrightsboro Road). They curve to the east-southeast and back to the southeast. They cross over the Little River into McDuffie County.

US 78/SR 10/SR 17 continue to the southeast and cross over Hart Creek and Big Creek. They curve to the south-southeast and intersect the southern terminus of SR 43 (Lincolnton Road). Approximately 500 feet (150 m) later, they pass Pine Grove Cemetery. Just after they intersect Stagecoach Road, they skirt along the eastern edge of Belle Meade Country Club and then the Thomson–McDuffie County Airport. Just before they enter Thomson, they intersect the northern terminus of SR 17 Bypass (Thomson Bypass). At this intersection, US 78/SR 10 turn left and follow the bypass around the eastern side of the city, while SR 17 continues toward the main part of the city. The three highways curve to the south-southeast and cross over, but do not have an interchange with, I-20 (Carl Sanders Highway). The trio travels through the northeastern part of Thomson and intersect SR 150 (Cobbham Road). They leave the unmarked city limits and curve to the east, before coming back to the south-southeast and intersect SR 223 (White Oak Road). The concurrency curves to the south-southwest and crosses over a CSX rail line before intersecting US 278/SR 12 (Augusta Road). At this intersection, SR 12 meets its eastern terminus, and US 78/US 278/SR 10 travel to the southeast as Augusta Highway. SR 17 Bypass travels to the south-southwest, as well. The three highways stairstep their way to the southeast, crossing over Sweetwater Creek and traveling near Boneville. Southwest of Boneville, they cross over Boneville Stream. South of Boneville, they travel southwest of Boneville Pond. Just before the intersection with Wire Road and Ellington Airline Road, they curve to the east-northeast. Just to the west of Old Augusta Road, US 78/US 278/SR 10 curve to the east-southeast. They curve to the southeast and enter Dearing. In town, they curve to the east and intersect School Drive, which leads to Augusta Technical College's Adult Education Center and Dearing Elementary School. The concurrency curves to the northeast and then back to the east-southeast, before they cross over Boggy Gut Creek and enter Columbia County.

Approximately 600 feet (180 m) after entering the county, US 78/US 278/SR 10 enter the western city limits of Harlem. Just to the southeast of West Boundary Street, they travel about two and a half blocks south of Harlem Middle School. In the main part of town, they intersect US 221/SR 47 (Louisville Street). At the southeastern edge of the city limits, the roadway becomes known as Gordon Highway, which is a major urban corridor farther to the east. The highways travel through Campania and Berzelia. A few thousand feet later, they curve to the northeast, entering Richmond County (and the city limits of Augusta), and begin paralleling the northern edge of Fort Gordon.

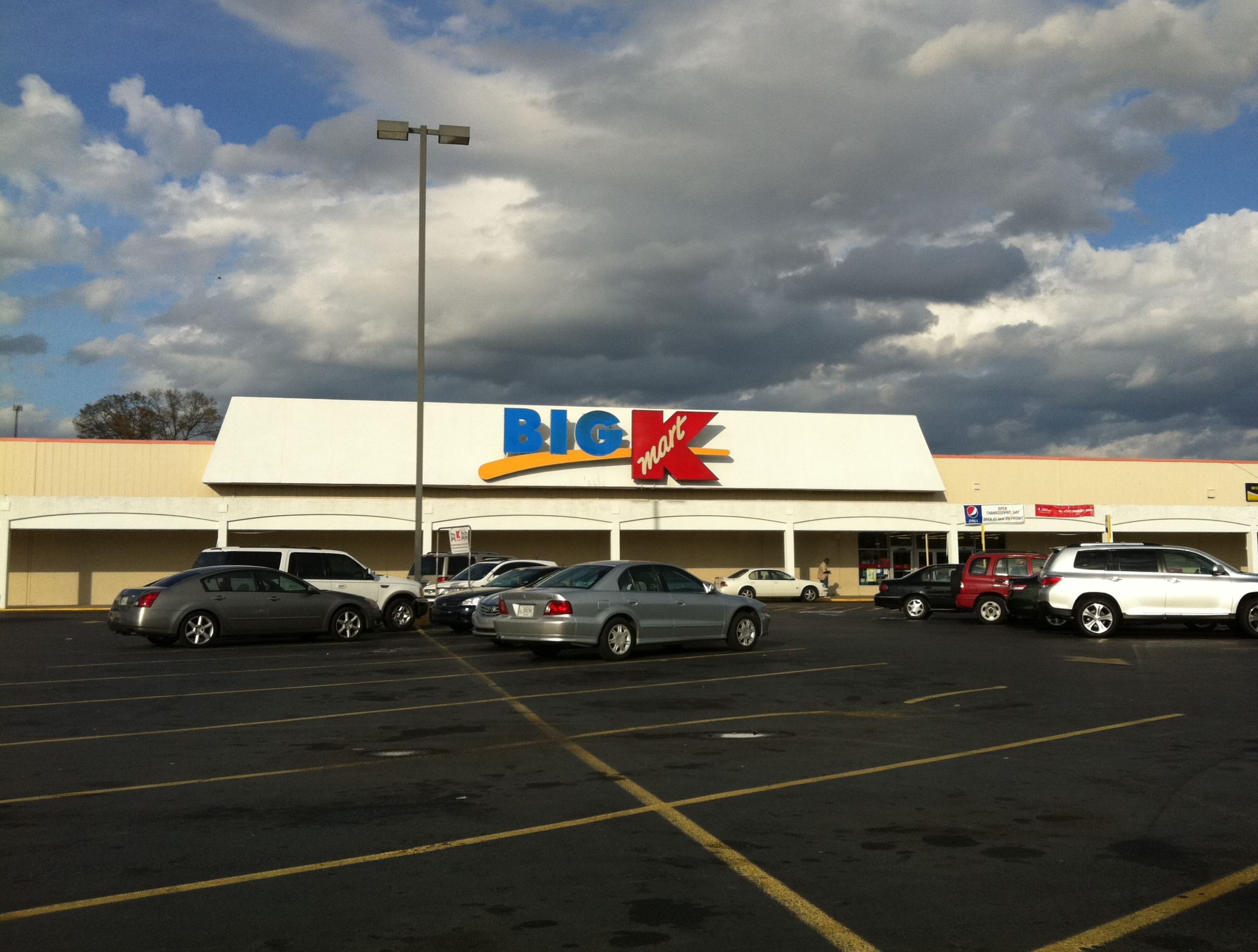
Former Kmart store on US 1/US 78/US 278/SR 10 (Gordon Highway)

US 78/US 278/SR 10 serve as the access point for Gordon Park Speedway and Augusta State Medical Prison. A short distance later is Fort Gordon's Gate 3, a commercial vehicle gate for the Army base and Gate 2, a variable-hour gate. At the intersection for Gate 2, the highway also intersects the eastern terminus of SR 223 (East Robinson Avenue). Approximately 3.4 miles (5.5 km) later is an intersection with the southern terminus of SR 383 (Jimmie Dyess Parkway) and the northern terminus of an access road to Fort Gordon's Gate 1, the 24-hour main gate for the base. About halfway between here and the interchange with I-520 (Bobby Jones Expressway), the three highways leave the edge of Fort Gordon and begin to transition into an urban corridor. After the interstate, the roadway enters the main part of Augusta, traveling south of Aquinas High School, and curves to the south-southeast, past the location of the now-closed Regency Mall. Immediately after a slight curve to the east is an intersection with US 1/SR 4 (Deans Bridge Road). US 1 joins the concurrency, while SR 4 continues to the northeast toward downtown. The four-highway concurrency curves slightly to the east-southeast to an interchange with US 25/SR 121 (Peach Orchard Road), which both join the concurrency. The six highways travel to the east-northeast and intersect the northern terminus of Doug Barnard Parkway (former SR 56 Spur) and the southern terminus of Molly Pond Road. The highways curve to the north-northeast and intersect Laney Walker Boulevard, thus effectively entering downtown. They travel just to the northwest of Magnolia Cemetery, Cedar Grove Cemetery, and May Park and southeast of James Brown Arena. A short distance later, they travel to the east of Old Medical College and the Old Government House, then they have an interchange with US 25 Business/SR 28 (Broad Street). Here, US 25 Bus. meets its southern terminus. Just after this interchange, the highways cross over the Savannah River into South Carolina. At the state line, SR 10 end, while US 1/US 25/US 78/US 278, concurrent with SC 121 curve to the northeast toward North Augusta.

=== National Highway System ===
The following portions of SR 10 are part of the National Highway System, a system of routes determined to be the most important for the nation's economy, mobility, and defense:

- From its western terminus to the northern terminus of the Thomson Bypass
- The entire portion within Richmond County

== History ==
=== 1920s ===
The roadway that would eventually be signed as SR 10 was established at least as far back as 1920 as part of SR 8 from downtown Atlanta to Decatur; SR 45 from Loganville to Monroe;; SR 8 from near Bogart to Athens; SR 10 from Athens to Washington; SR 17 from Washington to Thomson; and SR 12 from Thomson to Augusta. Also, SR 24 was established in Augusta, concurrent with SR 12. By the end of 1921, SR 45 was extended from Loganville west-southwest to Decatur and northeast from Monroe to the Bogart area. By the end of 1926, US 29 was designated along the portion of SR 8 between downtown Atlanta and Decatur; this portion was also paved. SR 45 between Decatur and Loganville was redesignated as part of US 78/SR 10, with the portion from Decatur to just north of Stone Mountain being paved. SR 45 between Loganville and Monroe was redesignated as part of SR 13 (and presumably US 78); SR 45 between Monroe and the Bogart area was redesignated as US 78/SR 10. US 29 (and presumably US 78/SR 10) were designated along the portion of SR 8 between the Bogart area and Athens; this portion was paved. US 78 was designated along SR 10 from Athens to Washington, SR 17 from Washington to Thomson, and SR 12 from Thomson to Augusta. A short segment of US 78/SR 10 was paved. A short segment of US 78/SR 10 northwest of Washington and a short segment of US 78/SR 17 southeast of Washington were paved. The entire concurrency of SR 12/SR 24 in Augusta was paved. Also, US 1 was designated along SR 24 and was made concurrent with US 78/SR 12 in Augusta. Prior to the beginning of 1932, the entire segment of SR 13 from Loganville to Monroe was paved. Nearly half of US 78/SR 10 between Athens and Lexington was paved. SR 10 was extended along US 78/SR 17 from Washington to Thomson and US 78/SR 12 from Thomson to Augusta. The entirety of US 78/SR 10/SR 12 (and US 1/SR 24) from Thomson to Augusta was paved.

=== 1930s to 1960s ===
In January 1932, SR 13 was redesignated as part of SR 20. Also, SR 24 was redesignated as SR 4. By May of the next year, all of US 78/SR 10 between Lexington and Washington was paved. In February 1934, all of US 78/SR 78/SR 10 between Athens and Lexington was paved. Near the end of the year, all of SR 20 between Loganville and Monroe was redesignated as part of SR 10 (and presumably US 78). By April 1937, all of US 78/SR 10 from downtown Atlanta to Snellville was paved. In August 1938, all of US 78/SR 10 from downtown Atlanta to the Walton–Oconee county line was paved. By July of the next year, the entire length of SR 10 at the time was paved. At the end of 1941, SR 42A was designated along Ponce de Leon Avenue in Atlanta. By the end of 1946, it was decommissioned. By the middle of 1960, US 278 was designated along US 78/SR 10 from downtown Atlanta to Decatur, and along US 78/SR 10/SR 12 from Harlem (or possibly Thomson) to Augusta. By 1966, I-485 was proposed from I-75/I-85 (Downtown Connector) to Boulevard. In Athens, US 29/US 78/SR 8/SR 10 traveled into the main part of town, with US 29 splitting off onto US 129/US 441 Temporary/SR 15 (Milledge Avenue; now SR 15 Alternate). SR 8 departed the concurrency on Pulaski Street. SR 15 Alternate traveled concurrent with US 78/SR 10 from South Hull Street to Thomas Street. Later that year, the I-485 proposal was extended east and north to end at I-85, along with an early proposed route for SR 410, with SR 400 being proposed to be routed both north and south of this extension. In Athens, US 29/SR 8 were designated along the northern part of the Athens Perimeter Highway, with US 78/SR 8 Bus./SR 10 traveling through the city. In the Monroe area, US 78/SR 10 were rerouted north of the main part of town. The former route became SR 10 Business. The next year, the north–south portion of the proposed I-485 no longer had SR 410 as a hidden concurrent route; SR 400's proposed routing was extended along this entire proposal. SR 410 was proposed to travel from the eastern end of the east–west segment of I-485 to where US 29/SR 8 split from US 78/US 278/SR 10 in Druid Hills. Also, it was proposed along its current routing. In 1969, a northern bypass of Washington was built, designated as SR 10 Bypass, while US 78/SR 10 continued to travel through the main part of town.

=== 1970s to 1990s ===
In 1970, US 78/SR 10 were routed along SR 10 Loop in the northern part of Washington, with the former routing becoming US 78 Bus. (and presumably SR 10 Bus.). By 1975, the I-485 proposal was removed from SR 410 and SR 400. In 1976, the proposal for SR 400 south of I-85 and the western segment for SR 410 were dropped, with only a short freeway from I-75/I-85 to Boulevard left on the books. On the 1980-1981 GDOT map, it was revealed that this short freeway was designated as a western segment of SR 410. In 1980, SR 12 was truncated to end in Thomson, no longer concurrent with US 78/US 278/SR 10 from there to Augusta. In 1986, SR 10 Loop was decommissioned. In 1988, US 78 was routed along the Athens Perimeter Highway, but entering from the Atlanta Highway exit; the roadway inside the Perimeter was redesignated as US 78 Business, with SR 10 still designated along this stretch of highway. In 1991, SR 410's western segment was redesignated as part of SR 10, with a proposal to extend the freeway northeast to US 23/SR 42. In 1993, SR 10's eastward extension in Atlanta was completed to Ponce de Leon Avenue. Between 1994 and 1996, the portion of US 78 between the Bogart area and the northwest of Athens was redesignated as a westward extension of US 78 Business, with SR 10 still along this segment.

=== Miscellaneous notes ===
The Freedom Parkway portion of SR 10 uses the right-of-way of a canceled inner-city Interstate highway project, I-485, which would have traveled eastward (and in a later routing, northward) from downtown Atlanta to an interchange with I-85. The original I-485 interchange with I-75/I-85 in downtown Atlanta is now used for access to Freedom Parkway, though the reduced number of lanes (compared to what was originally planned) makes the interchange look somewhat oversized for its current purpose. The eastern portion of I-485 was completed as the Stone Mountain Freeway, which also carries SR 10 (and also US 78/SR 410) out to the Stone Mountain.

The land that Freedom Parkway uses around the Carter Center, as well as the land the Carter Center sits on, was originally slated to be used for the I-485 interchange with I-475 (now known as SR 400 further north and I-675 further south), had those roadways been completed through the city of Atlanta proper. Community opposition ended plans for roadway construction in the 1970s when Jimmy Carter was governor of Georgia, but only after hundreds of homes has already been taken by eminent domain and demolished.

== Major intersections ==
County	Location	mi	km	Exit	Destinations	Notes
Fulton	Atlanta	0.0	0.0		I-75 / I-85 (Downtown Connector / SR 295 / SR 401 / SR 403) – Macon, Montgomery, Chattanooga, Greenville	Western terminus; roadway continues as Andrew Young International Boulevard and Ellis Street; I-75/I-85 exit 248C.
Fulton	Atlanta	1.0	1.6		SR 42 Conn. north (Freedom Parkway) – Jimmy Carter Presidential Library, Carter Center	Southern terminus of SR 42 Conn.
Fulton	Atlanta	1.8	2.9		US 29 south / US 78 west / US 278 west / SR 8 west (Ponce de Leon Avenue N.E.)	Western end of US 29/US 78/SR 8 and US 278 concurrencies
Fulton–DeKalb county line	Atlanta	2.4	3.9		US 23 south (Moreland Avenue N.E.) / SR 42 (Briarcliff Road N.E.)	Western end of US 23 concurrency
DeKalb	Druid Hills	4.1	6.6		US 23 north / US 29 north / US 78 east / SR 8 east (Ponce de Leon Avenue N.E.)	Eastern end of US 23 and US 29/US 78/SR 8 concurrency
DeKalb	Decatur	6.4	10.3		SR 155 south (South Candler Street) / East Trinity Place north	Western end of SR 155 concurrency; southern terminus of East Trinity Place
DeKalb	Decatur	6.7	10.8		SR 155 north (Commerce Drive)	Eastern end of SR 155 concurrency
DeKalb	Avondale Estates	8.6	13.8		US 278 east / SR 12 east (Covington Highway) – Lithonia	Eastern end of US 278 concurrency; western terminus of SR 12
DeKalb		9.2	14.8		SR 154 west (Memorial Drive) – Atlanta	Eastern terminus of SR 154
DeKalb		9.5	15.3		I-285 (Atlanta Bypass / SR 407)	I-285 exit 41; Tom Scott Interchange
DeKalb		14.4	23.2		East Ponce de Leon Avenue – Stone Mountain Village, Clarkston	Interchange
DeKalb		15.2	24.5	5	US 78 west / SR 410 west (Stone Mountain Freeway) – Decatur, Atlanta	Western end of US 78 concurrency; eastern terminus of SR 410; concurrency uses US 78 exit numbers; SR 10 follows exit 5.
DeKalb	Stone Mountain Park	16.1	25.9	7	Hugh Howell Road – Tucker	Former eastern terminus of SR 236 since 2024
DeKalb	Stone Mountain Park	16.9	27.2	8	Stone Mountain Park main entrance	
DeKalb	Stone Mountain Park	17.4	28.0	9	West Park Place Boulevard / Rockbridge Road	Eastern terminus of Stone Mountain Freeway
Gwinnett		21.0	33.8		SR 264 south (Bethany Church Road) / Killian Hill Road S.W. north – Centerville	Northern terminus of SR 264; southern terminus of Killian Hill Road S.W.; Cpl Jonathan Ryan Ayers Interchange
Gwinnett	Snellville	24.2	38.9		SR 124 (Scenic Highway) – Lithonia, Lawrenceville	James D. Mason Memorial Intersection
Gwinnett	Snellville	25.7	41.4		SR 84 north (Grayson Parkway) / Rockdale Circle south	Southern terminus of SR 84; northern terminus of Rockdale Circle
Walton	Loganville	31.6	50.9		SR 20 – Lawrenceville, Conyers	
Walton	Loganville	32.4	52.1		SR 81 north (Lawrenceville Road) / Cown Drive south – Winder	Western end of SR 81 concurrency; northern terminus of Cown Drive
Walton	Loganville	32.7	52.6		SR 81 south – Covington	Eastern end of SR 81 concurrency
Walton		40.9	65.8		SR 10 Bus. east (West Spring Street)	Interchange; eastern exit and western entrance; western terminus of SR 10 Bus.
Walton	Monroe	41.6	66.9		SR 138 south (Martin Luther King Jr. Boulevard) – Conyers	Interchange; northern terminus of SR 138
Walton	Monroe	42.4	68.2		SR 11 (North Broad Street) – Winder	Interchange
Walton	Monroe	44.4	71.5		SR 10 Bus. west (East Spring Street)	Interchange; western exit and eastern entrance; eastern terminus of SR 10 Bus.
Walton	Monroe	45.3	72.9		SR 83 south (Unisia Drive) – Madison	Northern terminus of SR 83
Oconee		53.9	86.7		SR 53 (Hog Mountain Road) – Watkinsville, Winder	
Oconee		58.0	93.3		US 29 / US 78 east / SR 8 / SR 316 (University Parkway) / US 78 Bus. begins	Eastern end of US 78 concurrency; western end of US 78 Bus. concurrency; interchange
Clarke	Athens	61.6	99.1		SR 10 Loop (Athens Perimeter Highway / SR 422) – Hartwell, Elberton, Watkinsville, Univ. of Georgia, State Botanical Garden, UGA Center for Continuing Education Conference Center & Hotel, UGA Stadium	Interchange; SR 10 Loop exit 18
Clarke	Athens	63.3	101.9		Epps Bridge Parkway south to SR 316 west – Atlanta	Interchange; northern terminus of Epps Bridge Parkway; former SR 900
Clarke	Athens				Officer Buddy Christian Memorial Bridge	Crossing over Middle Oconee River
Clarke	Athens	66.1	106.4		SR 15 Alt. (Milledge Avenue) – Greensboro, Gainesville	
Clarke	Athens	68.2	109.8		US 29 / US 78 west / US 129 / US 441 / SR 8 / SR 10 Loop / SR 15 (Athens Perimeter Highway / SR 422) / US 78 Bus. ends – Watkinsville, Monroe, Winder, Commerce, Jefferson, Hartwell, Lexington, Washington	Eastern end of US 78 Bus. concurrency; western end of US 78 concurrency; eastern terminus of US 78 Bus.; interchange
Oglethorpe	Lexington	84.0	135.2		SR 22 east (Comer Road) – Watson Mill Bridge State Park	Western end of SR 22 concurrency
Oglethorpe	Lexington	84.3	135.7		SR 77 south (Union Point Road) – Union Point, Siloam	Western end of SR 77 concurrency
Oglethorpe	Lexington	84.9	136.6		SR 77 north – Elberton, Hartwell	Eastern end of SR 77 concurrency
Oglethorpe		86.0	138.4		SR 22 west (Crawfordville Road) – Crawfordville	Eastern end of SR 22 concurrency
Wilkes		106.7	171.7		US 78 Bus. east / SR 10 Bus. east – Washington	Western terminus of US 78 Bus./SR 10 Bus.
Wilkes	Washington	108.9	175.3		SR 44 south (North Mercer Street) – Greensboro	Western end of SR 44 concurrency
Wilkes	Washington	109.7	176.5		SR 17 Bus. (Poplar Drive) / SR 44 north (Tignall Drive) – Tignall	Eastern end of SR 44 concurrency
Wilkes	Washington	110.3	177.5		SR 17 north – Elberton	Western end of SR 17 concurrency
Wilkes	Washington	112.1	180.4		US 78 Bus. west / SR 10 Bus. west / SR 17 Bus. north (Robert Toombs Avenue) / US 378 east / SR 47 (Lincolnton Road) – Crawfordville, Lincolnton	Eastern terminus of US 78 Bus./SR 10 Bus.; southern terminus of SR 17 Bus.; western terminus of US 378
Wilkes		112.4	180.9		SR 47 Conn. north (Thomson Road)	Southern terminus of SR 47 Conn.; northern terminus of Denard Road
Wilkes		114.6	184.4		SR 80 south (Wrightsboro Road) to I-20 – Warrenton	Northern terminus of SR 80
McDuffie		130.1	209.4		SR 43 north (Lincolnton Road) – Lincolnton	Southern terminus of SR 43
McDuffie		132.0	212.4		SR 17 south (Washington Road) / SR 17 Byp. begins to I-20 / Knox Rivers Road west – Thomson Business District	Eastern end of SR 17 concurrency; northern terminus of SR 17 Byp.; west end of SR 17 Byp. concurrency; eastern terminus of Knox Rivers Road
McDuffie	Thomson	134.8	216.9		SR 150 (Cobbham Road) – Clarks Hill, SC	
McDuffie		136.2	219.2		SR 223 (White Oak Road) – Appling, Grovetown	
McDuffie		137.6	221.4		US 278 west / SR 12 west (Augusta Road) / SR 17 Byp. south (Thomson Bypass) – Thomson, Harlem	Eastern end of SR 17 Byp. concurrency; western end of US 278 concurrency; eastern terminus of SR 12
Columbia	Harlem	148.7	239.3		US 221 / SR 47 (Louisville Street) – Wrens, Appling	
Richmond	Augusta	157.5	253.5		SR 223 (East Robinson Avenue) – Grovetown, Fort Gordon's Gate 2	Eastern terminus of SR 223
Richmond	Augusta	160.9	258.9		SR 383 north (Jimmie Dyess Parkway) to I-20 – Fort Gordon's Gate 1	Southern terminus of SR 383
Richmond	Augusta	163.4	263.0		I-520 (Bobby Jones Expressway / SR 415) to I-20 – Columbia, Atlanta, Bush Field	I-520 exit 3
Richmond	Augusta	167.0	268.8		US 1 south / SR 4 (Deans Bridge Road) – Wrens, Louisville	Western end of US 1 concurrency
Richmond	Augusta	168.2	270.7		US 25 south / SR 121 south (Peach Orchard Road) – Waynesboro	Interchange; western end of US 25/SR 121 concurrency
Richmond	Augusta	169.5	272.8		Molly Pond Road north / Doug Barnard Parkway south – Augusta Regional Airport, Phinizy Swamp Nature Park	Southern terminus of Molly Pond Road; northern terminus of Doug Barnard Parkway; former SR 56 Spur south
Richmond	Augusta	172.1	277.0		US 25 Bus. north / SR 28 (Broad Street) – Downtown	Interchange; southern terminus of US 25 Bus.; also serves Bay Street; eastbound lanes have access via Bay Street.
South Carolina state line		172.3	277.3	Eastern end of US 1, US 25/SR 121, US 78, and US 278 concurrencies; eastern terminus at a crossing of the Savannah River; SR 121 continues as SC 121 at the state line		
Aiken					US 1 north / US 25 north / US 78 east / US 278 east / SC 121 north (Jefferson Davis Highway) – Aiken, Edgefield	Continuation of roadway into South Carolina
1.000 mi = 1.609 km; 1.000 km = 0.621 mi: Concurrency terminus; Incomplete access

== Special routes ==
=== Monroe bypass route ===
State Route 10 Bypass
- Location: Monroe
- Existed: 1966–1988

State Route 10 Bypass (SR 10 Byp.) was a bypass route for SR 10 that partially existed in the city limits of Monroe. Between 1949 and 1961, a bypass of the main part of Monroe, designated SR 10 Byp., was proposed between two interchanges with US 78/SR 10 (one west of the city and the other in the northeastern part of the city. In 1966, US 78's path through the city was shifted onto this proposed path, with SR 10 Byp. designated on it. In 1985, the path of SR 10 in the city was redesignated as SR 10 Bus., which cut SR 10 into two parts. In 1988, SR 10 Byp. was redesignated as part of SR 10.

The entire route was in Walton County.

Location	mi	km	Destinations	Notes
			US 78 west / SR 10 west / SR 10 Bus. east	Western terminus of SR 10 Byp. and SR 10 Bus.; no access from US 78/SR 10 Byp. west to SR 10 Bus. or vice versa
Monroe			SR 138	Interchange
Monroe			SR 11	Interchange
Monroe			US 78 east / SR 10 east / SR 10 Bus. west	Eastern terminus of SR 10 Byp. and SR 10 Bus.; no access from US 78/SR 10 Byp. east to SR 10 Bus. or vice versa
1.000 mi = 1.609 km; 1.000 km = 0.621 mi: Incomplete access

=== Monroe business loop ===
Spring Street
- Location: Monroe
- Length: 4.0 mi (6.4 km)
- Existed: 1966–present

State Route 10 Business (SR 10 Bus.) is a 4.0-mile-long (6.4 km) business route of SR 10 that exists almost entirely within the central city limits of Monroe, in Walton County. It is known as Spring Street for its entire length.

It begins just northwest of the main part of Monroe, at an incomplete interchange with US 78/SR 10. The highway travels southeast and has an intersection with SR 138 (Martin Luther King Jr Boulevard). It curves to the east-northeast and crosses over Mountain Creek. In the main part of town, it intersects SR 11 (Broad Street). The business route passes south of Rest Haven Cemetery and curves to the northeast to meet its eastern terminus, another incomplete interchange with US 78/SR 10.

SR 10 Bus. is not part of the National Highway System, a system of roadways important to the nation's economy, defense, and mobility.

SR 10 Bus. was designated in 1966 when US 78/SR 10 were rerouted north of the main part of town. The former route became the Business route.

The entire route is in Walton County.

Location	mi	km	Destinations	Notes
	0.0	0.0	US 78 west / SR 10 west	Western terminus; no access from SR 10 Bus. to US 78/SR 10 east or from US 78/SR 10 west to SR 10 Bus.
Monroe	0.8	1.3	SR 138 (Martin Luther King Jr Boulevard) – Walnut Grove	
Monroe	2.6	4.2	SR 11 (Broad Street) – Social Circle	No turn allowed from SR 10 Bus. to SR 11 north
Monroe	4.0	6.4	US 78 east / SR 10 east	Eastern terminus; no access from SR 10 Bus. to US 78/SR 10 west or from US 78/SR 10 east to SR 10 Bus.
1.000 mi = 1.609 km; 1.000 km = 0.621 mi: Incomplete access

=== Athens loop ===
State Route 10 Loop
- Location: Athens
- Length: 19.1 mi (30.7 km)

State Route 10 Loop (SR 10 Loop, also known as Loop 10, Paul Broun Parkway, or the Athens Perimeter Highway) is a 19.1-mile-long (30.7 km) state highway in the form of a beltway around Athens in the U.S. state of Georgia. After a partial at-grade intersection within the inner lanes is upgraded to a partial-cloverleaf intersection, the entire route will be built to freeway standards. Much of the road is concurrent with other routes (such as U.S. Route 29 (US 29), US 78, US 129, US 441, SR 8, and SR 15) that travel through the Athens area. It also carries the unsigned SR 422 designation. Only US 78 Bus./SR 10 and SR 15 Alt. travel through downtown Athens. Inner/outer directions are often used to sign the loop.

=== Washington business loop ===
State Route 10 Business
- Location: Washington
- Length: 4.6 mi (7.4 km)
- Existed: 1970–present

State Route 10 Business (SR 10 Bus.) is a 4.6-mile-long (7.4 km) business route of SR 10 that exists almost entirely within the central city limits of Washington, in Wilkes County. It is known as Lexington Avenue and Robert Toombs Avenue. It is concurrent with US 78 Bus. for its entire length.

=== Washington loop ===
State Route 10 Loop
- Location: Washington
- Existed: 1970–1986

State Route 10 Loop (SR 10 Loop) was a loop route of SR 10 that existed almost entirely within the central city limits of Washington, in Wilkes County. It was concurrent with US 78 (and presumably SR 10) for its entire length.

In 1970, US 78/SR 10 were rerouted from the central part of town along SR 10 Loop in the northern part of Washington, with the former routing becoming US 78 Bus. (and presumably SR 10 Bus.). Between 1984 and 1986, SR 10 Loop was decommissioned.

== See also ==
- Transportation in Atlanta
- Transportation in Augusta, Georgia
