= U.S. Route 78 in Georgia =

Highway in Georgia, United States

U.S. Highway 78
- US 78 highlighted in red

Route information
- Maintained by GDOT
- Length: 233.56 mi (375.88 km)
- Existed: 1926–present

Major junctions
- West end: US 78 / SR 4 / SR 8 at the Alabama state line west of Tallapoosa
- US 27 / SR 1 in Bremen; I-285 in Atlanta; US 19 / US 29 / US 41 / SR 3 in Atlanta; I-285 on the Scottdale–Clarkston line; US 29 / US 78 Bus. / SR 8 / SR 10 / SR 316 southeast of Bogart; US 29 / US 129 / US 441 / SR 10 Loop / SR 15 in Athens; I-520 / US 1 / US 25 / SR 4 / SR 121 in Augusta
- East end: US 1 / US 25 / US 78 / US 278 / SC 121 / SR 10 at the South Carolina state line in Augusta

Location
- Country: United States
- State: Georgia
- Counties: Haralson, Carroll, Douglas, Cobb, Fulton, DeKalb, Gwinnett, Walton, Oconee, Clarke, Oglethorpe, Wilkes, McDuffie, Columbia, Richmond

Highway system
- United States Numbered Highway System; List; Special; Divided; Georgia State Highway System; Interstate; US; State; Special
← SR 77	→ SR 78

U.S. Route 78 (US 78) is a 233.56-mile-long (375.88 km) U.S. Highway in the U.S. state of Georgia. It travels west to east in the north-central part of the state, starting at the Alabama state line, west of Tallapoosa, where the roadway continues concurrent with the unsigned highway Alabama State Route 4. This is also the western terminus of Georgia State Route 8 (SR 8), which is concurrent with US 78 to the east. The highway serves the Atlanta, Athens, and Augusta metropolitan areas on its path from the Alabama state line to the South Carolina state line, at the Savannah River, on the northeastern edge of Augusta, where it continues concurrent with US 1/US 25/US 278/SC 121. This is also the eastern terminus of SR 10. US 78 travels through portions of Haralson, Carroll, Douglas, Cobb, Fulton, DeKalb, Gwinnett, Walton, Oconee, Clarke, Oglethorpe, Wilkes, McDuffie, Columbia, and Richmond counties.

Various portions of the highway, from the Alabama state line into Atlanta, were part of the historic Bankhead Highway, a cross-country automobile highway connecting San Diego and Washington, D.C. It was part of the National Auto Trail system.

US 78 also is a freeway for about 10 miles. It is the main route of the freeway. It has about 8 exits.

== Route description ==
=== Alabama to Mableton ===
US 78 begins at the Alabama state line, west of Tallapoosa, where the roadway continues to the northwest, concurrent with the unsigned Alabama State Route 4 (SR 4). Southeast of here in Haralson County, US 78 travels concurrent with Georgia State Route 8 (SR 8), which also begins at the state line. They travel just to the south of Wards Lakes, East Wards Lake, and the East Wards Lake Dam, and cross over Sanders Creek. Approximately 1 mile (1.6 km) southeast of the creek, US 78/SR 8 cross over the Tallapoosa River on the Bently Bridge. About 500 feet (150 m) later, they curve to the east-northeast. Then, they enter Tallapoosa's city limits, where they have a very gradual curve to the east. In the main part of town, they have an intersection with SR 100 (Robertson Avenue), which joins the concurrency for a few blocks, until it turns off onto Alewine Avenue. Here, the concurrency curves to the east-southeast. Just before leaving town, US 78/SR 8 intersect the northern terminus of SR 100 Spur before crossing over Greene Creek. Immediately, upon leaving the city limits, they pass the Helton Howland Park and the Tally Valley Park. Upon passing Pine Grove Cemetery, they are northeast of Tally Mountain; then, they curve to the southeast, passing through Budapest. After crossing over a Norfolk Southern Railway (NS) line, the two highways curve to the east-southeast and enter Waco. In the main part of town, they curve to the east-northeast and leave the city limits. Immediately, they enter Bremen. Just after the city limits, they pass just south of Antioch Cemetery and intersect US 27/SR 1 (Martha Berry Highway). A few blocks later, they pass northwest of Bremen City Cemetery and Higgins General Hospital. In the main part of the city, they cross over an NS line and intersect US 27 Business/SR 1 Business (locally known as Alabama Avenue to the south and Hamilton Avenue to the north). Just before intersecting Bryan Street, the highways begin to curve to the east-southeast. They cross over Buck Creek, and begin a very gradual curve to the east-northeast, shortly before leaving the city limits. North of the Mangham Lakes, US 78/SR 8 begin to curve to a nearly northeast routing. Just after crossing over Chance Creek, they curve to the east-southeast and enter Carroll County and the city limits of Temple.

In Temple, US 78/SR 8 pass just south of Easterwood Lake before they cross over Webster Creek. Slightly more than 1,000 feet (300 m) later is an intersection with the western terminus of SR 274 (James Street) and the northern terminus of Centerpoint Road. Right after this, the two highways slightly shift to a nearly due-east routing. Almost 2,000 feet (610 m) after SR 274 is an intersection with SR 113 (Carrollton Street). About a block and a half later, the two highways pass just south of Temple High School. Immediately after the school is the eastern terminus of SR 274 (Sage Street), which circles around the SR 113 intersection. Just to the east of Oak Shade Road, the concurrency curves to the northeast. They begin a gradual curve back to the east-southeast, cross over Trestle Creek and leave the city limits. After a slight jog to the north, they curve to the southeast and cross over the Little Tallapoosa River. Approximately 400 feet (120 m) later, they curve to the east-southeast and then enter Villa Rica. In the main part of the city, US 78/SR 8 curve to the east-northeast and intersect SR 101 (locally known as Industrial Boulevard to the south) and SR 61, the latter of which joins the concurrency. The three highways pass Hill Crest Cemetery before a fairly sharp curve to the southeast. At Carroll Road, SR 61 departs the concurrency to the northeast. The highways curve to the east-northeast and enter Douglas County.

US 78/SR 8 curve back to the east-southeast and very briefly travel due east. During this section, they intersect the northern terminus of SR 8 Connector (Liberty Road). Almost immediately, they curve to the east-northeast before curving back to the east-southeast and leaving the city limits. After a brief northeast routing, they curve to a nearly due-east direction and back to the east-southeast, north of Andy Mountain. They head southeast and curve back to the east-northeast, traveling through Winston, and passing Winston Elementary School. US 78/SR 8 travel due east to an intersection with the southern terminus of Polk Road, where they begin to curve to the east-northeast. They travel through White City, curving back to the northeast. After a very brief jaunt to the east, the concurrency curves to the east-northeast and enters Douglasville. In town, they intersect SR 5 (Bill Arp Road), which joins the concurrency. In downtown, they travel just south of Worthan Park a few blocks before intersecting SR 92, which also joins the concurrency. The four highways travel together for two blocks, where SR 92 splits off onto Mozley Street. US 78/SR 5/SR 8 leave the city limits and pass northwest of Beulah Elementary School. They pass Sunrise Memorial Gardens and curve to the east-northeast just before entering Lithia Springs. In town, they travel north of Penns Lake and curve to the east. They curve to the northeast and back to the southeast, before curving back to the northeast and intersecting US 278/SR 6 (Thornton Road). At this intersection, US 278 joins the concurrency, which travels to the north-northeast. They pass Louise Suggs Memorial Park and intersect Line Street, where they enter Cobb County and the city limits of Austell.

US 78/US 278/SR 5/SR 8 travel one block to the east of Rose Hill Cemetery. Just north of Rosehill Street, they make a slight tilt to the north-northwest before a nearly 90-degree curve to the right, then traveling to the east-northeast. The four highways travel just south of Collar Park. They cross over Sweetwater Creek on the Dr. J.A. Griffith Bridge. Just over 1,500 feet (460 m) later, SR 5 departs the concurrency to the north. The other three highways cross over Butternut Creek and enter Mableton. They travel in a roughly eastern direction before curving to the east-southeast and passing the Austell Campus of Chattahoochee Technical College and Davis Chapel Cemetery. They curve to the northeast, and pass northwest of Sky View Elementary School, before beginning to curve back to the southeast. At this point, they are south of Mableton Elementary School and Mableton Memorial Gardens. After an intersection with the western terminus of SR 139 and the southern terminus of Floyd Road, they travel just south of Lions Park. After a curve to the east, they pass Harmony–Leland Elementary School and Lindley Middle School. They curve to the southeast, passing Mt. Harmony Cemetery and Cobblestone Creek Pond, before crossing over Nickajack Creek on the Coogan Ray Bleodow Memorial Bridge, where they leave the city limits. The three highway continue to the southeast and cross over the Chattahoochee River into Fulton County and the city limits of Atlanta.

=== Atlanta area ===
From nearly the very moment that US 78/US 278/SR 8 enter the county, they are southwest of the Atlanta Industrial Park. The travel through the former location of the Bankhead Courts, a government housing complex. On the southeast corner of the industrial park is English Park and an intersection with the northern terminus of SR 70 (Fulton Industrial Boulevard NW). Less than 1,000 feet (300 m) later is an interchange with Interstate 285 (I-285; Atlanta Bypass). The concurrency travels through the Brookview Heights neighborhood, southwest of Carey Park and Williams Elementary School. A short distance later, they intersect SR 280 (locally known as Hamilton E. Holmes Drive to the south and James Jackson Parkway NW to the north). After curving to an eastern routing, the three highways pass Center Hill Park. At an intersection with the southern terminus of Hollywood Road NW, the concurrency curves to the southeast. They travel through Grove Park, passing Edwin Place Park, Grove Park Elementary School, and Woodson Elementary School. They curve to an easterly routing and cross over Proctor Creek. US 78/US 278/SR 8 travel through Bankhead, passing Maddox Park, just south of the Fulton County Jail. The three highways intersect US 19/US 41/SR 3 (Northside Drive NW) at an intersection that doesn't have any signage on the eastbound lanes. All six highways travel concurrently to the southeast for about 0.3 miles (0.48 km). Along this stretch, drivers can see the Atlanta skyline. US 19/US 41/SR 3, along with US 29 southbound, travel in a due-south direction. At the same time, US 78/US 278/SR 8, along with US 29 northbound, travel to the east. The four highways curve to the northeast and begin skirting along the northern edge of downtown as they travel underneath multiple NS rail lines and Marietta Street NW, north of the Coca-Cola headquarters, before curving back to the east. They travel just south of Georgia Tech, before crossing over I-75/I-85 (Downtown Connector). About 800 feet (240 m) later, they begin skirting along the northern edge of the Bank of America Plaza. This is about one block south of the AT&T Midtown Center and Fox Theatre. At the corner of Peachtree Street is the North Avenue Presbyterian Church. At the intersection with Piedmont Avenue NE, the four numbered highways turn left onto Piedmont for one block and turn to the right onto Ponce de Leon Avenue. Three blocks later, at the intersection with Argonne Avenue NE, US 29/US 78/US 278/SR 8 begin to skirt along the northern edge of Ponce de Leon Center. A few hundred feet later, they intersect Boulevard NE. They travel under a footbridge that carries the Eastside BeltLine Trail. Just to the east of the intersection with Bonaventure Avenue NE, the highways skirt along the northern edge of Freedom Park and intersect SR 10 (Freedom Parkway), which joins the concurrency. On the southeast side of the intersection is an entry point for the Freedom Park Trail and, less than 200 feet (61 m) later, is another entry point. At the intersection with North Highland Avenue NE, is the Plaza Theatre and Druid Hills Baptist Church. About a block and a half later, they intersect US 23 (Moreland Avenue NE) and SR 42 (Briarcliff Road NE). Here, US 23 joins the concurrency. At this intersection, the six highways enter DeKalb County.

=== DeKalb County ===
US 23/US 29/US 78/US 278/SR 8/SR 10 curve to the northeast, traveling between Springdale Park on the south and Springdale Park Elementary School and Howard School on the north. On the northwest corner of Brightwood Park, they pass St. John's Lutheran Church; then, they curve to the southeast and pass The Paideia School. A short distance past Fairview Road NE, they pass the Lullwater Estate, which is on the north side of Shady Side Park. After that, they skirt along the southwestern edge of the Druid Hills Golf Club. Just past Clifton Road NE, they begin to skirt along the northeastern edge of Dellwood Park before entering Druid Hills. On the eastern edge of the park, the concurrency is just south of the Fernbank Museum of Natural History. They cross over Lullwater Creek before beginning to skirt along the southern edge of Deepdene Park. At approximately the midway point of the park, US 278/SR 10 split off onto East Lake Drive NE, while US 23/US 29/US 78/SR 8 continue to the east, before curving to the north-northeast. Southeast of Fernbank Forest, the four highways curve back to the east and pass under a CSX railroad. They then curve to the northeast and cross over Peavine Creek before entering Decatur. After traveling through a mostly residential part of the city, they intersect SR 155 (Clairemont Avenue). Here, US 23 turns left, while US 29/US 78/SR 8 continue to the northeast. Less than 300 feet (91 m) after the northeastern intersection of Parkside Circle, the three highways enter North Decatur. At the intersection with DeKalb Industrial Way, they begin to travel between North Decatur and Scottdale. Shortly after intersecting Orion Drive, they cross over the South Fork Peachtree Creek. Less than 1,000 feet (300 m) later, US 78, concurrent with SR 410 splits off to the east-northeast (known as Stone Mountain Freeway), while US 29/SR 8 travel to the north-northeast on Lawrenceville Highway. This is an incomplete interchange, as there is no access from US 29/SR 8 south to US 78/SR 410 east or vice versa. This is on the southeast corner of North DeKalb Mall. Approximately 0.4 miles (0.64 km) later is an incomplete interchange with Valley Brook Road and North Druid Hills Road. The city limits of Scottdale pass through this interchange. The freeway crosses over the South Fork Peachtree Creek then under McClendon Road. After that, they cross over the creek again before reaching the Richard F. Sams Interchange with I-285 (Atlanta Bypass). At the Montreal Road overpass, the freeway begins to travel along the Clarkston–Tucker city line; then, they skirt along the southeastern edge of Tucker, before entering Tucker proper within the interchange with Brockett Road and Cooledge Road. Just northeast of this interchange, US 78/SR 410 travel just to the northwest of Idlewood Elementary School. Shortly before the Idlewood Road overpass, they begin to curve to a nearly due-east routing. The freeway crosses over the South Fork Peachtree Creek again. At this point, they skirt along the southeastern edge of the city limits and leave the city altogether within the interchange with the eastern terminus of SR 8 Conn. (Mountain Industrial Boulevard). Just before the end of this interchange, the freeway begins a gradual curve to the east-southeast before curving to the southeast. After going under the Juliette Road overpass, they have an interchange with SR 10 (Memorial Drive). At this interchange, SR 410 ends, and SR 10 begins to travel concurrently with US 78. Within the interchange, the roadway curves to the east-northeast. Almost immediately after the interchange, the freeway passes under the Silver Hill Road overpass and begins to skirt along the northwestern edge of Stone Mountain Park. A short distance later, they cross over Stone Mountain Creek, travel just to the north of the Stone Mountain Park Dam–North Dam and Stone Mountain Park Lake–North, and have an interchange with the former eastern terminus of SR 236 since 2024 (Hugh Howell Road). Here, the roadway enters Stone Mountain Park proper. The freeway crosses over Little Stone Mountain Creek before the westbound and eastbound lanes diverge from each other. The eastbound lanes curve to the southeast and meet an interchange with the main entrance of Stone Mountain Park. At this interchange, they curve back to the northeast and meet the westbound lanes again, just before leaving the boundary of the park and entering Gwinnett County.

=== Gwinnett County to Athens ===
Almost instantly, US 78/SR 10 enter Mountain Park. They have an interchange with West Park Place Boulevard and Rockbridge Road. The latter is only listed on westbound signage. The freeway crosses over West Park Place Boulevard on the Forrest L. Adair II Memorial Bridge and curves to the east-northeast. After this interchange, Stone Mountain Freeway ends and the numbered highways continue to the east-northeast. At an intersection with Camp Circle SW and Pucketts Road SW, the concurrency leaves Mountain Park. After a curve to the northeast, they curve back to the east-northeast and travel south of Lake Lucerne and the Opossum Lake Dam, before crossing over the Yellow River. They intersect the northern terminus of SR 264 (Bethany Church Road) and the southern terminus of Killian Hill Road at the erroneously termed Cpl Jonathan Ryan Akers Memorial Interchange. The concurrency passes Eternal Hills Cemetery; then, they enter Snellville, where they intersect SR 124 (Scenic Highway) at the James D. Mason Memorial Interchange. Here, US 78/SR 10 curve to the east-southeast and pass the Snellville Historical Cemetery. Almost immediately, they travel about one block north of Britt Elementary School. Just past the intersection with Skland Drive SW and Wisteria Drive SW, they pass South Gwinnett High School. Just past the school, the highways curve to the east-northeast. A little over 1,000 feet (300 m) later, they curve to the east-southeast. At an intersection with the southern terminus of SR 84 (Grayson Parkway) and the northern terminus of Rockdale Circle, they curve back to the east-northeast and travel north of Amitriain Lake. At an intersection with Crestview Drive, the two highways leave Snellville proper and skirt along the edge of the city limits for about 700 feet (210 m), where they leave the city altogether. On the northwest corner of Rosebud Park, they curve to the east-southeast. After traveling south of Tuggle Lake, they enter Loganville. In the city, they curve to the south-southeast. Just over 200 feet (61 m) after intersecting Logan Drive, US 78/SR 10 enter Walton County. (After the highway was expanded to four lanes in 1985 and rerouted near the Walton/Gwinnett border, the unexpanded portion formerly part of US 78 was renamed Logan Drive.)

In downtown Loganville, the concurrent highways intersect SR 20 (Main Street). They curve to the east-southeast and intersect SR 81 and the northern terminus of Cown Drive. At this intersection, SR 81 joins the concurrency. At Lee Byrd Road's southern terminus, SR 81 splits off to the south-southeast. US 78/SR 10 leave the city limits and cross over Big Flat Creek. They enter the city limits of Between and curve to the southeast. Right after leaving town, they curve to the east-southeast, and, approximately 550 feet (170 m) after intersecting the eastern terminus of Sardis Church Road, they curve to the east-northeast. Then, they curve back to the east-southeast and cross over the Alcovy River. A short distance after the river, US 78/SR 10 bypass the main part of Monroe on a freeway bypass. Their first exit is with the western terminus of SR 10 Business (West Spring Street). The bypass begins to curve to the east-northeast. Approximately 0.7 miles (1.1 km) after that interchange is the eastern terminus of SR 138. Less than 1 mile (1.6 km) after that is an interchange with SR 11 (North Broad Street). The two highways curve back to the east-southeast. Approximately 2 miles (3.2 km) later, they curve to the northeast have an interchange with the eastern terminus of SR 10 Business (East Spring Street), where the freeway bypass ends. Part of the highway is known as the Moina Michael Highway, named for Moina Michael, an American professor and humanitarian who conceived the idea of using poppies as a symbol of remembrance for those who served in World War I. US 78/SR 10 cross over Jacks Creek and intersect the northern terminus of SR 83 (Unisia Drive). Approximately 0.5 miles (0.80 km) after leaving Monroe, they travel through a rural area of the county and cross over the Apalachee River into Oconee County.

US 78/SR 10 continue to the northeast and intersect SR 53 (Hog Mountain Road). They curve to the east before curving to the north-northeast. They intersect Mars Hill Road (former SR 209) just before an interchange with US 29/SR 8/SR 316 (University Parkway), as well as the western terminus of US 78 Business. At this interchange, US 78 begins a concurrency with US 29/SR 8/SR 316 to the east-southeast; meanwhile, US 78 begins, concurrent with SR 10. The four highways travel south of Jennings Mill Country Club and curve to the southeast briefly. Just before intersecting the Oconee Connector, they begin a gradual curve to the east-northeast. They meet an interchange for SR 10 Loop (Athens Perimeter Highway) and the southern terminus of Epps Bridge Parkway. Here, US 29/US 78/SR 8/SR 10 Loop begin to travel concurrently to the east-southeast, while SR 316 meets its eastern terminus. Immediately after they curve to the southeast, the concurrent highways travel just north of Robinson Cemetery. They curve to the northeast and then to the east-northeast and have an interchange with US 129/US 441/SR 15 (Macon Highway) and the southern terminus of Timothy Road. In the western part of the interchange, Athens Perimeter Highway crosses over McNutt Creek into Clarke County and the city limits of Athens.

=== Athens–Clarke County ===
US 29/US 78/US 129/US 441/SR 8/SR 10 Loop, plus the unsigned SR 422, that is the hidden reference route numbering for the Athens Perimeter Highway, form one of the concurrencies in the state with seven component highways. They curve to the east-southeast and cross over the Middle Oconee River. Approximately 500 feet (150 m) later, the seven-highway route curves to the northeast and passes south of Athens Memorial Park. They have an interchange with the southern terminus of SR 15 Alternate (Milledge Avenue) northwest of the University of Georgia Golf Course. In the eastern part of the interchange, they cross over an NS rail line. They skirt along the southeastern edge of Oconee Forest Park, curving to the north-northeast. On the northeastern edge of the park, the concurrency has an interchange with College Station Road, which leads to the university. They pass east-southeast of Stegeman Coliseum, begin to curve to the northeast, and cross over the North Oconee River near the Georgia Museum of Art. They pass to the southeast of the Oconee Hill Cemetery. At the next interchange, US 78 leaves the concurrency to the east-northeast, concurrent with SR 10 again, while US 78 Business meets its eastern terminus. US 78/SR 10 travel to the east-southeast and pass to the south of the Athens Ben Epps Airport. At the intersection of Cherokee Road, they pass southwest of Satterfield Park. They skirt along the northeastern edge of the Southeast Clarke Park before crossing over Shoal Creek. Just prior to crossing over Big Creek, the concurrency begins to curve to the south-southeast. They curve to the east-southeast and then to the southeast before leaving the city limits of Athens and entering Oglethorpe County.

=== Athens to South Carolina ===
US 78/SR 10 continue to the southeast, crossing over Moss Creek. After a brief east-northeast section, they travel just south of the city limits of Arnoldsville, in an east-southeast direction. Just before entering Crawford, they cross over Barrow Creek. In town, they curve to the east-northeast, travel to the north of Crawford Cemetery, and curve to the northeast. On the northeastern edge of the city limits, the concurrency begins a gradual curve to the southeast, traveling north of Brooks Lake and the Brooks Lake Dam and southwest of a branch of the Oglethrope County Library. They also pass Oglethorpe County High School. Immediately after entering Lexington, US 78/SR 10 intersect SR 22 (Comer Road), which joins the currency. The three highways travel to the south-southeast to an intersection with SR 77 (Union Point Road), which also joins the concurrency. The four-highway concurrency curves to the southeast and passes the city's magistrate court. Approximately 1,000 feet (300 m) before leaving the city limits, SR 77 departs the concurrency to the north-northeast on Elberton Road. The three highways begin a curve to the east-southeast, and SR 22 departs the concurrency to the south-southeast on Crawfordville Road. US 78/SR 10 cross over Long Creek, before curving to the south-southeast and then to the east-southeast. They cross over Buffalo Creek, curve back to the southeast, and make an easterly jaunt. Southeast of the University of Georgia Farm Lake, the highways cross over Dry Fork Creek into Wilkes County.

Just after US 78/SR 10 begin a gradual curve to the southeast, they cross over Beaverdam Creek. They travel south of Rock Cemetery. Just over 1,000 feet (300 m) after intersecting the southern terminus of Centerville Road and the northern terminus of Richardson Road, they begin to travel through Rayle. In the center of town, they curve to the east. Just to the east of town, the highways curve to the east-northeast and curve back to the east-southeast and travel to the south of Washington–Wilkes Orchard Lake and the Washington–Wilkes Orchard Dam. They again curve to the east-northeast and bend to the southeast, passing the Washington–Wilkes County Airport. A little over 1 mile (1.6 km) before entering the city limits of Washington, they intersect the western terminus of US 78 Business/SR 10 Business. In the city, just west of the intersection with the northern terminus of Campbell Street, the mainline routes begin to curve to the east-southeast. They intersect SR 44 (North Mercer Street), which joins the concurrency. The three highways travel with the honorary designation of the Benjamin Wynn Fortson Jr Memorial Highway, named for Benjamin W. Fortson, Jr., a former Secretary of State of Georgia. After crossing Threemile Creek and intersecting South Elijah Clark Drive, they curve to the east-northeast. At the intersection with Carey Street, they begin to curve back to the east-southeast. They intersect SR 17 Business (known locally as Poplar Drive to the south and Tignall Road to the north). Here, SR 44 departs the concurrency to the north. After this intersection, US 78/SR 10 begin to curve to the south-southeast. They curve to the east and intersect SR 17, where the concurrency turns right, and all three highways travel to the south-southeast. The concurrent routes skirt along the eastern city limits of Washington and travel to the west of Booth Lake and the Booth Lake Dam, before very briefly re-entering Washington proper. Just before the intersection with Ann Denard Drive, they begin to skirt the city limits again. On the southeastern edge of the city, they intersect the eastern terminus of US 78 Business/SR 10 Business and the southern terminus of SR 17 Business (all three carry the Robert Toombs Avenue name), as well as the western terminus of US 378 (Lincolnton Road). Both directions also carry SR 47. US 78/SR 10/SR 17 travel to the south-southeast, known as the Sam McGill Memorial Parkway. Almost immediately, they begin to curve to the east-southeast. They intersect the southern terminus of the unsigned SR 47 Connector (Thomson Road) and the eastern terminus of Denard Road. They curve to the south-southeast and travel through rural areas of the county and skirt along the northeastern edge of the Washington–Wilkes Country Club. On the southeastern corner of the golf course, the three highways intersect the northern terminus of SR 80 (Wrightsboro Road). They curve to the east-southeast and back to the southeast. They cross over the Little River into McDuffie County.

US 78/SR 10/SR 17 continue to the southeast and cross over Hart Creek and Big Creek. They curve to the south-southeast and intersect the southern terminus of SR 43 (Lincolnton Road). Approximately 500 feet (150 m) later, they pass Pine Grove Cemetery. Just after they intersect Stagecoach Road, they skirt along the eastern edge of Belle Meade Country Club and then the Thomson–McDuffie County Airport. Just before they enter Thomson, they intersect the northern terminus of SR 17 Bypass (Thomson Bypass). At this intersection, US 78/SR 10 turn left and follow the bypass around the eastern side of the city, while SR 17 continues toward the main part of the city. The three highways curve to the south-southeast and cross over, but do not have an interchange with, I-20 (Carl Sanders Highway). The trio travels through the northeastern part of Thomson and intersect SR 150 (Cobbham Road). They leave the unmarked city limits and curve to the east, before coming back to the south-southeast and intersect SR 223 (White Oak Road). The concurrency curves to the south-southwest and crosses over a CSX rail line before intersecting US 278/SR 12 (Augusta Road). At this intersection, SR 12 meets its eastern terminus, and US 78/US 278/SR 10 travel to the southeast as Augusta Highway. SR 17 Bypass travels to the south-southwest, as well. The three highways stairstep their way to the southeast, crossing over Sweetwater Creek and traveling near Boneville. Southwest of Boneville, they cross over Boneville Stream. South of Boneville, they travel southwest of Boneville Pond. Just before the intersection with Wire Road and Ellington Airline Road, they curve to the east-northeast. Just to the west of Old Augusta Road, US 78/US 278/SR 10 curve to the east-southeast. They curve to the southeast and enter Dearing. In town, they curve to the east and intersect School Drive, which leads to Augusta Technical College's Adult Education Center and Dearing Elementary School. The concurrency curves to the northeast and then back to the east-southeast, before they cross over Boggy Gut Creek and enter Columbia County.

Approximately 600 feet (180 m) after entering the county, US 78/US 278/SR 10 enter the western city limits of Harlem. Just to the southeast of West Boundary Street, they travel about two and a half blocks south of Harlem Middle School. In the main part of town, they intersect US 221/SR 47 (Louisville Street). At the southeastern edge of the city limits, the roadway becomes known as Gordon Highway, which is a major urban corridor farther to the east. The highways travel through Campania and Berzelia. A few thousand feet later, they curve to the northeast, crossing into Richmond County (and the city limits of Augusta), and begin paralleling the northern edge of Fort Gordon.

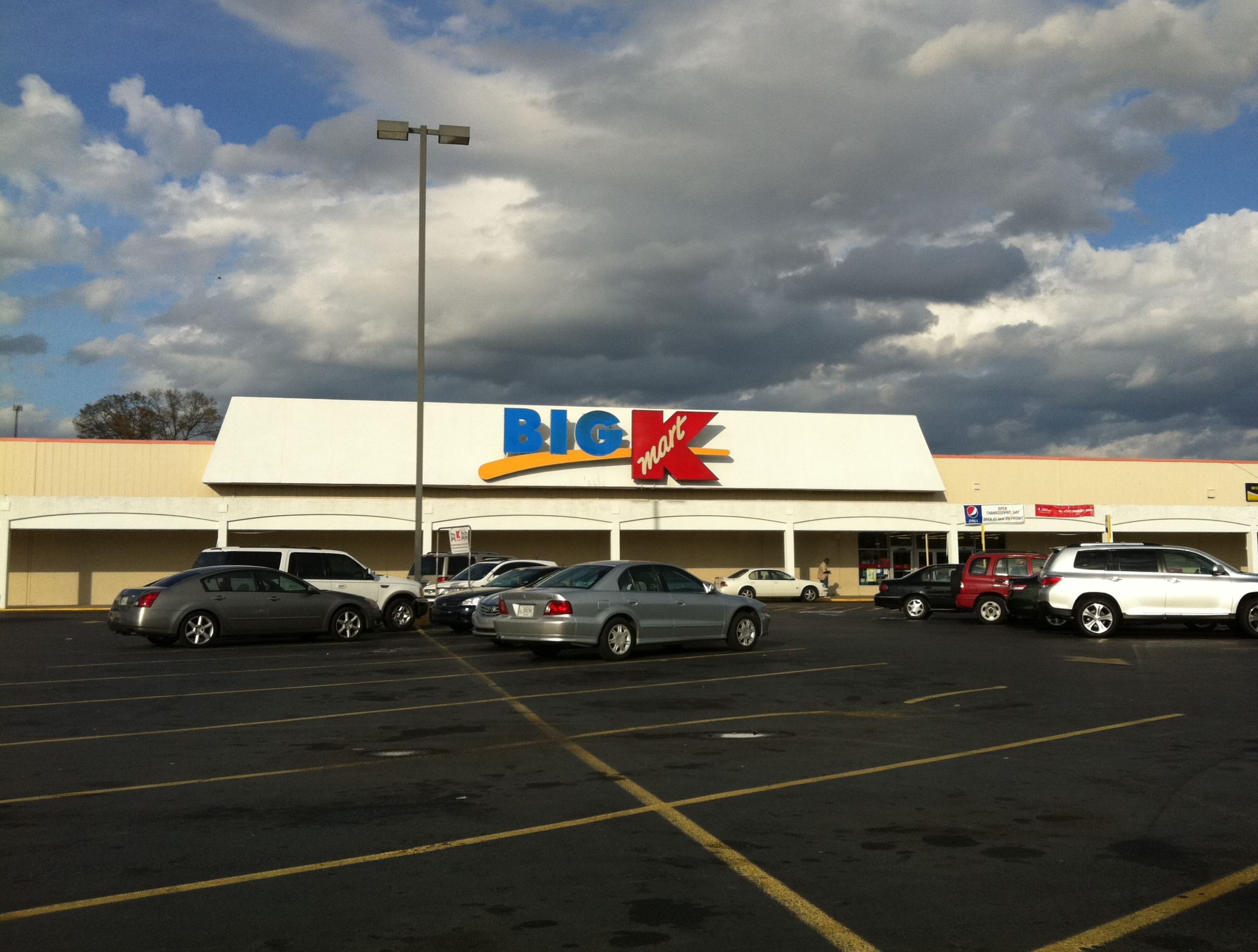
Kmart store on US 1/US 78/US 278/SR 10 (Gordon Highway)

US 78/US 278/SR 10 serve as the access point for Gordon Park Speedway and Augusta State Medical Prison. A short distance later is Fort Gordon's Gate 3, a commercial vehicle gate for the Army base and Gate 2, a variable-hour gate. At the intersection for Gate 2, the highway also intersects the eastern terminus of SR 223 (East Robinson Avenue). Approximately 3.4 miles (5.5 km) later is an intersection with the southern terminus of SR 383 (Jimmie Dyess Parkway) and the northern terminus of an access road to Fort Gordon's Gate 1, the 24-hour main gate for the base. About halfway between here and the interchange with I-520 (Bobby Jones Expressway), the three highways leave the edge of Fort Gordon and begin to transition into an urban corridor. After the interstate, the roadway enters the main part of Augusta, passing south of Aquinas High School, and curves to the south-southeast, past the location of the now-closed Regency Mall. Immediately after a slight curve to the east is an intersection with US 1/SR 4 (Deans Bridge Road). US 1 joins the concurrency, while SR 4 continues to the northeast into downtown. The four-highway concurrency curves slightly to the east-southeast to an interchange with US 25/SR 121 (Peach Orchard Road), which both join the concurrency. The six highways travel to the east-northeast and intersect the northern terminus of Doug Barnard Parkway (the former SR 56 Spur) and the southern terminus of Molly Pond Road. The highways curve to the north-northeast and intersect Laney–Walker Boulevard, thus effectively entering downtown. They pass just to the northwest of Magnolia Cemetery, Cedar Grove Cemetery, and May Park and southeast of James Brown Arena. A short distance later, they pass to the east of Old Medical College and the Old Government House, then they have an interchange with US 25 Business/SR 28 (Broad Street). Here, US 25 Business meets its southern terminus. Just after this interchange, the highways cross over the Savannah River into South Carolina. At the state line, SR 10 end, while US 1/US 25/US 78/US 278, concurrent with SC 121 curve to the northeast toward North Augusta.

=== National Highway System ===
The following segments of US 78 are included as part of the National Highway System, a system of roadways important to the nation's economy, defense, and mobility:

- From the US 278/SR 6 intersection in Lithia Springs, through the Atlanta metropolitan area, to the US 278/SR 12/SR 17 Byp. intersection just east of Thomson
- The entire segment in Richmond County

== History ==
=== 1920s ===
The road that would eventually be designated as US 78 was established as part of SR 8 from the Alabama state line to Decatur, SR 45 a point west of Loganville to Monroe (and possibly just to the east of it), SR 10 from Athens to Washington, SR 17 from Washington to Thomson, and SR 12 from Thomson to Augusta. By the end of 1921, SR 45 was extended from Ingleside to just west of Loganville. It was also from Monroe to a point about Bogart. Also, SR 16 was designated from the Alabama state line to Carrollton. By the end of 1926, SR 16 was redesignated as a southern branch of SR 8 from the Alabama state line to Villa Rica. US 78 was designated along the northern branch of SR 8, from the Alabama state line to Villa Rica, and mainline SR 8, from Villa Rica to Decatur. SR 45 was redesignated as SR 10 from Decatur to a point west of Loganville. SR 13 was designated from that point to Monroe, SR 8/10 were designated from Monroe to about Bogart, SR 10 was designated from either Athens or Lexington to Washington, SR 17 was designated from Washington to Thomson, and SR 12 was designated from either Thomson or Harlem to Augusta. In 1929, US 78's routing was split, with US 78N being designated on the northern branch of SR 8 (thereby replacing the mainline highway), while US 78S was designated on the southern branch of SR 8.

=== 1930s ===
Before 1932, US 78/SR 8 were paved from Carrollton to just southwest of Villa Rica, and from just west of Douglasville to Decatur. US 78/SR 10 were paved from Decatur to the DeKalb–Gwinnett county line; from about Bogart to about the Clarke–Oglethorpe county line; from east of the Oglethorpe–Wilkes county line to just south-southeast of Washington. SR 13 was paved from west of Loganville to Monroe. SR 12, and possibly SR 10, was paved from Thomson to Augusta. In January, SR 13, from west of Loganville to Monroe, was redesignated SR 20. SR 10 was designated along SR 17 from Washington to Thomson. Later that year, US 78/SR 8 were paved from Villa Rica to Douglasville. By the middle of 1933, US 78N/SR 8 were paved from Bremen to Villa Rica. Also, US 78/SR 10 were paved from Lexington to south-southwest of Washington. In May, US 78N/SR 8 were paved from east of the Alabama state line to Bremen. In June, US 78N/SR 8 were paved west to the Alabama state line. By the middle of 1934, the segment of the highway from Bogart to Washington was paved. By the end of the year, SR 20 was redesignated as part of SR 10. By the middle of 1935, a very brief section of US 78/SR 10 south of Bogart was paved. Two years later, US 78/SR 10 were paved from the Gwinnett–Cobb county line to about Snellville. By the end of 1938, US 78N was redesignated as part of the mainline US 78. Also, US 78/SR 10 were paved from about Snellville to Loganville, and from Monroe to the Walton–Oconee county line.

=== 1940s to 1980s ===
The 1946 map is the earliest one that showed the eastern part Atlanta on that city's inset. It showed, before 1947, US 78 routed along the current length of US 278 from Atlanta to the Belvedere Park–Avondale Estates city line, and SR 10 from that point to just north of Stone Mountain. This is before the Stone Mountain Freeway was built farther north. By the beginning of 1967, the Stone Mountain Freeway was established, from just southwest of its interchange with SR 236, to the Cobb–Gwinnett county line. Also, US 78/SR 10 were rerouted on the north side of Monroe on a freeway bypass. In 1967, the Stone Mountain Freeway was proposed to be extended to its western terminus. By the beginning of 1970, the Stone Mountain Freeway was completed. At the beginning of the 1980s, SR 12's eastern terminus was truncated at Thomson.

=== 2000s to 2010s ===
In 2007, an eastern bypass of Thomson was proposed. In the fall of 2010, US 78/SR 10 was shifted there.

== Major intersections ==
County	Location	mi	km	Exit	Destinations	Notes
Haralson		0.000	0.000		US 78 west (SR 4) / SR 8 begins – Heflin	Alabama state line; western terminus of SR 8; western end of SR 8 concurrency
Haralson	Hooper	1.284	2.066	Bently Bridge over the Tallapoosa River		
Haralson	Tallapoosa	3.963	6.378		SR 100 north (Robertson Avenue) – Buchanan, Cedartown	Western end of SR 100 concurrency
Haralson	Tallapoosa	4.092	6.585		SR 100 south (Head Avenue) to I-20 – Bowdon	Eastern end of SR 100 concurrency
Haralson	Tallapoosa	5.057	8.138		SR 100 Spur south	Northern terminus of SR 100 Spur
Haralson	Bremen	12.289	19.777		US 27 / SR 1 to I-20 – Cedartown, Carrollton	
Haralson	Bremen	13.459	21.660		US 27 Bus. / SR 1 Bus. (Hamilton Avenue / Alabama Avenue) – Buchanan, Carrollton	
Carroll	Temple	20.040	32.251		SR 274 east (James Street)	Western terminus of SR 274
Carroll	Temple	20.411	32.848		SR 113 (Carrollton Street) to I-20 – Temple, Carrollton	
Carroll	Temple	20.776	33.436		SR 274 west (Sage Street)	Eastern terminus of SR 274
Carroll	Villa Rica	25.796	41.515		SR 61 south / SR 101 (Industrial Boulevard) to I-20 – Rockmart, Carrollton	Western end of SR 61 concurrency
Carroll	Villa Rica	27.038	43.513		SR 61 north (North Carroll Road) – Dallas	Eastern end of SR 61 concurrency
Douglas	Villa Rica	28.245	45.456		SR 8 Conn. south (Mirror Lake Road) to I-20	Northern terminus of SR 8 Conn.
Douglas	Douglasville	35.847	57.690		SR 5 south (Bill Arp Road) to I-20	Western end of SR 5 concurrency
Douglas	Douglasville	38.410	61.815		SR 92 (Dallas Highway) to I-20 – Hiram, Dallas	
Douglas	Lithia Springs	44.921	72.293		US 278 west / SR 6 (Thornton Road) to I-20 – Powder Springs, Dallas	Western end of US 278 concurrency
Cobb	Austell	46.931	75.528	Dr. J.A. Griffith Bridge over Sweetwater Creek		
Cobb	Austell	47.179	75.927		SR 5 north (Austell Road) / Maxham Road – Marietta	Eastern end of SR 5 concurrency; interchange
Cobb	Mableton	49.654	79.910		SR 139 east (Mableton Parkway)	Western terminus of SR 139
Cobb	Mableton	53.163	85.558	Coogan Ray Bleodow Memorial Bridge over Nickajack Creek		
Fulton	Atlanta	54.933	88.406		SR 70 south (Fulton Industrial Boulevard Northwest) – Fulton County Airport	Northern terminus of SR 70
Fulton	Atlanta	55.212	88.855		I-285 (SR 407)	I-285 exit 12
Fulton	Atlanta	56.565	91.033		SR 280 (James Jackson Parkway Northwest / Hamilton E. Holmes Drive Northwest)	No left turn westbound
Fulton	Atlanta	60.489	97.348		US 19 north / US 41 north / SR 3 north (Northside Drive Northwest)	Western end of US 19/US 41/SR 3 concurrency
Fulton	Atlanta	60.793	97.837		US 19 south / US 41 south / SR 3 south / US 29 south (Northside Drive Northwest)	Eastern end of US 19/US 41/SR 3 concurrency; western end of US 29 concurrency
Fulton	Atlanta	61.739	99.359		Spring Street Northwest to I-75 / I-85	I-75 exit 249D
Fulton	Atlanta	63.505	102.201		SR 10 west (Freedom Parkway Northeast) – Carter Center	Western end of SR 10 concurrency
Fulton–DeKalb county line	Atlanta	64.139	103.222		US 23 south (Briarcliff Road Northeast / Moreland Avenue Northeast) / SR 42	Western end of US 23 concurrency
DeKalb	Druid Hills	65.819	105.925		US 278 east / SR 10 east (East Lake Road)	Eastern end of US 278 and SR 10 concurrencies
DeKalb	Decatur	67.282	108.280		US 23 north / SR 155 (Clairemont Avenue) – Atlanta VA Medical Center, Agnes Scott College	Eastern end of US 23 concurrency
DeKalb	Scottdale–North Decatur line	69.503	111.854		US 29 north / SR 8 east (Lawrenceville Highway) – Lawrenceville, Athens	Eastern end of US 29 and SR 8 concurrencies; western end of SR 410 concurrency; western end of Stone Mountain Freeway; eastbound exit and westbound entrance
DeKalb	Scottdale	69.888	112.474	1	Valley Brook Road / North Druid Hills Road	Westbound exit and eastbound entrance
DeKalb	Scottdale–Clarkston line	71.019	114.294	2	I-285 (SR 407) – Greenville, Chattanooga, Augusta, Macon	I-285 exit 39A-B
DeKalb	Tucker	72.258	116.288	3	Brockett Road / Cooledge Road	
DeKalb	Tucker	74.342	119.642	4	Mountain Industrial Boulevard (SR 8 Conn. west) – Tucker	Eastern terminus of SR 8 Conn.
DeKalb		76.750	123.517	5	SR 10 west (Memorial Drive west) – Stone Mountain Village	Eastern terminus of SR 410; eastern end of SR 410 concurrency; western end of SR 10 concurrency
DeKalb	Stone Mountain Park	77.467	124.671	7	Hugh Howell Road – Tucker	Former eastern terminus of SR 236 since 2024
DeKalb	Stone Mountain Park	78.650	126.575	8	Stone Mountain Park Main Entrance	
DeKalb	Stone Mountain Park–Mountain Park line	79.307	127.632	9	West Park Place Boulevard / Rockbridge Road	East end of Stone Mountain Freeway
Gwinnett		82.520	132.803		SR 264 south (Bethany Church Road) – Centerville	Northern terminus of SR 264
Gwinnett	Snellville	85.718	137.950		SR 124 (Scenic Highway) – Lawrenceville, Centerville, Lithonia	
Gwinnett	Snellville	87.279	140.462		SR 84 east (Grayson Parkway) – Grayson	Western terminus of SR 84
Walton	Loganville	93.131	149.880		SR 20 (Main Street) – Lawrenceville, Conyers	
Walton	Loganville	93.995	151.270		SR 81 north (Lawrenceville Highway) – Lawrenceville, Winder	Western end of SR 81 concurrency
Walton	Loganville	94.385	151.898		SR 81 south – Covington, Oxford	Eastern end of SR 81 concurrency
Walton		102.399	164.795		SR 10 Bus. east (West Spring Street) – Monroe	Western terminus of SR 10 Bus.; westbound entrance and eastbound exit; west end of freeway
Walton	Monroe	103.258	166.178		SR 138 – Conyers	No westbound entrance
Walton	Monroe	104.157	167.624		SR 11 – Monroe, Winder	
Walton	Monroe	105.920	170.462		SR 10 Bus. west (East Spring Street) – Monroe	Eastern terminus of SR 10 Bus.; eastbound entrance and westbound exit; east end of freeway
Walton	Monroe	106.830	171.926		SR 83 south (Unisia Drive) – Madison	Northern terminus of SR 83
Oconee	Ashland	115.438	185.779		SR 53 – Winder, Watkinsville	
Oconee		119.687	192.618		US 29 south / SR 8 west / SR 316 west / US 78 Bus. east / SR 10 east (Monroe Highway) – Atlanta, Athens, Bogart	Eastern end of SR 10 concurrency; western end of US 29/SR 8 and SR 316 concurrencies; western terminus of US 78 Bus.; interchange
Oconee		122.588	197.286		Oconee Connector (SR 992 south)	Interchange
Oconee		123.426	198.635		SR 10 Loop inner (SR 422) to US 78 Bus. / I-85 north / Epps Bridge Parkway – West Athens	West end of freeway; US 78 west follows exit 1; eastern terminus of SR 316; east end of SR 316 concurrency; west end of SR 10 Loop concurrency
Clarke	Athens	126.251	203.181	4	US 129 south / US 441 south / SR 15 south / Timothy Road – Watkinsville, Madison	West end of US 129/US 441/SR 15 concurrency; signed as exits 4A (south) and 4B (north) westbound
Clarke	Athens	127.904	205.842	6	SR 15 Alt. north (Milledge Avenue)	Southern terminus of SR 15 Alt.
Clarke	Athens	129.012	207.625	7	College Station Road – University of Georgia	
Clarke	Athens	130.165	209.480		US 29 north / US 129 north / US 441 north / SR 10 Loop outer (SR 8 east / SR 15 north / SR 422 outer) / US 78 Bus. west / SR 10 west (Oconee Street) – Danielsville, Commerce, Jefferson, Hartwell, Athens	Eastern end of US 29/SR 8, SR 10 Loop, and US 129/US 441/SR 15 concurrencies; western end of SR 10 concurrency; eastern terminus of US 78 Bus.; east end of freeway; US 78 follows exit 8.
Oglethorpe	Lexington	145.848	234.720		SR 22 east (Comer Road) – Comer, Royston, Watson Mill Bridge State Park	Western end of SR 22 concurrency
Oglethorpe	Lexington	146.151	235.207		SR 77 south (Union Point Road) – Union Point, Siloam, Woodville	Western end of SR 77 concurrency
Oglethorpe	Lexington	146.734	236.145		SR 77 north (Elberton Road) – Elberton, Hartwell, Lake R.B. Russell State Park	Eastern end of SR 77 concurrency
Oglethorpe		147.904	238.028		SR 22 west (Crawfordville Road) – Philomath, Crawfordville	Eastern end of SR 22 concurrency
Wilkes		168.569	271.286		US 78 Bus. east / SR 10 Bus. east (Lexington Avenue) – Union Point, Washington Business District	Western terminus of US 78 Bus./SR 10 Bus.
Wilkes	Washington	170.748	274.792		SR 44 south (Mercer Street) – Union Point	Western end of SR 44 concurrency
Wilkes	Washington	171.603	276.168		SR 17 Bus. (Tignall Road / Poplar Drive) / SR 44 north – Elberton, Tignall, Washington, Danburg	Eastern end of SR 44 concurrency
Wilkes	Washington	172.204	277.135		SR 17 north – Tignall, Elberton	Western end of SR 17 concurrency
Wilkes	Washington	173.290	278.883		US 378 east / US 78 Bus. west / SR 47 / SR 10 Bus. west (R. Toombs Avenue) – Lincolnton, Washington CBD, Crawfordville, Elijah Clark State Park	Eastern terminus of US 78 Bus./SR 10 Bus.; southern terminus of SR 17 Bus.; western terminus of US 378
Wilkes		173.497	279.216		SR 47 Conn. north	Southern terminus of SR 47 Conn.
Wilkes		175.775	282.882		SR 80 south (Wrightsboro Road) to I-20 – Warrenton	Northern terminus of SR 80
McDuffie		191.406	308.038		SR 43 north (Lincolnton Road) – Lincolnton, Elijah Clark State Park	Southern terminus of SR 43
McDuffie		193.284	311.060		SR 17 south (SR 17 Byp. begins / Washington Road) to I-20 – Thomson	Eastern end of SR 17 concurrency; northern terminus of SR 17 Byp.; western end of SR 17 Byp. concurrency
McDuffie	Thomson	196.105	315.600		SR 150 – Clarks Hill, Thomson	
McDuffie	Thomson	197.449	317.763		SR 223 – Appling, Grovetown, Thomson	
McDuffie	Thomson	198.884	320.073		US 278 west / SR 12 west / SR 17 Byp. south (Thomson Bypass) – Thomson, Warrenton, Wrens	Eastern end of SR 17 Byp. concurrency; western end of US 278 concurrency; eastern terminus of SR 12
Columbia	Harlem	209.940	337.866		US 221 / SR 47 (North Louisville Street) to I-20 – Appling, Wrens	
Richmond	Augusta	218.791	352.110		SR 223 west (Robinson Avenue) – Grovetown, Fort Gordon Recreation Area, Fort Gordon Gate 2, United States Army Signal Corps Museum	Eastern terminus of SR 223
Richmond	Augusta	222.208	357.609		SR 383 north (Jimmie Dyess Parkway) to I-20 – Fort Gordon, United States Army Signal Corps Museum	Southern terminus of SR 383
Richmond	Augusta	224.916	361.967		I-520 (Bobby Jones Expressway / SR 415) to I-20 – Columbia, Atlanta, Bush Field	I-520 exit 3
Richmond	Augusta	228.248	367.330		US 1 south / SR 4 (Deans Bridge Road) – Augusta, Wrens, Louisville	Western end of US 1 concurrency
Richmond	Augusta	229.476	369.306		US 25 south / SR 121 south (Peach Orchard Road) – Waynesboro	Western end of US 25 and SR 121 concurrencies; interchange
Richmond	Augusta	230.781	371.406		Molly Pond Road north / Doug Barnard Parkway south – Augusta Regional Airport	Southern terminus of Molly Pond Road; northern terminus of Doug Barnard Parkway; former SR 56 Spur south
Richmond	Augusta	233.302	375.463		US 25 Bus. north / SR 28 (Broad Street) – Downtown Augusta, Fort Discovery	Interchange; southern terminus of US 25 Bus.; also serves Bay Street; eastbound lanes have access via Bay Street.
Richmond	Augusta	233.556	375.872		US 1 north / US 25 north / US 78 east / US 278 east / SC 121 north / SR 10 ends – Columbia	South Carolina state line (Savannah River bridge; eastern end of SR 10 concurrency; eastern terminus of SR 10; SR 121 continues as SC 121 at the state line)
1.000 mi = 1.609 km; 1.000 km = 0.621 mi: Concurrency terminus; Incomplete access

== See also ==
U.S. Route 78
Previous state: Alabama	Georgia	Next state: South Carolina
