= Carter Presidential Center =

Carter Presidential Center can refer to:

- Carter Center
- Jimmy Carter Library and Museum
