= Georgia State Route 84 =

State highway in Georgia, United States

State Route 84
- Grayson Parkway
- SR 84 highlighted in red

Route information
- Maintained by GDOT
- Length: 3.6 mi (5.8 km)

Major junctions
- West end: US 78 / SR 10 in Snellville
- East end: SR 20 in Grayson

Location
- Country: United States
- State: Georgia
- Counties: Gwinnett

Highway system
- Georgia State Highway System; Interstate; US; State; Special
← US 84	→ I-85

State Route 84 (SR 84), also known as Grayson Parkway, or Georgia 84, is a 3.6-mile-long (5.8 km) state highway, located entirely within the south-central part of Gwinnett County in the U.S. state of Georgia. It connects US 78/SR 10 in Snellville with SR 20 in Grayson. It is Georgia's shortest two-digit state route.

== Route description ==
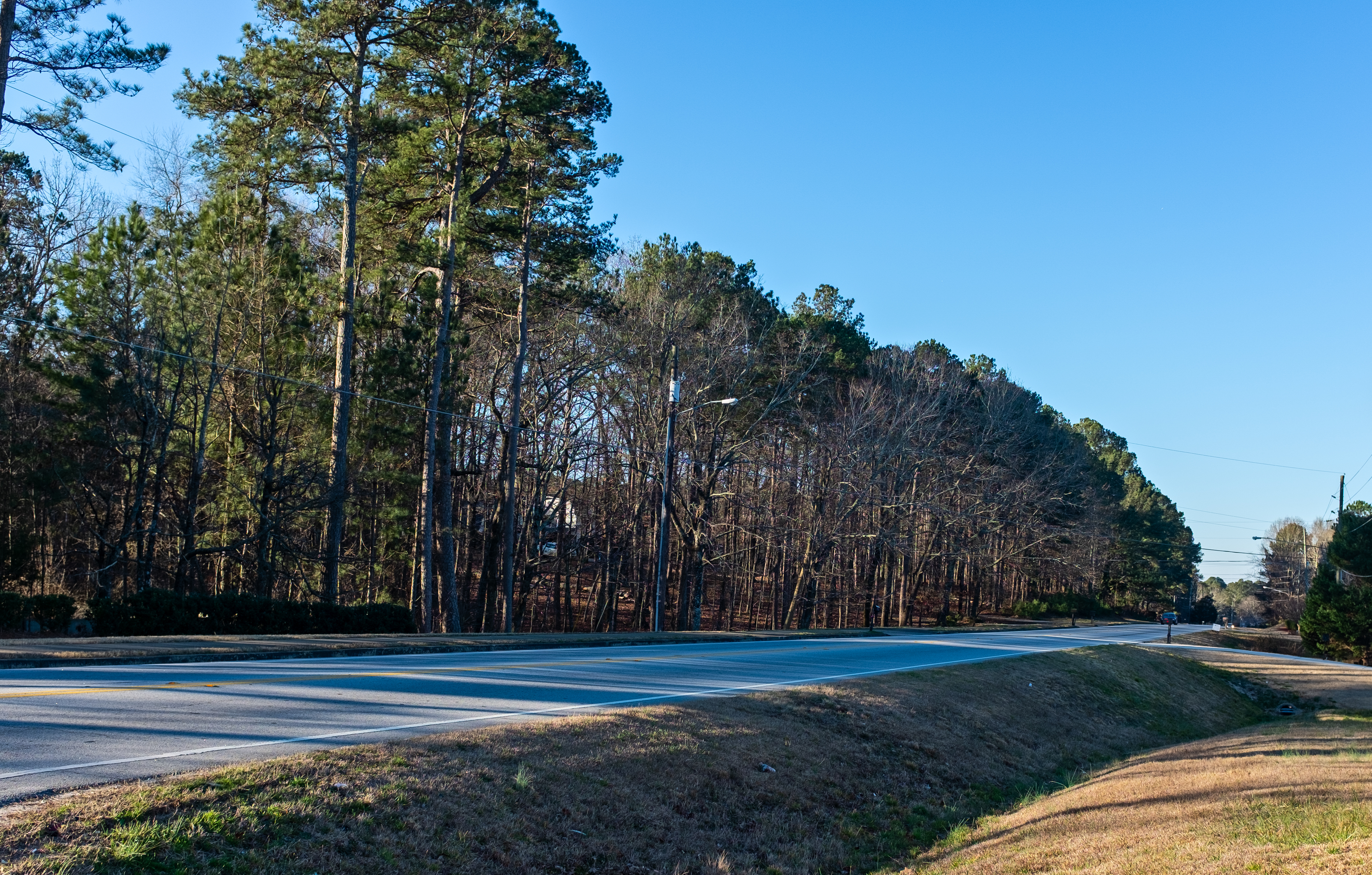
SR 84

SR 84 begins at an intersection with US 78/SR 10 (known as Main Street East SW west of this intersection and Athens Highway east of it) in the southeastern part of Snellville. Here, the roadway continues to the south-southwest as Rockdale Circle SW. SR 84 heads north-northeast on Grayson Parkway, through partially rural and residential areas. Almost immediately, it leaves the city limits of Snellville. Just before meeting the northern terminus of Falcon Ridge Drive, it begins to curve to the northeast. Just before intersecting the western terminus of Lakemeadow Lane, it curves back to the north-northeast. After entering the city of Grayson, it curves back to the northeast. Just before an intersection with the southern terminus of Rock Springs Road SW, the highway curves back to the north-northeast. Just after this intersection, it passes the Gwinnett County Public Library's Grayson Branch. Right after this library, the highway curves back to the northeast. After an intersection with Rosebud Road SW, it passes Grayson Park. Then, it passes the city hall of the city and Grayson Elementary School. A short distance later, it meets its eastern terminus, an intersection with SR 20 (known as Grayson Highway SW west of this intersection and Loganville Highway SW east of it). Here, the roadway continues to the northeast as Grayson–New Hope Road SE.

== History ==
SR 84 is not a major route. It is less than 4 miles (6.4 km) long. However, the highway is one of Georgia's earliest routes, established in the 1930s.

== Major intersections ==
The entire route is in Gwinnett County.

Location	mi	km	Destinations	Notes
Snellville	0.0	0.0	US 78 / SR 10 (Main Street East SW west / Athens Highway east) / Rockdale Circle SW south – Stone Mountain, Decatur, Atlanta, Loganville	Western terminus; roadway continues as Rockdale Circle SW; provides access to Eastside Medical Center – South Campus.
Grayson	3.6	5.8	SR 20 (Grayson Highway SW west / Loganville Highway SW east) / Grayson–New Hope Road SE east – Lawrenceville, Loganville	Eastern terminus; roadway continues as Grayson–New Hope Road SE.
1.000 mi = 1.609 km; 1.000 km = 0.621 mi
