= Georgia State Route 150 =

State highway in Georgia, United States

State Route 150
- SR 150 highlighted in red

Route information
- Maintained by GDOT
- Length: 25.3 mi (40.7 km)

Major junctions
- West end: SR 17 in Thomson
- US 78 / SR 10 / SR 17 Byp. in Thomson; I-20 northeast of Thomson; US 221 / SR 47 / SR 104 in Pollards Corner
- East end: US 221 at the South Carolina state line southwest of Clarks Hill

Location
- Country: United States
- State: Georgia
- Counties: McDuffie, Columbia

Highway system
- Georgia State Highway System; Interstate; US; State; Special
← SR 149	→ SR 151

State Route 150 (SR 150) is a 25.3-mile-long (40.7 km) state highway that travels southwest–to–northeast through portions of McDuffie and Columbia counties in the east-central part of the U.S. state of Georgia. It travels from Thomson northeast to the South Carolina state line, southwest of Clarks Hill, South Carolina.

== Route description ==
=== McDuffie County ===
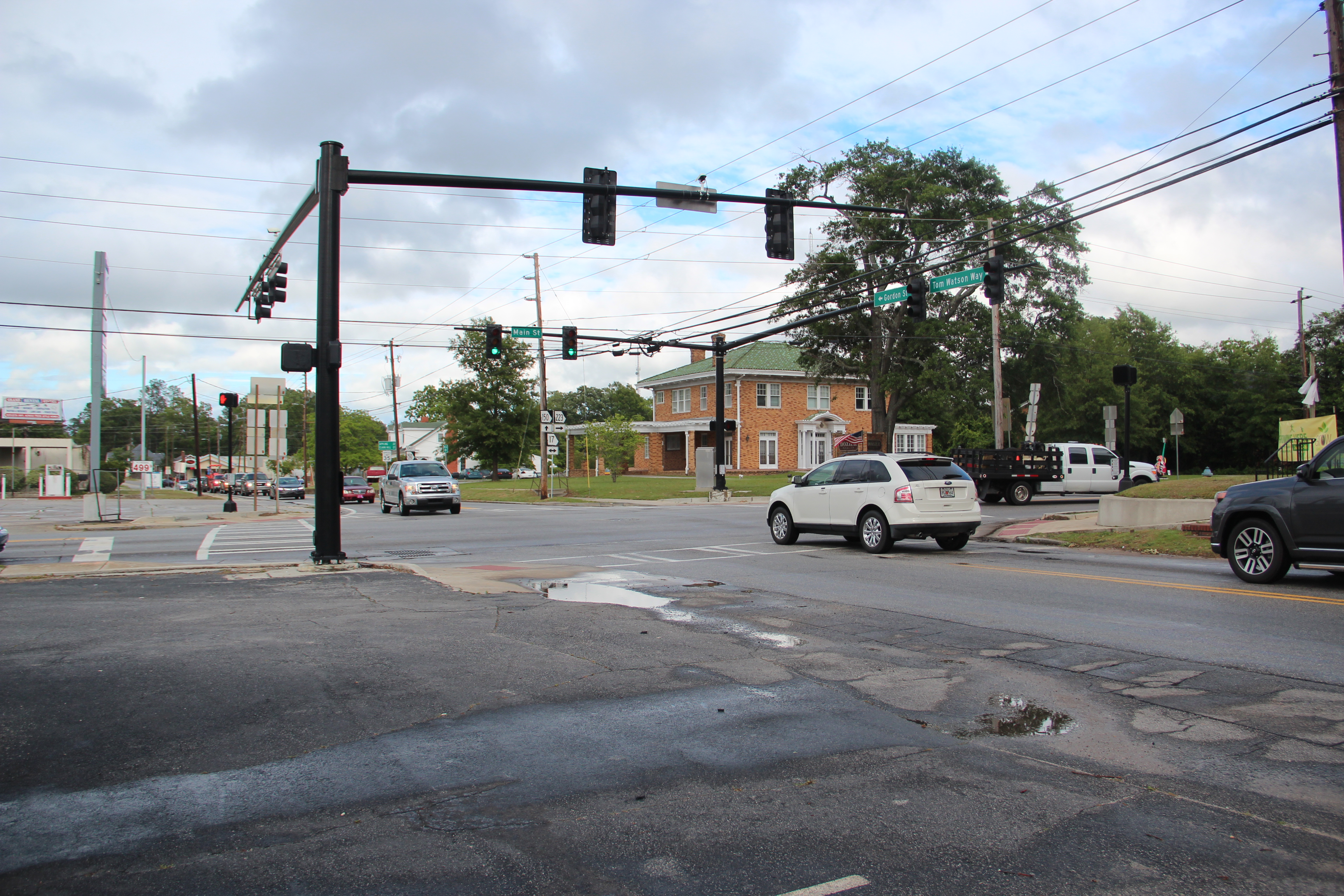
State Route 150 in Thomson, May 2017

SR 150 begins at an intersection with SR 17 (Main Street) in Thomson. It heads northeast to an intersection with US 78/SR 10/SR 17 Byp. (Thomson Bypass), just before leaving the city. Northeast of Thomson is an interchange with Interstate 20 (I-20; Carl Sanders Highway). Between I-20 and the unincorporated community of Pollards Corner, SR 150 travels along the McDuffie–Columbia county line.

=== Columbia County ===
It continues to the northeast to a five-way intersection in Pollards Corner with U.S. Route 221 (US 221) and the western terminus of SR 104 (Washington Road), SR 47 splits off to travel concurrently with US 221 south, while SR 150 splits off to travel concurrent with US 221 north. SR 150 follows US 221 until they reach the South Carolina state line, where US 221 crosses over the Clarks Hill Dam and continues northeast to Clarks Hill. From Thomson to Pollards Corner, SR 150 is known as Cobbham Road.

== Major intersections ==
County	Location	mi	km	Destinations	Notes
McDuffie	Thomson	0.0	0.0	SR 17 (Main Street) to SR 223 east – Wrens, Warrenton, Augusta, Macon, Washington	Western terminus
McDuffie	Thomson	1.4	2.3	US 78 / SR 10 / SR 17 Byp. (Thomson Bypass) – Washington, Harlem	
McDuffie		4.4	7.1	I-20 (Carl Sanders Highway / SR 402) – Atlanta, Augusta	I-20 exit 175
Columbia	Pollards Corner	19.6	31.5	SR 47 west (Washington Road) – Lincolnton	Western end of SR 47 concurrency
Columbia	Pollards Corner	19.7	31.7	US 221 south / SR 47 east (Scotts Ferry Road) / SR 104 east (Washington Road) – Harlem, Augusta	Eastern end of SR 47 concurrency; western end of US 221 concurrency; western terminus of SR 104
Savannah River		25.3	40.7	Eastern terminus at the South Carolina state line; Clarks Hill Dam; US 221 continues to Clarks Hill, South Carolina; eastern end of US 221 concurrency	
1.000 mi = 1.609 km; 1.000 km = 0.621 mi: Concurrency terminus

== See also ==
- List of highways numbered 150
