= Centerville, Gwinnett County, Georgia =

- Unincorporated community
- Location within the state of Georgia Centerville (the United States)
- Coordinates: 33°48′13″N 84°02′35″W
- Country: United States
- State: Georgia
- County: Gwinnett
- Elevation: 925 ft (282 m)

Population (2010)(Centerville and Snellville combined)
  - Total: 18,242
- Time zone: UTC-5 (Eastern (EST))
  - Summer (DST): UTC-4 (EDT)
- ZIP codes: 30039
- Area codes: 770, 678, 404
- FIPS code: 1371604
- GNIS feature ID: 312513

Centerville is an unincorporated community in Gwinnett County, Georgia, United States. Centerville is located south of Snellville and is situated around the intersections of State Routes 124 and 264. A part of Rockdale County may also be considered to be in Centerville.

== History ==
A post office was in operation at Centerville from 1878 until 1903. An early variant name was "Sneezer".

== Education ==
The Centerville area is served by Gwinnett County Public Schools.

The area has the Centerville Branch of the Gwinnett County Public Library system, which shares a building with the Centerville Community Center and the Snellville Branch that is neighbor to Thomas W. Briscoe Park in Snellville.
