= Georgia State Route 264 =

State highway in Georgia, United States

State Route 264
- Bethany Church Road
- SR 264 highlighted in red

Route information
- Maintained by GDOT
- Length: 2.7 mi (4.3 km)
- Existed: 1949–present

Major junctions
- West end: US 78 / SR 10 southwest of Snellville
- East end: SR 124 north of Centerville

Location
- Country: United States
- State: Georgia
- Counties: Gwinnett

Highway system
- Georgia State Highway System; Interstate; US; State; Special
← SR 262	→ SR 266

State Route 264 (SR 264) is a 2.7-mile-long (4.3 km) northwest-southeast state highway located in the eastern part of the Atlanta metropolitan area in the U.S. state of Georgia. Its route is entirely within Gwinnett County.

== Route description ==
SR 264 begins at an intersection with US 78/SR 10 (Stone Mountain Highway) southwest of Snellville. Here, the roadway continues as Killian Hill Road SW. Just after its western terminus, the route runs along the west side of the Mountain View Village Shopping Center. South of the shopping center is Shiloh Road, which leads to Shiloh Elementary School, Shiloh Middle School, and Shiloh High School. The road curves to the southeast and crosses Jacks Creek. Southeast of that crossing is Centerville Public Library. SR 264 continues to the southeast, until it meets its eastern terminus, an intersection with SR 124 (Centerville Highway) north of Centerville. At its eastern terminus, the roadway continues as Zoar Road SW. The route is known as Bethany Church Road for its entire length.

No section of SR 264 is part of the National Highway System, a system of routes determined to be the most important for the nation's economy, mobility and defense.

== History ==
SR 264 was established in 1949 along the same alignment as it travels today. By 1955, the entire route was paved.

== Major intersections ==
The entire route is in Gwinnett County.

Location	mi	km	Destinations	Notes
	0.0	0.0	US 78 / SR 10 (Stone Mountain Highway) – Stone Mountain, Snellville, Decatur, Atlanta	Western terminus; roadway continues as Killian Hill Road SW.
	2.7	4.3	SR 124 (Centerville Highway) – Centerville, Gwinnett County, Snellville	Eastern terminus; roadway continues as Zoar Road SW.
1.000 mi = 1.609 km; 1.000 km = 0.621 mi
