= Jimmy Carter Library and Museum =

Library in Atlanta, Georgia, US

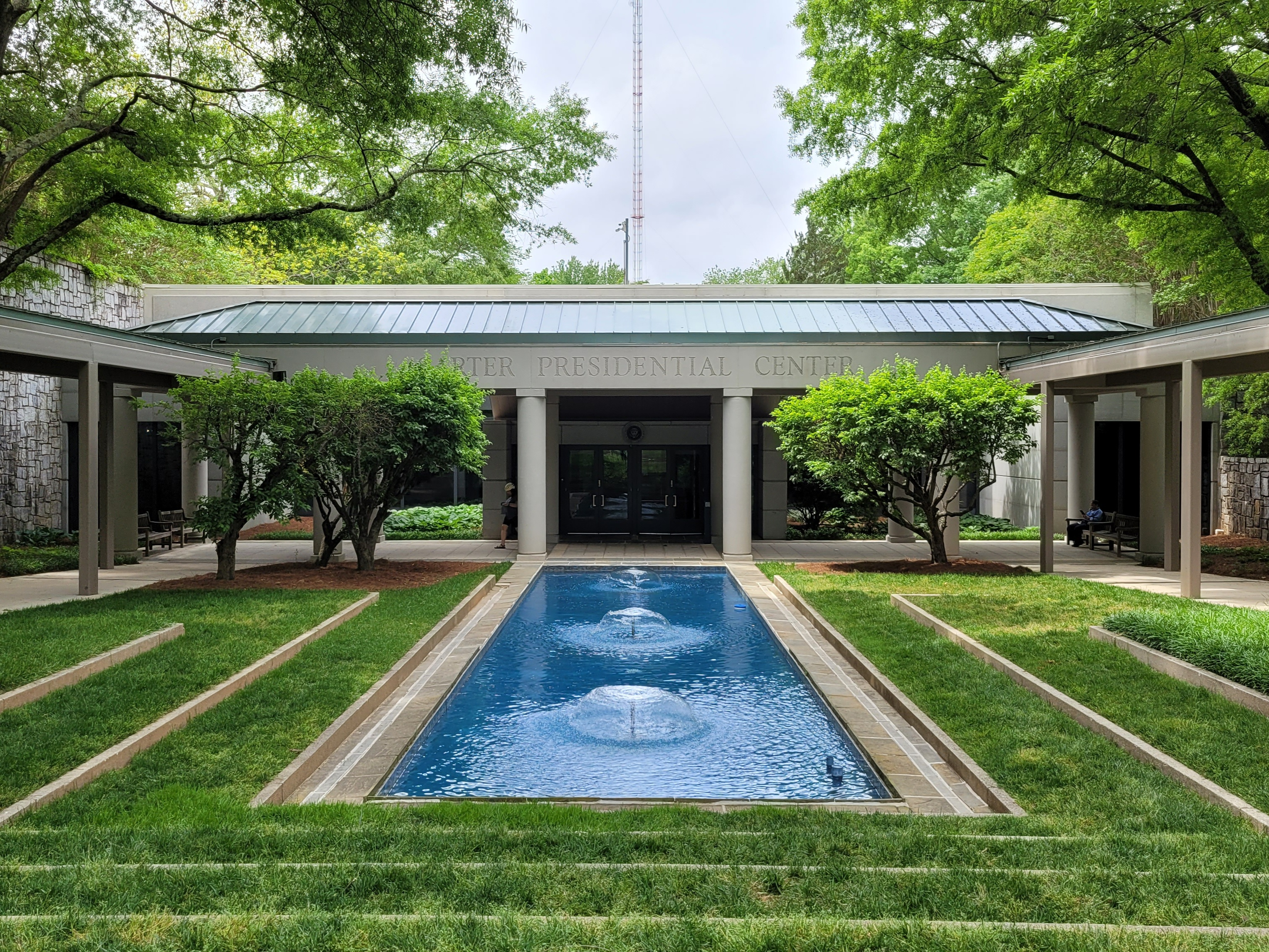
- The Jimmy Carter Library and Museum in 2024
- Interactive map of the Jimmy Carter Library and Museum area

General information
- Location: Atlanta, Georgia, US
- Coordinates: 33°45′59″N 84°21′23″W
- Named for: Jimmy Carter
- Construction started: October 2, 1984; 41 years ago
- Inaugurated: Dedicated on October 1, 1986; 39 years ago
- Cost: $26 million USD
- Operator: National Archives and Records Administration, Carter Center

Technical details
- Size: 69,750 ft^{2} (6,480 m^{2})

Website
- www.jimmycarterlibrary.gov

The Jimmy Carter Library and Museum in Atlanta, Georgia, houses U.S. president Jimmy Carter's papers and other material relating to the Carter administration and the Carter family's life. The library also hosts special exhibits, such as Carter's Nobel Peace Prize and a full-scale replica of the Oval Office as it was during the Carter Administration, including a reproduction of the Resolute desk.

The Carter Library and Museum includes some parts that are owned and administered by the federal government, and some that are privately owned and operated. The library and museum are run by the National Archives and Records Administration and are part of the presidential library system of the federal government. Privately owned areas house Carter's offices and the offices of the Carter Center, a non-profit human rights agency.

The building housing the library and museum makes up 69,750 square feet (6,480 square metres), with 15,269 square feet (1,418.5 square metres) of space for exhibits and 19,818 square feet (1,841.2 square metres) of archive and storage space. The library contains approximately 600,000 photographs, 1,550 video recordings, 27 million documents, and 3,700 audio recordings related to Carter's presidency.

The complex is situated next to John Lewis Freedom Parkway, which was originally called "Presidential Parkway" (and at one point, "Jimmy Carter Parkway") in its planning stages. The land on which the museum sits was a part of General Sherman's headquarters during the Civil War's Battle of Atlanta.

Although President Herbert Hoover and almost all Presidents since (except John F. Kennedy and Lyndon B. Johnson) have chosen to be buried at their presidential museum, Jimmy and Rosalynn Carter chose to instead be interred on the grounds of their home in Plains, Georgia. The Carters also made arrangements for their home, which is owned by the National Park Service and is part of the Jimmy Carter National Historical Park, to be converted into a museum.

== History ==
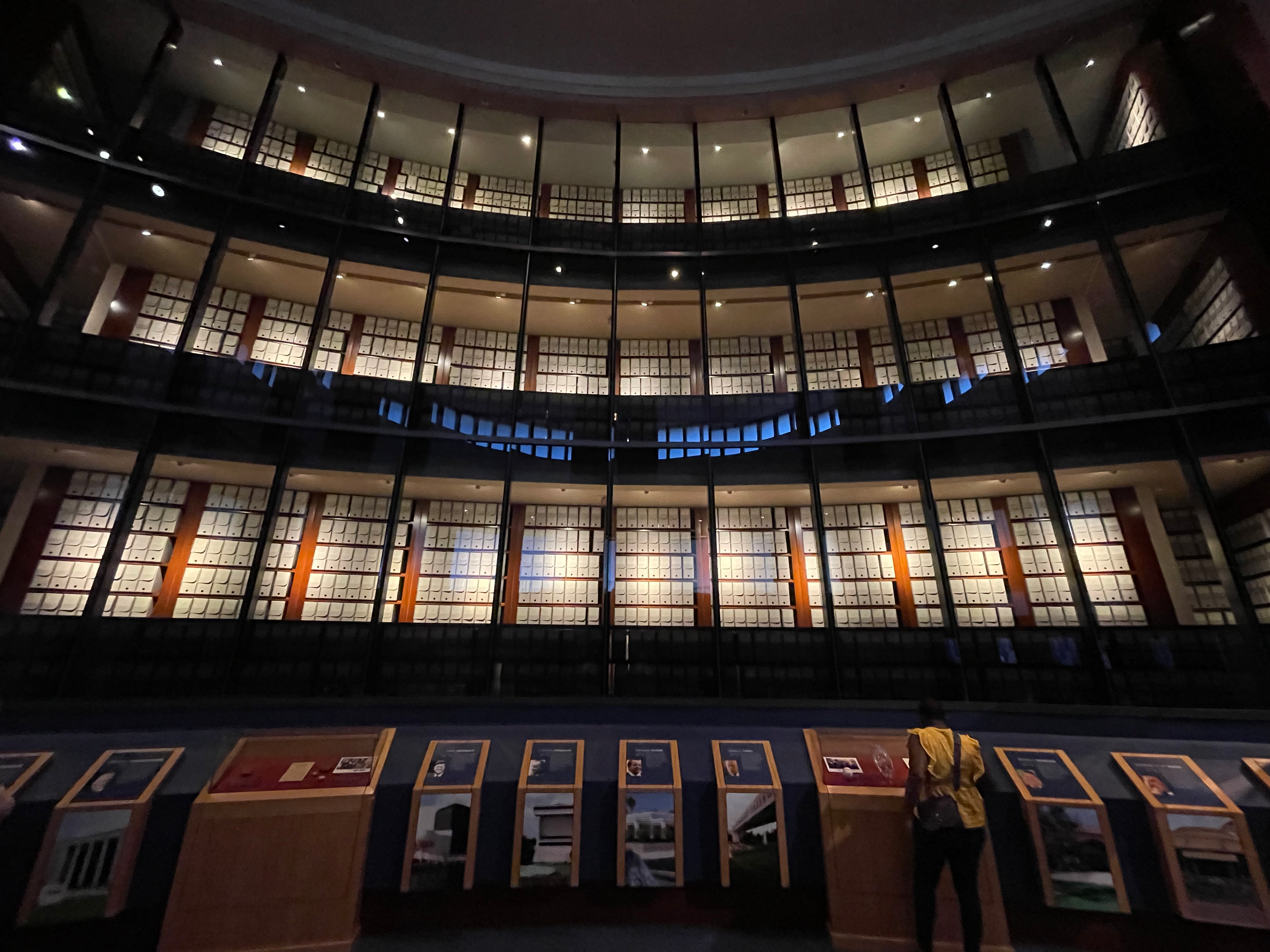
The library viewed from within the museum

Early in his administration, Carter indicated interest in having his presidential library be built in Georgia. The site chosen was in the Poncey–Highland neighborhood of Atlanta, on land that had been acquired by the state of Georgia Department of Transportation, for an interchange between two redundant highways that were cancelled by Carter when he was governor of Georgia, in response to the Atlanta freeway revolts. (See Interstate 485, Georgia 400, Interstate 675, and the Stone Mountain Freeway.)

The Atlanta firm of Jova/Daniels/Busby was selected as architects, in cooperation with Lawton/Umemura/Yamamoto of Hawaii. During design and construction, Carter's papers were temporarily housed at the former post office building in downtown Atlanta. Construction commenced on October 2, 1984, and the library was opened to the public on Carter's 62nd birthday, October 1, 1986. Construction cost $26 million, funded by private contributions.

A $10 million renovation of the museum began in April 2009 with completion on President Carter's 85th birthday in October 2009.

A tour of the museum, 2021

The first director of the library and museum was Dr. Donald Schewe, who originally assisted with the transfer and processing of the Carter Administration materials at the end of Carter's term in early 1981.

Since 2015, the current director is Dr. Meredith Evans, an Atlanta native who had held various leadership positions in special collections and libraries in institutions such as Washington University in St. Louis and George Washington University.

The library and museum offers free admission to all students 16 and under. They can either go on a docent or self-guided tour. Together the library and The Coca-Cola Foundation have established funding for the library to provide transportation funds for all Georgia schools to use when bringing students to the museum for education activities.

Following her death, Rosalynn Carter laid in repose at the library on November 27, 2023. A year later, Jimmy Carter was also laid in repose at the library from January 4 to 7 before being flown to Washington, D.C. for the state funeral.

== See also ==
- Presidential memorials in the United States
