= Berzelia, Georgia =

Community in the state of Georgia

- Unincorporated community
- Location within Georgia Location within the United States
- Coordinates: 33°24′24″N 82°15′5″W
- Country: United States
- State: Georgia
- County: Columbia
- Elevation: 495 ft (151 m)
- Time zone: UTC-5 (Eastern (EST))
  - Summer (DST): UTC-4 (EDT)
- Area codes: 706 & 762
- GNIS ID: 331141

Berzelia is an unincorporated community in Columbia County in the U.S. state of Georgia. It is located on U.S. Routes 78 and 278, 18 miles (29 km) west-southwest of Downtown Augusta and 3.8 miles (6.1 km) east of Harlem.

== History ==
A post office called Berzelia was established in 1835 and remained in operation until 1933. In 1900, the community had 84 inhabitants.
