= Grayson, Georgia =

- City
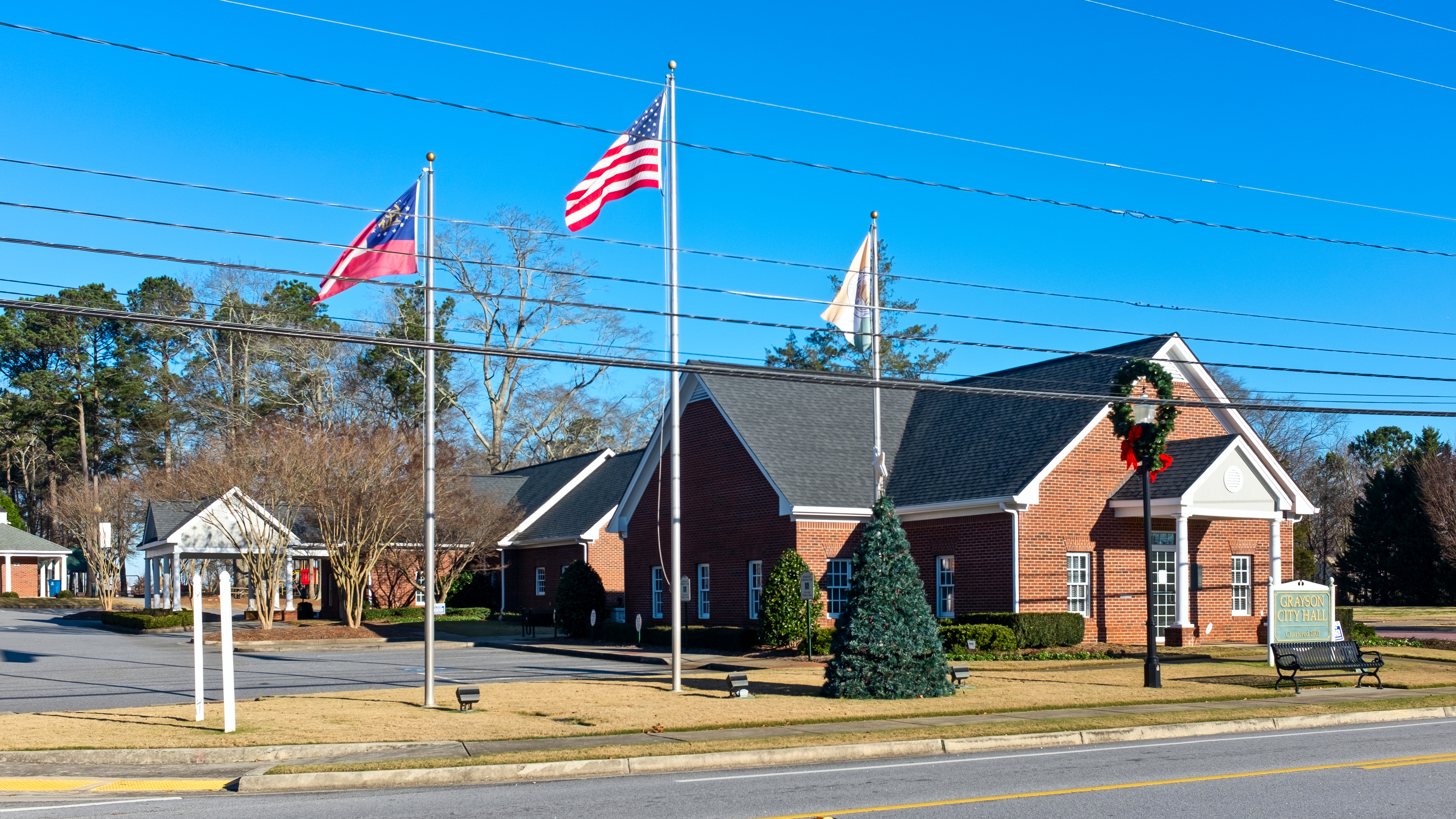
- Grayson City Hall

- Flag Seal Logo
- Motto(s): "Steadfast and True"
- Location in Gwinnett County and the state of Georgia
- Coordinates: 33°53′25″N 83°57′28″W
- Country: United States
- State: Georgia
- County: Gwinnett

Government
  - Mayor: Allison Wilkerson

Area
  - Total: 2.57 sq mi (6.66 km^{2})
  - Land: 2.51 sq mi (6.50 km^{2})
  - Water: 0.062 sq mi (0.16 km^{2})
- Elevation: 1,079 ft (329 m)

Population (2020)
  - Total: 4,730
  - Density: 1,885/sq mi (727.7/km^{2})
- Time zone: UTC-5 (Eastern (EST))
  - Summer (DST): UTC-4 (EDT)
- ZIP code: 30017
- Area code: 770
- FIPS code: 13-34596
- GNIS feature ID: 2403733
- Website: www.cityofgrayson.org

Grayson is a city in Gwinnett County, Georgia, United States. The 2020 estimated population of Grayson, GA is 4740 people. The population was 2,666 at the 2010 census, up from 765 in 2000.

== History ==
The city of Grayson was first called Trip. In 1901, John Ellery Jacobs, the postmaster and civic leader, wrote to the post office department requesting that Trip, Georgia be changed to Berkley, Georgia. On December 6, 1901, the General Assembly of Georgia approved an act to incorporate the town and change the name. Shortly after, Ellery Jacobs was notified that there was already a Berkley, Georgia. He then suggested Graymount (because there was a clear view of Stone Mountain), but it was also taken. He then suggested the name of Grayson, Georgia.

== Geography ==
Grayson is located southeast of the center of Gwinnett County at 33°53′36″N 83°57′20″W (33.893306, -83.955420). SR 20 is the main highway through town, leading north 5 miles (8 km) into Lawrenceville, the county seat, and southeast five miles to Loganville. SR 84 leads southwest five miles to Snellville. According to the United States Census Bureau, the city has a total area of 2.53 square miles (6.55 km^{2}), of which 2.47 square miles (6.40 km^{2}) is land and 0.06 square miles (0.15 km^{2}), or 2.30%, is water.

=== Climate ===
Grayson has a Humid Subtropical Climate (Köppen climate classification Cfa"). Grayson falls under the USDA 7b Plant Hardiness zone.

Climate data for Grayson, Georgia
Month	Jan	Feb	Mar	Apr	May	Jun	Jul	Aug	Sep	Oct	Nov	Dec	Year
Mean daily maximum °F (°C)	51.6 (10.9)	55.5 (13.1)	63.7 (17.6)	71.9 (22.2)	79.1 (26.2)	85.4 (29.7)	88.3 (31.3)	87.5 (30.8)	82.1 (27.8)	73.0 (22.8)	62.6 (17.0)	54.3 (12.4)	71.3 (21.8)
Mean daily minimum °F (°C)	31.7 (−0.2)	34.5 (1.4)	40.5 (4.7)	48.2 (9.0)	57.3 (14.1)	65.3 (18.5)	68.8 (20.4)	68.0 (20.0)	61.9 (16.6)	50.7 (10.4)	39.8 (4.3)	34.7 (1.5)	50.1 (10.1)
Average precipitation inches (mm)	4.88 (124)	4.77 (121)	5.0 (130)	4.16 (106)	3.85 (98)	4.71 (120)	4.84 (123)	4.4 (110)	3.86 (98)	3.55 (90)	4.18 (106)	4.73 (120)	52.93 (1,344)

Grayson suffered a damaging tornado on June 27, 1994, killing a 10-year-old girl. The city has been suffering from exurban growth in eastern Gwinnett County, especially in the late 1990s and through the 2000s.

== Demographics ==
Historical population
Census	Pop.	Note	%±
1910	278		—
1920	322		15.8%
1930	245		−23.9%
1940	228		−6.9%
1950	227		−0.4%
1960	282		24.2%
1970	366		29.8%
1980	464		26.8%
1990	529		14.0%
2000	765		44.6%
2010	2,666		248.5%
2020	4,730		77.4%
2025 (est.)	5,569	▲	17.7%
U.S. Decennial Census; 2025

=== 2020 census ===
As of the 2020 census, Grayson had a population of 4,730. The median age was 42.6 years. 25.0% of residents were under the age of 18 and 18.9% of residents were 65 years of age or older. For every 100 females there were 87.9 males, and for every 100 females age 18 and over there were 81.8 males age 18 and over.

100.0% of residents lived in urban areas, while 0.0% lived in rural areas.

There were 1,514 households in Grayson, of which 41.4% had children under the age of 18 living in them. Of all households, 63.1% were married-couple households, 9.4% were households with a male householder and no spouse or partner present, and 23.4% were households with a female householder and no spouse or partner present. About 16.7% of all households were made up of individuals and 9.4% had someone living alone who was 65 years of age or older. There were 1,049 families residing in the city.

There were 1,569 housing units, of which 3.5% were vacant. The homeowner vacancy rate was 1.5% and the rental vacancy rate was 5.8%.

Grayson racial composition as of 2020
Race	Num.	Perc.
White (non-Hispanic)	1,691	35.75%
Black or African American (non-Hispanic)	1,827	38.63%
Native American	14	0.3%
Asian	576	12.18%
Pacific Islander	3	0.06%
Other/Mixed	223	4.71%
Hispanic or Latino	396	8.37%

== Government ==
=== Local government ===
The city government of Grayson consists of a mayor and four council members.

The current mayor and council members are:

- Mayor: Allison Wilkerson
- Council members: Bob Foreman, Gene Ussery, James Gillespie, and Linda Jenkins.

== Arts and culture ==
Modeled after Snellville Days in nearby Snellville, Grayson Day Festival, held annually on a Saturday at the end of April, features a parade down Main Street, food vendors, crafts, and live music. The city and local businesses sponsor the event, which takes place mostly in the centrally located Grayson City Park. The football team, marching band, and cheerleaders from Grayson High School, as well as other local organizations, politicians, and groups make the parade a favorite tradition among residents.

== Education ==
The county operates under Gwinnett County Public Schools and Gwinnett County Public Library, with GCPS operating numerous schools within the Grayson cluster, which are

- Grayson High School
  - Bay Creek Middle School
    - Grayson Elementary School
    - Trip Elementary School
  - Couch Middle School
    - Pharr Elementary School
    - Starling Elementary School

== Notable people ==
- Joyce Chandler - Educator and politician. Member of Georgia House of Representatives. Resident of Grayson.
- Austin Meadows - Baseball player. Grew up in Grayson.
- Parker Meadows - Baseball player. Grew up in Grayson.
- Nikki Merritt - Politician. Member of the Georgia State Senate.Resident of Grayson.
- Chuck Robbins - chairman and chief executive officer (CEO) of Cisco Systems. Born in Grayson.
- Robert Nkemdiche - NFL Football player. Grew up and started his career in Grayson, at Grayson High School in 2015.

== In popular culture ==
- Grayson was featured in Outbreak, authored by Robin Cook, which was published in 1987.
