= Stone Mountain Freeway =

Highway in Georgia

Stone Mountain Freeway
- Bill Evans Highway

Route information
- Maintained by GDOT
- Length: 10.1 mi (16.3 km)
- Existed: 1970–present
- Component highways: US 78 from the Scottdale–North Decatur line to northeast of Stone Mountain Park; SR 410 from the Scottdale–North Decatur line to north of Stone Mountain Park; SR 10 from north of Stone Mountain to northeast of Stone Mountain Park

Major junctions
- West end: US 29 / US 78 / SR 8 on the Scottdale–North Decatur line
- I-285 on the Scottdale–Clarkston city line SR 8 Conn. in Tucker SR 10 north of Stone Mountain
- East end: US 78 / SR 10 northeast of Stone Mountain Park

Location
- Country: United States
- State: Georgia
- Counties: DeKalb, Gwinnett

Highway system
- United States Numbered Highway System; List; Special; Divided; Georgia State Highway System; Interstate; US; State; Special
← SR 409	SR 410	→ US 411

Stone Mountain Freeway is a freeway in the north-central part of the U.S. state of Georgia. It connects Interstate 285 (I-285) east of Atlanta, with the suburbs of Stone Mountain and Snellville before transitioning into an arterial road that continues to Athens. The freeway is signed as U.S. Route 78 (US 78) for its entire length, with the western half signed as State Route 410 (SR 410), and the eastern half also being signed as SR 10. It begins at the US 29/US 78 split northeast of Decatur, and continues east through eastern DeKalb and southern Gwinnett counties. The portion of Stone Mountain Freeway from I-285 to the Dekalb/Gwinnett county line is alternatively designated as Bill Evans Highway.

== Route description ==
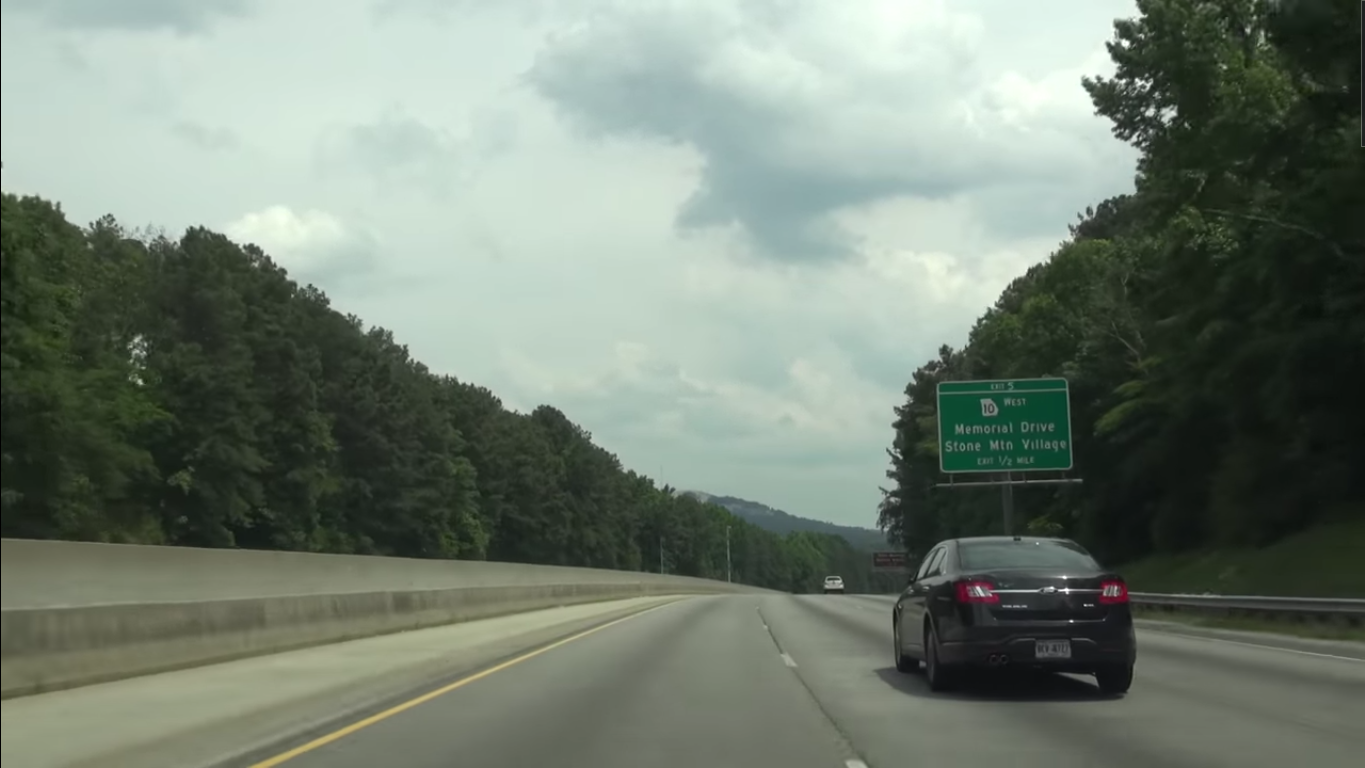
Eastbound Stone Mountain Freeway at Exit 5.

Stone Mountain Freeway begins at an interchange with US 29/SR 8 (Lawrenceville Highway) on the Scottdale–North Decatur city line, within DeKalb County. There is no access to US 29/SR 8 north from Stone Mountain Freeway or to Stone Mountain Freeway from US 29/SR 8 south. Both can only be accessed via North Druid Hills Road. Southwest of this interchange, US 29/US 78/SR 8 head toward Decatur. Stone Mountain Freeway travels to the northeast, concurrent with US 78 and SR 410. The concurrency has a partial interchange with Valley Brook Road and North Druid Hills Road. Just before leaving Scottdale is an interchange with Interstate 285 (I-285). Part of this interchange is within the city limits of Clarkston. The two highways travel to the north of Clarkston and enter Tucker. They have an interchange with Brockett Road and Cooledge Road, and then one more with the eastern terminus of SR 8 Conn. (Mountain Industrial Boulevard). After leaving Tucker, they have an interchange with SR 10 (Memorial Drive). At this interchange, SR 410 meets its eastern terminus, and SR 10 begins a concurrency with US 78 and Stone Mountain Freeway. They have an interchange with the former eastern terminus of SR 236 since 2024 (Hugh Howell Road), which travels back towards Tucker. A little bit later is an access road to Stone Mountain Park's main entrance. Right after the park, the highways enter Gwinnett County and have a partial interchange with Park Place Boulevard and Rockbridge Road. Just to the east of this interchange, the freeway ends and US 78/SR 10 continue to the east, locally known as Stone Mountain Highway.

West of Exit 1, the speed limit is 55 miles per hour (89 km/h). East of the interchange with North Druid Hills Road, the limit rises to 65 miles per hour (105 km/h). Unlike Georgia's Interstate highways, the highway still has actual sequential exit numbers, rather than being mileage-based. There is no exit 6, which makes the exit numbering non-sequential; the former Exit 6 was the back entrance to Stone Mountain Park via Old Hugh Howell Road, previously open for major events only.

All of Stone Mountain Freeway is included as part of the National Highway System, a system of roadways important to the nation's economy, defense, and mobility.

== History ==
Stone Mountain Freeway was under construction in 1967 along the same alignment as it travels today. By 1970, the highway was completed.

=== Controversy ===
The Stone Mountain Freeway shares state route number 10 with Freedom Parkway, a 2-mile-long (3.2 km) road in central Atlanta that connects with the Interstate Highway System at a major interchange on I-75/I-85 (the Downtown Connector). As that designation suggests, state officials originally intended the Stone Mountain Freeway to continue west, through Decatur, Druid Hills, and Candler Park, to downtown Atlanta. In pursuit of those plans, in 1969, the GDOT purchased an X-shaped swath of land designed to carry two roads: I-485, traveling from west to east, and another freeway connecting what are now SR 400 to the north and I-675 to the south.

Neighborhood groups and local preservationists worked together to block road construction of the highways. After 20 years of litigation and political maneuvering, community groups and state and local officials in 1991 compromised and set much of the state-purchased right-of-way aside as parkland, later named Freedom Park. The land proposed as the interchange of the two cancelled highways, by then, had become the site of the Carter Center.

Freedom Parkway – the last vestige of the planned downtown link of the Stone Mountain Freeway – opened in 1994.

== Exit list ==
County	Location	mi	km	Exit	Destinations	Notes
DeKalb	Scottdale–North Decatur line	0.0	0.0		US 29 south / US 78 west / SR 8 west (Lawrenceville Highway) / SR 410 begins – Decatur, Atlanta	Western end of US 78 and SR 410 concurrencies; western terminus of SR 410 and Stone Mountain Freeway; no access to or from US 29 north / SR 8 east
DeKalb	Scottdale	0.5	0.80	1	Valley Brook Road / North Druid Hills Road	Westbound exit and eastbound entrance
DeKalb	Scottdale–Clarkston line	1.0	1.6	2	I-285 (Atlanta Bypass / SR 407) – Greenville, Chattanooga, Augusta, Macon	I-285 exit 39
DeKalb	Tucker	2.5	4.0	3	Brockett Road / Cooledge Road	
DeKalb	Tucker	4.6	7.4	4	Mountain Industrial Boulevard (SR 8 Conn. west) – Tucker	Eastern terminus of SR 8 Conn.
DeKalb		6.8	10.9	5	SR 10 west (Memorial Drive) / SR 410 ends – Stone Mountain	Western end of SR 10 concurrency; eastern end of SR 410 concurrency; eastern terminus of SR 410
DeKalb		8.2	13.2	7	Hugh Howell Road – Tucker	Former eastern terminus of SR 236 since 2024
DeKalb		9.0	14.5	8	Stone Mountain Park main entrance	
Gwinnett	Mountain Park	10.1	16.3	9	Park Place Boulevard / Rockbridge Road	
Gwinnett	Mountain Park	10.1	16.3		US 78 east / SR 10 east (Stone Mountain Highway) – Snellville, Athens	Eastern end of US 78 and SR 10 concurrencies; eastern terminus of Stone Mountain Freeway; continuation east
1.000 mi = 1.609 km; 1.000 km = 0.621 mi: Concurrency terminus; Incomplete access
