= Boneville, Georgia =

- Unincorporated community
- Location within Georgia Location within the United States
- Coordinates: 33°26′00″N 82°26′19″W
- Country: United States
- State: Georgia
- County: McDuffie
- Elevation: 472 ft (144 m)
- Time zone: UTC-5 (Eastern (EST))
  - Summer (DST): UTC-4 (EDT)
- ZIP code: 30806
- Area codes: 706 & 762
- GNIS feature ID: 354810

Boneville is an unincorporated community in McDuffie County, Georgia, United States. The community is located along U.S. Routes 78 and 278, 4.6 miles (7.4 km) east-southeast of Thomson. Boneville has a post office with ZIP code 30806, which opened on September 15, 1884.
