= Hart Creek (Georgia) =

Stream in Georgia, United States

Physical characteristics
- Source
  - coordinates: 33.4781921°N 82.7248585°W
- Mouth
  - coordinates: 33.6206870°N 82.5026293°W

Hart Creek is a stream in the U.S. state of Georgia.

Hart Creek was named after a pioneer settler. A variant name is Harts Creek.
