= Tignall, Georgia =

- Town
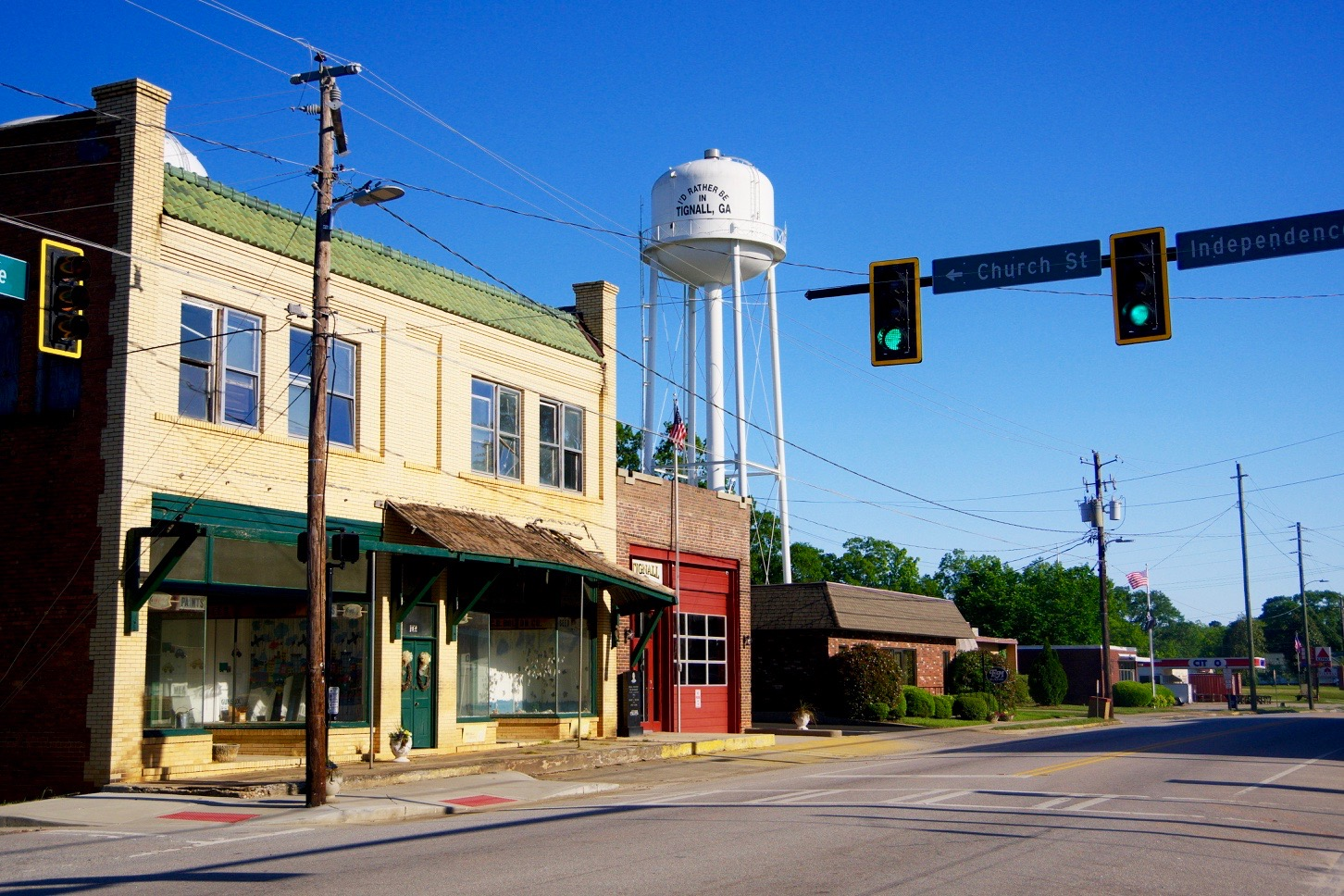
- Hulin Avenue (SR 17)
- Nickname: Little Atlanta,
- Motto: "I'd rather be in Tignall"
- Location in Wilkes County and the state of Georgia
- Coordinates: 33°52′1″N 82°44′28″W
- Country: United States
- State: Georgia
- County: Wilkes

Area
  - Total: 2.79 sq mi (7.23 km^{2})
  - Land: 2.75 sq mi (7.13 km^{2})
  - Water: 0.039 sq mi (0.10 km^{2})
- Elevation: 627 ft (191 m)

Population (2020)
  - Total: 485
  - Density: 176.1/sq mi (67.99/km^{2})
- Time zone: UTC-5 (Eastern (EST))
  - Summer (DST): UTC-4 (EDT)
- ZIP code: 30668
- Area code: 706
- FIPS code: 13-76532
- GNIS feature ID: 0356591
- Website: https://tignallgeorgia.com/

Tignall is a town in Wilkes County, Georgia, United States. The population was 485 in 2020.

== History ==
The Georgia General Assembly incorporated Tignall as a town in 1907. It was named for Tignall Livingston Moss, a lieutenant in the Confederate army who was killed in battle in 1862.

== Geography ==
Tignall is located at 33°52′1″N 82°44′28″W (33.866861, -82.741195). The town lies along Georgia State Route 17 south of Elberton and north of Washington, and a few miles west of the Georgia-South Carolina state line. According to the United States Census Bureau, the town has a total area of 2.9 square miles (7.5 km^{2}), all land.

== Demographics ==
Historical population
Census	Pop.	Note	%±
1910	320		—
1920	653		104.1%
1930	505		−22.7%
1940	567		12.3%
1950	502		−11.5%
1960	556		10.8%
1970	756		36.0%
1980	733		−3.0%
1990	711		−3.0%
2000	653		−8.2%
2010	546		−16.4%
2020	485		−11.2%
U.S. Decennial Census

As of the census of 2010, there were 615 people, 279 households, and 179 families residing in the town. By 2020, its population was 485.

== Notable person ==
- James E. Boyd, scientist and educator

== Region ==
- Central Savannah River Area

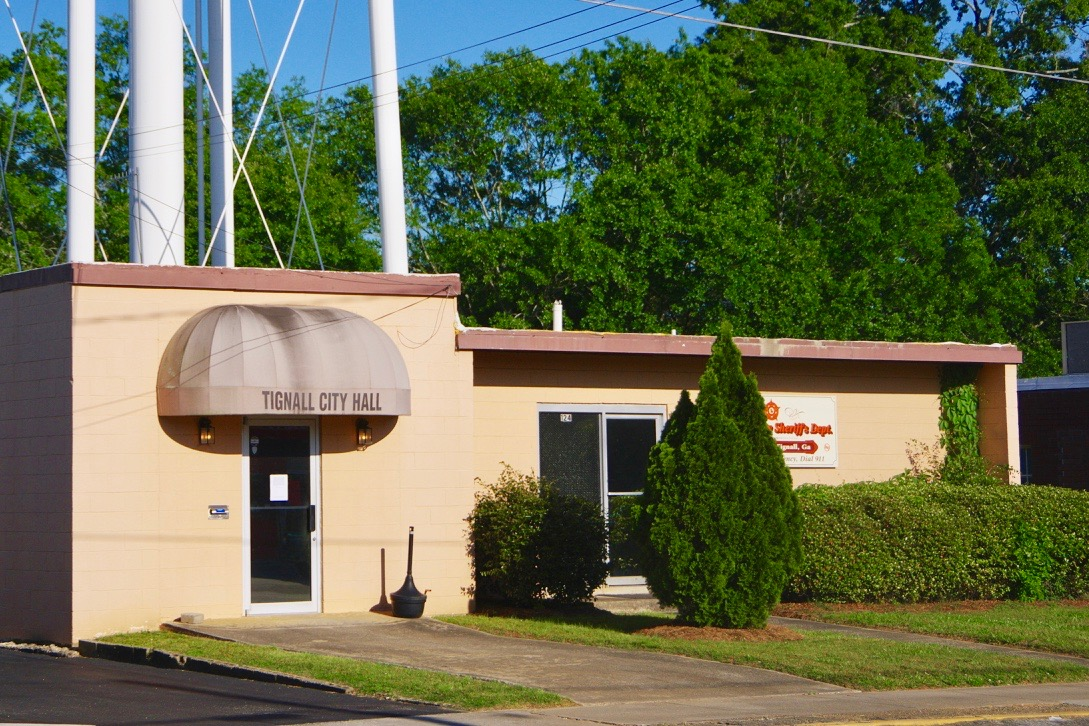
City hall
