= Kettle Creek Battlefield =

- U.S. National Register of Historic Places
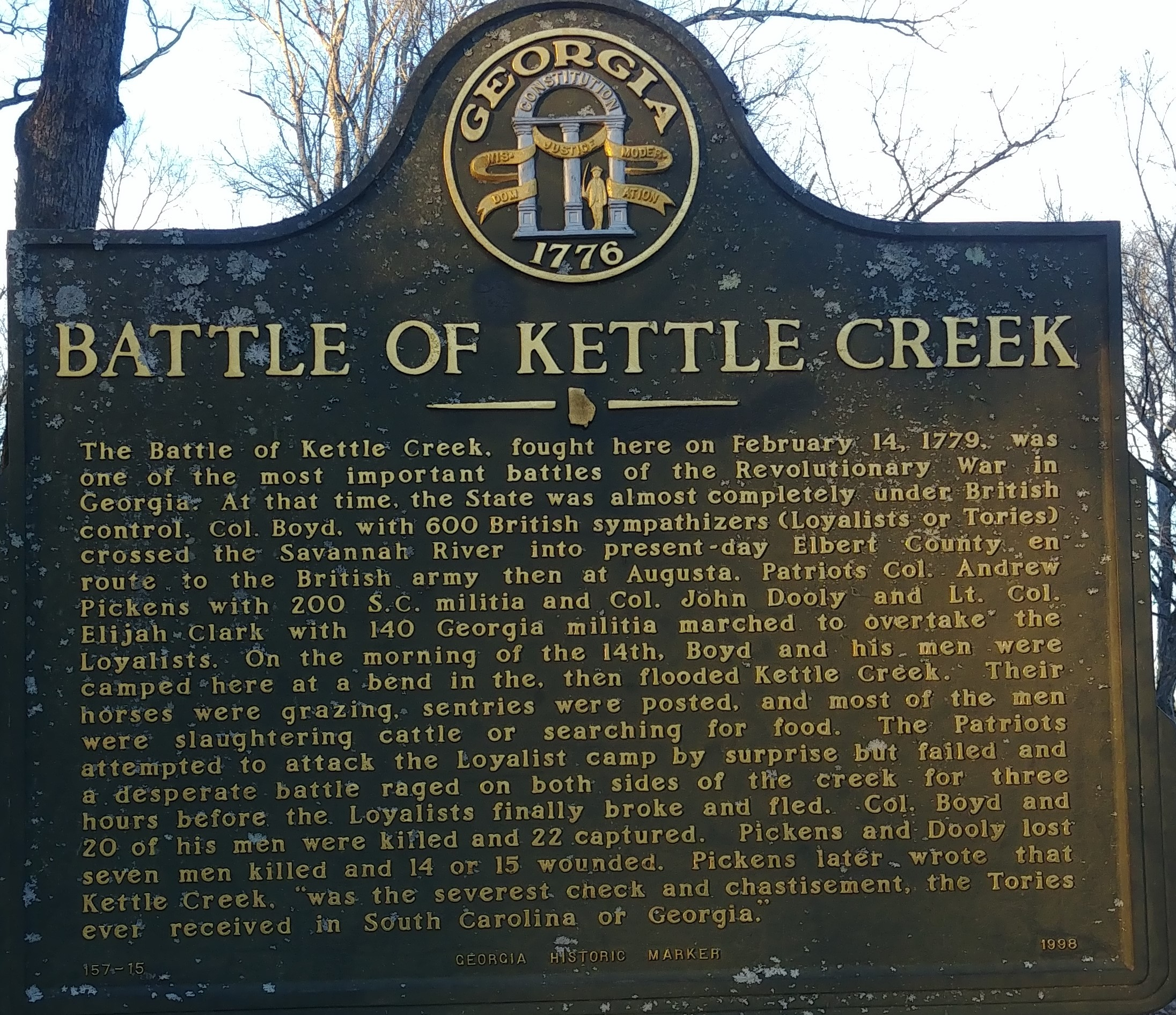
- Kettle Creek Battlefield site and historical marker

- Location within Georgia Location within the United States
- Nearest city: Washington, Georgia
- Coordinates: 33°41′26″N 82°53′11″W
- Area: 40 acres (16 ha)
- NRHP reference No.: 75000617
- Added to NRHP: June 26, 1975

Kettle Creek Battlefield is a 256-acre (104 ha) historic site outside Washington, Georgia in Wilkes County, Georgia, at the location of the Battle of Kettle Creek, in 1779, in the American Revolutionary War. It was added to the National Register of Historic Places on June 26, 1975. In January 2021 the Kettle Creek Battlefield became affiliated with the National Park Service. It is located nine miles (14 km) southwest of Washington off Courtground Road.

The NRHP-listed area encircles "War Hill", a 500 feet (150 m) high hill, which has the Kettle Creek Monument erected upon it, by the War Department in 1930. There are also historical markers placed by the Georgia Historical Commission. In 1900 the Daughters of the American Revolution purchased 12 acres. The Kettle Creek Battlefield Association acquired 60 acres in 2013. In 2018 the American Battlefield Trust and its partners have acquired and preserved 180 acres of the Kettle Creek Battlefield through mid-2018.

== See also ==
- National Register of Historic Places listings in Wilkes County, Georgia
