= Holly Court =

Historic house in Georgia, United States

- U.S. National Register of Historic Places
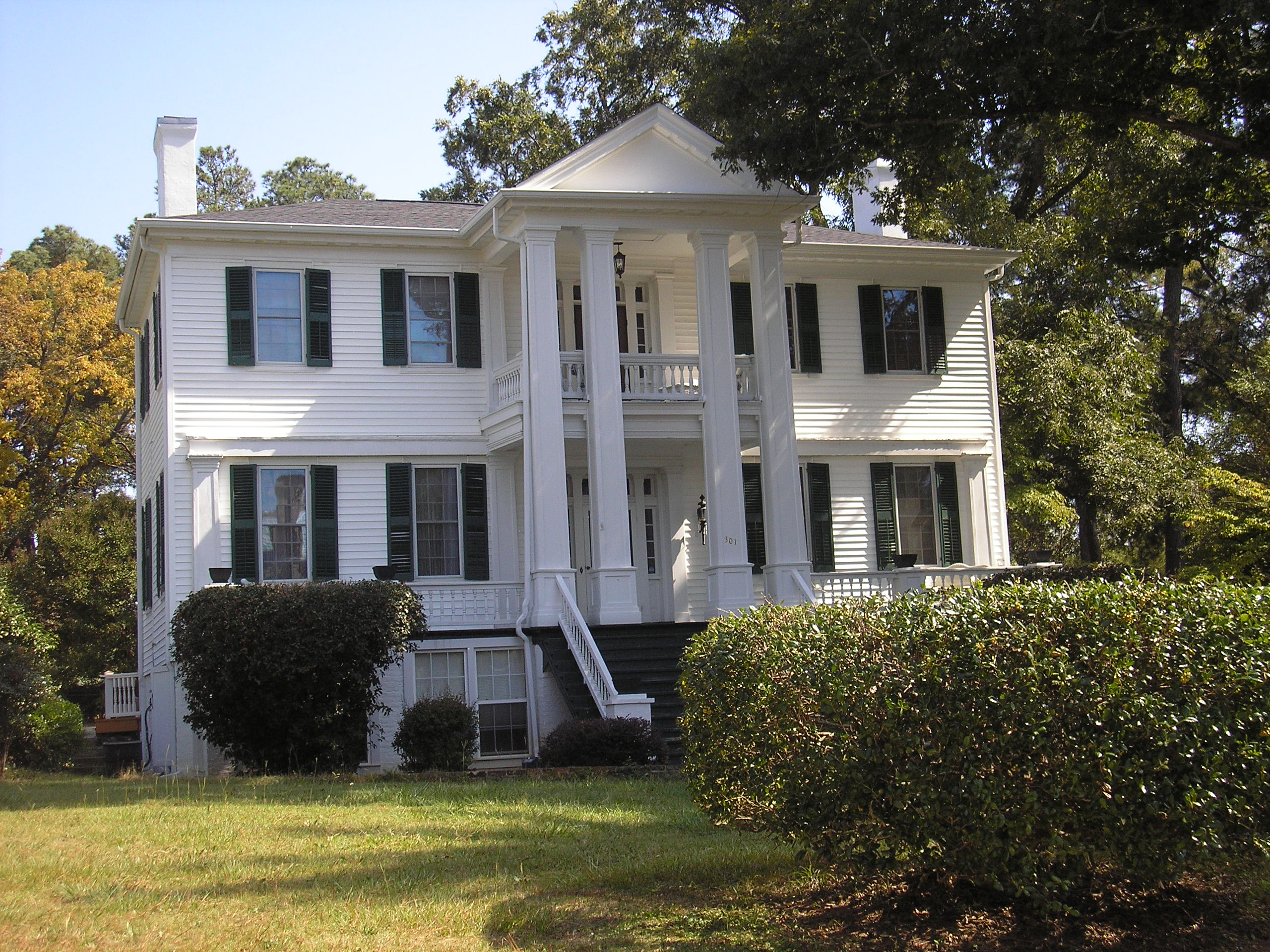

- Location within Georgia
- Location: 301 S. Alexander St., Washington, Georgia
- Coordinates: 33°44′0″N 82°44′12″W
- Area: 1.1 acres (0.45 ha)
- Built: 1833
- Architectural style: Federal
- NRHP reference No.: 72000406
- Added to NRHP: April 11, 1972

Holly Court, also known as the Ficklen-Lyndon-Johnson House, and now operated as Holly Court Inn Bed & Breakfast, is a historic Neoclassical architecture residence converted into a bed & breakfast in Washington, Georgia. It was added to the National Register of Historic Places.

It was the "last refuge" of Varina Davis, wife of Confederate States of America president Jefferson Davis, before his capture, at the end of the American Civil War.

It is a two-story white clapboard building created in about 1840 when two plain-style Federal period houses were joined and a monumental entrance portico was added. The portico has two pairs of square Tuscan columns, and is pedimented.

== See also ==
- National Register of Historic Places listings in Wilkes County, Georgia
