= Campbell-Jordan House =

Historic house in Georgia, United States

- U.S. National Register of Historic Places
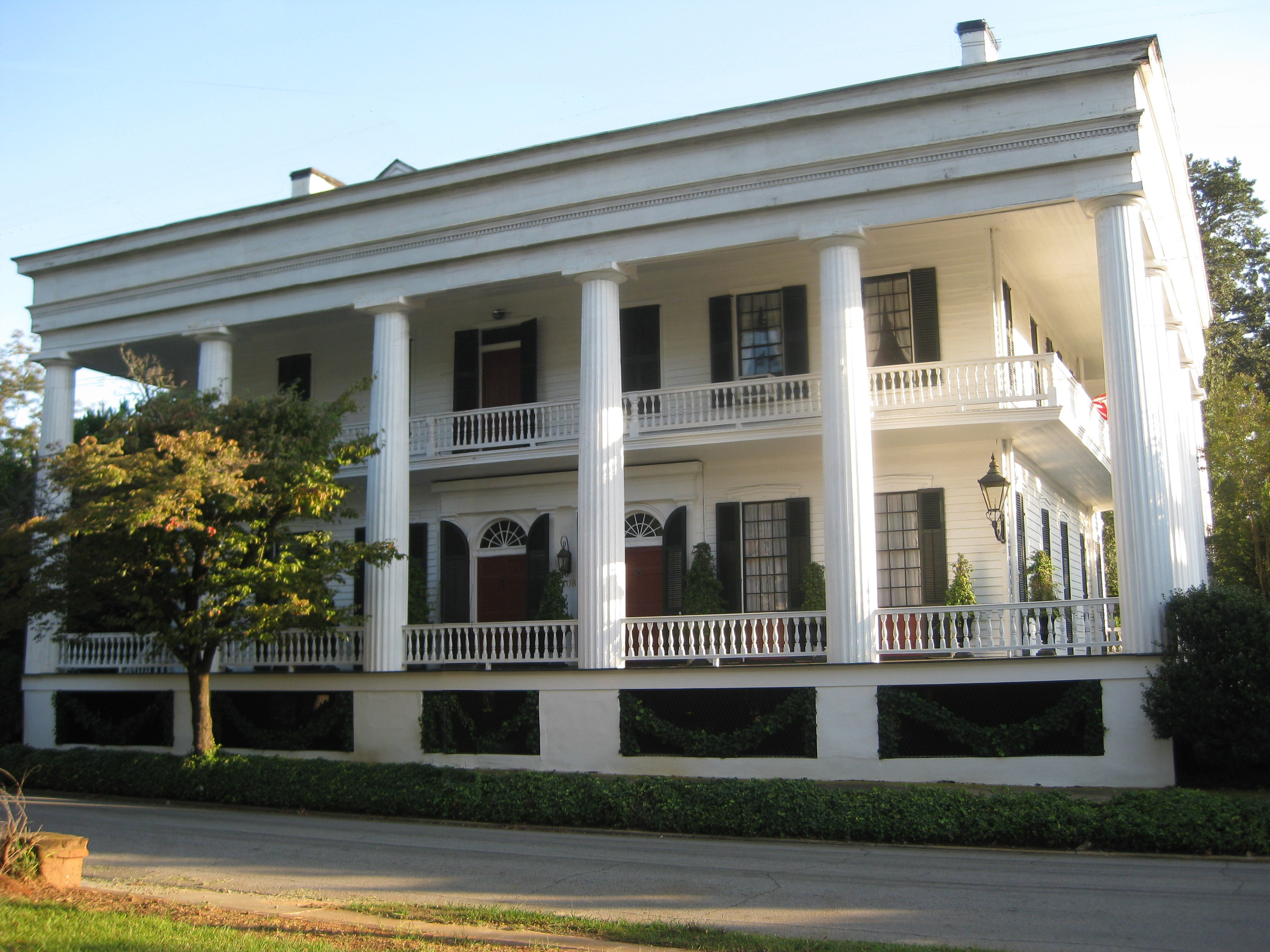

- Location within Georgia Location within the United States
- Location: 208 Liberty St., Washington, Georgia
- Coordinates: 33.73571°N 82.73728°W
- Area: less than one acre
- Built: 1841
- Architectural style: Classical Revival, Greek Revival, Federal
- NRHP reference No.: 71000288
- Added to NRHP: July 14, 1971

Campbell-Jordan House, also known as the Campbell-Jordan-Lindsey-Farnell House, is a historic residence situated in Washington, Georgia. It was added to the National Register of Historic Places on July 14, 1971. It is located at 208 Liberty Street.

The Federal architecture-style home was built in 1787 and underwent a Greek Revival architecture-style makeover in 1841, including the addition of large columns. The original cottage was built by William Stith after 1787 and was bought in 1807, by Duncan Campbell who enlarged it. The western part of the structure was likely constructed by Judge Albert Gallatin Semmes. In 1841, Aaron A. Cleveland added the colonnade. The home was the residence of U.S. Supreme Court Justice and C.S.A. Assistant Secretary of War, John Archibald Campbell.

== See also ==
- National Register of Historic Places listings in Wilkes County, Georgia
