= National Register of Historic Places listings in Wilkes County, Georgia =

Map showing Wilkes County in Georgia.

This is a list of properties and districts in Wilkes County, Georgia that are listed on the National Register of Historic Places (NRHP).

This National Park Service list is complete through NPS recent listings posted October 16, 2026.

== Current listings ==
	Name on the Register	Image	Date listed	Location	City or town	Description
1	Anderson House	Anderson House	September 29, 1976 (#76000657)	GA 44; 33°52′05″N 82°39′10″W	Danburg	
2	Arnold-Callaway Plantation	Arnold-Callaway Plantation	April 11, 1972 (#72000402)	NW of Washington on U.S. 78; 33°46′27″N 82°48′46″W	Washington	Also known as the Callaway Plantation.
3	Campbell-Jordan House	Campbell-Jordan House	July 14, 1971 (#71000288)	208 Liberty St. 33°44′09″N 82°44′14″W	Washington	
4	The Cedars	The Cedars	April 11, 1972 (#72000403)	210 Sims St. 33°44′29″N 82°44′19″W	Washington	
5	Cherry Grove Baptist Church Schoolhouse	Cherry Grove Baptist Church Schoolhouse	June 23, 2020 (#100005300)	1878 Danburg Rd. 33°46′04″N 82°41′55″W	Washington vicinity	
6	James and Cunningham Daniel House	James and Cunningham Daniel House	November 24, 1980 (#80001266)	S of Rayle on Bartram Trace Rd. 33°41′00″N 82°54′29″W	Rayle	
7	East Robert Toombs Historic District	East Robert Toombs Historic District	April 11, 1972 (#72000404)	East Robert Toombs Ave. between Alexander Ave. and Grove St. 33°44′12″N 82°44′12″W	Washington	Incorporated into Washington Historic District.
8	Fitzpatrick Hotel	Fitzpatrick Hotel	December 17, 1982 (#82000147)	18 W. Public Square; 33°44′14″N 82°44′24″W	Washington	
9	Gartrell Family House		June 14, 2002 (#02000629)	854 Boyd Rd. 33°55′28″N 82°46′24″W	Tignall	
10	Gilbert-Alexander House	Gilbert-Alexander House	April 11, 1972 (#72000405)	116 Alexander Dr. 33°44′28″N 82°44′14″W	Washington	
11	Thomas M. Gilmer House		November 2, 1977 (#77001540)	5 miles (8.0 km) W of Washington on U.S. 78; 33°58′38″N 82°50′07″W	Washington	
12	Holly Court	Holly Court	April 11, 1972 (#72000406)	301 S. Alexander St. 33°44′00″N 82°44′12″W	Washington	
13	Kettle Creek Battlefield	Kettle Creek Battlefield	June 26, 1975 (#75000617)	9 miles (14 km) SW of Washington off Tyrone Rd. 33°41′26″N 82°53′11″W	Washington	
14	Mary Willis Library	Mary Willis Library	April 11, 1972 (#72000407)	204 E. Liberty (at S. Jefferson St.); 33°44′07″N 82°44′17″W	Washington	
15	New Ford Baptist Church and Cemetery		July 8, 2026 (#100012159)	402 Bradford Road; 33°52′31″N 82°39′24″W	Tignall	
16	North Washington District		March 7, 1973 (#73000649)	Bounded by Jefferson and Court Sts., Poplar Dr., and U.S. 78; 33°44′40″N 82°44′22″W	Washington	Incorporated into Washington Historic District.
17	Old Jail	Old Jail	June 5, 1974 (#74000706)	103 Court St. 33°44′20″N 82°44′28″W	Washington	
18	Peacewood		April 11, 1972 (#72000408)	120 Tignall Rd. 33°45′15″N 82°44′01″W	Washington	
19	Pharr-Callaway-Sethness House	Pharr-Callaway-Sethness House	March 26, 1976 (#76000659)	N of Tignall on GA 2193; 33°56′14″N 82°44′12″W	Tignall	The house seems to be gone as of 2020.
20	Poplar Corner	Poplar Corner	April 11, 1972 (#72000409)	210 W. Liberty St. 33°44′09″N 82°44′33″W	Washington	
21	Robert Shand Smith House	Robert Shand Smith House	November 7, 2002 (#02001294)	902 S. Spring St. 33°43′34″N 82°44′31″W	Washington	
22	Robert Toombs House	Robert Toombs House	April 11, 1972 (#72000410)	216 E. Robert Toombs Ave. 33°44′10″N 82°44′02″W	Washington	A National Historic Landmark and a Georgia state historic site
23	Tupper-Barnett House	Tupper-Barnett House	April 11, 1972 (#72000411)	101 W. Robert Toombs Ave. 33°44′14″N 82°44′28″W	Washington	National Historic Landmark
24	Washington Commercial Historic District	Washington Commercial Historic District	March 6, 1986 (#86000412)	Roughly bounded by Court St., Jefferson St., Robert Toombs Ave., and Allison St. 33°44′14″N 82°44′22″W	Washington	Incorporated into Washington Historic District.
25	Washington Historic District		December 6, 2004 (#04001319)	Centered on West Robert Toombs Ave. and N. Alexander St. 33°44′07″N 82°44′34″W	Washington	
26	Washington Presbyterian Church	Washington Presbyterian Church	April 11, 1972 (#72000412)	206 E. Robert Toombs Ave. 33°44′08″N 82°44′10″W	Washington	
27	Washington-Wilkes Historical Museum	Washington-Wilkes Historical Museum	May 13, 1970 (#70000227)	308 E. Robert Toombs Ave. 33°44′07″N 82°44′03″W	Washington	
28	West Robert Toombs District		March 1, 1973 (#73000650)	W. Robert Toombs Ave. between Allison St. and Rte. 44 and Lexington Ave. 33°44′10″N 82°44′50″W	Washington	Incorporated into Washington Historic District.
29	Wilkes County Courthouse	Wilkes County Courthouse	September 18, 1980 (#80001267)	Court St. 33°44′17″N 82°44′22″W	Washington	
30	Willis-Sale-Stennett House	Willis-Sale-Stennett House	October 14, 1976 (#76000658)	N of Danburg off GA 79 on SR 1445 (Delhi Road); 33°55′20″N 82°39′04″W	Danburg	
