= Callaway Plantation =

- Arnold-Callaway Plantation
- U.S. National Register of Historic Places
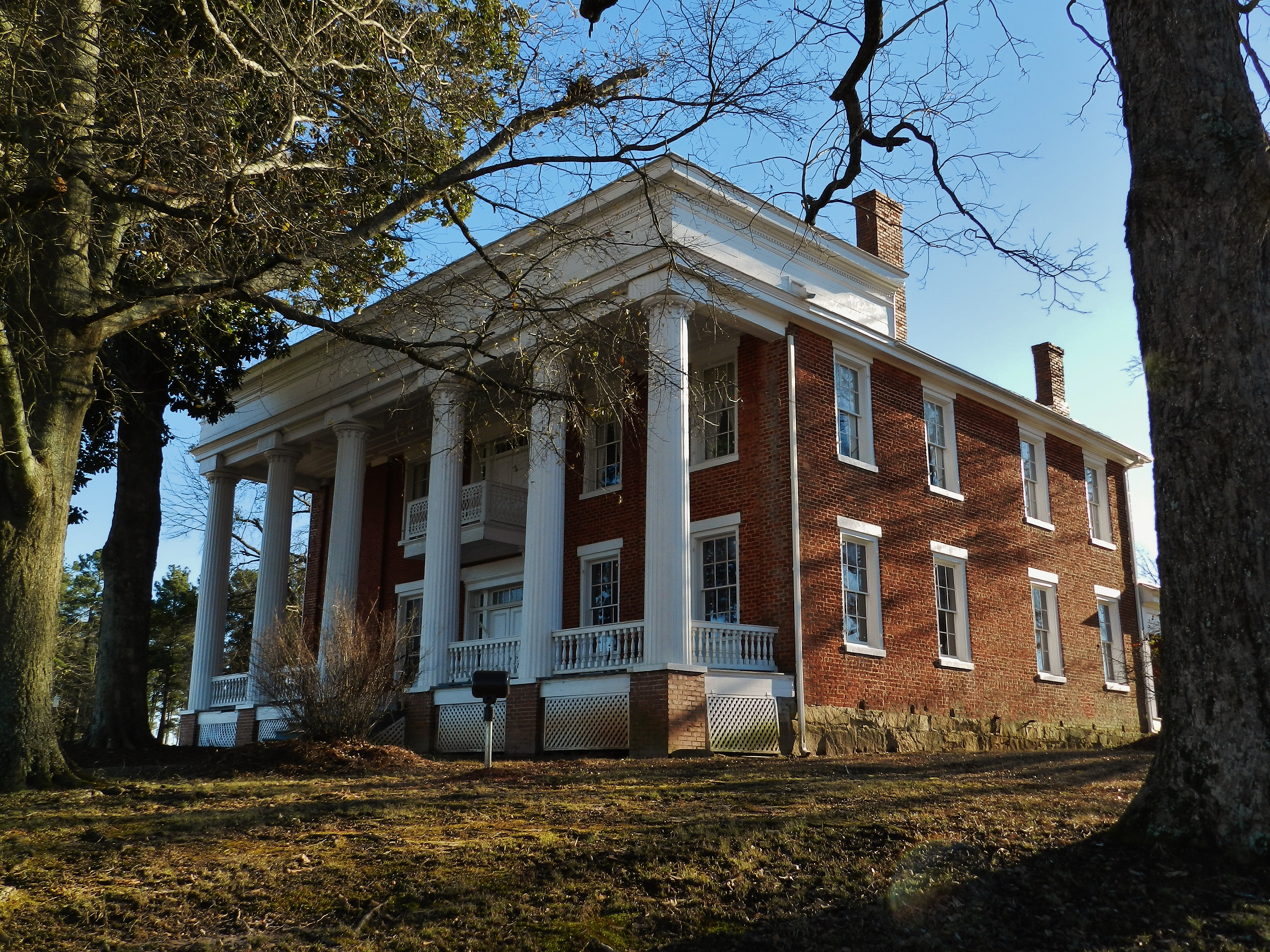

- Location within Georgia Location within the United States
- Location: NW of Washington on U.S. 78, Georgia, U.S.
- Coordinates: 33.774167°N 82.812778°W
- Architectural style: Greek Revival
- NRHP reference No.: 72000402
- Added to NRHP: April 11, 1972

The Callaway Plantation, also known as the Arnold-Callaway Plantation, is a set of historical buildings, and an open-air museum located in Washington, Georgia. The site was formerly a working cotton plantation with enslaved African Americans. The site was owned by the Callaway family between 1785 until 1977; however, the family still owns a considerable amount of acreage surrounding the Callaway Plantation. When The plantation was active, it was large in size and owned several hundred slaves.

The museum site is a 56-acre (230,000 m^{2}) area containing the main houses that was donated by the family to the city of Washington in 1977. Additional buildings were moved to the site to represent typical plantation buildings. The museum is operated by the city of Washington, Georgia. The site is considered notable and historical by the National Register of Historic Places (NRHP) because the main manor house it is a rare example of the Greek Revival architecture used as a plantation house, and is an example of classicism in Reconstruction-era Georgia. It has been on the National Register of Historic Places list since April 11, 1972.

== Callaway family history ==
The Callaway family of Georgia descends from Peter Callaway (1640–1715) an immigrant who came to the United States from England. Fuller Earle Callaway, and Cason Jewell Callaway (1894–1961) were part of this same family; and their branch of the family had migrated to west Georgia (to the cities of Columbus and LaGrange).

=== 1700s ===
In 1783, Thomas Edward Callaway and his family moved to the state of Georgia from Halifax County, Virginia (by way of North Carolina). In 1785, John Callaway (1746–1821), one of the four sons of Thomas Edward Callaway, was granted 200 acres of land by the state of Georgia, located 9 miles West from Washington, Georgia. John Callaway built a one room log cabin on the property (which is no longer standing, but was located near the Callaway family cemetery). John Callaway and his son Enoch Callaway held many enslaved African Americans, and the plantation grew cotton for export. The enslaved people lived in log cabins near the homestead.

=== 1800s ===
When John Callaway died in 1821, he bequeathed 25 enslaved African Americans to his children and his body was buried in the Callaway family cemetery. The cemetery had existed prior to John's burial, filled with former neighbors in graves that were unmarked or poorly marked with stones. John's son Enoch Callaway died in 1859, and passed on a remaining 8 enslaved African Americans in his will. When slaves died they were buried in a separate burial ground only for African American (which was abandoned in 1910, and is no longer standing).

Jobe Callaway, married and moved to Chambers County, Alabama but later returned to Callaway Plantation. Jobe Callaway died at the plantation and left in his will to his son Jacob, "558 acres, where he lives". Jacob Callaway (1760–1855) built his homestead in 1817, most of his wealth came before the American Civil War, as he helped raised cotton and sold it to England.

Jacob Callaway's son Parker inherited 100 acres near the "Fishing Creek" by 1855, and he started amassing and buying tracts of land nearby from his relatives, and by the time he had died he had 3060+ acres. Jacob Callaway's money from the last shipment of cotton accrued interest in the Bank of England, which he could not access until after the Civil War ended in 1865 (after Jacob's death). The Callaway family made a large profit from the interest and was able to take that money to fund the building of the brick manor house by 1869 under his grandson Aristide's leadership.

=== 1900s ===
Parker Callaway's son Aristides sold the majority of the 3060+ acres property to W. R. Callaway, Enoch Jones, and Lucy A. Jones. When Aristides Callaway died, he left 400+ acres to two of his children. Aristides granddaughter, Katie Mae Arnold Hardin (1888–1977) donated her portion of the Callaway property to the city of Washington, Georgia.

== Architecture ==
There are many structures on the property, however the notable buildings include the Parker Callaway homestead (built c. 1817), and Aristides Callaway's Greek Revival brick plantation manor house (built c. 1869; and nicknamed by NRHP as "the brickhouse"). Other structures include the Jacob Callaway's Grey House (built 1790), a log cabin (c. 1785), a one-room schoolhouse (built 1891), the Dally Slave Cabin (built 1840), and a general store (built 1930), all moved to the site from elsewhere in Georgia in order to create the museum. There is also a corn crib, a house for making bricks, and a smoke house.

The main manor house (built by Aristides Callaway) was built in a "monumental scale", during the Reconstruction-era after the American Civil War, which indicates the family had much wealth. Bricks were not a common material during that time period or in that location.

The Grey House was built in 1790 by Jacob Callaway and still stands on the site, a two-story house in Federal Plain style architecture. The Grey House features period furnishings and decorations.

== Museum ==
The site is currently located across from the Washington-Wilkes airport, but otherwise appears from photographs to represent a rural plantation. A small admission fee is charged. Tourist items are sold at the general store, which also serves as the information center. The buildings feature furniture, tools, and other items characteristic of the old times.

Callaway Plantation buildings

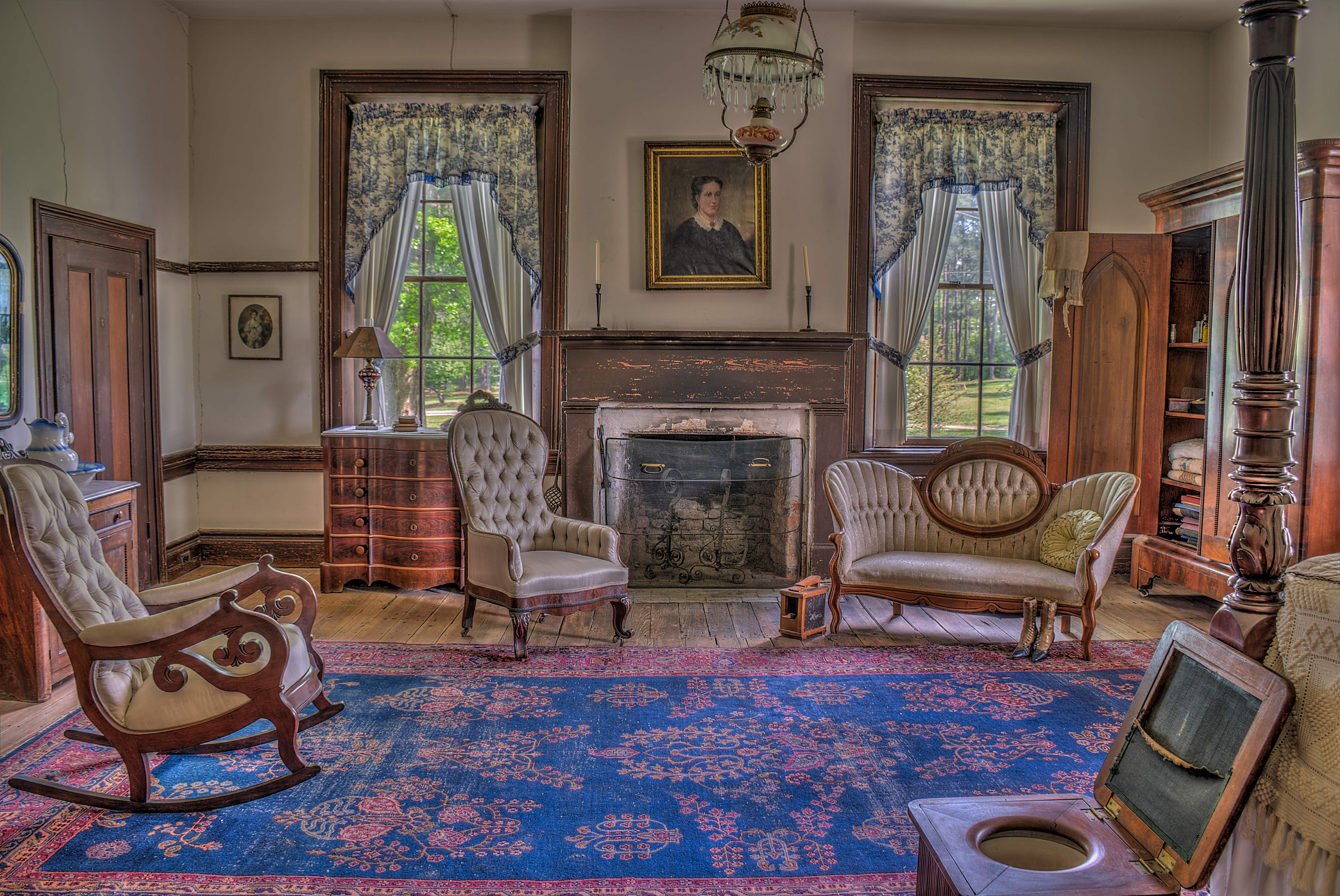
Brick manor house interior, c. 1869

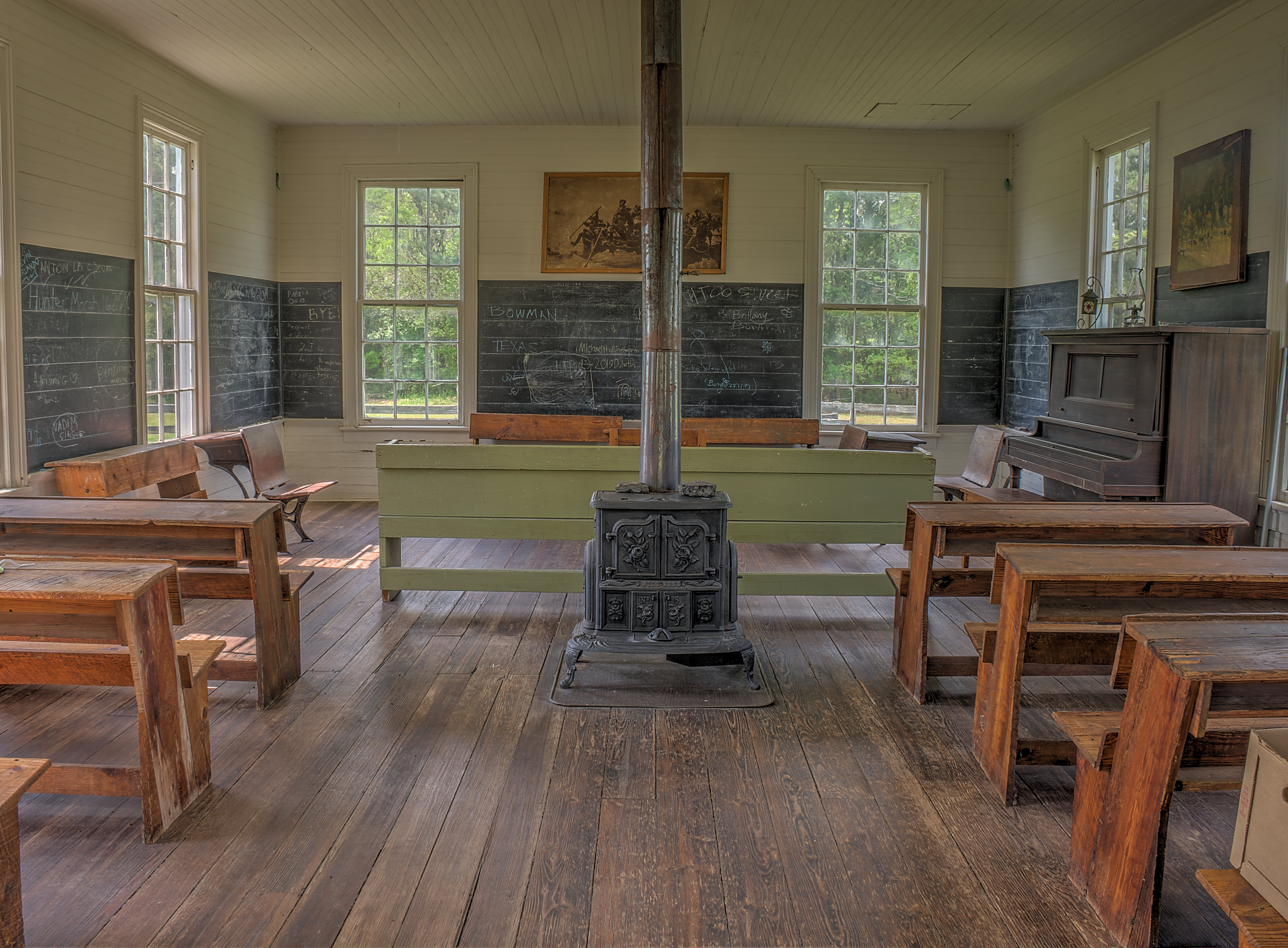
School house interior, 1891

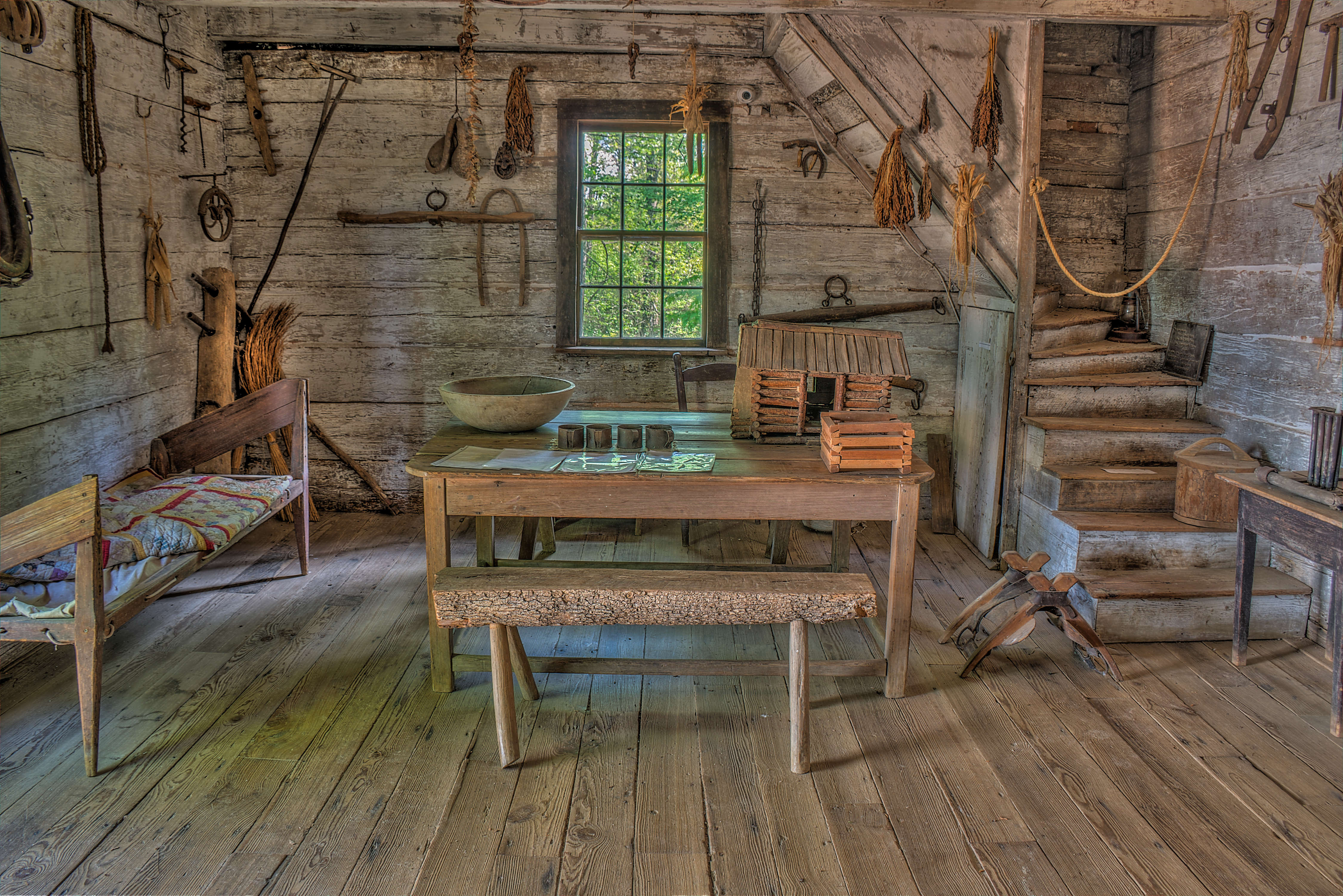
Log cabin interior, c. 1785

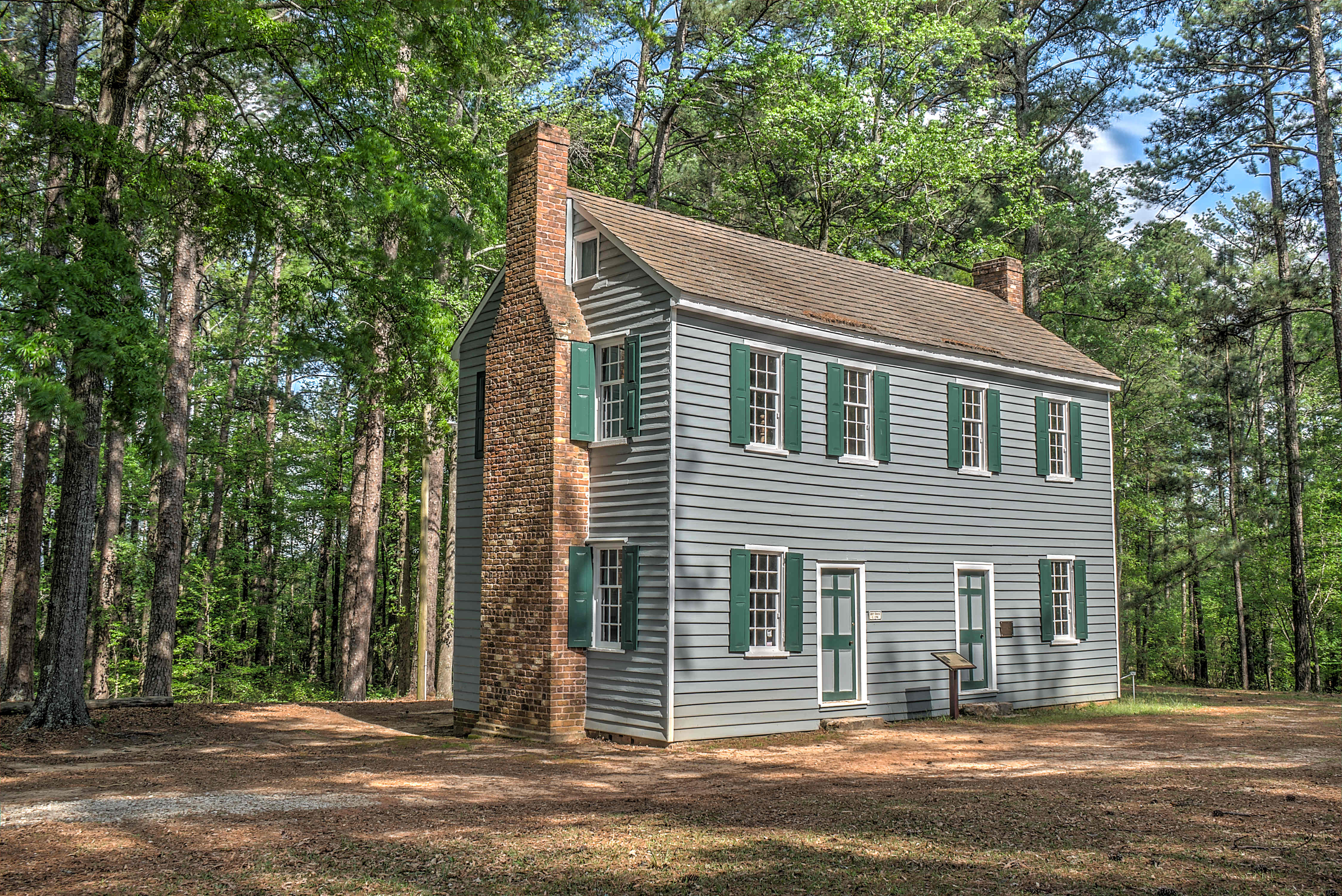
Grey House, c. 1790

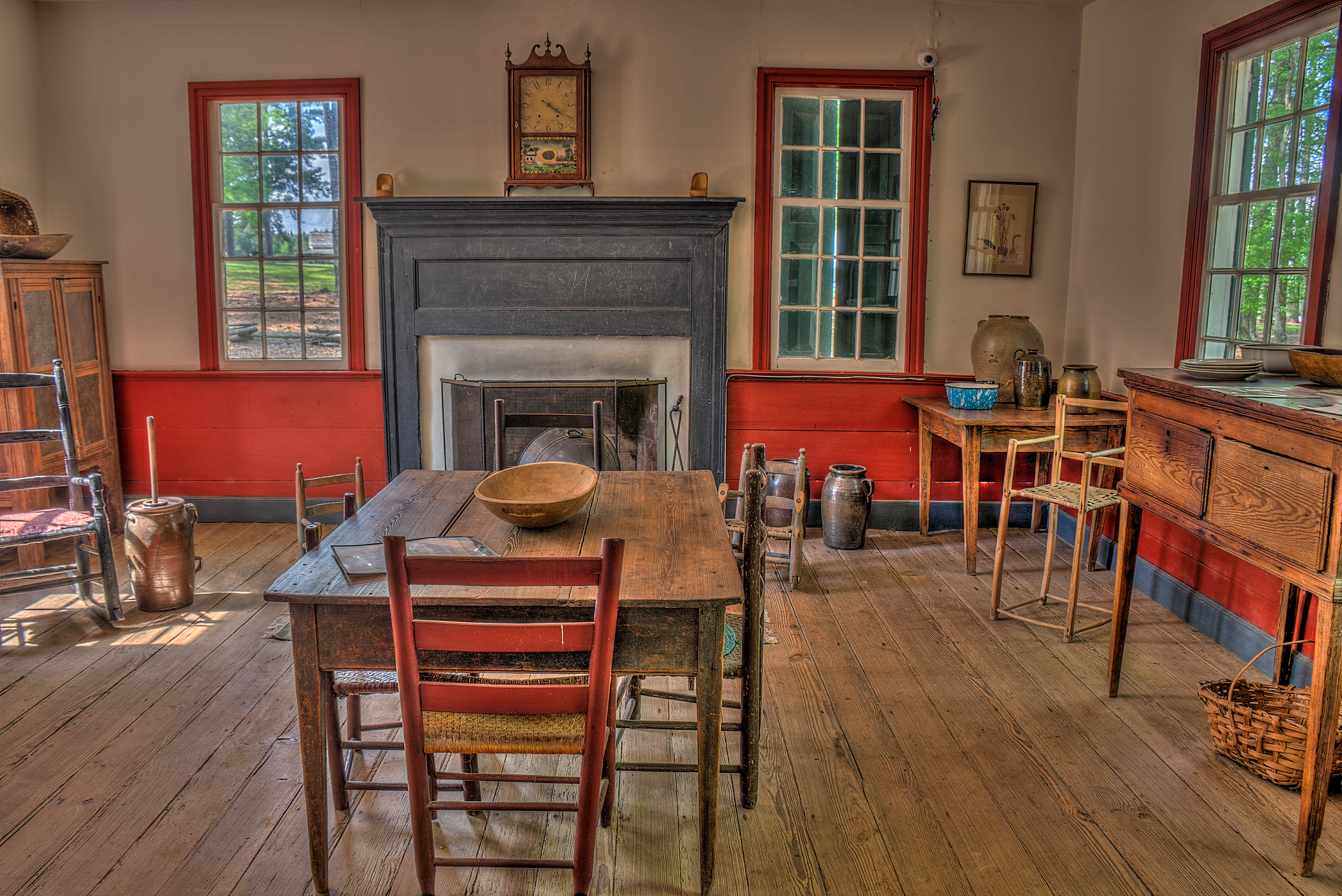
Grey House interior, c. 1790

== Controversy ==
On 25 March 2021, a photo was taken of Georgia state governor, Brian Kemp as he signed into law the Election Integrity Act of 2021, and in the backdrop of the photo is a painting of the Callaway Plantation's brick manor house. This caused controversy since the Callaway Plantation held enslaved people, though the house itself was built years after the Civil War, and the Election Integrity Act of 2021 is considered by opponents to specifically target the voting rights of African Americans in Georgia. The juxtaposition of the plantation image above the Governor with the perception of racism in the bill made this headline news on national and international networks. On 28 March 2021 the NAACP and ACLU were among groups that filed court challenges against the Election Integrity Act of 2021.

== See also ==
- History of slavery in Georgia (U.S. state)
- National Register of Historic Places listings in Wilkes County, Georgia
- Slavery in the United States
