= Tupper-Barnett House =

Historic house in Georgia, United States

- Tupper–Barnett House
- U.S. National Register of Historic Places
- U.S. National Historic Landmark
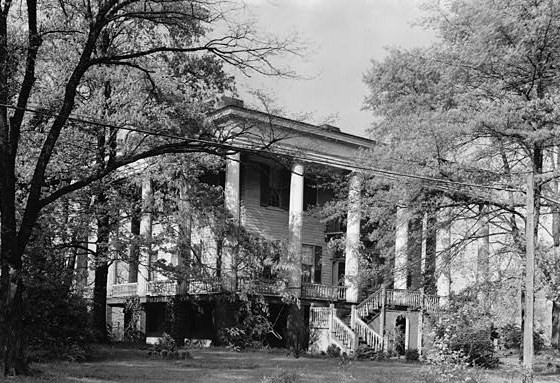
- HABS photo, 1940

- Location within Georgia Location within the United States
- Location: 101 US 78B, Washington, Georgia
- Coordinates: 33.73730°N 82.74103°W
- Built: c. 1832
- Architectural style: Greek Revival, Federal
- NRHP reference No.: 72000411

Significant dates
- Added to NRHP: April 11, 1972
- Designated NHL: November 7, 1973

The Tupper-Barnett House (also known as Bennett House or Barnett Tupper McRae House) is a historic house located at 101 US 78B in Washington, Georgia. Built as a high-end Federal style residence, it was augmented about 1860 with one of the nation's finest examples of a full peristyle Greek Revival colonnade. It was declared a National Historic Landmark on November 7, 1973.

== Description ==
It stands near the center of Washington, at the northwest corner of United States Route 78B and Allison Street. It is a two-story wood-framed structure, set on a high foundation. It is completely encircled by a two-story colonnade of fluted Doric columns, which are supported by brick piers, providing a covered walkway under the porch. Access to the main entrance is provided by a projecting open porch with stairs extending to the sides. Its main facade behind the colonnade is five bays wide, with the main entrance in the center bay, flanked by sidelight windows and topped by an arched transom window. Above the entrance is a second door with similar styling, which opens onto an iron balcony.

The interior of the house follows a typical Federal period center hall plan, with a pair of rooms on each side on each floor. The front parlors on the main floor have exceptionally high quality woodwork with elaborate details, while other rooms have simpler detail but still high quality.

== History ==
The house was built around 1832 by William H. Pope, and eventually came into the ownership of Henry Tupper, ~~who in about 1860 added the colonnade.~~ This work was done in such a seamless way that it is difficult to discern that it was in fact a later addition. In the early 20th century the house was owned by Edward Augustus Barnett, a mayor of Washington.

== See also ==
- List of National Historic Landmarks in Georgia (U.S. state)
- National Register of Historic Places listings in Wilkes County, Georgia
