= List of National Historic Landmarks in Georgia =

This is a List of National Historic Landmarks in Georgia. The United States National Historic Landmark program is operated under the auspices of the National Park Service, and recognizes structures, districts, objects, and similar resources according to a list of criteria of national significance.

As of 2023, the state of Georgia is home to 50 of these landmarks.

== Key ==
	National Historic Landmark
^{†}	National Historic Landmark District
^{#}	National Historic Site, National Historical Park, National Memorial, or National Monument
^{*}	Delisted Landmark

== Current NHLs ==
	Landmark name	Image	Date designated	Location	County	Description
1	Andalusia Farm	Andalusia Farm	February 24, 2022 (#80000968)	Milledgeville; 33°07′31″N 83°16′04″W	Baldwin	Home of author Flannery O'Connor
2	Bellevue	Bellevue	November 7, 1973 (#72000400)	La Grange; 33°02′30″N 85°02′22″W	Troup	Historic home of Senator Benjamin Harvey Hill; example of a Greek Revival "domesticated temple"
3	Stephen Vincent Benet House	Stephen Vincent Benet House	November 11, 1971 (#71000286)	Augusta; 33°28′33″N 82°01′27″W	Richmond	Commandant's home in Augusta Arsenal; poet Stephen Vincent Benét lived and wrote here; now Admissions Office, Summerville campus of Georgia Regents University
4	Calhoun Mine	Calhoun Mine	November 7, 1973 (#73002292)	Dahlonega; 34°33′43″N 83°59′09″W	Lumpkin	Property where gold was discovered in 1828, playing a role in the calls for the Cherokee removal; eventually owned by Senator John C. Calhoun of South Carolina
5	Carmichael House	Carmichael House	November 7, 1973 (#71000265)	Macon; 32°50′29″N 83°38′16″W	Bibb	Greek Revival house from the 1840s, with a spiral staircase in a central tower
6^{†}	Central of Georgia Railroad Shops and Terminal	Central of Georgia Railroad Shops and Terminal	December 8, 1976 (#76000610)	Savannah; 32°04′33″N 81°06′05″W	Chatham	Complex of railroad facilities of the Central of Georgia Railroad
7	Chieftains	Chieftains	November 11, 1973 (#71000273)	Rome; 34°16′38″N 85°10′13″W	Floyd	Home of Cherokee Nation chief Major Ridge
8	College Hill	College Hill	November 11, 1971 (#71000287)	Augusta; 33°28′03″N 82°00′55″W	Richmond	Home of George Walton, signer of Declaration of Independence
9^{†}	Columbus Historic Riverfront Industrial District	Columbus Historic Riverfront Industrial District	June 2, 1978 (#78000995)	Columbus; 32°28′53″N 84°59′30″W	Muscogee	Four separated areas along the Chattahoochee River; includes Columbus Iron Works
10	Dixie Coca-Cola Bottling Company Plant	Dixie Coca-Cola Bottling Company Plant	May 4, 1983 (#77000428)	Atlanta; 33°45′16″N 84°23′03″W	Fulton	The building, now the home of Georgia State University's Baptist Student Union, was the first place where Coca-Cola bottled its soda.
11	Dorchester Academy Boys' Dormitory	Dorchester Academy Boys' Dormitory	September 20, 2006 (#86001371)	Midway; 31°48′02″N 81°27′56″W	Liberty	Associated with the Southern Christian Leadership's Citizen Education Program
12	Etowah Mounds	Etowah Mounds	July 19, 1964 (#66000272)	Cartersville; 34°07′30″N 84°48′28″W	Bartow	Three main mounds at the site; three lesser known mounds; inhabited from about 1000–1550 A.D. by Native Americans of the Mississippian culture
13	Fort James Jackson	Fort James Jackson	February 16, 2000 (#70000200)	Savannah; 32°04′55″N 81°02′10″W	Chatham	Built in the period 1808–1812; defended Savannah and its harbor; used by the Confederacy; withstood a minor Union attack in 1862
14	Fox Theatre	Fox Theatre	May 11, 1976 (#74002230)	Atlanta; 33°46′22″N 84°23′06″W	Fulton	Grand movie palace; built in the 1920s; Moorish design
15	Governor's Mansion	Governor's Mansion	November 7, 1973 (#70000194)	Milledgeville; 33°04′48″N 83°13′55″W	Baldwin	Executive Mansion from 1838 to 1868
16	Henry W. Grady House	Henry W. Grady House	May 11, 1976 (#76000613)	Athens; 33°57′42″N 83°23′18″W	Clarke	Greek Revival house; purchased by Henry W. Grady in 1863, editor of the "Atlanta Constitution"
17	Green-Meldrim House	Green-Meldrim House	May 11, 1976 (#74000664)	Savannah; 32°04′26″N 81°05′41″W	Chatham	Designed and built between 1853 and 1861; Gothic Revival style; cast-iron porch and fence
18	Joel Chandler Harris House	Joel Chandler Harris House	December 19, 1962 (#66000281)	Atlanta; 33°44′16″N 84°25′20″W	Fulton	Home of Joel Chandler Harris from 1881 to 1908; editor and columnist of the Atlanta Constitution newspaper; most known as author of the "Uncle Remus" tales
19	Hay House	Hay House	November 7, 1973 (#71000259)	Macon; 32°50′25″N 83°38′01″W	Bibb	Built from 1855 to in 1859; Italian Renaissance Revival style; 18,000 square feet (1,700 m^{2}); twenty-four rooms; four levels; crowned by a cupola
20	Herndon Home	Herndon Home	February 16, 2000 (#00000261)	Atlanta; 33°45′21″N 84°24′25″W	Fulton	Home of Alonzo Franklin Herndon, founder of the Atlanta Life Insurance Company
21^{†}	Historic Augusta Canal and Industrial District	Historic Augusta Canal and Industrial District	December 22, 1977 (#71000285)	Augusta; 33°30′08″N 81°59′57″W	Richmond	Completed in 1847; harnessed the power of the fall line of the Savannah River for mills; provided drinking water for Augusta, Georgia
22^{†}	Jekyll Island Historic District	Jekyll Island Historic District	June 2, 1978 (#72000385)	Jekyll Island; 31°03′38″N 81°25′19″W	Glynn	Founded in 1886; originally an elitist, segregated private club located on Jekyll Island, on the Georgia coastline
23^{#}	Martin Luther King Jr. Historic District	Martin Luther King Jr. Historic District	May 5, 1977 (#74000677)	Atlanta; 33°45′18″N 84°22′20″W	Fulton	Includes Martin Luther King, Jr.'s boyhood home; Ebenezer Baptist Church, a church where King pastored, is also part of the national historic site
24	Kolomoki Mounds	Kolomoki Mounds	July 19, 1964 (#66000280)	Blakely; 31°28′17″N 84°55′46″W	Early	Woodland Period mounds
25	Lapham-Patterson House	Lapham-Patterson House	November 7, 1973 (#70000868)	Thomasville; 30°50′44″N 83°58′59″W	Thomas	Built 1884-85; Victorian architecture; fishscale shingles; intricately designed porch; long-leaf pine inlaid floors; and a double-flue chimney; intentional lack of symmetry; no windows, doors, or closets are square
26	Liberty Hall	Liberty Hall	May 4, 1983 (#70000216)	Crawfordville; 33°33′28″N 82°53′45″W	Taliaferro	Home of Confederate States of America Vice President Alexander Stephens
27^{†}	Juliette Gordon Low Historic District	Juliette Gordon Low Historic District	June 23, 1965 (#66000276)	Savannah; 32°04′37″N 81°05′33″W	Chatham	First Girl Scout meetingplace; birthplace and home of founder Juliette Gordon Low
28^{†}	New Echota	New Echota	November 7, 1973 (#70000869)	Calhoun; 34°32′27″N 84°54′34″W	Gordon	In 1825, officially designated capital of the Cherokee Nation
29	Octagon House	Octagon House	November 7, 1973 (#69000049)	Columbus; 32°27′23″N 84°59′32″W	Muscogee	Octagon house is also known as May's Folly
30	Old Medical College	Old Medical College	June 19, 1996 (#72000398)	Augusta; 33°28′13″N 81°57′47″W	Richmond	Original Medical College of Georgia; founded in 1829
31	Owens-Thomas House	Owens-Thomas House	May 11, 1976 (#76000611)	Savannah; 32°04′39″N 81°05′22″W	Chatham	English Regency house designed by William Jay; Marquis de La Fayette stayed here during 1824-25
32^{†}	Pine Mountain State Park	Pine Mountain State Park	September 26, 1997 (#97001273)	Pine Mountain; 32°49′55″N 84°48′29″W	Harris	Park near Warm Springs associated with FDR; now a portion of F. D. Roosevelt State Park.
33	John Ross House	John Ross House	November 7, 1973 (#73000647)	Rossville; 34°58′52″N 85°17′05″W	Walker	Home of the Cherokee chief John Ross
34^{†}	St. Catherine's Island	St. Catherine's Island	December 16, 1969 (#69000332)	South Newport; 31°37′50″N 81°09′37″W	Liberty	Site of Santa Catalina de Guale, the first Spanish outpost in Georgia; home of Button Gwinnett
35^{†}	Savannah Historic District	Savannah Historic District	November 13, 1966 (#66000277)	Savannah; 32°04′28″N 81°05′30″W	Chatham	
36	William Scarbrough House	William Scarbrough House	November 7, 1973 (#70000201)	Savannah; 32°04′52″N 81°05′50″W	Chatham	Greek Revival house; finished in 1819; now houses Ships of the Sea Maritime Museum
37	Springer Opera House	Springer Opera House	June 2, 1978 (#70000214)	Columbus; 32°27′54″N 84°59′29″W	Muscogee	Historic live performance theater
38	Stallings Island		January 20, 1961 (#66000279)	Augusta; 33°33′39″N 82°02′47″W	Columbia	Archeological site with shell mounds
39	State Capitol	State Capitol	November 7, 1973 (#71001099)	Atlanta; 33°44′57″N 84°23′18″W	Fulton	Completed 1889; still in use
40	Stone Hall, Atlanta University	Stone Hall, Atlanta University	December 2, 1974 (#74000680)	Atlanta; 33°45′16″N 84°24′31″W	Fulton	Completed in 1882; Atlanta University was an educational institution for freed slaves
41^{†}	Sweet Auburn Historic District	Sweet Auburn Historic District	December 8, 1976 (#76000631)	Atlanta; 33°45′17″N 84°22′53″W	Fulton	Historic African-American neighborhood
42	Telfair Academy of Arts and Sciences	Telfair Academy of Arts and Sciences	May 11, 1976 (#76000612)	Savannah; 32°04′44″N 81°05′43″W	Chatham	Originally a family townhouse; became a free art museum in 1886
43	Robert Toombs House	Robert Toombs House	November 7, 1973 (#72000410)	Washington; 33°44′10″N 82°44′02″W	Wilkes	Home of Robert Toombs, U.S. Senator, C.S.A. Secretary of State and Confederate Army Brigadier General
44	Traveler's Rest	Traveler's Rest	January 29, 1964 (#66000283)	Toccoa; 34°36′33″N 83°14′20″W	Stephens	Early tavern and inn, also a state historic site
45	Tupper-Barnett House	Tupper-Barnett House	November 7, 1973 (#72000411)	Washington; 33°44′14″N 82°44′28″W	Wilkes	Originally Federal style; converted to Neoclassical mansion
46	U.S. Post Office and Courthouse	U.S. Post Office and Courthouse	July 21, 2015 (#74000681)	Atlanta; 33°45′23″N 84°23′25″W	Fulton	Neo-Renaissance building, now home to Eleventh Circuit Court of Appeals, was where many key civil rights cases were first heard and decided.
47	George Walton House	George Walton House	December 21, 1981 (#76000646)	Augusta; 33°28′26″N 81°58′47″W	Richmond	Also known as Meadow Garden, this was a home of George Walton, the youngest signer of the Declaration of Independence, also a governor and senator
48^{†}	Warm Springs Historic District	Warm Springs Historic District	January 16, 1980 (#74000694)	Warm Springs; 32°52′51″N 84°41′07″W	Meriwether	Includes Franklin Delano Roosevelt's Little White House and the Roosevelt Warm Springs Institute for Rehabilitation
49	Thomas E. Watson House	Thomas E. Watson House	May 11, 1976 (#76002144)	Thomson; 33°28′15″N 82°30′43″W	McDuffie	Also called Hickory Hill; home of Populist Party co-founder and Vice Presidential candidate Thomas E. Watson.
50	Woodrow Wilson Boyhood Home	Woodrow Wilson Boyhood Home	October 6, 2008 (#79000746)	Augusta; 33°28′18″N 81°57′55″W	Richmond	Home of Woodrow Wilson 1860-72.

== Historic areas administered by the National Park Service ==
National Historic Sites, National Historical Parks, National Monuments, and certain other areas listed in the National Park system are historic landmarks of national importance. There are eight of these in Georgia. The National Park Service lists these eight together with the NHLs in the state, The Martin Luther King, Jr. National Historic Site is also an NHL and is listed above. The remaining seven are:

	Landmark name	Image	Date established	Location	County	Description
1	Andersonville National Historic Site	Monuments at Andersonville National Historic Site	October 16, 1970	Andersonville; 32.19469°N 84.12895°W	Macon	Prisoner-of-war camp during the American Civil War
2	Chickamauga and Chattanooga National Military Park	Chickamauga and Chattanooga National Military Park	August 19, 1890	34°56′24″N 85°15′36″W	Catoosa, Dade, & Walker Counties	Shared with Tennessee. Site of two major battles during the American Civil War
3	Fort Frederica National Monument	Photo of the current Fort Frederica site	May 26, 1936	St. Simons Island; 31°13′26″N 81°23′36″W	Glynn	18th century fort built by James Oglethorpe to protect the British colony of Georgia
4	Fort Pulaski National Monument	Exterior of Fort Pulaski	October 15, 1924	Cockspur Island; 32°1′38″N 80°53′25″W	Chatham	19th century fort used during the American Civil War
5	Jimmy Carter National Historic Site	1989 HABS photograph of Jimmy Carter Boyhood Home	December 23, 1987	Plains; 32°02′02″N 84°24′00″W	Sumter	Preserves various locations important to the life of former Georgia governor and United States President Jimmy Carter
6	Kennesaw Mountain National Battlefield Park	Picture of cannon at Kennesaw Mountain	February 8, 1917	Kennesaw; 33°58′59″N 84°34′41″W	Cobb	Battleground during the American Civil War
7	Ocmulgee Mounds National Historical Park	Earth Lodge, Ocmulgee National Monument	June 14, 1934	Macon; 32°50′12″N 83°36′30″W	Bibb	Preserves earthworks associated with Mississippian Native Americans, as well as other archaeological evidence

== See also ==
- Historic preservation
- National Register of Historic Places listings in Georgia
- History of Georgia (U.S. state)
- List of National Natural Landmarks in Georgia
