= The Cedars (Washington, Georgia) =

Historic house in Georgia, United States

- U.S. National Register of Historic Places
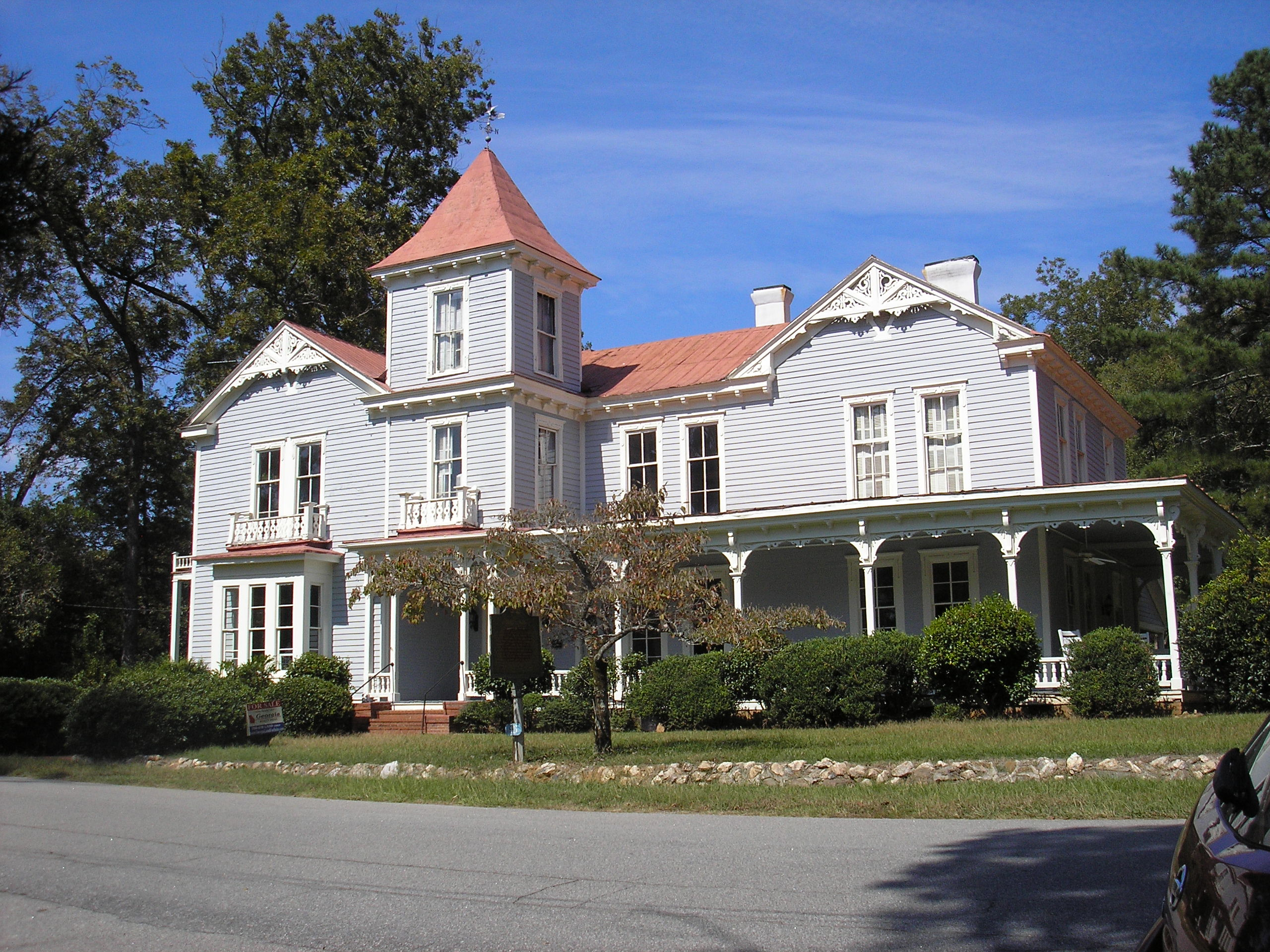

- Location within Georgia
- Location: 201 Sims St., Washington, Georgia
- Coordinates: 33°44′29″N 82°44′19″W
- Area: 2 acres (0.81 ha)
- Built: c.1793, 1885
- Built by: Poullain, Anthony; Sims, Marshall
- Architectural style: Stick/Eastlake, High Victorian
- NRHP reference No.: 72000403
- Added to NRHP: April 11, 1972

The Cedars is a historic residence in Washington, Georgia. It was added to the National Register of Historic Places on April 11, 1972. It is located at 201 Sims Street.

The original house on the site was built in c.1793; its kitchen survives in the existing house. The house includes Stick/Eastlake architecture.

== See also ==
- National Register of Historic Places listings in Wilkes County, Georgia
