= Cherry Grove Baptist Church Schoolhouse =

- U.S. National Register of Historic Places
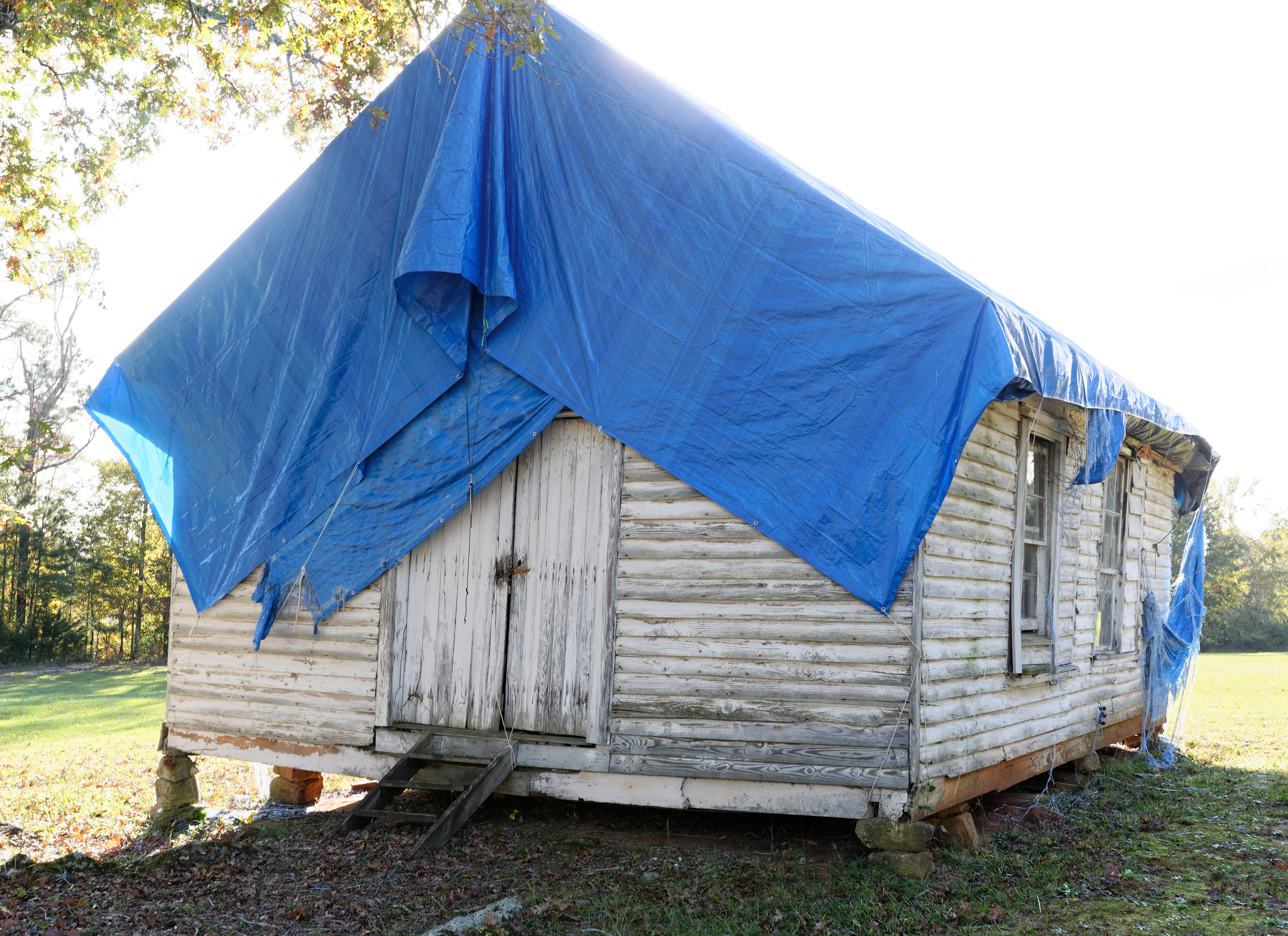
- In 2020.

- Location within Georgia Location within the United States
- Location: 1878 Danburg Road, Washington, Georgia, United States
- Coordinates: 33.76769°N 82.69848°W
- Built: c. 1910
- NRHP reference No.: 100005300
- Added to NRHP: June 23, 2020

Cherry Grove Baptist Church Schoolhouse built c. 1910, is a rural African American school building in the vicinity of Washington, a city in Wilkes County, Georgia. This building is a rare surviving example of this genre of 20th century architecture, and it has importance to African American heritage. It is listed on the National Register of Historic Places since June 23, 2020.

== History ==
Cherry Grove Baptist Church congregation was founded in 1875, it was one of the many churches that had grown out of the Springfield Baptist Church in Washington, Georgia. Gospel singer Sister Rosetta Tharpe would perform at Cherry Grove. The property grounds include the Cherry Grove Baptist Church Cemetery.

The Cherry Grove Baptist Church Schoolhouse was a one-room building used to teach primary school through the seventh grade. It is one of only 15 still in existence African American pre- Rosenwald schoolhouses built on church grounds, located within the state of Georgia.

In 2021, the building made the list of 10 “Places in Peril” by the Georgia Trust for Historic Preservation. It has been, “in dire need of repair.”

== See also ==
- National Register of Historic Places listings in Wilkes County, Georgia
