= Robert Toombs House State Historic Site =

- Robert Toombs House
- U.S. National Register of Historic Places
- U.S. National Historic Landmark
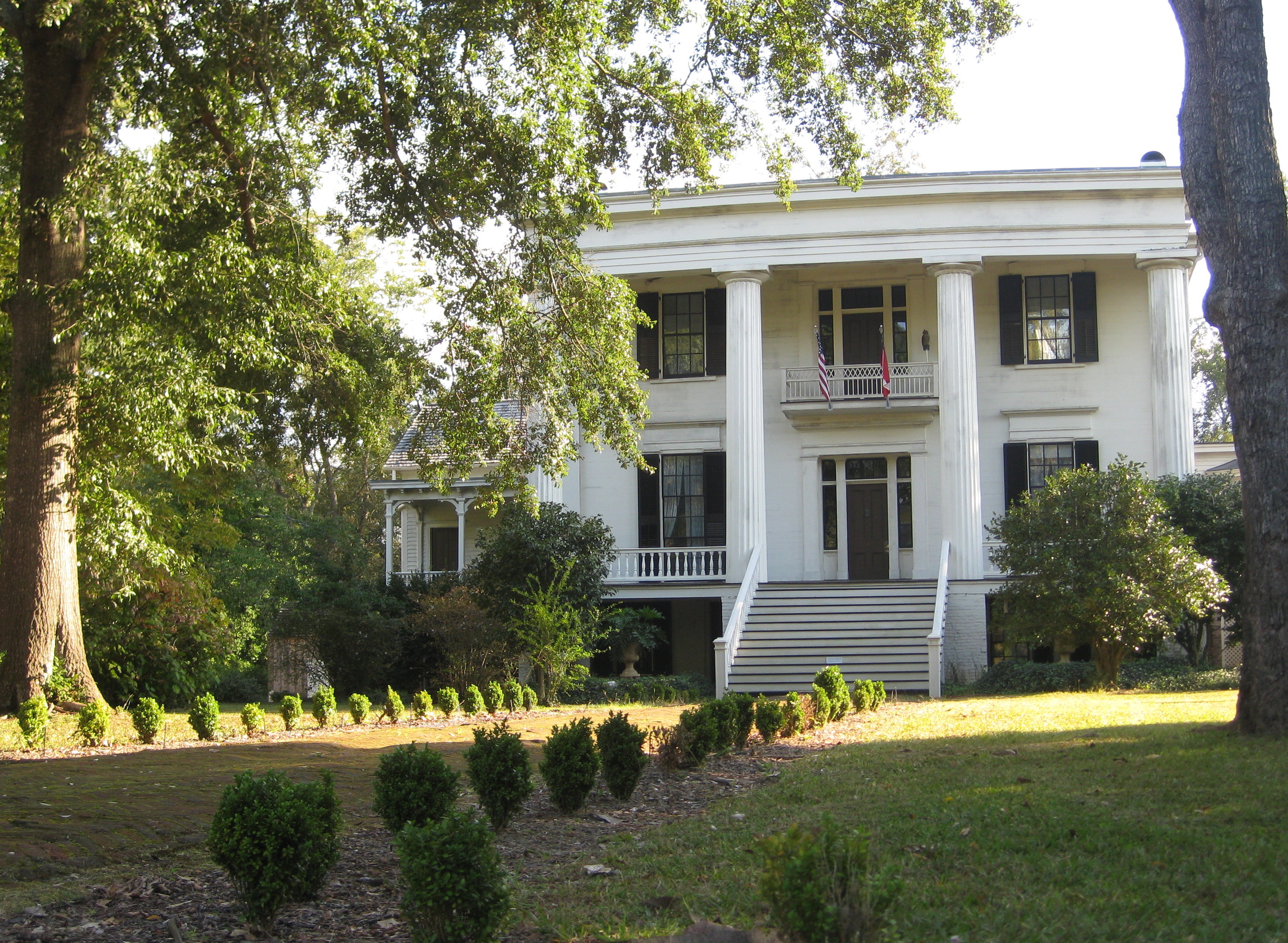

- Location within Georgia Location within the United States
- Location: 216 E. Robert Toombs Ave., Washington, Georgia
- Coordinates: 33.73616°N 82.73387°W
- Built: 1797
- Architectural style: Greek Revival, Federal
- NRHP reference No.: 72000410

Significant dates
- Added to NRHP: April 11, 1972
- Designated NHL: November 7, 1973

The Robert Toombs House State Historic Site is a historic property located at 216 East Robert Toombs Avenue in Washington, Georgia. It was the home of Robert Toombs (1810–85), a U.S. representative and U.S. senator from Georgia who originally opposed Southern secession but later became a Confederate Cabinet official and then a Confederate general during the American Civil War. Operated as a state historic site, the 19th-century period historic house museum features exhibits about the life of Toombs. The house was declared a National Historic Landmark in 1973.

== Description and history ==
The Robert Toombs House State Historic Site is located on the east side of Washington, on the south side of East Robert Toombs Avenue. It is a two-story wood-frame structure, fronted by a two-story colonnade of fluted Doric columns. Its main entrance is flanked by sidelight windows and topped by a transom. The interior of the house has been decorated to reflect its mid-19th century occupation by Robert Toombs, and includes his private library. The house was built sometime between 1794 and 1801 by Doctor Joel Abbott, and was acquired in 1837 by Toombs. Toombs is credited with a number of alterations, including the front colonnade and the west wing.

Robert Toombs was one of the American South's prominent pre-Civil War orators. Although he supported the extension of slavery into the territories, he also opposed the breakup of the country, and was a major supporter of the Compromise of 1850. When the American Civil War began in 1861, he became the Confederate States of America's Secretary of State, but resigned over differences with President Jefferson Davis, and entered the Confederate Army. He fled the country at the end of the war, eventually returning to a successful law practice.

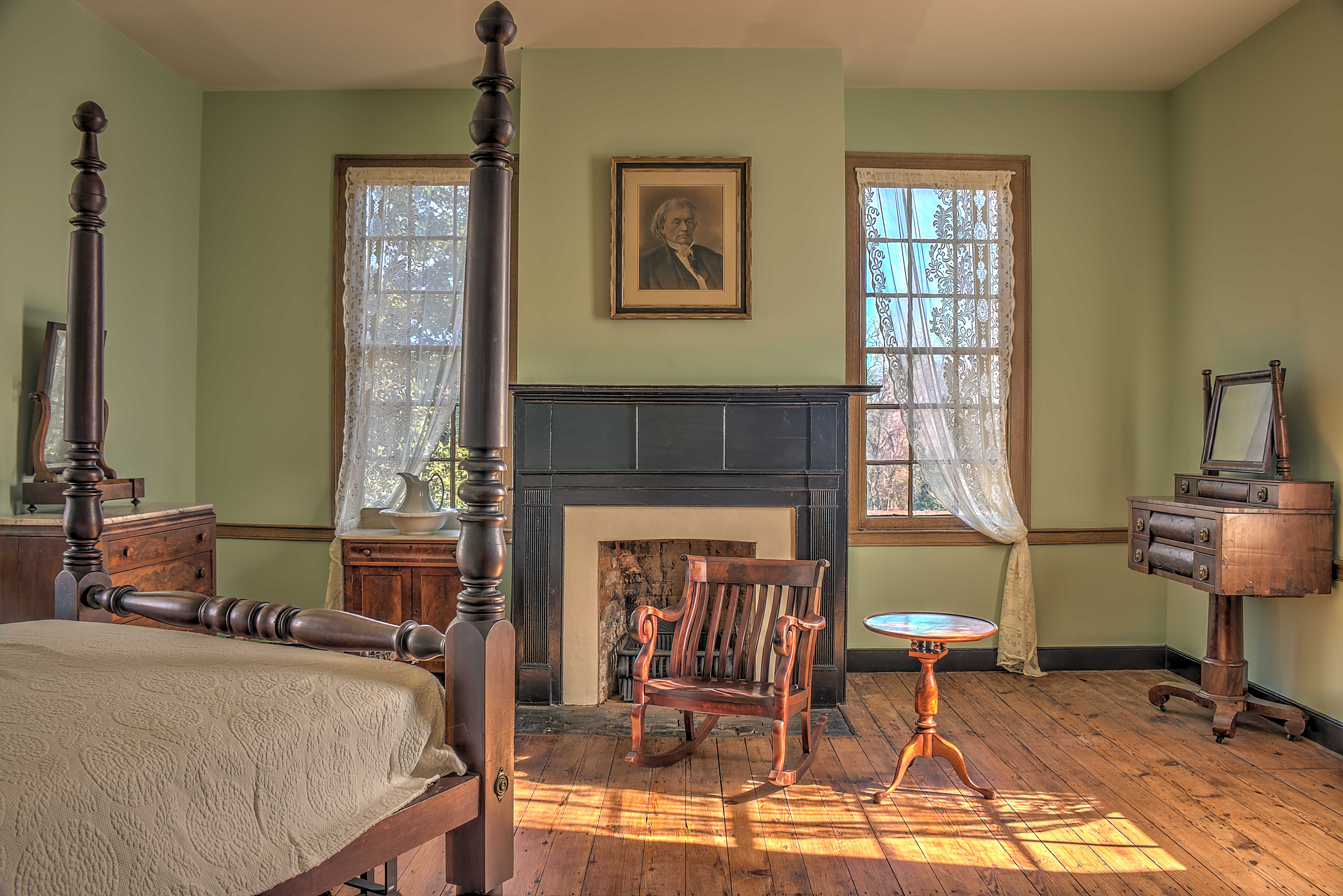
Bedroom

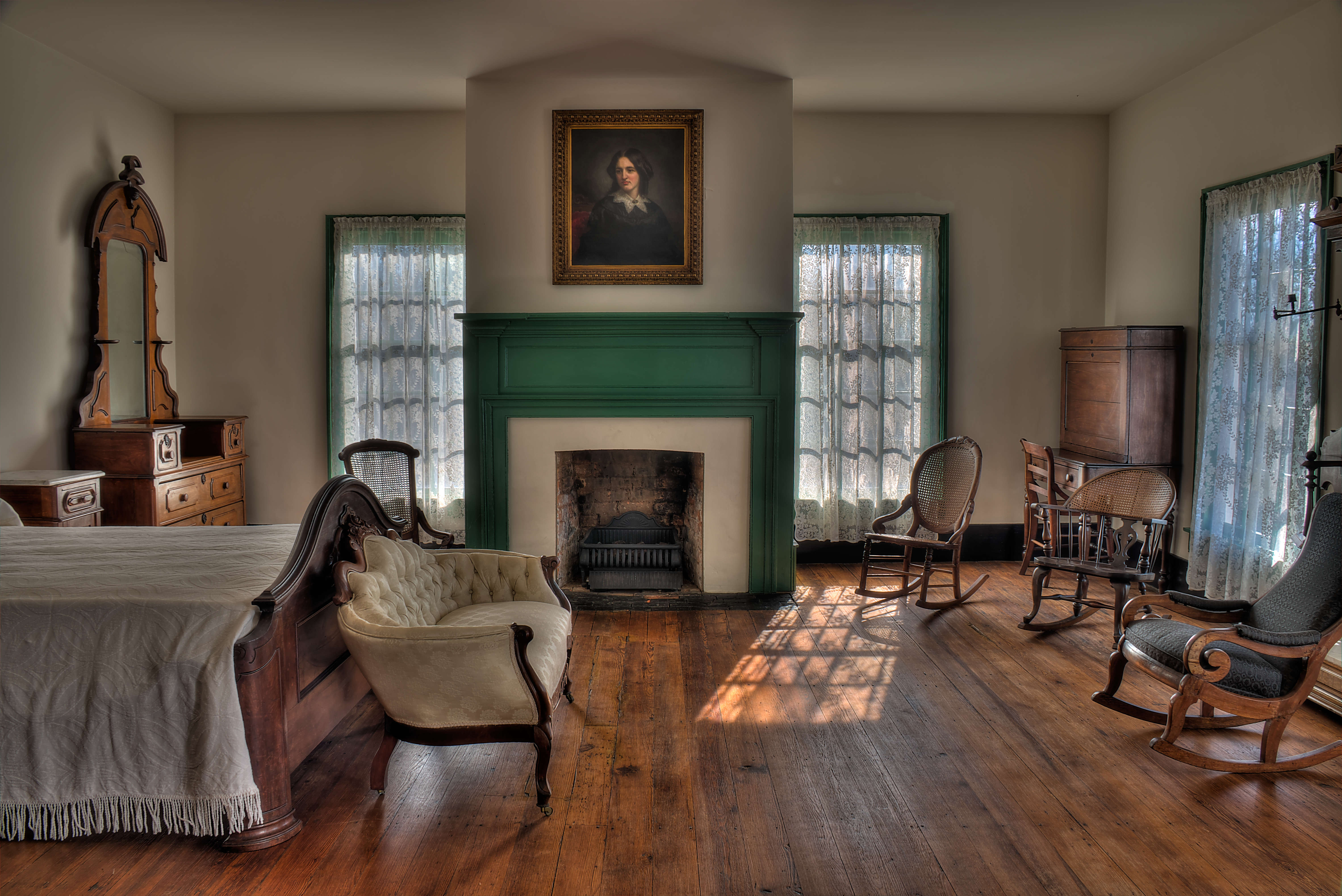
Bedroom

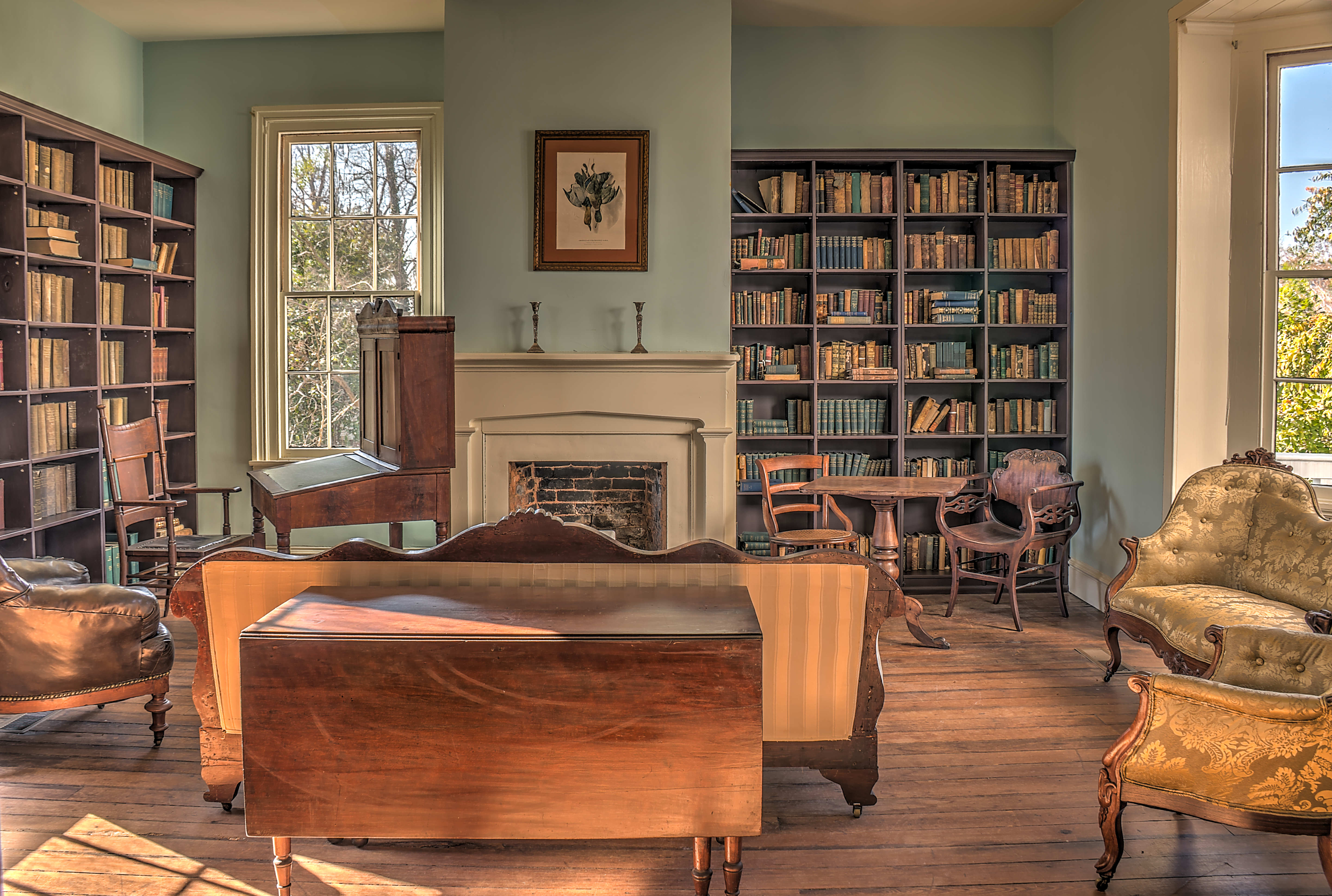
Law Office / Library

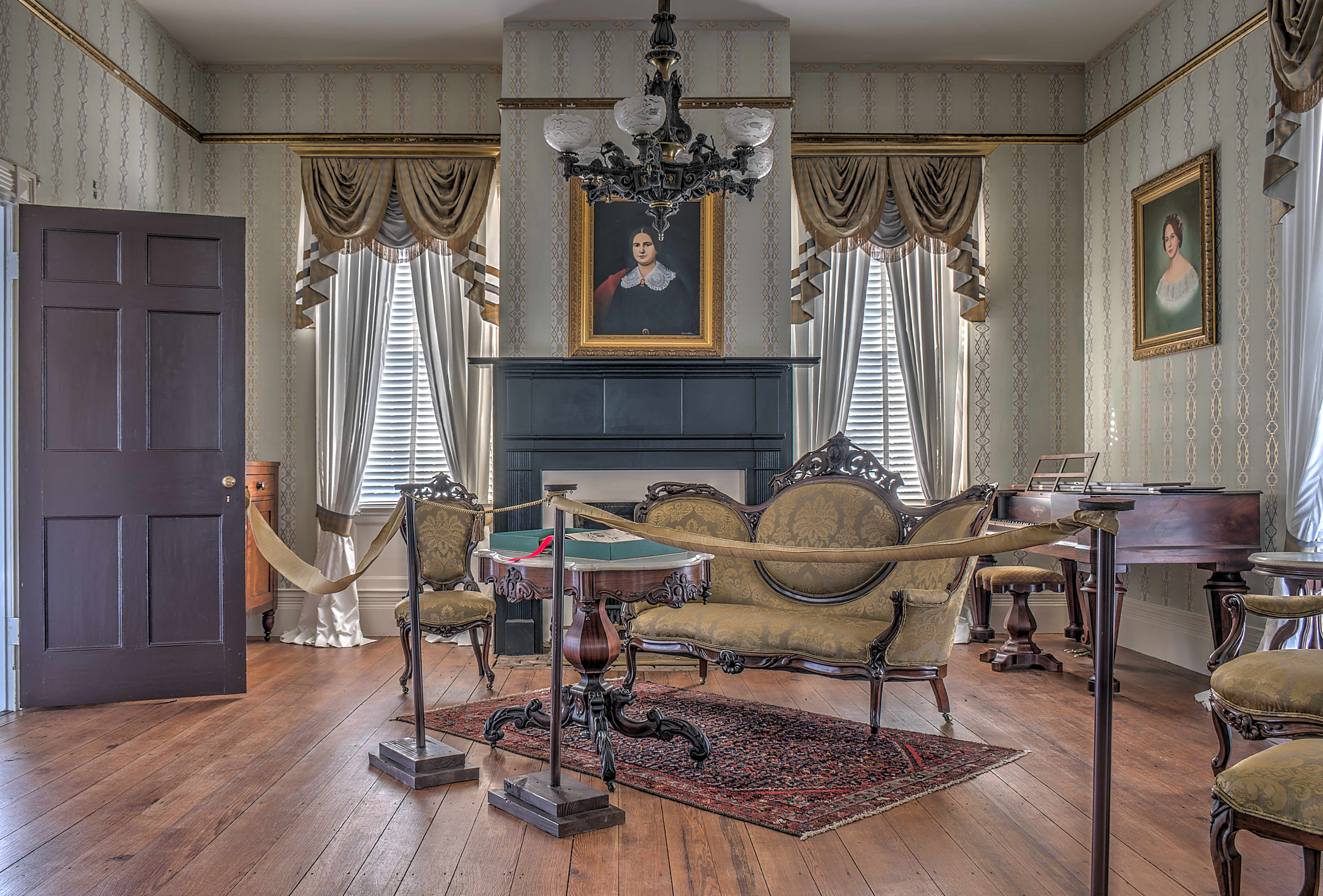
Ladies Parlor

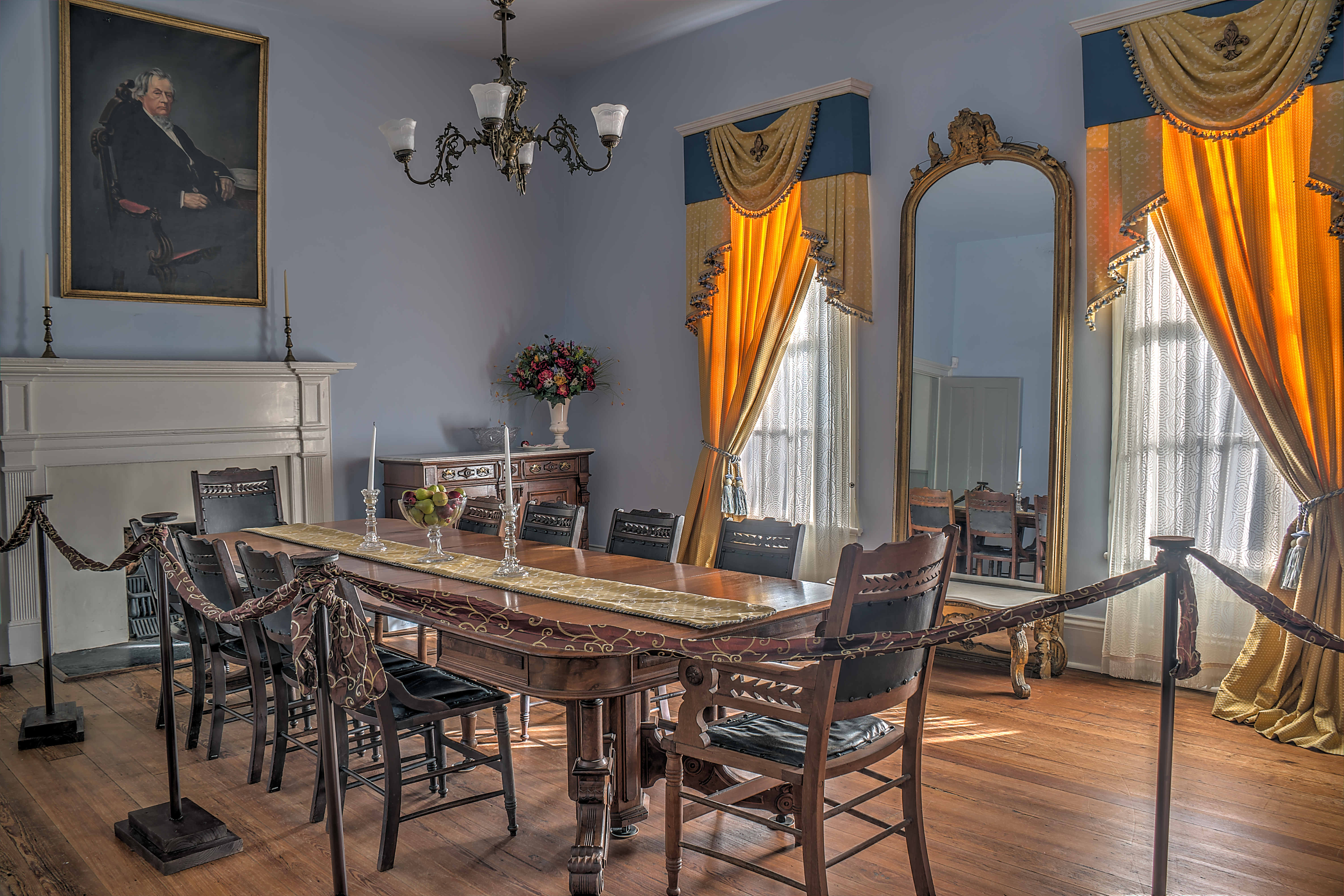
Dining Room

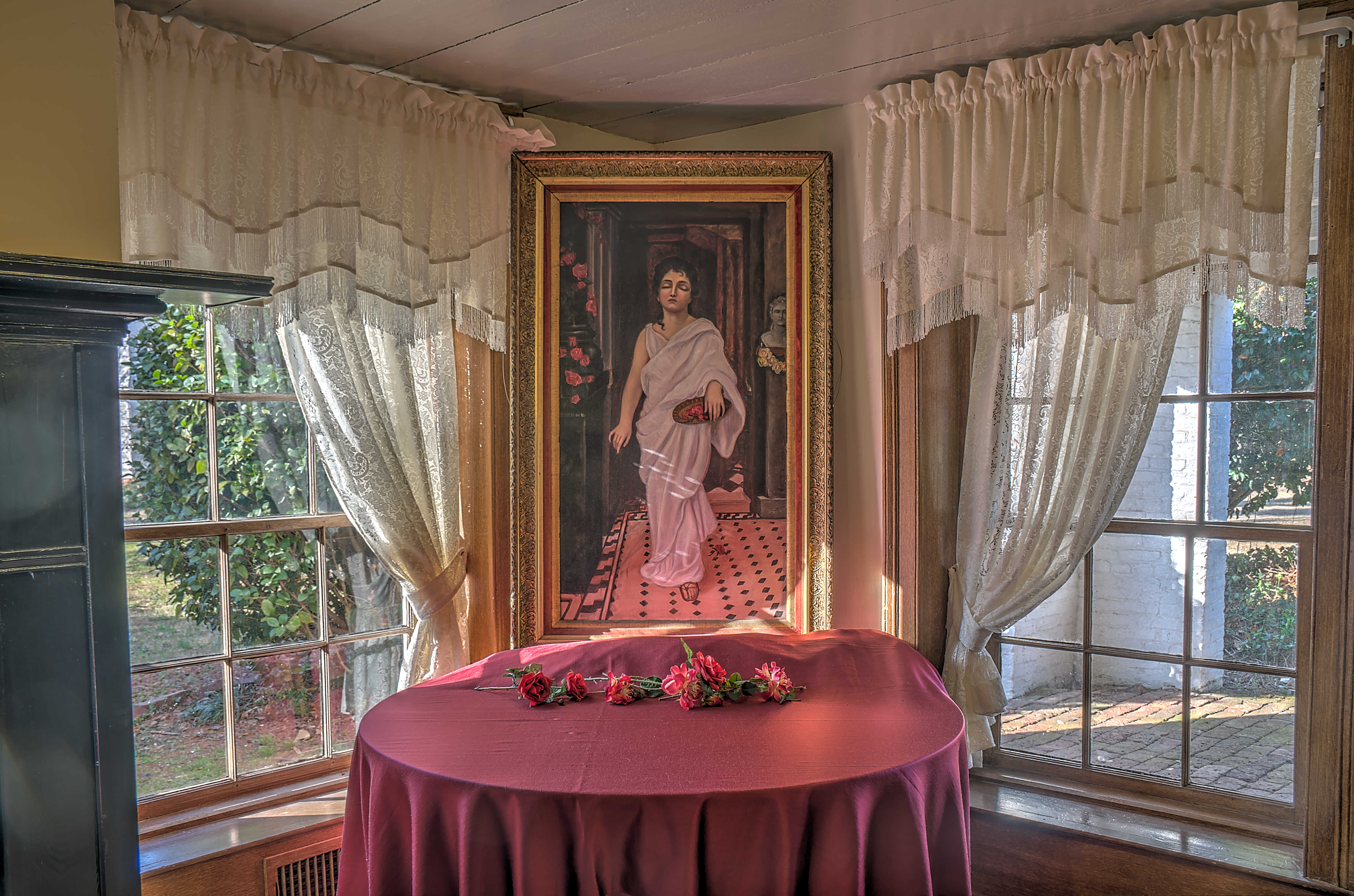
"Ophelia" Painting

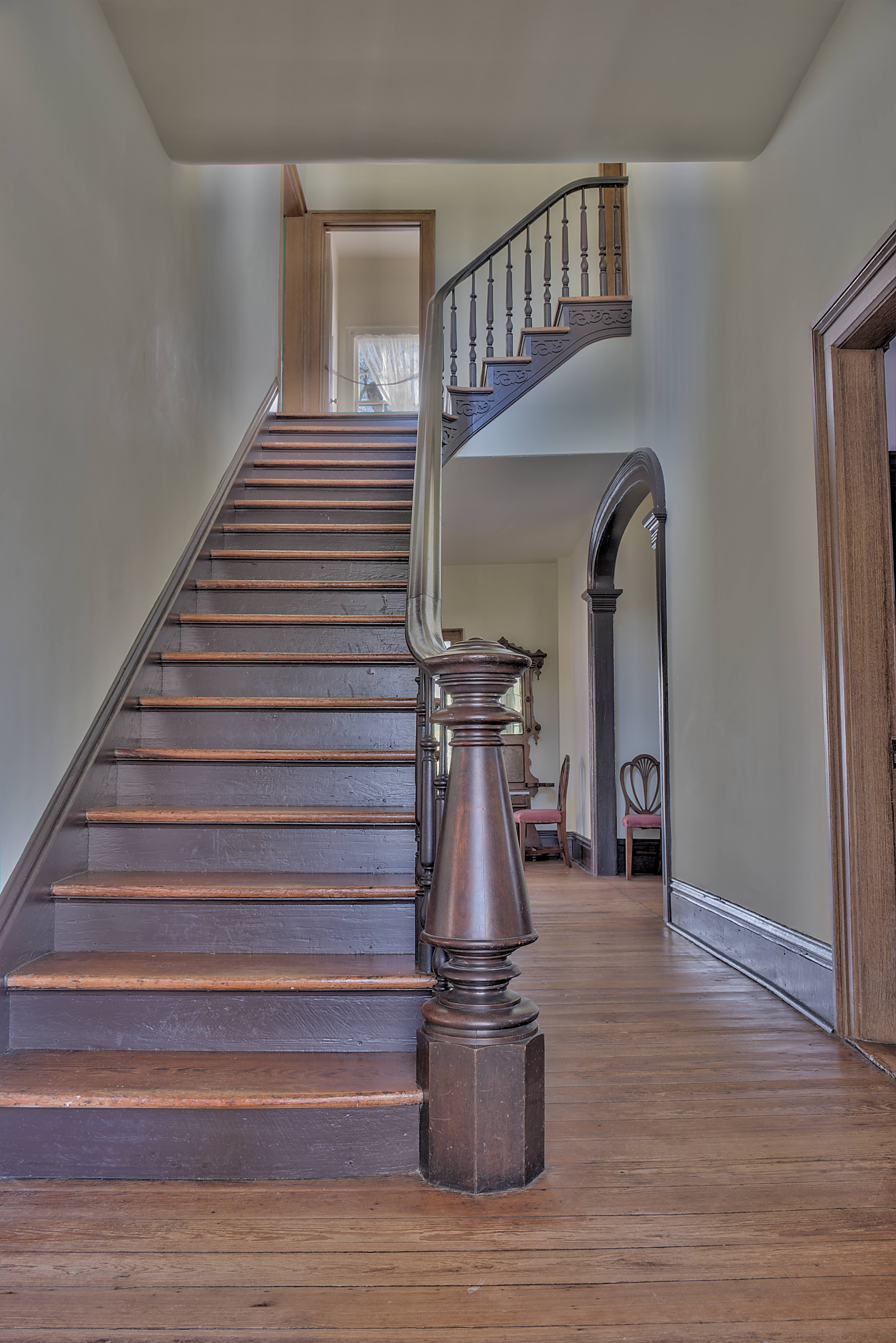
Staircase

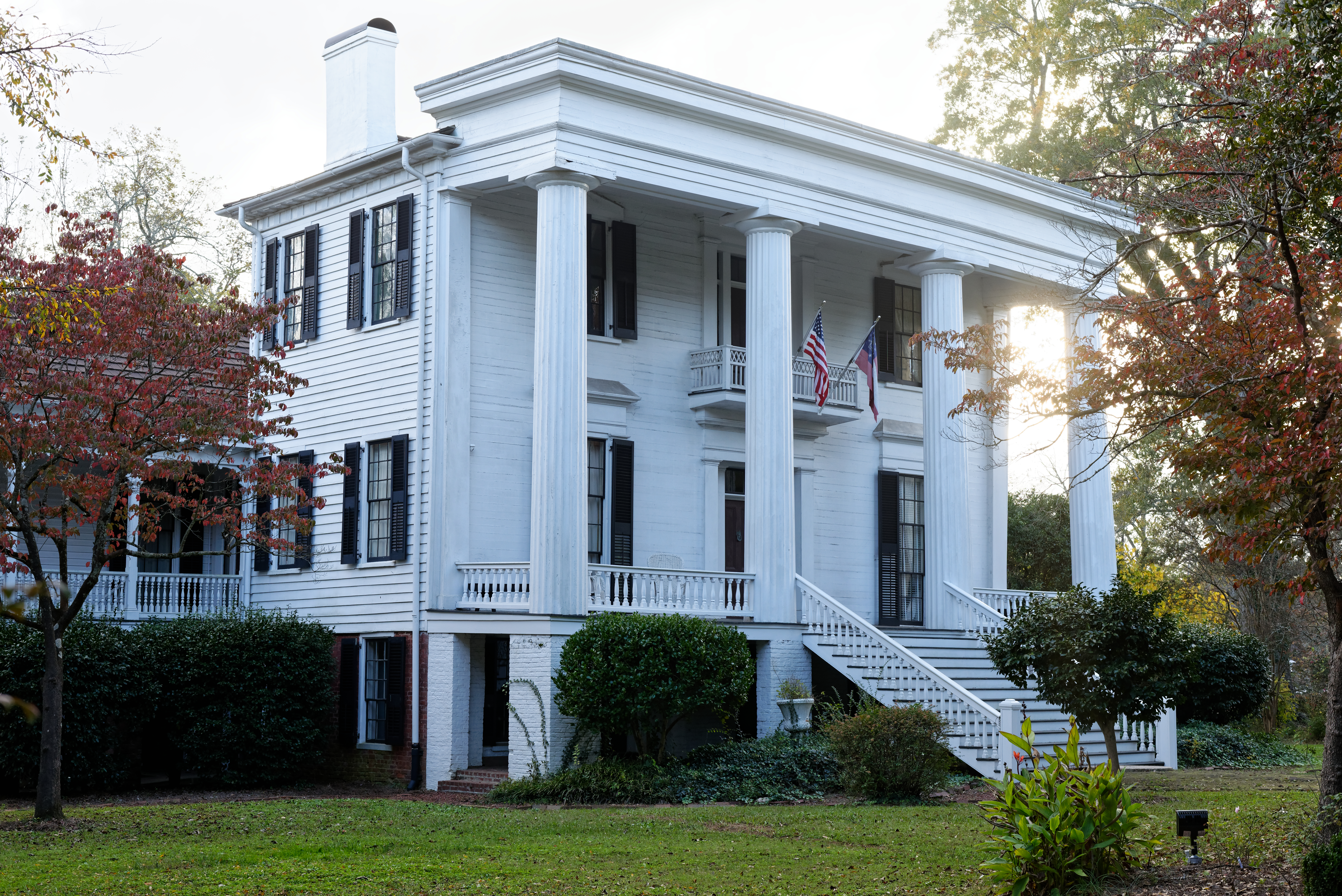
Corner view

== See also ==
- List of National Historic Landmarks in Georgia (U.S. state)
- National Register of Historic Places listings in Wilkes County, Georgia
