= Fitzpatrick Hotel =

Historic hotel in the US state of Georgia

- U.S. National Register of Historic Places
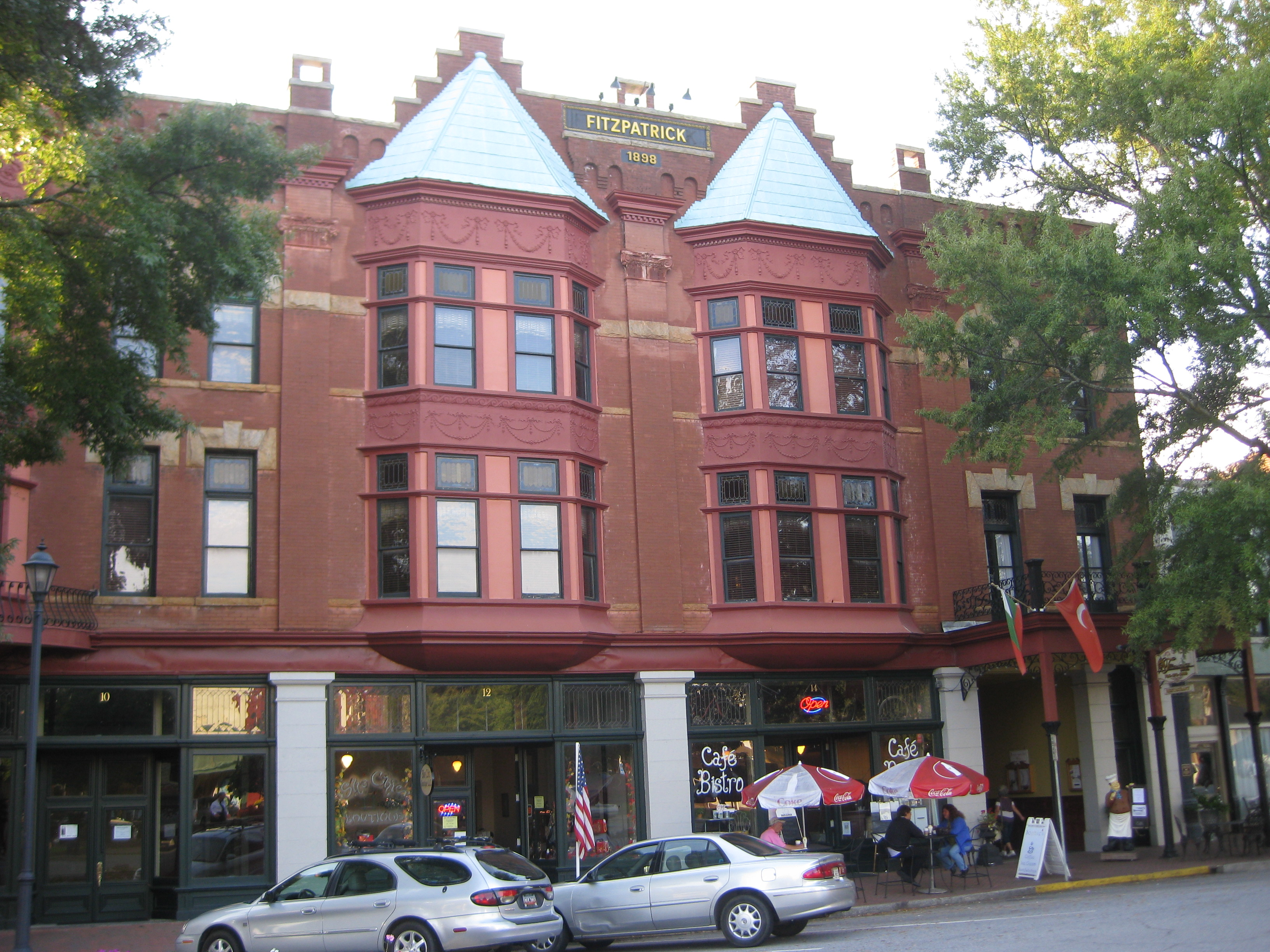
- Fitzpatrick Hotel building

- Location within Georgia
- Location: 18 W. Public Square, Washington, Georgia
- Coordinates: 33°44′14″N 82°44′24″W
- Area: 0.5 acres (0.20 ha)
- Built: 1898
- Architect: Golucke & Stewart
- Architectural style: Queen Anne
- NRHP reference No.: 82000147
- Added to NRHP: December 17, 1982

Fitzpatrick Hotel is a historic hotel in Washington, Georgia. It was built in 1898. It was added to the National Register of Historic Places in 1982. It is located at 16 West Public Square.

A great fire in Washington-Wilkes Georgia in 1895 destroyed the buildings on the site where the hotel was built. It was the first building in Washington to have electricity and a telephone system.

It is a three-story building with load-bearing brick construction that was deemed to be "a fine example of late nineteenth hotel design in a mid-sized Georgia town. Its Queen Anne style design and detailing are particularly outstanding for a hotel in a town of this size. In terms of commerce, the building is significant as an intact example of the hotels located in Georgia's county seats to serve local and county citizens with courthouse business, traveling salesmen (drummers) and out of town visitors."

It was designed by architects Golucke and Stewart. Its Queen Anne exterior detailing includes its "rich mixture of building materials, textures and forms...brick, stone, metal, a corner turret, a balcony, bay windows, stained glass, garlands and swags [that] are combined here in a lively yet coherent manner."

== See also ==
- National Register of Historic Places listings in Wilkes County, Georgia
