= Mary Rankin Cranston =

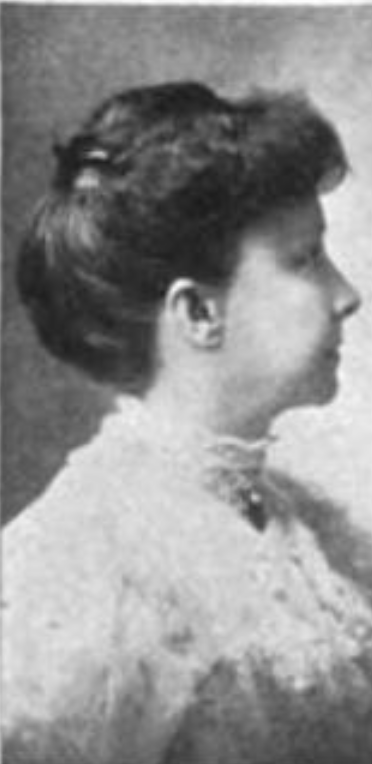
- Cranston in a 1906 publication
- Born: Mary Rankin; 1873; Georgia, U.S.
- Died: April 15, 1931 (aged 57–58); New Brunswick, New Jersey, U.S.
- Other name: Mamie
- Occupations: Librarian; non-fiction writer; sociological engineer; farmer
- Known for: Authority on social settlement work and wage-earning
- Spouses: Henry Cranston; Matthew Benjamin Thomas

Mary Rankin Cranston (née Rankin; after first marriage, Cranston; after second marriage, Thomas; 1873–1931) was an American librarian, non-fiction writer, social researcher, and farmer. Born in Georgia, she moved to New York City where she became an authority on sociological engineering and wage-earning while also serving as the librarian for the American Institute of Social Service. Commissioned by social reformers, she conducted reseaerch on public playgrounds and made studies of cooperative distribution and production in Europe. After lecturing and contributing to publications for many years, Cranston purchased and developed a self-supporting farm she named "Pendidit" near New Brunswick, New Jersey.

== Early life ==
Mary (nickname, "Mamie") Rankin was born in Washington, Georgia, in 1873. Her father, Jesse Rankin, was a druggist.

== Career ==
Cranston lived in Atlanta, Georgia, where she married Henry Cranston. She separated from him and moved to New York City in 1898 where she took a library course. From a position in the library of the University of Pennsylvania, she took the librarianship of the American Institute of Social Service, New York. The Institute had for its aim the "betterment of man", but woman worked for it enthusiastically.

Robert Garrett of Baltimore, a member of the institute, sent Cranston to study the public playgrounds for children all over the United States. She made a thorough examination of these and gave an exhaustive report. No sooner had she returned from this tour, however, than she was directed by Stanley Robert McCormick of Chicago, in 1903, to go to Europe to study social conditions, especially cooperative distribution and production, and to suggest those points wherein the system might be intelligently applied in the United States. She visited shops, factories, homes, and hospitals in England, France, Belgium, Holland, and Italy. Upon her return, she compiled a book dealing with cooperative production and distribution in Europe.

In 1905, she organized the library of the British Institute for Social Service in London, along the lines of those in New York and Paris. She lectured in London and in Stockholm, Sweden.

Cranston contributed to many publications, such as writing of the Belgian La Maison du Peuple, and other European cooperative industries. She also gave a number of lectures in New York and the South. These included, in 1905, in Birmingham, Alabama, lectures on social settlement work in the U.S. and in England. Later in the same year, she lectured in the public schools of New York City.

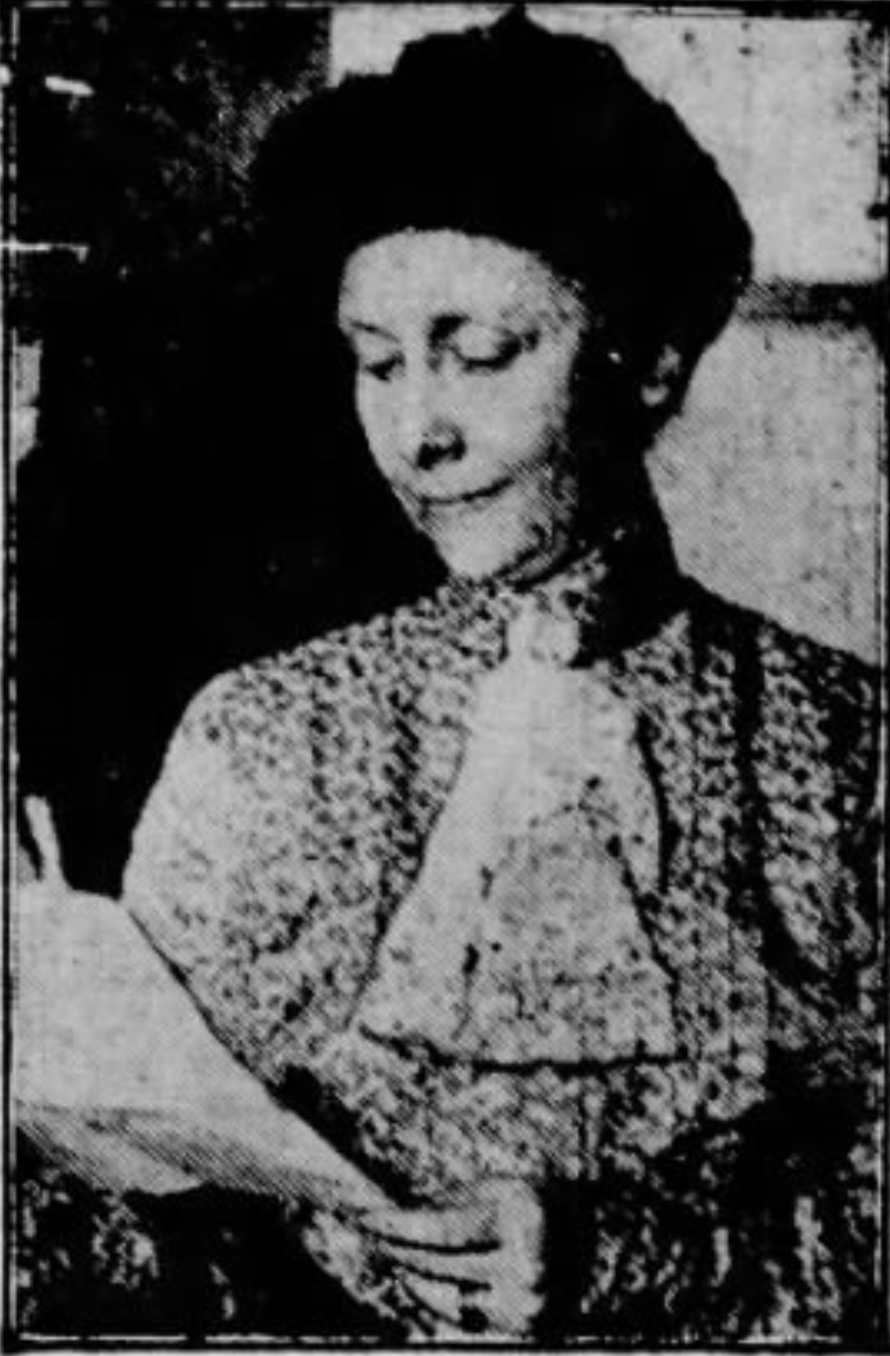
Cranston in 1903

Tired of city life, Cranston decided to buy a farm. She had saved US$600 earned by writing for magazines in her spare time, so she named the farm "Pendidit". Among her requirements for it were that it must have near neighbors for protection as she had no immediate family and would live alone; and it had to be convenient to a good market, for it should be, as far as possible, a self-supporting home. In November 1906, she bought a property in New Brunswick, New Jersey, for US$1,075. There were 14 acres (5.7 ha) of good land, a tiny, dilapidated house and barn, and a number of bearing fruit trees. It was less than 0.5 miles (0.80 km) from the local train station, on the main line of the Pennsylvania Railroad. Cranston continued living and working in New York City, spending time on the farm in summers till May 1909, when she made the New Brunswick farm her permanent home. Thirty-two bearing fruit trees —apples, pears, and cherries— were on the place when she bought it. A few months later, strawberries, raspberries, and currants were set out, followed the next spring with more raspberries, and forty young fruit trees—apples, Bartlett pears, peaches, cherries, and plums. She marketed the fruit herself, finding ready sale in New Brunswick for all that she could produce. She did much of the farm work herself. From the first, all living expenses, such as grocery bills, fuel, lights, laundry, oats for the horse, besides other expenses, such as shoeing, blankets, harness and carriage repairs, the outlay for chickens, for the three dogs, cost of the garden, fertilizer, planting and cultivating field crops, were paid for with money earned by the sale of Pendidit products. The new house and other building expenses, with fencing and grading, were paid for by writing and lectures.

== Personal life ==
On April 17, 1889, she married Henry Cranston (died in Charleston, South Carolina), general agent of the Maryland Life Insurance Company; he was 20 years her senior.

Secondly, she married Matthew Benjamin Thomas, a farmer.

She was a member of the Daughters of the American Revolution.

Mary Rankin Cranston Thomas died in New Brunswick, New Jersey, on April 15, 1931.

== Selected works ==
=== Articles ===
- "Child Wage-Earners in England", The Craftsman, July 1907
- "Converting Backyards into Gardens", The Craftsman, March 1909
- "Co-operative Industries: Civic Lessons from Europe. Illus.", Chatauquan, January 1905
- "Cutting Loose From the City; Experience of One Woman", Country Life, May 1911
- "Drink Evil in England, The Craftsman, January 1908
- "England's Forgotten Wayside Villages", Countryside Magazine, November 1915
- "Fourteen Acres and Freedom", Suburban Life, January 1913
- "The Garden as a Civic Asset", The Craftsman, April 1909
- "Homeless England", The Craftsman, February 1907
- "Housing of the Negro in New York City", The Southern Workman, June 1902 (text)
- "How a Young Woman Made Good at a Man's Job on a New Jersey Farm", Suburban Life, September 1913
- "How I Bought my Farm", The Outlook, New York city, January 1912 (text)
- "How I Found my Farm", the Craftsman, July 1910
- "If you Know of a Vacant Lot", Ladies Home Journal, June 1911
- "La Maison du Peuple", The Chautauquan, October 1904 (text, p. 152)
- "The Living-In System in London"
- "My Beginning as a Farmer", Canadian Colliers, September 1911 (text)
- "My Experience with Chickens", Suburban Life, October 1914
- "Negro Colonies in New York City", via Southern Workman, Hampton, Virginia, June 1902 (text)
- "Schoolteacher's Farm in New Jersey", The Craftsman, November 1912
- "The Shop Girls of Paris"
- "Social Work in British Factories", The Craftsman (text, p. 793)
- "What a Hotbed Will Do", House & Garden, November 1916 (text)
- "Work and Pay of the Girl Behind the Counter", The World Today, August 1908
