= Washington Presbyterian Church =

Historic church in Georgia, United States

- U.S. National Register of Historic Places
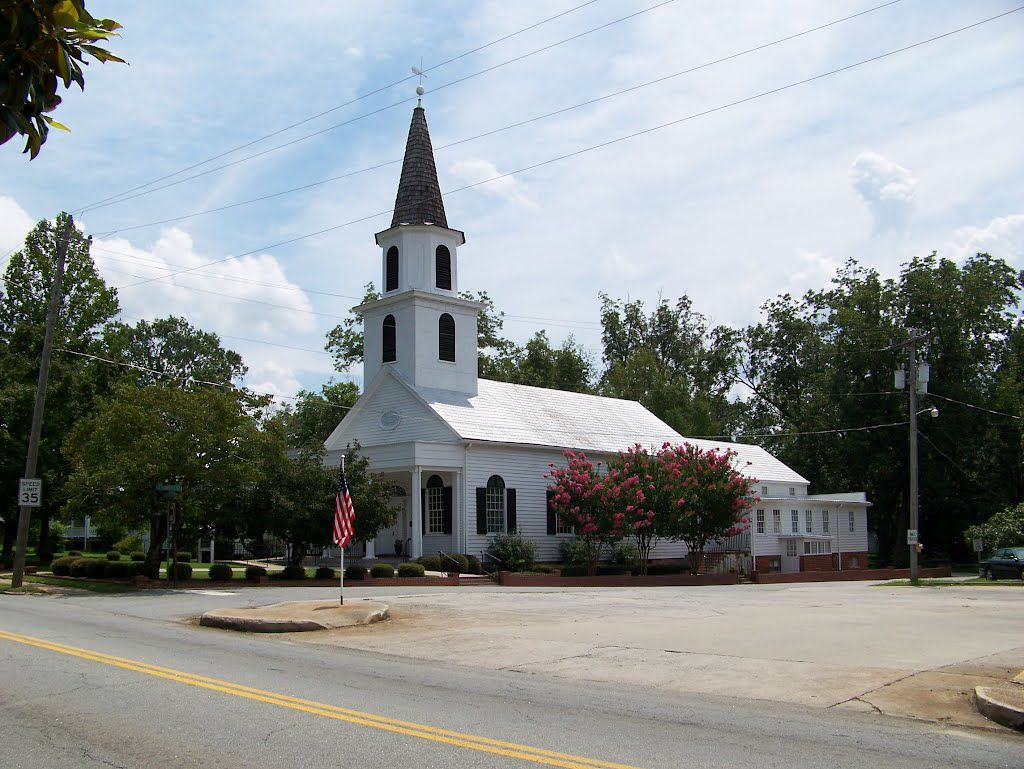
- 2012

- Location within Georgia Location within the United States
- Location: 206 E. Robert Toombs Ave., Washington, Georgia
- Coordinates: 33°44′8″N 82°44′10″W
- Area: less than one acre
- Built: 1890
- Architectural style: New England Wren-Gibbs
- NRHP reference No.: 72000412
- Added to NRHP: April 11, 1972

Washington Presbyterian Church is a historic Presbyterian church at 206 E. Robert Toombs Avenue in Washington, Georgia. The church was founded in 1790, with the building constructed in 1825. It was added to the National Register in 1972.

According to a Georgia state historical marker at the site the church was organized in 1790 as part of the Presbytery of South Carolina. The Rev. John Springer was the first pastor. The South Carolina and Georgia Synod met in Washington in 1821 and organized the Georgia Presbytery. In 1826 the Synod met in the new church building. Pastors have included the Revends Alexander H. Webster, the S. J. Cassels, Francis R. Goulding, John Brown, H. W. Petrie, Nathan Hoyt, J. K. S. Axson, and Thomas Dunwoody. Church members have included Alexander H. Stephens and Duncan G. Campbell.

== Gallery ==
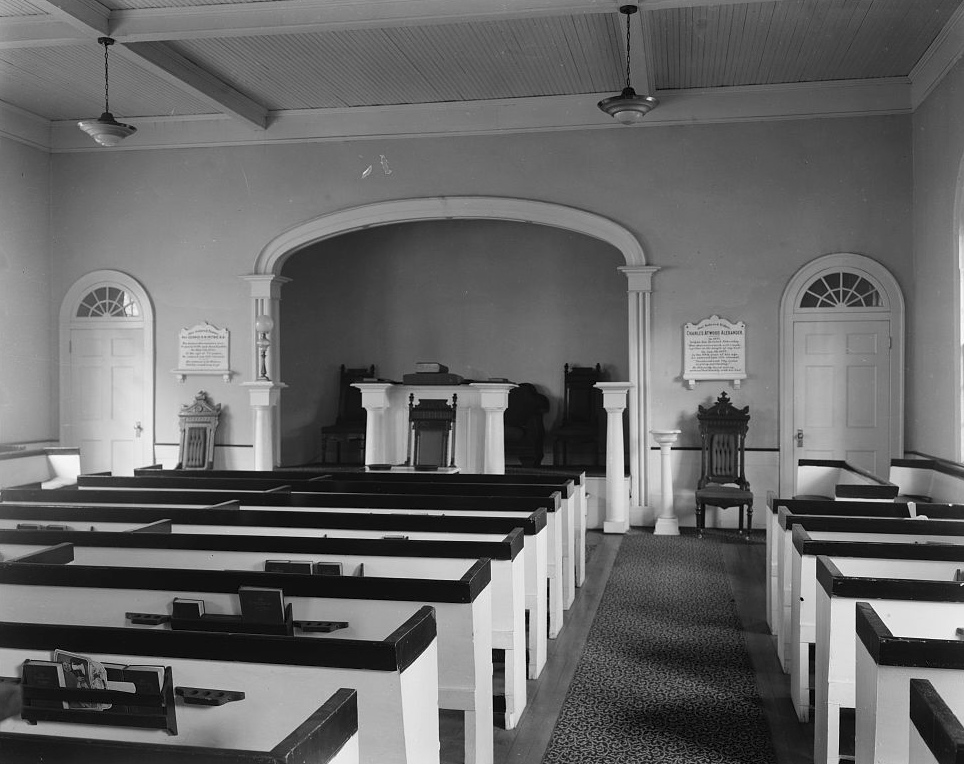
Interior photo by Frances Benjamin Johnston

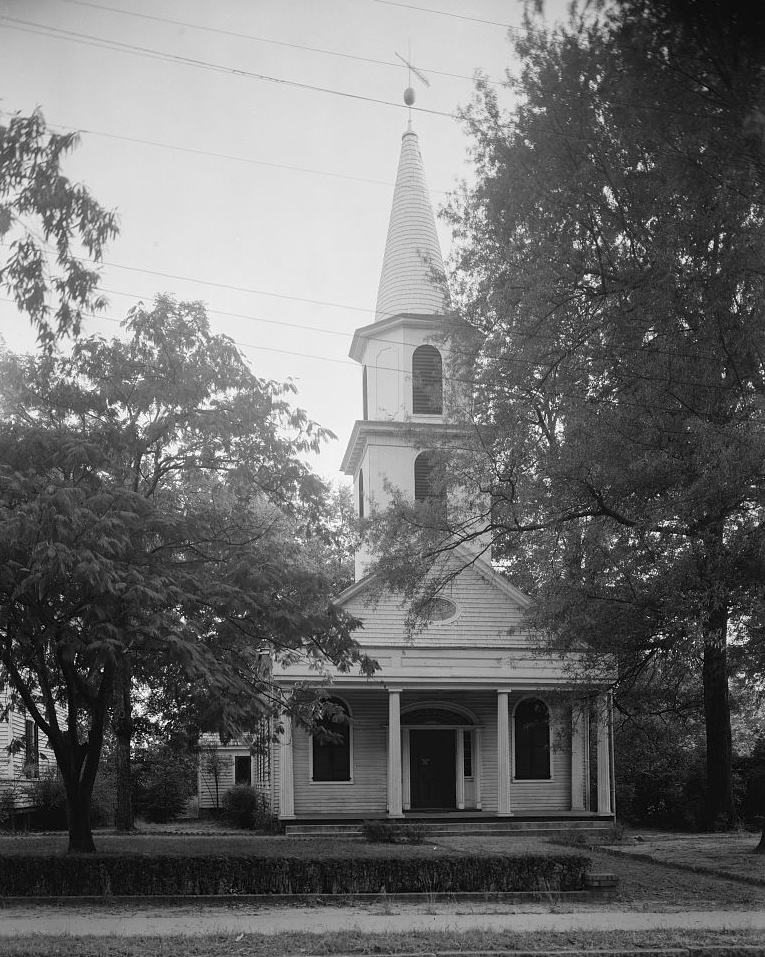
Exterior photo by Frances Benjamin Johnston

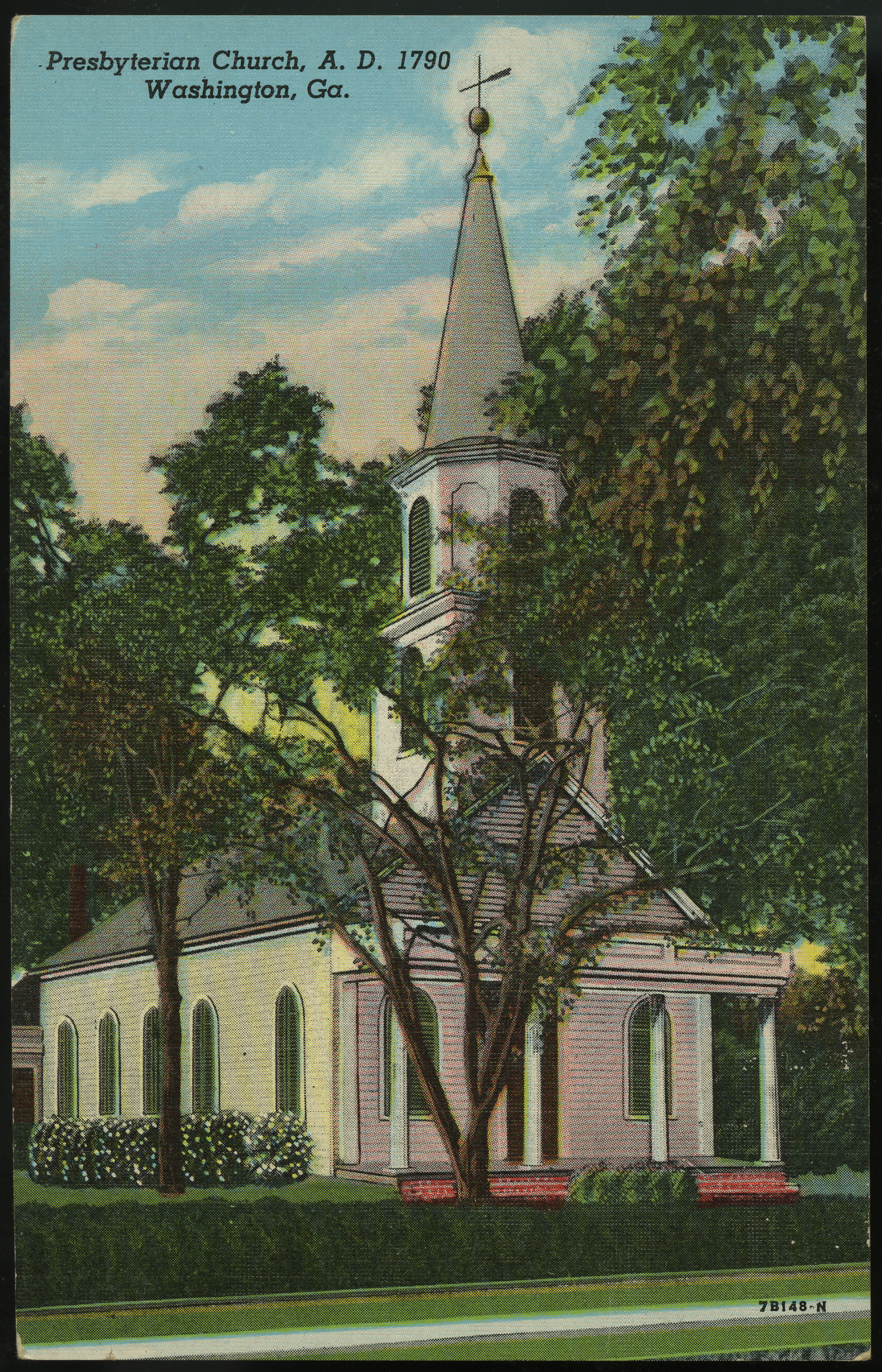
Church on a vintage postcard
