= Washington-Wilkes Historical Museum =

Historic house in Georgia, United States

- U.S. National Register of Historic Places
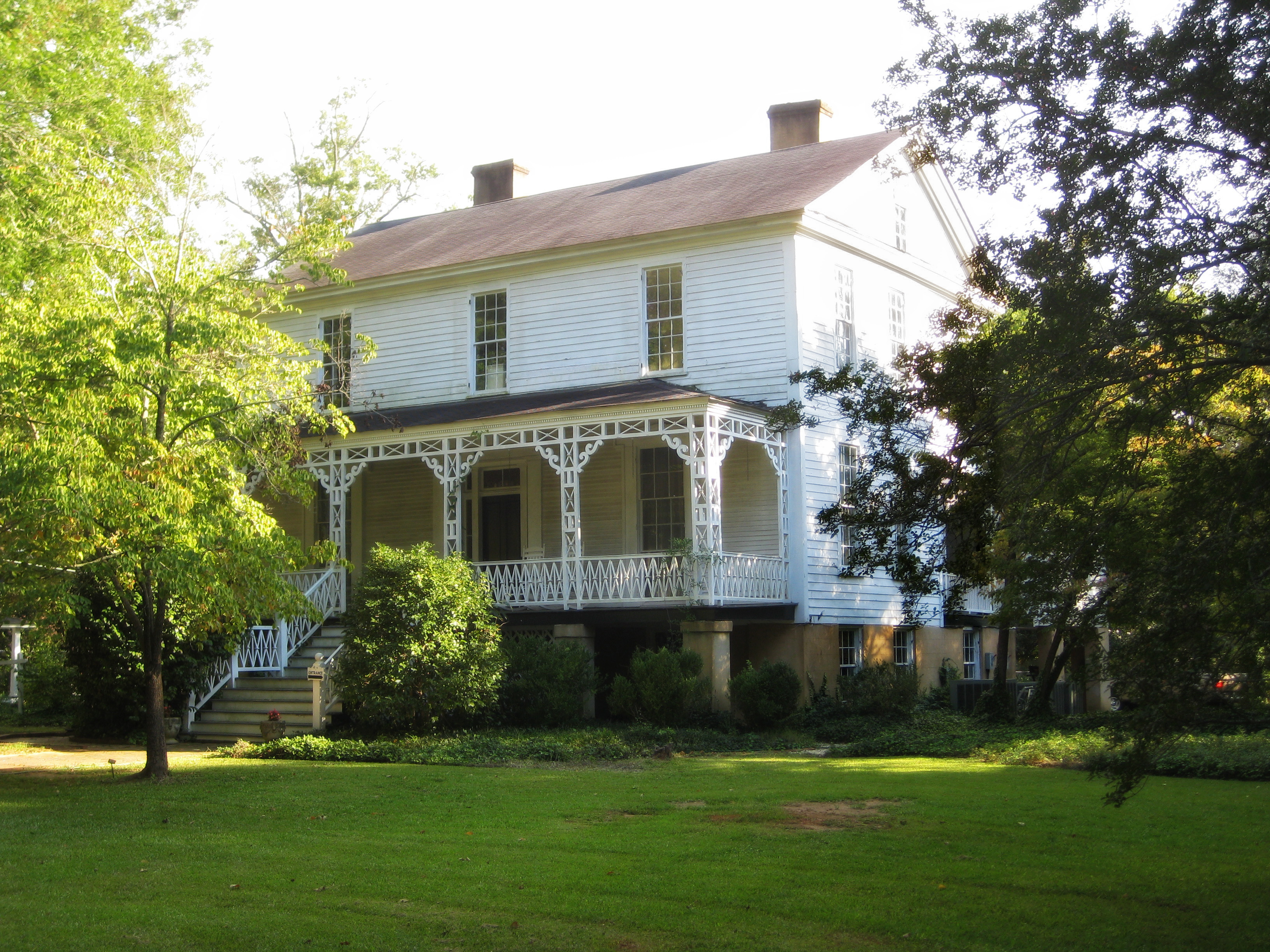

- Location within Georgia Location within the United States
- Location: 308 E. Robert Toombs Ave., Washington, Georgia
- Coordinates: 33°44′7″N 82°44′3″W
- Area: Less than one acre
- Built: 1958
- Architect: Semmes, Albert, Gallatin
- Architectural style: Federal, Downingesque
- NRHP reference No.: 70000227
- Added to NRHP: May 13, 1970

Washington-Wilkes Historical Museum, also known as the Washington Historical Museum, is a historic building in Washington, Georgia. The home was built ca. 1835 by Albert Gallatin Semmes on land owned by American Revolutionary War hero Micajah Williamson. It was added to the National Register of Historic Places on May 13, 1970. It is located at 308 East Robert Toombs Avenue.

== See also ==
- National Register of Historic Places listings in Wilkes County, Georgia
