= Washington, Georgia =

- City
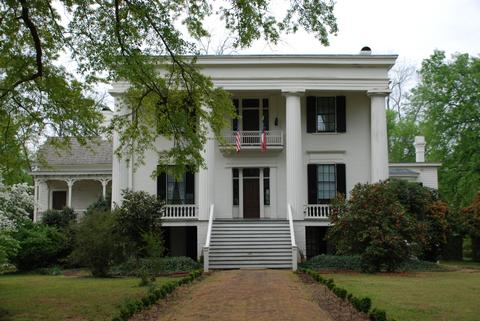
- The Robert Toombs House State Historic Site, also a National Historic Landmark

- Flag

- Location in Wilkes County and the state of Georgia

- Location of Washington in the US
- Coordinates: 33°44′12.5″N 82°44′21.5″W
- Country: United States
- State: Georgia
- County: Wilkes
- Settled: 1774
- Incorporated: 1804
- Founder: Stephen Heard
- Named for: George Washington

Government
  - Mayor: Bruce Baily
  - Council: Washington City Council

Area
  - Total: 7.75 sq mi (20.08 km^{2})
  - Land: 7.70 sq mi (19.94 km^{2})
  - Water: 0.054 sq mi (0.14 km^{2})
- Elevation: 607 ft (185 m)

Population (2020)
  - Total: 3,754
  - Density: 487.7/sq mi (188.29/km^{2})
- Demonym: Washingtonian
- Time zone: UTC-5 (Eastern (EST))
  - Summer (DST): UTC-4 (EDT)
- ZIP code: 30673
- Area codes: 706/762
- FIPS code: 13-80704
- GNIS feature ID: 0356620
- Website: cityofwashingtonga.gov

Washington is a city in and the county seat of Wilkes County, Georgia, United States. Under its original name, Heard's Fort, it was for a brief time during the American Revolutionary War the Georgia state capital. It is noteworthy as the place where the Confederacy voted to dissolve itself, effectively ending the American Civil War.

As of the 2020 census, Washington had a population of 3,754. The city is often referred to as Washington-Wilkes, to distinguish it from other places named Washington.

== History ==
Heard's Fort was established in 1774 by colonist Stephen Heard. The settlement served as the temporary capital of the new state of Georgia from February 3, 1780, until early 1781.

=== American Revolutionary War ===
The Battle of Kettle Creek, one of the most important battles of the American Revolutionary War to be fought in Georgia, was fought on February 14, 1779, in Wilkes County, about eleven miles (18 km) from present-day Washington. The American Patriots were victorious, taking 75 prisoners and killing roughly 70 Loyalists, while losing 32 of their own men.

=== American Civil War ===
As a child, Alexander H. Stephens had studied at the school in Washington presided over by Presbyterian minister Alexander Hamilton Webster. He later became a politician and was elected as vice-president of the Confederacy.

No major battles of the Civil War were fought in or near Washington, but the city is notable as the site where Confederate President Jefferson Davis held his last meeting with his cabinet. On April 3, 1865, with Union troops under General Ulysses S. Grant poised to capture the capital at Richmond, Virginia, Davis escaped for Danville, together with the Confederate cabinet.

After leaving Danville, and continuing south, Davis met with his Cabinet for the last time on May 5, 1865, in Washington, along with a hand-picked escort led by Given Campbell, including his personal body guard, Sgt. Joseph A Higgenbotham Jr., of Amherst/Nelson County, Virginia. The meeting took place at the Heard house (now used as the Georgia Branch Bank Building), with fourteen officials present.

=== Historic sites ===
Several historic sites in Washington are on the National Register of Historic Places, including the Wilkes County Courthouse, the Robert Toombs House State Historic Site, the Washington-Wilkes Historical Museum, the Mary Willis Public Library, Cherry Grove Baptist Church Schoolhouse, and the recently restored historic Fitzpatrick Hotel, built in 1898.

== Geography ==
Washington is located at 33°44′7″N 82°44′29″W (33.735394, −82.741420).

According to the United States Census Bureau, the city has a total area of 7.9 square miles (20 km^{2}), of which 7.8 square miles (20 km^{2}) is land and 0.04 square miles (0.10 km^{2}) (0.25%) is water.

== Demographics ==
Historical population
Census	Pop.	Note	%±
1810	596		—
1820	695		16.6%
1850	462		—
1870	1,506		—
1880	2,199		46.0%
1890	2,631		19.6%
1900	3,300		25.4%
1910	3,065		−7.1%
1920	4,208		37.3%
1930	3,158		−25.0%
1940	3,537		12.0%
1950	3,802		7.5%
1960	4,440		16.8%
1970	4,094		−7.8%
1980	4,662		13.9%
1990	4,279		−8.2%
2000	4,295		0.4%
2010	4,134		−3.7%
2020	3,754		−9.2%
U.S. Decennial Census; 1850-1870 1870-1880; 1890-1910 1920-1930; 1940 1950 1960; 1970 1980 1990; 2000 2010

=== 2020 census ===
As of the 2020 census, there were 3,754 people, 1,646 households, and 904 families residing in the city. The median age was 46.8 years. 20.8% of residents were under the age of 18 and 25.2% were 65 years of age or older. For every 100 females, there were 80.5 males, and for every 100 females age 18 and over there were 77.0 males age 18 and over.

0.0% of residents lived in urban areas, while 100.0% lived in rural areas.

There were 1,978 housing units in Washington. Of all households, 26.7% had children under the age of 18 living in them. Of all households, 30.9% were married-couple households, 19.7% were households with a male householder and no spouse or partner present, and 44.9% were households with a female householder and no spouse or partner present. About 37.1% of all households were made up of individuals and 19.2% had someone living alone who was 65 years of age or older. The homeowner vacancy rate was 1.9% and the rental vacancy rate was 7.7%.

Washington racial composition 2020
Race	Num.	Perc.
White	1,226	32.66%
Black or African American	2,277	60.66%
Native American	12	0.32%
Asian	24	0.64%
Other/Mixed	122	3.25%
Hispanic or Latino	93	2.48%

== Education ==
The Wilkes County School District holds pre-school to grade twelve, and consists of one primary school, one elementary school, a middle school, and a high school. The district has 116 full-time teachers and over 1,858 students.

- Washington-Wilkes Elementary School
- Washington-Wilkes Primary School
- Washington-Wilkes Middle School
- Washington-Wilkes Comprehensive High School

Michelle Smith is the Superintendent of Schools.

== In popular culture ==
One of Washington's most lingering mysteries is that of the lost Confederate gold. As the last recorded location of the remaining Confederate gold, the Washington area is thought to be the site where it is buried. Worth roughly $100,000 when it disappeared in 1865, at 2016 prices its value would be around $3.6 million. The cable television channel A&E produced a documentary focusing on this legend.

== Notable people ==
- Edward Porter Alexander – officer in the U.S. Army, Confederate general in the American Civil War, railroad executive
- James Osgood Andrew – bishop
- Edward McKendree Bounds – clergyman and author
- Lloyd D. Brown – United States Army major general who commanded the 28th Infantry Division in World War II
- Mary Rankin Cranston – librarian, non-fiction writer, social researcher, farmer
- Frank Edwards (blues musician) – blues musician who recorded for OKeh, Regal, and Trix labels
- Ernie Harwell – broadcaster for Major League Baseball, "The Voice of the Tigers"
- Hillary Lindsey – Grammy Award–winning songwriter
- Tom Nash – professional football and baseball player
- Robert Toombs – first Secretary of State of the Confederacy, slaveholder, Confederate general in the Civil War
- William Henry Pope – Texas politician
- Fred Thomas– guitarist for James Brown

== See also ==
- Central Savannah River Area
- Jackson Chapel
- List of municipalities in Georgia (U.S. state)
- List of memorials to George Washington
- National Register of Historic Places listings in Wilkes County, Georgia
