= National Register of Historic Places listings in Oglethorpe County, Georgia =

Location of Oglethorpe County in Georgia

This is a list of properties and districts in Oglethorpe County, Georgia that are listed on the National Register of Historic Places (NRHP).

This National Park Service list is complete through NPS recent listings posted March 21, 2025.

== Current listings ==
	Name on the Register	Image	Date listed	Location	City or town	Description
1	Amis-Elder House	Amis-Elder House	August 2, 1978 (#78000997)	W of Crawford on Elder Rd. 33°49′04″N 83°15′55″W	Crawford	
2	J. L. Bridges Home Place		January 31, 1978 (#78000999)	N of Lexington on GA 22; 33°56′04″N 83°01′28″W	Lexington	
3	Crawford Depot	Crawford Depot	May 27, 1977 (#77000441)	U.S. 78; 33°52′57″N 83°09′22″W	Crawford	
4	Durham Place	Durham Place	June 5, 2017 (#100001020)	261 N. Main St. 33°45′24″N 83°10′28″W	Maxeys	
5	Faust Houses and Outbuildings		February 12, 1980 (#80001217)	NE of Lexington off GA 77; 33°53′46″N 83°00′56″W	Lexington	Buildings and house no longer exist
6	Howard's Covered Bridge	Howard's Covered Bridge	July 1, 1975 (#75000604)	3 mi. SE of Smithonia on SR S2164 over Big Clouds Creek; 33°59′09″N 83°08′01″W	Smithonia	
7	Langston-Daniel House	Langston-Daniel House	January 31, 1978 (#78000998)	5 mi. (8 km) W of Crawford on U.S. 78; 33°53′45″N 83°13′03″W	Crawford	
8	Lexington Historic District	Lexington Historic District	April 13, 1977 (#77000442)	U.S. 78; 33°52′16″N 83°06′36″W	Lexington	
9	Maxeys Historic District		September 2, 2022 (#100008047)	Area surrounding GA 77 (Main St. or Union Point Rd.); 33°45′17″N 83°10′26″W	Maxeys	
10	Philomath Historic District	Philomath Historic District	July 6, 1979 (#79000740)	GA 22; 33°43′19″N 82°59′01″W	Philomath	
11	Smith-Harris House		July 25, 1985 (#85001620)	CR 207; 33°56′57″N 82°57′41″W	Vesta	
12	Smithonia	Smithonia	June 21, 1984 (#84001213)	Address Restricted	Comer	
12	Watson Mill Covered Bridge and Mill Historic District	Watson Mill Covered Bridge and Mill Historic District	September 5, 1991 (#91001147)	Along S. Fork Broad R., Watson Mill State Park; 34°01′34″N 83°04′23″W	Comer	
