= Oglethorpe County School District =

School district in Georgia (U.S. state)

Address
- 735 Athens Road Lexington, Oglethorpe, Georgia, 30648-1911; United States
- Coordinates: 33.889317°N 83.135355°W

District information
- Grades: Pre-kindergarten – 12
- Superintendent: Dr. Phillip Powell
- Accreditations: Cognia; Georgia Accrediting Commission

Students and staff
- Enrollment: 2,127 (October 2026)
- Faculty: 170.40 (FTE)
- Staff: 197.10 (FTE)
- Student–teacher ratio: 12.98

Other information
- Telephone: (706) 743-8128
- Fax: (706) 743-3211
- Website: oglethorpe.k12.ga.us

The Oglethorpe County School District is a public school district in Oglethorpe County, Georgia, United States, based in Lexington.

Its boundaries parallel those of the county. It serves the communities of Arnoldsville, Crawford, Lexington, and Maxeys.

== Schools ==
The Oglethorpe County School District has one elementary school, one middle school, and one high school.

=== Elementary school ===
- Oglethorpe County Elementary School

=== Middle school ===
- Oglethorpe County Middle School

=== High school ===
- Oglethorpe County High School

== Academic performance ==
In 2025, the Oglethorpe County School District earned a College and Career Ready Performance Index (CCRPI) single score of 77.5. Oglethorpe County Middle School scored 81.9, Oglethorpe County Elementary School 79.2, and Oglethorpe County High School 71.6.

== School nutrition ==
Beginning in the 2026–27 school year, the district qualified for the federal Community Eligibility Provision, which provides free breakfast and lunch to all students regardless of income.

== Controversies ==
In 2025, the Oglethorpe Country School District placed a teacher on indefinite leave and was encouraged to resign over comments made on her personal social media in the aftermath of the assassination of Charlie Kirk. In July 2026, the Oglethorpe County School District settled with the teacher for $270,420 for "alleged emotional distress" as well as $17,080 to cover legal fees.
