= Athens–Clarke County metropolitan area =

Coordinates: 33°56′56″N 83°12′50″W

Metropolitan Athens–Clarke County Athens–Clarke County, GA Metropolitan Area
- Metropolitan Statistical Area
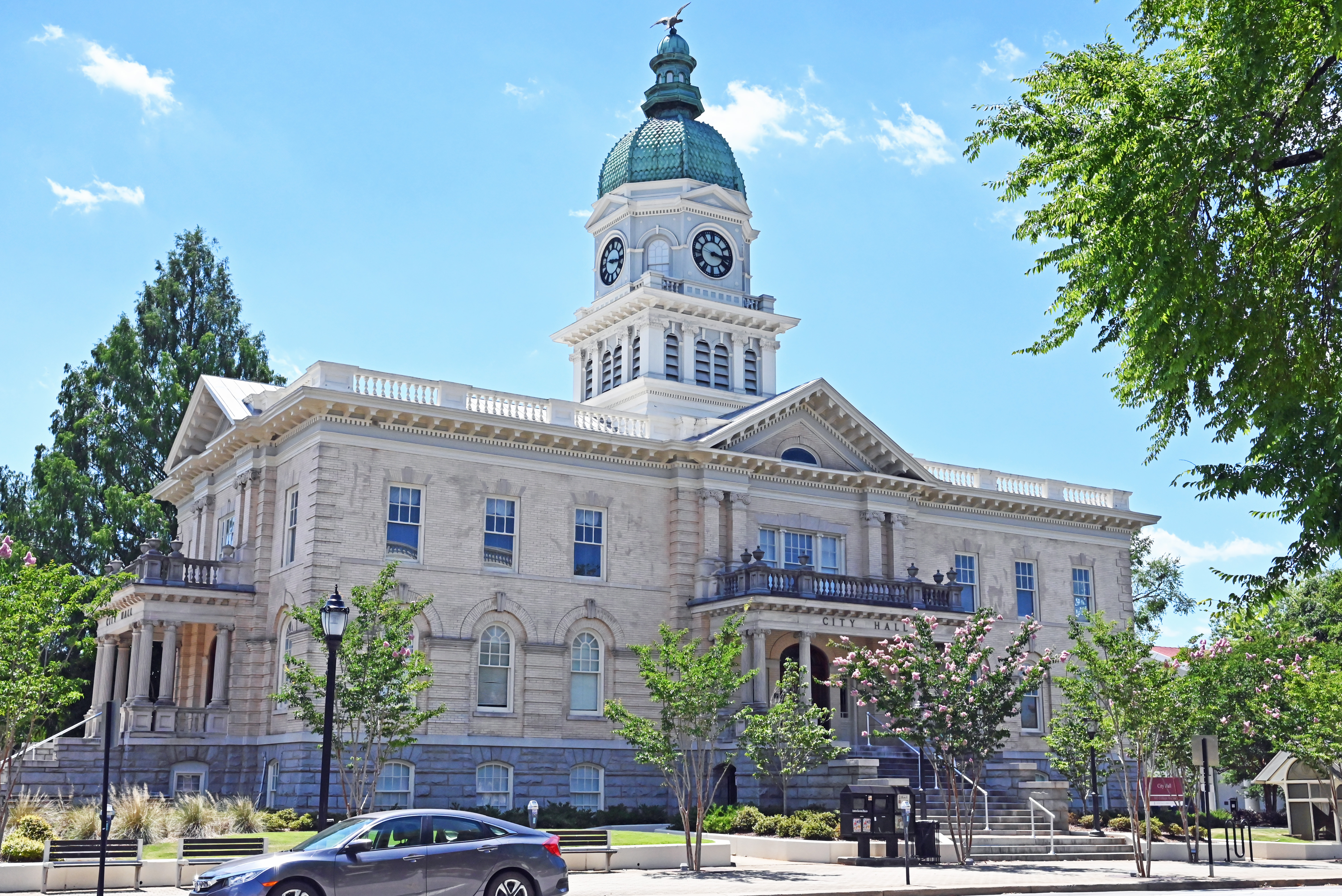
- Athens City Hall
Interactive Map of Athens–Clarke County, GA MSA
City of Athens
Athens–Clarke County, GA MSA
Other Counties in the Atlanta, GA CSA
- Country: United States
- State: Georgia
- Time zone: UTC−5 (EST)
  - Summer (DST): UTC−4 (EDT)
- ZIP codes: 300xx to 303xx
- Area codes: 404/678/470/943 inside the perimeter 770/678/470/943 outside the perimeter

The Athens–Clarke County Metropolitan Statistical Area, as defined by the United States Census Bureau, is an area consisting of four counties – Clarke, Madison, Oconee, and Oglethorpe – in northeastern Georgia, anchored by the city of Athens. As of the 2020 census, the MSA had a population of 215,479.

== Communities ==
- Places with more than 5,000 inhabitants
  - Athens–Clarke County (balance) – Principal city
- Places with 1,000 to 5,000 inhabitants
  - Bogart
  - Comer
  - Watkinsville
  - Winterville
- Places with 500 to 1,000 inhabitants
  - Colbert
  - Crawford
  - Danielsville
  - North High Shoals
- Places with fewer than 500 inhabitants
  - Arnoldsville
  - Bishop
  - Carlton
  - Hull
  - Ila
  - Lexington
  - Maxeys

== Demographics ==
As of the census of 2000, there were 166,079 people, 63,406 households, and 37,885 families residing in the MSA. The racial makeup of the MSA was 73.54% White, 20.48% African American, 0.20% Native American, 2.20% Asian, 0.04% Pacific Islander, 2.32% from other races, and 1.22% from two or more races. Hispanic or Latino of any race were 4.79% of the population.

The median income for a household in the MSA was $38,885, and the median income for a family was $46,685. Males had a median income of $33,441 versus $23,764 for females. The per capita income for the MSA was $18,841.

== See also ==
- Georgia statistical areas
- List of municipalities in Georgia (U.S. state)
