= James Monroe Smith (Georgia planter) =

American politician

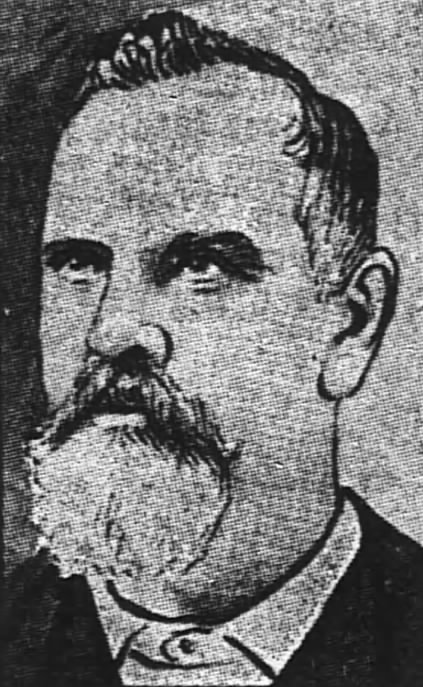

Member of the Georgia State Senate
- In office 1884–1884

Member of the Georgia House of Representatives
- In office 1876–1881
- Constituency: Oglethorpe County

Personal details
- Born: September 18, 1839 Wilkes County, Georgia, United States
- Died: December 11, 1915 (aged 76) Smithonia, Georgia, United States
- Party: Democratic
- Occupation: Planter, legislator

James Monroe Smith (September 18, 1839 – December 11, 1915) was a millionaire planter and state legislator in Georgia, U.S.

== Biography ==
James Monroe Smith was born near Washington, Georgia on September 18, 1839. His plantation, Smithonia, covered square miles. His property included a railroad to connect his farm with the Georgia Railroad. He served in the Georgia State Legislature's house and senate and ran for governor in 1906 but did not win. He was a bachelor. He died on his plantation in Colbert, Georgia on December 11, 1915. After his death his estate was vigorously disputed.

== See also ==
- Howard's Covered Bridge
