= Wilkes County Courthouse =

Wilkes County Courthouse may refer to:

- Wilkes County Courthouse (Georgia), Washington, Georgia
- Wilkes County Courthouse (North Carolina), Wilkesboro, North Carolina
