= Young Leonard Watson =

Florida politician

Young Leonard Watson Sr. (November 7, 1871 - July 7, 1930) was a lawyer and state legislator in Florida. He served in the Florida Senate. A Democrat he represented the 6th District in 1913 and 1915.

He was born on a farm in Lexington, Georgia, the youngest of 12 children. Andrew Jackson Watson was his father. He graduated from the University of Georgia with a B.A. and with a law degree from Mercer University. He partnered with William Wallace Wright.

He married Minnie L. McDaniel (February 14, 1868 - August 14, 1941) and they had three children.
