= 1968 United States presidential election in Georgia =

- November 5, 1968

| Nominee | George Wallace | Richard Nixon | Hubert Humphrey |
| Party | American Independent | Republican | Democratic |
| Home state | Alabama | New York | Minnesota |
| Running mate | Curtis LeMay (Note: The Independent electors were originally pledged to vice presidential candidate S. Marvin Griffin, but they cast their vice presidential ballots for national nominee Curtis LeMay.) | Spiro Agnew | Edmund Muskie |
| Electoral vote | 12 | 0 | 0 |
| Popular vote | 535,550 | 380,111 | 334,440 |
| Percentage | 42.83% | 30.40% | 26.75% |
County results
Wallace
30–40%
40–50%
50–60%
60–70%
70–80%
80–90%
Nixon
30–40%
40–50%
50–60%
Humphrey
30–40%
40–50%
50–60%
President before election
Lyndon B. Johnson
Democratic
Elected President
Richard Nixon
Republican

The 1968 United States presidential election in Georgia was held on November 5, 1968. American Independent Party candidate George Wallace received the most votes, and won all twelve of the state's electoral college votes.

Wallace, who ran a campaign based upon support for segregation, won all but seventeen of the state's 159 counties. Nixon won ten, all either suburban Atlanta, Athens, or Augusta area counties, or historically pro-Union counties of North Georgia. Owing to Wallace's sweep of almost all of the state south of the Unionist North Georgia counties and outside of Atlanta, Cobb and DeKalb counties were two of only three amongst 210 Southern counties carried by Goldwater for the Republicans for the first time ever or since Reconstruction to vote for Nixon.

With 42.83% of the popular vote, Georgia would prove to be Wallace's fourth strongest state after Alabama, Mississippi, and Louisiana.

Among white voters, 51% supported Wallace, 36% supported Nixon, and 13% supported Humphrey.

== Results ==
United States presidential election in Georgia, 1968
| Party | Candidate | Votes | Percentage | Electoral votes |
|---|---|---|---|---|
| American Independent | George Wallace | 535,550 | 42.83% | 12 |
| Republican | Richard Nixon | 380,111 | 30.40% | 0 |
| Democratic | Hubert Humphrey | 334,440 | 26.75% | 0 |
| Write-ins | Eugene McCarthy | 56 | 0.00% | 0 |
| Write-ins | Dick Gregory | 9 | 0.00% | 0 |
| Write-ins | Fred Halstead | 7 | 0.00% | 0 |
| Write-ins | Eldridge Cleaver | 2 | 0.00% | 0 |
| Write-ins | Charlene Mitchell | 2 | 0.00% | 0 |
| Write-ins | Henning A. Blomen | 1 | 0.00% | 0 |
| Totals | | 1,250,266 | 100.00% | 12 |
| Voter turnout | | | | — |

=== Results by county ===
| County | George Wallace American Independent | | Richard Nixon Republican | | Hubert Humphrey Democratic | | Various candidates Write-ins | | Margin | | Total votes cast |
| County | # | % | # | % | # | % | # | % | # | % | Total votes cast |
|---|---|---|---|---|---|---|---|---|---|---|---|
| Appling | 2,678 | 63.26% | 795 | 18.78% | 760 | 17.95% | | | 1,883 | 44.48% | 4,233 |
| Atkinson | 1,554 | 61.47% | 288 | 11.39% | 686 | 27.14% | | | 868 | 34.33% | 2,528 |
| Bacon | 1,935 | 69.11% | 586 | 20.93% | 279 | 9.96% | | | 1,349 | 48.18% | 2,800 |
| Baker | 1,067 | 62.25% | 99 | 5.78% | 548 | 31.97% | | | 519 | 30.28% | 1,714 |
| Baldwin | 2,678 | 37.66% | 2,318 | 32.60% | 2,109 | 29.66% | 6 | 0.10% | 360 | 5.06% | 7,111 |
| Banks | 1,434 | 67.39% | 398 | 18.70% | 296 | 13.91% | | | 1,036 | 48.69% | 2,128 |
| Barrow | 2,731 | 52.79% | 1,372 | 26.52% | 1,070 | 20.68% | | | 1,359 | 26.27% | 5,173 |
| Bartow | 4,052 | 49.11% | 2,045 | 24.78% | 2,149 | 26.05% | 5 | 0.10% | 1,903 | 23.06% | 8,251 |
| Ben Hill | 1,833 | 54.38% | 661 | 19.61% | 876 | 25.99% | 1 | 0.00% | 957 | 28.39% | 3,371 |
| Berrien | 2,810 | 73.41% | 566 | 14.79% | 451 | 11.78% | 1 | 0.00% | 2,244 | 58.62% | 3,828 |
| Bibb | 17,328 | 41.86% | 13,490 | 32.59% | 10,579 | 25.55% | | | 3,838 | 9.27% | 41,397 |
| Bleckley | 2,458 | 68.07% | 756 | 20.94% | 396 | 10.97% | 1 | 0.00% | 1,702 | 47.13% | 3,611 |
| Brantley | 1,709 | 75.52% | 237 | 10.47% | 317 | 14.01% | | | 1,392 | 61.51% | 2,263 |
| Brooks | 2,404 | 63.60% | 589 | 15.58% | 787 | 20.82% | | | 1,617 | 42.78% | 3,780 |
| Bryan | 1,428 | 60.28% | 381 | 16.08% | 560 | 23.64% | | | 868 | 36.64% | 2,369 |
| Bulloch | 3,953 | 50.33% | 2,113 | 26.90% | 1,788 | 22.77% | | | 1,840 | 23.43% | 7,854 |
| Burke | 1,802 | 36.82% | 1,416 | 28.93% | 1,676 | 34.25% | | | 126 | 2.57% | 4,894 |
| Butts | 1,490 | 49.13% | 584 | 19.25% | 959 | 31.62% | | | 531 | 17.51% | 3,033 |
| Calhoun | 979 | 51.26% | 234 | 12.25% | 697 | 36.49% | | | 282 | 14.77% | 1,910 |
| Camden | 1,988 | 51.17% | 751 | 19.33% | 1,146 | 29.50% | | | 842 | 21.67% | 3,885 |
| Candler | 1,624 | 58.78% | 552 | 19.98% | 587 | 21.25% | | | 1,037 | 37.53% | 2,763 |
| Carroll | 6,509 | 54.38% | 3,135 | 26.19% | 2,326 | 19.43% | | | 3,374 | 28.19% | 11,970 |
| Catoosa | 6,449 | 68.66% | 2,043 | 21.75% | 901 | 9.59% | | | 4,406 | 46.91% | 9,393 |
| Charlton | 1,157 | 59.52% | 332 | 17.08% | 455 | 23.41% | | | 702 | 36.11% | 1,944 |
| Chatham | 17,238 | 32.19% | 18,106 | 33.81% | 18,201 | 33.99% | | | -95 | -0.18% | 53,545 |
| Chattahoochee | 303 | 58.16% | 70 | 13.44% | 148 | 28.41% | | | 155 | 29.75% | 521 |
| Chattooga | 3,024 | 56.35% | 1,087 | 20.26% | 1,255 | 23.39% | | | 1,769 | 32.96% | 5,366 |
| Cherokee | 3,351 | 44.91% | 2,675 | 35.85% | 1,434 | 19.22% | 2 | 0.00% | 676 | 9.06% | 7,462 |
| Clarke | 3,452 | 23.31% | 5,800 | 39.17% | 5,543 | 37.43% | 13 | 0.10% | -257 | -1.74% | 14,808 |
| Clay | 608 | 48.33% | 133 | 10.57% | 516 | 41.02% | 1 | 0.10% | 92 | 7.31% | 1,258 |
| Clayton | 11,665 | 49.77% | 8,256 | 35.22% | 3,510 | 14.98% | 7 | 0.00% | 3,409 | 14.55% | 23,438 |
| Clinch | 1,142 | 64.16% | 304 | 17.08% | 334 | 18.76% | | | 808 | 45.40% | 1,780 |
| Cobb | 17,805 | 39.38% | 18,649 | 41.25% | 8,755 | 19.37% | | | -844 | -1.87% | 45,209 |
| Coffee | 3,785 | 59.54% | 1,241 | 19.52% | 1,331 | 20.94% | | | 2,454 | 38.60% | 6,357 |
| Colquitt | 6,325 | 67.82% | 1,882 | 20.18% | 1,119 | 12.00% | | | 4,443 | 47.64% | 9,326 |
| Columbia | 2,207 | 46.48% | 1,636 | 34.46% | 905 | 19.06% | | | 571 | 12.02% | 4,748 |
| Cook | 2,438 | 68.41% | 521 | 14.62% | 603 | 16.92% | 2 | 0.10% | 1,835 | 51.49% | 3,564 |
| Coweta | 3,791 | 50.97% | 2,442 | 32.84% | 1,204 | 16.19% | | | 1,349 | 18.13% | 7,437 |
| Crawford | 886 | 54.66% | 246 | 15.18% | 489 | 30.17% | | | 397 | 24.49% | 1,621 |
| Crisp | 3,271 | 62.63% | 935 | 17.90% | 1,017 | 19.47% | | | 2,254 | 43.16% | 5,223 |
| Dade | 2,460 | 73.32% | 613 | 18.27% | 282 | 8.41% | | | 1,847 | 55.05% | 3,355 |
| Dawson | 845 | 52.81% | 509 | 31.81% | 246 | 15.38% | | | 336 | 21.00% | 1,600 |
| Decatur | 4,576 | 64.87% | 749 | 10.62% | 1,729 | 24.51% | | | 2,847 | 40.36% | 7,054 |
| DeKalb | 23,954 | 22.98% | 52,485 | 50.35% | 27,796 | 26.67% | 2 | 0.00% | -24,689 | -23.68% | 104,237 |
| Dodge | 3,406 | 59.85% | 1,055 | 18.54% | 1,230 | 21.61% | | | 2,176 | 38.24% | 5,691 |
| Dooly | 1,803 | 57.49% | 454 | 14.48% | 879 | 28.03% | | | 924 | 29.46% | 3,136 |
| Dougherty | 9,317 | 49.66% | 5,611 | 29.91% | 3,831 | 20.42% | 3 | 0.00% | 3,706 | 19.75% | 18,762 |
| Douglas | 4,159 | 57.37% | 1,848 | 25.49% | 1,242 | 17.13% | | | 2,311 | 31.88% | 7,249 |
| Early | 2,797 | 71.55% | 327 | 8.37% | 785 | 20.08% | | | 2,012 | 51.47% | 3,909 |
| Echols | 533 | 83.02% | 53 | 8.26% | 56 | 8.72% | | | 477 | 74.30% | 642 |
| Effingham | 2,561 | 64.59% | 769 | 19.39% | 635 | 16.02% | | | 1,792 | 45.20% | 3,965 |
| Elbert | 3,252 | 60.42% | 914 | 16.98% | 1,216 | 22.59% | | | 2,036 | 37.83% | 5,382 |
| Emanuel | 3,307 | 54.11% | 1,297 | 21.22% | 1,508 | 24.67% | | | 1,799 | 29.44% | 6,112 |
| Evans | 1,475 | 58.76% | 543 | 21.63% | 492 | 19.60% | | | 932 | 37.13% | 2,510 |
| Fannin | 1,188 | 20.16% | 3,475 | 58.98% | 1,229 | 20.86% | | | -2,246 | -38.12% | 5,892 |
| Fayette | 1,888 | 57.09% | 867 | 26.22% | 551 | 16.66% | 1 | 0.00% | 1,021 | 30.87% | 3,307 |
| Floyd | 10,001 | 46.49% | 7,470 | 34.72% | 4,036 | 18.76% | 5 | 0.00% | 2,531 | 11.77% | 21,512 |
| Forsyth | 2,397 | 54.07% | 1,389 | 31.33% | 647 | 14.60% | | | 1,008 | 22.74% | 4,433 |
| Franklin | 2,691 | 64.49% | 716 | 17.16% | 766 | 18.36% | | | 1,925 | 46.13% | 4,173 |
| Fulton | 36,995 | 20.66% | 64,153 | 35.83% | 77,847 | 43.47% | 73 | 0.00% | -13,694 | -7.64% | 179,068 |
| Gilmer | 1,259 | 31.30% | 2,074 | 51.55% | 690 | 17.15% | | | -815 | -20.25% | 4,023 |
| Glascock | 733 | 75.96% | 185 | 19.17% | 47 | 4.87% | | | 548 | 56.79% | 965 |
| Glynn | 5,341 | 43.36% | 3,725 | 30.24% | 3,247 | 26.36% | 4 | 0.00% | 1,616 | 13.12% | 12,317 |
| Gordon | 3,077 | 50.83% | 1,815 | 29.99% | 1,161 | 19.18% | | | 1,262 | 20.84% | 6,053 |
| Grady | 3,817 | 65.78% | 561 | 9.67% | 1,425 | 24.56% | | | 2,392 | 41.22% | 5,803 |
| Greene | 1,223 | 34.84% | 652 | 18.58% | 1,635 | 46.58% | | | -412 | -11.74% | 3,510 |
| Gwinnett | 8,909 | 50.94% | 5,350 | 30.59% | 3,226 | 18.45% | 4 | 0.00% | 3,559 | 20.35% | 17,489 |
| Habersham | 3,008 | 52.87% | 1,611 | 28.32% | 1,070 | 18.81% | | | 1,397 | 24.55% | 5,689 |
| Hall | 5,546 | 40.65% | 4,923 | 36.08% | 3,174 | 23.26% | | | 623 | 4.57% | 13,643 |
| Hancock | 1,104 | 30.25% | 381 | 10.44% | 2,165 | 59.32% | | | -1,061 | -29.07% | 3,650 |
| Haralson | 3,251 | 59.40% | 1,451 | 26.51% | 771 | 14.09% | | | 1,800 | 32.89% | 5,473 |
| Harris | 1,851 | 46.93% | 1,021 | 25.89% | 1,072 | 27.18% | | | 779 | 19.75% | 3,944 |
| Hart | 3,208 | 67.20% | 586 | 12.27% | 979 | 20.51% | 1 | 0.00% | 2,229 | 46.69% | 4,774 |
| Heard | 1,153 | 63.63% | 303 | 16.72% | 356 | 19.65% | | | 797 | 43.98% | 1,812 |
| Henry | 3,604 | 45.40% | 2,017 | 25.41% | 2,317 | 29.19% | | | 1,287 | 16.21% | 7,938 |
| Houston | 7,339 | 50.76% | 4,285 | 29.64% | 2,831 | 19.58% | 2 | 0.00% | 3,054 | 21.12% | 14,457 |
| Irwin | 1,955 | 68.36% | 430 | 15.03% | 474 | 16.57% | 1 | 0.00% | 1,481 | 51.79% | 2,860 |
| Jackson | 3,473 | 56.48% | 1,139 | 18.52% | 1,537 | 25.00% | | | 1,936 | 31.48% | 6,149 |
| Jasper | 926 | 41.77% | 456 | 20.57% | 835 | 37.66% | | | 91 | 4.11% | 2,217 |
| Jeff Davis | 1,958 | 67.26% | 577 | 19.82% | 376 | 12.92% | | | 1,381 | 47.44% | 2,911 |
| Jefferson | 2,090 | 40.05% | 1,227 | 23.51% | 1,899 | 36.39% | 2 | 0.00% | 191 | 3.66% | 5,218 |
| Jenkins | 1,249 | 49.43% | 574 | 22.71% | 704 | 27.86% | | | 545 | 21.57% | 2,527 |
| Johnson | 2,041 | 71.16% | 381 | 13.28% | 446 | 15.55% | | | 1,595 | 55.61% | 2,868 |
| Jones | 1,770 | 49.61% | 693 | 19.42% | 1,105 | 30.97% | | | 665 | 18.64% | 3,568 |
| Lamar | 1,440 | 51.34% | 575 | 20.50% | 790 | 28.16% | | | 650 | 23.18% | 2,805 |
| Lanier | 1,024 | 66.41% | 241 | 15.63% | 277 | 17.96% | | | 747 | 48.45% | 1,542 |
| Laurens | 6,649 | 51.79% | 2,738 | 21.33% | 3,451 | 26.88% | | | 3,198 | 24.91% | 12,838 |
| Lee | 1,201 | 53.05% | 389 | 17.18% | 673 | 29.73% | 1 | 0.00% | 528 | 23.32% | 2,264 |
| Liberty | 1,365 | 38.68% | 592 | 16.78% | 1,572 | 44.55% | | | -207 | -5.87% | 3,529 |
| Lincoln | 1,290 | 58.93% | 408 | 18.64% | 491 | 22.43% | | | 799 | 36.50% | 2,189 |
| Long | 1,037 | 58.69% | 156 | 8.83% | 574 | 32.48% | | | 463 | 26.21% | 1,767 |
| Lowndes | 5,679 | 50.91% | 3,073 | 27.55% | 2,402 | 21.53% | | | 2,606 | 23.36% | 11,154 |
| Lumpkin | 1,048 | 49.18% | 687 | 32.24% | 396 | 18.58% | | | 361 | 16.94% | 2,131 |
| McDuffie | 1,709 | 42.46% | 1,324 | 32.89% | 991 | 24.62% | 1 | 0.00% | 385 | 9.57% | 4,025 |
| McIntosh | 841 | 40.07% | 315 | 15.01% | 943 | 44.93% | | | -102 | -4.86% | 2,099 |
| Macon | 1,559 | 50.11% | 598 | 19.22% | 954 | 30.67% | | | 605 | 19.44% | 3,111 |
| Madison | 2,529 | 67.42% | 600 | 16.00% | 621 | 16.56% | 1 | 0.00% | 1,908 | 50.86% | 3,751 |
| Marion | 849 | 66.22% | 186 | 14.51% | 247 | 19.27% | | | 602 | 46.95% | 1,282 |
| Meriwether | 2,571 | 47.17% | 1,120 | 20.55% | 1,760 | 32.29% | | | 811 | 14.88% | 5,451 |
| Miller | 1,862 | 81.60% | 249 | 10.91% | 171 | 7.49% | | | 1,613 | 70.69% | 2,282 |
| Mitchell | 3,647 | 64.73% | 731 | 12.97% | 1,255 | 22.28% | 1 | 0.00% | 2,392 | 42.45% | 5,634 |
| Monroe | 1,422 | 44.16% | 770 | 23.91% | 1,028 | 31.93% | | | 394 | 12.23% | 3,220 |
| Montgomery | 1,433 | 62.63% | 352 | 15.38% | 503 | 21.98% | | | 930 | 40.65% | 2,288 |
| Morgan | 1,391 | 46.68% | 616 | 20.67% | 973 | 32.65% | | | 418 | 14.03% | 2,980 |
| Murray | 1,750 | 45.50% | 1,278 | 33.23% | 818 | 21.27% | | | 472 | 12.27% | 3,846 |
| Muscogee | 15,804 | 45.69% | 11,193 | 32.36% | 7,591 | 21.95% | 2 | 0.00% | 4,611 | 13.33% | 34,590 |
| Newton | 3,017 | 45.20% | 1,660 | 24.87% | 1,996 | 29.90% | 2 | 0.00% | 1,021 | 15.30% | 6,675 |
| Oconee | 1,405 | 55.49% | 713 | 28.16% | 414 | 16.35% | | | 692 | 27.33% | 2,532 |
| Oglethorpe | 1,737 | 66.73% | 383 | 14.71% | 483 | 18.56% | | | 1,254 | 48.17% | 2,603 |
| Paulding | 3,054 | 60.43% | 977 | 19.33% | 1,023 | 20.24% | | | 2,031 | 40.19% | 5,054 |
| Peach | 1,638 | 41.96% | 904 | 23.16% | 1,362 | 34.89% | | | 276 | 7.07% | 3,904 |
| Pickens | 1,392 | 37.34% | 1,659 | 44.50% | 677 | 18.16% | | | -267 | -7.16% | 3,728 |
| Pierce | 2,144 | 66.38% | 579 | 17.93% | 507 | 15.70% | | | 1,565 | 48.45% | 3,230 |
| Pike | 1,442 | 59.61% | 345 | 14.26% | 632 | 26.13% | | | 810 | 33.48% | 2,419 |
| Polk | 4,240 | 53.16% | 1,729 | 21.68% | 2,007 | 25.16% | | | 2,233 | 28.00% | 7,976 |
| Pulaski | 1,569 | 58.59% | 595 | 22.22% | 514 | 19.19% | | | 974 | 36.37% | 2,678 |
| Putnam | 1,177 | 42.91% | 594 | 21.66% | 972 | 35.44% | | | 205 | 7.47% | 2,743 |
| Quitman | 459 | 61.45% | 90 | 12.05% | 198 | 26.51% | | | 261 | 34.94% | 747 |
| Rabun | 1,407 | 52.52% | 680 | 25.38% | 590 | 22.02% | 2 | 0.10% | 727 | 27.14% | 2,679 |
| Randolph | 1,438 | 48.45% | 502 | 16.91% | 1,028 | 34.64% | | | 410 | 13.81% | 2,968 |
| Richmond | 9,532 | 26.26% | 14,993 | 41.30% | 11,770 | 32.42% | 7 | 0.00% | -3,223 | -8.88% | 36,302 |
| Rockdale | 2,215 | 47.91% | 1,195 | 25.85% | 1,213 | 26.24% | | | 1,002 | 21.67% | 4,623 |
| Schley | 619 | 56.68% | 164 | 15.02% | 309 | 28.30% | | | 310 | 28.38% | 1,092 |
| Screven | 1,830 | 44.02% | 916 | 22.04% | 1,411 | 33.94% | | | 419 | 10.08% | 4,157 |
| Seminole | 1,922 | 77.10% | 201 | 8.06% | 369 | 14.80% | 1 | 0.00% | 1,553 | 62.30% | 2,493 |
| Spalding | 4,953 | 45.11% | 3,077 | 28.03% | 2,949 | 26.86% | | | 1,876 | 17.08% | 10,979 |
| Stephens | 2,802 | 54.60% | 1,295 | 25.23% | 1,035 | 20.17% | | | 1,507 | 29.37% | 5,132 |
| Stewart | 932 | 56.35% | 233 | 14.09% | 489 | 29.56% | | | 443 | 26.79% | 1,654 |
| Sumter | 3,489 | 53.08% | 1,383 | 21.04% | 1,701 | 25.88% | | | 1,788 | 27.20% | 6,573 |
| Talbot | 688 | 45.41% | 317 | 20.92% | 510 | 33.66% | | | 178 | 11.75% | 1,515 |
| Taliaferro | 508 | 35.83% | 232 | 16.36% | 678 | 47.81% | | | -170 | -11.98% | 1,418 |
| Tattnall | 3,405 | 65.30% | 852 | 16.34% | 957 | 18.35% | | | 2,448 | 46.95% | 5,214 |
| Taylor | 1,626 | 60.00% | 393 | 14.50% | 691 | 25.50% | | | 935 | 34.50% | 2,710 |
| Telfair | 2,502 | 58.73% | 720 | 16.90% | 1,038 | 24.37% | | | 1,464 | 34.36% | 4,260 |
| Terrell | 1,798 | 49.68% | 545 | 15.06% | 1,275 | 35.23% | 1 | 0.00% | 523 | 14.45% | 3,619 |
| Thomas | 5,039 | 50.98% | 2,261 | 22.87% | 2,583 | 26.13% | 2 | 0.00% | 2,456 | 24.85% | 9,885 |
| Tift | 3,942 | 57.79% | 1,692 | 24.81% | 1,187 | 17.40% | | | 2,250 | 32.98% | 6,821 |
| Toombs | 3,405 | 59.76% | 1,397 | 24.52% | 896 | 15.72% | | | 2,008 | 35.24% | 5,698 |
| Towns | 589 | 20.66% | 1,492 | 52.33% | 770 | 27.01% | | | -722 | -25.32% | 2,851 |
| Treutlen | 1,081 | 57.01% | 474 | 25.00% | 341 | 17.99% | | | 607 | 32.01% | 1,896 |
| Troup | 6,232 | 50.39% | 3,239 | 26.19% | 2,896 | 23.42% | | | 2,993 | 24.20% | 12,367 |
| Turner | 1,845 | 68.95% | 419 | 15.66% | 412 | 15.40% | | | 1,426 | 53.29% | 2,676 |
| Twiggs | 1,167 | 50.41% | 336 | 14.51% | 812 | 35.08% | | | 355 | 15.33% | 2,315 |
| Union | 906 | 29.22% | 1,221 | 39.37% | 974 | 31.41% | | | -247 | -7.96% | 3,101 |
| Upson | 3,599 | 54.75% | 1,494 | 22.73% | 1,480 | 22.52% | | | 2,105 | 32.02% | 6,573 |
| Walker | 8,725 | 60.92% | 3,664 | 25.58% | 1,930 | 13.48% | 2 | 0.00% | 5,061 | 35.34% | 14,321 |
| Walton | 4,047 | 57.83% | 1,399 | 19.99% | 1,552 | 22.18% | | | 2,495 | 35.65% | 6,998 |
| Ware | 5,895 | 57.81% | 2,047 | 20.07% | 2,255 | 22.11% | | | 3,640 | 35.70% | 10,197 |
| Warren | 767 | 43.70% | 406 | 23.13% | 582 | 33.16% | | | 185 | 10.54% | 1,755 |
| Washington | 2,029 | 43.00% | 1,247 | 26.43% | 1,443 | 30.58% | | | 586 | 12.42% | 4,719 |
| Wayne | 3,422 | 59.88% | 1,313 | 22.97% | 980 | 17.15% | | | 2,109 | 36.91% | 5,715 |
| Webster | 494 | 69.28% | 72 | 10.10% | 147 | 20.62% | | | 347 | 48.66% | 713 |
| Wheeler | 934 | 55.83% | 251 | 15.00% | 488 | 29.17% | | | 446 | 26.66% | 1,673 |
| White | 1,157 | 49.13% | 762 | 32.36% | 435 | 18.47% | 1 | 0.00% | 395 | 16.77% | 2,355 |
| Whitfield | 3,954 | 34.36% | 4,828 | 41.95% | 2,723 | 23.66% | 3 | 0.00% | -874 | -7.59% | 11,508 |
| Wilcox | 1,822 | 68.29% | 381 | 14.28% | 465 | 17.43% | | | 1,357 | 50.86% | 2,668 |
| Wilkes | 1,709 | 48.35% | 873 | 24.70% | 953 | 26.96% | | | 756 | 21.39% | 3,535 |
| Wilkinson | 1,870 | 55.26% | 685 | 20.24% | 829 | 24.50% | | | 1,041 | 30.76% | 3,384 |
| Worth | 3,049 | 69.74% | 603 | 13.79% | 719 | 16.45% | 1 | 0.00% | 2,330 | 53.29% | 4,372 |
| Totals | 535,550 | 42.83% | 380,111 | 30.40% | 334,440 | 26.75% | 165 | 0.01% | 155,439 | 12.43% | 1,250,266 |

==== Counties that flipped from Republican to American Independent ====
- Baker
- Catoosa
- Calhoun
- Clay
- Clayton
- Columbia
- Crawford
- Dooly
- Dade
- Douglas
- Fayette
- Gwinnett
- Lee
- Lowndes
- Macon
- Marion
- Peach
- Quitman
- Stewart
- Talbot
- Twiggs
- Walker
- Warren
- Webster
- Wilkinson
- Appling
- Atkinson
- Bacon
- Baldwin
- Barrow
- Ben Hill
- Berrien
- Bleckley
- Brantley
- Brooks
- Bryan
- Burke
- Bulloch
- Camden
- Candler
- Carroll
- Charlton
- Chattahoochee
- Cherokee
- Clinch
- Coffee
- Colquitt
- Cook
- Crisp
- Decatur
- Dodge
- Dougherty
- Early
- Echols
- Effingham
- Emanuel
- Evans
- Floyd
- Glascock
- Glynn
- Grady
- Haralson
- Harris
- Houston
- Irwin
- Jasper
- Jeff Davis
- Jefferson
- Jenkins
- Johnson
- Jones
- Lamar
- Lanier
- Laurens
- Lincoln
- McDuffie
- Miller
- Monroe
- Montgomery
- Muscogee
- Oconee
- Oglethorpe
- Pierce
- Pike
- Pulaski
- Putnam
- Randolph
- Schley
- Screven
- Seminole
- Sumter
- Tattnall
- Terrell
- Thomas
- Tift
- Toombs
- Turner
- Walton
- Wayne
- Wilcox
- Wilkes
- Worth
- Bibb
- Taylor
- Telfair
- Washington

==== Counties that flipped from Democratic to American Independent ====
- Banks
- Bartow
- Butts
- Chattooga
- Coweta
- Dawson
- Elbert
- Forsyth
- Franklin
- Gordon
- Habersham
- Hall
- Hart
- Heard
- Henry
- Jackson
- Long
- Lumpkin
- Madison
- Morgan
- Murray
- Meriwether
- Newton
- Pualding
- Polk
- Spalding
- Stephens
- Rabun
- Rockdale
- Treutlen
- Troup
- Upson
- Ware
- Wheeler
- White

==== Counties that flipped from Republican to Democratic ====
- Chatham

==== Counties that flipped from Democratic to Republican ====
- Clarke
- Towns
- Union
- Whitfield

== Works cited ==
- Black, Earl; Black, Merle (1992). The Vital South: How Presidents Are Elected. Harvard University Press. ISBN 0674941306.
