= Wilkes County Schools =

Wilkes County Schools is the name of two school districts in the United States:

- Wilkes County Schools (Georgia)
- Wilkes County Schools (North Carolina)
