= Crawford Depot =

Crawford Depot may refer to a historic location in the United States:

- Crawford Depot (Crawford, Georgia), listed on the National Register of Historic Places in Georgia
- Crawford Depot (Carroll, New Hampshire), listed on the NRHP in New Hampshire
