= Howard's Covered Bridge =

- U.S. National Register of Historic Places
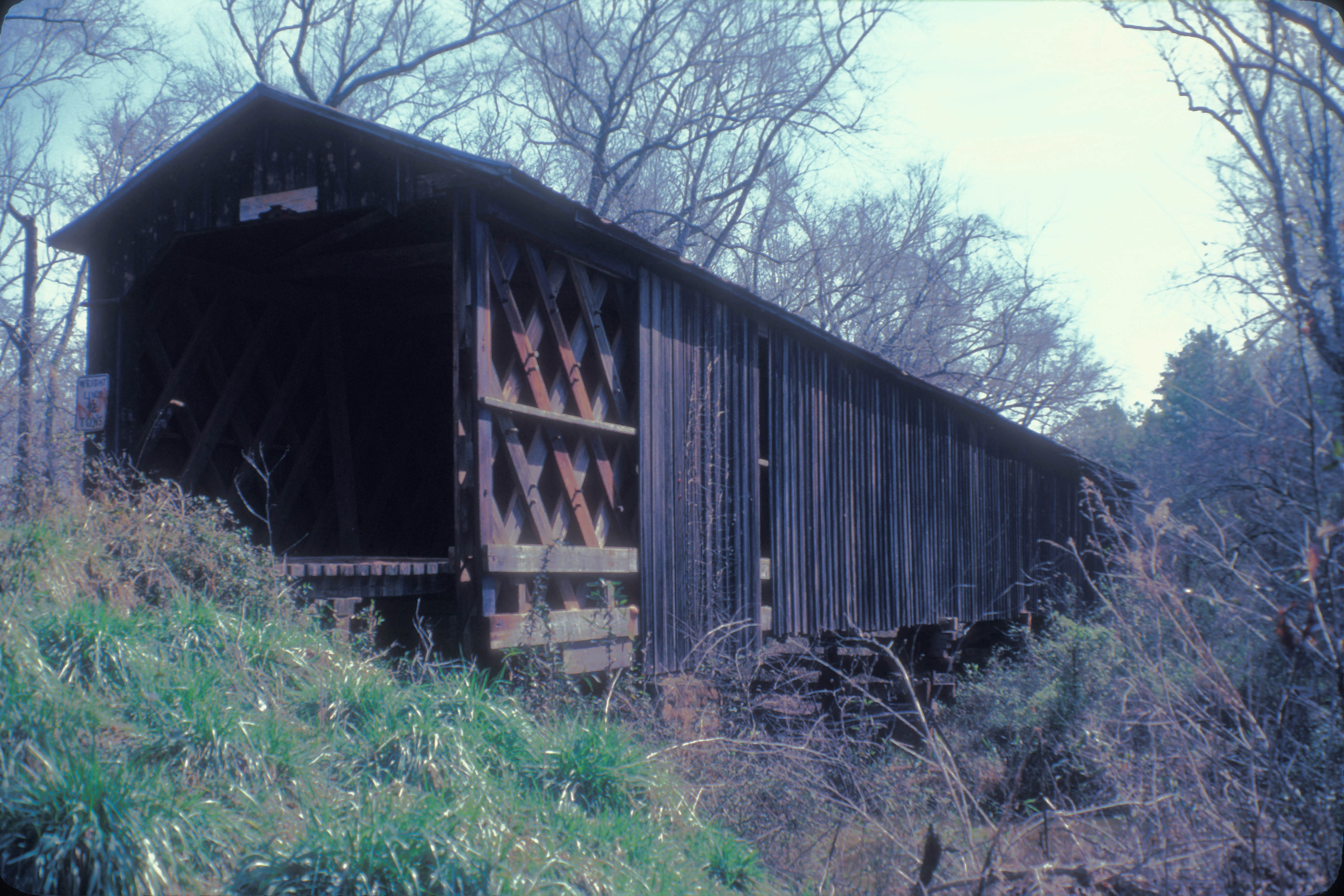

- Location within Georgia Location within the United States
- Nearest city: Smithonia, Georgia
- Coordinates: 33°59′9″N 83°8′1″W
- Area: less than one acre
- Built: 1905
- Built by: Mr. Hunt (supervisor), convict labor
- Architectural style: Town lattice
- NRHP reference No.: 75000604
- Added to NRHP: July 1, 1975

Howard's Covered Bridge is a historic covered bridge outside of Smithonia in Oglethorpe County, Georgia, United States. It was added to the National Register of Historic Places on July 1, 1975. The bridge is located 3 miles southeast of Smithonia on SR S2164. The bridge was built in 1905 in a Town lattice design and is 168 feet (51 m) long. The span travels over Big Clouds Creek. The site is marked by a historical marker posted by the Georgia Historical Society. The bridge was named for the pioneer family that settled in the area in the late 1700s. It was built with convict labor and is fastened with wooden trunnels. The timber used was transported on the Smithonia and Dunlap Railroad, connecting James Monroe Smith's farm with the Georgia Railroad at Dunlap, Georgia.

The site's historical marker is at the southern end of Chandler Silver Road at the intersection with Cloud's Creek Road, 1.3 miles west of the Cloud's Creek Baptist Church marker.

== See also ==
- National Register of Historic Places listings in Oglethorpe County, Georgia
- List of covered bridges in Georgia (U.S. state)
