= Shaking Rock Park =

Park in Georgia, United States

Coordinates: 33.86722°N 83.11819°W

Shaking Rock Park is located in Oglethorpe County, off Highway 78 in Lexington, Georgia.

Shaking Rock

Before being settled by American pioneers and European emigrants, the area around Shaking Rock was a camping ground of the Cherokee and Creek Indians.

Shaking Rock derived its name from a 27-ton boulder that was so perfectly balanced atop a granite outcrop that it could be moved by the pressure of a hand. Over time, the elements have disturbed this balance to a degree that the boulder can no longer be moved. Reportedly, the "shaking rock" was knocked to the earth by the 1886 Charleston earthquake. Other huge natural granite outcroppings in unusual shapes are scattered throughout while a picnic area active beaver pond, and several nature trails with identified trees enhance the park.

The park was established in 1968. Mrs. Andrew Cobb Erwin, Mrs. Sallie McWhorter Hawken and Mr. Thurmond McWhorter (three heirs of the park's former owner, Judge Hamilton McWhorter) donated the land for the park to Oglethorpe County at the request of the Lexington Women's Club.

Welcome Sign

Since establishment of the park, Mr. Bobby Maxwell has served as custodian.

In recent years, there has been a surge of college students from the University of Georgia, as well as other rock-climbing enthusiasts who have ventured to climb the boulders at Shaking Rock Park.
