= Crawford station (Georgia) =

- Crawford Depot
- U.S. National Register of Historic Places
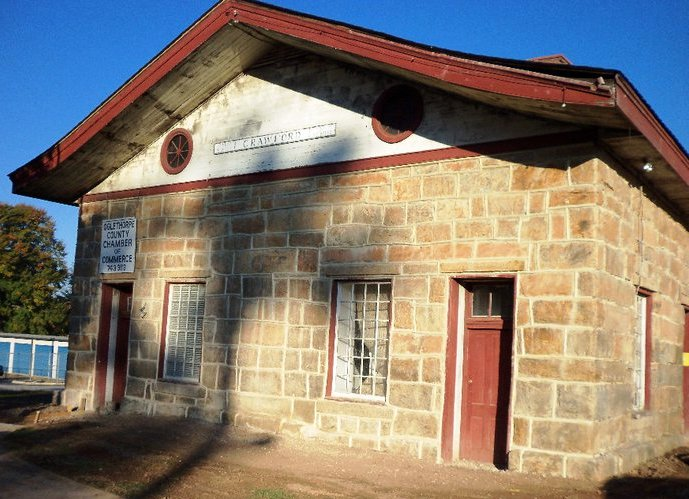

- Location within Georgia Location within the United States
- Location: U.S. 78, Crawford, Georgia
- Coordinates: 33°52′57″N 83°9′22″W
- Area: 1.1 acres (0.45 ha)
- Built: 1848
- Built by: Georgia Railroad Company
- NRHP reference No.: 77000441
- Added to NRHP: May 27, 1977

Crawford Depot is a historic train station in Crawford, Oglethorpe County, Georgia. It was added to the National Register of Historic Places on May 27, 1977. The depot is located on U.S. 78; it dates from ca. 1848 and is used to house the Oglethorpe County Chamber of Commerce.

According to local history, the building was constructed from Lithonia granite crossties which had been used by the Georgia Railroad. It's a rare example of a stone depot built by the Georgia Railroad.

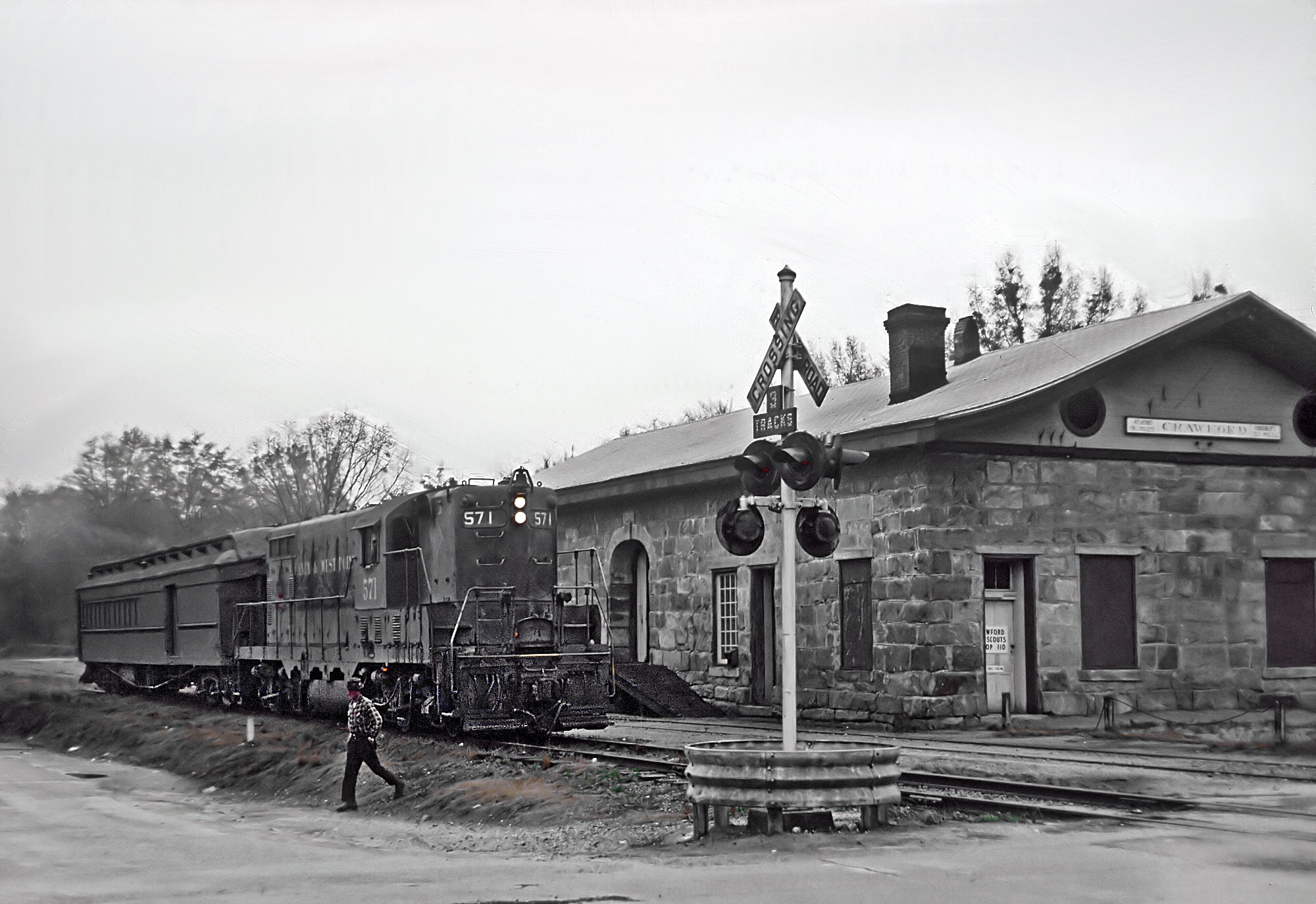
The depot, when it was still active in 1967, with an Atlanta and West Point Railroad train on the tracks.

It is a one-story granite building approximately 41 feet (12 m) by 91 feet (28 m) in dimension. It is the only surviving stone depot building of the Georgia Railroad.

== See also ==
- National Register of Historic Places listings in Oglethorpe County, Georgia
