= Wilkes County School District =

School district in Georgia (U.S. state)

Address
- 313 North Alexander Avenue Washington, Georgia, 30673-5908; United States
- Coordinates: 33.739001°N 82.736397°W

District information
- Grades: Pre-school - 12
- Superintendent: Dr. Rosemary W. Caddell
- Accreditation(s): Southern Association of Colleges and Schools; Georgia Accrediting Commission

Students and staff
- Enrollment: 1,858
- Faculty: 116

Other information
- Telephone: (706) 678-2718
- Fax: (706) 678-3799
- Website: www.wilkes.k12.ga.us

The Wilkes County School District (also called "Wilkes County Schools") is a public school district in Wilkes County, Georgia, USA, based in Washington, Georgia. It serves the communities of Rayle, Tignall, and Washington.

== Schools ==
The Wilkes County School District has two elementary schools, one middle school, and one high school.

=== Elementary schools ===
- Washington-Wilkes Elementary School
- Washington-Wilkes Primary School

=== Middle school ===
- Washington-Wilkes Middle School

=== High school ===
- Washington-Wilkes Comprehensive High School
