= Point Peter, Georgia =

Unincorporated community in Georgia, United States

Coordinates: 33°59′45″N 83°00′48″W

Point Peter is an unincorporated community in Oglethorpe County, in the U.S. state of Georgia.

== History ==
A post office called Point Peter was established in 1849, and remained in operation until 1957. The community was named after one "Pint Peter", a whiskey peddler; a postal error accounts for the error in spelling, which was never corrected. Older variant names are "Glade" and "The Glade".
