= Washington-Wilkes Comprehensive High School =

School district in Georgia, United States

Coordinates: 33.7602°N 82.7342°W

Location
- 1182 Tignall Road; Washington, Georgia 30673; United States

Information
- School type: High school
- School district: Wilkes County School District
- Website: https://www.wilkes.k12.ga.us/o/wwchs

Washington-Wilkes Comprehensive High School is a public high school in Wilkes County, Georgia, United States. It is located at 1182 Tignall Road.

The school's teams are known as the Tigers.
