= Oglethorpe County High School =

Public high school in Lexington, Georgia, United States

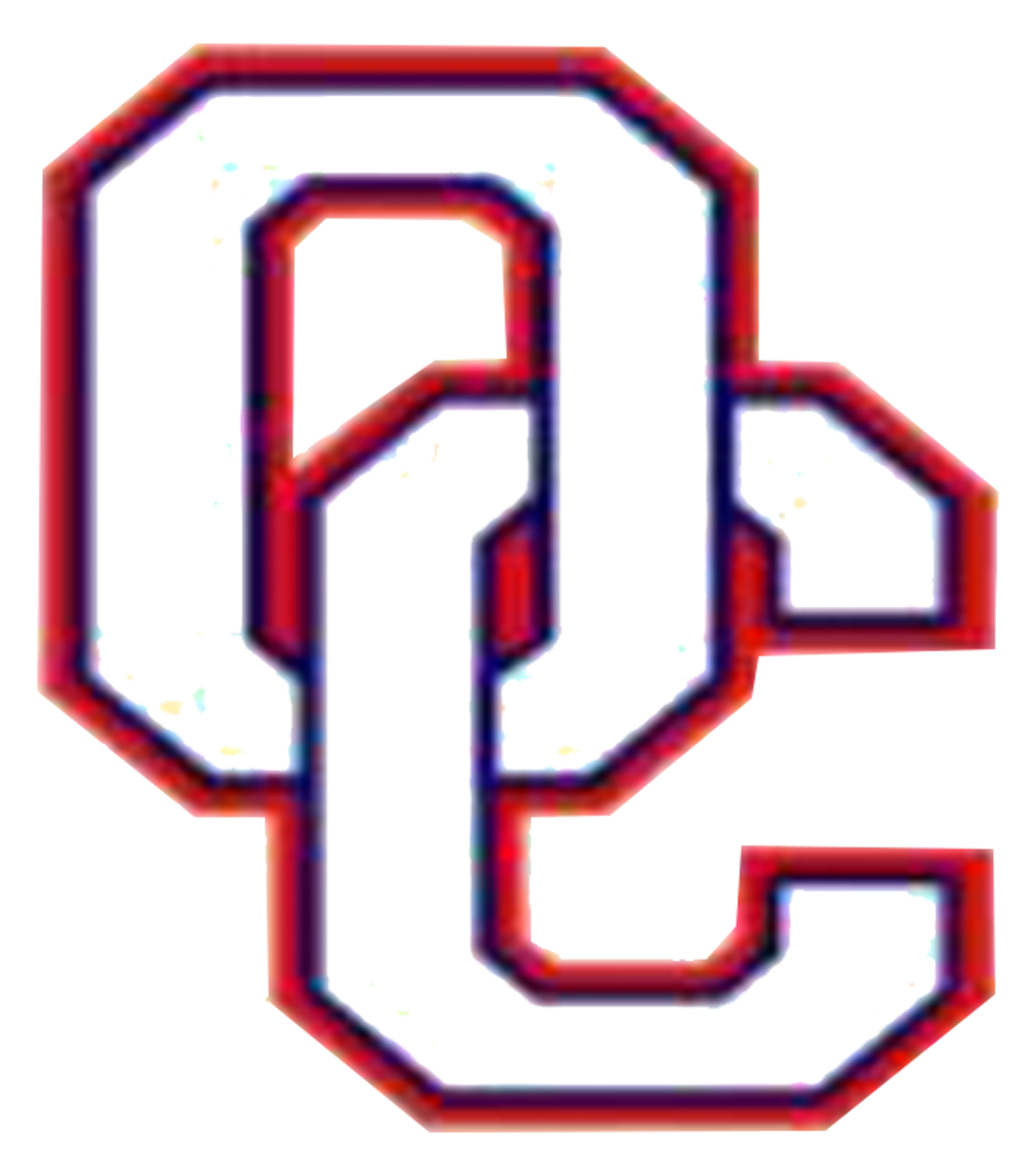

Location
- 749 Athens Rd; Lexintgon, Georgia 30648; United States; 33°53′04″N 83°07′30″W

Information
- Type: Public high school
- Established: 1924; 102 years ago
- School district: Oglethorpe County School District
- NCES District ID: 130399001468
- Principal: Bill Sampson
- Staff: 42.80
- Grades: 9–12
- Enrollment: 679 (2023-2024)
- Student to teacher ratio: 15.86
- Campus type: Rural
- Colors: Red, White, and Blue
- Nickname: Patriots
- Accreditation: Southern Association of Colleges and Schools
- Newspaper: The Patriot Press
- Yearbook: Stars and Stripes
- Website: ochs.oglethorpe.k12.ga.us

Oglethorpe County High School is an American four-year comprehensive high school in Lexington, Georgia. It is the only high school in the Oglethorpe County School District, and opened in 1924 as a public school.

== History ==
Oglethorpe County High School was preceded by the Meson Academy, which opened in Lexington in 1806 and ran as an academy for school children with separate male and female departments until its closure in 1918. After the academy's closure a local group called the Lexington Woman's Club which had formed in 1916, lobbied for the creation of a new school in its place. Because of their efforts, the Meson Academy was reopened as Oglethorpe County High School in 1924–1925. The reopening of the school included adding a playground and repainting of the interior of the school in 1924, and adding 100 additional mahogany opera chairs in the school's auditorium, which was used by the Lexington Woman's Club for meetings.

The Lexington Women's Club continued their involvement with Oglethorpe County High School for several years, including bestowing honorary membership to teachers of the school and fundraising for school equipment.

The school started a joint program with the University of Georgia's College of Education in the late 1980s called OH-STAY (short for Oglethorpe High STAY) to try to tackle the school's high dropout rate. The program used a $55,000 grant from the Metropolitan Life Foundation to pay for a student advocate who helped keep students in school and provided tutoring, while also training teachers to look for signs of and preemptively address potential dropouts. The school had 65 students dropout in 1985, compared to 4 in 1987, with several students returning to complete their education. As a result of the program the school's 43% dropout rate in the 1985–86 school year dropped to 17% by the end of the 1987–88 school year.

== Enrollment ==
| enrollment = 632 | enrollment_as_of = October 2026

In 2025, the Oglethorpe County School District earned a College and Career Ready Performance Index (CCRPI) single score of 77.5. Oglethorpe County Middle School scored 81.9, Oglethorpe County Elementary School 79.2, and Oglethorpe County High School 71.6.

In the 2026–27 school year, the school system qualified for the federal Community Eligibility Provision, which provides free breakfast and lunch to all students regardless of income.

== Sports ==
Oglethorpe County High School is part of the Georgia High School Association's GHSA Class A Division I Region 5.
