= Smithonia, Georgia =

Unincorporated community in Georgia, U.S.

Coordinates: 34°00′10″N 83°10′34″W

- Smithonia
- U.S. National Register of Historic Places
- U.S. Historic district
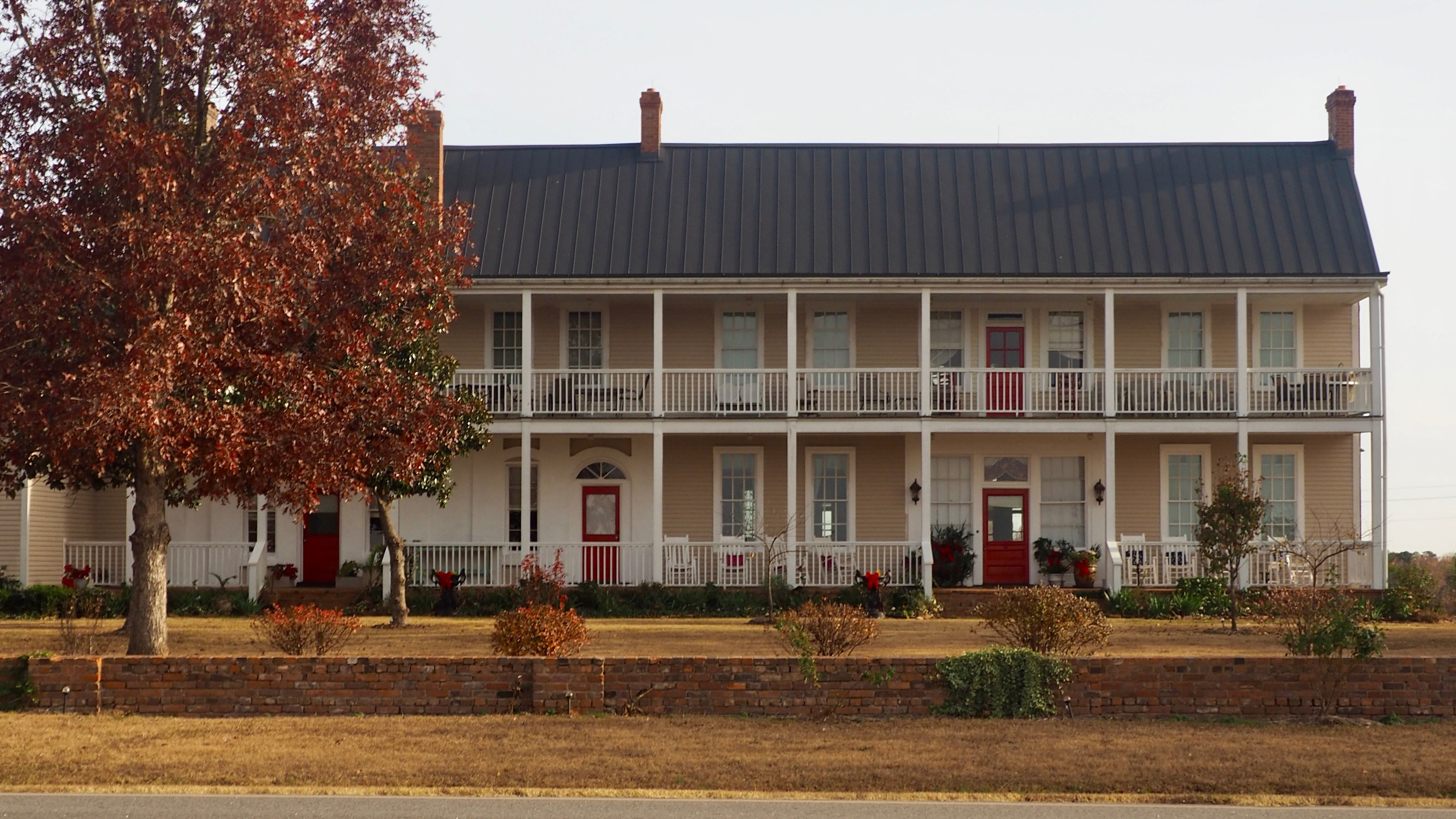

- Location within Georgia Location within the United States
- Nearest city: Comer, Georgia
- Built: 1866
- Architect: James Monroe Smith (Georgia planter)
- Architectural style: Plantation Plain
- NRHP reference No.: 84001213
- Added to NRHP: June 21, 1984

Smithonia is an unincorporated community in Oglethorpe County, Georgia, United States, at the intersection of Crawford-Smithonia and Smithonia Roads. It is also the name of a historical plantation listed on the National Register of Historic Places in 1984.

Smithonia is reported in the database of the NRHP as the nearest community to Howard's Covered Bridge, three miles away. The nearest city is Comer.

Smithonia, near Athens, was founded and named by Georgia State Senator James Monroe Smith. The once small farm became the state's largest plantation.

== History ==
The land was part of Georgia agricultural tycoon and state legislator Smith's property holdings. It was built in 1866 in a "Plantation Plain" architectural style. The Smith and Dunlap Railroad connected the property with the Georgia Railroad at Dunlap, Georgia. The rail line was also used to construct Howard's Covered Bridge.

James M. Smith held hundreds of debt slaves on a farm that stretched thirty miles from the town he named after himself. He became a major buyer of convicts soon after Georgia's Reconstruction government was toppled by a campaign of voter fraud and Ku Klux Klan violence. For workers he relied on an army of convict slaves, including many African Americans he had owned before the war or their descendants. In the post-Civil War economy, Smith used the labor of the debt and convict slaves to grow a small farm into the state's largest plantation. If workers tried to flee, Smith relied on deputy sheriffs to recapture them and his own overseers to inflict brutal punishments. "They had dogs to trail them with so they always got caught, and then the whipping boss beat them almost to death," John Hill said. "It was awful to hear them hollering and begging for mercy. If they hollered 'Lord have mercy!' Marse Jim didn't hear them, but if they cried, "Marse Jim have mercy!' then he made them stop the beating. He say, 'The Lord rule Heaven, but Jim Smith ruled the earth.'"
