= Wilkes County, Georgia =

County in Georgia, United States

- County
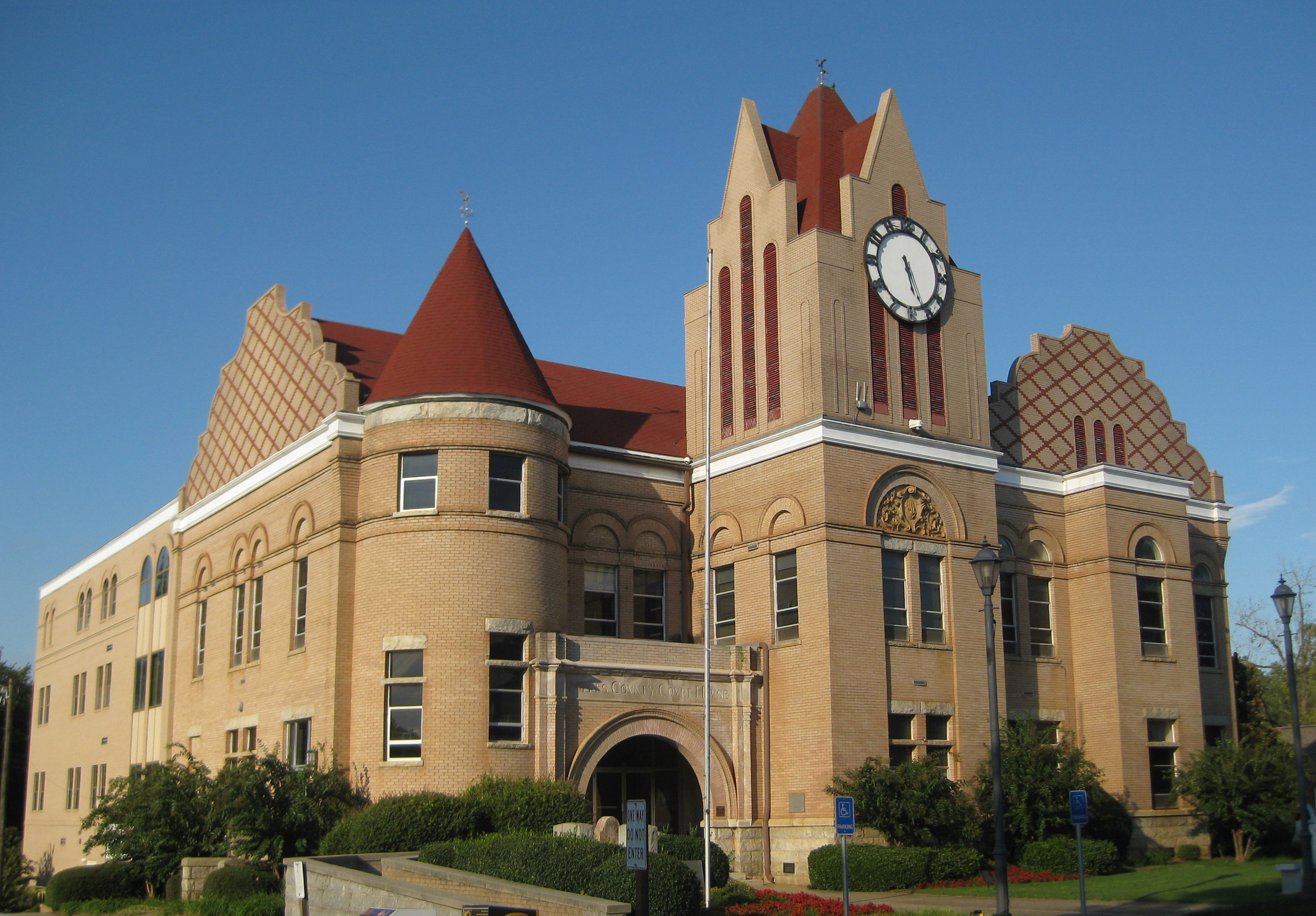
- Wilkes County Courthouse in Washington

- Location within the U.S. state of Georgia
- Coordinates: 33°47′N 82°44′W
- Country: United States
- State: Georgia
- Founded: February 5, 1777; 249 years ago
- Named for: John Wilkes
- Seat: Washington
- Largest city: Washington

Area
  - Total: 474 sq mi (1,230 km^{2})
  - Land: 469 sq mi (1,210 km^{2})
  - Water: 4.6 sq mi (12 km^{2}) 1.0%

Population (2020)
  - Total: 9,565
  - Estimate (2025): 9,540 ▼
  - Density: 20/sq mi (7.7/km^{2})
- Time zone: UTC−5 (Eastern)
  - Summer (DST): UTC−4 (EDT)
- Congressional districts: 10th, 12th
- Website: www.wilkescountyga.org

Wilkes County is a county located in the east central portion of the U.S. state of Georgia. As of the 2020 census, the population was 9,565. The county seat is the city of Washington.

Referred to as "Washington-Wilkes", the county seat and county are commonly treated as a single entity by locals, including the area's historical society and the Chamber of Commerce. It is part of the Central Savannah River Area (CSRA).

== History ==
Wilkes County, named for British politician and supporter of American independence, John Wilkes, is considered Georgia's first county established by European Americans; it was the first of eight original counties created in the first state constitution on February 5, 1777. The other seven counties were organized from existing colonial parishes.

Wilkes was unique in being made up of land ceded in 1773 by the indigenous Creek and Cherokee Native American nations in their respective Treaties of Augusta. Its location was important due to its close proximity to the Atlantic seaboard fall line, and hence access to water power.

Between 1790 and 1854, Wilkes County's area was reduced as it was divided to organize new counties following the growth of population in the area. The Georgia legislature formed the counties of Elbert, Oglethorpe, and Lincoln entirely from portions of Wilkes County. Wilkes also contributed part of the lands used in the creation of Madison, Warren, Taliaferro, Hart, McDuffie, and Greene Counties.

Wilkes County was the site of one of the most important battles of the American Revolutionary War to be fought in Georgia. During the Battle of Kettle Creek in 1779, the American Patriot forces were victorious over British Loyalists.

During the eighteenth and nineteenth centuries, colonists depended on enslaved African-American workers and whites to clear land, develop plantations, and cultivate and process cotton in this area. Long-staple cotton would not grow in this upland areas and short-staple cotton was originally too labor-intensive to be profitable.

In 1793, American Eli Whitney perfected his revolutionary invention of the cotton gin at Mount Pleasant, a cotton plantation east of Washington. It allowed mechanization of the processing of short-staple cotton, making its cultivation profitable in the upland areas. As a result, there was a dramatic increase in the development of new cotton plantations throughout the Deep South to cultivate short-staple cotton.

Settlers increased pressure on the federal government to remove Native Americans from the region, including the Five Civilized Tribes from the Southeast. In 1794, Revolutionary War veteran Elijah Clarke, led a group of men from Wilkes County into traditionally Creek lands and established a town and several forts and called it the Trans-Oconee Republic. While short lived, the incursion was part of a broader movement of incursion into traditionally native lands. Congress passed the Indian Removal Act in 1830 and the government forcibly removed most of the members of these tribes to Indian Territory west of the Mississippi River.

Production of short-staple cotton in the Deep South soon superseded that of long-staple cotton, grown primarily on the Sea Islands and in the Low Country. Such expansion dramatically increased the demand for slave labor in the Deep South, resulting in a longstanding domestic slave trade that transported more than a million slaves in forced migrations from the Upper South. King Cotton brought great wealth to many planters in the decades before the Civil War.

None of the battles of the American Civil War was fought in or near Wilkes County. But here President Jefferson Davis met for the final time with the Confederate Cabinet, and they officially dissolved the government of the Confederate States of America. Wilkes County was the last-known location of the gold rumored to have been lost from the Confederate Treasury. The present-day Wilkes County Courthouse was built in Washington at the site of the cabinet meeting.

== Geography ==
According to the U.S. Census Bureau, the county has a total area of 474 square miles (1,230 km^{2}), of which 469 square miles (1,210 km^{2}) is land and 4.6 square miles (12 km^{2}) (1.0%) is water. It is located in the Piedmont region above the fall line.

The northern quarter of Wilkes County, in a curved line from Rayle through Tignall to the northeastern corner of the county, is located in the Broad River sub-basin of the Savannah River basin. The eastern portion of the county, from Washington east, and bordered to the north and west by the Broad River sub-basin, is located in the Upper Savannah River sub-basin of the larger Savannah River basin. The rest of the county, south of Washington, is located in the Little River sub-basin of the Savannah River basin.

=== Major highways ===
- US 78 / SR 10
  - US 78 Bus. / SR 10 Bus. (Washington)
- US 378
- SR 17
  - SR 17 Bus. (Washington)
- SR 44
- SR 47
  - SR 47 Conn.
- SR 80

=== Adjacent counties ===
- Elbert County (north)
- Lincoln County (east)
- McDuffie County (southeast)
- Warren County (south)
- Taliaferro County (southwest)
- Oglethorpe County (west)

== Communities ==
=== City ===
- Washington (county seat)

=== Towns ===
- Rayle
- Tignall

== Demographics ==
Changes in agriculture through mechanization, the Great Depression, and a mass migration of African Americans from the area in the mid-20th century have resulted in a decline of population in the rural county since 1930.

Historical population
Census	Pop.	Note	%±
1790	31,500		—
1800	13,103		−58.4%
1810	14,887		13.6%
1820	17,607		18.3%
1830	14,237		−19.1%
1840	10,148		−28.7%
1850	12,107		19.3%
1860	11,420		−5.7%
1870	11,796		3.3%
1880	15,985		35.5%
1890	18,081		13.1%
1900	20,866		15.4%
1910	23,441		12.3%
1920	24,210		3.3%
1930	15,944		−34.1%
1940	15,084		−5.4%
1950	12,388		−17.9%
1960	10,961		−11.5%
1970	10,184		−7.1%
1980	10,951		7.5%
1990	10,597		−3.2%
2000	10,687		0.8%
2010	10,593		−0.9%
2020	9,565		−9.7%
2025 (est.)	9,540	▼	−0.3%
U.S. Decennial Census; 1790-1880 1890-1910; 1920-1930 1930-1940; 1940-1950 1960-1980; 1980-2000 2010

=== Racial and ethnic composition ===
Wilkes County, Georgia – Racial and ethnic composition Note: the US Census treats Hispanic/Latino as an ethnic category. This table excludes Latinos from the racial categories and assigns them to a separate category. Hispanics/Latinos may be of any race.
Race / Ethnicity (NH = Non-Hispanic)	Pop 1980	Pop 1990	Pop 2000	Pop 2010	Pop 2020	% 1980	% 1990	% 2000	% 2010	% 2020
White alone (NH)	5,860	5,633	5,758	5,495	4,952	53.51%	53.16%	53.88%	51.87%	51.77%
Black or African American alone (NH)	4,925	4,895	4,591	4,516	3,838	44.97%	46.19%	42.96%	42.63%	40.13%
Native American or Alaska Native alone (NH)	6	15	20	14	22	0.05%	0.14%	0.19%	0.13%	0.23%
Asian alone (NH)	6	10	25	48	59	0.05%	0.09%	0.23%	0.45%	0.62%
Native Hawaiian or Pacific Islander alone (NH)	x	x	4	1	0	x	x	0.04%	0.01%	0.00%
Other race alone (NH)	0	0	2	14	18	0.00%	0.00%	0.02%	0.13%	0.19%
Mixed race or Multiracial (NH)	x	x	75	144	277	x	x	0.70%	1.36%	2.90%
Hispanic or Latino (any race)	154	44	212	361	399	1.41%	0.42%	1.98%	3.41%	4.17%
Total	10,951	10,597	10,687	10,593	9,565	100.00%	100.00%	100.00%	100.00%	100.00%

=== 2020 census ===
As of the 2020 census, there were 9,565 people, 4,098 households, and 2,421 families residing in the county. The median age was 47.9 years. 20.0% of residents were under the age of 18 and 24.1% of residents were 65 years of age or older. For every 100 females there were 92.1 males, and for every 100 females age 18 and over there were 88.8 males age 18 and over. 0.0% of residents lived in urban areas, while 100.0% lived in rural areas.

The racial makeup of the county was 52.8% White, 40.2% Black or African American, 0.4% American Indian and Alaska Native, 0.6% Asian, 0.0% Native Hawaiian and Pacific Islander, 1.9% from some other race, and 4.1% from two or more races. Hispanic or Latino residents of any race comprised 4.2% of the population.

Of those households, 26.5% had children under the age of 18 living with them and 33.5% had a female householder with no spouse or partner present. About 31.9% of all households were made up of individuals and 16.5% had someone living alone who was 65 years of age or older.

There were 5,165 housing units, of which 20.7% were vacant. Among occupied housing units, 69.0% were owner-occupied and 31.0% were renter-occupied. The homeowner vacancy rate was 1.5% and the rental vacancy rate was 6.7%.

== Politics ==
As of the 2020s, Wilkes County is a strongly Republican voting county, voting 58% for Donald Trump in 2024. For elections to the United States House of Representatives, Wilkes County is part of Georgia's 12th congressional district, currently represented by Rick Allen. For elections to the Georgia State Senate, Wilkes County is part of District 24. For elections to the Georgia House of Representatives, Wilkes County is part of district District 123.

United States presidential election results for Wilkes County, Georgia
Year	Republican		Democratic		Third party(ies)	
Year	No.	%	No.	%	No.	%
1912	66	9.09%	657	90.50%	3	0.41%
1916	52	6.09%	785	91.92%	17	1.99%
1920	12	1.35%	876	98.65%	0	0.00%
1924	44	4.09%	836	77.77%	195	18.14%
1928	798	51.65%	747	48.35%	0	0.00%
1932	42	3.43%	1,172	95.75%	10	0.82%
1936	78	6.95%	1,031	91.89%	13	1.16%
1940	123	10.68%	1,022	88.72%	7	0.61%
1944	159	14.39%	946	85.61%	0	0.00%
1948	95	7.84%	771	63.61%	346	28.55%
1952	286	16.01%	1,500	83.99%	0	0.00%
1956	304	15.06%	1,714	84.94%	0	0.00%
1960	395	18.11%	1,786	81.89%	0	0.00%
1964	1,652	53.48%	1,437	46.52%	0	0.00%
1968	873	24.70%	953	26.96%	1,709	48.35%
1972	2,195	77.26%	646	22.74%	0	0.00%
1976	1,067	30.24%	2,461	69.76%	0	0.00%
1980	1,212	33.45%	2,350	64.86%	61	1.68%
1984	1,837	53.67%	1,586	46.33%	0	0.00%
1988	1,810	53.71%	1,549	45.96%	11	0.33%
1992	1,535	38.74%	1,955	49.34%	472	11.91%
1996	1,417	39.51%	1,971	54.96%	198	5.52%
2000	2,044	50.77%	1,940	48.19%	42	1.04%
2004	2,490	54.75%	2,028	44.59%	30	0.66%
2008	2,705	53.46%	2,315	45.75%	40	0.79%
2012	2,635	55.30%	2,087	43.80%	43	0.90%
2016	2,572	57.33%	1,848	41.19%	66	1.47%
2020	2,823	56.11%	2,160	42.93%	48	0.95%
2024	2,971	58.28%	2,112	41.43%	15	0.29%

United States Senate election results for Wilkes County, Georgia2
Year	Republican		Democratic		Third party(ies)	
Year	No.	%	No.	%	No.	%
2020	2,810	56.83%	2,057	41.60%	78	1.58%
2020	2,580	56.97%	1,949	43.03%	0	0.00%

United States Senate election results for Wilkes County, Georgia3
Year	Republican		Democratic		Third party(ies)	
Year	No.	%	No.	%	No.	%
2020	1,493	30.40%	1,257	25.60%	2,161	44.00%
2020	2,823	56.65%	2,160	43.35%	0	0.00%
2022	2,402	58.19%	1,680	40.70%	46	1.11%
2022	2,228	58.07%	1,609	41.93%	0	0.00%

Georgia Gubernatorial election results for Wilkes County
Year	Republican		Democratic		Third party(ies)	
Year	No.	%	No.	%	No.	%
2022	2,545	61.50%	1,583	38.26%	10	0.24%

== Education ==
The Wilkes County School District has four schools, including the Washington-Wilkes Comprehensive High School.

== Notable people ==
- Edward Porter Alexander
- Eliza Frances Andrews
- Benjamin F. Bryant, captain in the Battle of San Jacinto, founder of the Bryant Station frontier fort and Texas Ranger
- John Clark, Georgia governor
- Elijah Clarke
- Peter Early
- Frank Edwards, blues musician
- Stephen Heard
- Hosea Hudson (1898–1988) Black communist labor organizer and author of Black Worker in the Deep South
- George Mathews, Continental Army officer, Governor of Georgia, and US Congressman; member of the Mathews family
- Jesse Mercer
- David Meriwether, Continental Army officer, member United States Congress, Speaker of the Georgia House of Representatives, Major General - Georgia Militia
- Paul Jones Semmes
- Alexander H. Stephens
- Matthew Talbot
- Benjamin Taliaferro
- Robert Toombs
- George W. Towns

== See also ==
- Wilkes County Courthouse
- National Register of Historic Places listings in Wilkes County, Georgia
- Central Savannah River Area
- List of counties in Georgia
