= Vesta, Georgia =

Unincorporated community in Georgia, U.S.

Coordinates: 33°57′23″N 82°56′19″W

Vesta is an unincorporated community in Oglethorpe County, in the U.S. state of Georgia.

== History ==
A post office called Vesta was established in 1888, and remained in operation until 1904. The community was named after Vesta Johnson, the daughter of a local settler.
