= Wilkes County Courthouse (Georgia) =

- U.S. National Register of Historic Places
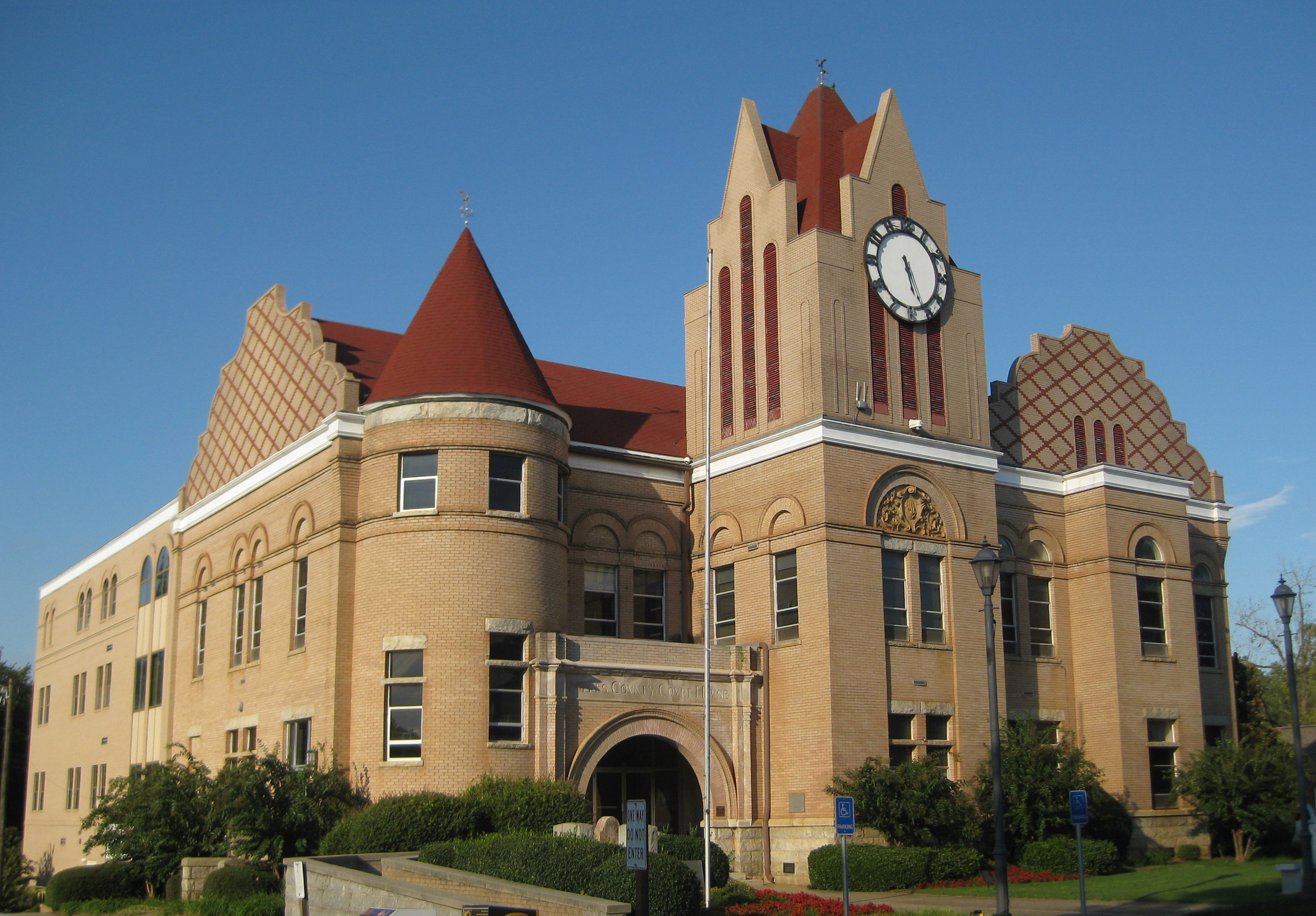
- The County Courthouse in Washington, Wilkes County, Georgia, United States

- Location within Georgia Location within the United States
- Location: 23 East Court Street; Washington, Georgia
- Coordinates: 33°44′17″N 82°44′20″W
- Built: 1904
- Architect: Frank Pierce Milburn
- Architectural style: Romanesque Revival; Richardsonian Romanesque (Primary influences)
- MPS: Georgia County Courthouses TR
- NRHP reference No.: 80001267
- Added to NRHP: September 18, 1980

The Wilkes County Courthouse is a historic government building and clock tower located in the city of Washington, Georgia, the seat of Wilkes County. The latest in a series of courthouses in the county's history, the current building was completed in 1904 and since that date has been the official home of Wilkes County's Superior Court, and the base of the county's government. On September 18, 1980, the building was added to the National Register of Historic Places.

== History ==
=== County court ===
Wilkes County, Georgia is one of the eight original counties created by Georgia's first state constitution on February 5, 1777, and the only county then not previously colonized or settled. A wilderness frontier with a handful of newcomers, Wilkes County was devoid of infrastructure. When the pioneers of Wilkes convened their first court on August 25, 1779, it was held in a private residence, the first of many transient venues during the county's infancy.

In 1780, the Georgia Legislature called for the establishment of the town of Washington. With the town to serve as a seat of government, court proceedings could be given a dedicated, regular venue. Wilkes County Court found its first permanent venue in a room at the local tavern, which effectively served as official courtroom until 1785. The tavern occupied part of the same lot where currently stands today's courthouse.

=== Previous courthouses ===
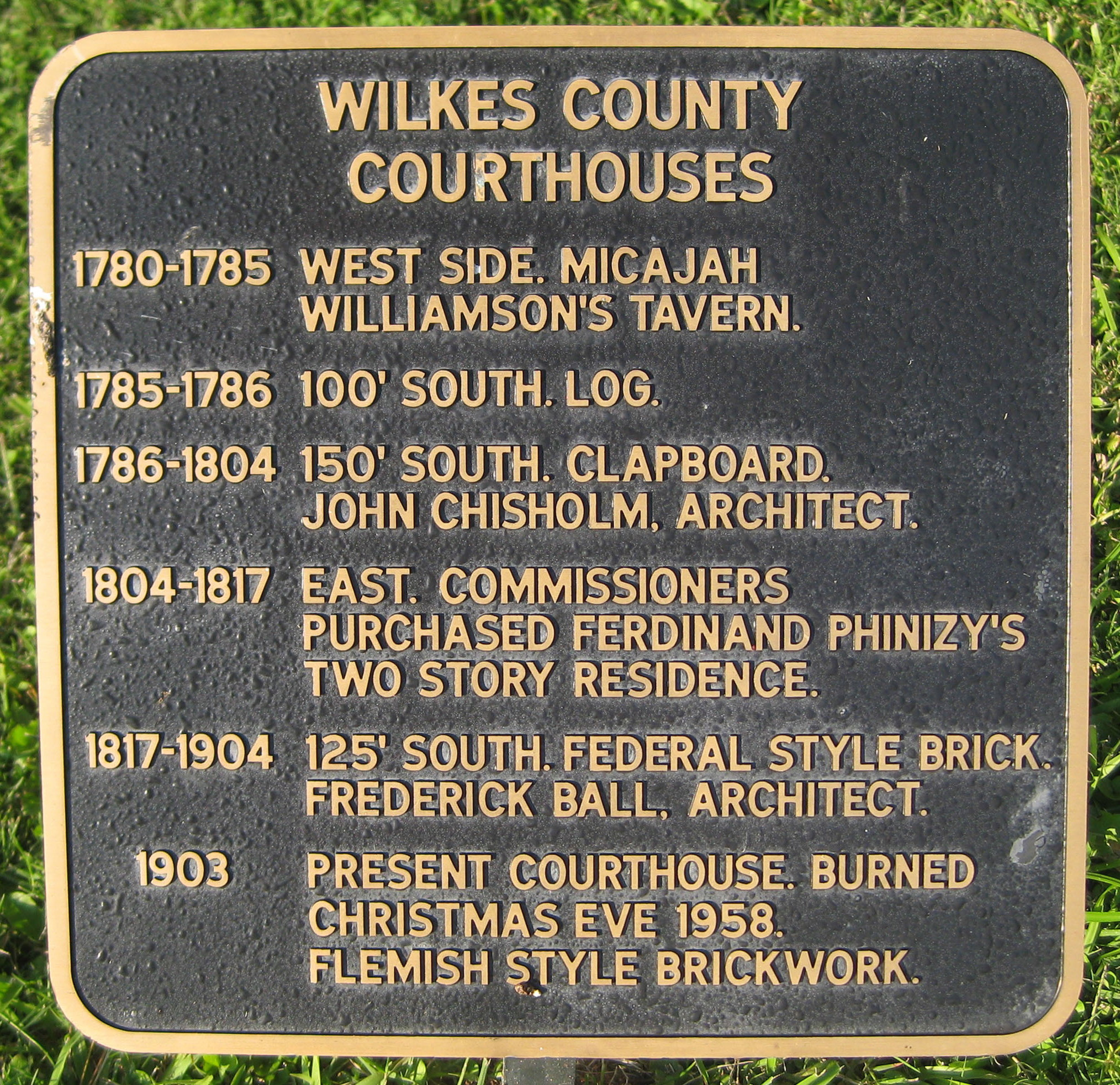
Plaque listing courthouses

By 1785, a new, independent building constructed of logs became Wilkes County's first genuine courthouse. According to a plaque on the present courthouse lawn, the log courthouse was replaced after only a year by a clapboard-style courthouse, which served the county from 1786 to 1804. Both the log and clapboard courthouses stood in what is today the public square in Washington. The next building had two stories and was originally the residence of Italian immigrant and U.S. patriot, Major Ferdinand Phinizy, who sold the house to Wilkes County Commissioners. Courthouse number three served the county between 1804 and 1817.

A Federal-style, brick structure in 1817 became Wilkes county's next courthouse and the first in Georgia to feature a clock tower. This most recent among Wilkes' former courthouses stood in the center of Washington's public square and served the county until 1904, when it was replaced by the current courthouse, then demolished.

=== Courthouse site ===
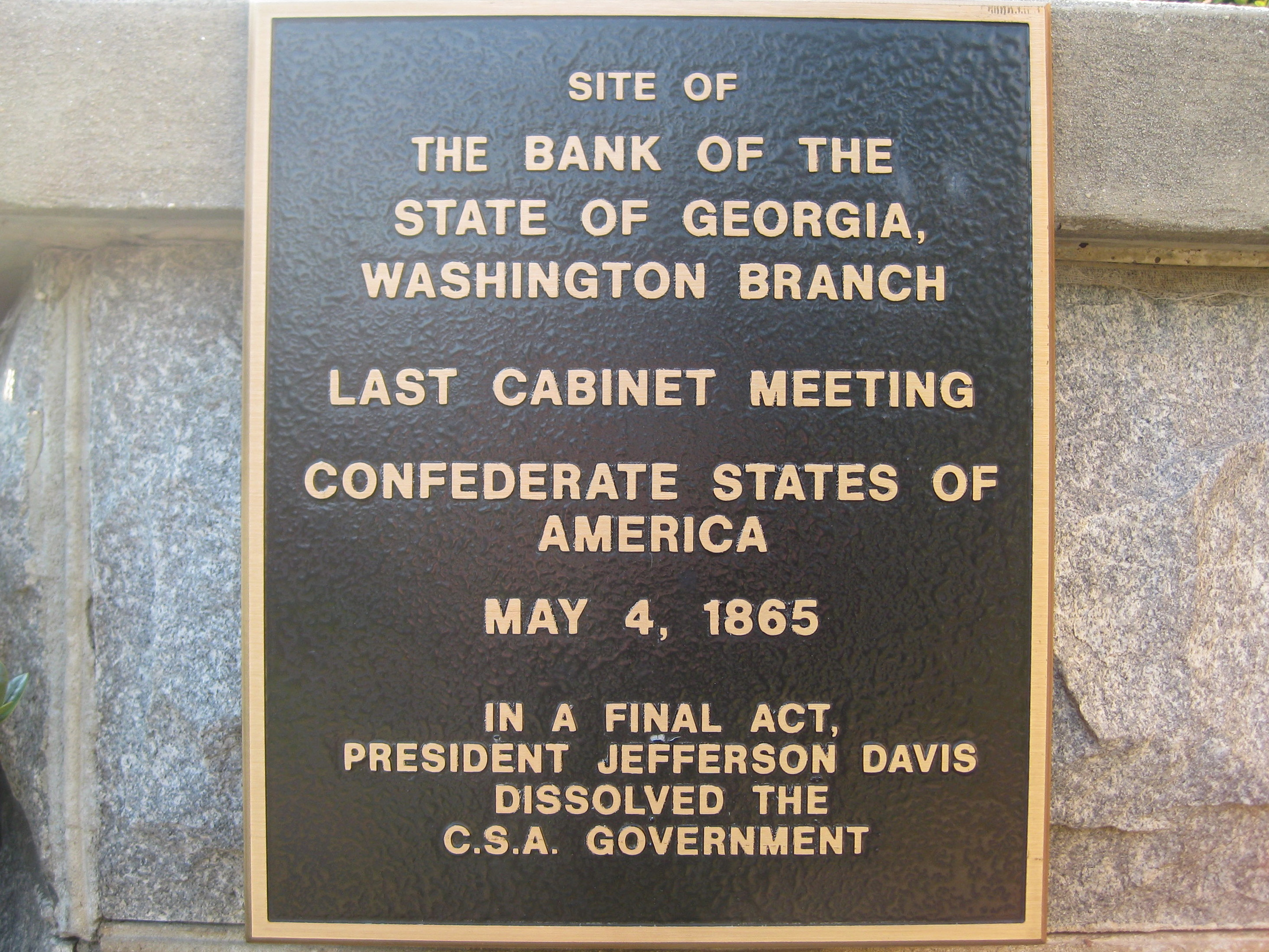
Plaque at Wilkes Courthouse noting final meeting of the C.S.A. government.

Washington in the 1890s was rife with rumors regarding railroad development and potential prosperity for Wilkes County. This fueled a push for civic projects and improvements by which the community hoped to more strongly lure railroad investment. The replacement of the 1817 courthouse soon became one such project, and before the century was out, County Commissioners had purchased the lot across from their existing courthouse, where in a few years they would build its replacement.

Already standing on said lot was a three-story 1824 structure known as the Heard House (not to be confused with Heard's Fort) or the old Georgia State Bank building. As the American Civil War was nearing its end, this building was the place where the President of the Confederacy, Jefferson Davis, convened the final session of the Confederate Cabinet. At this May 4, 1865 meeting the government of the Confederate States of America was officially dissolved. Despite this unique distinction in Southern and U.S. history, the building was razed to make way for the new courthouse. The events of 1865 are commemorated today with a plaque and a granite monument in front of the County Courthouse, as well as a Georgia Historical Society Marker about Jefferson Davis.

== Architecture ==
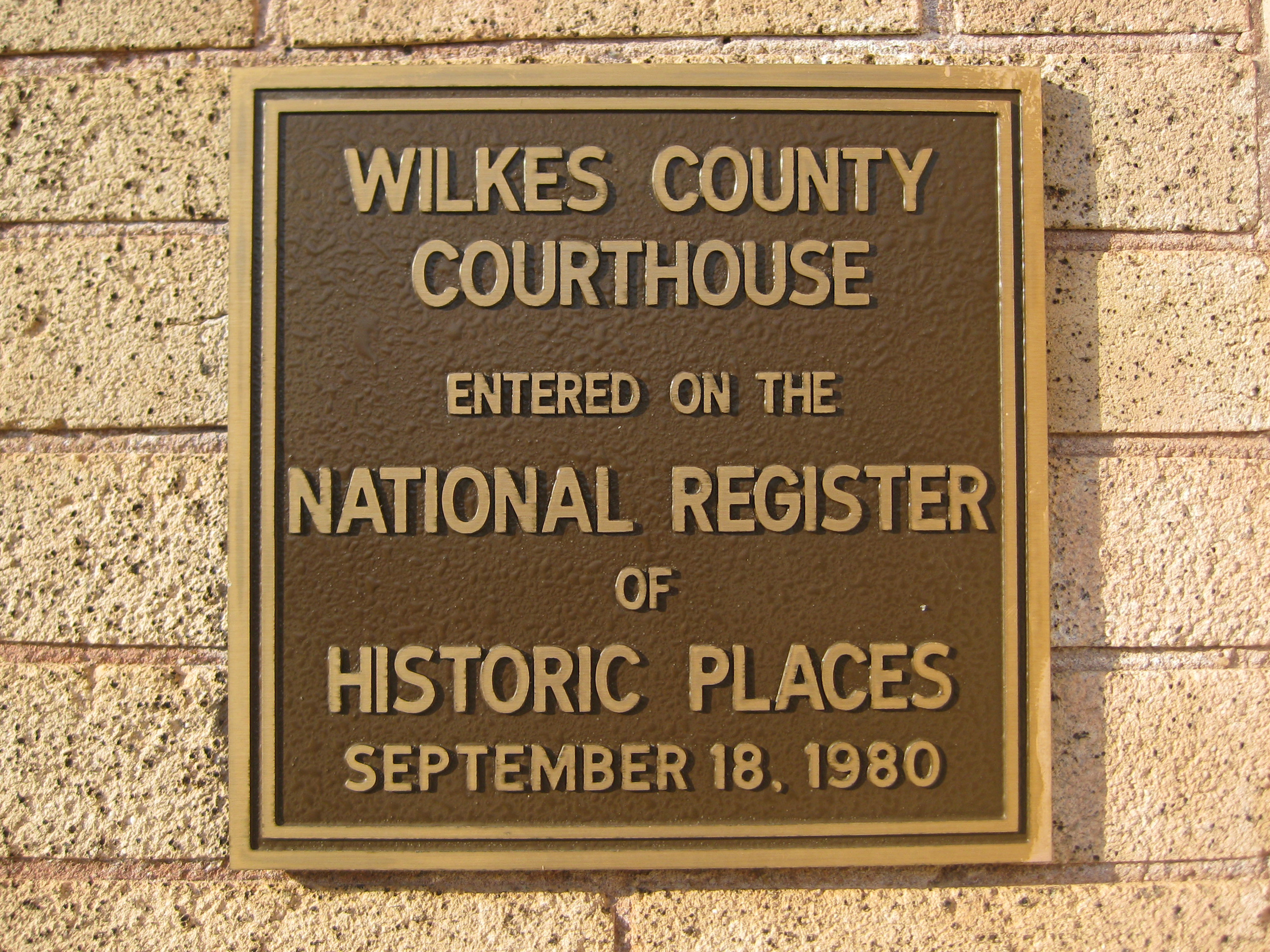
NRHP plaque

The Wilkes County, Georgia Courthouse and clock tower were designed by architect Frank Pierce Milburn, who was heavily influenced by the Richardsonian Romanesque and Romanesque Revival styles of architecture. It was originally constructed between 1903 and 1904 using sand-colored brick accented by red brick and natural stone. The total cost of the original construction was $40,000.

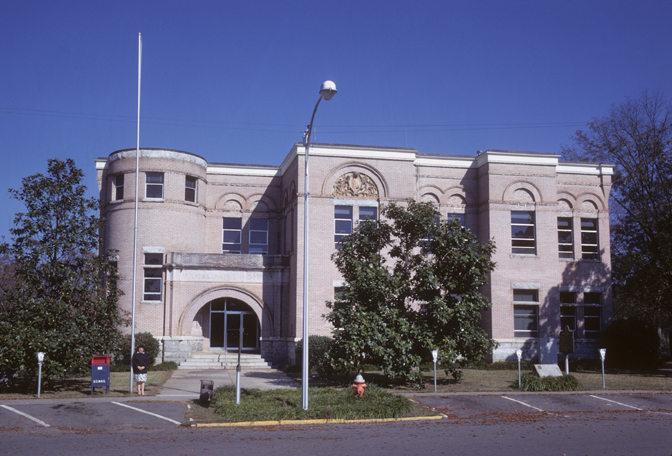
A fire in 1958 left the building with a flat roof until 1989.

The courthouse's original design and construction included extensive detail work around the base of the roof and elaborate ornamentation across the roof as a whole, plus a Gothic accented clock tower which nearly doubled the building's total height. These aspects of the original 1904 construction were destroyed in 1958, as a fire ravaged the courthouse's top half. As a result of the fire, the building was tower-less and capped by a flat roof for more than three decades until a restoration effort took place in 1989.

A partial restoration, the project restored a roof which approximates the original design, and a clock tower, albeit much shorter than the original. The ornamental detailing evident in the 1904 roof and Gothic embellished clock tower were omitted from the 1989 restoration due to limited project budget.

Prominent African American contractor Monroe Morton of Athens, Georgia was involved in the construction of the courthouse.

Wilkes County Courthouse was nominated for the U.S. National Register of Historic Places (NRHP) as part of a Multiple property submission (or MPS). The Georgia County Courthouses MPS included a select group of fifty-two of the state's former and current County Courthouses which were chosen based on their historical significance in the areas of architecture, communications, economics, law, and politics/government. All the properties in the Georgia County Courthouses MPS were accepted to the NRHP on September 18, 1980.

=== Additions ===
A new jail wing was added in 1911 onto the rear of the courthouse. A plaque mounted on the jail's exterior commemorates the first hanging to occur there. The December 5, 1911 execution from the third floor gallows happened before the jail's official dedication in January 1912.

A substantial addition was built upon the rear of the courthouse in 1989.

== Today ==
Today's Wilkes County Courthouse continues to operate in its traditional capacity.

It remains the location of The Superior Court of Wilkes County, which is a branch of the Toombs Judicial Circuit of the Tenth Judicial Administrative District of the Courts of Georgia, presides over jury trials, rules on evidence, hears motions, and renders verdicts in bench trials. Superior Court Judges are constitutionally elected to four-year terms of office.

Other judicial bodies under the Courts of Georgia that are housed within the county courthouse include the Magistrate Court of Wilkes County and the Probate Court of Wilkes County.

Meetings of the five-member Wilkes County Board of Commissioners convene at the courthouse. The courthouse also houses the office of the County Administrator.

== See also ==
- National Register of Historic Places listings in Wilkes County, Georgia
