= Arnoldsville, Georgia =

- City
- Location in Oglethorpe County and the state of Georgia
- Coordinates: 33°54′20″N 83°13′0″W
- Country: United States
- State: Georgia
- County: Oglethorpe

Area
  - Total: 1.71 sq mi (4.44 km^{2})
  - Land: 1.71 sq mi (4.43 km^{2})
  - Water: 0.0039 sq mi (0.01 km^{2})
- Elevation: 797 ft (243 m)

Population (2020)
  - Total: 431
  - Density: 251.7/sq mi (97.18/km^{2})
- Time zone: UTC-5 (Eastern (EST))
  - Summer (DST): UTC-4 (EDT)
- ZIP code: 30619
- Area code: 706
- FIPS code: 13-03124
- GNIS feature ID: 0354397
- Website: https://www.cityofarnoldsville.org/

Arnoldsville is a city in Oglethorpe County, Georgia, United States. As of the 2020 census, the city had a population of 431.

== History ==
Arnoldsville was originally called "Cherokee Corner". The name was changed in 1894 to Edwin, after Edwin Shaw, the keeper of a country store. In 1896, the store was sold to N. D. Arnold, and the town's name was changed yet again. Arnold incorporated in 1969.

Originally, the community was centered around Cherokee Corner.

== Geography ==
Arnoldsville is located at 33°54′20″N 83°13′0″W (33.905440, -83.216737). U.S. Route 78 passes just south of the city, leading east 4 mi (6.4 km) to Crawford and northwest 10 mi (16 km) to Athens.

According to the United States Census Bureau, the city has a total area of 1.7 square miles (4.4 km^{2}), all land.

== Demographics ==
Historical population
Census	Pop.	Note	%±
1970	181		—
1980	187		3.3%
1990	275		47.1%
2000	312		13.5%
2010	357		14.4%
2020	431		20.7%
U.S. Decennial Census

As of the census of 2000, there were 312 people, 125 households, and 88 families residing in the city. The population density was 185.7 inhabitants per square mile (71.7/km^{2}). There were 136 housing units at an average density of 80.9 per square mile (31.2/km^{2}). The racial makeup of the city was 96.47% White, 1.60% African American, 0.32% Asian, 0.96% from other races, and 0.64% from two or more races. Hispanic or Latino of any race were 1.92% of the population.

There were 125 households, out of which 33.6% had children under the age of 18 living with them, 56.8% were married couples living together, 11.2% had a female householder with no husband present, and 29.6% were non-families. 28.0% of all households were made up of individuals, and 10.4% had someone living alone who was 65 years of age or older. The average household size was 2.50 and the average family size was 3.08.

In the city, the population was spread out, with 26.3% under the age of 18, 9.3% from 18 to 24, 27.9% from 25 to 44, 24.4% from 45 to 64, and 12.2% who were 65 years of age or older. The median age was 37 years. For every 100 females, there were 95.0 males. For every 100 females age 18 and over, there were 88.5 males.

The median income for a household in the city was $32,750, and the median income for a family was $42,083. Males had a median income of $32,917 versus $21,667 for females. The per capita income for the city was $17,652. About 9.9% of families and 12.3% of the population were below the poverty line, including 18.9% of those under age 18 and 20.7% of those age 65 or over.
