= Rayle, Georgia =

- Town
- Location in Wilkes County and the state of Georgia
- Coordinates: 33°47′25″N 82°53′48″W
- Country: United States
- State: Georgia
- County: Wilkes

Area
  - Total: 1.04 sq mi (2.70 km^{2})
  - Land: 1.02 sq mi (2.65 km^{2})
  - Water: 0.019 sq mi (0.05 km^{2})
- Elevation: 702 ft (214 m)

Population (2020)
  - Total: 158
  - Density: 154.2/sq mi (59.55/km^{2})
- Time zone: UTC-5 (Eastern (EST))
  - Summer (DST): UTC-4 (EDT)
- ZIP code: 30660
- Area code: 706
- FIPS code: 13-63756
- GNIS feature ID: 0332801

Rayle is a town in Wilkes County, Georgia, United States. The population was 158 in 2020.

== Geography ==
Rayle is located at 33°47′25″N 82°53′48″W (33.790184, -82.896599). According to the United States Census Bureau, the town has a total area of 0.9 square miles (2.3 km^{2}), all land.

== Demographics ==
Historical population
| Census | Pop. | Note | %± |
|---|---|---|---|
| 1970 | 110 | | — |
| 1980 | 177 | | 60.9% |
| 1990 | 107 | | −39.5% |
| 2000 | 139 | | 29.9% |
| 2010 | 199 | | 43.2% |
| 2020 | 158 | | −20.6% |
U.S. Decennial Census

As of the census of 2000, there were 139 people, 54 households, and 38 families living in the town. By 2020, its population was 158.

== See also ==
- Central Savannah River Area
