= Maxeys, Georgia =

- Town
- Location in Oglethorpe County and the state of Georgia
- Coordinates: 33°45′26″N 83°10′26″W
- Country: United States
- State: Georgia
- County: Oglethorpe

Area
  - Total: 2.39 sq mi (6.20 km^{2})
  - Land: 2.38 sq mi (6.17 km^{2})
  - Water: 0.012 sq mi (0.03 km^{2})
- Elevation: 751 ft (229 m)

Population (2020)
  - Total: 198
  - Density: 83.2/sq mi (32.11/km^{2})
- Time zone: UTC-5 (Eastern (EST))
  - Summer (DST): UTC-4 (EDT)
- ZIP code: 30671
- Area code: 706
- FIPS code: 13-50260
- GNIS feature ID: 0328731
- Website: https://cityofmaxeys.com/

Maxeys is a town in Oglethorpe County, Georgia, United States. As of the 2020 census, Maxeys had a population of 198.

Durham Place and Apothecary

== History ==
The Georgia General Assembly incorporated Maxeys as a town in 1907. The town is named after the Maxeys family, early settlers.

== Geography ==
Maxeys is located at 33°45′26″N 83°10′26″W (33.757304, -83.173873).

According to the United States Census Bureau, the town has a total area of 2.4 square miles (6.2 km^{2}), of which 2.4 square miles (6.2 km^{2}) is land and 0.42% is water.

== Demographics ==
Historical population
Census	Pop.	Note	%±
1880	97		—
1910	334		—
1920	356		6.6%
1930	209		−41.3%
1940	226		8.1%
1950	204		−9.7%
1960	149		−27.0%
1970	229		53.7%
1980	205		−10.5%
1990	180		−12.2%
2000	210		16.7%
2010	224		6.7%
2020	198		−11.6%
U.S. Decennial Census

As of the census of 2000, there were 210 people, 77 households, and 62 families residing in the town. The population density was 87.8 inhabitants per square mile (33.9/km^{2}). There were 86 housing units at an average density of 36.0 per square mile (13.9/km^{2}). The racial makeup of the town was 92.38% White, 2.86% African American, 0.48% Native American, 2.86% from other races, and 1.43% from two or more races. Hispanic or Latino of any race were 2.86% of the population.

There were 77 households, out of which 27.3% had children under the age of 18 living with them, 74.0% were married couples living together, 6.5% had a female householder with no husband present, and 18.2% were non-families. 13.0% of all households were made up of individuals, and 9.1% had someone living alone who was 65 years of age or older. The average household size was 2.73 and the average family size was 3.02.

In the town, the population was spread out, with 23.8% under the age of 18, 8.6% from 18 to 24, 23.3% from 25 to 44, 22.9% from 45 to 64, and 21.4% who were 65 years of age or older. The median age was 42 years. For every 100 females, there were 92.7 males. For every 100 females age 18 and over, there were 86.0 males.

The median income for a household in the town was $53,125, and the median income for a family was $58,750. Males had a median income of $31,406 versus $22,750 for females. The per capita income for the town was $16,227. About 12.9% of families and 13.1% of the population were below the poverty line, including 14.5% of those under the age of eighteen and 6.3% of those sixty-five or over.

== Education ==
The AT Brightwell Scholarship is a college scholarship available only to residents of Maxeys, and will continue to pay college expenses through and including graduate school. It is available to all unmarried or divorced (proof of divorce necessary) students under 25 years of age who have lived within the strictly defined city limits of Maxeys for at least one year prior to the effective day of scholarship. The parents of the student must live and remain in Maxeys for the duration of the scholarship. Because this scholarship is potentially so lucrative, many real estate companies in the area advertise homes as "AT Brightwell eligible."
