= Crawford, Georgia =

- City
- Location in Oglethorpe County and the state of Georgia
- Coordinates: 33°53′0″N 83°9′19″W
- Country: United States
- State: Georgia
- County: Oglethorpe

Government
  - Mayor: Seavy O'Neal

Area
  - Total: 1.17 sq mi (3.04 km^{2})
  - Land: 1.17 sq mi (3.02 km^{2})
  - Water: 0.0077 sq mi (0.02 km^{2})
- Elevation: 778 ft (237 m)

Population (2020)
  - Total: 821
  - Density: 704.6/sq mi (272.05/km^{2})
- Time zone: UTC-5 (Eastern (EST))
  - Summer (DST): UTC-4 (EDT)
- ZIP code: 30630
- Area code: 706
- FIPS code: 13-20288
- GNIS feature ID: 0355367

Crawford is a city in Oglethorpe County, Georgia, United States. The population was 821 at the 2020 census.

== History ==
Crawford was originally called "Lexington Depot", and under the latter name had its start when the railroad was extended to that point. The Georgia General Assembly incorporated the place as the "Town of Crawford" in 1876. The present name is after William H. Crawford (1772–1834), U.S. Secretary of War and Secretary of the Treasury.

== Geography ==
Crawford is located at 33°53′0″N 83°9′19″W (33.883289, -83.155413). U.S. Route 78 passes through the city, leading southeast 3 mi (4.8 km) to Lexington, the Oglethorpe County seat, and northwest 14 mi (23 km) to Athens.

According to the United States Census Bureau, the city has a total area of 1.2 square miles (3.1 km^{2}), all land.

== Demographics ==
Historical population
Census	Pop.	Note	%±
1880	312		—
1900	308		—
1910	871		182.8%
1920	803		−7.8%
1930	538		−33.0%
1940	812		50.9%
1950	555		−31.7%
1960	541		−2.5%
1970	624		15.3%
1980	498		−20.2%
1990	694		39.4%
2000	807		16.3%
2010	832		3.1%
2020	821		−1.3%
U.S. Decennial Census

As of the census of 2000, there were 807 people, 326 households, and 203 families residing in the city. The population density was 687.5 inhabitants per square mile (265.4/km^{2}). There were 369 housing units at an average density of 314.4 per square mile (121.4/km^{2}). The racial makeup of the city was 68.77% White, 29.49% African American, 0.12% Native American, 0.37% Asian, and 1.24% from two or more races. Hispanic or Latino of any race were 1.24% of the population.

There were 326 households, out of which 28.8% had children under the age of 18 living with them, 38.7% were married couples living together, 19.3% had a female householder with no husband present, and 37.7% were non-families. 33.7% of all households were made up of individuals, and 17.2% had someone living alone who was 65 years of age or older. The average household size was 2.29 and the average family size was 2.93.

In the city, the population was spread out, with 23.0% under the age of 18, 8.7% from 18 to 24, 24.4% from 25 to 44, 20.0% from 45 to 64, and 23.9% who were 65 years of age or older. The median age was 40 years. For every 100 females, there were 71.3 males. For every 100 females age 18 and over, there were 67.4 males.

The median income for a household in the city was $19,917, and the median income for a family was $32,969. Males had a median income of $27,500 versus $19,028 for females. The per capita income for the city was $13,934. About 15.5% of families and 23.7% of the population were below the poverty line, including 19.6% of those under age 18 and 26.4% of those age 65 or over.

== Infrastructure ==
=== Transportation ===
Crawford is bisected east to west by U.S. Route 78. North Avenue is the primary northbound thoroughfare. The only traffic light in Oglethorpe County is at the intersection of U.S. 78 and North Avenue. Maxeys Road is the primary southbound thoroughfare. Smokey Road and Park Avenue are also primary residential streets leading out of town. Church Street and Elm Street are divided one-way streets in the heart of town that create the town plaza, where many local cultural and commercial activities are held. The nearest airport is Athens Ben-Epps Airport. Passenger rail in Crawford was maintained by the Georgia Railroad until 1984. Intercity bus service provided by Greyhound Lines runs a route through Crawford, though the loading point is in nearby Athens.

=== Utilities ===
Electricity is provided directly by Georgia Power. Water and sewage are provided by the city. The city maintains two treatment plants: one is located off U.S. 78 near the western city limit, while the second is located off Waterworks Road at the end of Park Avenue on the eastern city limit. The city also provides water services to some parts of Oglethorpe County as well as the county school system.
