= Lexington, Georgia =

- City
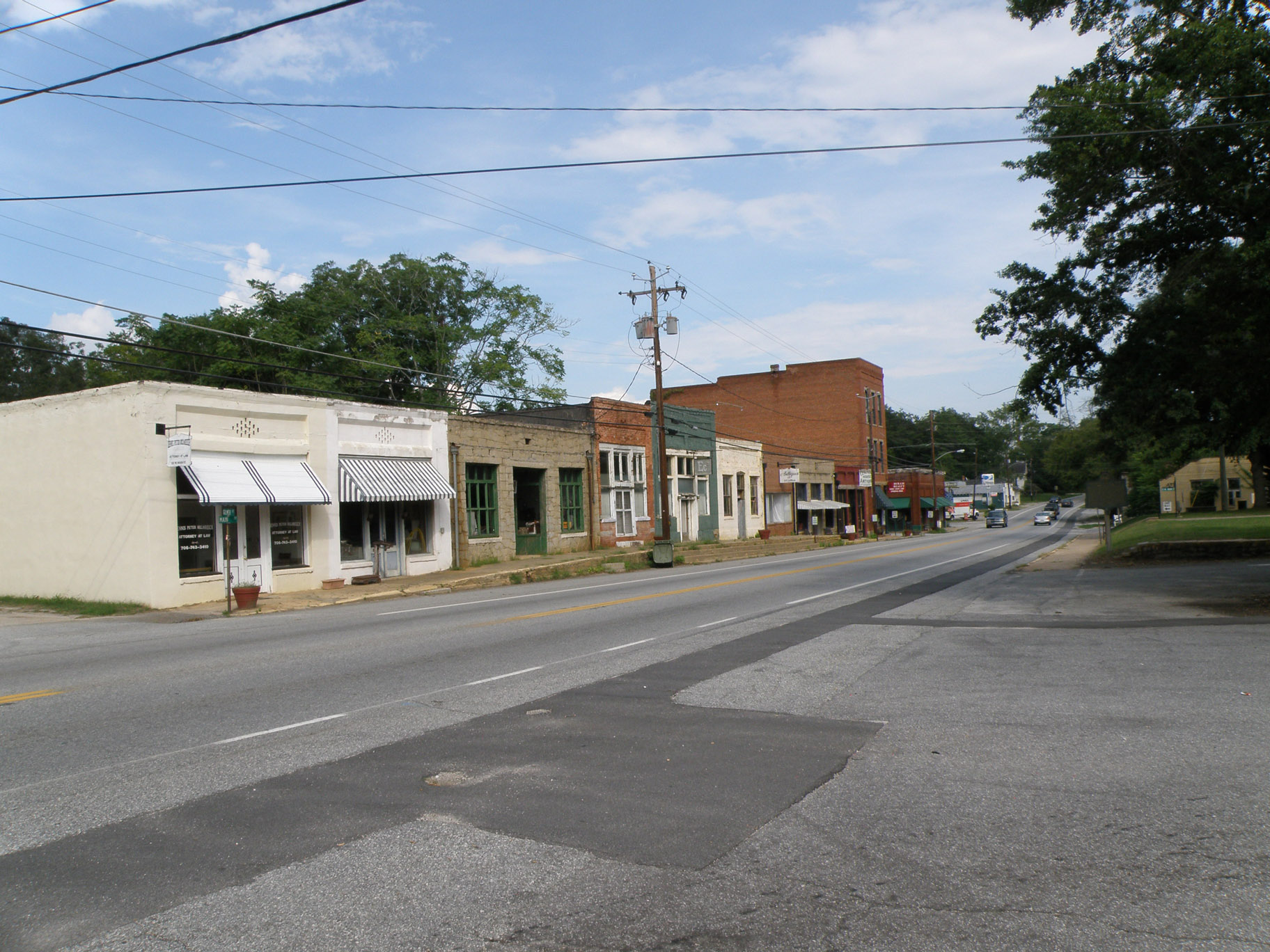
- A part of Main Street looking East while standing in front of the courthouse.

- Location in Oglethorpe County and the state of Georgia
- Coordinates: 33°52′13″N 83°6′39″W
- Country: United States
- State: Georgia
- County: Oglethorpe

Area
  - Total: 0.55 sq mi (1.42 km^{2})
  - Land: 0.55 sq mi (1.42 km^{2})
  - Water: 0 sq mi (0.00 km^{2})
- Elevation: 702 ft (214 m)

Population (2020)
  - Total: 203
  - Density: 370.5/sq mi (143.04/km^{2})
- Time zone: UTC-5 (Eastern (EST))
  - Summer (DST): UTC-4 (EDT)
- ZIP code: 30648
- Area code: 706
- FIPS code: 13-46188
- GNIS feature ID: 0316791
- Website: lexingtonga.org

The city of Lexington is the county seat of Oglethorpe County, Georgia, United States. As of the 2020 census, Lexington had a population of 203.

Lexington is home to Shaking Rock Park.

== History ==
Lexington was founded in 1800. That same year, the seat of Oglethorpe County was transferred to Lexington from Philomath. Lexington was incorporated as a town in 1806, and is named for Lexington, Massachusetts.

== Geography ==
Lexington is located at 33°52′13″N 83°6′39″W (33.870351, -83.110916). U.S. Route 78, as well as Georgia State Routes 22 and 77, all pass through the city. U.S. 78 leads southeast 25 mi (40 km) to Washington and northwest 17 mi (27 km) to Athens. GA-22 runs through the city concurrent with GA-22, leading north 15 mi (24 km) to Comer and southeast 28 mi (45 km) to Crawfordville. GA-77 leads northeast 25 mi (40 km) to Elberton and south 23 mi (37 km) to Union Point.

According to the United States Census Bureau, the city has a total area of 0.5 square miles (1.3 km^{2}), all land.

=== Climate ===
Climate data for Lexington, Georgia, 1991–2020 normals, extremes 2004–2019
| Month | Jan | Feb | Mar | Apr | May | Jun | Jul | Aug | Sep | Oct | Nov | Dec | Year |
|---|---|---|---|---|---|---|---|---|---|---|---|---|---|
| Record high °F (°C) | 78 (26) | 82 (28) | 89 (32) | 91 (33) | 96 (36) | 108 (42) | 110 (43) | 106 (41) | 99 (37) | 94 (34) | 86 (30) | 79 (26) | 110 (43) |
| Mean daily maximum °F (°C) | 54.8 (12.7) | 58.1 (14.5) | 65.8 (18.8) | 73.6 (23.1) | 81.1 (27.3) | 88.2 (31.2) | 90.8 (32.7) | 88.4 (31.3) | 84.9 (29.4) | 75.5 (24.2) | 64.8 (18.2) | 56.8 (13.8) | 73.6 (23.1) |
| Daily mean °F (°C) | 43.4 (6.3) | 46.9 (8.3) | 53.0 (11.7) | 60.6 (15.9) | 68.9 (20.5) | 76.6 (24.8) | 79.9 (26.6) | 78.1 (25.6) | 73.2 (22.9) | 62.9 (17.2) | 52.2 (11.2) | 45.7 (7.6) | 61.8 (16.5) |
| Mean daily minimum °F (°C) | 32.0 (0.0) | 35.8 (2.1) | 40.3 (4.6) | 47.7 (8.7) | 56.6 (13.7) | 65.0 (18.3) | 69.0 (20.6) | 67.8 (19.9) | 61.5 (16.4) | 50.4 (10.2) | 39.6 (4.2) | 34.6 (1.4) | 50.0 (10.0) |
| Record low °F (°C) | 6 (−14) | 12 (−11) | 20 (−7) | 26 (−3) | 37 (3) | 53 (12) | 55 (13) | 55 (13) | 45 (7) | 30 (−1) | 17 (−8) | 14 (−10) | 6 (−14) |
| Average precipitation inches (mm) | 4.30 (109) | 4.96 (126) | 4.72 (120) | 3.61 (92) | 3.30 (84) | 4.50 (114) | 3.93 (100) | 4.78 (121) | 3.83 (97) | 2.97 (75) | 3.76 (96) | 4.87 (124) | 49.53 (1,258) |
| Average snowfall inches (cm) | 0.0 (0.0) | 0.2 (0.51) | 0.2 (0.51) | 0.0 (0.0) | 0.0 (0.0) | 0.0 (0.0) | 0.0 (0.0) | 0.0 (0.0) | 0.0 (0.0) | 0.0 (0.0) | 0.0 (0.0) | 0.1 (0.25) | 0.5 (1.27) |
| Average precipitation days (≥ 0.01 in) | 8.9 | 9.1 | 9.0 | 7.4 | 8.3 | 9.5 | 8.8 | 8.7 | 6.4 | 5.8 | 7.5 | 9.2 | 98.6 |
| Average snowy days (≥ 0.1 in) | 0.2 | 0.1 | 0.1 | 0.0 | 0.0 | 0.0 | 0.0 | 0.0 | 0.0 | 0.0 | 0.0 | 0.1 | 0.5 |
Source 1: NOAA
Source 2: National Weather Service

== Demographics ==
Historical population
| Census | Pop. | Note | %± |
|---|---|---|---|
| 1810 | 222 | | — |
| 1880 | 441 | | — |
| 1900 | 635 | | — |
| 1910 | 545 | | −14.2% |
| 1920 | 469 | | −13.9% |
| 1930 | 455 | | −3.0% |
| 1940 | 517 | | 13.6% |
| 1950 | 514 | | −0.6% |
| 1960 | 376 | | −26.8% |
| 1970 | 322 | | −14.4% |
| 1980 | 278 | | −13.7% |
| 1990 | 230 | | −17.3% |
| 2000 | 239 | | 3.9% |
| 2010 | 228 | | −4.6% |
| 2020 | 203 | | −11.0% |
U.S. Decennial Census

As of the census of 2000, there were 239 people, 101 households, and 65 families residing in the city. The population density was 439.6 inhabitants per square mile (169.7/km^{2}). There were 115 housing units at an average density of 211.5 per square mile (81.7/km^{2}). The racial makeup of the city was 70.71% White, 25.94% African American, 0.84% Native American, and 2.51% from two or more races. Hispanic or Latino of any race were 1.26% of the population.

There were 101 households, out of which 23.8% had children under the age of 18 living with them, 44.6% were married couples living together, 17.8% had a female householder with no husband present, and 35.6% were non-families. 28.7% of all households were made up of individuals, and 11.9% had someone living alone who was 65 years of age or older. The average household size was 2.27 and the average family size was 2.82.

In the city, the population was spread out, with 19.2% under the age of 18, 10.0% from 18 to 24, 28.5% from 25 to 44, 26.8% from 45 to 64, and 15.5% who were 65 years of age or older. The median age was 40 years. For every 100 females, there were 100.8 males. For every 100 females age 18 and over, there were 103.2 males.

The median income for a household in the city was $41,932, and the median income for a family was $56,875. Males had a median income of $22,417 versus $38,056 for females. The per capita income for the city was $22,513. About 4.1% of families and 7.9% of the population were below the poverty line, including 20.9% of those under the age of eighteen and 9.4% of those 65 or over.

== Education ==
=== Oglethorpe County School District ===
The Oglethorpe County School District holds pre-school to grade twelve, and consists of a primary school (preK-2), an elementary school (3–5), a middle school (6–8), and a high school (9–12). The district has 145 full-time teachers and over 2,281 students.

- Oglethorpe County Elementary School
- Oglethorpe County Primary School
- Oglethorpe County Middle School
- Oglethorpe County High School

== Notable people ==
- Nathan Crawford Barnett, member of the Georgia House of Representatives and Georgia Secretary of State for more than 30 years. Raised in Lexington, and educated at the Lexington Academy
- Clifford Cleveland Brooks, planter and politician; member of the Louisiana State Senate from 1924 to 1932, born in Lexington in 1886
- William Harris Crawford, lawyer and politician
- George Rockingham Gilmer, statesman and politician
- Joseph Henry Lumpkin, lawyer
- Wilson Lumpkin, lawyer and politician
- Stephen Upson, lawyer and politician
