= Oglethorpe County, Georgia =

County in Georgia, United States

- County
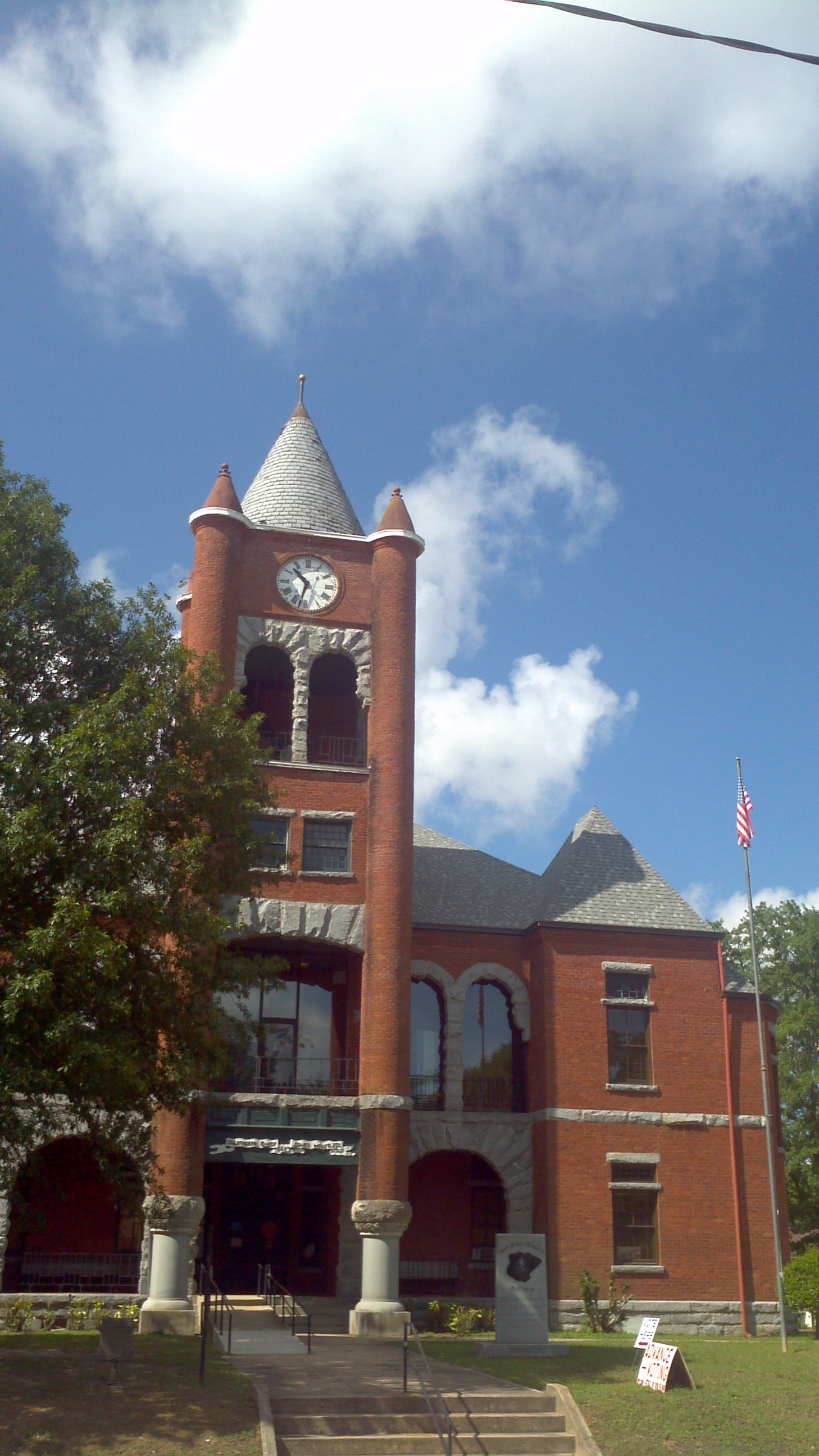
- Oglethorpe County Courthouse

- Flag Logo

- Location within the U.S. state of Georgia
- Coordinates: 33°53′N 83°05′W
- Country: United States
- State: Georgia
- Founded: December 19, 1795; 230 years ago
- Named for: James Oglethorpe
- Seat: Lexington
- Largest city: Crawford

Area
  - Total: 442 sq mi (1,140 km^{2})
  - Land: 439 sq mi (1,140 km^{2})
  - Water: 3.0 sq mi (7.8 km^{2}) 0.7%

Population (2020)
  - Total: 14,825
  - Estimate (2025): 16,415 ▲
  - Density: 34/sq mi (13/km^{2})
- Time zone: UTC−5 (Eastern)
  - Summer (DST): UTC−4 (EDT)
- Congressional district: 10th
- Website: oglethorpecountyga.gov

Oglethorpe County is a county located in the northeastern part of the U.S. state of Georgia. As of the 2020 census, the population was 14,825. The county seat is Lexington.

Oglethorpe County is included in the Athens-Clarke County, GA Metropolitan Statistical Area, which is also included in the Atlanta-Athens-Clarke County-Sandy Springs, GA Combined Statistical Area. It is the largest county in Northeast Georgia.

== History ==
Oglethorpe County was originally part of a large tract of land surrendered by Creek and Cherokee Native Americans to the Colony of Georgia in the treaty of 1773. The county itself was founded on December 19, 1793, and is named for Georgia's founder, General James Oglethorpe.

On September 10, 1919, Obe Cox was accused of murdering a White farmer's wife. He was seized by a White mob taken to the scene of the crime, his body riddled with bullets and burned at the stake. Several thousand persons witnessed the scene. The lynching was controversial as the local black community "thanked" the mob for just killing Cox and not attacking their community. After an investigation the black media of the time reported that the blacks who wrote the letter thanking the lynching "do not stand for much in the town and are excused for their utter ignorance in condoning [lynching]."

== Controversy ==
In June 2018, Oglethorpe County Sheriff's Office came under protest after a controversial hire was made of former Athens-Clarke County Police Officer Tyler Saulters. Saulters, who was fired from ACCPD, was involved in a controversial use of deadly force with his vehicle, striking a fleeing misdemeanor suspect while attempting to apprehend him in Athens, GA. Protestors were upset that Oglethorpe County Sheriff, David Gabriel, defended the hire and the use of force by the former ACCPD officer.

In April 2021, Oglethorpe County Sheriff's Deputy Michael Davis was arrested and charged by the Georgia Bureau of Investigation for two counts of aggravated assault. The arrest stemmed from an on-duty use-of-force, in Clarke County. Davis struck a vehicle he had already performed a traffic stop on. After striking the vehicle, Davis discharged his duty weapon at the vehicle. When the vehicle fled from the unprovoked and unjustified shooting by the Deputy, the deputy pursued and involved officers from the Athens-Clarke County Police Department. ACCPD requested an investigation by the GBI, which is standard in most officer involved shootings in Georgia.

In August 2024, YouTuber DG Hamblin, produced interviews with a former Oglethorpe County Sheriff's Deputy about his experiences as a police officer. During the interviews excessive use of force by a Sheriff's commander and failure to report that use of force was discussed as well as Sheriff's commanders' interactions with the controversial Poulan Police Department.

On August 29, 2024, Oglethorpe County Sheriff's Deputies engaged in a pursuit with a motorcycle for a minor traffic violation (missing registration plate) inside Oglethorpe County. During the pursuit, speeds reached 100 mph (160 km/h). According to the Oglethorpe County Sheriff's Office, the Deputy pursuing the motorcycle called the chase off inside Clarke County but continued to follow the motorcycle. The motorcyclist was involved in a collision with another vehicle at the intersection of Lexington Road and Woodgrove Road in Clarke County. The motorcyclist died on scene, according to the Georgia State Patrol, who investigated the collision and pursuit that led up to the fatal collision.

== Geography ==
According to the U.S. Census Bureau, the county has a total area of 442 square miles (1,140 km^{2}), of which 439 square miles (1,140 km^{2}) is land and 3.0 square miles (7.8 km^{2}) (0.7%) is water. The county is located in the Piedmont region of the state.

The majority of Oglethorpe County is located in the Broad River sub-basin of the Savannah River basin. A narrow western portion of the county, in a line from just north of Woodville, through Crawford, to just south of Winterville, is located in the Upper Oconee River sub-basin of the Altamaha River basin. A small part of the southern portion of the county, from Maxeys east, is located in the Little River sub-basin of the Savannah River basin.

=== River ===
- Broad River

=== Adjacent counties ===
- Elbert County (northeast)
- Wilkes County (east)
- Taliaferro County (southeast)
- Greene County (south)
- Oconee County (west)
- Clarke County (west)
- Madison County (north)

=== National protected area ===
- Oconee National Forest (part)
- Watson Mill Bridge State Park (part)

== Communities ==
=== Cities ===
- Arnoldsville
- Crawford
- Lexington

=== Towns ===
- Maxeys

=== Unincorporated communities ===
- Philomath
- Point Peter
- Sandy Cross
- Stephens
- Vesta

== Demographics ==
Historical population
Census	Pop.	Note	%±
1800	9,780		—
1810	12,297		25.7%
1820	14,046		14.2%
1830	13,618		−3.0%
1840	10,868		−20.2%
1850	12,259		12.8%
1860	11,549		−5.8%
1870	11,782		2.0%
1880	15,400		30.7%
1890	16,951		10.1%
1900	17,881		5.5%
1910	18,680		4.5%
1920	20,287		8.6%
1930	12,927		−36.3%
1940	12,430		−3.8%
1950	9,958		−19.9%
1960	7,926		−20.4%
1970	7,598		−4.1%
1980	8,929		17.5%
1990	9,763		9.3%
2000	12,635		29.4%
2010	14,899		17.9%
2020	14,825		−0.5%
2025 (est.)	16,415	▲	10.7%
U.S. Decennial Census; 1790-1880 1890-1910; 1920-1930 1930-1940; 1940-1950 1960-1980; 1980-2000 2010

=== Racial and ethnic composition ===
Oglethorpe County, Georgia – Racial and ethnic composition Note: the US Census treats Hispanic/Latino as an ethnic category. This table excludes Latinos from the racial categories and assigns them to a separate category. Hispanics/Latinos may be of any race.
Race / Ethnicity (NH = Non-Hispanic)	Pop 1980	Pop 1990	Pop 2000	Pop 2010	Pop 2020	% 1980	% 1990	% 2000	% 2010	% 2020
White alone (NH)	6,044	7,267	9,817	11,429	10,903	67.69%	74.43%	77.70%	76.71%	73.54%
Black or African American alone (NH)	2,749	2,398	2,476	2,557	2,248	30.79%	24.56%	19.60%	17.16%	15.16%
Native American or Alaska Native alone (NH)	11	23	22	33	40	0.12%	0.24%	0.17%	0.22%	0.27%
Asian alone (NH)	5	7	30	65	134	0.06%	0.07%	0.24%	0.44%	0.90%
Native Hawaiian or Pacific Islander alone (NH)	x	x	5	2	5	x	x	0.04%	0.01%	0.03%
Other race alone (NH)	8	2	9	18	53	0.09%	0.02%	0.07%	0.12%	0.36%
Mixed race or Multiracial (NH)	x	x	102	249	573	x	x	0.81%	1.67%	3.87%
Hispanic or Latino (any race)	112	66	174	546	869	1.25%	0.68%	1.38%	3.66%	5.86%
Total	8,929	9,763	12,635	14,899	14,825	100.00%	100.00%	100.00%	100.00%	100.00%

=== 2020 census ===
As of the 2020 census, the county had a population of 14,825, 5,803 households, and 3,711 families residing in the county. 0.0% of residents lived in urban areas, while 100.0% lived in rural areas.

As of the 2020 census, the median age was 43.3 years, with 21.5% of residents under the age of 18 and 19.3% aged 65 or older. For every 100 females there were 96.9 males, and for every 100 females age 18 and over there were 94.9 males age 18 and over.

As of the 2020 census, the racial makeup of the county was 74.7% White, 15.2% Black or African American, 0.4% American Indian and Alaska Native, 0.9% Asian, 0.0% Native Hawaiian and Pacific Islander, 2.8% from some other race, and 6.0% from two or more races. Hispanic or Latino residents of any race comprised 5.9% of the population.

As of the 2020 census, the 5,803 households included 29.8% with children under the age of 18 living with them and 24.5% with a female householder and no spouse or partner present. About 25.1% of all households were composed of individuals and 11.8% had someone living alone who was 65 years of age or older.

As of the 2020 census, there were 6,343 housing units, of which 8.5% were vacant. Among occupied housing units, 80.4% were owner-occupied and 19.6% were renter-occupied. The homeowner vacancy rate was 1.5% and the rental vacancy rate was 5.7%.

== Education ==
There is one K-12 school district in the county: Oglethorpe County School District.

== Recreation ==
- White Water Rafting on the Broad and South Fork Broad Rivers
- ATV and Motor Bike Park
- Sportsman Hunting: Seasonal Whitetail Deer, Turkey and Rabbit

Historic Districts and Heritage Research, Antique Stores in Historic Lexington, Agriculture and Agritourism as well as Oglethorpe Fresh Produce

In 2016, the Oglethorpe County Recreation Department was named both the District 7 and State Agency of the Year for populations under 20,000 through the Georgia Recreation and Park Association.

== Transportation ==
=== Major highways ===
- U.S. Route 78 / State Route 10
- State Route 22
- State Route 77

=== Pedestrians and cycling ===
The county has limited walkability options available.

== Politics ==
As of the 2020s, Oglethorpe County is a strongly Republican voting county, voting 70.9% for Donald Trump in 2024. For elections to the United States House of Representatives, Oglethorpe County is part of Georgia's 10th congressional district, currently represented by Mike Collins. For elections to the Georgia State Senate, Oglethorpe County is part of District 24. For elections to the Georgia House of Representatives, Oglethorpe County is part of District 124.

United States presidential election results for Oglethorpe County, Georgia
Year	Republican		Democratic		Third party(ies)	
Year	No.	%	No.	%	No.	%
1912	50	9.09%	400	72.73%	100	18.18%
1916	18	2.51%	657	91.63%	42	5.86%
1920	42	4.74%	844	95.26%	0	0.00%
1924	129	6.56%	1,748	88.96%	88	4.48%
1928	205	20.14%	813	79.86%	0	0.00%
1932	34	2.66%	1,240	97.03%	4	0.31%
1936	115	11.93%	845	87.66%	4	0.41%
1940	131	13.79%	818	86.11%	1	0.11%
1944	173	15.80%	922	84.20%	0	0.00%
1948	62	5.55%	819	73.26%	237	21.20%
1952	208	12.46%	1,461	87.54%	0	0.00%
1956	167	10.63%	1,404	89.37%	0	0.00%
1960	142	9.17%	1,406	90.83%	0	0.00%
1964	1,126	56.58%	864	43.42%	0	0.00%
1968	383	14.71%	483	18.56%	1,737	66.73%
1972	1,712	84.00%	326	16.00%	0	0.00%
1976	811	30.43%	1,854	69.57%	0	0.00%
1980	1,187	41.56%	1,611	56.41%	58	2.03%
1984	2,122	63.15%	1,238	36.85%	0	0.00%
1988	1,951	62.61%	1,154	37.03%	11	0.35%
1992	1,590	42.94%	1,491	40.26%	622	16.80%
1996	1,826	48.03%	1,570	41.29%	406	10.68%
2000	2,706	61.71%	1,519	34.64%	160	3.65%
2004	3,688	65.41%	1,899	33.68%	51	0.90%
2008	4,144	64.12%	2,232	34.54%	87	1.35%
2012	4,251	67.64%	1,914	30.45%	120	1.91%
2016	4,625	69.30%	1,831	27.43%	218	3.27%
2020	5,592	68.71%	2,439	29.97%	107	1.31%
2024	6,255	70.90%	2,515	28.51%	52	0.59%

United States Senate election results for Oglethorpe County, Georgia2
Year	Republican		Democratic		Third party(ies)	
Year	No.	%	No.	%	No.	%
2020	5,500	68.26%	2,323	28.83%	234	2.90%
2020	4,985	69.03%	2,237	30.97%	0	0.00%

United States Senate election results for Oglethorpe County, Georgia3
Year	Republican		Democratic		Third party(ies)	
Year	No.	%	No.	%	No.	%
2020	2,901	36.40%	1,720	21.58%	3,349	42.02%
2020	4,959	68.70%	2,259	31.30%	0	0.00%
2022	4,638	68.35%	1,996	29.41%	152	2.24%
2022	4,340	69.36%	1,917	30.64%	0	0.00%

Georgia Gubernatorial election results for Oglethorpe County
Year	Republican		Democratic		Third party(ies)	
Year	No.	%	No.	%	No.	%
2022	4,998	73.38%	1,766	25.93%	47	0.69%

== Notable people ==
- Nathan Crawford Barnett, member of the Georgia House of Representatives and Georgia Secretary of State for more than 30 years. Raised in Lexington, and educated at the Lexington Academy
- William H. Crawford (1772–1834) - U.S. Minister to France, U.S. Secretary of War, and U.S. Secretary of the Treasury
- George R. Gilmer (1790–1859) - Twice Governor
- Meriwether Lewis (1774–1809) - leader of the Lewis and Clark Expedition
- Wilson Lumpkin (1783–1870) - Governor
- Joseph H. Lumpkin (1799–1867) First Chief Justice of the Georgia Supreme Court and co-founder of the Lumpkin Law School
- George Mathews (1739–1812) - Revolutionary hero and twice Governor
- Kenny Rogers - Country music performer

== See also ==
- National Register of Historic Places listings in Oglethorpe County, Georgia
- List of counties in Georgia
