= National Register of Historic Places listings in Columbia County, Georgia =

Location of Columbia County in Georgia

This is a list of properties and districts in Columbia County, Georgia that are listed on the National Register of Historic Places (NRHP).

This National Park Service list is complete through NPS recent listings posted March 21, 2025.

== Current listings ==
	Name on the Register	Image	Date listed	Location	City or town	Description
1	Augusta Canal Industrial District	Augusta Canal Industrial District	May 27, 1971 (#71000285)	Along the west bank of the Savannah River from the Richmond-Columbia county line to 10th and Fenwick Sts. 33°29′51″N 81°59′47″W	Augusta	National Historic Landmark (canal and historic district), mostly in Richmond County
2	Columbia County Courthouse	Columbia County Courthouse	September 18, 1980 (#80001005)	State Route 47; 33°32′35″N 82°18′57″W	Appling	
3	Kiokee Baptist Church	Kiokee Baptist Church	December 8, 1978 (#78000976)	Kiokee Rd. 33°34′41″N 82°17′32″W	Appling	
4	Stallings Island		October 15, 1966 (#66000279)	Address Restricted	Augusta	An archeological site with shell mounds that is a U.S. National Historic Landmark
5	Woodville	Woodville	May 10, 1979 (#79000714)	Address Restricted	Winfield	
