= Kiokee, Georgia =

Community in the state of Georgia

- Unincorporated community
- Location within Georgia Location within the United States
- Country: United States
- State: Georgia
- County: Columbia
- Elevation: 307 ft (94 m)
- Time zone: UTC-5 (Eastern (EST))
  - Summer (DST): UTC-4 (EDT)
- Area codes: 706 & 762
- GNIS ID: 348905

Kiokee is an unincorporated community in Columbia County in the U.S. state of Georgia. It is located along Georgia State Route 104, 7 miles (11 km) northwest of Evans and 17 miles (27 km) northwest of downtown Augusta.

== History ==
A post office called Kiokee was established in 1859 and remained in operation until 1900. The community took its name from nearby Kiokee Creek.

== See also ==
- Kiokee Baptist Church, historic church 8 miles (13 km) to the southwest in Appling, Georgia
