= List of National Natural Landmarks in Georgia =

As of 2023, there are eleven National Natural Landmarks in the U.S. state of Georgia.

Georgia National Natural Landmarks (clickable map)

Name	Image	Date	Location	County	Ownership	Description
Big Hammock Natural Area		1976	31.86522°N 82.0864°W	Tattnall	state (Dept. of Natural Resources)	Relatively undisturbed broadleaf evergreen hammock forest.
Camp E.F. Boyd Natural Area		1974		Emanuel	private	One of the best representatives of the upland sand ridge ecosystem of the Coastal Plain
Cason J. Calloway Memorial Forest		1972	32.7498°N 84.9346°W	Harris	private	An outstanding example of transitional conditions between eastern deciduous and southern coniferous forest types.
Ebenezer Creek Swamp		1976	32.3640°N 81.2313°W	Effingham	private	The best remaining cypress-gum swamp forest in the Savannah River basin.
Heggie's Rock		1980	33°32′29.8″N 82°15′13.1″W	Columbia	county, private (The Nature Conservancy)	The best example in eastern North America of the remarkable endemic flora restricted to granite outcrops.
Lewis Island Tract		1974	31.4°N 81.5°W	McIntosh	state (Department of Natural Resources)	One of the most extensive bottomland hardwood swamps in Georgia. website
Marshall Forest		1966	34.250898°N 85.195375°W	Floyd	private	A loblolly pine-shortleaf pine forest believed to have originated following an intense fire at about the time the Cherokee Indians were forcibly removed to Oklahoma.
Okefenokee Swamp		1974	30.616667°N 82.316667°W	Charlton, Clinch, Ware	federal (Okefenokee National Wildlife Refuge)	One of the largest and most primitive swamps in the country.
Panola Mountain		1980	33.635278°N 84.170278°W	Rockdale	state (Department of Natural Resources)	The most natural and undisturbed monadnock of exposed granitic rock in the Piedmont biophysiographic province.
Wassaw Island		1967	31.9003°N 80.9822°W	Chatham	federal (Wassaw National Wildlife Refuge)	Only barrier island in Georgia with an undisturbed forest cover.
Wade Tract Preserve		2014	30.75°N 84°W	Thomas	private	Old growth longleaf pine savanna.

== See also ==
- List of National Historic Landmarks in Georgia
