= Britnie Turner =

US entrepreneur, real estate investor

- Born: Britnie Turner; North Augusta, South Carolina, The United States
- Education: MorningStar University
- Occupation: Philanthropist
- Years active: 2009–present

Britnie Faith Turner is an American businesswoman and philanthropist from South Carolina, United States. She is founder and CEO of Aerial Group, a Tennessee-based social enterprise company that provides real estate development, media production, education, motivational speaking, disaster relief, nation development, and other non-profit work. Aerial was listed by Forbes and by Fortune as the "6th Fastest-Growing Woman-Owned/Woman-Led Company in the World" based on the annual ranking by the Women Presidents' Organization (WPO) in 2016. Fortune also listed Aerial as the "3rd Fastest-Growing Inner City Company in the United States" in 2016 as ranked by Initiative for a Competitive Inner City (ICIC). Turner was most recently named as one of the "2021 Successful Women in Business" by Start Up Weekly.

== Awards and recognition ==
- 2014, Glamour magazine, "Inspiring Women of The Year From Around America"
- 2014, Cystic Fibrosis Foundation, "30 Under 30" (Nashville)
- 2014, Council for Women in the Workforce, "Women to Watch"
- 2014, Ernst & Young "Entrepreneurial Winning Women
- 2014, Glamour magazine "Hometown Heroes"
- 2015, Enterprising Women magazine, "Enterprising Women of the Year"
- 2015, National Association of Women in the Real Estate Business, The Gershwin Award
- 2016, Nashville Business Journal "40 Under 40"
- 2016, Nashville Business Journal, "Women of Influence"
- 2018, Nashville Next Awards, "Entrepreneur of the Year Finalist"
- 2019, Coastal Carolina Women in Philanthropy and Leadership, "Inspiring Women of the Year"
- 2020, Fortune Magazine, "Leading Women in Business"
- 2020, Hendersonville Chamber of Commerce, "Women Impacting the Community" nominee
- 2021, The Startup Weekly, "Successful Women in Business to Watch"

== Early life and education ==
Turner was born in North Augusta, South Carolina, in 1988. She is the second of six children born to her parents. Turner was homeschooled by her mother until the 9th grade, after which she attended Augusta Christian for one year, then North Augusta High School, where she graduated in 2006. After graduating high school she attended MorningStar University, a ministry school in South Carolina started by Rick Joyner.

== Real estate career ==
Turner's interest in the real estate field started while she was a student at MorningStar, when she attended a session with a real estate investor as the main speaker. She later bought her first house in Charlotte, North Carolina, at the height of the real estate market in 2007. Turner started flipping homes in early January 2011. She moved on to renovate and sell more than 100 homes in the following two years, and in 2013 was one of Nashville’s largest and most award-winning home renovators.

== Companies ==
=== Aerial Group ===
Named to the INC 5000 list in 2020, Aerial Group is a multi-national social enterprise business. Aerial operates a portfolio of companies, including Aerial Development Group, Aerial Properties, Aerial Produced, Aerial Recovery Group, The Aerial BVI and G-FORCE. The non-profit arm for Aerial Group of companies is called Aerial Global Community, a 501(c)(3) organization that works on charitable projects.

The group's awards and nominations include:

- 2016, Forbes #6 Fastest-Growing Women-Owned and Women-Led Business in the World
- 2020 and 2021, Inc 5000 America's Fastest-Growing Private Companies
- 2021, Startup Weekly Exceptional Workplace Award
- 2021, Titan Business Awards, Platinum Titan Business Award for the Entrepreneur and Small Business categories

=== Aerial Development Group ===
Aerial Development Group is a residential and commercial development company that provides revitalization and sustainability of the urban core and developing nations. Turner founded the company in 2009, starting out with renovation projects and subsequently full revitalization projects in the Southeast United States and abroad.

The group's awards and nominations include:

- 2015, Nashville Business Journal, "Best in Business"
- 2015, Historical Commission of Nashville, Historic Preservation Award
- 2016, Fortune magazine, "100 Fastest-Growing Inner City Businesses (#3)
- 2016, Nashville Business Journal, "Highest Corporate Giving"
- 2018, Nashville Scene, Third place, "Best Builder/Developer in Nashville"
- 2021, Urban Land Institute, "Best Private Sector Project" – East Greenway Park

The group's projects include:

- East Greenway Park is Aerial Development Group's 62-home, 10-acre urban neighborhood in Nashville, Tennessee. At the launch of the project Tennessee ranked #5 in the nation for highest rating of obesity related deaths. The community was designed as a case study to combat the obesity issue in Tennessee by encouraging an active and healthy lifestyle for residents and neighbors. Turner and her team accomplished this by building direct access for not only their development but the greater surrounding community, to Nashville's longest greenway Shelby Bottoms Greenway, at the base of the community. The project has street names such as "Go Run" to inspire people to have fun and exercise. Aerial put in hiking trails, sidewalks, incorporated community green spaces, play areas for kids, an outdoor gym and fire pits, neighborhood community garden, dog parks and at closing, every homeowner is given a new bike as encouragement to get outside and be active. The project won Urban Land Institute's Best Private Sector Project in Nashville for 2021.
- Peace Row in Shelby Hills, Nashville is a project that overlooks Music City, the Cumberland River and the Tennessee hills. Aerial designed the project as a case study for ecologically sensitive development building homes.
- The Aerial BVI: Aerial's first international project in Buck Island was restored after Hurricane Irma and Hurricane Maria hit the British Virgin Islands in September 2017.

=== Aerial Produced ===
Aerial Produced is a media production firm that promotes socially-motivated causes, people, and ideas. The group has created films that share with people how to get involved in different causes such as the recovery of areas and nations after natural and man-made disasters.

They won a Gold Stevie Award for their four-part web series Honduras After The Storm in 2021.

=== Aerial Recovery Group ===
Aerial Recovery Group responds to man-made and natural disasters in the US and abroad.

Their work to date includes:

- 2017 – Emergency Relief Following Hurricanes Irma and Maria
- 2019 – Emergency Relief Following Hurricane Dorian in Bahamas
- 2020 – Emergency Relief Following Tornado in Nashville, TN
- 2020 – Hurricanes and Flood Emergency Aid Response and Rescue Mission
- 2020 – Hurricane Laura Emergency Response in Louisiana
- 2021 – St. Vincent Volcano Eruption Emergency Aid Response
- 2021 – 7.2 Magnitude Earthquake in Haiti Emergency Rescue, Medical, and aid Missions
- 2021 – Tornado in Mayfield, Kentucky Disaster Management and Relief Coordination
- 2021 – Afghanistan Refugee Crisis, Humanitarian Aid Mission
- 2022 – Ukraine Orphan Rescue Mission following Russian Invasion

=== Aerial Properties ===
Aerial Properties is a multi-family residential real estate firm that works to redevelop apartment communities.

Examples of their work includes:

- The Hills, Marietta, Georgia
- The Adelade, Knoxville, Tennessee

=== The Aerial, BVI ===
Established in 2020, Aerial BVI is a private island resort in the British Virgin Islands. The island includes a sanctuary for rescued horses and ponies, called "Redemption Ranch".

=== G-FORCE ===
Turner is the founder of the G-FORCE group of entrepreneurs, which won the 2021 People's Choice Stevie Award for "Favorite New Product: Business-to-Business Service". G-FORCE has two podcasts, and hosts multiple retreats throughout the year for its members.

=== Aerial Global Community ===
Aerial Global Community is the non-profit arm of Aerial Group, and is a 501(c)(3) organization. Its film projects include:

- BVI Stronger: After Hurricane Irma and Hurricane Maria hit the British Virgin Islands in 2017, Turner and her team came in as first responders to help. Their projects included:
  - BVI Strong Story
  - Stories of Abaco
  - Honduras After the Storm
  - Hurricane Laura Vlogs, Louisiana
  - Survival Tips Series

Other projects have included:

- Heal the Heroes, a support program for military veterans
- Youth educational day programs – BVI
- Orphan rescue
