= Cobbham Crossroads, Georgia =

Unincorporated community in Georgia, USA

Cobbham Crossroads
- unincorporated community
- Interactive map of Cobbham Crossroads
- Coordinates: 33°33′10″N 82°26′14″W
- Country: United States
- State: Georgia
- County: McDuffie County

Cobbham Crossroads is an unincorporated community in McDuffie County and Columbia County, both located in Georgia. It is located in the area around the intersection of Fish Dam Rd, in McDuffie County, Georgia, and Poplar Springs Church Rd, in Columbia County, Georgia.
