= Burks Mountain =

Mountain in Georgia, United States

Coordinates: 33°37′08″N 82°13′08″W

Burks Mountain is an elevated area in Columbia County, Georgia. Its summit is 474 feet above sea level. It lies within a region of the Piedmont which is characterized mainly by a broad southwest-to-northeast area of felsic igneous and metamorphic rock such as gneiss, schist, granite, and phyllite, as mapped by J. H. Hetrich. Within the corresponding area dominated by felsic rock across the Savannah River in South Carolina, small bands of mafic rock such as amphibolite, and ultramafic rock such as dunite, soapstone, and serpentine are mapped by Horton and Dicken.

Hetrich does not separate the mafic or ultramafic rock areas of Burks Mountain from his map unit of undifferentiated felsic rock. A soil survey has mapped the site as Enon soil series, which occurs over mafic or intermediate rock. The ultramafic area is not large enough to have its own soil unit mapped.

Nevertheless, Burks Mountain has a particularly notable example of the Piedmont Ultramafic Barrens and Woodland community, with longleaf pine (usually associated with the Coastal Plain) growing alongside rare species such as Dixie Mountain Breadroot.
