= Heggie's Rock =

Natural landmark in Columbia County, Georgia

Heggie's Rock Preserve
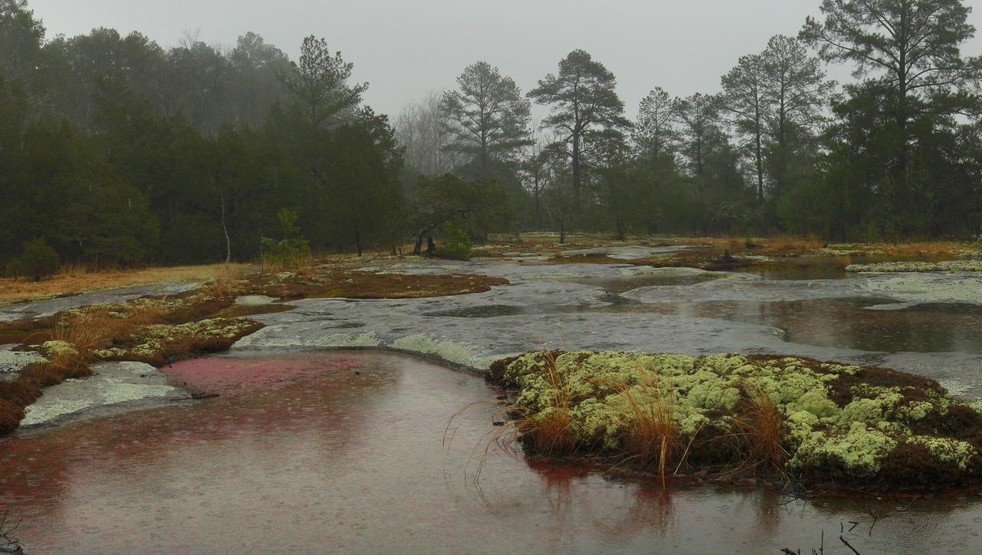
- Heggie's Rock (2010)

- Location within Georgia Location within the United States
- Location: Columbia County, Georgia, United States
- Coordinates: 33°32′29.8″N 82°15′13.1″W
- Area: 101 acres (41 ha)
- Governing body: The Nature Conservancy

U.S. National Natural Landmark
- Designated: 1980

Heggie's Rock is a large granite outcropping in Columbia County, Georgia, United States. Declared a National Natural Landmark in 1980, the property was purchased by The Nature Conservancy in 1983.

== Description ==
Heggie's Rock occupies approximately 130 acres (53 hectares) granite outcropping in Columbia County, Georgia, approximately 20 miles (32 km) from Augusta, Georgia. The outcropping rises approximately 70 feet (21 m) above the surrounding area, which is bordered by two streams, Benton Branch and Little Kiokee Creek, the latter of which flows into the Savannah River approximately 8 miles (13 km) downstream from the rock. In 1980, the area was deemed a National Natural Landmark. In 1983, The Nature Conservancy purchased 101 acres (41 hectares) of the rock, creating Heggie's Rock Preserve. In 1998, scientists at Heggie's Rock described a new genus and species of copepod found only at the rock.

Heggie's Rock is one of several large granite outcroppings in Georgia, along with Panola Mountain, Stone Mountain, and Arabia Mountain.

== See also ==
- List of National Natural Landmarks in Georgia
