= Columbia County, Georgia =

County in Georgia, United States

- County
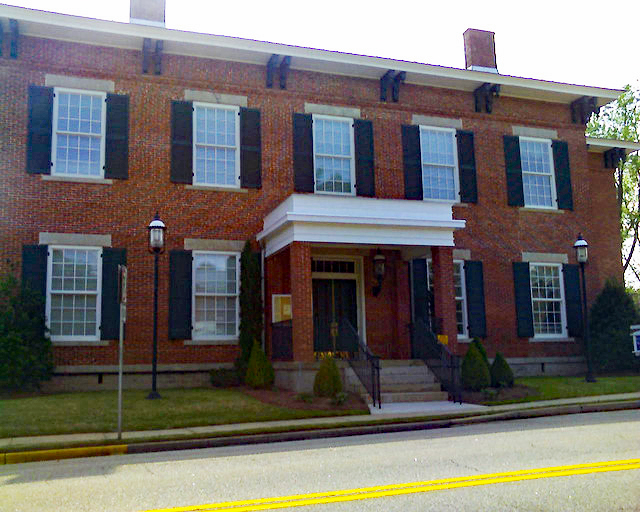
- Columbia County Courthouse in Appling

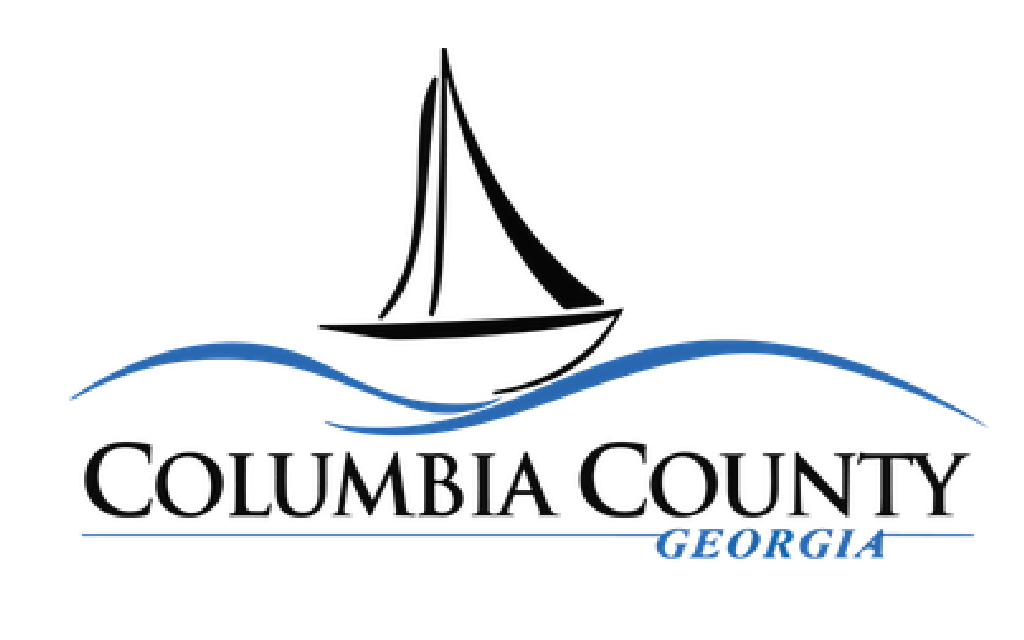
- Flag Logo

- Location within the U.S. state of Georgia
- Coordinates: 33°33′N 82°16′W
- Country: United States
- State: Georgia
- Founded: 1790; 236 years ago
- Named for: Columbia
- Seat: Appling (de jure); Evans (de facto)
- Largest community: Martinez

Area
  - Total: 308 sq mi (800 km^{2})
  - Land: 290 sq mi (750 km^{2})
  - Water: 18 sq mi (47 km^{2}) 5.7%

Population (2020)
  - Total: 156,010
  - Estimate (2025): 169,189 ▲
  - Density: 538/sq mi (208/km^{2})
- Time zone: UTC−5 (Eastern)
  - Summer (DST): UTC−4 (EDT)
- Congressional district: 12th
- Website: www.columbiacountyga.gov

Columbia County is a county located in the east central portion of the U.S. state of Georgia. As of the 2020 census, the population was 156,010. The legal county seat is Appling, but the de facto seat of county government is Evans.

Columbia County is included in the Augusta metropolitan area. It is located along the Savannah River.

== History ==
Columbia County, the 12th county formed in Georgia, was created by an act of the Legislature of Georgia on December 10, 1790, from Richmond County.

=== Prehistory and the colonial era ===
This area along the Savannah River had been inhabited for thousands of years by various cultures of indigenous peoples. The area had been home to the historic Muscogee-speaking Creek; Yuchi, people speaking a language isolate; and Iroquoian-speaking Cherokee for years prior to European colonization. The Yuchi had moved south from Tennessee because of pressure from the Cherokee, who continued to move into the Piedmont and soon dominated the Native American tribes. One of the oldest archaeological sites in the nation to contain pottery can be found on Stallings Island.

During the Colonial era, settlement of what would become Columbia County occurred primarily due to colonists settling at the second city in Georgia, Augusta, located on the Fall Line. When the British Province of Georgia became a crown colony in 1755 and was divided into parishes, the area around Augusta became St. Paul's Parish. The primary areas of settlement were Augusta; Wrightsboro (a Quaker settlement named for James Wright, the royal governor); and Brownsborough, which was near the present-day location of North Columbia Elementary School.

Because the Church of England was the established church in the province, it was against the law for anyone to preach contrary to its doctrines. Influenced by the Great Awakening in New England, in 1772 Daniel Marshall established Kiokee Baptist Church, the first Baptist church in Georgia. The church was located below Brownsborough along the Kiokee Creek in present-day Appling. Born in Connecticut, Marshall had been raised as a Presbyterian. He had become a Baptist and preached in the Carolinas before coming to Georgia, where he was arrested. Baptist preachers and their converts continued to flourish, and in Virginia their influence helped shape the young James Madison's ideas on religious freedom, which he incorporated into the new Constitution. Marshall later served in the militia during the American Revolutionary War. During the 19th century and the Second Great Awakening, the Baptists became well established in Georgia and other southern states. The Baptists offered congregational participation to slaves and approved them and free blacks as preachers, leading to the growth in black membership in the church.

=== American Revolutionary War ===
Two small battles occurred in what would become the county during the Revolutionary War between Patriot Militia and Tories; the area was then primarily frontier and loyalties were badly divided. Legend has it that a small band of Patriots sought refuge from marauding Tories at the county's most dramatic geological feature, Heggie's Rock. One of these fights occurred on September 11, 1781, between the forces of Elijah Clarke and a band of Tories and British Regular soldiers.

George Walton, the Virginia-born statesman who signed the Declaration of Independence, resided in what would become Columbia County, as did William Few and Abraham Baldwin. They were delegates to the Federal Convention that framed the United States Constitution.

=== Formation of Columbia County ===
Just before and immediately after the Revolution, numerous Virginians and North Carolinians migrated to the frontier of Georgia above Augusta, including the area around Brownsborough. After the Revolution, residents disagreed as to whether Augusta or Brownsborough should be the county seat of Richmond County. At the insistence of William Few, the county was partitioned. The new county formed from Richmond was named "Columbia" (for the origin of the name see Columbia); this did not end the controversy about location of the county seat. The citizens of Columbia County turned to arguing among themselves. Supporters built one courthouse in Brownsborough, and those of Cobbham built another. The courthouse at Cobbham was used; and Brownsborough in short order ceased to exist. In 1793, part of the county was taken, combined with part of Wilkes County, and formed into Warren County.

Around 1799, William Appling deeded a tract of land to the county for the purpose of building a courthouse. It was near Kiokee Creek and the Baptist Church which Marshall had founded. A courthouse was constructed, and served the county until around 1808. The small town that existed around the church and courthouse came to be known as "Columbia Courthouse." In 1809, the Baptist congregation left the town and constructed a new meeting house (a building which survives) several miles away near the junction of Kiokee and Greenbrier creeks. That same year, construction began on a new courthouse, which was completed in 1812. In 1816, Columbia Courthouse was chartered as the Town of Appling, named for the Appling family who had donated the land to the county, and for Colonel John Appling, a local resident who died in a campaign against the Seminole.

=== Early 19th century ===
Appling was the political, educational, social, and religious center of the county. Near Appling were located Mt. Carmel Academy and Columbia Institute. Mt. Carmel Academy was run by the famous Southern educator, Moses Waddel; it was here that John C. Calhoun and William H. Crawford were educated. Columbia Institute was started by a certain gentleman going by the surname Bush; he was none other than the Bushnell of Revolutionary War submariner fame. During the Georgia Gold Rush of the 1820s, some successful prospecting and mining occurred in Columbia County.

The 1830s were a period of major infrastructure projects and the coming of the railroad. When the Georgia Railroad was established, the judges determined that having trains' passing near Appling would disturb their proceedings; they insisted that the railway line that was built in the county from Atlanta to Augusta pass well below Appling. Construction of the Augusta Canal in the 1830s required Columbia County's cooperation, as the beginning of the canal and the locks were within the county.

In 1855, the Courthouse in Appling received a major overhaul, and after the remodeling was complete, the building was in more or less its present form. Despite the extensive project, builders retained the shell of the 1809–1812 building.

=== American Civil War ===
Plantation agriculture based on slave labor was the major force of the economy in the county prior to the American Civil War. Cotton production had expanded dramatically after the invention of the cotton gin, which enabled the cultivation of short-staple cotton in the upland areas. Numerous vast plantations existed, the central houses of some of which still exist. Thousands of slaves were brought to the county for labor. At times the slave population outnumbered the free white population.

When Georgia seceded from the United States, George Walker Crawford, a native son of Columbia County, presided over the Secession Convention. He had previously been elected as the only Whig governor of the State. Men from the county served in several companies, among them the Hamilton Rangers and the Ramsey Guards, some in the 48th Georgia Volunteer Infantry Regiment, and some in the 22nd; almost all in Wright's Brigade. The troops assembled in front of the courthouse, then boarded trains at the depots: Berzelia, Sawdust, Dearing, and Thomson. No fighting occurred in the county during the war; nor was it directly in General Sherman's path. According to some family stories, some Union cavalry scouts or bummers entered the county. Near the war's end, the remnants of the Confederate treasury were taken through Columbia County from Augusta to where the Chennault Raid occurred in neighboring Lincoln County.

The war took a heavy toll on the white male population of the county; a plaque behind the bench in the main Courtroom bears the names of Columbia County's Confederate dead. During Reconstruction, the county was subject to military occupation. Because of significant Ku Klux Klan violence in the late 1860s, it was attached to a special district including Warren, Wilkes, and Oglethorpe counties. Additional Union forces were sent there to try to suppress the insurgents and their vigilante crimes against freedmen. They had been steadily reported by the Freedmen's Bureau, whose reports included a mob lynching of a freedman in Appling in July 1866.

=== Late 19th century ===
The railroad brought increased trade and population to Thomson. In 1870, the part of Columbia County which included Thomson, Dearing, and Wrightsboro, the 12,000 acre settlement established in 1768 by Colonial Governor James Wright as a settlement for displaced Quakers from North Carolina, was combined with parts of Warren County to form McDuffie County—named after South Carolina's U.S. Senator: George McDuffie. Thomson became the county seat of the newly formed county.

On March 20, 1875, Appling suffered severe damage during a tornado. It never regained its former wealth and position in the county before the Civil War.

During Reconstruction, the legislature passed an act to establish a public school system for the first time. Like the rest of the state, the county developed segregated schools. The new communities of Harlem and Grovetown grew up. Harlem arose in the 1880s when a disgruntled railroad employee named Hicks, angered by saloons and Sabbath breaking in Sawdust, moved along the tracks one mile east and set up a rival town, complete with its own depot. Sawdust was eclipsed by Harlem, losing its depot and being absorbed by the newer town in the 1920s. The city was named after Harlem, New York. Grovetown, named for Grove Baptist Church, developed as a summer resort in the 1880s for wealthy Augustans.

=== 20th century ===
The 20th century brought many changes to the county, with new technologies and modernization. In 1917, Harlem was badly damaged by fire. Bringing electricity to the county began. Men from Columbia County answered the call of duty and served in both World Wars. Prior to World War II, the county was still primarily agricultural; it had escaped the boll weevil infestation that destroyed cotton crops in Mississippi and other parts of the South. The US Army built Camp (later Fort) Gordon, taking over a large portion of Richmond County and parts of Columbia, McDuffie, and Jefferson. The Army's keeping the fort after WWII created a new population and economic center for the county. During the 1950s, the Clarks Hill Dam was constructed, submerging considerable land in northern Columbia County under the new reservoir. It prompted new residential development around the lake.

Between 1950 and 1990, the population increased dramatically. Agriculture declined, as farmland was redeveloped as suburban housing and community centers for persons employed in Augusta. Numerous personnel stationed at Fort Gordon eventually settled in Columbia County. During the 1960s, the schools were integrated largely without incident under the leadership of Superintendent John Pierce Blanchard. The unincorporated communities of Martinez (formerly Lulaville, named after a Cuban doctor) and Evans (possibly named after Confederate General Clement A. Evans) became the population centers of the county, since they were located nearest to Augusta.

During the 1980s and 1990s and demographic shifts, Evans gradually became the de facto county seat, as the Columbia County Government Center and the Government Complex Addition were built there to serve the growing population in the county's eastern areas. Court functions remained in Appling since Georgia state law required that superior court sessions must be held at the county seat and courthouse of each county at least twice a year. In 1998, the legislature changed the law to allow counties with unincorporated county seats to hold court sessions at annexes or satellite courthouses. With the 1993 passage of legislation requiring incorporated cities to provide at least three municipal services, Appling was not able to maintain its status as an incorporated city. (There was question as to whether it was ever incorporated.) Appling was one of 187 inactive cities in Georgia that lost its charter on June 1, 1995. Today it is nearly a dead town. Following these changes, the county proceeded to build an expansive Courthouse Annex in Evans, completed in 2001. Appling retains its status as de jure county seat, but all governmental functions are carried out in Evans.

Historic sites in Appling include the Courthouse and Jail, the Marshall Monument, and various places associated with Kiokee Baptist Church. Other sites in the county include Stevens Creek Dam and Canal Locks, the birthplace of the comedian Oliver Hardy in Harlem, and various cemeteries.

== Geography ==
According to the U.S. Census Bureau, the county has a total area of 308 square miles (800 km^{2}), of which 290 square miles (750 km^{2}) is land and 18 square miles (47 km^{2}) (5.7%) is water. The county is located in the Piedmont region of the state just above the fall line of the eastern United States.

The southern three-quarters of Columbia County is located in the Middle Savannah River sub-basin of the Savannah River basin. A very small corner in the northeast of the county, west of Clarks Hill, is located in the Upper Savannah River sub-basin of the larger Savannah River basin. The northern portion of Columbia County, north of Appling, is located in the Little River sub-basin of the same Savannah River basin, while the southwestern corner of the county, south of Harlem, is located in the Brier Creek sub-basin of the Savannah River basin.

=== Adjacent counties ===
- Richmond County (southeast)
- McDuffie County (west)
- Lincoln County (northwest)
- McCormick County, South Carolina (north)
- Edgefield County, South Carolina (northeast)

=== Bodies of water ===
- Clarks Hill Lake (Strom Thurmond Lake)
- Savannah River
- Kiokee Creek
- Little Kiokee Creek
- Euchee Creek
- Steiner Creek
- Tudor Branch
- Greenbrier Creek
- Boggy Gut Creek
- Cobb Creek
- Crawford Creek
- Reed Creek
- Sandy Run Creek

=== Geological formations ===
- Heggie's Rock
- Burks Mountain
- Mount Carmel

== Communities ==
=== Cities ===
- Grovetown
- Harlem

=== Census-designated places ===
- Appling
- Evans
- Martinez

=== Unincorporated communities ===
- Berzelia
- Cobbham
- Sawdust
- Snead
- Winfield
- Cobbham Crossroads

== Demographics ==
Historical population
| Census | Pop. | Note | %± |
|---|---|---|---|
| 1800 | 8,345 | | — |
| 1810 | 11,242 | | 34.7% |
| 1820 | 12,695 | | 12.9% |
| 1830 | 12,606 | | −0.7% |
| 1840 | 11,356 | | −9.9% |
| 1850 | 11,961 | | 5.3% |
| 1860 | 11,860 | | −0.8% |
| 1870 | 13,529 | | 14.1% |
| 1880 | 10,465 | | −22.6% |
| 1890 | 11,281 | | 7.8% |
| 1900 | 10,653 | | −5.6% |
| 1910 | 12,328 | | 15.7% |
| 1920 | 11,718 | | −4.9% |
| 1930 | 8,793 | | −25.0% |
| 1940 | 9,433 | | 7.3% |
| 1950 | 9,525 | | 1.0% |
| 1960 | 13,423 | | 40.9% |
| 1970 | 22,327 | | 66.3% |
| 1980 | 40,118 | | 79.7% |
| 1990 | 66,031 | | 64.6% |
| 2000 | 89,288 | | 35.2% |
| 2010 | 124,053 | | 38.9% |
| 2020 | 156,010 | | 25.8% |
| 2025 (est.) | 169,189 | ▲ | 8.4% |
U.S. Decennial Census; 1790-1880 1890-1910; 1920-1930 1930-1940; 1940-1950 1960-1980; 1980-2000 2010

=== Racial and ethnic composition ===
Columbia County, Georgia – Racial and ethnic composition Note: the US Census treats Hispanic/Latino as an ethnic category. This table excludes Latinos from the racial categories and assigns them to a separate category. Hispanics/Latinos may be of any race.
| Race / Ethnicity (NH = Non-Hispanic) | Pop 1980 | Pop 1990 | Pop 2000 | Pop 2010 | Pop 2020 | % 1980 | % 1990 | % 2000 | % 2010 | % 2020 |
|---|---|---|---|---|---|---|---|---|---|---|
| White alone (NH) | 33,199 | 56,141 | 72,438 | 91,517 | 99,111 | 82.75% | 85.02% | 81.13% | 73.77% | 63.53% |
| Black or African American alone (NH) | 5,841 | 7,239 | 9,917 | 18,084 | 27,621 | 14.56% | 10.96% | 11.11% | 14.58% | 17.70% |
| Native American or Alaska Native alone (NH) | 57 | 150 | 262 | 350 | 354 | 0.14% | 0.23% | 0.29% | 0.28% | 0.23% |
| Asian alone (NH) | 383 | 1,518 | 2,985 | 4,726 | 7,102 | 0.95% | 2.30% | 3.34% | 3.81% | 4.55% |
| Native Hawaiian or Pacific Islander alone (NH) | x | x | 71 | 185 | 271 | x | x | 0.08% | 0.15% | 0.17% |
| Other race alone (NH) | 101 | 21 | 140 | 213 | 897 | 0.25% | 0.03% | 0.16% | 0.17% | 0.57% |
| Mixed race or Multiracial (NH) | x | x | 1,162 | 2,803 | 8,796 | x | x | 1.30% | 2.26% | 5.64% |
| Hispanic or Latino (any race) | 537 | 962 | 2,313 | 6,175 | 11,858 | 1.34% | 1.46% | 2.59% | 4.98% | 7.60% |
| Total | 40,118 | 66,031 | 89,288 | 124,053 | 156,010 | 100.00% | 100.00% | 100.00% | 100.00% | 100.00% |

=== 2020 census ===
As of the 2020 census, the county had a population of 156,010. The median age was 36.7 years. 26.4% of residents were under the age of 18 and 14.3% of residents were 65 years of age or older. For every 100 females there were 94.3 males, and for every 100 females age 18 and over there were 91.5 males age 18 and over. 85.1% of residents lived in urban areas, while 14.9% lived in rural areas.

The racial makeup of the county was 65.4% White, 18.1% Black or African American, 0.3% American Indian and Alaska Native, 4.6% Asian, 0.2% Native Hawaiian and Pacific Islander, 2.5% from some other race, and 8.8% from two or more races. Hispanic or Latino residents of any race comprised 7.6% of the population.

There were 55,449 households in the county, of which 39.2% had children under the age of 18 living with them and 22.4% had a female householder with no spouse or partner present. About 19.4% of all households were made up of individuals and 7.8% had someone living alone who was 65 years of age or older.

There were 58,640 housing units, of which 5.4% were vacant. Among occupied housing units, 77.2% were owner-occupied and 22.8% were renter-occupied. The homeowner vacancy rate was 1.6% and the rental vacancy rate was 7.0%.

== Government and politics ==
As of the 2020s, Columbia County is a strongly Republican voting county, voting 62% for Donald Trump in 2024. Prior to 1948, Columbia County was strongly Democratic in presidential elections as a part of the Solid South. Starting with the 1948 election, it began to break away from the Democratic Party as the party became more supportive of civil rights. It voted in line with the state as a whole from 1952 to 1976, but was one of the few counties Ronald Reagan won statewide in 1980. Since then, it has become a Republican Party stronghold. Underlining this, Jimmy Carter is the last Democrat to manage even 40 percent of the county's vote.

For elections to the United States House of Representatives, Columbia County is part of Georgia's 12th congressional district, currently represented by Rick Allen. For elections to the Georgia State Senate, Columbia County is divided between districts 23 and 24. For elections to the Georgia House of Representatives, Columbia County is part of districts 123, 125, 127 and 131.

United States presidential election results for Columbia County, Georgia
| Year | Republican | | Democratic | | Third party(ies) | |
| Year | No. | % | No. | % | No. | % |
|---|---|---|---|---|---|---|
| 1880 | 0 | 0.00% | 244 | 100.00% | 0 | 0.00% |
| 1884 | 0 | 0.00% | 402 | 100.00% | 0 | 0.00% |
| 1888 | 0 | 0.00% | 397 | 98.51% | 6 | 1.49% |
| 1892 | 101 | 4.75% | 451 | 21.22% | 1,573 | 74.02% |
| 1896 | 401 | 67.39% | 192 | 32.27% | 2 | 0.34% |
| 1900 | 42 | 15.67% | 215 | 80.22% | 11 | 4.10% |
| 1904 | 2 | 0.60% | 189 | 56.76% | 142 | 42.64% |
| 1908 | 12 | 3.51% | 144 | 42.11% | 186 | 54.39% |
| 1912 | 2 | 0.74% | 234 | 86.99% | 33 | 12.27% |
| 1916 | 6 | 1.10% | 521 | 95.60% | 18 | 3.30% |
| 1920 | 0 | 0.00% | 476 | 100.00% | 0 | 0.00% |
| 1924 | 47 | 15.67% | 213 | 71.00% | 40 | 13.33% |
| 1928 | 234 | 45.61% | 279 | 54.39% | 0 | 0.00% |
| 1932 | 11 | 2.04% | 528 | 97.96% | 0 | 0.00% |
| 1936 | 34 | 4.86% | 659 | 94.14% | 7 | 1.00% |
| 1940 | 46 | 6.79% | 627 | 92.61% | 4 | 0.59% |
| 1944 | 72 | 12.41% | 508 | 87.59% | 0 | 0.00% |
| 1948 | 59 | 5.57% | 164 | 15.47% | 837 | 78.96% |
| 1952 | 530 | 38.43% | 849 | 61.57% | 0 | 0.00% |
| 1956 | 463 | 34.84% | 866 | 65.16% | 0 | 0.00% |
| 1960 | 1,155 | 49.25% | 1,190 | 50.75% | 0 | 0.00% |
| 1964 | 2,575 | 64.33% | 1,428 | 35.67% | 0 | 0.00% |
| 1968 | 1,636 | 34.46% | 905 | 19.06% | 2,207 | 46.48% |
| 1972 | 4,839 | 83.65% | 946 | 16.35% | 0 | 0.00% |
| 1976 | 3,423 | 42.27% | 4,674 | 57.73% | 0 | 0.00% |
| 1980 | 6,293 | 52.71% | 5,335 | 44.69% | 310 | 2.60% |
| 1984 | 12,294 | 76.74% | 3,727 | 23.26% | 0 | 0.00% |
| 1988 | 16,401 | 77.75% | 4,617 | 21.89% | 76 | 0.36% |
| 1992 | 16,657 | 59.07% | 7,115 | 25.23% | 4,428 | 15.70% |
| 1996 | 21,291 | 67.18% | 8,601 | 27.14% | 1,801 | 5.68% |
| 2000 | 26,660 | 74.04% | 8,969 | 24.91% | 379 | 1.05% |
| 2004 | 35,549 | 75.31% | 11,442 | 24.24% | 212 | 0.45% |
| 2008 | 39,322 | 70.89% | 15,703 | 28.31% | 441 | 0.80% |
| 2012 | 41,765 | 70.70% | 16,451 | 27.85% | 855 | 1.45% |
| 2016 | 43,085 | 66.07% | 18,887 | 28.96% | 3,235 | 4.96% |
| 2020 | 50,013 | 62.04% | 29,232 | 36.26% | 1,375 | 1.71% |
| 2024 | 53,657 | 62.45% | 31,624 | 36.81% | 639 | 0.74% |

United States Senate election results for Columbia County, Georgia2
| Year | Republican | | Democratic | | Third party(ies) | |
| Year | No. | % | No. | % | No. | % |
|---|---|---|---|---|---|---|
| 2020 | 50,220 | 62.85% | 27,759 | 34.74% | 1,928 | 2.41% |
| 2020 | 45,667 | 63.28% | 26,497 | 36.72% | 0 | 0.00% |

United States Senate election results for Columbia County, Georgia3
| Year | Republican | | Democratic | | Third party(ies) | |
| Year | No. | % | No. | % | No. | % |
|---|---|---|---|---|---|---|
| 2020 | 28,606 | 36.03% | 16,245 | 20.46% | 34,554 | 43.52% |
| 2020 | 45,588 | 63.20% | 26,545 | 36.80% | 0 | 0.00% |
| 2022 | 40,172 | 62.38% | 22,965 | 35.66% | 1,257 | 1.95% |
| 2022 | 36,331 | 62.67% | 21,643 | 37.33% | 0 | 0.00% |

Georgia Gubernatorial election results for Columbia County
| Year | Republican | | Democratic | | Third party(ies) | |
| Year | No. | % | No. | % | No. | % |
|---|---|---|---|---|---|---|
| 2022 | 43,437 | 67.27% | 20,617 | 31.93% | 518 | 0.80% |

=== Moves toward incorporation ===
For more than a decade, there have been discussions by county officials to incorporate the county into a city. This issue first became moot in 1996 when the city of Augusta and Richmond County consolidated their governments. A state law mandating three mile buffer zones between cities effectively halted any efforts for Columbia County to incorporate, as it was contiguous to Augusta-Richmond County.

In 2005, talks of incorporating the county into a city resurfaced when the Georgia state legislature abolished the three mile buffer zone, thus allowing Sandy Springs in North Fulton County (contiguous to Atlanta) to become a city. Columbia County Commission Chairman Ron Cross led a campaign to bring the idea of county incorporation back to life. However, it was referred to as "consolidation," since counties in Georgia alone cannot incorporate, but can rather consolidate with an existing municipality within the county. The plan was to hold a referendum to incorporate the de facto county seat, Evans (currently a census-designated place), as a city and then simultaneously consolidate it with Columbia County.

The initiative drew strong opposition from officials in Harlem and Grovetown, the county's only municipalities, citing that it would keep their cities from growing. The word "consolidation" also had an immediate negative connotation with many residents of Columbia County, seeing the example of the Augusta-Richmond County plagued with unintended consequences. A straw poll conducted during the county Republican Party primary election, showed strong opposition to the idea countywide. The County Commission Chairman Ron Cross has vowed to keep the issue alive, but based on the negative sentiment from voters, it appears that at least for now, the idea of incorporation is back in hibernation.

== Education ==
Columbia County is served by the Columbia County School District, which covers all of Columbia County.

Private schools include Augusta Christian Schools, as well as the Episcopal Day School, Augusta Preparatory Day School, both in Martinez.

=== Elementary schools ===
- Baker Place Elementary School
- Bel-Air Elementary School (closed May 21, 2013)
- Blue Ridge Elementary School
- Brookwood Elementary School
- Cedar Ridge Elementary School
- Euchee Creek Elementary School
- Evans Elementary School
- Greenbrier Elementary School
- Grovetown Elementary School
- Lewiston Elementary School
- Martinez Elementary School
- North Columbia Elementary School
- North Harlem Elementary School
- Parkway Elementary School
- River Ridge Elementary School
- Riverside Elementary School
- South Columbia Elementary School
- Stevens Creek Elementary School
- Westmont Elementary School

=== Middle schools ===
- Columbia Middle School
- Evans Middle School
- Greenbrier Middle School
- Grovetown Middle School
- Harlem Middle School
- Lakeside Middle School
- Riverside Middle School
- Stallings Island Middle School

=== High schools ===
- Evans High School
- Greenbrier High School
- Grovetown High School
- Harlem High School
- Lakeside High School

=== Other education ===
- Crossroads Academy (alternative school)
- Augusta Christian Schools (private)
- Augusta Preparatory Day School (private)
- Evans Christian Academy (private)
- School for Arts Infused Learning (SAIL) (public charter school, K-8)
- Savanah River Academy (private)
- Avila Catholic Academy (private)
- Augusta Science Academy (private)

== Transportation ==
=== Major highways ===
- I-20 / SR 402 (unsigned)
- US 78 / US 278 / SR 10
- US 221
- SR 28
- SR 47
- SR 104
- SR 150
- SR 223
- SR 232
- SR 383
- SR 388

=== Pedestrians and cycling ===
- Augusta Canal Historic Trail
- Euchee Creek Greenway (Under construction)
- Evans to Locks Road Trail

The company BCycle has introduced the first bike share program to Columbia County.

== Notable people ==
- Nathan Crawford Barnett, Member of the Georgia House of Representatives and Georgia Secretary of State for over 30 years
- Oliver Hardy, (comedian, born in Harlem)
- Paul Hamilton Hayne, (poet and author)
- Henry Louis Benning, (Confederate general for whom Fort Benning was named. It was briefly renamed Fort Moore in May 2023.)
- William Few
- Abraham Baldwin
- George Walton
- George W. Crawford
- William H. Crawford, (presidential candidate in 1824)
- Thomas Watson, (populist leader and Georgia senator born in Thomson when it was still in Columbia County)
- George McDuffie, (South Carolina governor and senator in the early 19th century)
- Jesse Mercer, (a long-time preacher in the county for whom Mercer University is named)
- Ben Hayslip, (Grammy Nominated country music songwriter)
- Dave Haywood
- Charles Kelley, of Lady A from Columbia County, where there is now the Lady Antebellum pavilion.

== Sister city ==
Columbia County is twinned with:

- Nowy Sącz, Poland

== See also ==
- Central Savannah River Area
- National Register of Historic Places listings in Columbia County, Georgia
- Professional Disc Golf Association
- List of counties in Georgia
