= Autney, Georgia =

Unincorporated community in Georgia, U.S.

Coordinates: 33°20′51″N 82°26′20″W

Autney is an unincorporated community in McDuffie County, in the U.S. state of Georgia.

== History ==
A post office called Autney was established in 1888, and remained in operation until 1917. In 1900, the community had 53 inhabitants.
