= Augusta Canal =

Canal system in Georgia, US

- Historic Augusta Canal and Industrial District
- U.S. National Register of Historic Places
- U.S. National Historic Landmark District
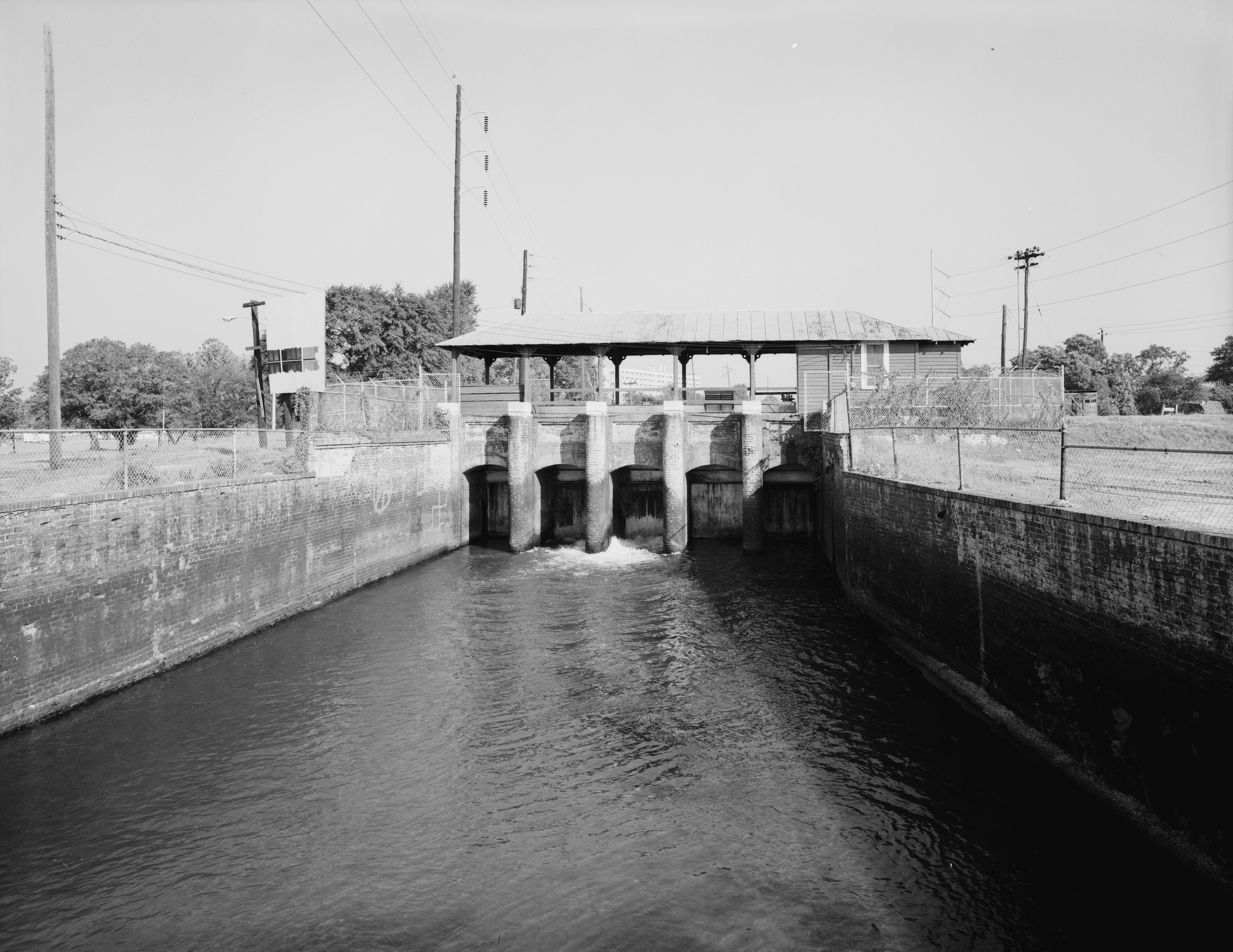
- Augusta Canal

- Location within Georgia Location within the United States
- Location: Augusta, Georgia / Columbia County, Georgia
- Coordinates: 33°30′08″N 81°59′57″W
- Area: 225 acres (91 ha)
- Built: 1845
- Architect: Multiple
- Architectural style: Romanesque
- NRHP reference No.: 71000285

Significant dates
- Added to NRHP: May 27, 1971
- Designated NHLD: December 22, 1977

The Augusta Canal is a historic canal located in Augusta, Georgia, United States. The canal is fed by the Savannah River and passes through three levels (approximately 13 miles (21 km) total) in suburban and urban Augusta before the water returns to the river at various locations. It was devised to harness the water power at the fall line of the Savannah River to drive mills, to provide transportation of goods, and to provide a municipal water supply. It remains in use for its original purposes of providing power, transport, and municipal water.

== History ==
=== 19th century ===
The Augusta Canal was initially completed in 1845 as a source of water, power, and transportation for the city of Augusta. It was one of the few successful industrial canals in the Southern United States. During the time of construction, the city's Canal Commission was headed by Henry Harford Cumming. Cumming personally paid railroad engineer John Edgar Thomson to conduct the initial survey for the project. In 1847, construction began on the first factory, a saw and gristmill at the present site of Enterprise Mill. The Augusta Manufacturing Company, a sprawling four-story textile "manufactory", soon followed. They would be the first of many factories built along the Augusta Canal.

By the time of the Civil War, Augusta was one of the few manufacturing centers in the South. The power and water transportation afforded by the canal were among the factors that led Confederate Col. George Washington Rains to select Augusta as the location for the Confederate Powderworks. The 28 buildings, which were the only ones designed, constructed, and paid for by the government of the Confederate States of America, stretched for 2 miles (3.2 km) along the Augusta Canal. Other war industries were established along or near the canal, making Augusta an important center for materiel.

As the Civil War moved into Georgia in 1864, there was fear that US General William Tecumseh Sherman's troops would move to attack Augusta and her massive gunpowder factory. But Sherman's march through the South left Augusta untouched. As a result, the city ended the war in reasonably better physical and economic condition than many Southern cities. The population had doubled and hard currency was available to finance recovery, including expansion of the canal.

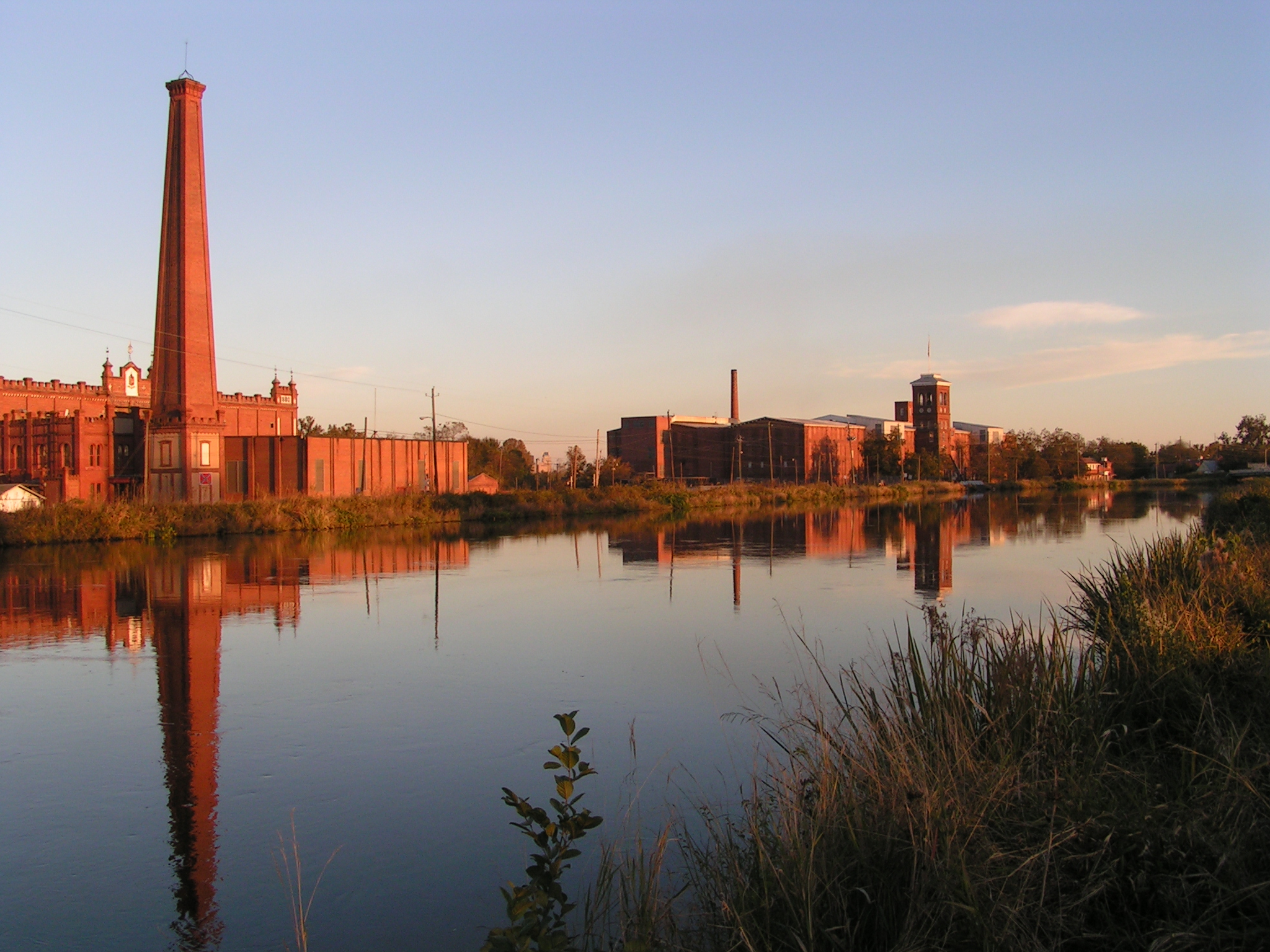
Historic Augusta Canal and Industrial District – Sibley and King mills

The canal was enlarged in 1875. A boom era saw the construction of the Enterprise Mill, King Mill, and Sibley Mill, the Lombard Ironworks; many other plants opened or expanded. Many people who lived on farms moved to the city to work at the mills, including women and children. The factories led to the rise of mill villages in their precincts.

In the 1890s, the city replaced its old water pumping station with impressive structure at mid-canal that is still used by the city of Augusta today. As the electric age began to dawn, Augusta began to turn the canal's falling water power to drive the first electrical generation equipment. By 1892, Augusta boasted both electric streetcars and street lights — the first Southern city to have these amenities.

=== 20th century ===
Flooding was a big problem in Augusta during the early 20th century. Following major floods in the 1920s and 1930s, the Federal Works Progress Administration deployed hundreds of workers to make repairs and improvements, build a new spillway and to straighten the canal.

By the mid-20th century, the canal came into a period of neglect. Textile factories began to close and the city's industrial activity began to shift south of the city. At one point in the 1960s, city officials considered draining the canal to build a superhighway.

Flickers of interest in reviving the Augusta Canal began appearing in the 1970s. A state park was proposed, but never materialized. In 1989, the state legislature created the Augusta Canal Authority, the body that has jurisdiction over the canal today. In 1993, the Authority issued a comprehensive Master Plan, outlining the Canal's development potential. In 1996, the US Congress designated the Augusta Canal a National Heritage Area, the first such designation in Georgia.

=== 21st century ===
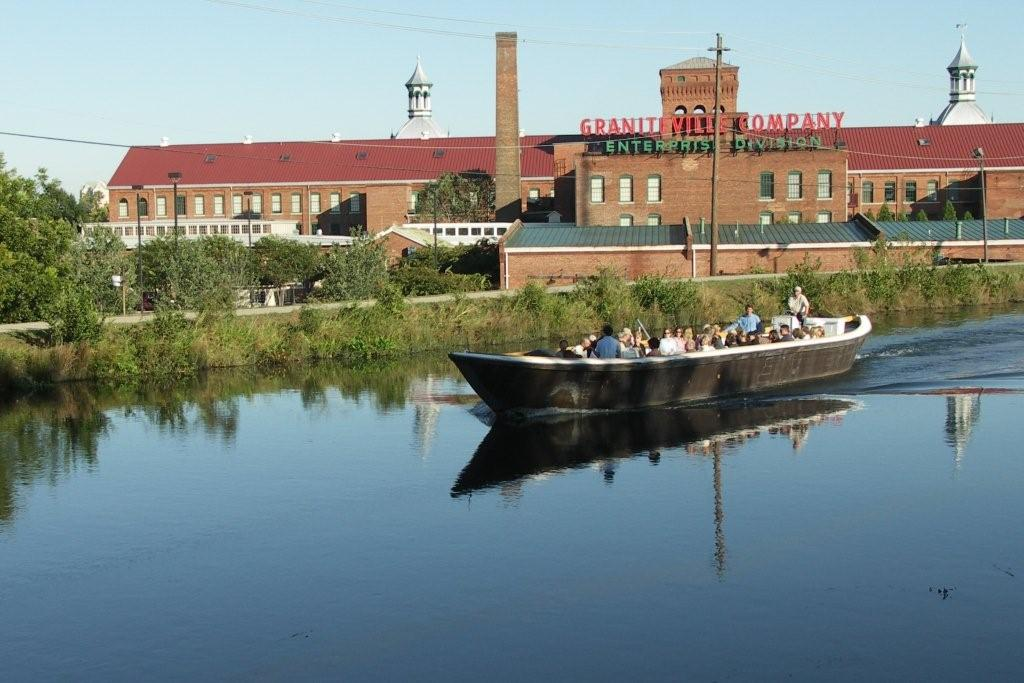
Augusta Canal tour departs from Enterprise Mill

The Augusta Canal Authority moved forward with its master plan. In 2003, the Augusta Canal Interpretive Center (now Discovery Center) opened in the revitalized Enterprise Mill. In late 2003 and early 2004, two modern-day Petersburg boats, inspired by the cargo vessels that once plied the canal with bales of cotton and farm goods, began operation for guided tours.

The King and the Sibley textile mills are now owned by the Augusta Canal Authority.

== National designations ==
The canal is, along with four historic industrial areas, part of the Historic Augusta Canal and Industrial District, which was named a National Historic Landmark in 1977. The Augusta Canal National Heritage Area was designated by Congress in 1996, the first designated National Heritage Area in Georgia. The Augusta Canal & Industrial District was designated as a National Historic Civil Engineering Landmark by the American Society of Civil Engineers in 2018.

== Today ==
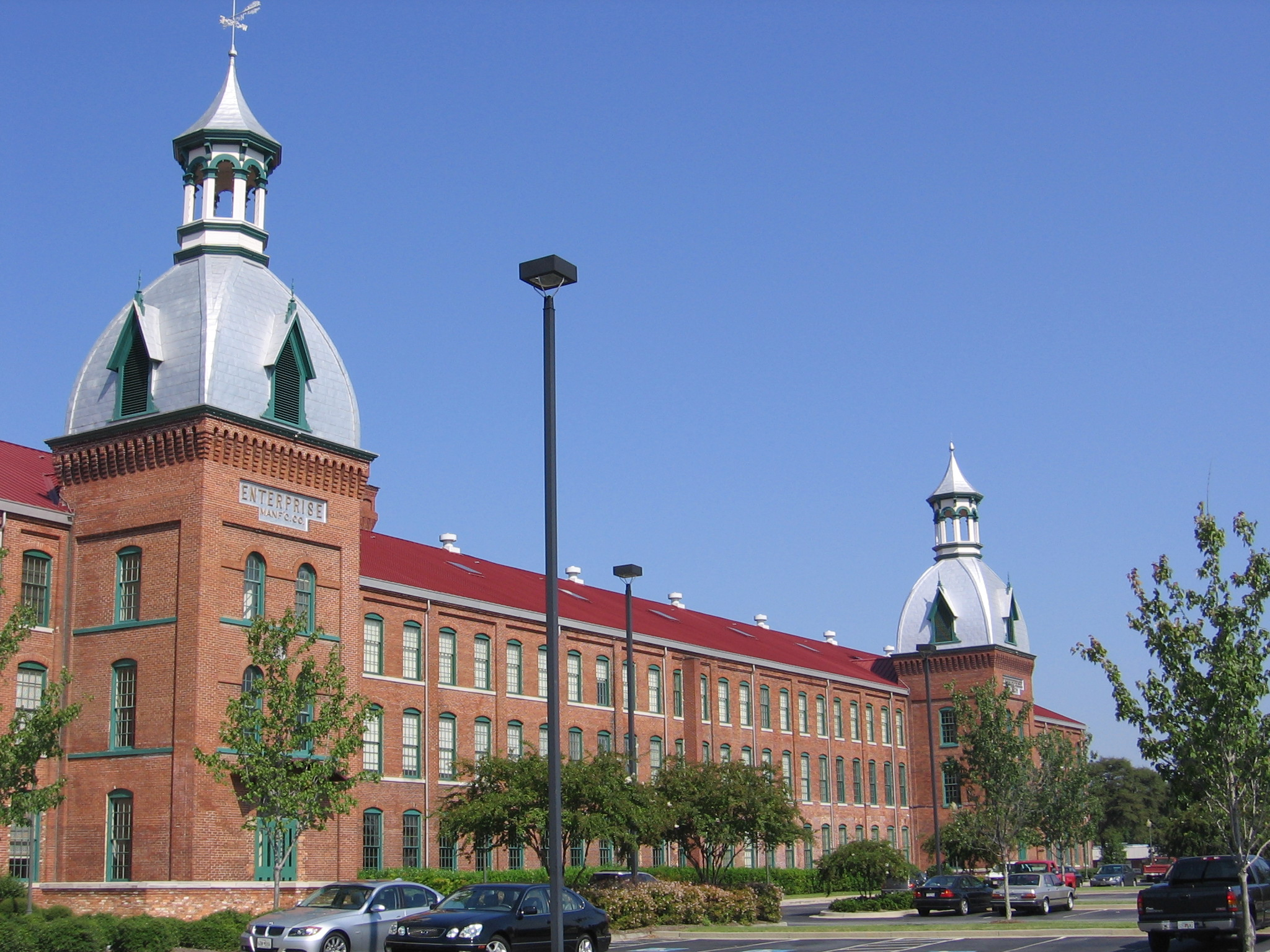
Enterprise Mill Augusta Georgia

The Augusta Canal is a principal source of drinking water in Augusta and is a centerpiece of the city. It also has been a focus of redevelopment. Textile mills such as the Enterprise and Sutherland mills have been converted to upscale offices and loft apartments. New projects, such as the Kroc Center and Canalside Apartments have been constructed. Other developments such as Harrisburg Canal Village, and Augusta Canal Mill Village trailhead are proposed or under construction.

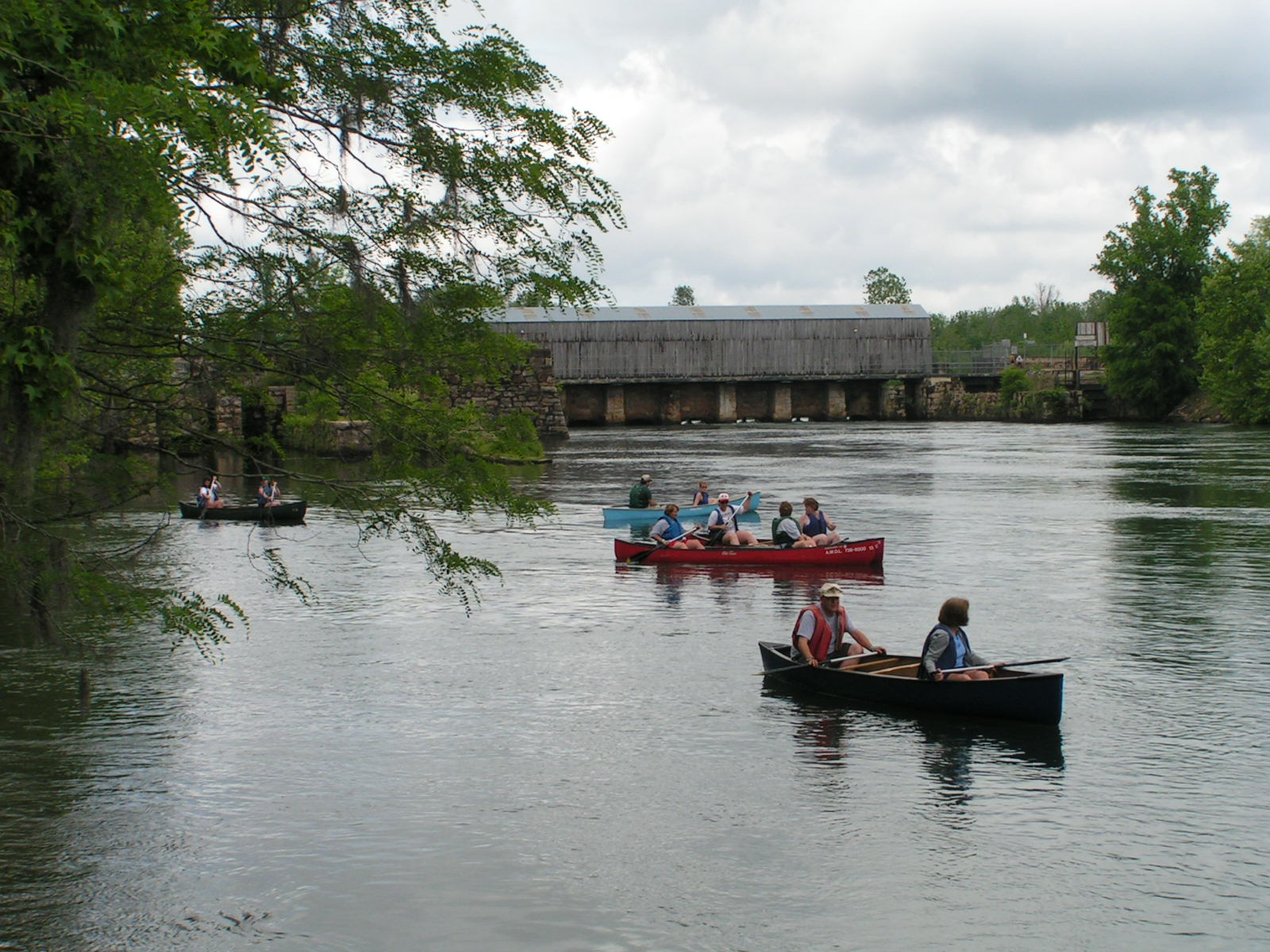
Canoes depart from Augusta Canal headgate area during Augusta Canal Cruise and Cookout 2004

The canal is best known today for its recreational facilities, including daily guided tours on electric tour boats, paddling and kayaking, and for its multi-use trail. The 7-mile-long (11 km) towpath on the canal's first level forms a backbone for the recreational trail system, complemented by newer trails including the River Levee Trail, Third Level Trail, and the Southern Off-Road Bicycle Association (SORBA) single-track mountain bike trail.

== Augusta Canal Discovery Center at Enterprise Mill ==
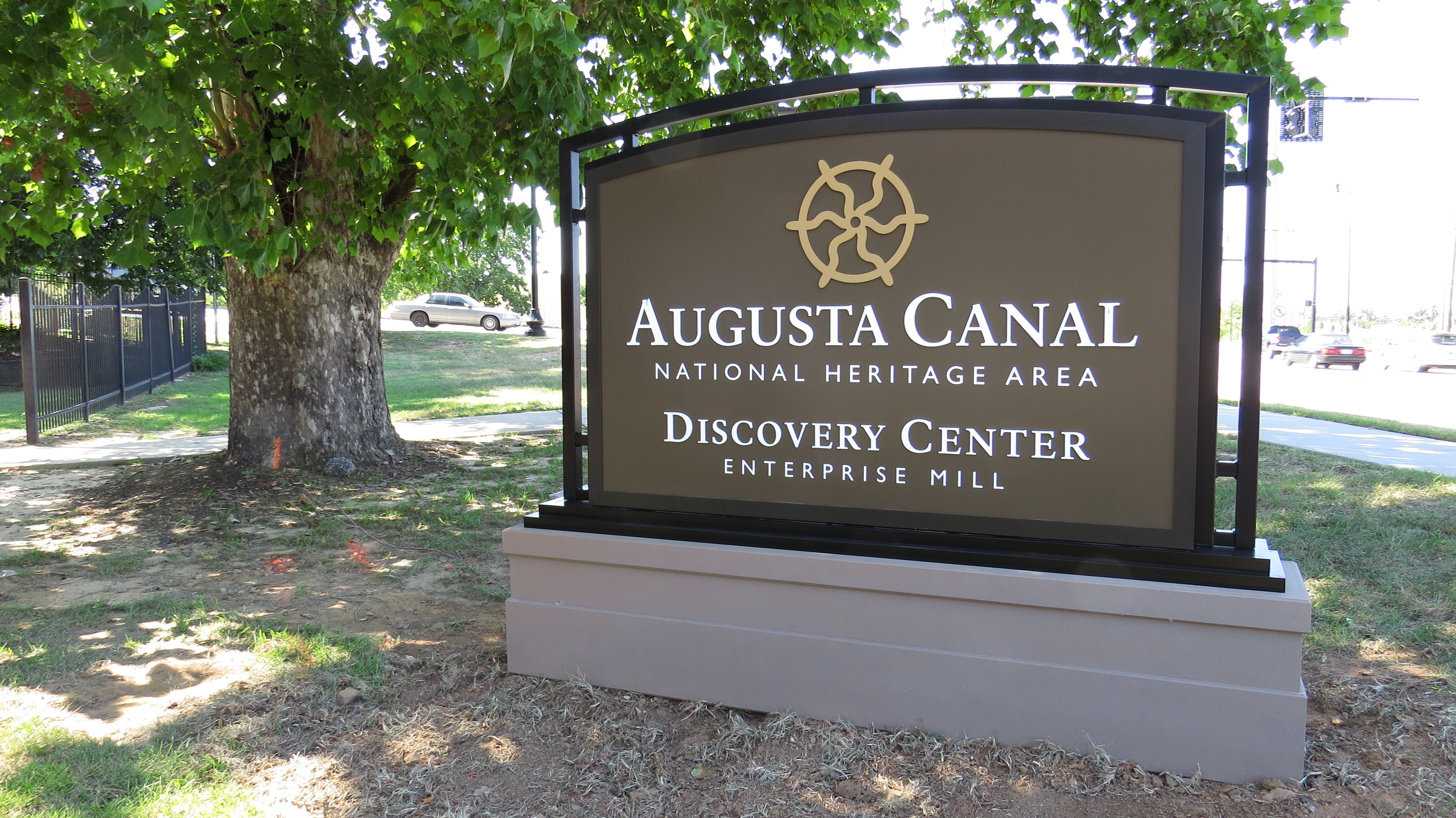
Main sign for Augusta Canal Discovery Center at corner of 15th and Greene Streets, Augusta GA installed in 2014

Enterprise Mill in Augusta is also the site of the Augusta Canal Discovery Center at Enterprise Mill (known as the Interpretive Center from 2003 to 2013). The interactive museum details how the canal was built and how it works, hydroelectricity, the history of the mills along the canal and the life of mill workers, and the 20th century decline of the mills and the effects on the canal. Boat tours of the Canal start from the Discovery Center.

== Crossings ==
Name	Carries
Augusta Canal Floodgates in Savannah Rapids Park	Augusta Canal Trail
Footbridge in Savannah Rapids Park	Augusta Canal Trail
Interstate 20 bridge	I-20 (Carl Sanders Highway)
Footbridge	Augusta Canal Trail
Footbridge	Augusta Canal Trail
William "Billy" L. Powell Jr. Bridge	SR 104 (Riverwatch Parkway)
Footbridge	Augusta Canal Trail
Eve Street bridge	Eve Street
Broad Street bridge	Broad Street
Butt Memorial Bridge	SR 4 (15th Street)
John C. Calhoun Expressway bridge	SR 28 (John C. Calhoun Expressway)
Hugh Lamar Hamilton Memorial Bridge	St. Sebastian Way
13th Street bridge	SR 4 (13th Street)
Walton Way bridge	Walton Way and railroad tracks of CSX
12th Street bridge	12th Street
11th Street bridge	11th Street
10th Street bridge	10th Street
D'Antignac Street / Bennett Lane bridge	D'Antignac Street / Bennett Lane
James Brown Boulevard bridge	James Brown Boulevard
8th Street bridge	8th Street

== See also ==
- Butt Memorial Bridge — carries 15th Street over the Augusta Canal
- History of Augusta, Georgia
- List of National Historic Landmarks in Georgia (U.S. state)
- National Register of Historic Places listings in Richmond County, Georgia
- National Register of Historic Places listings in Columbia County, Georgia
