= Butt Memorial Bridge =

Road bridge in Augusta, Georgia

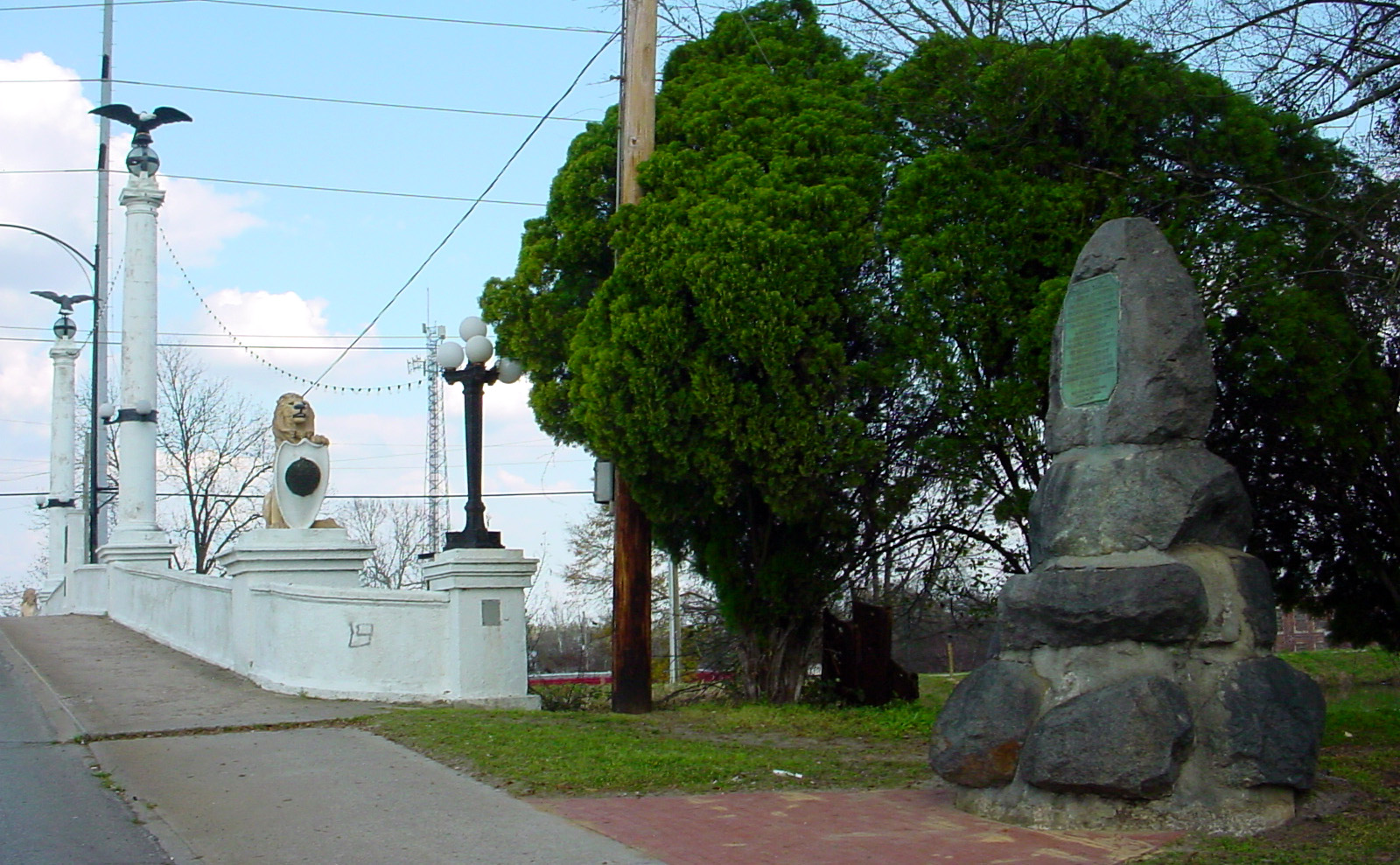
- Coordinates: 33.478525°N 81.984041°W
- Carries: 15th Street
- Crosses: Augusta Canal
- Locale: Augusta, Georgia

Characteristics
- Material: Stone

History
- Opened: 1914

Location
- Interactive map of Butt Memorial Bridge

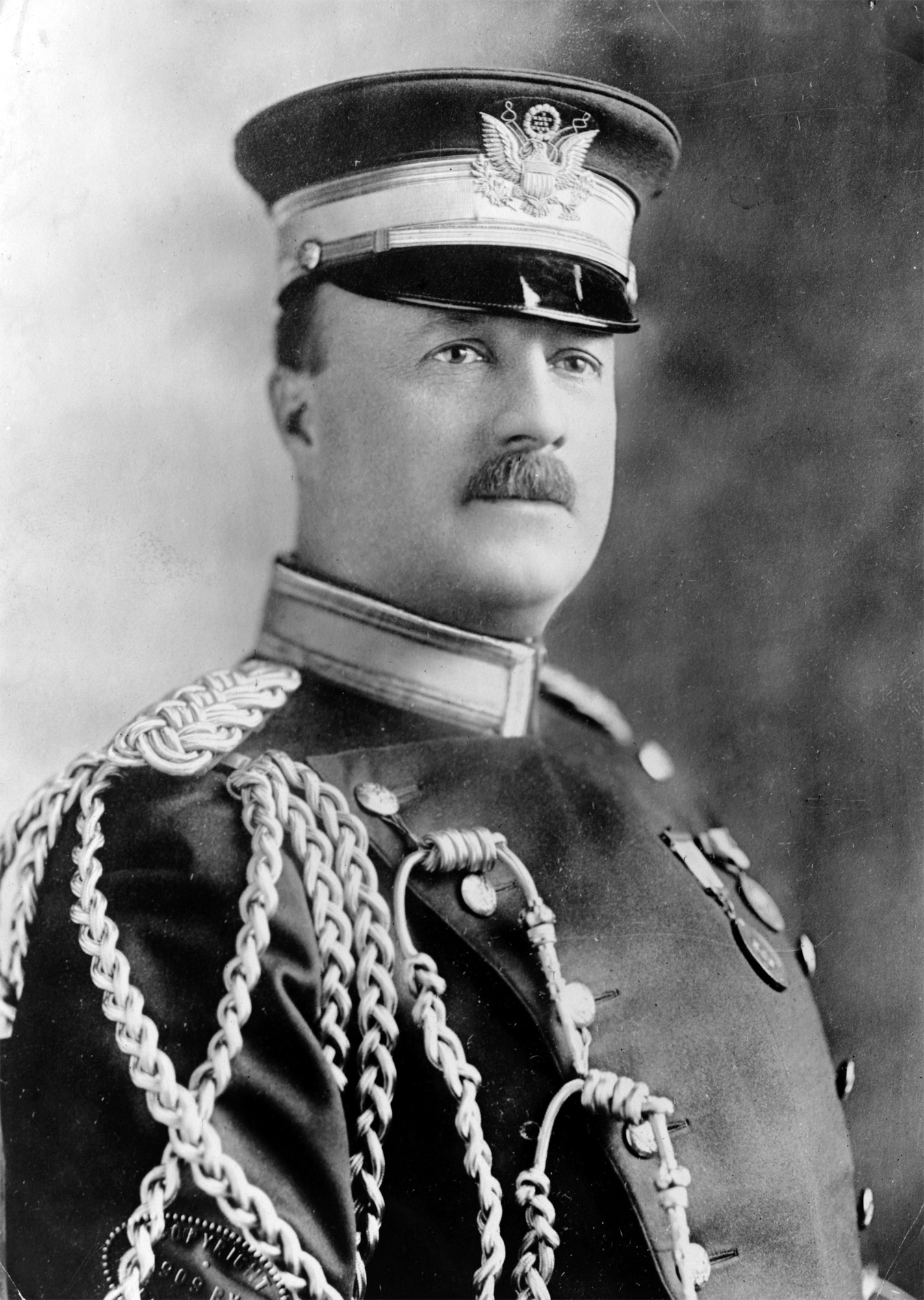
Archibald Willingham Butt

The Butt Memorial Bridge is a road bridge in Augusta, Georgia that carries 15th Street over the Augusta Canal. It is dedicated to Major Archibald Willingham Butt, born in Augusta and a victim of the sinking of RMS Titanic. The bridge was erected in 1914 and dedicated by President William Howard Taft, a personal friend of Butt. It is notable that the bridge was the first memorial erected to remember the Titanic disaster, and it stands today as the only memorial in Georgia dedicated to the disaster. The bridge is made of stone, featuring four pillars topped with bronze-banded globes placed over electric lights. Four lions with plaques adorn each side and end of the bridge, while lights are strung from one end of the bridge to the other. A memorial plaque is located on the center of the bridge, dedicated to Butt's memory.

The bridge was designed by William Henry Deacy, architect and Nisbet Wingfield, civil engineer. The bridge was fabricated by W. W. Leland Company.

== Preservation ==
In 1994, the fate of the Butt Bridge (as it is affectionately known in Augusta) was in doubt. City planners wished to get $15 million from the Federal Highway Administration to reroute 15th street, creating a new thoroughfare. Plans called for the demolishing of the Butt Bridge. The Butt Memorial Bridge Legal Defense Fund, founded by Ross Snellings, created a popular movement to save the 80-year-old bridge, producing two large-scale concerts nearby, punningly called the Butt Jam. One took place in 1994 and another in 1995. Several well-known bands of the time played the venue and the unofficial slogan, "Save Our Butt," appeared all over town.

The money generated helped stave off the destruction of the bridge for a few years, until an Act of Congress saved it. The Omnibus Consolidated and Emergency Appropriations Act, 1999 included funding language through the efforts of U.S. Sen. Paul Coverdell and U.S. Rep. Charlie Norwood to provide Augusta with nearly $9 million "for implementation of a project consisting of modifications and additions to streets, railroads, and related improvements in the vicinity of the grade crossing of the CSX railroad and 15th Street."

A 2016 $1.5 million rehabilitation of the bridge includes concrete overlay, reconfiguring the lanes to allow for bikes and sidewalks and repair and preservation of the historical decorative elements such as the eagle lanterns. On August 22, 2016, the Georgia Department of Transportation (GDOT) closed the bridge. Beginning at 9 a.m., the structure closed to the traveling public for up to 300 days to allow for full deck replacement. The bridge was to reopen prior to the 2017 Masters Tournament. Local engineers expected this Georgia Transportation Investment Act – TIA bridge rehabilitation project to have all deck work finished before the event. Following a delay due to cold weather, the bridge opened temporarily on March 31, 2017. After Masters week, it closed again for installation of lights and flashers, with project completion in April 2017.

== See also ==
- Transportation in Augusta, Georgia § Named bridges
- Passengers of RMS Titanic

== Sources ==
- Pavey, Robert. "Fate of Butt Bridge is unclear". The Augusta Chronicle. June 21, 1996.
