= Woodville (Winfield, Georgia) =

Historic house in Georgia, United States

- U.S. National Register of Historic Places
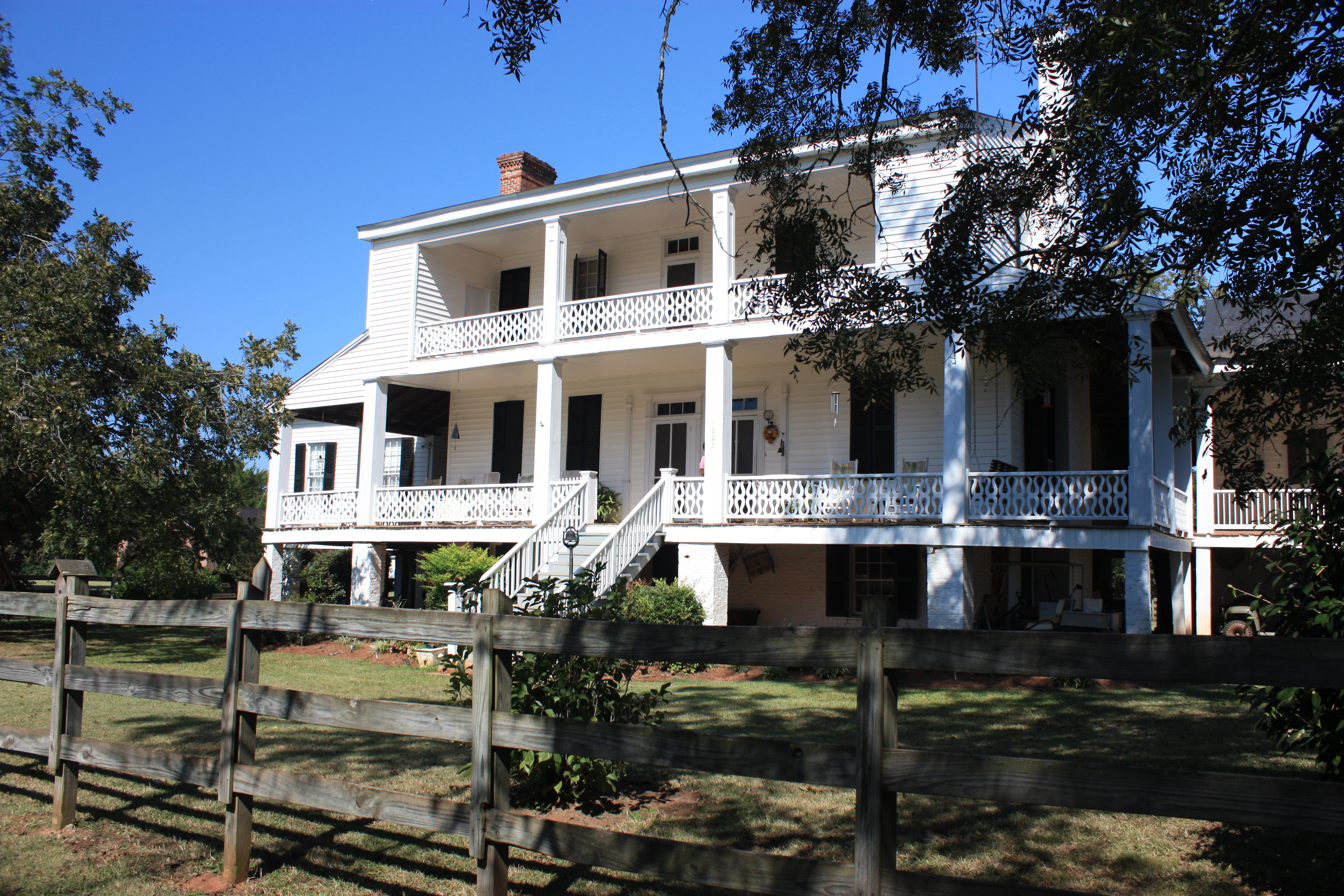
- Woodville in 2013
- Nearest city: Winfield, Georgia
- Area: 58.8 acres (23.8 ha)
- Built: 1814
- Architectural style: Plantation Plain
- NRHP reference No.: 79000714
- Added to NRHP: May 10, 1979

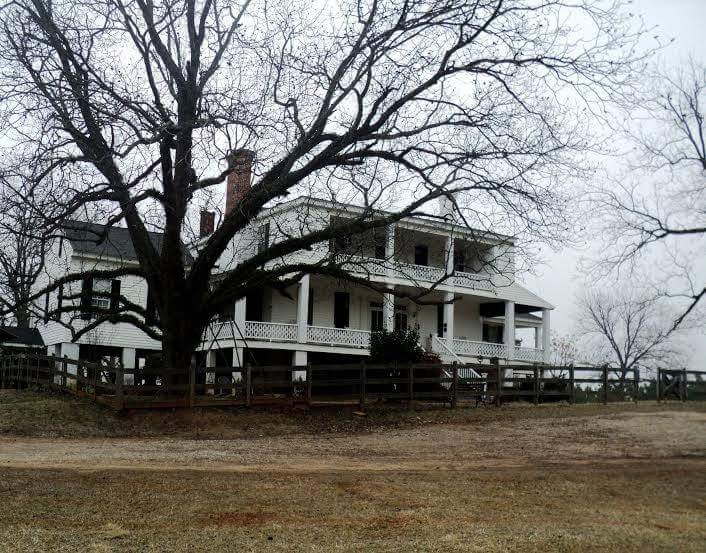

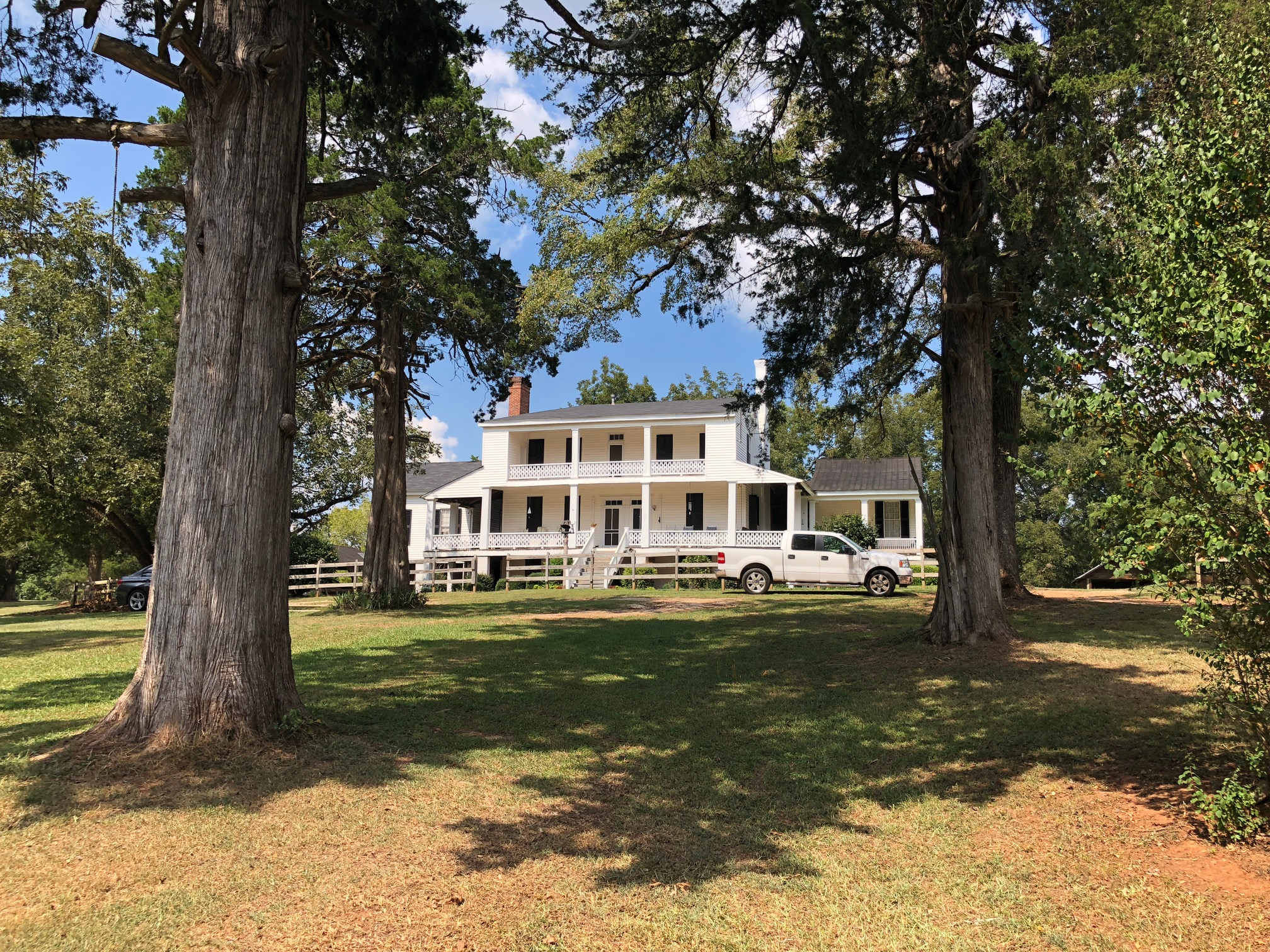

Woodville in Winfield, Georgia is a building from 1814. It was listed on the National Register of Historic Places in 1979.

It is one of a few surviving plantation-style old homes in Columbia County.
