= Snead, Georgia =

- Unincorporated community
- Location within Georgia Location within the United States
- Coordinates: 33°33′56″N 82°07′14″W
- Country: United States
- State: Georgia
- County: Columbia
- Elevation: 305 ft (93 m)
- Time zone: UTC-5 (Eastern (EST))
  - Summer (DST): UTC-4 (EDT)
- Area codes: 706 & 762
- GNIS ID: 333079

Snead (also Sneads) is an unincorporated community in Columbia County, Georgia, United States.
