= Stallings Island =

Archaeological site in Georgia, US

- U.S. National Register of Historic Places
- U.S. National Historic Landmark
- Location within Georgia Location within the United States
- Location: Columbia County, Georgia, USA
- Nearest city: Augusta, Georgia
- Coordinates: 33°33′39.4″N 82°2′47.4″W
- NRHP reference No.: 66000279

Significant dates
- Added to NRHP: October 15, 1966
- Designated NHL: January 20, 1961

Stallings Island is an archaeological site with a large shell midden, located in the Savannah River near Augusta, Georgia. The site is the namesake for the Stallings culture of the Late Archaic period and for Stallings fiber-tempered pottery, the oldest known pottery in North America. The site was declared a National Historic Landmark in 1961. Stallings Island pottery found in coastal Georgia was formerly called St. Simons pottery, but is now recognized as Stallings Island.

== Description and history ==
Stallings Island is located upriver of Augusta, in an area known as the Ninety-Nine Islands, just downriver of the mouth of Stevens Creek. The island was occupied from about 2600 B.C.E. to about 2000 B.C.E., and again from about 1800 B.C.E. to 1400 B.C.E. The site was occupied during the first period by people of the Paris Island (ca. 2500-2200 B.C.E.) and Mill Branch (ca. 2200-1800 B.C.E.) phases, pre-ceramic traditions that harvested large numbers of freshwater mussels. During the second period the site was occupied by people of the Classic Stallings culture, who used decorated pottery. The earliest, undecorated, Stallings ceramics first appeared at other sites while Stallings Island itself was unoccupied. The site represents a transitional period, in which hunter-gatherer culture was gradually replaced by more sedentary village and agriculture-based lifestyles.

The island was identified as an archaeological site in 1961, and has been the subject of several scientific excavations. It has also been subject to extensive looting, and was listed for many years as a threatened landmark. The island was acquired by the Archaeological Conservancy in 1998.

Stallings Island Middle School in Martinez, GA was named after this site.

== Pottery ==
After 2500 BCE, shards of some of the oldest pottery in the region entered the archaeologic record. Known as Stallings Fiber Tempered Pottery, the bowls were tempered with Spanish moss, which left a porous surface after firing. Fragments of the fiber tempered pottery have been found across Stallings Island. These pottery sherds are characterized by the jab and drag designs engraved on the outside of the vessels. These designs were made using a stylus that poked a design through the wet clay then dragged along the exterior until being inserted again. This process is believed to have been executed by women, and the orientation signals whether the creator was right or left handed. The design of Stalling pottery with flat bottoms came from their old ways of cooking, which consisted of using heated soapstone rocks in liquid-filled baskets to make soups/food.

=== Gender and pottery ===
Classic Stallings culture is understood to be female dominant. The prominence of pottery in the Stallings is on trend with the global pattern of women producing and utilizing pottery more than men. There is a theory surrounding the decorating of the pottery and the handedness of the decorators that suggests the skills of decorating pottery were passed down from one generation of women to the next.

== See also ==
- List of National Historic Landmarks in Georgia (U.S. state)
- National Register of Historic Places listings in Columbia County, Georgia
