= McDuffie County, Georgia =

County in Georgia, United States

- County
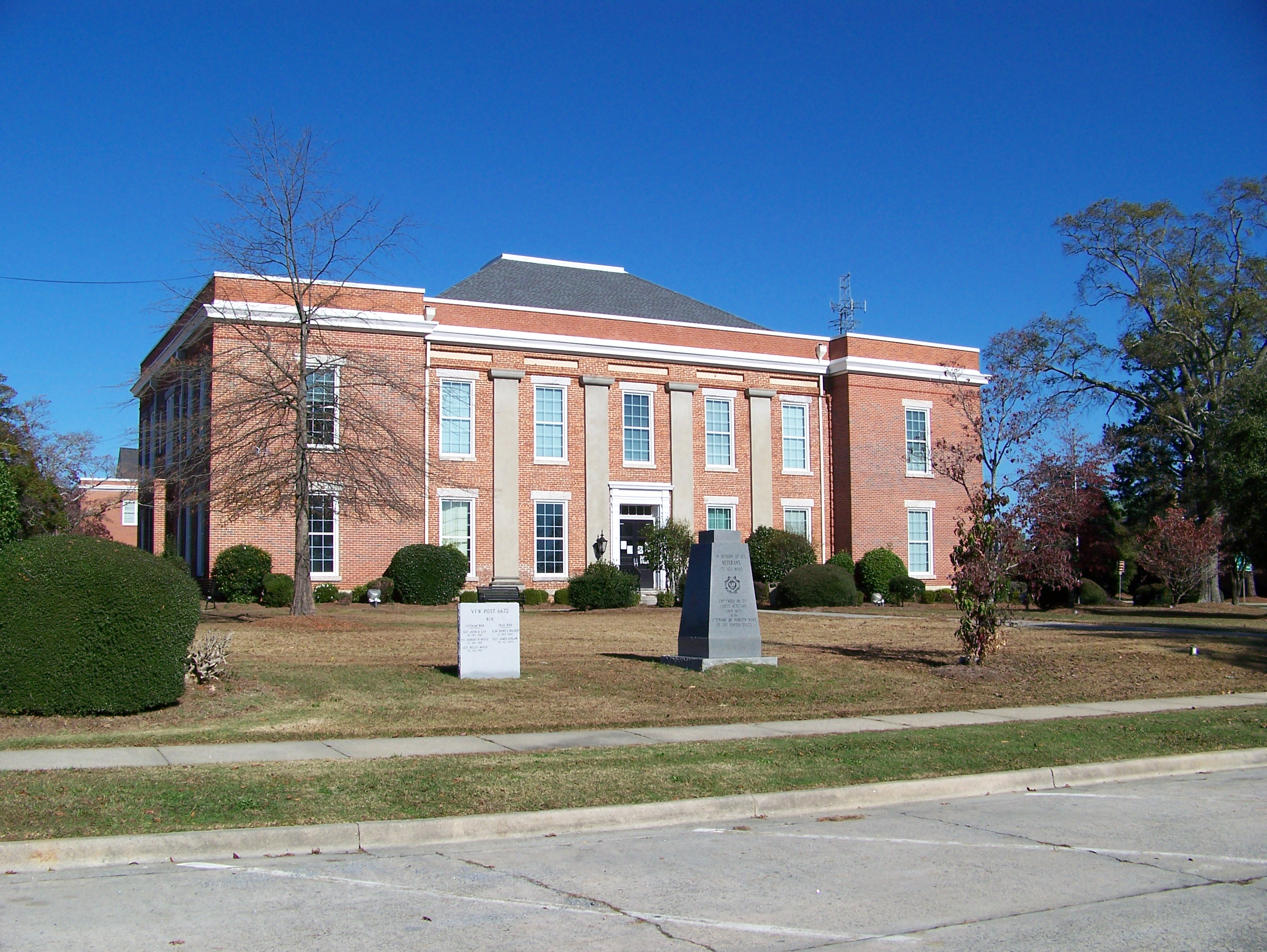
- McDuffie County Courthouse in Thomson

- Location within the U.S. state of Georgia
- Coordinates: 33°29′N 82°29′W
- Country: United States
- State: Georgia
- Founded: 1870; 156 years ago
- Named for: George McDuffie
- Seat: Thomson
- Largest city: Thomson

Area
  - Total: 266 sq mi (690 km^{2})
  - Land: 257 sq mi (670 km^{2})
  - Water: 8.9 sq mi (23 km^{2}) 3.4%

Population (2020)
  - Total: 21,632
  - Estimate (2025): 21,640 ▲
  - Density: 84/sq mi (32/km^{2})
- Time zone: UTC−5 (Eastern)
  - Summer (DST): UTC−4 (EDT)
- Congressional district: 10th
- Website: www.thomson-mcduffie.gov

McDuffie County is a county located in the U.S. state of Georgia. As of the 2020 census, the population was 21,632. The county seat is Thomson. The county was created on October 18, 1870 and named after the South Carolina governor and senator George McDuffie.

McDuffie County is part of the Augusta-Richmond County, GA-SC metropolitan statistical area.

== History ==
Most communities located in the county were founded before the county was created. Some have faded into obscurity. The Historic Wrightsborough Foundation preserves the memory of the early 12,000 acre settlement of Wrightborough, which was occupied 1768 to 1920.

Thomson was incorporated in Columbia County on February 15, 1854, and when McDuffie County was created in 1870, it was designated the county seat.

== Geography ==
According to the U.S. Census Bureau, the county has a total area of 266 square miles (690 km^{2}), of which 257 square miles (670 km^{2}) is land and 8.9 square miles (23 km^{2}) (3.4%) is water.

Most of the southern half of McDuffie County, south of Thomson, is located in the Brier Creek sub-basin of the Savannah River basin, except for a slice of the eastern portion of the county, north of Dearing and along a north–south line running through Boneville, which is located in the Middle Savannah River sub-basin of the Savannah River basin. The northern half of McDuffie County, north of Thomson, is located in the Little River sub-basin of the same Savannah River basin.

=== Major highways ===
- I-20 / SR 402 – SR 402 is the unsigned designation for I-20
- US 78 / SR 10
- US 221 / SR 47
- US 278
- SR 12
- SR 17
  - SR 17 Byp. (Thomson)
- SR 43
- SR 150
- SR 223

=== Adjacent counties ===
- Lincoln County (northeast)
- Columbia County (east)
- Richmond County (southeast)
- Jefferson County (south)
- Warren County (west)
- Wilkes County (northwest)

== Communities ==
=== City ===
- Thomson (county seat)

=== Town ===
- Dearing

=== Unincorporated communities ===
- Autney
- Boneville
- Cobbham
- Cobbham Crossroads

== Demographics ==
Historical population
Census	Pop.	Note	%±
1880	9,449		—
1890	8,789		−7.0%
1900	9,804		11.5%
1910	10,325		5.3%
1920	11,509		11.5%
1930	9,014		−21.7%
1940	10,878		20.7%
1950	11,443		5.2%
1960	12,627		10.3%
1970	15,276		21.0%
1980	18,546		21.4%
1990	20,119		8.5%
2000	21,231		5.5%
2010	21,875		3.0%
2020	21,632		−1.1%
2025 (est.)	21,640	▲	0.0%
U.S. Decennial Census; 1790-1880 1890-1910; 1920-1930 1930-1940; 1940-1950 1960-1980; 1980-2000 2010

=== Racial and ethnic composition ===
McDuffie County, Georgia – Racial and ethnic composition Note: the US Census treats Hispanic/Latino as an ethnic category. This table excludes Latinos from the racial categories and assigns them to a separate category. Hispanics/Latinos may be of any race.
Race / Ethnicity (NH = Non-Hispanic)	Pop 1980	Pop 1990	Pop 2000	Pop 2010	Pop 2020	% 1980	% 1990	% 2000	% 2010	% 2020
White alone (NH)	11,702	12,662	12,795	12,310	11,417	63.10%	62.94%	60.27%	56.27%	52.78%
Black or African American alone (NH)	6,544	7,307	7,909	8,661	8,644	35.29%	36.32%	37.25%	39.59%	39.96%
Native American or Alaska Native alone (NH)	22	38	38	56	45	0.12%	0.19%	0.18%	0.26%	0.21%
Asian alone (NH)	19	28	68	74	76	0.10%	0.14%	0.32%	0.34%	0.35%
Native Hawaiian or Pacific Islander alone (NH)	x	x	7	15	13	x	x	0.03%	0.07%	0.06%
Other race alone (NH)	7	0	3	23	37	0.04%	0.00%	0.01%	0.11%	0.17%
Mixed race or Multiracial (NH)	x	x	127	261	610	x	x	0.60%	1.19%	2.82%
Hispanic or Latino (any race)	252	84	284	475	790	1.36%	0.42%	1.34%	2.17%	3.65%
Total	18,546	20,119	21,231	21,875	21,632	100.00%	100.00%	100.00%	100.00%	100.00%

=== 2020 census ===
As of the 2020 census, the county had a population of 21,632 and 5,770 families. The median age was 42.1 years. 23.2% of residents were under the age of 18 and 19.3% of residents were 65 years of age or older.

For every 100 females there were 88.7 males, and for every 100 females age 18 and over there were 85.2 males age 18 and over. 40.6% of residents lived in urban areas, while 59.4% lived in rural areas.

McDuffie County racial composition as of 2020
Race	Num.	Perc.
White (non-Hispanic)	11,417	52.78%
Black or African American (non-Hispanic)	8,644	39.96%
Native American	45	0.21%
Asian	76	0.35%
Pacific Islander	13	0.06%
Other/Mixed	647	2.99%
Hispanic or Latino	790	3.65%

The racial makeup of the county was 53.5% White, 40.1% Black or African American, 0.2% American Indian and Alaska Native, 0.4% Asian, 0.1% Native Hawaiian and Pacific Islander, 1.6% from some other race, and 4.0% from two or more races. Hispanic or Latino residents of any race comprised 3.7% of the population.

There were 8,589 households in the county, of which 31.0% had children under the age of 18 living with them and 34.5% had a female householder with no spouse or partner present. About 27.0% of all households were made up of individuals and 12.9% had someone living alone who was 65 years of age or older.

There were 9,390 housing units, of which 8.5% were vacant. Among occupied housing units, 66.0% were owner-occupied and 34.0% were renter-occupied. The homeowner vacancy rate was 0.9% and the rental vacancy rate was 6.8%.

== Politics ==
Typical of many counties in Georgia and the Solid South, McDuffie County mainly backed candidates of the Democratic Party in presidential elections by wide margins prior to 1964. There were several exceptions to this, firstly between 1892 and 1908 when it supported Republican William McKinley and the Populist candidacies of James B. Weaver and favorite son Thomas E. Watson.

As of the 2020s, McDuffie County is a strongly Republican voting county, voting 62% for Donald Trump in 2024. For elections to the United States House of Representatives, McDuffie County is part of Georgia's 12th congressional district, currently represented by Rick Allen. For elections to the Georgia State Senate, McDuffie County is part of District 25. For elections to the Georgia House of Representatives, McDuffie County is divided between districts 125 and 128.

United States presidential election results for McDuffie County, Georgia
Year	Republican		Democratic		Third party(ies)	
Year	No.	%	No.	%	No.	%
1912	9	2.33%	271	70.21%	106	27.46%
1916	70	11.65%	466	77.54%	65	10.82%
1920	109	22.20%	382	77.80%	0	0.00%
1924	37	6.61%	267	47.68%	256	45.71%
1928	381	55.62%	304	44.38%	0	0.00%
1932	29	4.80%	568	94.04%	7	1.16%
1936	98	12.11%	705	87.14%	6	0.74%
1940	75	7.20%	959	92.12%	7	0.67%
1944	187	19.04%	795	80.96%	0	0.00%
1948	58	3.87%	182	12.13%	1,260	84.00%
1952	933	44.32%	1,172	55.68%	0	0.00%
1956	649	38.45%	1,039	61.55%	0	0.00%
1960	1,039	49.06%	1,079	50.94%	0	0.00%
1964	2,657	70.27%	1,124	29.73%	0	0.00%
1968	1,324	32.89%	992	24.65%	1,709	42.46%
1972	2,990	75.01%	996	24.99%	0	0.00%
1976	1,694	35.91%	3,024	64.09%	0	0.00%
1980	1,928	41.17%	2,667	56.95%	88	1.88%
1984	3,284	62.08%	2,006	37.92%	0	0.00%
1988	3,231	65.04%	1,704	34.30%	33	0.66%
1992	2,955	45.69%	2,640	40.82%	873	13.50%
1996	3,254	50.96%	2,725	42.68%	406	6.36%
2000	3,926	59.94%	2,580	39.39%	44	0.67%
2004	4,846	62.29%	2,899	37.26%	35	0.45%
2008	5,400	57.11%	3,989	42.19%	66	0.70%
2012	5,475	57.00%	4,044	42.10%	86	0.90%
2016	5,432	58.27%	3,699	39.68%	191	2.05%
2020	6,169	59.00%	4,168	39.86%	119	1.14%
2024	6,562	62.28%	3,937	37.36%	38	0.36%

United States Senate election results for McDuffie County, Georgia2
Year	Republican		Democratic		Third party(ies)	
Year	No.	%	No.	%	No.	%
2020	6,198	59.77%	3,968	38.26%	204	1.97%
2020	5,502	59.58%	3,733	40.42%	0	0.00%

United States Senate election results for McDuffie County, Georgia3
Year	Republican		Democratic		Third party(ies)	
Year	No.	%	No.	%	No.	%
2020	3,503	34.00%	2,387	23.17%	4,412	42.83%
2020	5,480	59.36%	3,752	40.64%	0	0.00%
2022	5,067	61.04%	3,103	37.38%	131	1.58%
2022	4,717	61.18%	2,993	38.82%	0	0.00%

Georgia Gubernatorial election results for McDuffie County
Year	Republican		Democratic		Third party(ies)	
Year	No.	%	No.	%	No.	%
2022	5,283	63.52%	2,978	35.81%	56	0.67%

== See also ==
- Central Savannah River Area
- National Register of Historic Places listings in McDuffie County, Georgia
- List of counties in Georgia
