= Augusta Preparatory Day School =

Private school in Martinez, Georgia, US

Location
- 285 Flowing Wells Road; Martinez, (Columbia County), Georgia 30907; United States
- Coordinates: 33.4992°N 82.1113°W

Information
- Type: Private
- Motto: Esse Quam Videri (To be, rather than to seem)
- Founded: 1960
- Grades: Age 2 – grade 12
- Gender: Co-educational
- Hours in school day: 7
- Colours: Royal blue and gold
- Mascot: Charlie the Cavalier
- Nickname: APDS / Augusta Prep / Prep
- Team name: Cavaliers / Lady Cavaliers
- Yearbook: Cavalier
- Head of School: Eric Hedinger
- Head of the Upper School: Ryan Scheb
- Head of the Lower School: Julianne Ingram
- Head of the Middle School: Courtney Hatcher
- Website: www.augustaprep.org

Augusta Preparatory Day School (APDS) is a non-sectarian, independent school in Augusta, Georgia, United States. It accepts students from age two through twelfth grade.

== History ==
Augusta Preparatory School began with 38 students in grades 7–12 on September 5, 1961. Augusta Country Day School was founded in 1972, and accepted students from kindergarten through fifth grade. The schools were merged to form Augusta Preparatory Day School in 1988.

Today, Augusta Prep is organized into three divisions: The Lower School enrolls students age two through grade 4, the Middle School enrolls students in grades 5 through 8, and the Upper School enrolls students in grades 9 through 12. Augusta Prep features Spanish introduced in kindergarten, chess starting in first grade, a world fair (global education) in fourth grade, fine arts introduced in Lower School, robotics in Middle and Upper School, French and Spanish in Middle School, performing arts in Middle and Upper School, athletics in Middle and Upper School, cyber team in Upper School. The Upper School offers more than 20 AP courses in engaging and challenging environment.

In the 2018–19 school year, Augusta Prep featured 85 percent of all students competing in at least one sports in grades 6–12, with 59 percent playing two sports and 28 percent playing three sports. Middle School teams won seven championships and added three-up titles. The Upper School varsity sports teams won three GISA championships (girls cross country, girls track and field, girls soccer), added four state runner-up finishes (boys swimming, girls swimming, boys cross country, boys track and field) and took home eight GISA region championships. Augusta Prep won the GISA Class AAA All-Sports Trophy for 2018–19.

Larry Mize, the 1987 Masters champion, graduated from Augusta Prep in 1976.

== Athletics ==
- Region 4-AAA All-Sports Champion: 2005, 2008, 2009, 2014, 2016, 2017, 2018, 2019
- GISA Class AAA All-Sports Champion: 2019
- 1971–1972 Men's Soccer GISA Champions
- 1976–1977 Men's Soccer GISA Champions
- 1993–1994 Men's Tennis Class AA GISA Champions
- 1994–1995 Men's Tennis Class AAA GISA Champions
- 1994–1995 Women's Tennis Class AAA GISA Champions
- 1995–1996 Women's Tennis Class AAA GISA Champions
- 1996–1997 Men's Tennis Class AA GISA Champions
- 1996–1997 Women's Tennis Class AA GISA Champions
- 1997–1998 Men's Tennis Class AA GISA Champions
- 1997–1998 Women's Tennis Class AA GISA Champions
- 1998–1999 Men's Tennis Class AAA GISA Champions
- 1998–1999 Women's Tennis Class AAA GISA Champions
- 1999–2000 Golf Class AAA GISA Champions
- 1999–2000 Men's Tennis Class AAA GISA Champions
- 2000–2001 Men's Tennis Class AAA GISA Champions
- 2001–2002 Men's Cross Country Class AAA GISA Champions
- 2002–2003 Golf Class AAA GISA Champions
- 2002–2003 Women's Cross Country Class AAA GISA Champions
- 2003–2004 Men's Tennis Class AAA GISA Champions
- 2004–2005 Men's Tennis Class AAA GISA Champions
- 2004–2005 Women's Cross Country Class AAA GISA Champions
- 2004–2005 Women's Tennis Class AAA GISA Champions
- 2005–2006 Golf Class AAA GISA Champions
- 2005–2006 Men's Tennis Class AA GISA Champions
- 2005–2006 Men's Tennis Class AAA GISA Champions
- 2006–2007 Volleyball Class AAA GISA Champions
- 2007–2008 Volleyball Class AAA GISA Champions
- 2007–2008 Women's Tennis Class AAA GISA Champions
- 2008–2009 Men's Swimming Class AAA GISA Champions
- 2008–2009 Women's Cross Country Class AAA GISA Champions
- 2009–2010 Men's Swimming GISA Champions
- 2010–2011 Women's Cross Country GISA Champions
- 2011–2012 Men's Swimming GISA Champions
- 2013–2014 Men's Football GISA Champions
- 2013–2014 Men's Golf GISA Champions
- 2013–2014 Women's Soccer GISA Champions
- 2014–2015 Women's Soccer GISA Champions
- 2014–2015 Women's Tennis GISA Champions
- 2015–2016 Women's Soccer GISA Champions
- 2016–2017 Men's Swimming GISA Champions
- 2016–2017 Women's Soccer GISA Champions
- 2017–2018 Men's Cross Country GISA Champions
- 2017–2018 Women's Cross Country GISA Champions
- 2018–2019 Women's Cross Country GISA Champions
- 2018–2019 Women's Track and Field GISA Champions
- 2018–2019 Women's Soccer GISA Champions
- 2019-2020 Men's Cross Country GISA Champions
- 2019-2020 Women's Cross Country GISA Champions
