= Cobbham, Georgia =

Unincorporated community in Georgia, U.S.

Coordinates: 33°34′07″N 82°25′57″W

Cobbham is an unincorporated community along the McDuffie County, and Columbia County line in the U.S. state of Georgia.

== History ==
The community was named after local landholder and Revolutionary War veteran Thomas Cobb.
