= Augusta Christian Schools =

Christian school in Augusta, Georgia, United States

Location
- 313 Baston Rd; Martinez, Columbia County, Georgia; United States
- Coordinates: 33°31′30″N 82°04′35″W

Information
- Motto: "Building Kingdom leaders to serve Jesus Christ as Lord."
- Religious affiliation: Christian
- Founded: 1958
- Founder: Leila Havird, Jennings Murphy and Charles B. Whitney
- School district: C.S.R.A. Central Savannah River Area
- Principal: Berish Strother, Paige McLemore, Michelle Wiley
- Head of school: Dr. Brian Simmons, Interim
- Staff: 70
- Grades: K–3 to 12
- Gender: Coeducational
- Enrollment: 600
- Language: English, Spanish, and Latin are offered.
- Campus size: 2 campus, 26 acres
- Colors: Red, white, and black
- Athletics: Basketball, baseball, cheerleading, cross country, football, golf, scholastic shooting, soccer, softball, swimming, tennis, track and field, volleyball, wrestling
- Athletics conference: SCISA AAAA
- Mascot: Lion
- Team name: Lions
- Rival: Cardinal Newman, Hammond, Heathwood
- Accreditation: ASCI, SACS/Cognia, SCISA
- Publication: Lions Roar
- Key products: AP and Honors Courses, Health Sciences, CNA Certification, Fine Arts, Athletics, STEM
- Website: Augusta Christian Schools

The Augusta Christian Schools (ACS), is a Christian school located in Martinez, Georgia, in the Augusta, Georgia area in the United States. It includes kindergarten, elementary, and middle and high school.

== Accreditation ==
Augusta Christian Schools is accredited by the Association of Christian Schools International (ACSI) and the Southern Association of Colleges and Schools (SACS).

== History ==
The school was founded in 1958 as a small class. They met for years in South Augusta and moved to the Baston Road campus in 1973. In 2004, the school purchase property on Fury's Ferry Road, which is now used for kindergarten classrooms.

In 2016, the school campus was converted to a fiber optic band campus in order to offer a student curriculum on laptops and tablets. The wi-fi campus affords 90% of the school's curriculum to be digital.

== Athletics ==
- 1995-1996, 1998-1999, GISA AAA Baseball State Champions, 2005–2007 Baseball Class AAA SCISA Champions
- 2023, 2024 Baseball Class AAAA SCISA Champions
- 1995-1996, 1998-1999, GISA AAA Men's Basketball State Champions, 2021-2022 Men's Basketball Class AAA SCISA Champions
- 2022-2023 Men's Basketball Class AAAA SCISA Champions
- 2005-2010 FCC Georgia Regional Cheerleading Champions
- 2007, 2009-2011 FCC National Cheerleading Champions
- 2000-2001, 2003-2004 Women's Cross Country Class AAA SCISA Champions
- 2005, 2012 Men's Football Class AAA SCISA Champions
- 1995-1996, 2001-2002, 2002–2003 Men's Tennis Class AAA SCISA Champions
- 2003-2004 Women's Track Class AAA SCISA Champions
