= Winfield, Georgia =

Community in the state of Georgia

- Unincorporated community
- Location within Georgia Location within the United States
- Coordinates: 33°36′22″N 82°23′48″W
- Country: United States
- State: Georgia
- County: Columbia
- Elevation: 497 ft (151 m)
- Time zone: UTC-5 (Eastern (EST))
  - Summer (DST): UTC-4 (EDT)
- Area codes: 706 & 762
- GNIS ID: 326596

Winfield is an unincorporated community in Columbia County, in the U.S. state of Georgia.

== History ==
A post office called Winfield was established in 1851, and remained in operation until 1918. It is unclear why the name "Winfield" was applied to this community. A variant name is "Sharon Church".

Near Winfield stands Woodville, an antebellum plantation mansion which was listed on the National Register of Historic Places in 1979.
