= Dearing, Georgia =

- Town
- Location in McDuffie County and the state of Georgia
- Coordinates: 33°24′48″N 82°23′5″W
- Country: United States
- State: Georgia
- County: McDuffie

Area
  - Total: 0.82 sq mi (2.13 km^{2})
  - Land: 0.81 sq mi (2.11 km^{2})
  - Water: 0.0077 sq mi (0.02 km^{2})
- Elevation: 469 ft (143 m)

Population (2020)
  - Total: 529
  - Density: 649.1/sq mi (250.61/km^{2})
- Time zone: UTC-5 (Eastern (EST))
  - Summer (DST): UTC-4 (EDT)
- ZIP code: 30808
- Area code: 706
- FIPS code: 13-22024
- GNIS feature ID: 0355471

Dearing is a town in McDuffie County, Georgia, United States. The population was 529 at the 2020 census. It is part of the Augusta metropolitan area.

== History ==
An early variant name was "Lombardy". A post office called Lombardy was established in 1823, and the name was changed to Dearing in 1893. The Georgia General Assembly incorporated the place in 1910 as the "Town of Dearing". The present name is after William Dearing, a railroad official.

== Geography ==
Dearing is located in southeastern McDuffie County at 33°24′48″N 82°23′5″W (33.413425, -82.384781). U.S. Routes 78 and 278 run together through the town, leading northwest 8 miles (13 km) to Thomson, the county seat, and east 4 miles (6 km) to Harlem. Augusta is 24 miles (39 km) east of Dearing.

According to the United States Census Bureau, the town has a total area of 0.8 square miles (2.1 km^{2}), of which 0.01 square miles (0.03 km^{2}), or 1.09%, are water. The town is drained to the south by tributaries of Headstall Creek, which flows south to Brier Creek, a tributary of the Savannah River.

== Demographics ==
Historical population
Census	Pop.	Note	%±
1920	256		—
1930	246		−3.9%
1940	273		11.0%
1950	325		19.0%
1960	403		24.0%
1970	555		37.7%
1980	539		−2.9%
1990	547		1.5%
2000	441		−19.4%
2010	549		24.5%
2020	529		−3.6%
U.S. Decennial Census

As of the census of 2000, there were 441 people, 178 households, and 126 families residing in the town. By 2020, its population was 529.

== See also ==
- Central Savannah River Area
