= Kiokee Baptist Church =

Historic church in Georgia, United States

- U.S. National Register of Historic Places
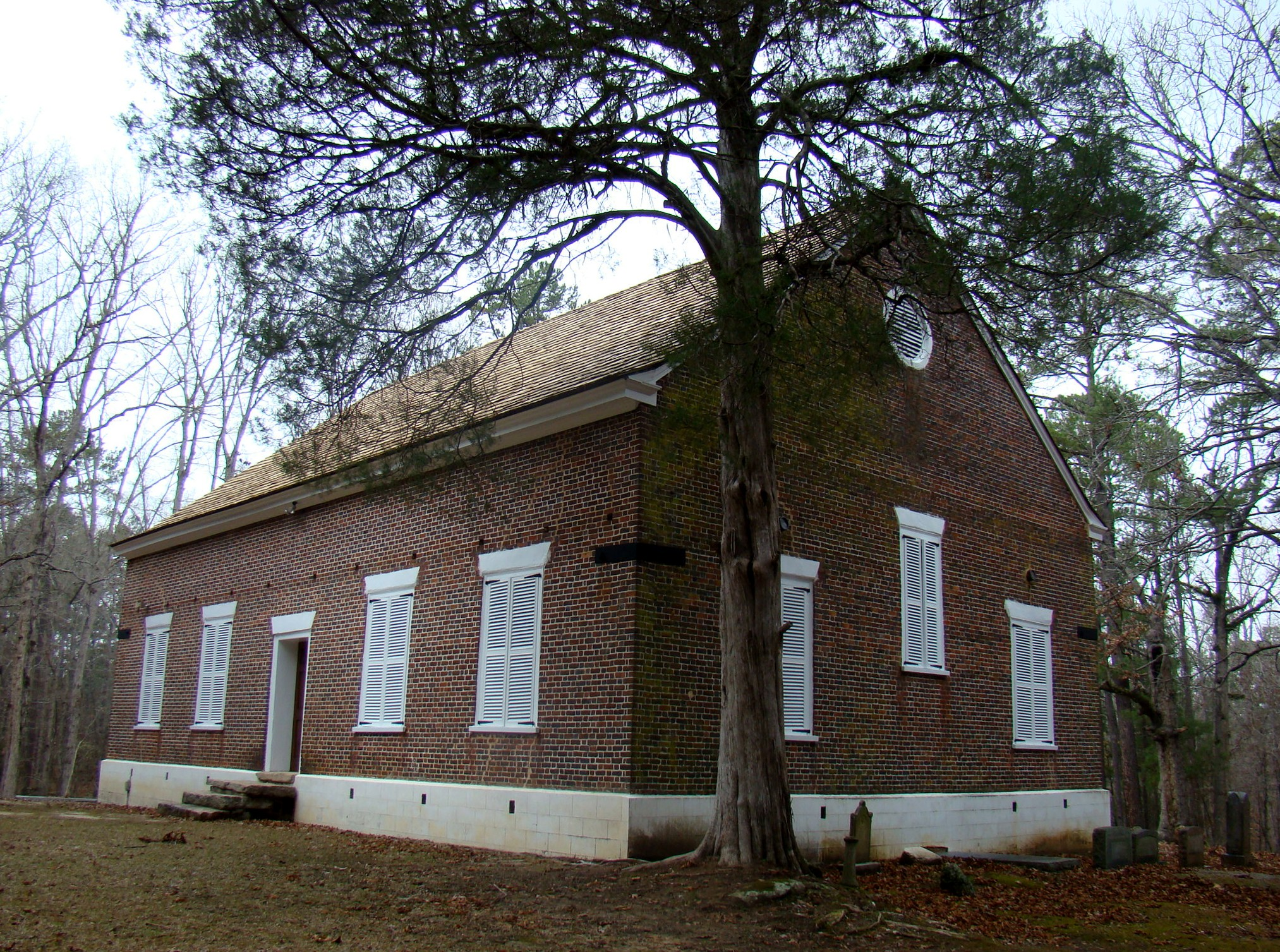

- Location within Georgia Location within the United States
- Location: Kiokee Rd., Appling, Georgia
- Coordinates: 33°34′41″N 82°17′32″W
- Area: 2.5 acres (1.0 ha)
- Built: 1808
- Architect: Boyd Danielly; John Hezikiah
- NRHP reference No.: 78000976
- Added to NRHP: December 08, 1978

The Kiokee Baptist Church in Appling, Georgia is the oldest continuing Southern Baptist congregation in the state.

== History ==
Kiokee Baptist Church was founded in 1772 by the Reverend Daniel Marshall and is generally regarded as the oldest continuing Baptist congregation in Georgia.

The location of the congregation's first church building is unknown. Around 1792, the congregation erected a structure known as "Marshall's Meetinghouse". In 1808, the Old Kiokee building was constructed on the present site.

A chapel was built in Appling around 1828 and operated as a mission of the church until it was destroyed by a tornado in 1875. According to local tradition, the tornado may explain the turnbuckles visible in the Old Kiokee building, which are said to have been installed in an effort to realign the structure.

In 1907, a former Methodist church known as "St. Mary's" was purchased and relocated to Appling, where it was used until 1937. A sixth meeting house was completed in 1937 and currently serves as a chapel. The church's seventh and current meeting house was completed in 1995.

The church continues to hold baptisms in Kiokee Creek behind the Old Kiokee building.

Its founder, Daniel Marshall, was the first great Baptist leader in Georgia. Kiokee Baptist Church was listed on the National Register of Historic Places in 1978.
