= History of Augusta University =

Augusta University was officially formed January 8, 2013, from the consolidation of Augusta State University and Georgia Health Sciences University in Augusta, Georgia by order of the University System of Georgia Board of Regents.

== History of GHSU ==
Georgia Health Sciences University was chartered in 1828, upon the request of Milton Antony and Joseph Adams Eve, by the state of Georgia as the Medical Academy of Georgia to offer a single course of lectures leading to a bachelor's degree. In December 1829, the Georgia General Assembly changed the name to the Medical Institute of Georgia, and again to the Medical College of Georgia in December 1833. City Hospital was the first location of the school on Greene Street, until a move over to The Old Medical College building in 1835 served as the primary home for facilities until 1913.

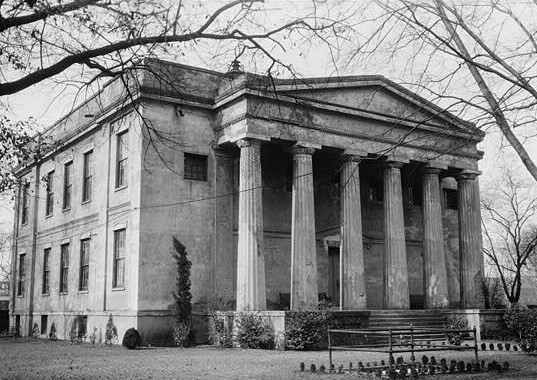
Old Medical College in Augusta, Georgia in 1934, where the Medical College of Georgia's first classes were held

The college began with three programs: Anatomy and surgery, institutes and practices of medicine and diseases of women and children, and materia medica, chemistry, and pharmacy.

The College of Nursing offered its first classes in the 1940s, and Master's and doctoral programs were first offered in the 1960s. The Colleges of Allied Health Sciences, Dental Medicine and Graduate Studies were added in the next decade, comprising the five schools that made up the University until the 2013 merger.

The most recent facilities expansions include the Cancer Research Building opened in 2003; the Health Sciences Building in 2006; and a new dental school building in 2011.

In 2011, the University System of Georgia Board of Regents officially changed the name from the Medical College of Georgia to Georgia Health Sciences University, to reflect the university having "more than just a medical school" as President Ricardo Azziz stated to the Augusta Chronicle. The MCG name became that of the medical school within GHSU, alongside the other four colleges.

=== Notable accomplishments ===
Several medical breakthroughs occurred on its campus:

- In 1850, the college received national attention when Dr. Paul Eve, a professor of surgery, performed the first hysterectomy in the United States, removing a uterus due to a malignant tumor. Subsequently, he was elected chair of the American Medical Association's committee on surgery.
- Dr. William F. Hamilton invented the Hamilton manometer in 1945, which reflected light off a mirror onto photosensitive paper and helped pave the way for Electrocardigram technological advancement. His work also led to Drs. Andre Cournand and Dickenson Richards invented the Cournan catheter, which won the 1956 Nobel Prize in Physiology or Medicine. In the acceptance speech, Cournand honored Dr. Hamilton by saying in reference to the manometer, "…it is well to recall that most of our early knowledge of pressure pulses was obtained by using this."
- Two other medical breakthroughs came from Dr. Virgil Sydenstricker, chairmen of the Department of Medicine from 1922 to 1957. The first, in 1923, was the first documented case of sickle cell disease, with a full autopsy report. The second was a new method of blood transfusion with storied, citrated blood – the precursor to modern blood banks that replaced directly transfusing blood from a donor to a patient.
- Once more, a teaching professor put MCG on the map, as Dr. Paul McDonough performed the first prenatal in Georgia in 1965. But that wasn't all – in fact, he discovered a gene protein 23 years later in the adrenal gland that produces too much testosterone, helping a legal mandate for all 50 states be passed to test for congenital adrenal hyperplasia, a disorder in newborns.

== History of ASU ==
Augusta State University traces its roots to 1783, when the Academy of Richmond County was founded as a high school. It opened in 1785 and offered collegiate-level classes from its earliest days, and its classes were overseen by the Georgia General Assembly. Graduates were accepted into colleges as sophomores or juniors. Operation of the academy was overseen by a board of trustees until 1909, when control was passed to the Augusta Board of Education. The college-level classes continued to be overseen by a committee of the state legislature. As enrollment increased, land for a new building was purchased. In 1925, prior to completion of the new building, the Junior College of Augusta was established. In 1957, the junior college separated from the academy and moved to its present location on Walton Way to become Augusta College, now referenced as the Summerville campus.

In 1958, the college became a part of the University System of Georgia and its name was formally changed to Augusta College. It remained a two-year college until 1963, when it attained four-year status. A second campus was added on Wrightsboro Road, which still houses athletics, kinesiology and health science, a golf house, and 18-hole golf course. Additional buildings, such as Boykin Wright and Reese Library, were added in the 1980s.

In 1996, Augusta College was renamed Augusta State University, and campus continued to expand with the addition of University Hall and a new Science Hall. The name remained until the 2013 consolidation with GHSU.

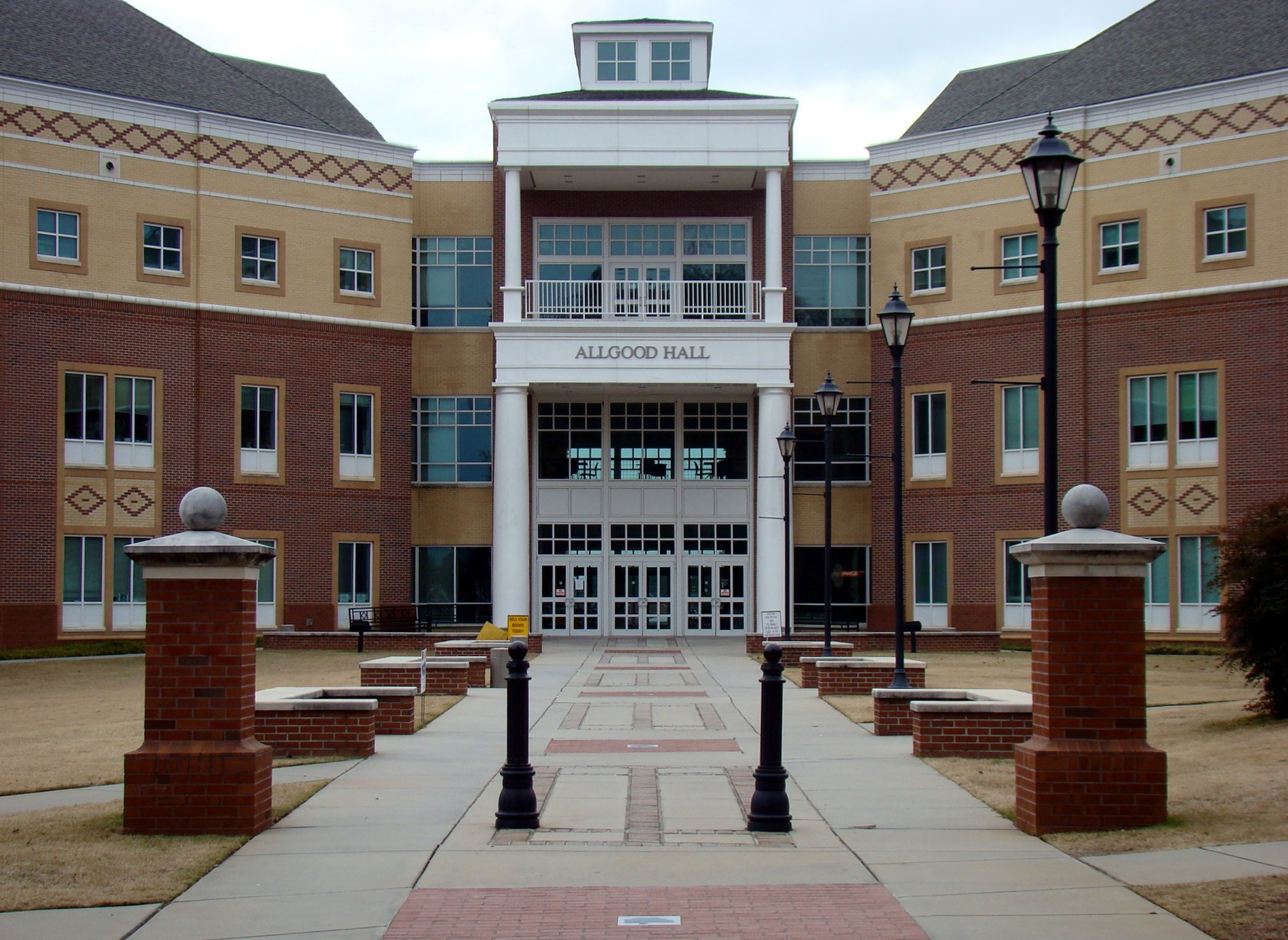
Allgood Hall was part of the major campus expansions on the Augusta State campus.

Augusta State was organized into four undergraduate colleges: Katherine Reese Pamplin College of Arts, Humanities, and Social Sciences, James M. Hull College of Business, the College of Education, and the College of Science and Mathematics. Students could earn associate, bachelor, master, and specialist degrees in over 100 programs of study as well as a paralegal certificate and a cooperative doctorate. There was an Honors Program, as well as a Cooperative Education program in which students alternated between classroom enrollment and real-life work experience in their field of study. Students also had opportunities for internships and study abroad programs.

In May 2009 the university hosted the 25th annual National Science Olympiad tournament.
