= Ricardo Azziz =

President of Georgia Regents University (born 1958)

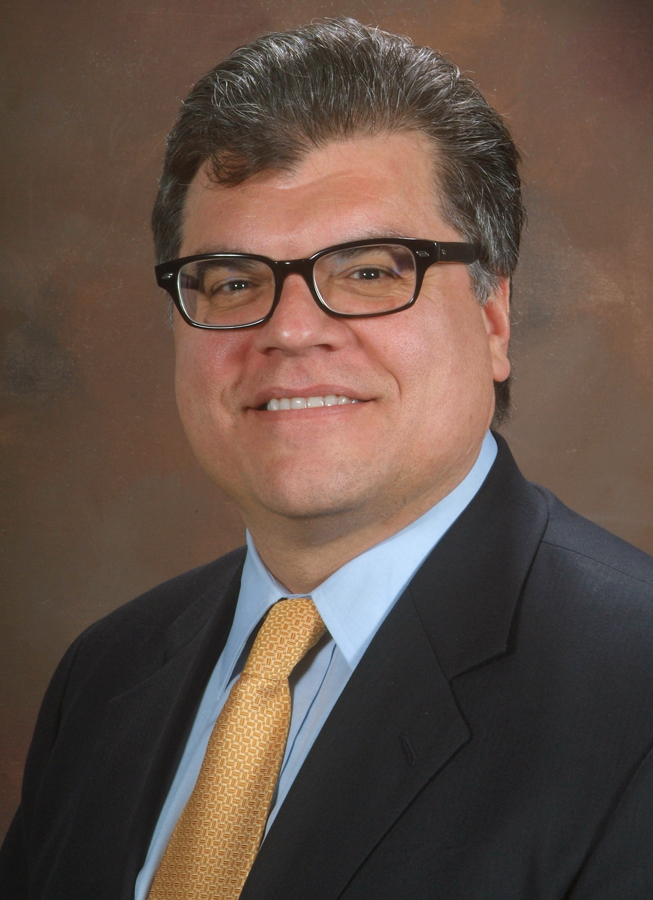

Principal, SPH Consulting Group
- Incumbent
- Assumed office 2022

Chief Executive Officer, American Society for Reproductive Medicine
- In office 2016 – 2019

Chief Officer of Academic Health and Hospital Affairs, State University of New York (SUNY) System Administration
- In office 2012–2015

1st President of Georgia Regents University
- In office 2012–2015
- Succeeded by: Brooks Keel

8th (and last) President of Georgia Health Sciences University President of Georgia Health Sciences University
- In office 2010–2012
- Preceded by: Daniel W. Rahn

Personal details
- Born: March 5, 1958 (age 68) Montevideo, Uruguay
- Education: University of Puerto Rico; Penn State University; Georgetown University, University of Alabama at Birmingham
- Profession: Executive administration, education, bio-medical research, clinical medicine
- Website: ricardoazziz.com

Academic work
- Discipline: Higher Education, Academic healthcare
- Institutions: University of Alabama at Birmingham; Cedars-Sinai Medical Center; University of California, Los Angeles; Georgia Regents University; State University of New York

Ricardo Azziz is a Uruguayan-American higher education and biomedical executive administrator and researcher who serves as Principal of SPH Consulting Group. He also serves as Executive Director of the non-profit Foundation for Research and Education Excellence and Director of the Center for Higher Education Mergers and Acquisitions at the Foundation.

In addition to his medical degree, Azziz obtained master's degrees in Public Health and Business Administration. He served as president of Georgia Regents University (now Augusta University) in the U.S. state of Georgia and was chief executive officer of its health system, Georgia Regents Medical Center (now Augusta University Medical Center). He had faculty and department chair positions at Cedars-Sinai Medical Center, David Geffen School of Medicine at UCLA and University of Alabama at Birmingham, and was in health and hospital administration at the State University of New York.

As of 2019, Azziz has authored more than 500 publications, with a research focus in biomedical sciences, specifically androgen excess disorders in women. He is a recognized expert in female reproductive disorders, particularly androgen excess and polyendocrine metabolic ovarian syndrome (PMOS).

== Early life and education ==
Azziz was born in Montevideo, Uruguay; his father was a nuclear physicist and his mother was an anthropologist, both Ph.D. holders. His family moved to the U.S. when he was two and his early years were spent mostly in Pittsburgh, with frequent "nomadic" excursions with his parents from Uruguay to Puerto Rico to Costa Rica, and back to Puerto Rico to begin his collegiate studies.

Azziz earned a Bachelor of Science degree from the University of Puerto Rico in 1977, in biology and pre-medicine, graduating magna cum laude. He graduated in 1981 from the Pennsylvania State University College of Medicine in Hershey. Following an internship and residency in obstetrics and gynecology (ob/gyn) at Georgetown University Hospital in Washington, D.C., Azziz completed a fellowship in reproductive endocrinology and infertility at Johns Hopkins Hospital in Baltimore, Maryland. Between 1985 and 1987, he was an ob/gyn instructor at Johns Hopkins.

Azziz earned his M.P.H. in 1995 from the University of Alabama at Birmingham (UAB), and his M.B.A. from there in 2000; he graduated with honors and was inducted into the Beta Gamma Sigma Honor Society of the Association to Advance Collegiate Schools of Business.

== Career ==
=== Alabama and Los Angeles: 1987–2010 ===
From 1987 to 2002, Azziz taught at UAB where he served in several positions in the Department of Obstetrics and Gynecology.

Azziz was Chair of the Department of Obstetrics and Gynecology at Cedars-Sinai Medical Center (CSMC) in Los Angeles, named the "Helping Hand of Los Angeles Chair". He served as director of the Center for Androgen Related Disorders at CSMC. At the David Geffen School of Medicine at UCLA, he was a professor and vice chairman of the Department of Obstetrics and Gynecology.

=== Georgia: 2010–2015 ===
In March 2010, the Board of Regents of the University System of Georgia (USG) announced that Azziz would be named the eighth president of what was then called the Medical College of Georgia (MCG), USG's health sciences university. Stating that Azziz "stood out [in an] impressive pool of candidates," the Regents envisioned USG "expand[ing] its capacity to educate healthcare professionals to meet state needs". Then-governor of Georgia Sonny Perdue attended a July 10 signing ceremony as Azziz formally assumed the presidency at MCG and also became the CEO and chairman of a new entity, MCG Health Systems, Inc., which brought the university hospitals and clinics under the authority of Azziz via a joint operating agreement.

Azziz drew public scrutiny in August 2010 when he proposed changing the name of MCG to something with "university" in its name, in order to acknowledge that MCG included schools other than medicine. Azziz said that the medical school (Medical College of Georgia) would retain its name, but that the university would have a new name, encompassing all of the colleges (for example, dentistry and nursing). At a cost estimated at nearly US$3 million for the switchover, the new name would be Georgia Health Sciences University (GHSU).

Azziz said in 2011 that Georgia lacked enough medical residency slots, and that Georgia struggled to graduate enough nurses; as such, more residency positions were needed in-state to retain graduates. In 2011, the MCG-affiliated hospitals also changed their names and a new partnership was launched to make more physicians available, help students complete rotations in different specialties, and develop better synergies among partners.

Azziz chaired the Consolidation Working Group to combine Augusta State University and GHSU to become Georgia Regents University (GRU, now Augusta University), which the Regents called "a bold move to create a new university that builds on the strength of two institutions with distinct missions". The USG Regents identified goals for consolidating institutions to "ensure the System has a 21st century structure with the right network of institutions offering the proper range of degrees". In 2012, former Regent William S. Morris III, chairman of Morris Communications, (Note: Morris Communications published The Augusta Chronicle and The Florida Times-Union) resigned from the GHSU board over the proposed name change, disappointed with Azziz that the word Augusta was not in the name. Characterizing the new name as an affront to the city of Augusta, Morris said of Azziz, "The naming convention you have advocated, and now gained endorsement from the Georgia regents, lacks sensitivity to the enormous community good will that has been cultivated over the years." On January 8, 2013, the Regents approved the consolidation of GHSU and Augusta State University to create Georgia Regents University, and Azziz was selected founding president of the new university.

The joining of a primarily graduate and professional level research university with selective admissions standards and a primarily undergraduate level university was described by regents Chair Philip Wilheit as "one of the most complex consolidations undertaken in [Georgia] ... if not in the country". Azziz delivered a report to the Regents in September 2014, describing progress towards meeting consolidation goals, including increases retention, standards, enrollment, funding and giving, with a 10% decline in administrative costs. Walter Jones reported that "The trickiest 'soft issue' was picking a name because many in the community wanted the city included while Azziz and others feared that would label it a community college instead of a world-class research institute. Azziz "praised the regents [for] shielding him from the public outrage" and "acknowledged that the GRU consolidation process should have been more transparent, especially in explaining the reasons for the merger." A Time magazine report featured the consolidation, with Jon Marcus describing it as the "kind of corporate-style consolidation that is becoming increasingly common not only for public institutions, but also for nonprofit, private ones that can pool their resources for marketing, fundraising, purchasing and information technology in a time of falling budgets". Azziz stated the consolidation had resulted quickly in administrative cost cuts, and that "it is much more costly to maintain all of the moving parts at a small college than at a larger university".

In January 2015, Azziz announced he would step down from his positions effective June 30, 2015. Hank Huckaby, a chancellor, said the decision was voluntary, and Georgia Representative Barbara Sims said Azziz had completed his mission, describing him as a "visionary" adding that "most of the things he initiated will continue". Walter Jones reported that there was community displeasure over the naming controversy. Huckaby said that although the university name change had been a "bitter source of debate", the name would not change. Attending his last meeting in May 2015, Azziz received a standing ovation from the board, and remarked that taking risks does not come easily in public institutions, but must be done. In September of the same year, the Regents voted unanimously to change the name to Augusta University.

During Azziz's 2014 application for the presidency at University of Nevada, Las Vegas, questions were raised about the Augusta name change and other controversies including the proposed cost of a new carport for the president's home (which Azziz said was needed for staging events, but the project was cancelled), and his use of a university bus to transport guests at his niece's wedding (a cost of about $400, which was reimbursed).

=== Since 2015 ===
After leaving Augusta, Azziz joined the Pullias Center for Higher Education in the Rossier School of Education at the University of Southern California as a visiting scholar.

He served as Chief Officer of Academic Health and Hospital Affairs for the State University of New York (SUNY) until 2019.

Azziz served as the chief executive officer of the American Society for Reproductive Medicine (ASRM) beginning in January 2020 to June 2021.

== Memberships and other professional affiliations ==
Azziz is a fellow of the American College of Surgeons and the American College of Obstetricians and Gynecologists. He was a president of the Pennsylvania State College of Medicine Alumni Society.

Azziz helped initiate the creation of an international nonprofit organization, the Androgen Excess and Polycystic Ovary Syndrome Society, and in 2002 was named the founding executive director. As of 2019, he served as the senior executive director.

In 2005 Azziz was appointed by then Governor Arnold Schwarzenegger to the Independent Citizens Oversight Committee, the regulatory body for the California Institute of Regenerative Medicine. He was appointed in 2017 by New York Governor Andrew Cuomo to lead the SUNY Hispanic Leadership Institute, and has advocated for furthering diversity and inclusion in higher education.

== Research focus ==
Azziz is a recognized expert in female reproductive disorders, particularly androgen excess and polyendocrine metabolic ovarian syndrome (PMOS). The NIH has funded his research on androgen excess disorders since 1988. He has generated more than 500 publications, reviews and chapters, and authored or edited numerous textbooks.

Azziz has also published in the area of change management in academe, specifically mergers and consolidations.

=== Books ===
- Azziz, Ricardo (2006). McGraw-Hill Specialty Review: Obstetrics & Gynecology: Cases, Questions, and Answers (1st ed.). McGraw-Hill Specialty Board Review. ISBN 978-0071458207.
- Azziz, Ricardo; Davis, Jane (2007). Obstetrics and Gynecology (McGraw-Hill Specialty Board Review). McGraw-Hill Medical. ISBN 978-0071100052.
- Azziz, Ricardo (2007). The Polycystic Ovary Syndrome: Current Concepts on Pathogenesis and Clinical Care. Publisher: Springer-Verlag.
- Azziz, Ricardo (2013). White, Jenna (ed.). THIS IS NOT A PEAR IN CLEVELAND-Ricardo Azziz 1983-2013 Works on Paper Hardcover. Rusty Fence Productions. ISBN 978-0989982719.
- Azziz, Ricardo (2015). Shared Legacies: A Pictorial History of Georgia Regents University. The Donning Company Publishers. ISBN 978-1578649501.
- Azziz, Ricardo; Hentschke, Gilbert C.; Jacobs, Lloyd A.; Jacobs, Bonita C. (2019). Strategic Mergers in Higher Education. Johns Hopkins University Press. ISBN 978-1421432601.

== Personal life ==
Azziz married Cindy Beckham and has three children. He is a visual artist, primarily creating pen-and-ink drawings in the surrealist style of the early 20th century, with a published retrospective. His work was exhibited at the Art Department at Georgia Regents University.

== Honors and awards ==
- Cheston M. Berlin Award, Penn State Univ. College of Medicine Alumni Society, 1992
- Beta Gamma Sigma Honor Society of AACSB Accredited Business Programs, 2000
- Society for Gynecologic Investigation President's Achievement Award for Clinical Research, 2000
- Recipient of the Endowed "Helping Hand of Los Angeles Chair in Obstetrics & Gynecology" Chair, 2002–2010
- 100 Most Influential Georgians – Georgia Trend magazine, 2011–2015
- Elected member of the Association of American Physicians, 2014–present
- Alumni Fellow Award of the Pennsylvania State University (PSU) Alumni Association, 2014
- PCOS Challenge Leadership and Advocacy Award, PCOS Challenge, 2014
- Establishment of endowed "Ricardo Azziz PCOS Challenge Advocacy Leadership Award", PCOS Challenge, Inc.
- Establishment of endowed "Ricardo Azziz Presidential Scholarship", GRU Board of Visitors
- Establishment of endowed "Ricardo Azziz Distinguished Researcher Award", Androgen Excess & PCOS Society, Inc.
- June 2, 2015 proclaimed "Ricardo Azziz Day", City of Augusta
- Birmingham Business Journal Who's Who in Nonprofits, 2020
- UAB Excellence in Business Top 25 award, 2021
- PCOS Challenge 'International Researcher of Influence Award', 2022
