= Lee Ann Liska =

American hospital administrator

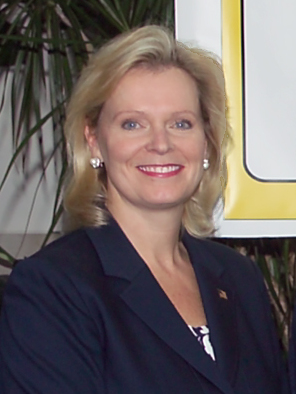
- Liska in 2008
- Born: Ohio, U.S.

Academic background
- Education: Cleveland State University

Academic work
- Discipline: Health systems
- Institutions: University of Cincinnati; Augusta University; Vanderbilt University

Lee Ann Liska is an American hospital administrator specializing in health system optimization. She has served as the president of Vanderbilt University Medical Center since 2023. She was the chief executive officer of the Augusta University Medical Center from 2016 to 2019.

== Life ==
Liska is from Ohio. She completed a bachelor's degree in communication and an executive M.B.A. from Cleveland State University.

Liska was the vice president of medical operations for the MetroHealth System. In 2002, she joined the Cleveland Clinic Florida as its chief operating officer of hospitals in Weston and Naples. From 2004 to 2008, she was the vice president and executive operations director of the Health Alliance. Liska was the chief operating officer of University Hospital, Cincinnati for four years before working for two years as its chief executive officer. In 2007, she was elected a fellow of the American College of Healthcare Executives. From 2010 to 2013, Liska was the chief operating officer of the Southwest Ohio region for Mercy Health. She was the president of the University of Cincinnati Medical Center and chief executive officer and UC Health senior vice president from 2013 to 2015. She worked as a senior executive for MetroHealth and Cleveland Clinic. She specializes in health system optimization. She was an adjunct professor at Xavier University and a guest lecturer at the University of Cincinnati.

On August 22, 2016, Liska became the executive vice president for health affairs and chief executive officer at Augusta University Medical Center. She succeeded interim chief executive Peter F. Buckley. In December 2018, Liska was elected an at-large trustee of the Georgia Hospital Association. She was an adjunct professor at the Augusta University college of allied health sciences. She left Augusta in June 2019 and was succeeded by interim executive Brooks A. Keel. In October 2020, Liska became the chief operating officer of Vanderbilt University Adult Hospital, succeeding Scott McCarver. She served as the interim president of Vanderbilt University Hospital for six months before formally assuming the role in December 2023. She succeeded Shon Dwyer.
