= Edward J. Cashin =

American historian (1927–2007)

- Born: July 22, 1927; United States of America
- Died: September 8, 2007 (aged 80)
- Other name: Brother Edward Lawrence
- Education: Boys Catholic High School; Bachelors Degree from Marist College; Master's Degree in History from Fordham University; Ph.D. in History from Fordham University
- Occupation: Historian
- Employer: Augusta State University
- Spouse: Mary Ann Klug (1969-?)
- Children: 2
- Parent(s): Margaret O'Leary; Edward Cashin
- Honours: Governor's Award in the Humanities

Edward J. Cashin (July 22, 1927– September 8, 2007) was an American historian. He was Professor emeritus of History and Director of the Center for the Study of Georgia History at Augusta State University in Augusta, Georgia. Cashin was the author of many books and numerous articles on the history of Georgia, especially Augusta, and the Southern frontier in the 18th century.

He was a native son of Augusta, Georgia, where he graduated from Boys Catholic High School in 1945. He was a graduate of Marist College in Poughkeepsie, New York, in 1952. He received his M.A. from Fordham University in New York. He received his Ph.D. in American History from Fordham in 1962. His doctoral dissertation was entitled "Thomas E. Watson and the Catholic Laymen's Association of Georgia." He was appointed Academic Vice-president of Marist College in 1963, while continuing teaching in the History Department there.

Cashin returned to his hometown as associate history professor at Augusta College (now Augusta University) in 1969. He was named a full professor in 1972. He became chairman of the department of history in 1975. He retired from Augusta State University in 1996 as professor emeritus. He then founded and became director of the Center for the Study of Georgia History at Augusta State University.

Cashin was known for his research, knowledge and historical writings. Through his biographies of people such as Scottish trader Lachlan McGillivray, "King's Ranger" Thomas Brown, and numerous other important figures, Cashin provided narratives which preserved knowledge of the central roles they had in Georgia's history.

Cashin died on September 8, 2007, in a hospital in Atlanta, Georgia. He had collapsed two days earlier while researching his next book.

== Works ==
- 1975 Augusta and the American Revolution: Events in the Georgia Back Country 1773-1783 (with Heard Robertson)
- 1976 A History of Augusta College (with Helen Callahan)
- 1978 An Informal History of Augusta
- 1980 The Story of Augusta
- 1985 The Quest: A History Of Public Education In Richmond County, Georgia
- 1986 Colonial Augusta: "Key of the Indian Countrey" (editor)
- 1987 The Story of Sacred Heart
- 1989 The King's Ranger: Thomas Brown and the American Revolution on the Southern Frontier
- 1992 Lachlan McGillivray, Indian Trader: The Shaping of the Southern Colonial Frontier
- 1994 Governor Henry Ellis and the Transformation of British North America
- 1994 A Wilderness Still the Cradle of Nature: Frontier Georgia
- 1995 Old Springfield: Race and Religion in Augusta, Georgia
- 1995 Setting Out to Begin a New World: Colonial Georgia, A Documentary History
- 2000 William Bartram and the American Revolution on the Southern Frontier
- 2001 General Sherman's Girl Friend and Other Stories About Augusta (illustrated by Jeb Cashin)
- 2001 Paternalism in a Southern City: Race, Religion, and Gender in Augusta, Georgia (editor, with Glenn T. Eskew)
- 2001 Beloved Bethesda: A History of George Whitefield's Home for Boys
- 2002 The Brightest Arm of the Savannah - The Augusta Canal 1845 - 2000
- 2003 From Balloons to Blue Angels: The story of Aviation in Augusta, Georgia
- 2009 Guardians of the Valley: Chickasaws in Colonial South Carolina and Georgia (posthumous publication)

== Awards ==
- 1987 Governor's Award in the Humanities from the Georgia Humanities Council
- 1997 Hugh McCall Award from the Georgia Association of Historians
- 1992 Malcolm and Muriel Barrow Bell Award of the Georgia Historical Society, for Lachlan McGillivray
- 1990 Fraunces Tavern Book Award of the American Revolution Round Table, for The King's Ranger
