= No-Hee Park =

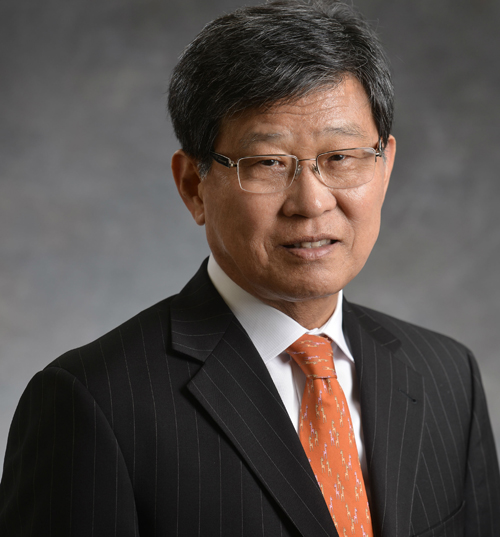
- No-Hee Park in 2013
- Born: January 1944 (age 82); South Korea
- Education: Seoul National University (D.D.S., 1968; M.S.D.); Medical College of Georgia (Augusta University) (Ph.D., 1978); Harvard University (D.M.D., 1982)
- Occupations: Educator, Scientist, Academic Administrator
- Employer: University of California, Los Angeles

No-Hee Park (born 1944) is a Korean-American scientist, dental educator, and academic administrator. He is dean and professor emeritus at the UCLA School of Dentistry and professor emeritus at the David Geffen School of Medicine at UCLA. Park served as dean of the UCLA School of Dentistry from 1998 to 2016, the longest tenure in that school's history, and is the first Korean-American to be appointed dean of a major U.S. university. A member of the UCLA Jonsson Comprehensive Cancer Center, his research has focused on oral and head-and-neck cancer, human papillomavirus (HPV), cellular aging, and molecular carcinogenesis, resulting in more than 220 peer-reviewed publications.

== Education and early career ==
Park received a D.D.S. from Seoul National University in 1968, followed by a Certificate in Periodontics (M.S.D.) from the same university. He served as a dental officer in the Republic of Korea Army for three years, retiring as a captain.

Park emigrated to the United States in 1974 and earned a Ph.D. in Pharmacology from the Medical College of Georgia (now Augusta University) in 1978. From 1978 to 1982, he held research appointments at Harvard University's Eye Research Institute while simultaneously serving as an instructor in the Department of Ophthalmology at Harvard Medical School. He received a Doctor of Dental Medicine (D.M.D.) from Harvard University in 1982 and joined its faculty as an assistant professor in the Department of Oral Biology and Pathophysiology.

== UCLA career ==
In 1984, Park joined the UCLA School of Dentistry as an associate professor and was promoted to full professor in 1985. He served as director of the UCLA Dental Research Institute and associate dean for research before his appointment as dean in 1998. In 2004, he received a joint appointment as professor in the Department of Medicine (Division of Hematology and Oncology) at the David Geffen School of Medicine at UCLA, and in 2006 was named a Distinguished Professor at both schools.

Park maintained an active clinical practice in periodontics for more than twenty years through the UCLA Faculty Group Dental Practice.

Park retired from his full-time faculty position on January 1, 2026, after more than four decades at UCLA. He continues to contribute to grant-funded research through the UCLA Shapiro Family Laboratory of Viral Oncology and Aging Research.

== Deanship (1998–2016) ==
Park was appointed as dean of the School of Dentistry in 1998. He served as dean until June 30, 2016, an eighteen-year tenure that made him the longest-serving dean in the school's history and the second-longest among all UCLA schools and colleges. He was also the first Korean-American to be appointed dean of a major U.S. university.

Under his leadership, annual extramural research funding grew, and the school established eleven endowed chairs, including the Dr. No-Hee Park Endowed Chair in Dentistry.

== Research ==
Park's early research (1975–1983), conducted at the Medical College of Georgia and Harvard, focused on the development of anti-herpes simplex virus (HSV) drugs. Later, Park shifted focus to the molecular mechanisms of human oral and oropharyngeal cancer. His laboratory's contributions include documenting the combined carcinogenic effects of tobacco-derived chemical carcinogens and herpes simplex virus, establishing the role of high-risk human papillomaviruses (HPVs) in the immortalization of normal human oral keratinocytes and in activating telomerase, and developing in vitro human oral epithelial cell lines representing the stepwise progression from normal to malignant states. His laboratory has also studied the relationship between chronic oral inflammation and systemic diseases, including periodontitis, atherosclerosis, and Alzheimer's disease.

Park has trained more than 100 postdoctoral fellows, graduate students, and visiting scholars, many of whom hold faculty, department chair, or dean positions at institutions in the United States, South Korea, Japan, China, and Europe.

== Awards and honors ==
| Year | Award | Granting organization |
|---|---|---|
| 2006 | Distinguished Professor of Dentistry and Medicine | University of California, Los Angeles |
| 2007 | Proud Alumnus of the Year (university-wide) | Seoul National University |
| 2010 | Gies Award for Outstanding Achievement — Dental Educator | ADEAGies Foundation |
| 2012 | Fellow | American Association for the Advancement of Science |
| 2017 | Person of Distinguished Service to Science and Technology (Korean National Laureate) | Republic of Korea |
| 2022 | Irwin D. Mandel Distinguished Mentoring Award | American Association for Dental, Oral, and Craniofacial Research |

Park was elected a Fellow of the AAAS in 2012, recognized for contributions to oral cancer research and dental education, particularly in oral carcinogenesis, viral infection, and cellular aging.

== Personal life ==
Park married Yubai Park in 1969. They have a daughter, son-in-law, and granddaughter, who reside in Atlanta, Georgia. In May 2025, Park published an autobiography, Turning Points: Moments That Shaped Me, in both English and Korean, tracing his upbringing in post-Korean War South Korea and his scientific and academic career.

== Bibliography ==
=== Books ===
- Park, No-Hee. The Oncogenesis of Head and Neck Cancer. Begell House, New York–Connecticut, 2018.
- Park, No-Hee, ed. Novel Therapies in Head and Neck Cancer: Beyond the Horizon. Elsevier Inc. Academic Press, 2020.
- Park, No-Hee. Turning Points: Moments That Shaped Me. Self-published, 2025.

=== Selected peer-reviewed publications ===
- Park N-H, et al. "Combined oral carcinogenicity of HPV-16 and benzo(a)pyrene: An in vitro multistep carcinogenesis model." Oncogene 10 (1995): 2145–2153. PMID 7784058.
- Yu B, Chang J, Liu Y, Li J, Kevork K, Al-Hezaimi K, Graves DT, Park N-H, Wang C-Y. "Wnt4 signaling prevents skeletal aging and inflammation by inhibiting nuclear factor-κB." Nature Medicine 20, no. 9 (2014): 1009–1017. PMID 25083757.
- Kim RH, Kang MK, Kim T, Yang P, Bae S, Williams DW, Phung S, Shin KH, Hong C, Park NH. "Regulation of p53 during senescence in normal human keratinocytes." Aging Cell 14, no. 5 (2015): 838–846. PMID 26135736.
- Perez RE, Shen H, Duan L, Kim RH, Kim T, Park N-H, Maki CG. "Modeling the etiology of p53-mutated cancer cells." Journal of Biological Chemistry 291, no. 19 (2016): 10131–10147. PMID 27022024.
- Chen W, Kim S, Kim SY, Beheshtian C, Kim N, Shin KH, Kim RH, Kim S, Park NH. "GV1001, hTERT Peptide Fragment, Prevents Doxorubicin-Induced Endothelial-to-Mesenchymal Transition in Human Endothelial Cells and Atherosclerosis in Mice." Cells 14, no. 2 (2025): 98. PMID 39851526.
