= Brooks A. Keel =

American university president

2nd President of Augusta University
- In office July 20, 2015 – June 30, 2024
- Preceded by: Ricardo Azziz
- Succeeded by: Russell T. Keen

Personal details
- Born: Augusta, Georgia, United States
- Spouse: Dr. Tammie Schalue
- Education: Augusta College; Medical College of Georgia
- Website: www.augusta.edu/president//
- Scientific career
- Fields: Endocrinology
- Workplaces: University of Kansas School of Medicine; Florida State University; Louisiana State University; Georgia Southern University

Dr. Brooks A. Keel, now retired, was the President of Augusta University and Chief Executive Officer of AU Health System from July 20, 2015 to June 30, 2024.

== Background ==
The University System of Georgia Board of Regents announced the selection of Brooks A. Keel, Ph.D. as President of Augusta University and CEO of AU Health on July 8, 2015, and he began serving on July 20.

Prior to his selection to lead Augusta University, he served as the 12th president of Georgia Southern University beginning January 4, 2010.

Keel was born, raised, and educated in Augusta, Georgia, and graduated with his Bachelor's from Augusta State University and his PhD from the Medical College of Georgia when they were separate institutes. Before serving as president at Georgia Southern, Keel served as the vice chancellor of research and economic development at Louisiana State University in Baton Rouge, Louisiana.
