= Pamplin College of Arts, Humanities, and Social Sciences =

Katherine Reese Pamplin College of Arts, Humanities, and Social Sciences
- Type: Public
- Dean: Dr. Wesley L. Meares, PhD (interim)
- Location: Augusta, Georgia, USA
- Website: http://www.augusta.edu/pamplin/

The Katherine Reese Pamplin College of Arts, Humanities, and Social Sciences is one of ten colleges and schools at Augusta University, and is the largest with seven departments. It offers a variety of undergraduate degrees, an MA in Intelligence and Security Studies and also an NASPAA-certified Master of Public Administration. Classes are primarily located in Allgood Hall on the Summerville campus, with music classes primarily in the music building and art classes in Washington Hall.

Accreditations include the Council on Social Work Education, National Association of Schools of Art and Design, National Association of Schools of Public Affairs and Administration, and the National Association of Schools of Music.

== History ==
When it first formed, Augusta College offered degrees in science and another in the arts, providing the foundation for what eventually became the College of Arts and Sciences within the university.

The college is now named after Robert B. Pamplin, Sr.'s wife Katherine, who graduated from Augusta College. Originally, it was called the Katherine Reese Pamplin College of Arts and Sciences, but split in the summer of 2012 into two parts so the Deans could have a narrower focus. The College of Science and Mathematics sprung from the division, with the Pamplin College of Arts, Humanities, and Social Sciences stemming from everything else.

On October 26, 2026, it was announced to students, staff, and faculty of the University that Dr. Kim Davies had stepped down from the Dean position, and had returned to her faculty role. The temporary interim successor was named to be Dr. Andrew Goss, former chair of the History, Anthropology, and Philosophy department in the same email, with the replacement of Wesley L. Meares, PhD for the interim dean role of the College being named on November 10th, 2026. It is widely speculated that Dr. Kim Davies was asked to step down by the University's administration.

== Departments ==
Pamplin has seven departments:

- Art and Design
- Communication
- English & World Languages
- History, Anthropology, and Philosophy
- Music
- Psychological Sciences
- Social Sciences

== Degrees ==
Each department offers a range of degrees, primarily at the undergraduate level:

=== Art ===
- B.F.A., General Art
- B.F.A., Drawing/Painting
- B.F.A., Sculpture/Ceramics
- B.F.A., Printmaking/Photography
- B.F.A., Graphic Design
- B.F.A., Animation
- B.A., General Art
- B.A., Pre-Medical Illustration

=== Communication ===
Each degree is a Bachelor of Arts in Communication, from one of five tracks:

- Communication Studies
- Theatre
- Journalism
- Public Relations
- Television and Cinema

=== English and Foreign Languages ===
- B.A., English, English Literature
- B.A., English, English/Secondary Education
- B.A., English, Creative Writing
- B.A., English, Professional Writing and Rhetoric
- B.A., Foreign Languages, French
- B.A., Foreign Languages, French Education
- B.A., Foreign Languages, Spanish
- B.A., Foreign Languages, Spanish Education

=== History, Anthropology, and Philosophy ===
- B.A., Anthropology
- B.A., History
- B.A., History with Secondary Teacher Certification

=== Music ===
- B.A., Music
- B.M., Music Education
- B.M., Instrumental Performance
- B.M., Piano Performance
- B.M., Vocal Performance

=== Political Science ===
- B.A., Political Science
  - Concentrations include International Studies, Security Studies, Legal Studies, Public Administration, and Secondary School Teaching
- M.P.A., with optional track for Criminal Justice or a Certificate in Nonprofit Leadership
- M.A.I.S.S., Master of Arts in Intelligence and Security Studies with optional Certificates in Intelligence Studies, Epidemiological Intelligence, and Social Influence

=== Sociology ===
- B.S., Sociology
- B.S., Criminal Justice
- B.S., Social Work
