= Simona Hunyadi Murph =

Romanian-American scientist

Simona Hunyadi Murph is a Romanian-American scientist, engineer, inventor at Savannah River National Laboratory (Aiken, South Carolina), and she is an adjunct professor in the physics and astronomy department at the University of Georgia (in Athens, Georgia, United States).

== Biography ==
=== Early life ===
As a young child, Simona was inspired to study chemistry both by her mother's elaborate Romanian cooking and by scientist Marie Curie's life.

=== Education ===
She received her Bachelor of Science in Chemistry & Physics in 1995 from Babeș-Bolyai University, in Cluj-Napoca, Romania. Directly after, she went on for her Master of Science in Chemistry/Electrochemistry at the same university, graduating in 1996.

In 2007, Murph obtained her Doctor of Philosophy degree in Chemistry/Nanotechnology at the University of South Carolina (in Columbia, SC). In 2012, she went further to earn her Education Specialist degree in Educational Leadership & Administration at Augusta University (in Augusta, GA).

=== Career ===
Simona Murph has worked in a number of capacities at universities. She has also inspired others at Savannah River National Laboratories where she has worked as a senior scientist, fellow scientist, environmental manager, outreach program coordinator, and program manager. One project she founded and manages is the Group for Innovation & Advancements in Nano-Technology Sciences (GIANTS). "This program includes undergraduate and graduate students, as well as postdoctoral researchers from the University of South Carolina, University of Georgia, Clemson University, Georgia Institute of Technology, and Augusta University."

=== Awards and honors ===
Murph has won numerous awards including:

- United States Department of Energy - “Inspirational Woman in STEM”
- Savannah River National Laboratory : NNSA Programs - Women at the Forefront of their Field of Expertise Recognition, 2011
- Savannah River National Laboratory - Key Contributor Award: for Nanotechnology Advances in the Field, 2015
- Savannah River National Laboratory - Exceptional Leadership Award, 2016
- SRNL Director's Award for Exceptional Scientific and Engineering Achievement, 2017
- SRNL Laboratory Directed Research and Development Program - Most Valuable Project Award, 2019

=== Societies ===
- Minerals, Metals & Materials Society - Board of Directors
- Frontiers in Nanoenergy, Technologies, and Materials - Editorial Board

== Publications ==
Simona has over 160 publications. Her most cited work has been cited over 3200 times. Below is a sampling of her most cited works, each one has been cited more than 400 times:

- Anisotropic metal nanoparticles: synthesis, assembly, and optical applications - CJ Murphy, TK Sau, AM Gole, CJ Orendorff, J Gao, L Gou, SE Hunyadi, ...

The Journal of Physical Chemistry B, (2005)

- Chemical sensing and imaging with metallic nanorods - CJ Murphy, AM Gole, SE Hunyadi, JW Stone, PN Sisco, A Alkilany, ...

Chemical Communications, (2008)

- One-dimensional colloidal gold and silver nanostructures - CJ Murphy, AM Gole, SE Hunyadi, CJ Orendorff

Inorganic chemistry, (2006)

== Patents ==
Murph has been awarded multiple patents including a few in the year 2020:

- Methods and materials for determination of distribution coefficients for separation materials, US10598599B2
- Radiation Detectors Employing Contemporaneous Detection and Decontamination, US20200082954A1
- Controlled Release of Hydrogen from Composite Nanoparticles, US20180319658A1
