= Southern Medical Journal =

- Discipline: Medicine
- Language: English
- Edited by: G. Richard Holt

Publication details
- Former name: Journal of the Southern Medical Association
- History: 1836–1839; 1908–present
- Publisher: Lippincott Williams & Wilkins for the Southern Medical Association (United States)
- Frequency: Monthly
- Impact factor: 0.924 (2010)

Standard abbreviations
- ISO 4: South. Med. J.

Indexing
- CODEN: SMJOAV
- ISSN: 0038-4348 (print); 1541-8243 (web)
- LCCN: 09010004
- OCLC no.: 01766196

Links
- Journal homepage; Online access; Online archive

The Southern Medical Journal (SMJ) is a peer-reviewed medical journal, established by Milton Antony. It is the official publication of the Southern Medical Association. The journal is indexed and abstracted in Index Medicus, Current Contents, Science Citation Index, and EMBASE. DOIs of the form doi:10.7196/samj.5744 no longer work, but the articles are still available.
