= Robert Benjamin Greenblatt =

Canadian physician and medical researcher

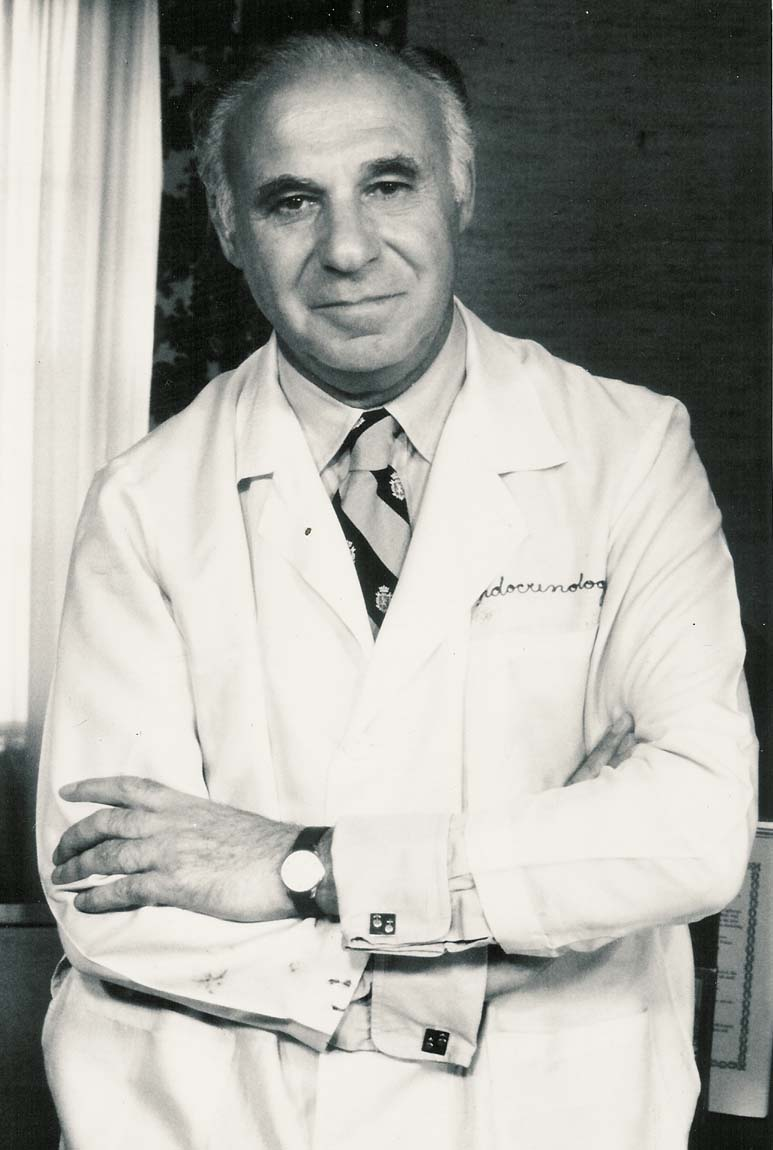
- Robert B. Greenblatt
- Born: 1906; Montreal, Quebec, Canada
- Died: 27 September 1987 (aged 80–81); United States
- Education: McGill University
- Known for: Development of oral contraceptive pill; clomiphene citrate
- Awards: Crawford W. Long Memorial Medal; Legion of Honor
- Scientific career
- Fields: Endocrinology, Obstetrics and gynecology
- Workplaces: Medical College of Georgia

Robert Benjamin Greenblatt (1906–1987) was a Canadian physician and medical researcher specializing in endocrinology who spent almost all of his career at the Medical College of Georgia. At MCG he helped establish endocrinology as an independent discipline and served from 1946 to 1972 as professor and chair of what is described as the first academic department of endocrinology in the United States. He became especially known for research on hormonal therapy, including the sequential oral contraceptive pill and the induction of ovulation with clomiphene citrate.

== Biography ==
Greenblatt was born in Montreal, Quebec, on October 12, 1906. He attended McGill University in Montreal, where he received his Bachelor of Arts degree in 1928 and his Doctor of Medicine and Master of Surgery degrees in 1932. In 1935, after completing his internship, he joined MCG as a research fellow in pathology and resident in obstetrics and gynecology. In 1937, he was appointed assistant professor of pathology and gynecology, and two years later, he was named professor of experimental medicine. Greenblatt went on to pioneer endocrinology as an independent discipline.

In his early years at MCG Greenblatt worked with Edgar Pund on the pathology and therapy of granuloma inguinale, a widely endemic venereal disease. In 1943 he volunteered for military service and served as a Commander and Senior Medical Officer in the U.S. Coast Guard. His first assignment was to quell a venereal disease epidemic spreading among sailors in Savannah, Ga. He helped develop mass production of penicillin for battlefield use; commanded a triage unit on the Okinawa beachhead for wounded Marines; and was among the first scientists to inspect the medical effects of the atomic bomb in Nagasaki. Commander Greenblatt was honorably discharged in 1945.

He returned to MCG after World War II and from 1946 to 1974 he served as professor and chairman of the institution's Department of Endocrinology, the first academic department of its kind in the country.

Greenblatt started his clinical work in reproductive endocrinology, the branch of medicine concerned with infertility in women, when the field was in its infancy. His major advances in the field include, in 1950, showing the effectiveness of estrogens in managing menopause symptoms and developing, in 1966, a monthly oral contraceptive pill, an accomplishment for which MCG received national attention. His group's discovery in 1961 that clomiphene citrate could induce ovulation was a breakthrough in reproductive biology, and clomiphene citrate is today the first choice in treating ovulatory disorders. He also showed that the drug Danazol was useful in the management of endometriosis and fibrocystic breast disease.

Greenblatt's published works include hundreds of full-length scientific articles. He also wrote or edited more than 20 books for a lay audience. His 1968 book Search the Scriptures: Modern Medicine and Biblical Personages went through 26 printings. Greenblatt also updated "Advances in Endocrinology" in the Encyclopædia Britannica Yearbook for 18 years. In 1987, he authored Sex and Circumstance: Humanity in History, which contained 44 vignettes detailing the sexual nature of people ranging from U.S. President John F. Kennedy to Pyotr Ilyich Tchaikovsky.

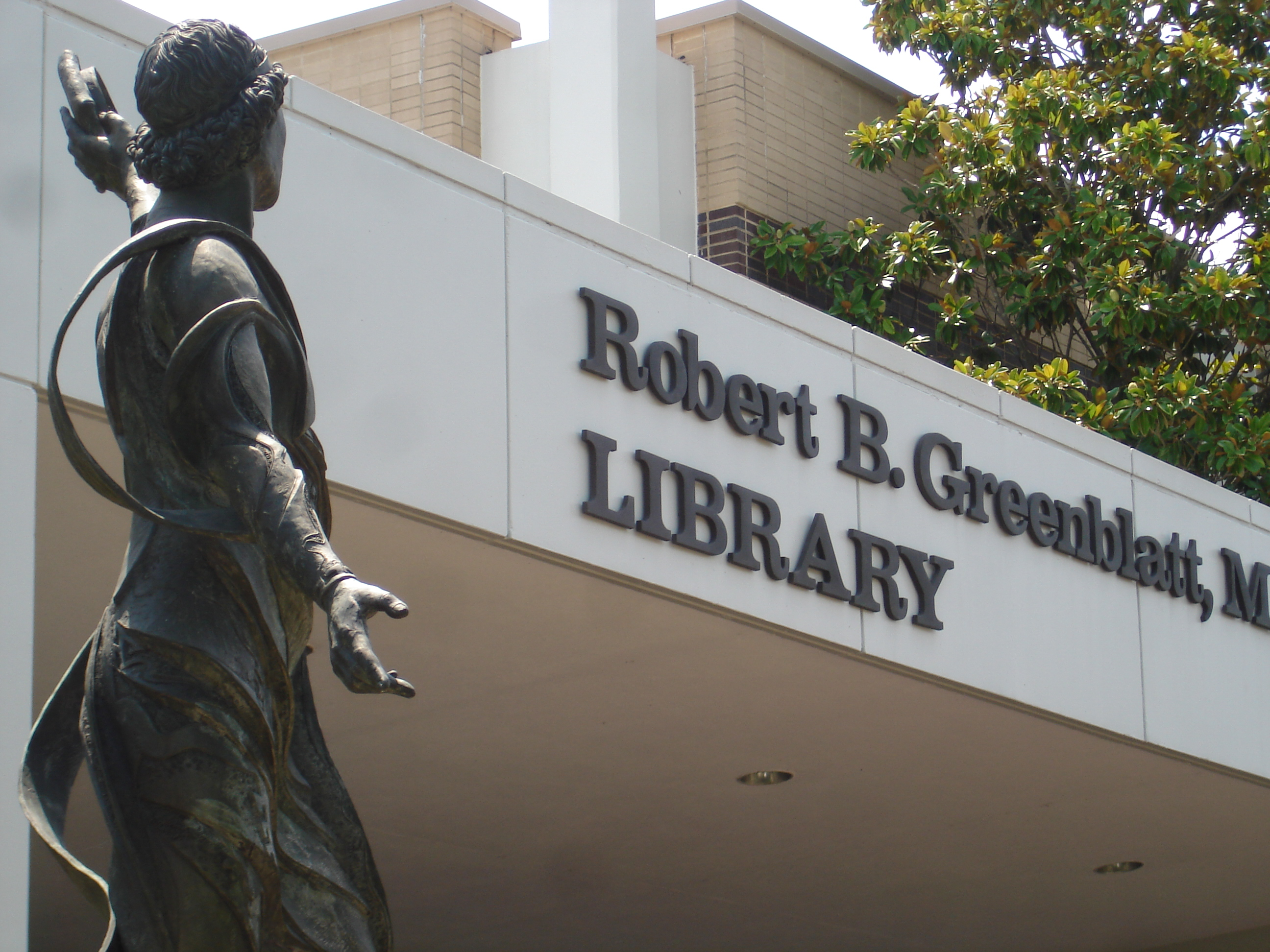
Robert B. Greenblatt Library

== Honors ==
Greenblatt was awarded the Crawford W. Long Memorial Medal for his work on menometrorrhagia in 1941. He also received France's Legion of Honor, Chevalier de la Légion d'honneur, in 1973, and the Sociedad de Ginecologia y Obstetricia de Monterrey Gold Medal award of Mexico in 1974. In March 1987, he was elected honorary fellow in the Royal College of Obstetricians and Gynecologists in Great Britain.

Greenblatt's influence extended beyond his research through institutional and educational contributions. In 1975, the Medical College of Georgia established the ''Robert B. Greenblatt Lectureship'' to bring distinguished scientists and clinicians to Augusta. MCG's library was renamed in his honor in 1988 at Augusta University's Medical College of Georgia. At McGill University, the Robert B. Greenblatt Prize was endowed in 1987 and is awarded to a student with the highest standing in the Reproduction and Sexuality course. Greenblatt died on September 27, 1987.
