= Michael T. Dugan =

- Born: September 27, 1957 (age 69); Dallas, Texas, USA
- Occupation: University professor
- Title: Peter S. Knox III Distinguished Chair of Accounting at Augusta University
- Spouse: Divorced
- Children: Two

Academic background
- Education: University of New Orleans; University of Tennessee
- Thesis: (1982)
- Doctoral advisor: Wayne J. Morse

Academic work
- Discipline: Financial Accounting
- Institutions: University of New Orleans; University of Alabama; University of Southern Mississippi; Augusta University

Michael Timothy Dugan (born 1957) is an accounting academic, currently serving as Professor of Accounting at Augusta University. He is noted for research contributions in the area of predictive ability and market-based archival research. Peers external to his home institution have recognized Dugan for teaching excellence.

== Early life and education ==
Dugan was born on September 27, 1957, as the youngest of the four children of Albert Francis Dugan and Ruth Margaret Dugan (née Welsh). Albert Dugan was a geophysicist employed by Mobil Oil Company in Dallas, Texas, and was transferred to his hometown of New Orleans, Louisiana, in 1959. Michael Dugan attended a Roman Catholic parochial school in New Orleans and subsequently graduated from Jesuit High School of New Orleans in 1975.

Dugan matriculated with a Bachelor of Science in Accounting at the University of New Orleans in 1978 after three years of study. During this period he completed the Certified Public Accountant examination in the State of Louisiana (1980). He subsequently enrolled in the doctoral program at the University of Tennessee, Knoxville, where he earned a Master of Accountancy degree (1981) and a Doctor of Business Administration (1982). Dugan's doctoral thesis was "An Empirical Examination of the Association Between the Degree of Operating Leverage and the Incidence of Receipt of Uncertainty Qualifications". This work examined how companies' business risk can influence the type of external audit opinion received.

== Teaching career and research ==
Dugan became a tenure-track assistant professor at the University of New Orleans in 1982 following completion of his doctorate. There he began his research on the development of models to predict corporate bankruptcy. He remained on the faculty there through 1984. He then pursued a one-semester visiting professorship at Clarkson University immediately prior to moving to the University of Alabama. Dugan served at the University of Alabama from 1985 until 2010, with a two semester leave of absence at Auburn University from Fall 1991 through Spring 1992, where he held a named visiting professorship. During his tenure at the University of Alabama, Dugan achieved full professorship in 1995.

In 2010, Dugan became Horne Professor of Accountancy at the University of Southern Mississippi. There Dugan continued to pursue his research in the development of bankruptcy prediction models and win teaching and research awards. In 2014, Dugan relocated to Augusta University (then Georgia Regents University) to become Peter S. Knox Distinguished Chair of Accounting, where he remains as of the Spring semester 2017.

Dugan has developed bankruptcy prediction model limitations and accounting-based estimation techniques for corporate risk His assessments reveal limitations in the accuracy of some widely accepted bankruptcy prediction models. The estimation techniques provide measures of degrees of risk inherent in corporate stock.

=== Major publications ===
Dugan has 71 publications in the scholarly literature as of December 2019 with approximately 1100 citations according to Google Scholar. Selected additional major publications include:

- M. Dugan, D. Minyard, and K. Shriver, “A Re-examination of the Operating Leverage – Financial Leverage Tradeoff Hypothesis,” Quarterly Review of Economics and Finance (Fall 1994), pp. 327–334.
- M. Dugan and K. Shriver, “An Empirical Comparison of Alternative Methods for the Estimation of the Degree of Operating Leverage,” The Financial Review (May 1992), pp. 309–321.
- C. Zavgren, M. Dugan, and J. Reeve, “The Association Between Probabilities of Bankruptcy and Market Responses – A Test of Market Anticipation,” Journal of Business Finance and Accounting (Spring 1988), pp. 27–45.
- M. Dugan and T. Forsyth, “The Relationship Between Bankruptcy Model Predictions and Stock Market Perceptions of Bankruptcy,” The Financial Review (August 1995), pp. 507–527.

== Awards and recognition ==
Dugan received 10 teaching awards at the departmental, business school, university, and accounting professional levels, which includes his receipt of the Alabama State Society of CPAs 2009 Outstanding educator award. His 2010 publication entitled "The Impact of Academic Accounting Research on Professional Practice: An Analysis by the AAA Research Impact Task Force" received the Accounting Horizons Best Paper Award in 2010. In 2017, Augusta University awarded Dugan with their graduate school's outstanding research award for the recognition that his research brought to the university. Dugan received the 2020 Accounting Department Outstanding Alumnus Award from the University of New Orleans.

== Personal life ==
Dugan is a divorced father of two children and resides in Evans, Georgia.
