= Stephen Vincent Benét House =

United States historic place

- Stephen Vincent Benet House
- U.S. National Register of Historic Places
- U.S. National Historic Landmark
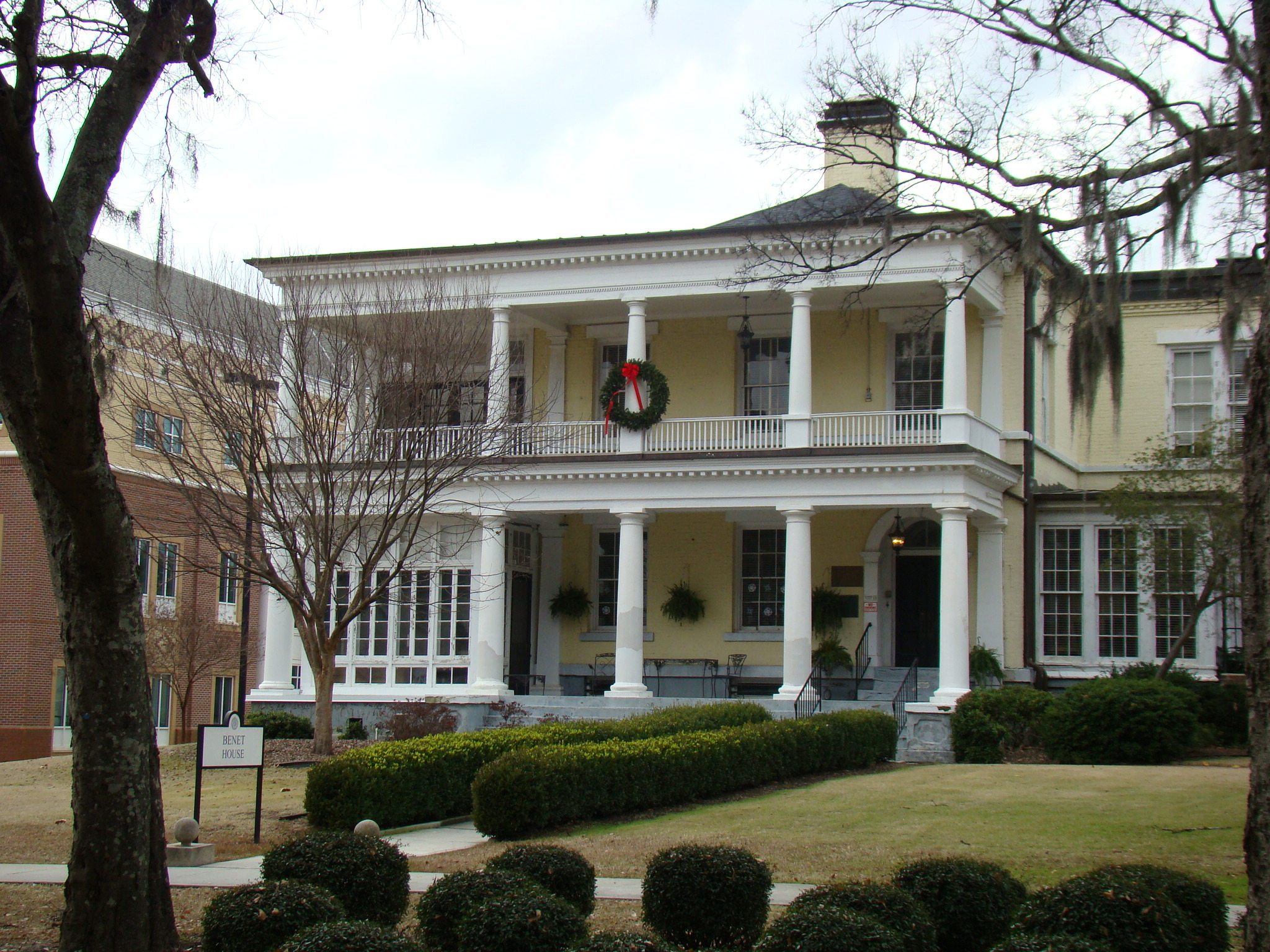

- Location within Georgia Location within the United States
- Location: 2500 Walton Way, Augusta, Georgia
- Coordinates: GA_type:landmark 33.47580°N 82.02407°W
- Area: 64 acres (26 ha)
- Architectural style: Federal
- NRHP reference No.: 71000286

Significant dates
- Added to NRHP: November 11, 1971
- Designated NHL: November 11, 1971

The Stephen Vincent Benét House, commonly referred to as Benét House, is a historic house on the Summerville campus of Augusta University in Augusta, Georgia. The house was built 1827–29 as the Commandant's House of the Augusta Arsenal, and is a much-altered example of Federal period architecture. The house was designated a National Historic Landmark in 1971 for its association with the Pulitzer Prize-winning writer Stephen Vincent Benét (1898–1943), who lived here in the 1910s. The house, which housed the official residence of the Augusta State University for a time, presently houses the Summerville campus's office of admissions.

== Description and history ==
The Benét House is centrally located on the Summerville campus of Augusta University, and is one of a cluster of buildings that formerly made up part of the Augusta Arsenal. It is a two-story brick structure, built on a side hall plan, with a two-story porch wrapping across the front and around one side. The building's interior includes finishes from all periods of its occupation, and its exterior has also been added to and altered several times.

The house was built in 1827–29, after the federal government decided to move the Augusta Arsenal to this location. The arsenal played a key role in the American Civil War, when it was used by the Confederate Army, and again in the Spanish–American War. In 1911 Colonel J. Walker Benét was appointed its commandant, bringing with him his son Stephen. Stephen Benét lived here until 1915, and it is where he began his writing career, as well as being the only major surviving structure known to be associated with his life. Benét is best known for the 1928 poem John Brown's Body, for which he was awarded the 1929 Pulitzer Prize, and the class 1937 short story "The Devil and Daniel Webster".

== See also ==
- List of National Historic Landmarks in Georgia (U.S. state)
- National Register of Historic Places listings in Richmond County, Georgia
