= Augusta University =

Public university in Augusta, Georgia, US

Coordinates: 33.47170°N 81.98885°W

- Former name: List: Academy of Richmond County (1785–1925); Junior College of Augusta (1925–1958); Augusta College (1958–1996); Augusta State University (1996–2013); Medical Academy of Georgia (1828–1829); Medical Institute of the State of Georgia (1829–1833); Medical College of Georgia (1833–1873; 1950–2011); Medical Department of the University of Georgia (1873–1933); University of Georgia School of Medicine (1933–1950); Georgia Health Sciences University (2011–2013); Georgia Regents University (2013–2015)
- Motto: "It can be done"
- Type: Public research university
- Established: December 20, 1828; 197 years ago
- Parent institution: University System of Georgia
- Accreditation: SACS
- Academic affiliations: GRA; ORAU
- Endowment: $60.2 million (2025)
- President: Russell T. Keen
- Academic staff: 1,643
- Administrative staff: 3,500+
- Students: 9,813 (fall 2022)
- Postgraduates: 2,376 (fall 2022)
- Doctoral students: 1,324 (fall 2021)
- Location: Augusta, Georgia, U.S.
- Campus: Midsize city, 670 acres (2.7 km^{2})
- Other campuses: Albany; Fort Gordon; Rome; Savannah
- Newspaper: The Bell Ringer
- Colors: Blue and grey
- Nicknames: Jaguars; Jags
- Sporting affiliations: NCAA Division II – Peach Belt; Southland
- Mascot: Augustus the Jaguar
- Website: augusta.edu

Augusta University (AU) is a public research university and academic medical center in Augusta, Georgia, United States. It is part of the University System of Georgia and has satellite medical campuses in Savannah, Albany, and Rome, Georgia. It employs over 15,000 people, has more than 56,000 alumni, and is accredited by the Southern Association of Colleges and Schools. It is classified as a Research 2 university with High Research Spending and Doctorate Production and as a university with Community Engagement.

== History ==
Augusta University was officially formed January 8, 2013, from the consolidation of Augusta State University and Georgia Health Sciences University in Augusta, Georgia by order of the University System of Georgia Board of Regents. Georgia Health Sciences University was chartered in 1828, upon the request of Milton Antony and Joseph Adams Eve, by the state of Georgia as the Medical Academy of Georgia to offer a single course of lectures leading to a bachelor's degree. Augusta State University traces its roots to 1783, when the Academy of Richmond County was founded as a high school. It opened in 1785 and offered collegiate-level classes from its earliest days, and its classes were overseen by the Georgia General Assembly.

== Campus ==
Augusta University's main campus in Augusta, Georgia, encompasses more than 200 acres and has four local campuses. It is made up of the former campuses between Augusta State University and Georgia Health Sciences University, with additions from the University System of Georgia Board of Regents.

=== Health Sciences ===
The medical college of the university, its oldest and founding college, began as the Medical Academy of Georgia in 1828, moving into the now historic Old Medical College Building in 1835. The present Health Sciences campus was formed in 1913 as the college moved to the Newton building and expanded from there, with the Dugas Building in 1937 marking the earliest building currently on the campus. The first clinical facility opened as the Eugene Talmadge Memorial Hospital in 1956.

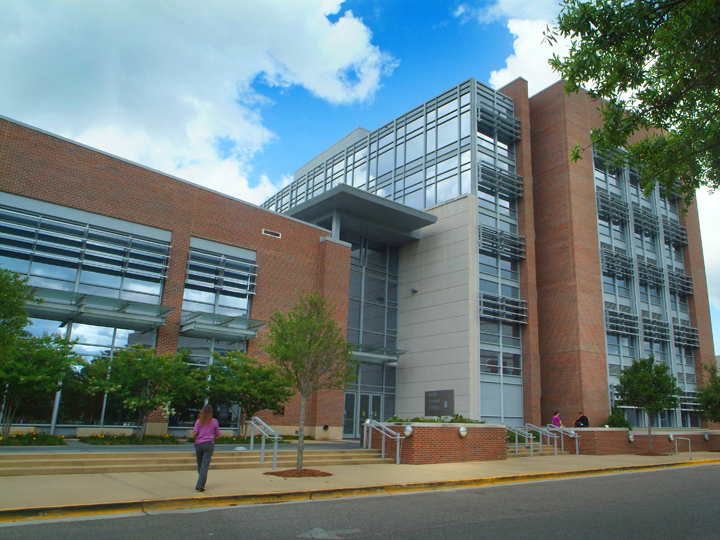
The Health Sciences Building hosts a variety of departments and classes.

Located in Augusta's Medical District, the Health Sciences campus features all medical programs of the university, as well as the Health Sciences Building, Interdisciplinary Research Building, Wellness Center, Cancer Center, Medical College of Georgia, The Dental College of Georgia, and the College of Science and Mathematics.

The Health Sciences campus also contains the Augusta University Medical Center, the Children's Hospital of Georgia, and Augusta University's two residence halls, Oak Hall and Elm Hall, which opened in Fall 2016.

=== Summerville ===
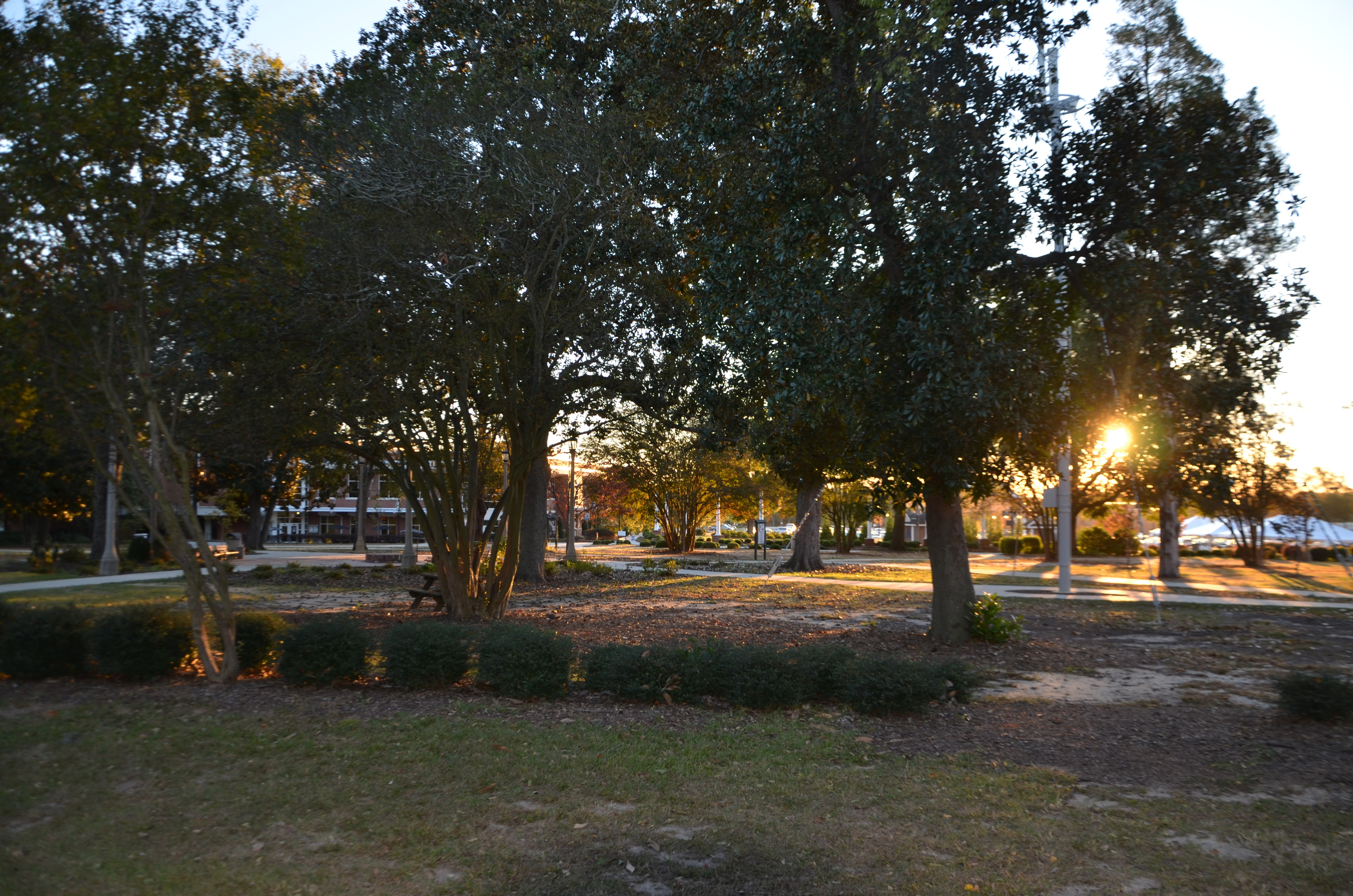
Augusta University Summerville campus

The Summerville campus was originally used as a United States Army arsenal, established in downtown Augusta in 1816 and relocated to the campus in 1827. By the turn of the twentieth century, the arsenal's prominence waned, beginning with the Spanish–American War in that the arsenal produced manufacturing equipment, seacoast targets, and was a repair station. In World War I, the station repaired rifles and small arms, but produced ordnance material and fire control operations for World War II.

In 1955, the arsenal was closed, and two years later the land was given to the local Board of Education, which used it to open the Junior College of Augusta. In 1958, the name changed to Augusta College, and in 1996 to Augusta State University.

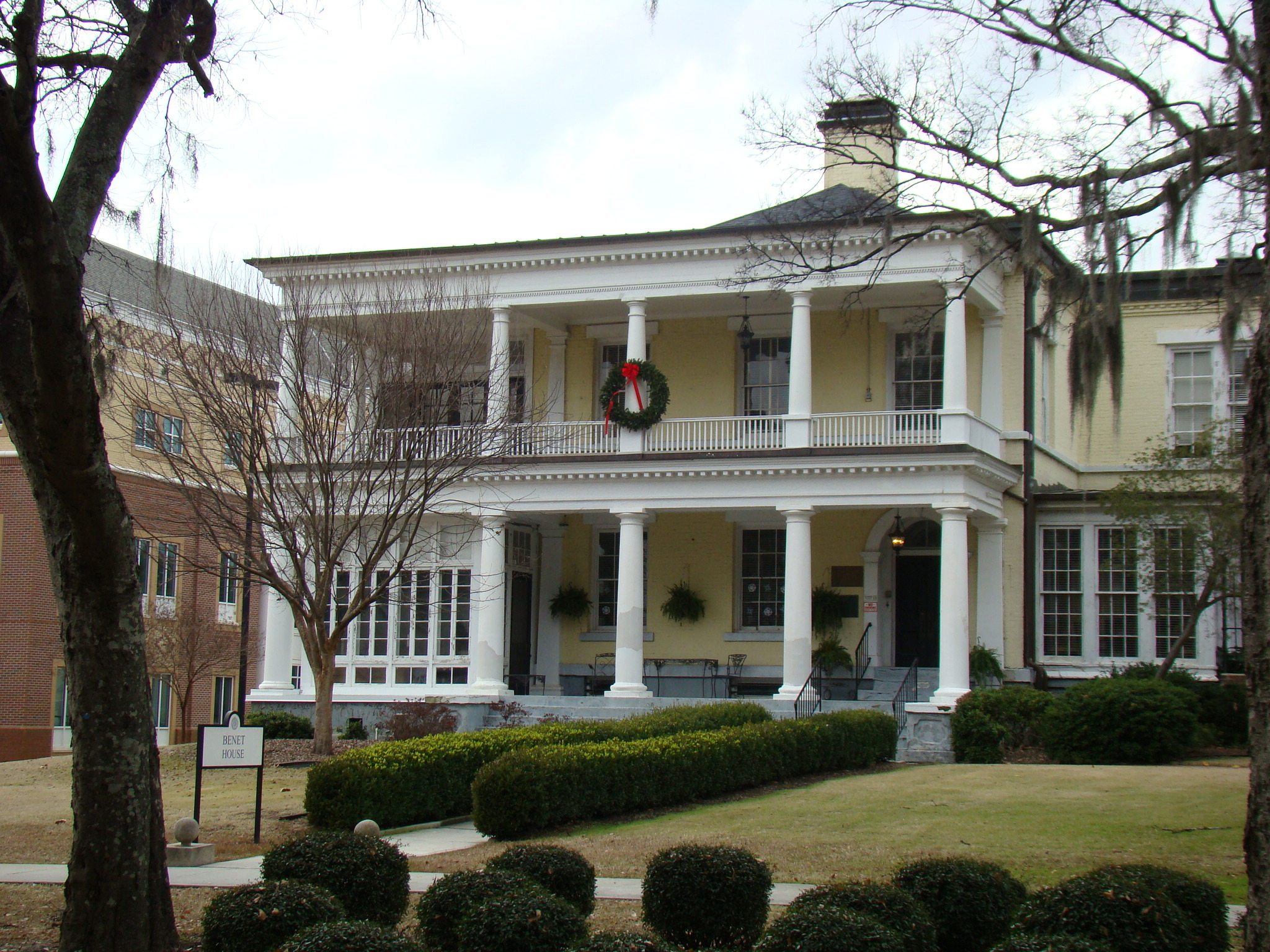
Historic Benet House

Located on Walton Way, the Summerville campus houses many of the undergraduate programs and the Jaguar Student Activities Center. The Maxwell Performing Arts Theatre, the History Walk, the Mary S. Byrd Gallery of Art, The Honors Program, and the Maxwell Alumni House are all found on this campus. In addition, the James M. Hull College of Business, College of Education and Human Development, and Pamplin College of Arts, Humanities, and Social Sciences are located here.

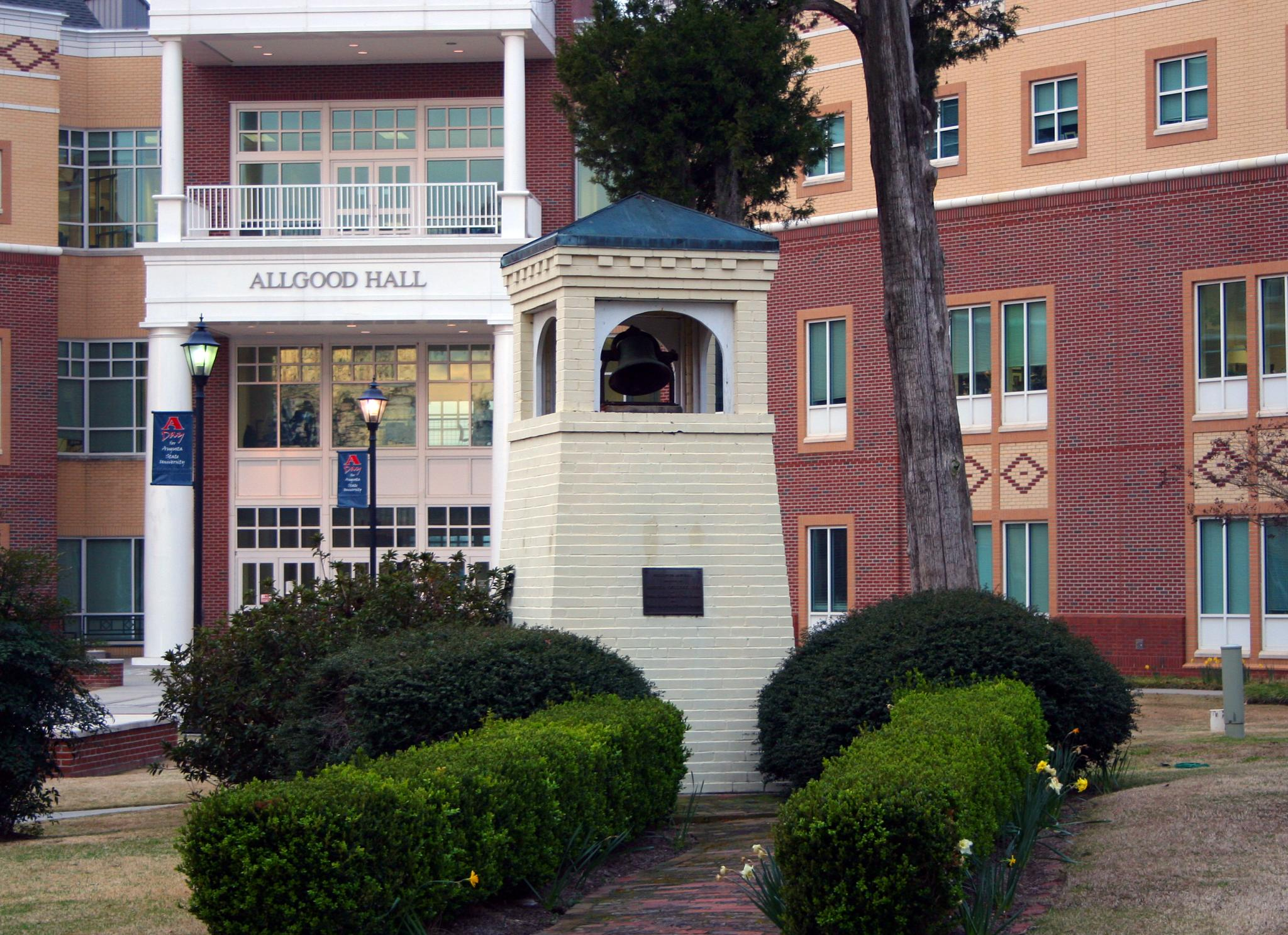
The Hull College of Business is primarily located in Allgood Hall on the Summerville campus.

The campus was formerly well known for the Arsenal Oak, a tree that contained wood believed to be 250–400 years old, until it was cut down in June 2004 because of disease. A dedication ceremony of the replanting of the new Arsenal Oak took place on Friday, April 29, 2016, on the front lawn of the Benét House. The descendant was grown from an acorn of the original Arsenal Oak.

=== Forest Hills ===
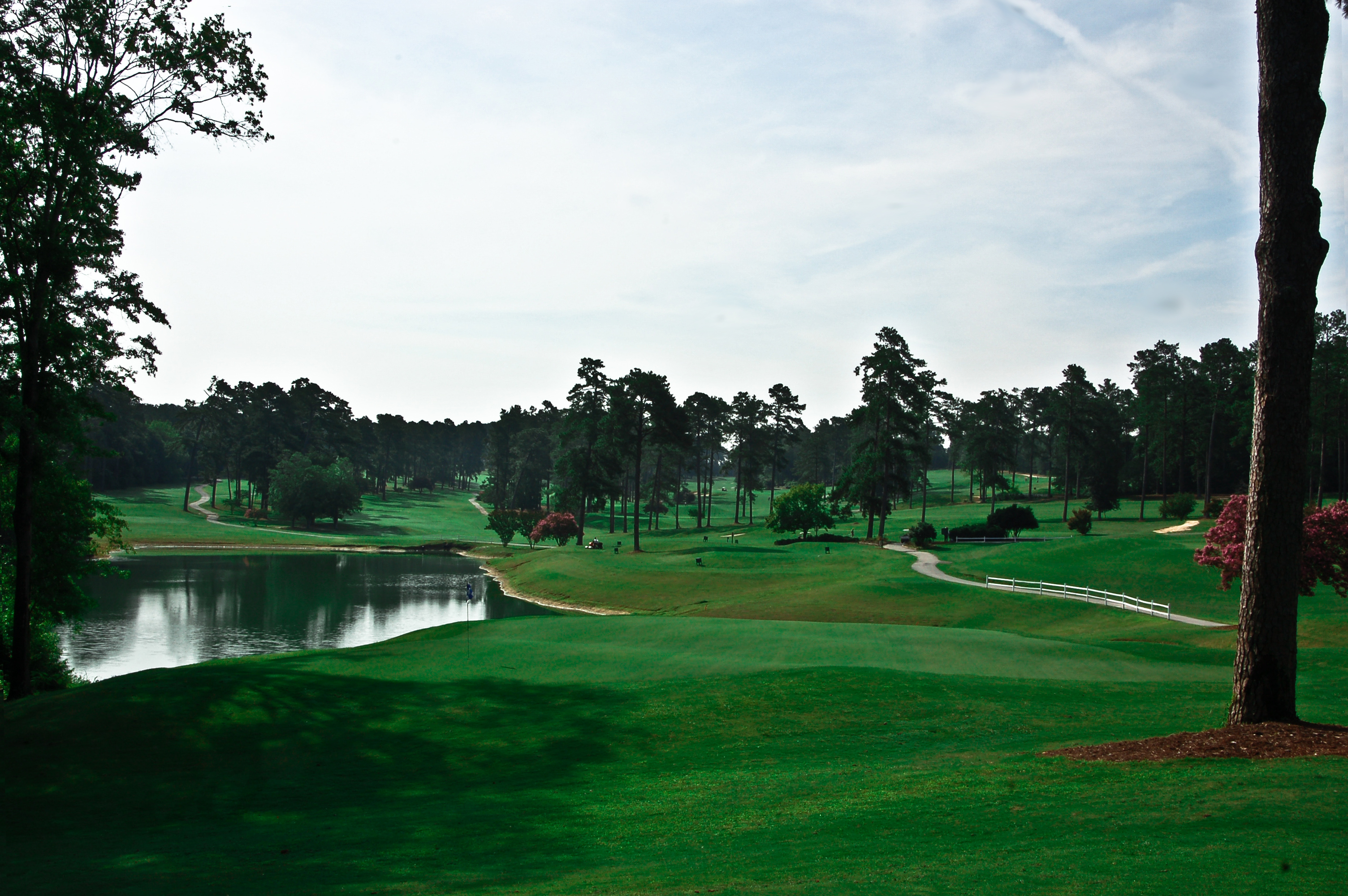
A par 3 hole at Forest Hills

Then-Augusta State University opened a second campus in 1991 for athletics, complete with a 3,800-seat arena—Christenberry Fieldhouse, named in 2003—and softball and baseball fields. The J. Fleming Norvell Golf House was added in 2007 with an adjacent driving range, putting green, and chipping area.

The campus contains Forest Hills Golf Club, home of the men's and women's golf teams and a public course available for play, and the 500-bed University Village student housing.

=== The Nathan Deal Campus for Innovation ===
The former Georgia Golf Hall of Fame riverfront property in Downtown Augusta has been redeveloped to house the Augusta University Cyber Institute and the Georgia Cyber Innovation and Training Center which opened in July 2018. The Riverfront Campus was named in honor of Georgia Governor Nathan Deal who was on hand for the opening ceremony of the Hull McKnight Building on the campus. The building is also the home of the university's newest School of Computer and Cyber Sciences. The second building, Shaffer MacCartney Building, opened in January 2019 with potential plans to expand more on the property.

=== Other ===
Augusta University has three satellite campuses for medical student clinical study, in Albany, Rome, and Savannah.

== Rankings ==
Academic rankings

National
- U.S. News & World Report: 317 (tie)

In 2026, U.S. News & World Report ranked Augusta University tied for No.317 out of 427 National Universities, tied for No.168 out of 226 in Top Public Schools, tied for No.390 out of 535 in Business Programs, tied for No.135 out of 671 in Nursing, tied for No.350 out of 587 in Computer Science, and tied for No.269 out of 418 in Top Performers on Social Mobility. The university's medical college was ranked Tier 3 in Best Medical Schools: Research and Tier 3 in Best Medical Schools: Primary Care by U.S. News & World Report.

== Undergraduate admissions ==
Undergraduate demographics as of Fall 2023
Race and ethnicity	Total
White	46%
International student	1%
Hispanic	10%
Two or more races	6%
Black	26%
Asian	8%
American Indian/Alaska Native	0%
Economic diversity
Low-income (Note: The percentage of students who received an income-based federal Pell grant intended for low-income students.)	41%
Affluent (Note: The percentage of students who are a part of the American middle class at the bare minimum.)	59%

In 2024, Augusta University accepted 85.5% of undergraduate applicants. Augusta University did not report high school GPA data for its accepted students. Standardized test scores reported were an average 1120 SAT score (78% of applicants submitting), or an average 22 ACT score (25% submitting).

== Partnerships ==
=== Former UGA–MCG medical partnership ===
The College of Nursing had a satellite campus in Athens. AU's Medical College of Georgia (MCG) operated a partnership with the University of Georgia (UGA) on the University of Georgia's new Health Sciences Campus, also in Athens. The University of Georgia has since started its own nursing school.

In 2010, MCG partnered with the University of Georgia to create the UGA-MCG Medical Partnership. The Medical Partnership combined the experience of one of the nation's first medical schools with the resources of one of the nation's most comprehensive leading nationally ranked research universities. The University of Georgia has since started its own medical school.

To accommodate its new Health Sciences Campus, in 2011 the University of Georgia acquired the 58-acre former U.S. Navy Supply Corps School which had extensive landscaped green spaces, more than 400 trees, and several historic buildings located on the hospital and medical office corridor of Prince Avenue near downtown Athens.

=== ECRH–AU medical partnership ===
East Central Regional Hospital, with two locations in Augusta and Gracewood, was taken over by Augusta University for administrative purposes in 2009 after it was considered for closure. The hospital specializes in behavioral health and mental disabilities. The university's College of Nursing is now actively involved in daily hospital activities including hiring nurses for the hospital, partnering with other institutions to educate students in masters in nursing programs regarding mental healthcare, and utilizing a Dedicated Education Unit to help guide undergraduate nursing students in patient care.

=== US Army Cyber Center of Excellence at Fort Eisenhower–AU Cyber Institute partnership ===
Fort Gordon is home to the US Army Cyber Center of Excellence and the US Army Cyber Command. The partnership will strengthen the relationship between AU and ARCYBER by assisting soldiers transferring their training to the private sector as well as by sharing resources. The ribbon-cutting and opening ceremony of Augusta University's Cyber Institute took place in University Hall on the Summerville campus on Friday, September 16, 2016.

=== East Georgia State College Augusta ===
In 2013, East Georgia State College (EGSC), a University System of Georgia institution based in the rural city of Swainsboro, began a collaboration with AU to serve Augusta-area students who do not meet AU's freshman admission requirements. Students enrolled in the program were enrolled as EGSC students and attended classes on the Summerville Campus. After completing 30 semester hours of college level coursework and attaining a minimum GPA of 2.3, students could then elect to transfer into a bachelor's program at AU. This collaboration was modeled after EGSC's long-standing collaboration with Georgia Southern University and replaced the former "University College" program.

In April 2025, the USG Board of Regents approved the consolidation of EGSC and Georgia Southern University, effective January 1, 2026. EGSC Augusta was phased out following the conclusion of the 2026 spring semester.

== Medical illustration program ==
Augusta University is one of five accredited programs offering a Masters of Science in Medical Illustration in North America in the college of Allied Health Science. The program is accredited by the Commission on Accreditation of Allied Health Education Programs (CAAHEP).

== Athletics ==
The Augusta athletic teams are called the Jaguars. The university is a member of the Division II ranks of the National Collegiate Athletic Association (NCAA), primarily competing in the Peach Belt Conference (PBC) since the 1991–92 academic year; except in women's and men's golf, which those sports compete in the NCAA Division I ranks as an affiliate member of the Southland Conference.

Augusta competes in 13 intercollegiate varsity sports: Men's sports include baseball, basketball, cross country, golf, tennis & track & field; while women's sports include basketball, cross country, golf, softball, tennis, track & field and volleyball.

=== Golf ===
The men's golf program captured the school's first NCAA Division I Men's Golf National Championship on June 6, 2010, in Ooltewah, Tennessee, when the Jaguars defeated Oklahoma State University. The Jags then became the first Division I men's golf program in 27 years to repeat as National Champions on June 5, 2011, when they defeated the University of Georgia at Karsten Creek Golf Club in Stillwater, Oklahoma.

== Notable alumni and faculty ==
Notable alumni and faculty of Augusta University and its predecessor institutions include:

- Doug Barnard, Jr., United States congressman
- Chen Be-yue, Justice of the Constitutional Court of the Republic of China
- John Britton, physician, former professor, murdered by an anti-abortion extremist in 1994
- Paul Broun, U.S. congressman
- Joelle Carter, actress
- Edward J. Cashin, historian; professor emeritus of history; Director, Center for the Study of Georgia History
- Hervey M. Cleckley, psychiatrist, co-author of the book that was the basis for The Three Faces of Eve film of the same name
- Judith Ortiz Cofer, author
- Leila Denmark, pediatrician and medical researcher; co-developer of the pertussis vaccine
- Michael T. Dugan, accounting academic; Professor of Accounting at Augusta University
- Phil Gingrey, U.S. congressman
- Robert Benjamin Greenblatt, physician and medical researcher specializing in endocrinology; served as professor and chairman of MCG's Department of Endocrinology and was well-known for his work in women's reproductive health
- Isaac S. Hopkins, first president of Georgia Institute of Technology
- Anthony Kellman, Professor of English and Creative Writing; poet, novelist and musician
- Darrell Kirch, Association of American Medical Colleges (AAMC) president
- Marguerite Littleton Kearney, director, Division of Extramural Science Programs, National Institute of Nursing Research
- Lee Ann Liska, hospital administrator specializing in health system optimization; CEO of Augusta University Medical Center and president of Vanderbilt University Medical Center
- Raymond Moody, psychiatrist, physician, and author, most widely known for his books about afterlife and near-death experiences
- Michael Patrick Mulroy, Deputy Assistant Secretary of Defense for Secretary James Mattis
- Simona Hunyadi Murph, scientist, engineer & inventor at Savannah River National Laboratory; adjunct professor at University of Georgia
- Matthew L. Nathan, 37th Surgeon General of the United States Navy
- No-Hee Park, Dean, UCLA School of Dentistry, and notable researcher of oral (head and neck) cancer and aging
- Samuel L. Perry, Professor of Sociology at the University of Oklahoma
- Patrick Reed, PGA Tour golfer
- Garret Siler, former NBA player, currently holds the NCAA record for field goal percentage
- Ed Tarver, United States Attorney
- Corbett H. Thigpen, psychiatrist, co-author of the book that was the basis for The Three Faces of Eve film of the same name
- Laken Riley, nursing student, murder victim, namesake of the Laken Riley Act

== See also ==
- History of Augusta University
- Old Medical College
- Medical College of Georgia
- Augusta University Medical Center
- Medical District (Augusta, Georgia)
- Stephen Vincent Benet House
- List of medical schools in the United States
- List of nursing schools in the United States
- List of dental schools in the United States
