= Old Medical College Building =

Historic place in Georgia, United States

- U.S. National Register of Historic Places
- U.S. National Historic Landmark
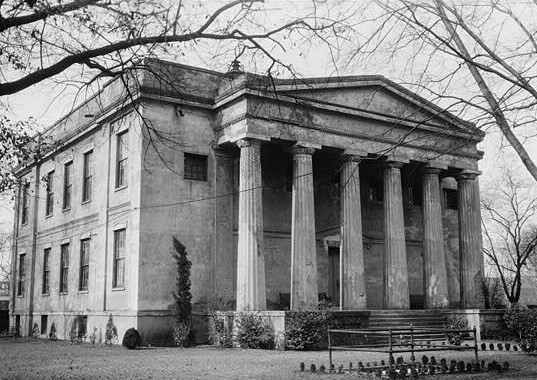
- HABS photo from 1934

- Location within Georgia Location within the United States
- Location: 598 Telfair, at 6th Street, Augusta, Georgia
- Coordinates: 33°28′13″N 81°57′47″W
- Area: 1.51 acres (0.61 ha)
- Built: 1834
- Architect: Charles B. Cluskey
- Architectural style: Greek Revival
- NRHP reference No.: 72000398

Significant dates
- Added to NRHP: March 16, 1972
- Designated NHL: June 19, 1996

The Old Medical College Building is a historic academic building at 598 Telfair Street in Augusta, Georgia, United States. It was built in 1835 for the Medical College of Georgia, then and now one of the leading medical schools of the American South. It was declared a National Historic Landmark in 1996 for its sophisticated Greek Revival architecture, and for the role the school played in the establishment of the American Medical Association and the standardization of medical practices.

== Description and history ==
The Old Medical College Building is located in central Augusta, behind Augusta City Hall at the corner of Telfair and 6th Streets. It is a two-story Greek Revival structure, built out of brick covered with stucco scored to resemble stone. Its front facade, facing Telfair Street, has a projecting Greek temple portico, with six massive fluted Doric columns supporting an entablature and gabled pediment. The main entry is at the center, and there are seven small square windows evenly spaced on the second level. The side walls are five bays wide. A parapet surrounds a shallow-pitch hip roof, which rises to a central dome. The interior housed what were, for the 1830s, generous quarters for a medical school, including several laboratory spaces, lecture halls, and a library.

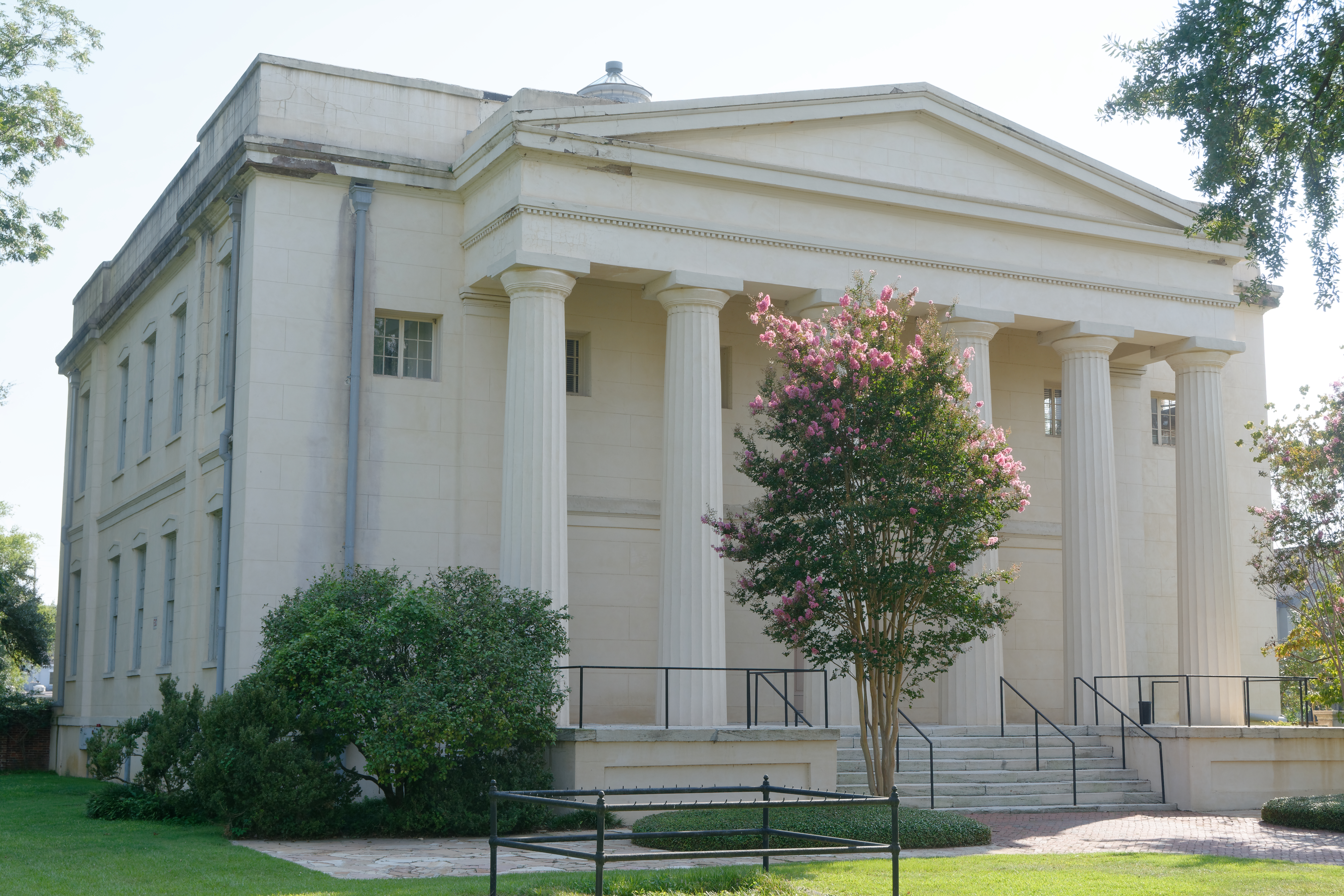
The building in 2017

The Medical College of Georgia was chartered in 1829 as a state-chartered private institution. This building was built as its main facility in 1835 to a design by Charles Blaney Cluskey, one of America's early trained architects and a proponent of the "new" Greek Revival style. The building was lauded at its completion for its Classical proportions. It served the medical school until 1913, when it moved to new quarters. The school is now part of Augusta University.

The school's faculty was one of the principal forces behind the establishment of the American Medical Association in 1847, promoting the establishment of guidelines for medical practices, medical education standards, and guidelines for the accreditation of medical schools, at a time when no such standards and guidelines existed.

The school's old building was taken over in 1913 by the adjacent Richmond Academy, which used it as a vocational training center until 1926. It saw use over much of the remaining 20th century by a variety of organizations, notably including the Sand Hills Garden Club, under whose tenure the latticework brick fence was built (1933), and the grounds landscaped. In 1987, the building was acquired by the Medical College of Georgia Foundation, which restored it to its 19th-century appearance, while also upgrading its systems to modern standards.

== See also ==
- List of National Historic Landmarks in Georgia (U.S. state)
- National Register of Historic Places listings in Richmond County, Georgia
