= Chen Be-yue =

- 陳碧玉
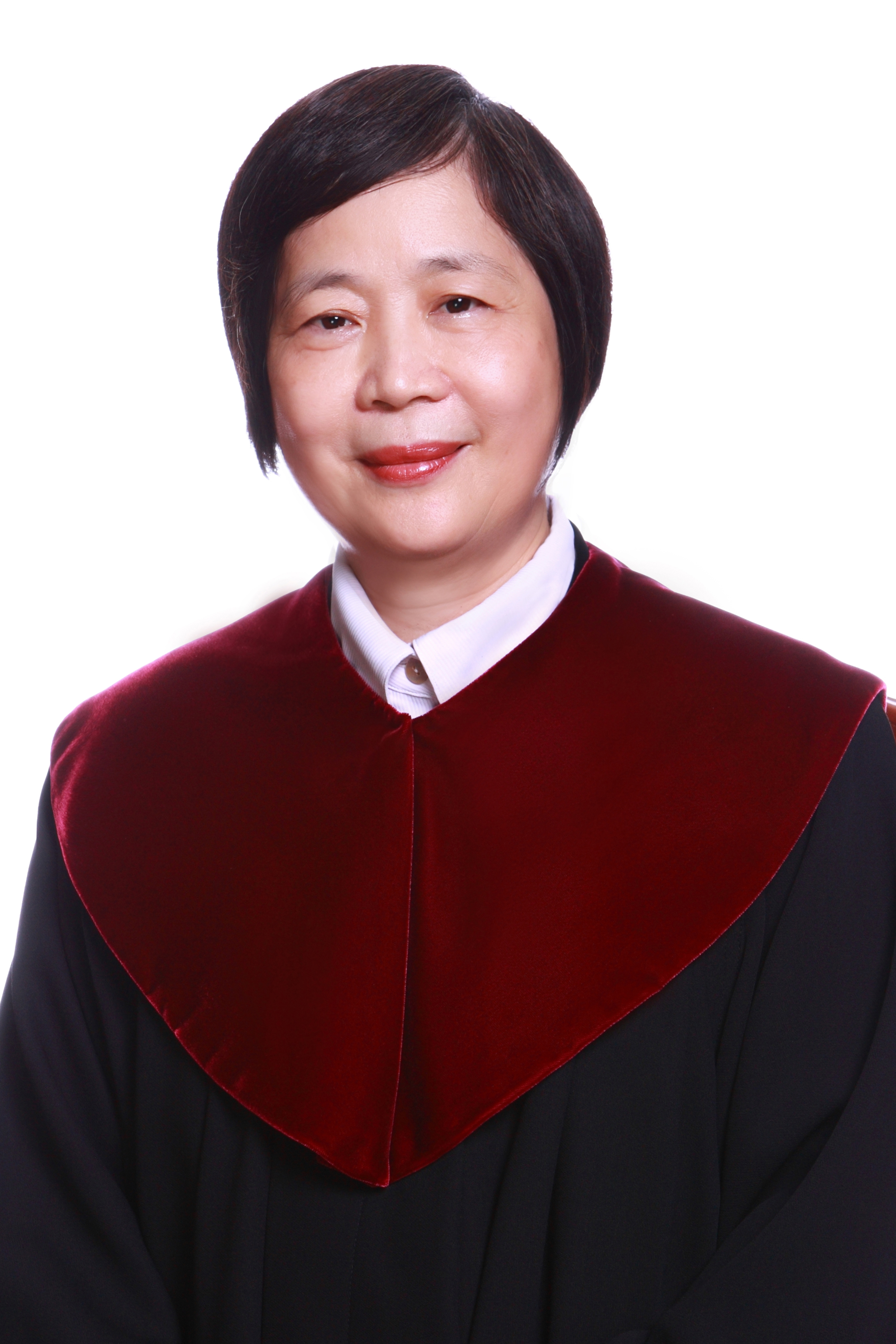
- Born: 14 July 1948 (age 78)
- Education: National Chengchi University (LLB, LLM); Augusta State University (MBA)
- Occupation: Judge

Chen Be-yue (Chinese: 陳碧玉; pinyin: Chén Bìyù; born 14 July 1948) is a Taiwanese member of the Council of Grand Justices, the constitutional court of the Republic of China on Taiwan. She was confirmed to this position in June 2011.

== Career ==
Chen was a judge in Taiwan, but resigned from her position in 1983 and emigrated to the United States. She returned to Taiwan and was reinstated as a judge in 1996 by the Judicial Yuan. She went on to become a justice of the Supreme Court and later head of the Judicial Personnel Study Center. She stated that she is most proud of her work in translating judicial rulings and expanding the role of women in the judiciary.

Chen was nominated to the Council of Grand Justices in April 2011 by President Ma Ying-jeou. Members of the Legislative Yuan questioned Ma's decision, as Chen had previously been a U.S. citizen and had also obtained a U.S. green card again for a short period while serving on the Supreme Court. The controversy over Chen's green card led opposition Democratic Progressive Party legislators to propose amendments to previously tabled legislation to disallow public servants from holding permanent residency in foreign countries. However, lawmakers eventually confirmed Chen along with Ma's three other judicial nominees on 14 June 2011. Chen would step down from the Constitutional Court on 30 September 2019.

== Personal life ==
Chen attended National Chengchi University in Taipei, where she earned an LL.B. degree in 1971 and an LL.M. in 1976. She emigrated from Taiwan to the United States in 1983; while living there, she completed a M.B.A. at Georgia's Augusta College (the predecessor of Augusta State University) in 1989. She naturalized as a U.S. citizen in 1992. She later returned to Taiwan, and relinquished U.S. citizenship in 1996 upon her reinstatement as a judge there.

Her daughter continues to reside in the United States; Chen later obtained permanent residence status again in the United States in January 2008, so she could aid in raising her newborn granddaughter without worrying about visa issues (as Taiwan was not a member of the United States' Visa Waiver Program at that time); however, she cancelled her permanent resident status in September 2009.
