= Medical College of Georgia =

Public medical school in Augusta, Georgia, US

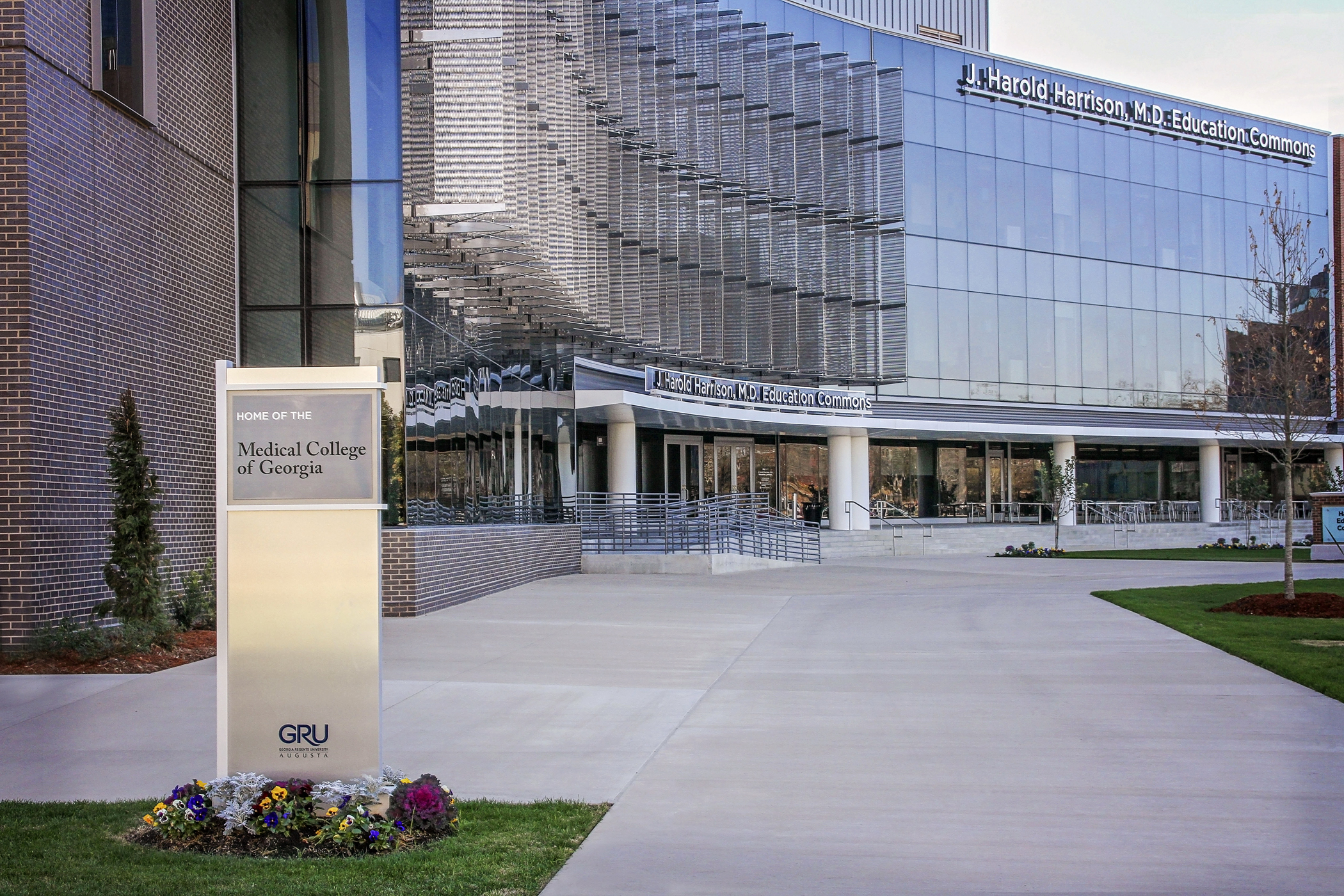
- The educational home of MCG pictured in 2015
- Type: Public
- Established: 1828; 198 years ago
- Parent institution: Augusta University
- Endowment: $330.6 million (2024)
- Dean: David C. Hess
- Faculty: 552
- Students: 643
- Location: Augusta, Georgia, U.S. 33.47065°N 81.98891°W
- Website: augusta.edu/mcg
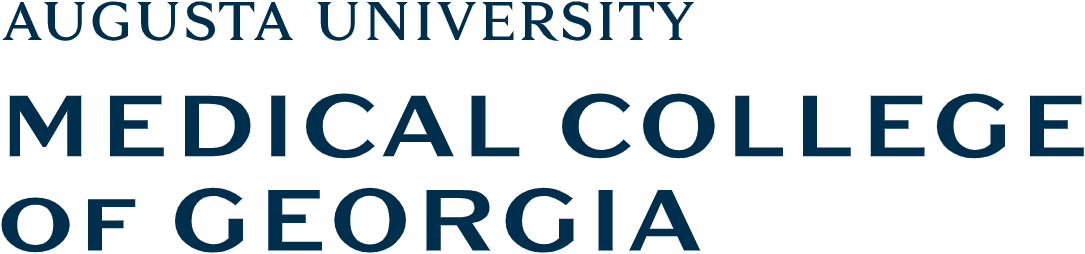

The Medical College of Georgia (often referred to as MCG) is the medical school of Augusta University, the state's oldest public medical school, and one of the top 10 largest medical schools in the United States. Established in 1828 as the Medical Academy of Georgia, MCG is the oldest, and a founding, school of Augusta University, and played a role in the establishment of the American Medical Association and the standardization of medical practices. It is the third-oldest medical school in the Southeast and the 13th oldest in the nation. With 22 departments, it offers both a Doctor of Medicine (MD) as well as MD-PhD, MD-MPH, and MD-MBA degrees. Its national ranking in research is Tier 3, and its ranking in primary care is Tier 2, both out of four tiers of 196 ranked medical schools.

In response to the shortage of physicians, the school has grown in recent years. Beginning in 2010, MCG expanded to include multiple regional campuses across the state. In addition to its main clinical campus in Augusta, clinical training is offered at campuses in Albany, Rome, Savannah/Brunswick, and in Athens at the University of Georgia. The Athens campus is the University of Georgia's Health Science Campus where 40 of the school's 230 students obtain full, four-year training as part of a partnership with the University of Georgia which, in 2024, created its own medical school.

== History ==
MCG was founded in 1828, by Milton Antony and Joseph Adams Eve, as the Medical Academy of Georgia by the Medical Society of Augusta to address a need to train new physicians. Its first seven students enrolled in a one-year course of lectures and clinical training hosted in the Old Medical College building, leading to the bachelor of medicine degree. The next year, the governor signed a legislative act altering the charter of 1828 by expanding the curriculum to two years, culminating in a doctor of medicine degree, and changing the name to the Medical Institute of Georgia. The school changed its name in 1833 to its current name, and for the next 80 years continued to operate with an emphasis on research and training physicians.

Many discoveries were made by MCG faculty, including the first hysterectomy performed in the United States and the first documented case of sickle cell disease.

== Rankings ==
For 2024, out of four tiers of 196 medical schools ranked by U S News & World Report MCG was ranked Tier 2 in Best Medical Schools: Primary Care, Tier 3 in Best Medical Schools: Research, No.87 in Most Graduates Practicing in Primary Care Fields, No.89 in Most Diverse Medical Schools, No.45 in Most Graduates Practicing in Rural Areas, and No.38 in Most Graduates Practicing in Medically Underserved Areas.

== Admissions ==
More than 3,100 students have applied for 230 first-year slots. Matriculating students entering for 2019-2020 had an average grade point average of 3.80 and MCAT score of 511, in the 82 percentile and well above the national average for students accepted to US medical schools.

For the 2025 entering class, there were 3,244 applications and only 304 students matriculated. That makes the acceptance rate around 9.37%. The average GPA for accepted students at this time was 3.84 and the average MCAT score was 513.

== Campuses ==
The main campus resides in Augusta, Georgia on the Health Sciences campus of Augusta University. All first- and second-year students attend classes at either the Augusta main campus or the University of Georgia Health Science Campus in Athens through the AU/UGA Medical Partnership, UGA starting its own medical school in 2024.

In a student's third and fourth years, a student may choose to study on the main Augusta campus, based at Augusta University Medical Center, or to study at a regional campus for their clinical rotations. MCG has four satellite campuses:

The Southwest campus, in Albany, was the first residential campus opened in 2010. It marked the school's first efforts to increase the number of physicians produced in the state of Georgia, a problem the university had vowed to address.

The Southeast campus in Savannah and Brunswick, opened in 2011 with seven third-year students beginning rotations at two medical centers and hosts nearly 40 students annually.

The Northwest campus, located in Rome, opened in 2013. Students work with the Harbin Clinic, Floyd Medical Center, and Redmond Regional Medical Center, with some classes and training provided on facilities provided by the centers.

The University of Georgia Health Sciences Campus in Athens is where students were first hosted by the University of Georgia in 2010, while its own medical school was started in 2024, aimed at growing the number of excellently prepared physicians the state produces.

== Traditions ==
=== White Coat Ceremony ===
First-year medical students are given their white coats in an annual tradition to mark their first steps as a medical professional. The jacket is shorter than the long coats full-fledged doctors wear, to mark them as students until they earn their full degree.

=== Raft Debate ===
Every year, differences in medical specialties are highlighted by one question: "A surgeon, an internist, and an obstetrician (or alternatively, a pediatrician or psychiatrist) are aboard a simulated sinking ship. Their only escape is a one-person raft. Who should be the sole survivor?"

=== Match Day ===
Every year for the NRMP Match Day, the Medical College of Georgia celebrates with a costume-themed ceremony. Students are encouraged to dress in costumes that align with the year's theme as they celebrate finding out their match locations.

== Notable people ==
=== Alumni ===
- Hervey M. Cleckley
- Leila Denmark

=== Faculty ===
- Robert Benjamin Greenblatt
