= Milton Antony =

American physician (1789–1839)

Milton M. Antony
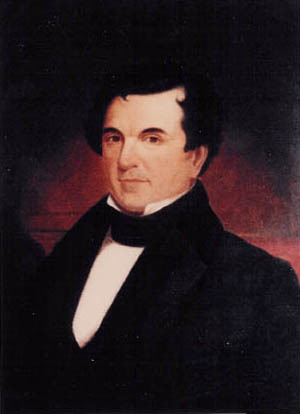
- Born: August 7, 1789; Henry County, Virginia U.S.
- Died: September 19, 1839 (aged 50); Augusta, Georgia U.S.
- Education: University of Pennsylvania Perelman School of Medicine
- Known for: Establishing the Medical College of Georgia and Southern Medical Journal
- Spouse: Nancy Godwin (m. 1809)
- Scientific career
- Fields: Obstetrics, Gynaecology
- Workplaces: Medical College of Georgia (Augusta) (1832-1839)
- Academic advisors: Joel Abbot

Milton M. Antony Sr. (August 7, 1789 – September 19, 1839) was an American medical doctor, gynecologist and educator who is considered by many to be the "founding father" of the Medical College of Georgia.

== Biography ==
=== Early life and education ===
Antony was born on August 7, 1789, to James Antony (1752–1815), a military officer, and Ann Tate (1752–1834). At age sixteen, he started an apprenticeship under Joel Abbot, and three years later he enrolled into the University of Pennsylvania School of Medicine. Antony was only able to attend one course though, due to financial reasons, making him leave early without a diploma.

In 1809, Antony married Nancy Godwin and had eleven children with her, one of them being Milton Antony Jr., who was the father of Edwin Le Roy Antony, an U.S. Representative.

=== World's first thoracotomy ===
After practicing medicine in Monticello and New Orleans, Antony would settle in Augusta where in 1821, he would perform the world's first successful thoracotomy on a seventeen-year-old boy who likely had a case of pulmonary hemangiopericytoma. After four months of the initial recovery, the patient died of measles. He would publish his results of the thoracotomy in the Philadelphia Journal of Medical and Physical Sciences as a "Case of Extensive Caries of the Fifth and Sixth Ribs, and Disorganization of the Greater Part of the Right Lobe of the Lungs" in 1823.

=== Establishment of the Medical College of Georgia ===
In 1822, Antony argued that the criteria for admission into the medical profession wasn't demanding enough and believed that the course requirements should be extended in both duration and diversity of fields covered, and should have more practical training. Antony also advocated for individual medical societies being established, and in 1825 requested the state legislature to appoint a State Board of Medical Examiners. After his request was granted, he became the first president of the board.

Three years after the board was established, Antony would again apply to the legislature, alongside Joseph Adams Eve, whom he taught classes to aspiring students with, for the Medical Academy of Georgia to be established, which would later be renamed as the Medical College of Georgia. It was then established on December 20, 1828, when governor John Forsyth signed the school's charter. Antony would serve alongside Ignatius P. Garvin and Lewis DeSaussure Ford as one of the first three faculty members. The academy was authorized to confer the degree Bachelor of Medicine after one year of courses.

After the success of the college, Antony and other faculty asked the legislature to grant the degree Doctor of Medicine upon graduation. In 1829, Antony was elected a member of the executive committee, and from 1832 to 1839 he served as professor of institutes and practice of medicine and of midwifery and diseases of women and children. In 1835, Antony was appointed vice president of its board of trustees.

=== Later life and death ===
In 1836, Antony became the founding editor of the newly established Southern Medical and Surgical Journal, which was considered by some as "one of the best medical journals of the antebellum south". The intention of the journal was to keep practicing physicians of Georgia and surrounding states informed on new developments and medical trends to improve medical care and standards.

Antony remained as editor of the journal and faculty of the college until his death on September 19, 1839, due to yellow fever. Antony was, upon the request of his faculty, buried in college grounds and a tablet in his memory was erected in the wall of the principal lecture room of the college.
