= Augusta State University =

Public university in Augusta, Georgia, US

- Former names: Augusta College
- Type: Public university
- Active: January 27, 1785–August 10, 2012
- President: William A. Bloodworth Jr. (last president, 1993–2012); Shirley S. Kenny (interim, July–December 2012)
- Academic staff: 200
- Administrative staff: 300
- Students: 6,919
- Undergraduates: 5,628
- Postgraduates: 960
- Location: Augusta, Georgia, U.S. 33.4768°N 82.0230°W
- Campus: Urban
- Colors: Blue & white
- Sporting affiliations: NCAA Division II Peach Belt Conference
- Mascot: Jaguars
- Website: Archive of aug.edu at the Wayback Machine (archive index)

Augusta State University was a public university in Augusta, Georgia. It merged with Georgia Health Sciences University in 2012 to form Georgia Regents University, later known as Augusta University.

== History ==
Augusta State University was founded as a high school named Academy of Richmond County in 1783. It opened in 1785 and offered collegiate-level classes from its earliest days, and its classes were overseen by the Georgia state legislature. Graduates were accepted into colleges as sophomores or juniors. Operation of the academy was overseen by a board of trustees until 1909, when control was passed to the Augusta Board of Education. The college-level classes continued to be overseen by a committee of the state legislature. As enrollment increased, land for a new building was purchased. In 1925, prior to completion of the new building, the Junior College of Augusta was established. In 1957, the junior college separated from the academy and moved to its present location on Walton Way.

In 1958, the college became a part of the University System of Georgia and its name was formally changed to Augusta College. It remained a two-year college until 1963, when it attained four-year status. A second campus was added on Wrightsboro Road, which now houses athletics, kinesiology & health science, a golf house, and 18-hole golf course.

In 1996, Augusta College was renamed Augusta State University, along with name changes mandated for most of the rest of the university system.

On June 30, 2012, William A. Bloodworth Jr. retired as president of Augusta State University and was replaced the next day by interim president Shirley Strum Kenny who occupied the office until August 10, 2012, when the office was abolished upon the university's merger.

On August 10, 2012, the Board of Regents of the University System of Georgia approved the merger of the school by fall 2013 with nearby Georgia Health Sciences University. Ricardo Azziz took the helm of ASU in summer of 2012 in preparation for the oncoming consolidation. The board named the new university Georgia Regents University, which caused considerable local controversy. It also triggered a lawsuit for alleged trademark infringement by Regent University in Virginia, which was settled out of court in June 2013.

On September 15, 2015, Georgia Regents University voted and changed the name to "Augusta University". This change came from years of frustration from alumni and decreased fundraising brought in following the name change to GRU. "Augusta University" was one of the top choices during the original name change from Augusta State to GRU.

== Academics ==
Augusta State was organized into six undergraduate colleges: Katherine Reese Pamplin College of Arts, Humanities, and Social Sciences, James M. Hull College of Business, the College of Education, the College of Allied Health Sciences, the College of Science and Mathematics, and the College of Nursing. Students could earn associate, bachelor, master, and specialist degrees in over 100 programs of study, and the college also offered paralegal certificates and cooperative doctorates. There was an Honors Program as well as a Cooperative Education program in which students alternated between classroom enrollment and work experience in their field of study. Students also had opportunities for internships and study abroad programs.

The James M. Hull College of Business was featured by The Princeton Review in the 2008 edition of, "Best 290 Business Schools."

In May 2009 the university hosted the 25th annual National Science Olympiad tournament.

== Athletics ==
Augusta State's athletic programs competed at the Division II level in the Peach Belt Conference of the NCAA, except for the men's and women's golf programs, both of which were Division I Independents.

The Jaguars' men's golf team won its first national title in 2010, knocking off perennial power Oklahoma State in the championship match at The Honors Course in Ooltewah, Tennessee. They defended their title in 2011 at Oklahoma State's home course, Karsten Creek, defeating the top-ranked Cowboys in the national semifinals and then Georgia in the final round of match play to reclaim the championship. The Jaguars became the first men's golf team to win consecutive national titles since Houston in 1984–85. They won five Big South Conference championships: 1985, 1986, 1987, 1990, 1991 under coach Ernie Lanford.

Augusta State's men's basketball program reached the Division II Elite Eight in Springfield, MA three consecutive years from 2008 to 2010, advancing as far as the national title game in '08. Through the end of the 2010–2011 season, ASU had been nationally ranked for 65 consecutive weeks, the fifth-longest streak in the history of Division II basketball.

Augusta State's men's tennis program reached the NCAA Championships for the first time in Louisville, Kentucky, in 2012. The program made the Final Four in what was the most successful year in the tennis program of the Jaguars. Also, Bernardo Fernandes landed the National honors in singles.

Other athletic programs at ASU included women's basketball, baseball, softball, men's and women's cross country, men's and women's tennis and volleyball.

== Campus ==
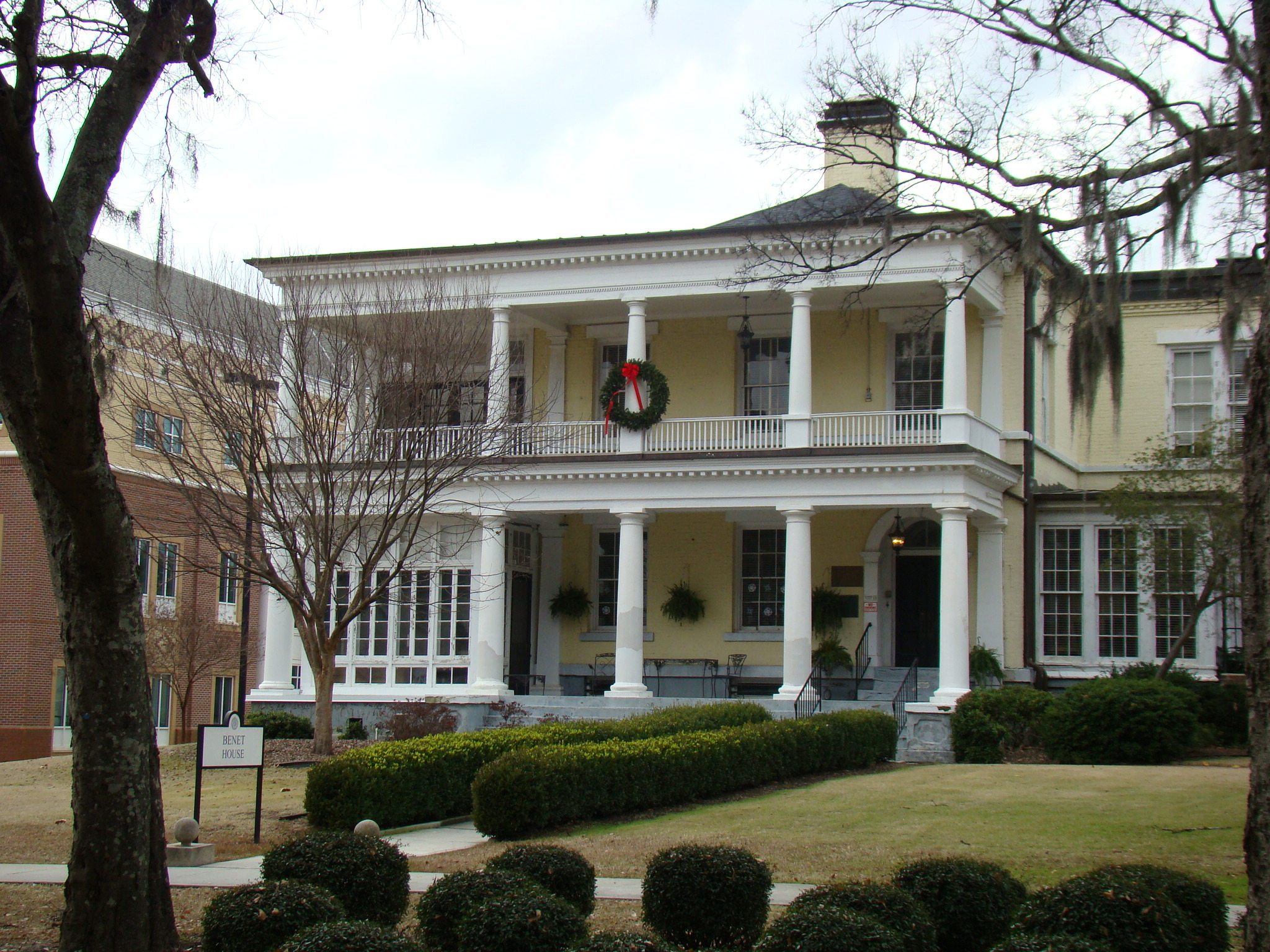
Benet House

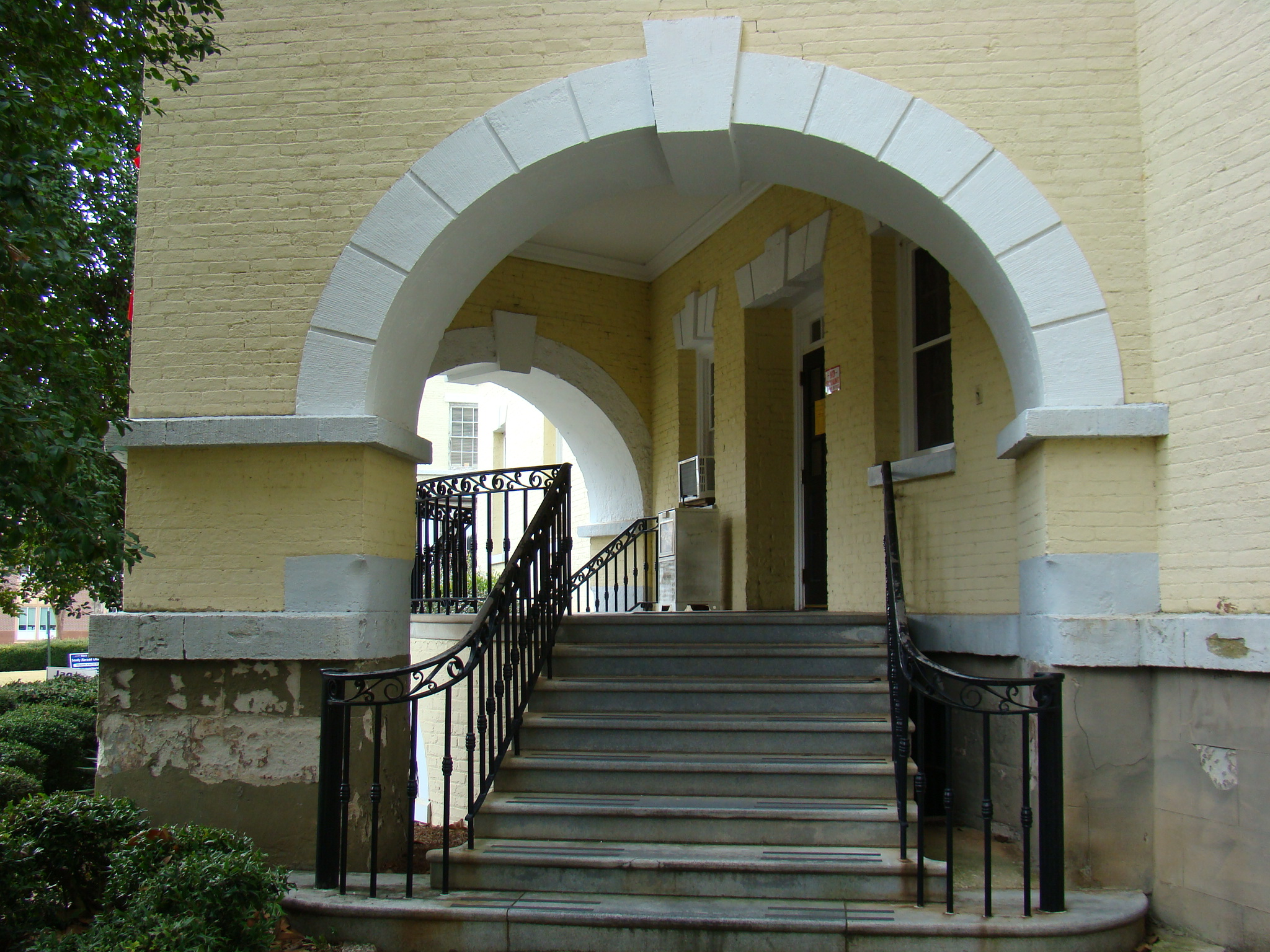
Payne Hall (former Augusta Arsenal building)

=== Reese Library ===
Reese Library, the information center of Augusta State, held a collection of more than 503,000 print and online books, plus an extensive collection of government publications, special collections and archives of materials relating to Georgia Regents and the greater Augusta area, over 500 print periodicals and more than 30,000 online journal titles. Thousands of journals, newspaper articles and books also were available in electronic full-text through GALILEO, an initiative of the University System of Georgia.

There were quiet study areas for individuals and groups, casual seating areas and study rooms, a family room for students with children, wireless connectivity to the Internet, photocopiers, microfilm copiers, laptops available to borrow, and more than 50 public computers providing access to online databases and full-text information.

GIL, the library's computerized catalog, provided access to information about library materials and other university system libraries. GALILEO, a statewide computer system, provided a wealth of additional information resources including more than 200 journal and newspaper databases, some with full text. These and other electronic information resources were available in the library, on the campus computer network, and, in most cases from off-campus computers with a password. Materials from other libraries could be obtained through inter library loan via the University System of Georgia Universal Catalog's GIL Express for books and via ILLIAD for books and journal articles, with the option of having journal articles delivered directly to campus email accounts.

The building is named for Dr. and Mrs. John T. Reese, parents of alumna Katherine Reese Pamplin. The three-story 80,000-square-foot (7,400 m^{2}) library has a seating capacity of just over 500. The library, now part of Georgia Regents University, is open 85.5 hours a week when classes are in session, with breaks in the academic schedule.

=== Other buildings ===
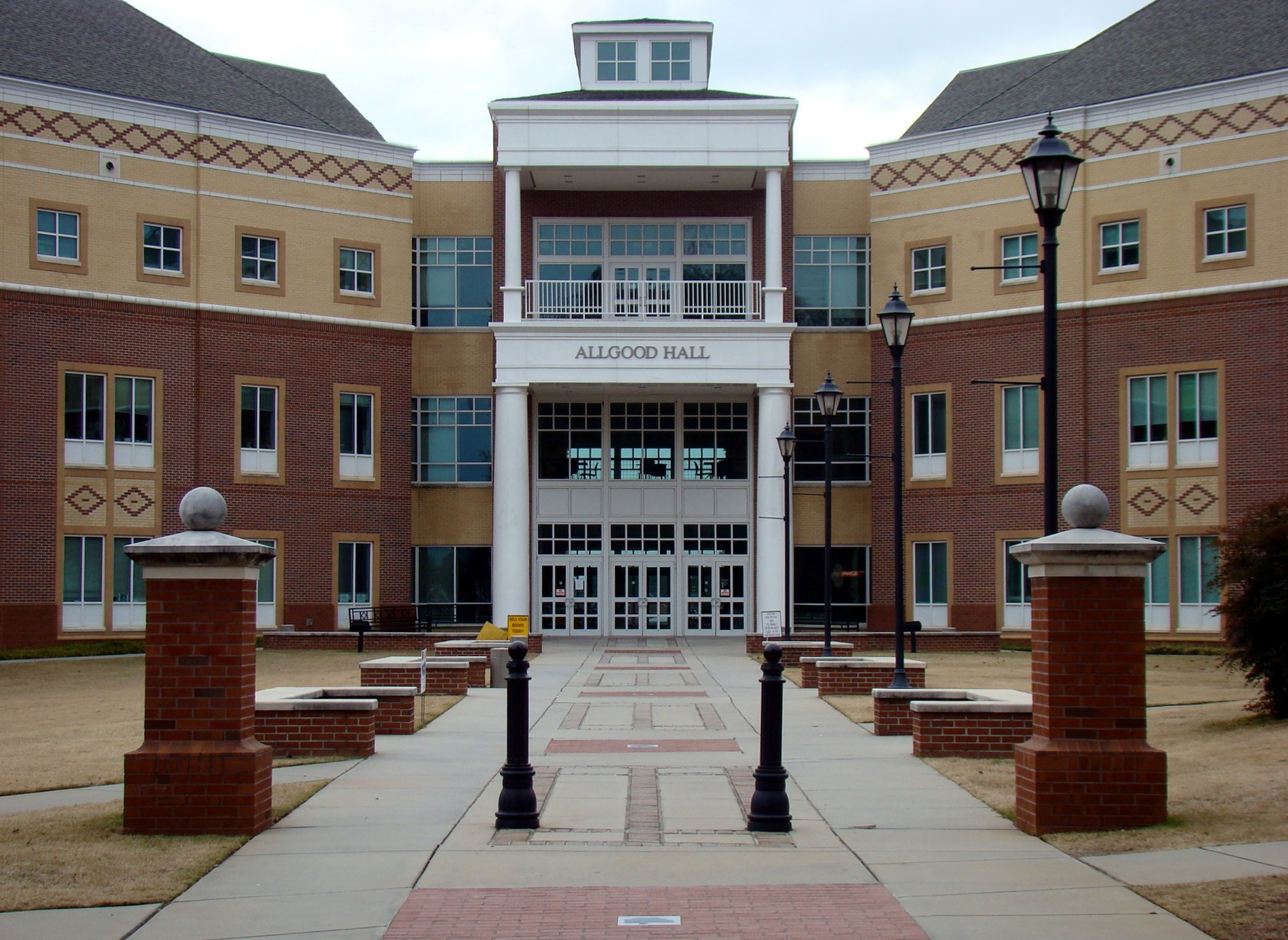
Allgood Hall

The early 21st century saw substantial development of the campus, with about $100 million worth of new construction. Some of the new buildings included the Science Building (completed in 1997), Allgood Hall (2002), University Hall (2004), the Jaguar Student Activities Center (commonly known as "The JSAC"; 2006), and the D. Douglas Bernard Jr. Amphitheatre (2008). Other existing structures on campus are Washington Hall, named for Justine Wilkinson Washington and Isaiah E. Washington, which houses the art department and gallery as well as bookstore and some business offices, the fine arts building, the Maxwell Theatre, and Galloway Hall, which houses Military Science and Continuing Education. Historic Arsenal Buildings (Rains, Benet, Payne, and Fanning) house administrative offices. Bellevue Hall houses the dean of students and academic affair. Boykin Wright Hall houses Counseling and the Career Center. ASU also has the Maxwell Alumni Houses, and a Guardhouse History Museum. The Christenberry Fieldhouse houses athletics and Kinesiology and Health Science.

=== Arsenal Oak ===
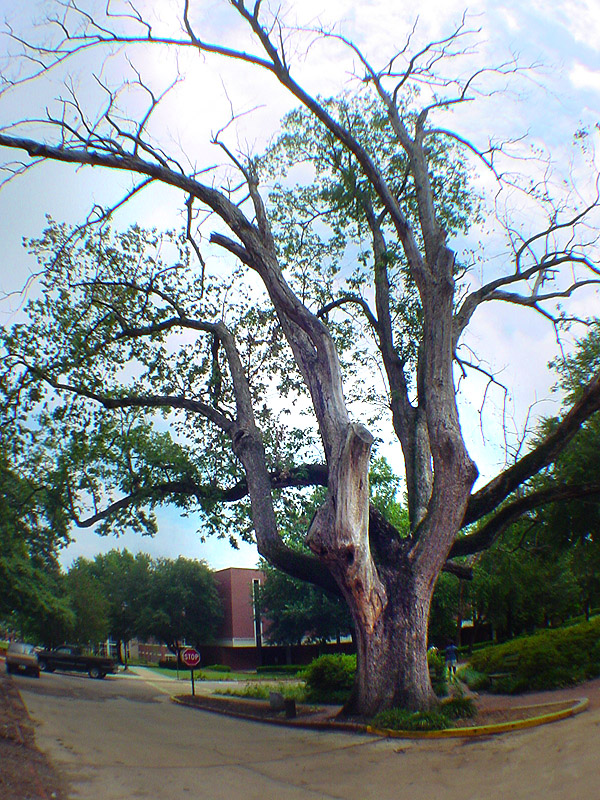
The Arsenal Oak in 2004

The Arsenal Oak was a White oak tree located at the center of the campus. The oak tree, which was estimated to be over 250 years old, formed the basis of the university's logo. It bore the name, Arsenal Oak, because the university's campus was once the Augusta Arsenal. It is said that the poet Stephen Vincent Benét (the author of "John Brown's Body" and "The Devil and Daniel Webster" sat beneath the branches of the Arsenal Oak as a boy as he wrote his poetry. His father Colonel J. Walker Benét was stationed at the arsenal. Despite a decade long effort to save the Arsenal Oak from wood borers and hypoxylon canker, the diseased tree was removed in July 2004.

In March 2016, a new Arsenal Oak was planted; the new tree was grown using acorns from the original Arsenal Oak.

== Notable alumni ==
Name	Class year	Notability	Reference(s)
Doug Barnard Jr.		United States congressman from Georgia	
Joelle Carter		Actress	
Chen Be-yue	1989	Justice of the Constitutional Court of the Republic of China	
Tommy Greer		Professional basketball player	
Greg Hire	2010	Professional basketball player	
Ben Madgen	2010	Professional basketball player	
Henrik Norlander		Professional golfer	
Patrick Reed	2011	Professional golfer	
Ben Purser		Professional basketball player	
Garret Siler	2009	Professional basketball player	
Ed Tarver	1981	United States Attorney	
Vaughn Taylor		Professional golfer	
Oliver Wilson		Professional golfer	

== See also ==
- Stephen Vincent Benet House
- Summerville (Augusta, Georgia)
