= James M. Hull College of Business =

Business school of Augusta University

- Type: Public
- Established: 1971
- Dean: Dr. Richard M. Franza
- Undergraduates: 968
- Postgraduates: 116
- Location: Augusta, Georgia, USA
- Website: www.augusta.edu/hull

The James M. Hull College of Business at Augusta University offers four undergraduate degrees, as well as a Master of Business Administration. It is located on the Summerville campus, with classes primarily located in Allgood Hall. It is accredited by The Association to Advance Collegiate Schools of Business (AACSB), and has been named one of the top business schools in the country by The Princeton Review multiple times.

== History ==
The school's beginnings can be traced to a Board of Regents decision to allow a degree in Business Administration to be awarded to Augusta College upon the school's successful transition to a four-year college in 1963. Eight years later, the college was allowed to offer its first MBA, and the School of Business Administration became official, earning a name change to the College of Business Administration in 1996 when Augusta College's name changed to Augusta State University.

In 2006, James Hull, owner of one of the United States’ largest shopping mall developers, made a donation of $2 million to the university specifically earmarked for the College of Business. In response, school officials renamed the college to its current name to honor the investment, which was the largest in then-Augusta State University's history.

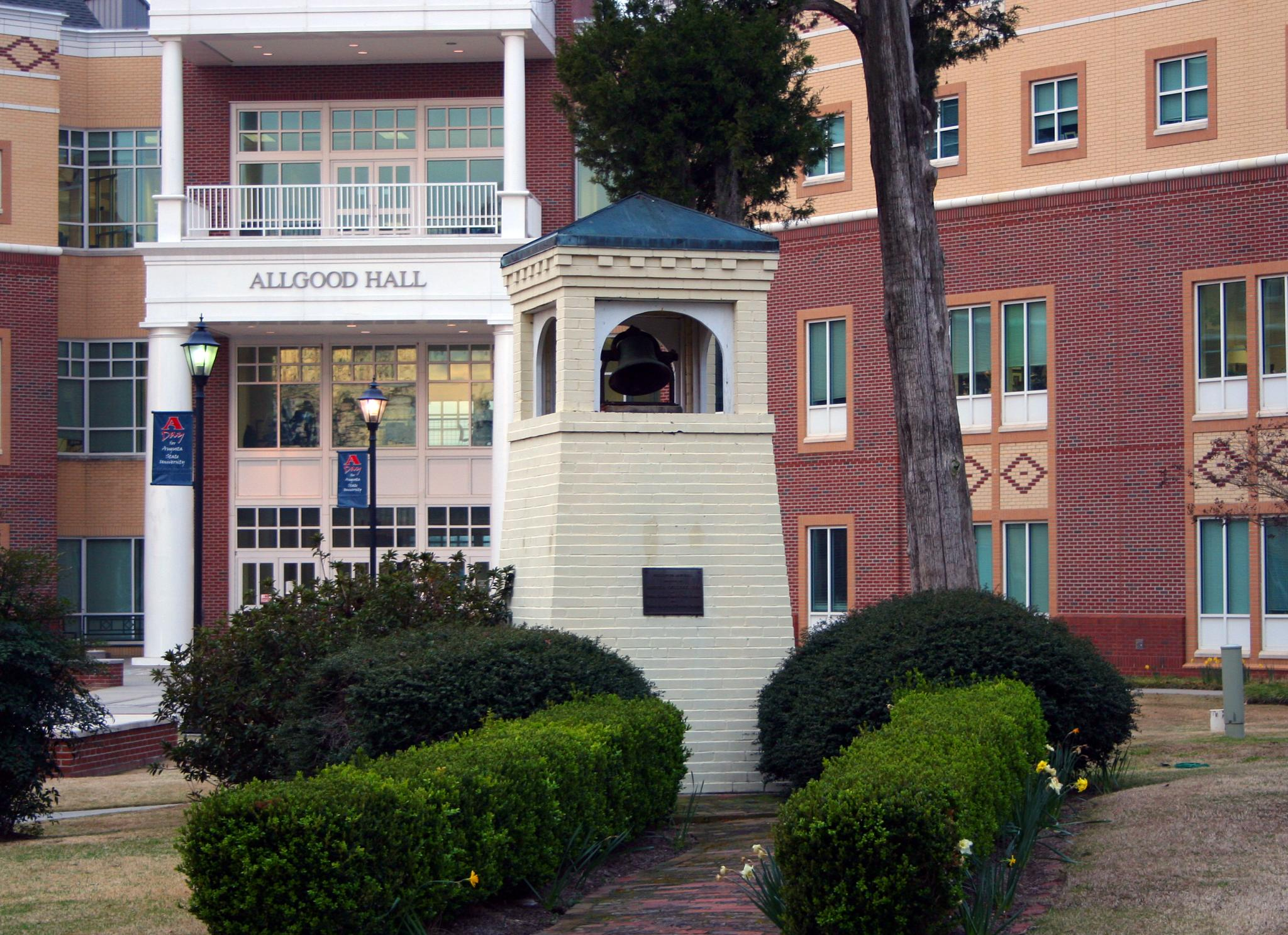
The Hull College of Business is primarily located in Allgood Hall on the Summerville campus.

== Academics ==
The Hull College of Business offers four undergraduate degrees, an MBA, and one certificate program.

=== Degrees ===
- B.A. of Business Administration, Accounting
- B.A. of Business Administration, Finance
- B.A. of Business Administration, Concentration in Digital Marketing
- B.A. of Business Administration, Concentration in Healthcare Management
- MBA, The Hull MBA

=== Minors ===
- Accounting
- Business Administration
- Economics

=== Certificates ===
- Hospitality Administration Certificate
