= Wellstar MCG Health Medical Center =

Coordinates: 33°28′14.3″N 81°59′23.7″W

- Wellstar Health System

Geography
- Location: 1120 15th St, Augusta, Georgia, United States

Organization
- Affiliated university: Augusta University, Medical College of Georgia

Services
- Emergency department: Level I Adult Trauma Center / Level II Pediatric Trauma Center
- Beds: 478; 154 (Children's Hospital of Georgia)

Helipads
- Helipad: Yes

History
- Founded: 1956

Links
- Website: https://www.wellstar.org/locations/hospital/mcg-health-medical-center
- Lists: Hospitals in Georgia

Wellstar MCG Health Medical Center formerly known as Augusta University Medical Center is an academic hospital that manages the clinical operations associated with Augusta University. It is a health care network that offers primary, specialty and sub-specialty care in the Augusta, Georgia area and throughout the Southeastern United States.

On August 30, 2023 it was announced that its merger with Wellstar Health System had been completed.

== Facilities ==
Augusta University Health's facilities include:

- 478-bed medical center
- 154-bed children's hospital
- Medical office building with more than 80 outpatient practice sites
- 13-county regional Level 1 trauma center at the Critical Care Center
- Cancer center, including a freestanding outpatient clinic, radiation oncology building and the M. Bert Storey Cancer Research Building
- Satellite locations, including Augusta University Medical Associates at West Wheeler, Augusta University Medical Associates at Lake Oconee, Roosevelt Warm Springs and various freestanding clinics for specialty and subspecialty care
- Augusta University Health also partners with rural hospitals across Georgia to improve access to advanced health care options.

=== Awards ===
The hospital has received several awards.

The Breast Health Center was named Augusta's only Breast Imaging Center of Excellence by the American College of Radiology in 2011.

The Kidney Transplant Excellence Award from Healthgrades was awarded in 2009 and 2010. GRMC was one of 10 kidney transplant programs to receive the distinction.

=== Children's Hospital of Georgia ===
The Children's Hospital of Georgia (CHOG) is a 154-bed academic children's hospital, and is the only children's hospital in the Augusta area. CHOG provides the highest level of neonatal intensive care and pediatric intensive care available as defined by the American Academy of Pediatrics. It is staffed by a team of pediatric specialists who deliver inpatient and outpatient care for everything from common childhood illnesses to life-threatening conditions like heart and neurological conditions and cancer.

The facility opened in 1998 as part of the Medical College of Georgia's 10 year master-plan expansion as the MCGHealth Children's Medical Center, and was renamed in 2013. The hospital is among the largest pediatric facilities in the United States.

CHOG has an award-winning Extracorporeal Membrane Oxygenation (ECMO) program, which is considered a pioneer in this area, having started the first program in the Southeast in 1985, and having been designated a Center of Excellence in 2012.

=== Merger with Wellstar ===
In December 2022, it was announced the Augusta University Health would proceed with a merger with the Atlanta-based Wellstar Health System - the goal being to provide more ample options for students at the Medical College of Georgia to study around the state of Georgia. Following approval by the University System of Georgia's Board of Regents in April 2023, the system would be renamed Wellstar MCG Health when the merger is completed at a later date.

On August 30, 2023 it was announced that the merger was completed.

As of November, 2024 the name of the hospital is Wellstar MCG Health Medical Center.

== Quality program ==
In 1993, Augusta University Medical Center implemented a program in which patients and family members serve as advisers to the hospital in order to provide input that can lead to general quality improvement efforts.

== See also ==
- Medical District (Augusta, Georgia)
