= Timeline of Augusta, Georgia =

The following is a timeline of the history of the city of Augusta, Georgia, USA.

== 18th century ==
- 1740 - Savannah-Augusta "highway" constructed.
- 1750 - St. Paul's Church established.
- 1779 - January 29: Augusta taken by British forces.
- 1780 - Georgia state capital relocated to Augusta.
- 1781
  - April 16: Siege of Augusta by American forces begins.
  - May: British-occupied Fort Grierson taken by American forces.
- 1785 - Academy of Richmond County opens.
- 1789
  - Town of Augusta incorporated.
  - The Augusta Chronicle newspaper in publication.
- 1790
  - "Negro" Baptist Church established.
  - Government House built.
- 1791
  - May: U.S. president George Washington visits Augusta.
  - Bridge built across Savannah River.
- 1792 - John Milton becomes mayor.
- 1795 - Meadow Garden built as summer house of George Walton, youngest signer of the U.S. Declaration of Independence.

== 19th century ==
- 1802 - Wray's drug store in business.
- 1805 - Methodist church built (approximate date).
- 1808 - Library Company and Thespian Society founded.
- 1810 - Bank of Augusta established.
- 1812 - First Presbyterian Church built.
- 1815 - Catholic church built (approximate date).
- 1817 - City of Augusta incorporated.
- 1818 - Magnolia Cemetery in use.
- 1819 - Augusta Arsenal built.
- 1820 - First Baptist Church built.
- 1821
  - Town of Hamburg established in South Carolina across the river from Augusta.
  - Free School Society (charity) formed.
- 1822 - Medical Society incorporated.
- 1824 - City Hall built.
- 1825 - Lafayette visits Augusta.
- 1827 - Library Society founded.
- 1828
  - Medical Academy of Georgia founded.
  - Unitarian church built.
- 1829 - April 3: Fire.
- 1830 - Population: 6,710.
- 1833 - Charleston-Augusta railway begins operating.
- 1836 - Broad Street fire.
- 1837
  - Georgia Railroad (Augusta-Berzelia) begins operating.
  - Augusta Chronicle & Sentinel newspaper begins publication.
- 1840 - Yellow fever epidemic.
- 1845 - Southern Baptist Convention founded at a meeting in Augusta.
- 1847 - Augusta Canal built.
- 1848
  - Young Men's Library Association formed.
  - Signers Monument dedicated.
- 1850 - Population: 9,448.
- 1854
  - Augusta and Savannah Railroad begins operating.
  - Yellow fever epidemic.
- 1858 - Fruitland Nurseries in business.
- 1860 - Population: 12,493.
- 1861 - January 24: U.S. arsenal occupied by Confederate forces of Georgia state.
- 1862
  - Confederate Powderworks begins operating.
  - St. Patrick's Church built.
- 1863 - April: Photo-illustrated wanted poster introduced.
- 1864 - January: Flood.
- 1865
  - U.S. Army takes city.
  - Colored American newspaper begins publication.
- 1866 - State Freedmen's Conventions held in Augusta.
- 1867 - Augusta Institute (later Morehouse College) established.
- 1869
  - "Iron works factory" in business.
  - Synagogue built.
- 1870 - Cotton States Mechanics and Agricultural Fair held in Augusta.
- 1877 - Augusta Evening News begins publication.
- 1878 - Augusta Confederate Monument dedicated.
- 1879 - Augusta Institute relocated to Atlanta from Augusta.
- 1880 - Population: 21,891.
- 1882 - Paine Institute established.
- 1886 - Haines Normal and Industrial Institute founded.
- 1890 - Augusta Herald newspaper begins publication.
- 1892 - Negro Press Association of Georgia formed during meeting in Augusta.
- 1894 - Buffalo kindergarten opens.

== 20th century ==
- 1900 - Population: 39,441.
- 1908 - Flood.
- 1909 - Church of the Immaculate Conception established.
- 1910 - Springfield Baptist Church built.
- 1912
  - Flood.
  - "Street railway strike" occurs.
  - Summerville becomes part of Augusta.
- 1916
  - Fire.
  - Levee and United States Post Office and Courthouse built.
- 1917 - U.S. military Camp Gordon and Camp Hancock established near Augusta.
- 1918 - Imperial Theatre opens.
- 1919 - City's "first paved four-lane highway" opens.
- 1926 - Junior College of Augusta established.
- 1933 - Augusta Museum and Augusta National Golf Club established.
- 1934
  - C.T. Walker Traditional Magnet School is established.
  - WRDW radio begins broadcasting.
- 1935 - City bicentennial.
- 1937 - August: Blood drive organized.
- 1940 - Augusta Drive-In cinema in business.
- 1945 - September 15: Future opera star Jessye Norman born in Augusta.
- 1948 - City manager form of government adopted.
- 1949 - Lucy Craft Laney High School established.
- 1950 - Bush Field begins operating as a civilian airport.
- 1953 - WJBF-TV (television) begins broadcasting.
- 1954 - WRDW-TV (television) begins broadcasting.
- 1961 - Augusta Area Vocational-Technical School founded.
- 1970 - May 11–13: Racial unrest.
- 1978 - Augusta Mall in business.
- 1996 - "City of Augusta consolidated with Richmond County to form Augusta-Richmond County."
- 1997 - April 24: African-American golfer Tiger Woods, age 21, wins 1997 Masters Tournament.

== 21st century ==
- 2005 - John Barrow becomes U.S. representative for Georgia's 12th congressional district.
- 2010 - Population: 195,844.
- 2014 - Ice storm.
- 2015
  - Hardie Davis becomes mayor.
  - Rick W. Allen becomes U.S. representative for Georgia's 12th congressional district.

== See also ==
- History of Augusta, Georgia
- List of mayors of Augusta, Georgia
- National Register of Historic Places listings in Richmond County, Georgia
- Timelines of other cities in Georgia: Athens, Atlanta, Columbus, Macon, Savannah

== Bibliography ==
- Augusta Directory. Augusta, Ga.: Browne & McCaffery. 1841.
- John P. Campbell, ed. (1854). "Georgia: Richland County". Southern Business Directory. Charleston, SC: Press of Walker & James.
- Directory for the City of Augusta. R.A. Watkins. 1859 – via HathiTrust.
- Adiel Sherwood (1860), "Richmond County: Augusta", Gazetteer of Georgia (4th ed.), Macon: S. Boykin
- George E. Waring, Jr.; U.S. Department of the Interior, Census Office (1887), "Georgia: Augusta", Report on the Social Statistics of Cities: Southern and the Western States, Washington DC: Government Printing Office, pp. 163–168
- "Augusta". Western and Southern States. Appletons' General Guide to the United States and Canada. New York: D. Appleton & Co. 1889.
- Charles C. Jones; Salem Dutcher (1890). Memorial History of Augusta, Georgia. D. Mason.
- F.H. Richardson (1905). "Augusta, Ga.". Richardson's Southern Guide. Chicago: Monarch Book Company – via Internet Archive.
- "Augusta", United States (4th ed.), Leipzig: K. Baedeker, 1909, OCLC 02338437
- "Augusta (Georgia)" . Encyclopædia Britannica. Vol. 2 (11th ed.). 1910. pp. 904–905.
- Federal Writers' Project (1938). Augusta. American Guide Series. OCLC 1411325.
- Federal Writers' Project (1940), "Augusta", Georgia: a Guide to Its Towns and Countryside, American Guide Series, Athens: University of Georgia Press, pp. 192–213, ISBN 9781603540100 – via Google Books
- Edward J. Cashin; Glenn T. Eskew, eds. (2001). Paternalism in a Southern City: Race, Religion, and Gender in Augusta, Georgia. University of Georgia Press. ISBN 978-0-8203-2257-5.
- Sean Joiner; Gerald Smith (2004). Augusta. Black America. Arcadia Publishing. ISBN 978-1-4396-1270-5.
- Paul T. Hellmann (2005). "Georgia: Augusta". Historical Gazetteer of the United States. Taylor & Francis. pp. 219–220. ISBN 1-135-94859-3.
