= History of Augusta, Georgia =

History of the city in Richmond County, Georgia, United States

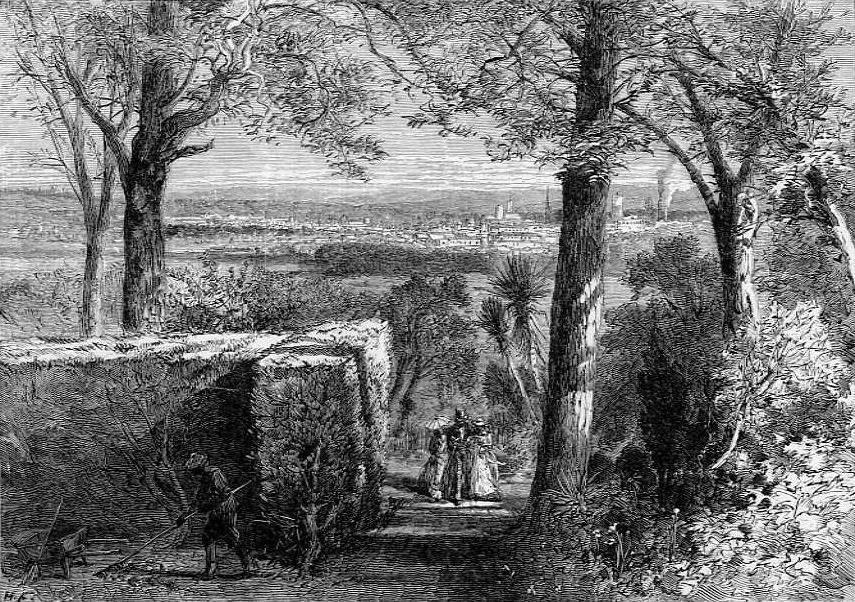
View of Augusta, from Summerville, 1872, by Harry Fenn; Augusta annexed Summerville in 1912

Augusta, Georgia was founded in 1736 as part of the British colony of Georgia, under the supervision of colony founder James Oglethorpe. It was the colony's second established town, after Savannah. Today, Augusta is the second-largest city in Georgia, and the largest city of the Central Savannah River Area.

== Colonial Augusta ==
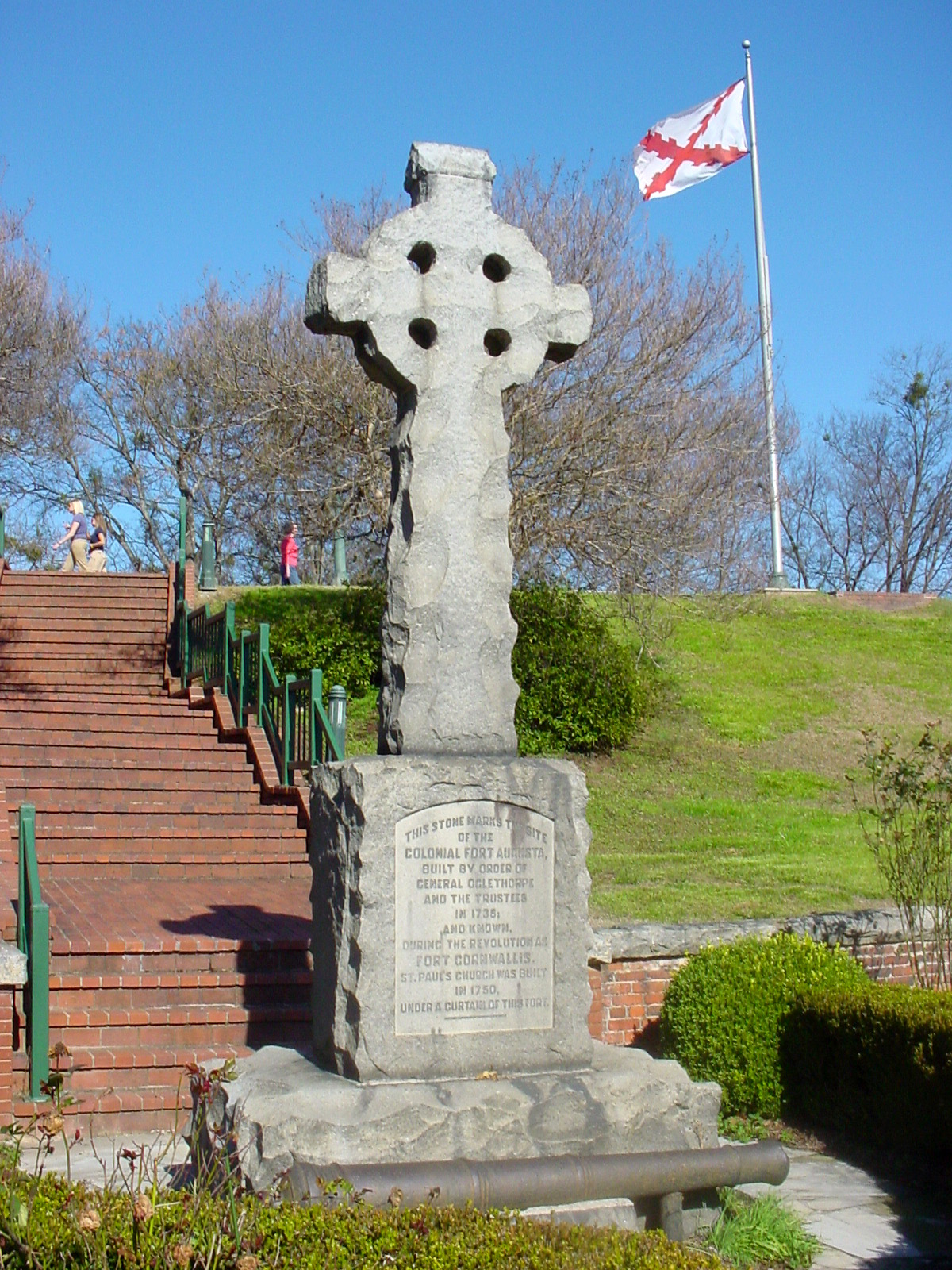
Celtic cross behind Saint Paul's Church, commemorating the site of Fort Augusta

Augusta, Georgia was first used by Native Americans as a place to cross the Savannah River because of Augusta's location on the Fall Line.

In 1736, two years after James Oglethorpe founded Savannah, he sent a detachment of troops on a journey up the Savannah River. He gave them an order to build at the head of the navigable part of the river. The job fell into the hands of Noble Jones, who created the settlement to provide a first line of defense against the Spanish and the French. Oglethorpe then named the town Augusta, in honor of Princess Augusta, wife of Frederick, Prince of Wales.

The town was laid out on the flat slopes of the Savannah River, just east of the sand hills that would come to be known as Summerville. The townspeople got along peacefully most of the time with the surrounding tribes of Chickasaw, Creek, Yuchi and Shawnee Indians. The Shawnees in the region were known as the Savano Indians. The name of the Savannah River is an anglicization of their tribal name.

In 1739, construction began on a road to connect Augusta to Savannah. That made it possible for people to reach Augusta by horse, rather than by boat, and more people began to migrate inland to Augusta. Later, in 1750, Augusta's first church, Saint Paul's, was built near Fort Augusta. It became the leader of the local parish.

The town's relationship with the neighboring Cherokee, who traded with Augusta, was not as good as its relationships with other tribes. During the Anglo-Cherokee War, their war parties came close to Augusta and were repulsed by the Creek.

While slavery was originally banned in the colony by Oglethorpe, it soon became an integral part of Georgia's history. Under Georgia's new constitution, a new political structure was laid out in 1777; Augusta's parish government was replaced by a county government, Richmond County, named after the Duke of Richmond.

== American Revolution to the Civil War ==
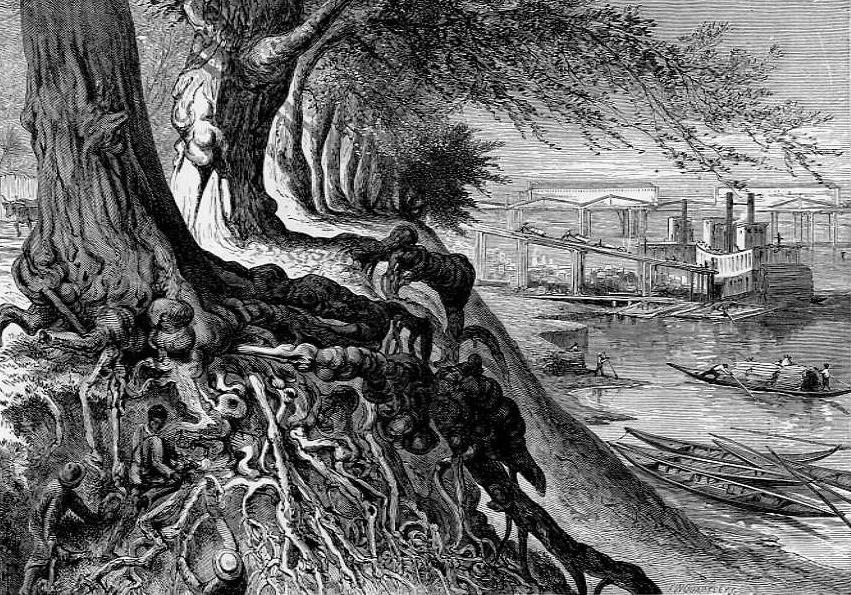
The Savannah, at Augusta, 1872

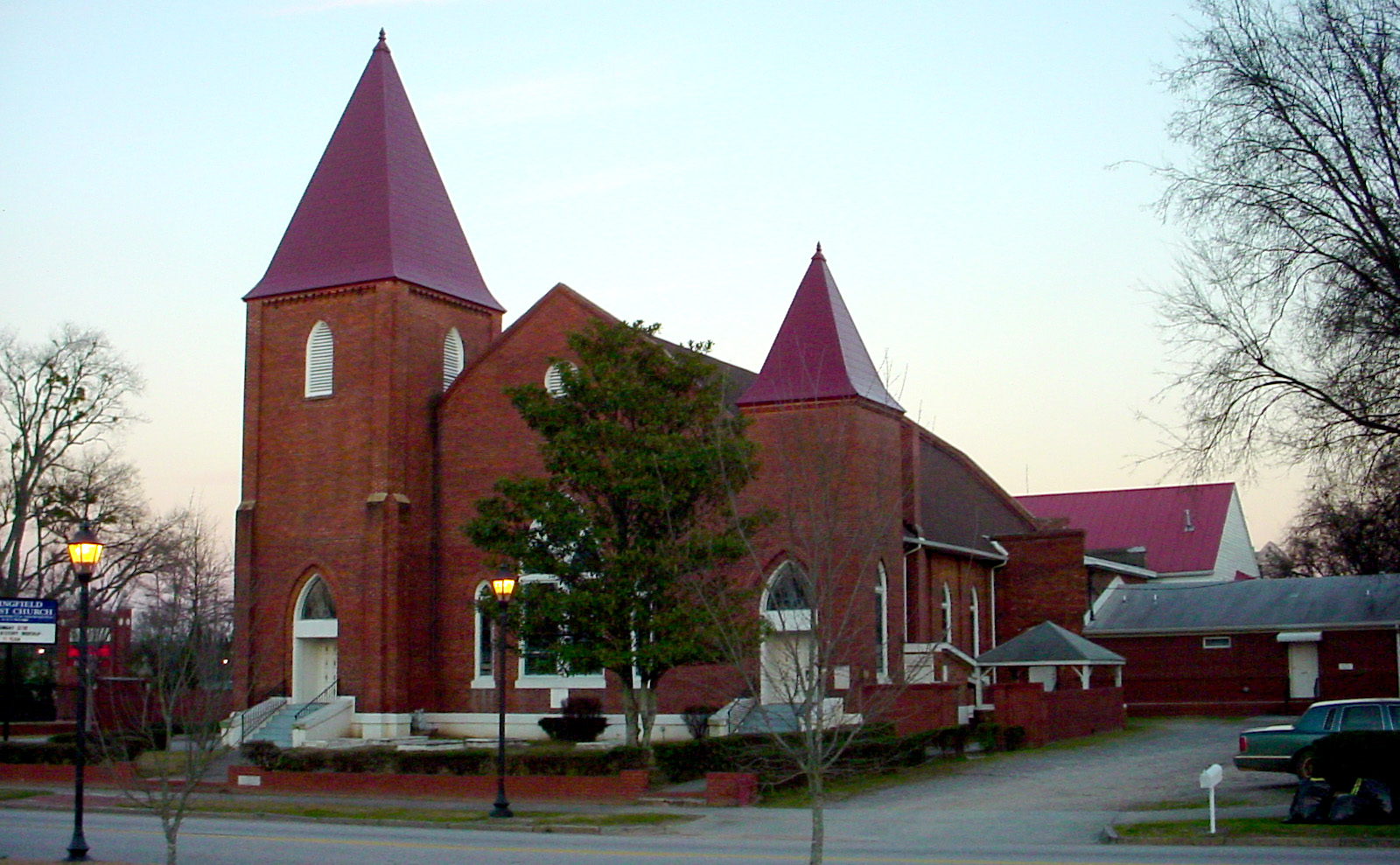
Springfield Baptist Church, 1867-1879 site of the Augusta Institute. In 1879 the Institute moved to Atlanta, and in 1913 became known as Morehouse College.

During the American Revolution, Savannah fell to the British. This left Augusta as the new state capital and a new prime target of the British. By January 31, 1779, Augusta was captured by Lt. Col. Archibald Campbell. But Campbell soon withdrew, as American troops were gathering on the opposite shore of the Savannah River. Augusta again became the state capital, but not for long. Augusta fell into British hands once more before the end of the war.

From then until the American Civil War, with the establishment of the Augusta Canal, Augusta became a leader in the production of textiles, gunpowder, and paper. The Georgia Railroad was built by local contractors Fannin, Grant & Co in 1845, giving Augusta a rail link to Atlanta. The railroad connected to the Tennessee River at Chattanooga, Tennessee, thus providing access from inland Georgia to the Mississippi River. The cost-savings of this link from the middle of the country to the Atlantic Ocean via the Savannah River increased trade considerably.

In 1845, Augusta was the location of the founding of the Southern Baptist Convention, today one of the largest Protestant denominations in the country. Due to increasing tensions between northern and southern Baptists on the subject of slavery in the 1840s, southern Baptists decided to withdraw formally from the national Baptist organizations. They met at the First Baptist Church of Augusta in May 1845 and formed the new convention, naming it the Southern Baptist Convention.

By 1860 Augusta had a population of 12,493; it was then one of 102 U.S. cities to have a population of over 10,000, and was the second largest city in Georgia.

== Civil War to World War II ==
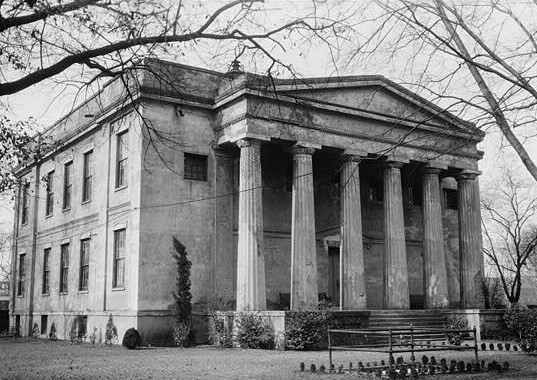
Old Medical College

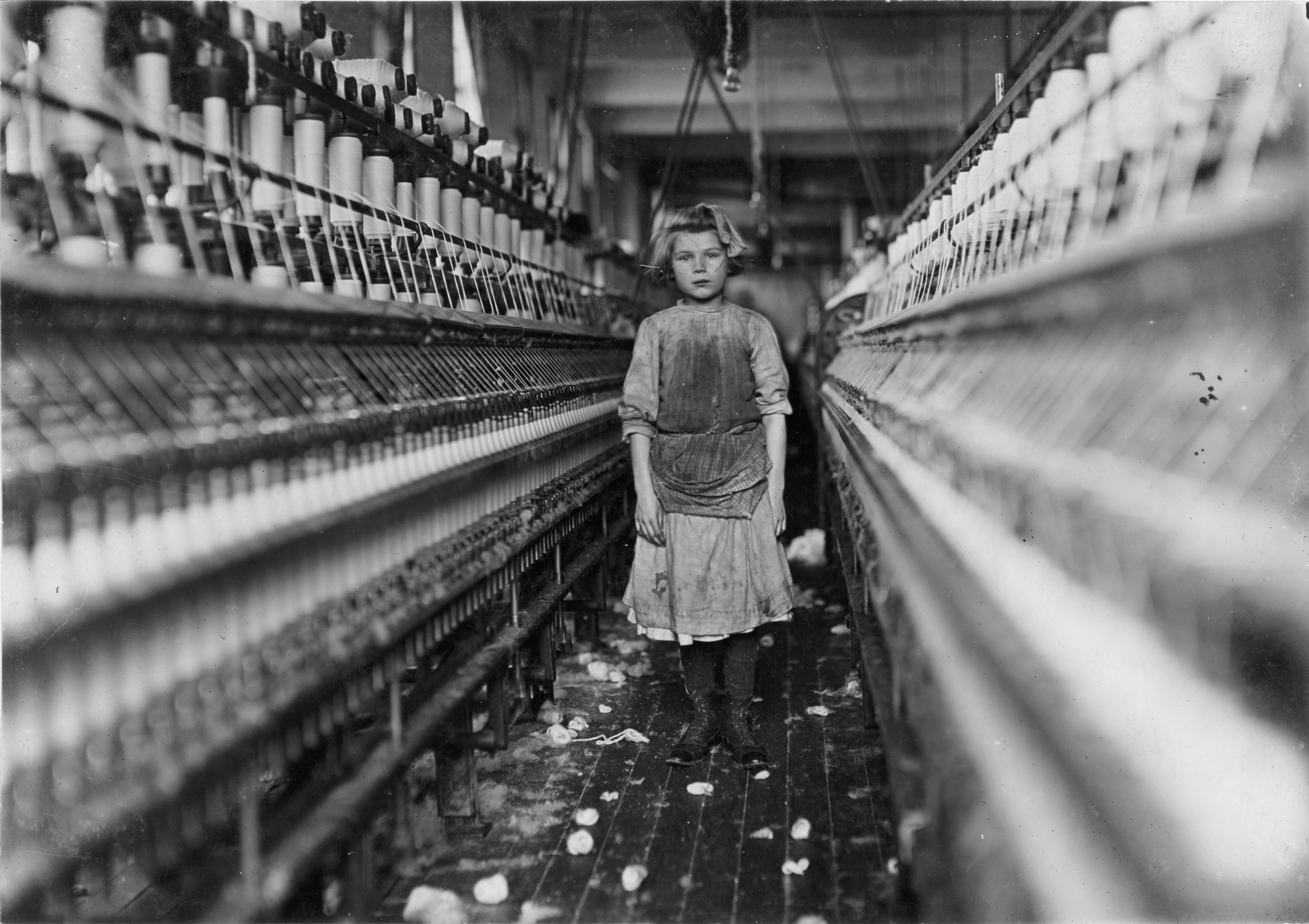
Child worker at Globe Cotton Mill in Augusta, 1909, by Lewis W. Hine

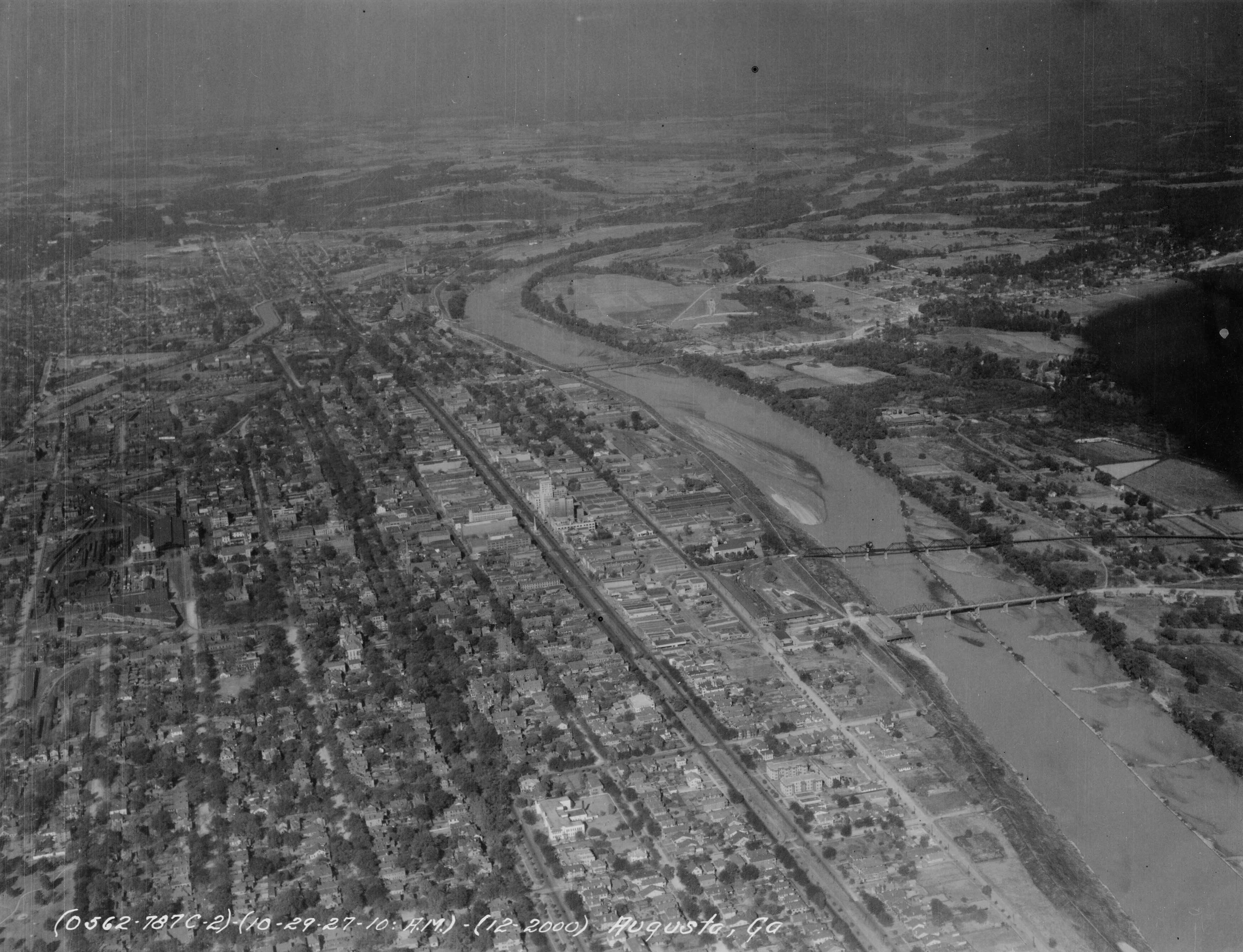
View of Augusta, 1927

Originally, Augustans welcomed the idea of the Civil War. The new Confederate Powderworks were the only permanent structures constructed and completed by the Confederacy. Over 2000 Augustans went away to fight in the war, but war did not set into the minds of Augustans until the summer of 1863 when Confederate sympathizers came crowding into Augusta, leading to shortages in housing and provisions. Next came the threatening nearness of General Sherman's advancing army, causing panic in the streets of the once-quiet town. However, the city was never burned to the ground. After the War, Augusta and Georgia were both under martial law during the period known as Reconstruction. During this time, African American civil rights were expanded. Following the end of Reconstruction, the European American majority population of Georgia and other Southern U.S. states enacted Jim Crow laws to limit the rights of African Americans. These restrictions would not be lifted until the Civil Rights Movement of the mid-20th century.

Specifically, the Richmond County School System refused to educate African American students at all. In 1899, a group of parents took their objections in a class actions suit the Supreme Court in Cumming v. Richmond County Board of Education. The court ruled that the use of state funds was not within federal purview under the Fourteenth Amendment. This ruling was overturned in Brown v. Board of Education.

In 1828, the Georgia General Assembly granted a formal charter for the Medical Academy of Georgia, and the school began training physicians in two borrowed rooms of the City Hospital. By 1873, an affiliation was made with the University of Georgia, and the school became the Medical Department of the University. The school would become the Medical College of Georgia in 1956. In 1914, University Hospital was founded near the Medical College, forming the anchor of a heavily developed medical sector in the city.

Unlike most Southern cities, Postbellum life for Augusta was very prosperous. By the beginning of the 20th century, Augusta had become one of the largest inland cotton markets in the world. A new military cantonment, named Camp Hancock, opened nearby during World War I. In 1916 a large fire destroyed over 700 buildings in the city including many of its finest residences.

In 1927, Owen Robertson Cheatham founded the lumber company Georgia Pacific in Augusta, before it moved to Portland, Oregon, and later to Atlanta.

Prior to World War II, the U.S. Army constructed a new fort in Richmond County, Camp Gordon, which was finished a few days after the attack on Pearl Harbor. Many new soldiers were brought to this camp to train to go off to war. Within the few months after WWII, many of the GIs at Camp Gordon had been sent back home, and the importance of the army in the community seemed to almost come to an end. Music legend James Brown, then a teenager, often performed for the soldiers. Brown grew up in Augusta during the 1930s and 1940s (he lived with his aunt, who was the madam of a house of prostitution on Twiggs St.).

== World War II to consolidation ==
=== Augusta's golden age ===
In 1948, new life came to the city when the U.S. Army moved the Signal Training Center and Military Police School to Camp Gordon. Later, in November 1948, the Clarks Hill Reservoir was created by a newly constructed dam, which provided the city with a supply of hydroelectric power. In 1950, plans were announced to build the Savannah River Plant nearby, which boosted the city's population about 50,000. Augusta moved into the second half of the 20th century on the threshold of becoming an urban industrial center in the South. E-Z-GO and Club Car, the two largest golf car manufacturers in the world, are centered in Augusta, and the Norfolk Southern and CSX run through the middle of downtown Augusta. The city is also a large private company hot-spot, home to the Georgia Bank & Trust and CareSouth.

=== The Civil Rights Movement and backlash ===
The Civil Rights Movement shaped Augusta as it did the rest of the United States. In 1961, soul musician Ray Charles canceled a scheduled performance at the Bell Auditorium when he learned that the Black attendees would be segregated from the whites and forced to sit in the balcony. A few days after the Kent State shootings and Jackson State killings in May 1970, Black 16-year-old Charles Oakman was tortured and beaten to death in a county jail. White officials refused to provide answers, prompting Black citizens to demonstrate for racial justice at the county jail. White officials responded to property damage with physical violence, and police shot at least 60 people and killed six participating in the collective rebellion.

Today, African Americans constitute 53.6 percent (2006 estimate) of the population of Augusta-Richmond County. Slavery and Jim Crow continue to shape present inequities, and race relations remain contentious in city politics.

=== Urban decline ===
Beginning in the late 1970s, businesses started leaving downtown Augusta for both Regency Mall and Augusta Mall, which started a trend of urban abandonment and decay. To counter this trend, city politicians and business leaders promoted revitalizing Augusta's hidden riverfront (obscured by a levee) into Riverwalk Augusta, with parks, an amphitheater, hotels, museums, and art galleries. The first segment of Riverwalk Augusta was opened in the late 1980s and later expanded in the early 1990s. However, the renaissance of the riverfront did not appear to be spilling over into Augusta's main street, Broad Street, as more businesses were leaving and more storefronts boarded up. Broad Street is the second widest Broad street in America.

=== Revitalization ===
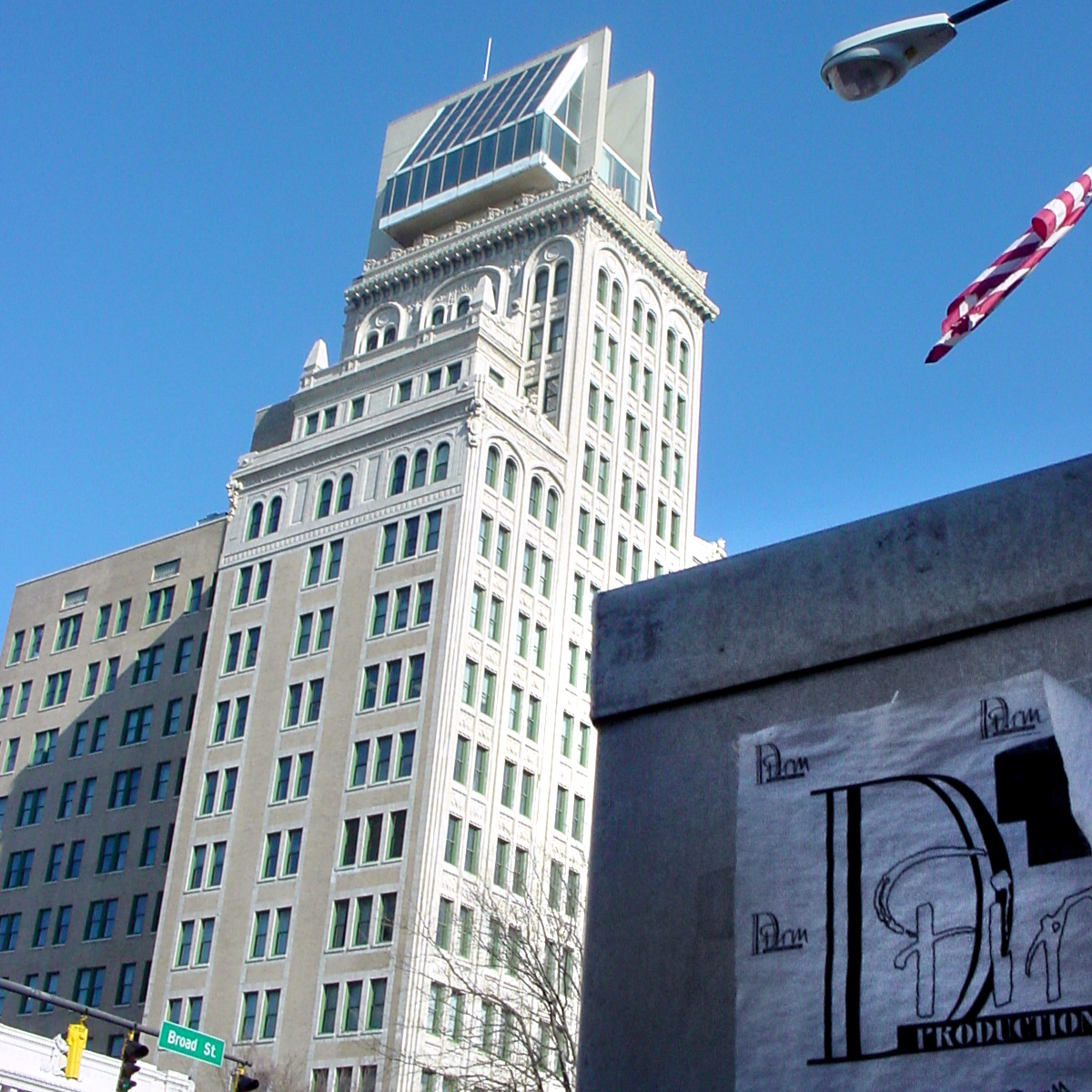
The Lamar Building built in 1918 will be the future site of high-end apartments in Downtown Augusta.

In 1995, members of the art community and downtown boosters started a monthly event called First Friday. It was a night festival whose aim was to bring crowds back to downtown. It featured local bands, street performers, and art galleries with extended evening hours. Since 1995, more businesses have returned to downtown, including many new restaurants and bars. A block of upper Broad Street has been named Artists' Row and is home to several locally owned art galleries. First Friday still continues today in addition to many revitalization efforts to downtown. Downtown Augusta has become an epicenter of new growth in recent years though with new focuses on revitalizing historic structures in Downtown to include the former First Baptist Church on Greene Street as well as the Miller Theater, the Lamar Building, and King Mill - all located on Broad Street - which are continuing to be revitalized by developers. Investments have also been made into public art which includes the establishment of the Augusta Sculpture Trail in Downtown Augusta as well as new featured murals showing Augusta native James Brown and some of his notable works. Other new developments have been proposed for new construction in future years to include new mixed use developments along Telfair Street, Greene Street, James Brown Boulevard, and Ellis Street as well as a new hotel on Broad Street and the conversion of the Fifth Street Bridge into a new pedestrian bridge over the Savannah River.

== 1996 consolidation ==
In 1995, citizens of the city of Augusta and Richmond County voted to merge governments. Citizens of Hephzibah, Georgia and Blythe, Georgia decided to remain separate. The consolidation took effect January 1, 1996 with the city of Augusta surrendering its city charter and merging operations with Richmond County.

== 1996 to present ==
The Augusta Museum of History highlights Augusta's history and famous natives and Historic Augusta has helped preserve architecturally important sites throughout the city.

=== Cyber boom ===
In 2013, the U.S. Army announced the relocation of the U.S. Army Cyber Command from its Fort Meade in Maryland to Fort Gordon in Augusta. This announcement led to a cyber security economic boom in the Augusta metro region with many defense contractors and other private cyber security companies relocating their headquarters and their workforce to Augusta. A later announcement in 2017 by then Georgia Governor Nathan Deal of an investment of $100 million to construct a state of the art cyber training facility in Augusta on the site of the former Georgia Golf Hall of Fame and Botanical Gardens. This Georgia Cyber Center was completed the next year in 2018 and now provides office and collaborative spaces for cyber-related companies such as Parsons and BAE Systems as well as is the home of the Augusta University and the Augusta Technical College cyber security and information technology programs and a new cyber crime lab for the Georgia Bureau of Investigations.

== See also ==
- Timeline of Augusta, Georgia
- List of mayors of Augusta, Georgia
- Arts and culture in Augusta, Georgia
- Province of Georgia (colonial Georgia)
- Category:History of Augusta, Georgia
