= Morris Museum of Art =

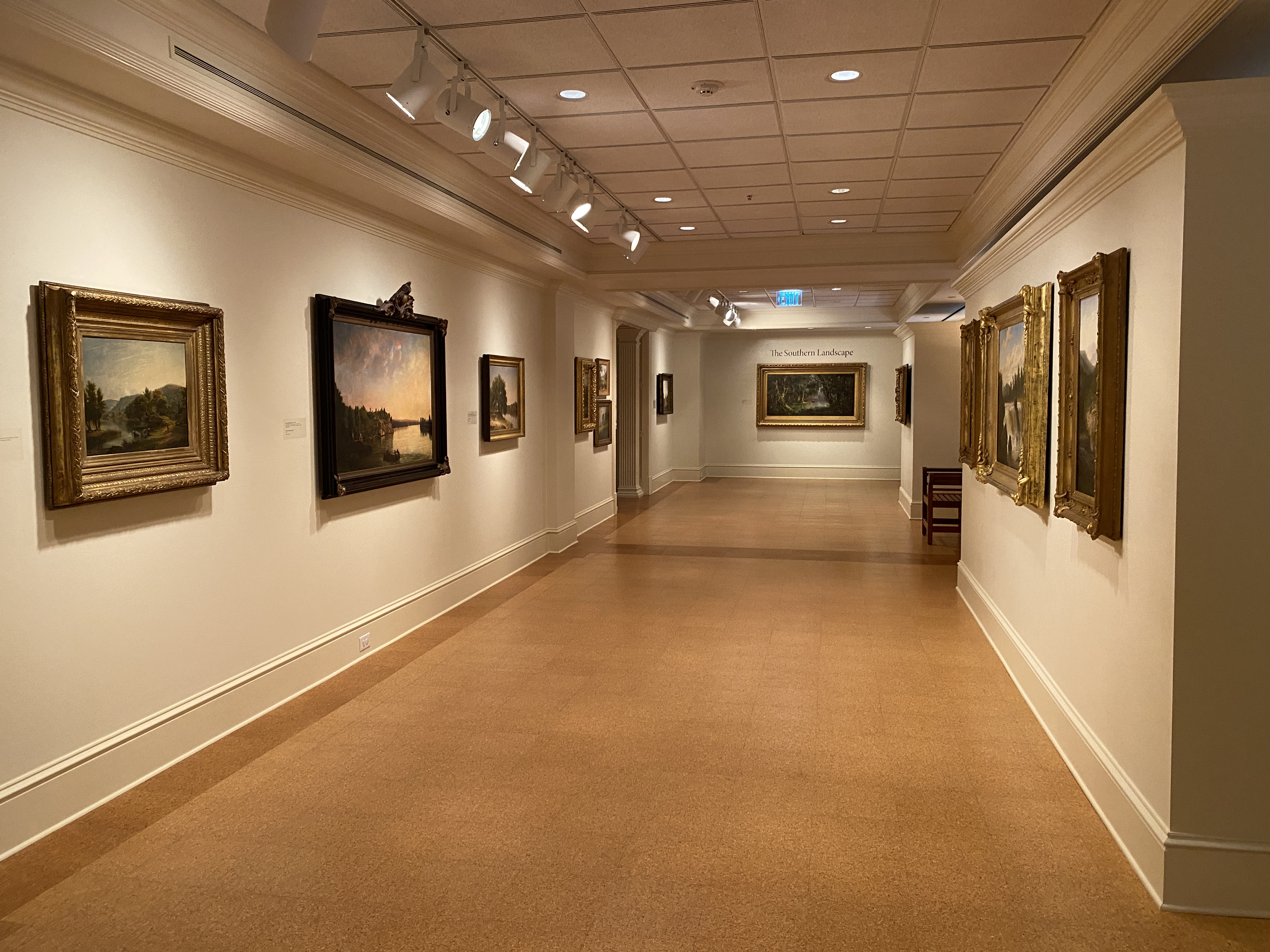
- Established: September 26, 1992
- Location: 1 10th Street; Augusta, Georgia, United States 30901
- Coordinates: 33.4794°N 81.9686°W
- Type: Art museum
- Visitors: 120,000
- Director: Kevin Grogan
- Curator: Kevin Grogan
- Website: www.themorris.org

The Morris Museum of Art is an art museum in Augusta, Georgia. It was established in 1985 as a non-profit foundation by William S. Morris III, publisher of The Augusta Chronicle, in memory of his parents, as the first museum dedicated to the collection and exhibition of art and artists of the American South.

In 1989, Morris bought 230 pictures for the museum from Southern art collector Robert P. Coggins, with Louise Keith Claussen appointed museum director the following year. On September 26, 1992, "The Morris" opened to the public, attracting over 10,000 visitors in the first two months.

With more than 5,000 works in its permanent collection, the museum hosts changing exhibitions, educational programs, musical events, and hands-on art programs. The museum is located adjacent to Riverwalk Augusta and the Savannah River.

== See also ==
- Arts and culture in Augusta, Georgia
