= Summerville (Augusta, Georgia) =

- Summerville Historic District
- U.S. National Register of Historic Places
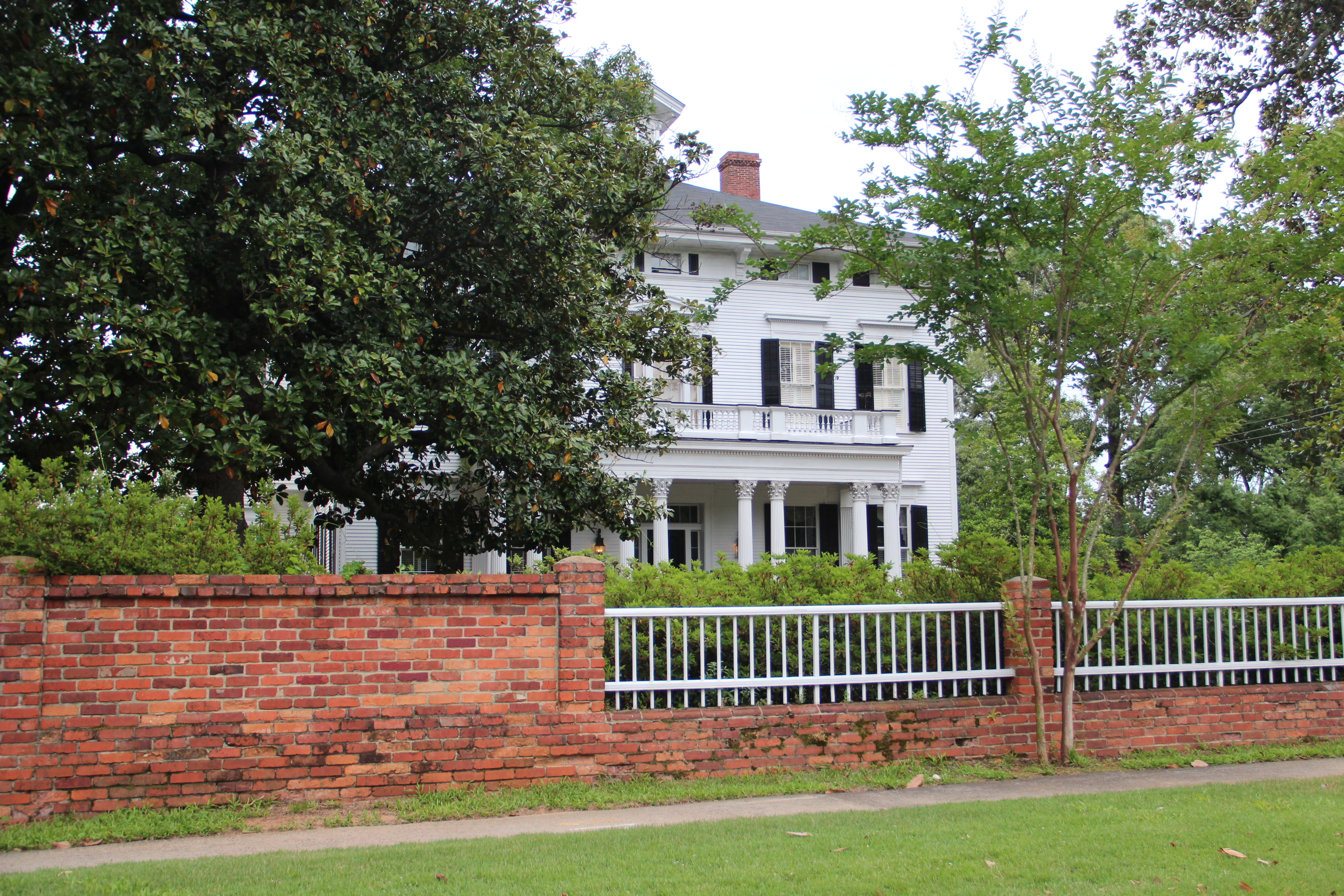
- A house in the Summerville

- Location within Georgia Location within the United States
- Location: Augusta, Georgia, United States
- Coordinates: 33°28′32″N 82°1′7″W
- Area: 730 acres (300 ha)
- Built: 1780s
- Architectural style: Greek, Spanish, Italianate, Victorian, Colonial, Queen Anne, Gothic, Federal, and Romanesque Revival
- NRHP reference No.: 80001229
- Added to NRHP: May 22, 1980

Summerville, (commonly referred to locally as "The Hill"), is a large, affluent residential area and historic district located northwest of downtown Augusta, Georgia. The district is site of the historic homes of John Milledge, George Walton, and Thomas Cumming.

== History ==
=== 18th century ===
Summerville was built in the 1780s, and established as a separate village from the city of Augusta.

=== 19th century ===
During the mid to late 1810s, downtown Augusta experienced a small epidemic of malaria, which caused little effect in Summerville. In 1820, a major outbreak of fever nearly wiped out the entire garrison at the U.S. Arsenal. After a recommendation from an officer, the U.S. Arsenal purchased land that is the present-day site of Augusta University.

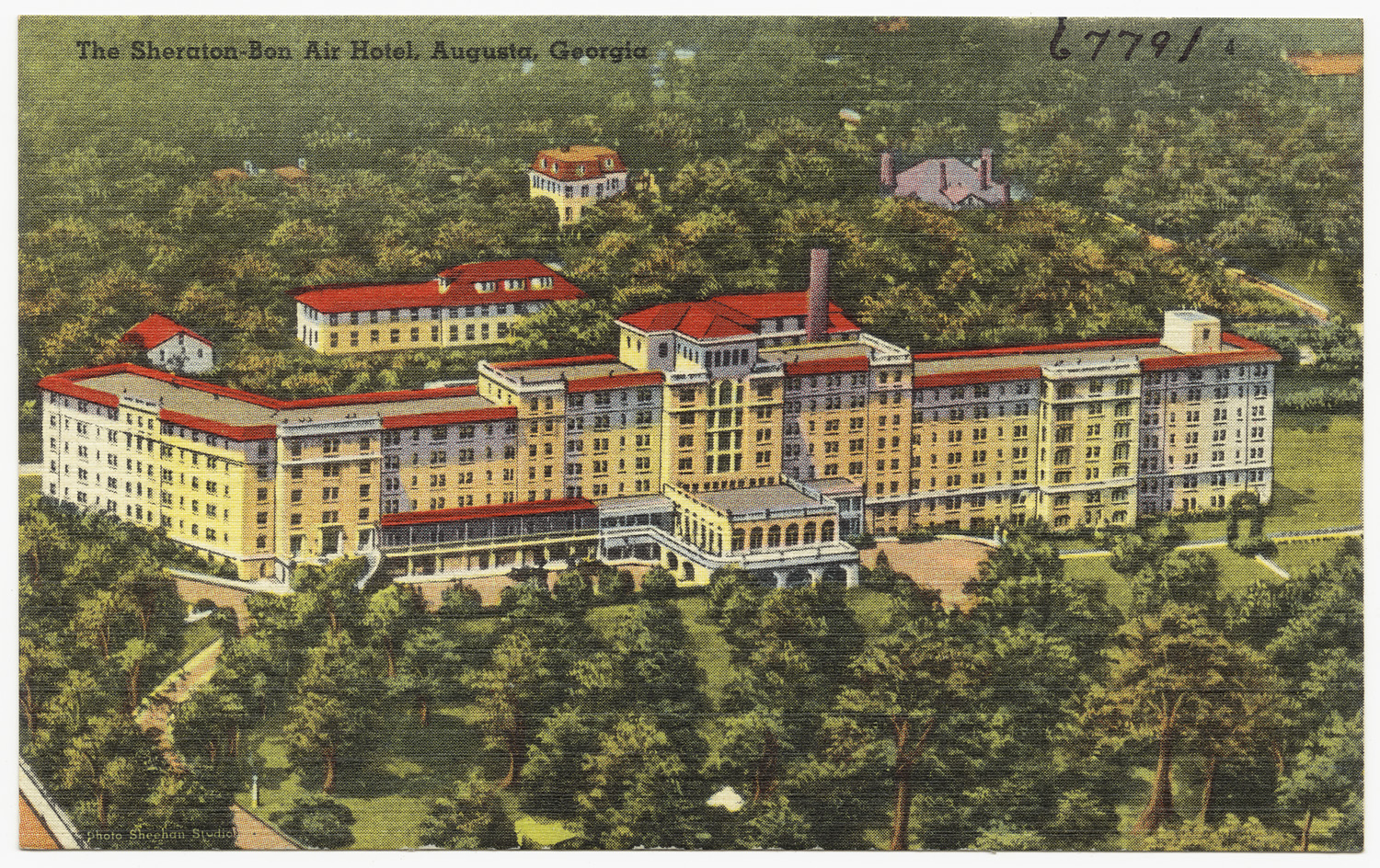
The Historic Bon Air Hotel in the Summerville neighborhood featured on a post card.

By 1850, Summerville became a four-season community. More permanent buildings and year-round homes sprang up as the town prospered. In 1861, Summerville was officially incorporated as a city with the boundaries defined as a circle for one-mile. Later on, Summerville became a fashionable luxury resort and golf capital with the construction of many hotels. This caused a large transformation — from a small summer resort for local residents to a winter playground for wealthy industrialists and politicians from the northern United States. Two hotels, The Partridge Inn and the Bon Air Hotel, hosted captains of industry and former presidents of the United States. Some built winter homes in the area, while others stayed permanently, escaping the harsh winters of the northern U.S.

=== 20th century ===
When the city of Augusta annexed Summerville in 1912, it lost its status as a separate town. Four years later, a fire swept through downtown Augusta, destroying much of the business district and neighborhoods along lower Broad Street. This caused a housing boom for Summerville.

=== 21st century ===
Residents of Summerville and surrounding neighborhoods plan to meet on December 4, 2022 to discuss re-establishing Summerville as a city separate from Augusta–Richmond County. Local attorney Wright McLeod cites public safety, taxation, and the inefficiency of the consolidated government as reasons from splitting from Augusta–Richmond County.

== Historic district ==
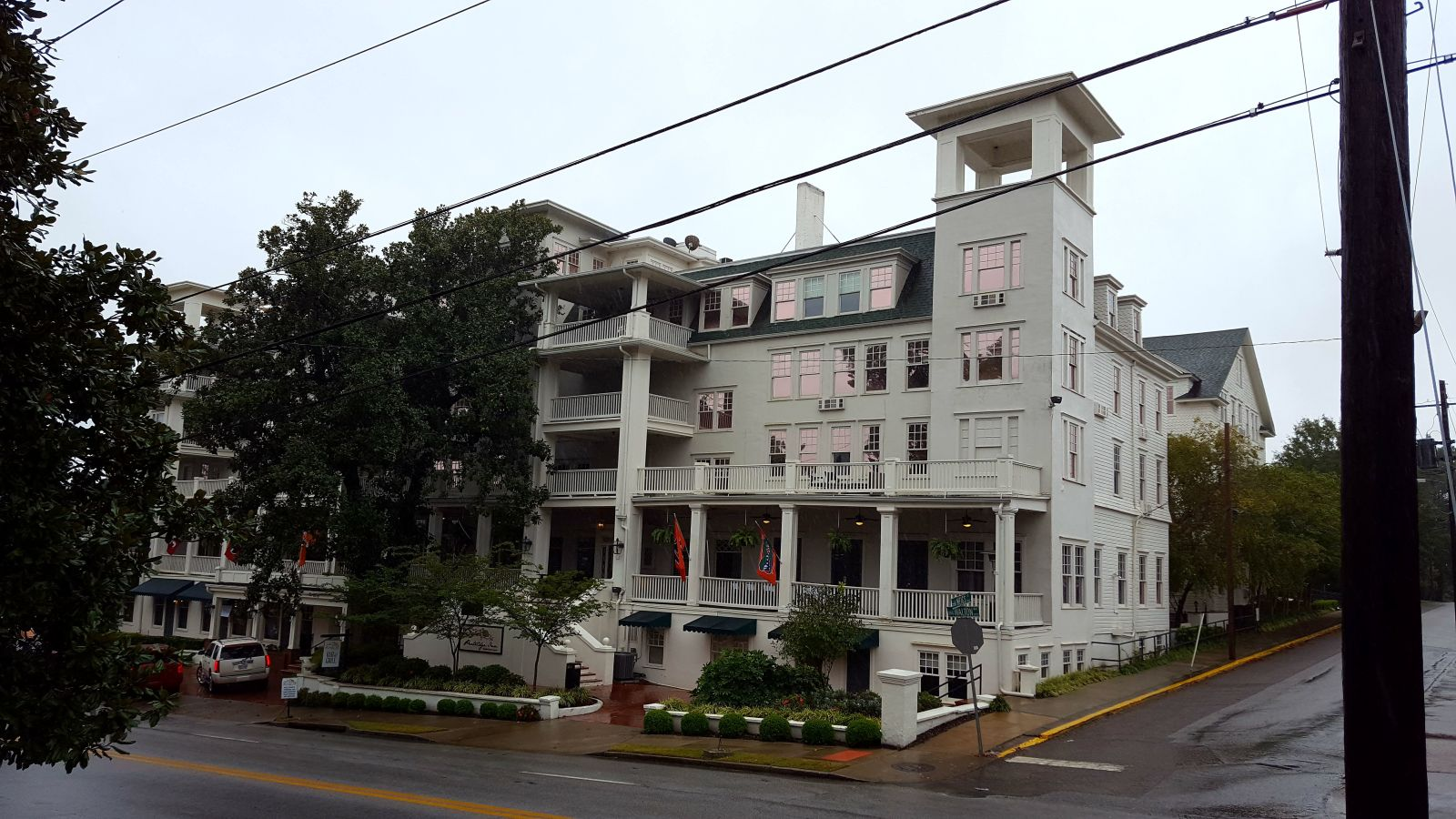
The Partridge Inn

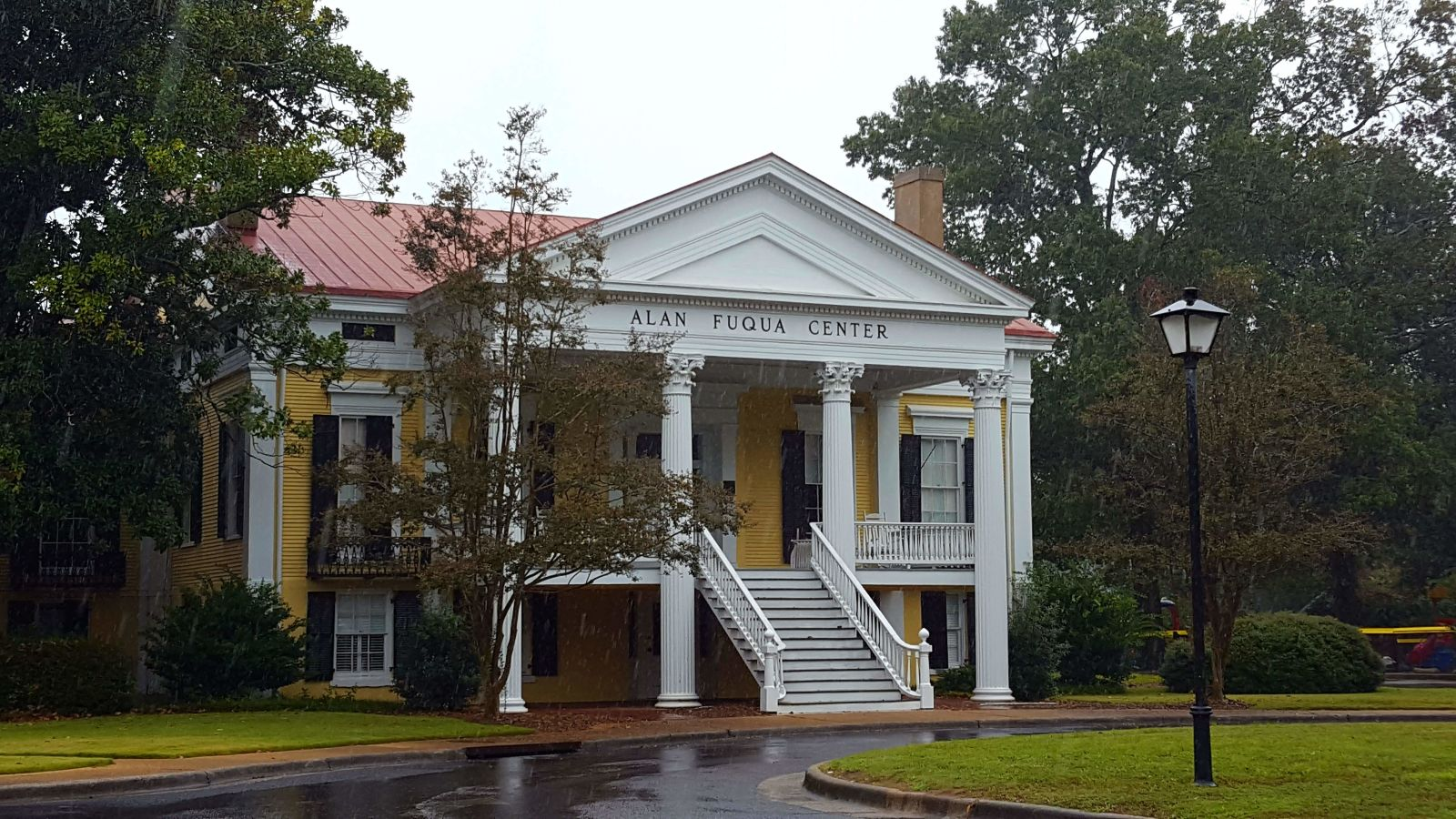
Reid-Jones-Carpenter House

On May 22, 1980, Summerville was added to the National Register of Historic Places, bounding from Highland Ave., Heard Ave., Wrightsboro Rd., Milledge Rd., and Cumming Rd.

=== Historic sites ===
- Summerville Cemetery
- Appleby Library
- Augusta Arsenal
- Partridge Inn — historic hotel that opened in 1860, many northerners stayed to escape the winters of the North (open to this day)
- Stephen Vincent Benet House — historic home on campus of Augusta University
- College Hill — home of George Walton from 1795 to his death in 1804
- Bon Air Hotel
- Reid-Jones-Carpenter House - Individually listed on the National Register of Historic Places, it now houses the Alan Fuqua Center for Young People.
- Salubrity Hall

== Architecture ==
=== Structures ===
The architecture of Summerville include examples of Greek, Italianate, Spanish, Gothic, and many other types.

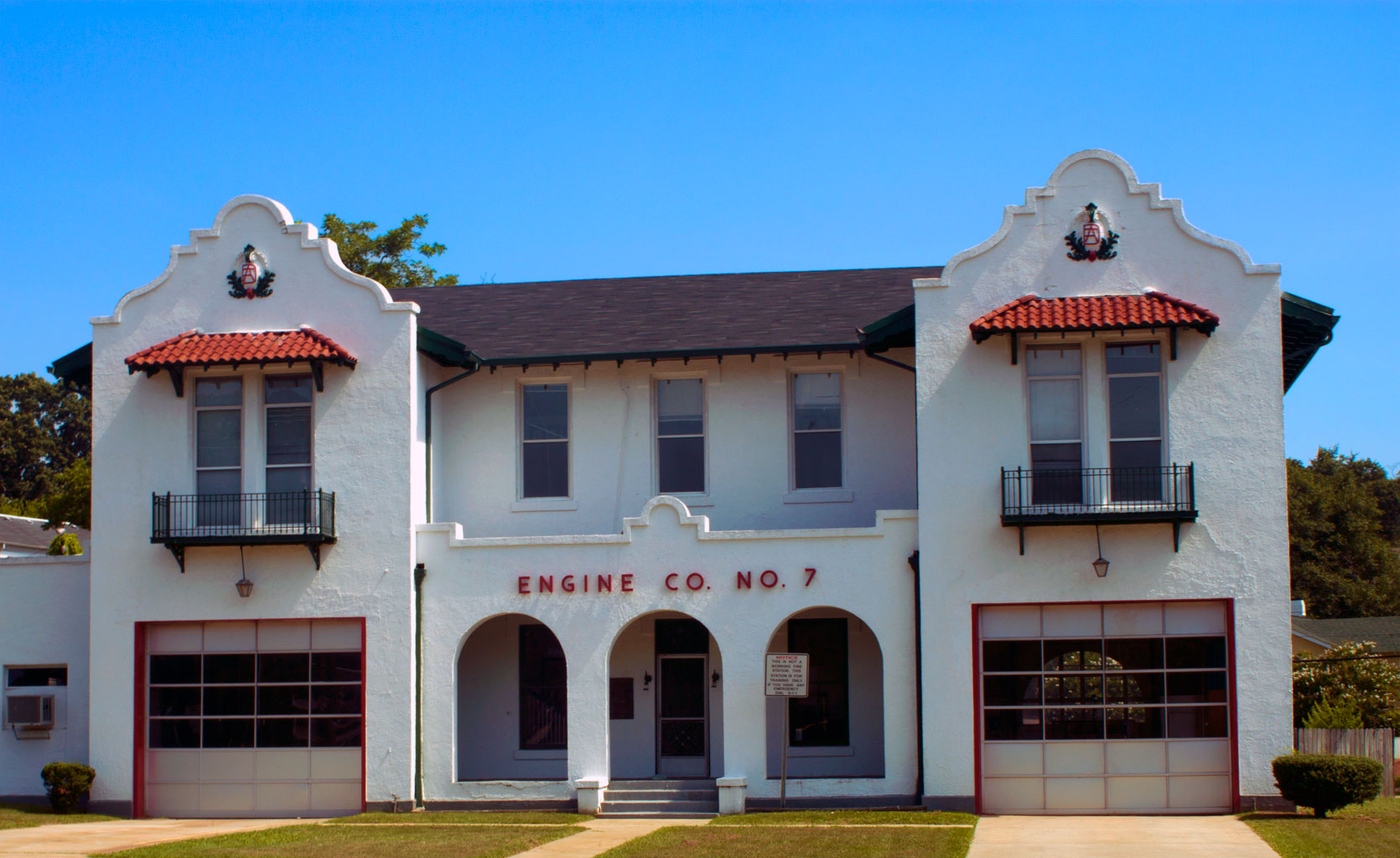
The former Engine Company No. 7 in the Summerville neighborhood is designed in the Spanish Colonial Revival style.

== Notable people ==
- Thomas Cumming (1765-1834), first mayor of Augusta, Georgia
- John Warne Herbert Jr. (1853-1934), played in first ever collegiate football game; business executive
- John Milledge (1757-1818), American politician and former Georgia governor
- George Walton (1749-1804), Founding Father and signer of Declaration of Independence
- Richard H. Wilde (1789-1847), American politician

== See also ==
- Augusta University — located in Summerville
- History of Augusta, Georgia
- Medical District (Augusta, Georgia) — located between Summerville and downtown Augusta
