= Old Government House (Augusta, Georgia) =

- Old Richmond County Courthouse
- U.S. National Register of Historic Places
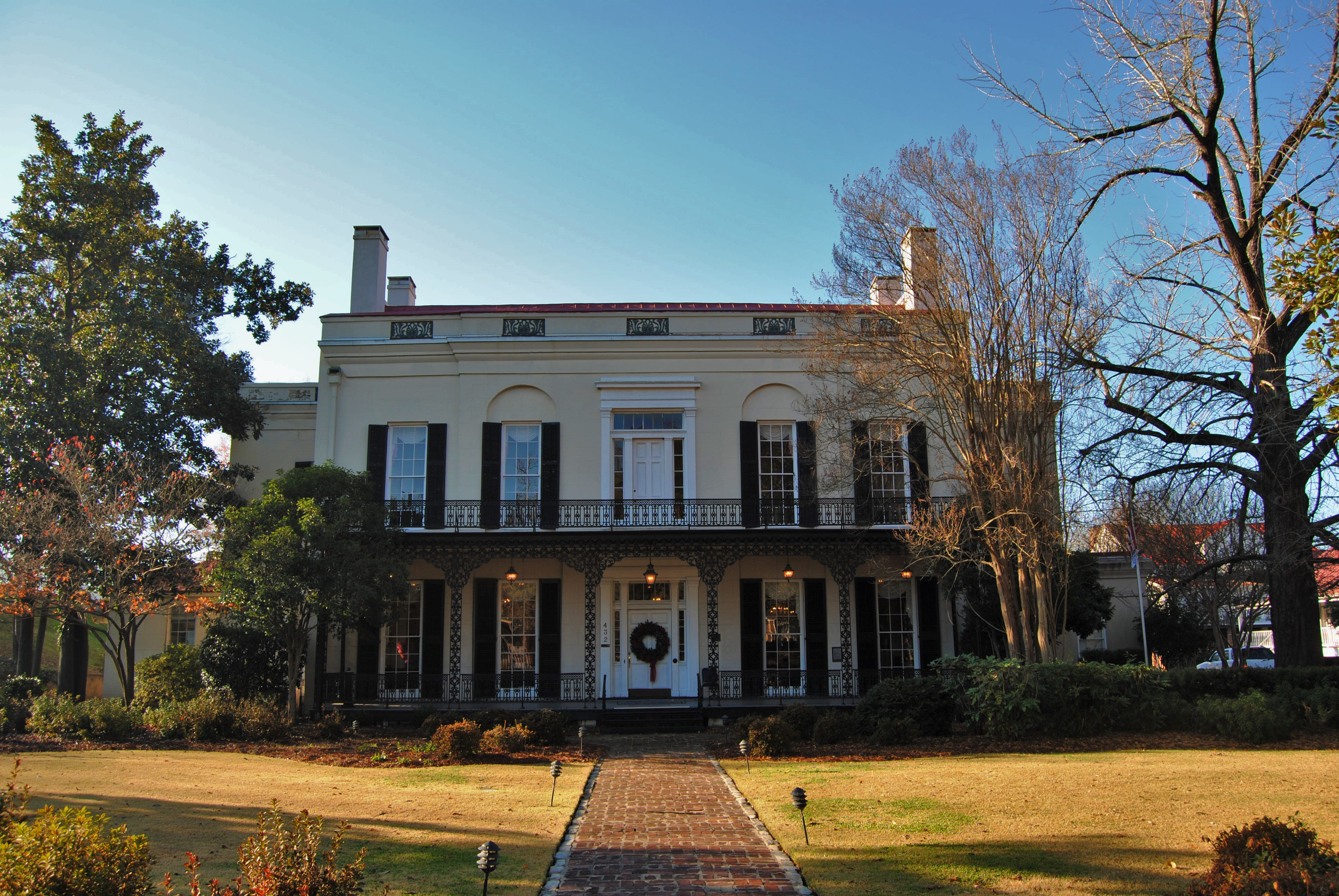

- Location within Georgia Location within the United States
- Location: 432 Telfair Street, Augusta, Georgia
- Coordinates: 33°28′9″N 81°57′34″W
- Built: 1801, 1820-1840
- Architectural style: Greek Revival, Late Victorian, Federal
- NRHP reference No.: 78001004
- Added to NRHP: December 22, 1978

The Old Government House, also known as the Old Richmond County Courthouse, is a historic courthouse located in downtown Augusta, Georgia. It housed the seat of the local government from 1801 to 1821. It is one of the oldest remaining public buildings in the city.

It was built as a courthouse in 1801 and was expanded later when it served as a private residence.

== History ==
=== 19th Century ===
The Old Government House was built in 1801 and housed the seat of the local government. In 1821, the government sold the building to former Mayor Samuel Hale. He converted the Old Government House into an elegant residence. Many other prominent families lived in the building including those of Colonel Paul Fitzsimmons, a Charleston ship magnate, Colonel James Gardner, and James Gregg, son of the founder of Graniteville Mills. In 1877, Dr. Eugene Murphey purchased the property. His family lived in the building for 75 years.

=== 20th Century ===
Dr. Murphey sold the estate to the Augusta Junior League in 1952. The organization used it as a reception facility until the 1970s, when they gave it to Historic Augusta.

It was listed on the National Register of Historic Places in 1978.

The City of Augusta purchased the property in 1987. City officials hired VGR Architect, to revitalize the Old Government House into a reception hall to retain its historic significance.

== Architecture ==
The architecture of the Old Government House has a historic impact on Augusta. It was built in a Federal style brick with parapet end chimneys. When the building became a residence, the owner stuccoed the walls adding the elaborate recessed wings, iron portico, balcony, and trimmed windows. These changes were made in 1821 and 1839.

== Today ==
Today, the Old Government House is a historic reception hall that accommodates various parties and receptions. It can also be seen on the city seal and flag.

== See also ==
- History of Augusta, Georgia
