= Augusta Pride =

Annual LGBT event in Augusta, Georgia

- Frequency: Annual
- Location: Augusta, Georgia (United States)
- Years active: 17
- Inaugurated: June 19, 2010
- Attendance: 14,000 (2019)
- Website: https://www.prideaugusta.org/

Augusta Pride is the LGBTQA (Lesbian, Gay, Bisexual, Transgender, Queer/Questioning, and Asexual/Ally) pride organization in Augusta, Georgia. It hosts a pride parade in downtown Augusta. The event started in 2010.

== Pride Festival ==
A two-day Augusta Pride Festival is held at the Augusta Commons every June. The festival kicks off with a Friday night concert and dance party known as Beats on Broad which has previously featured headliners Bebe Rexha and Dev.

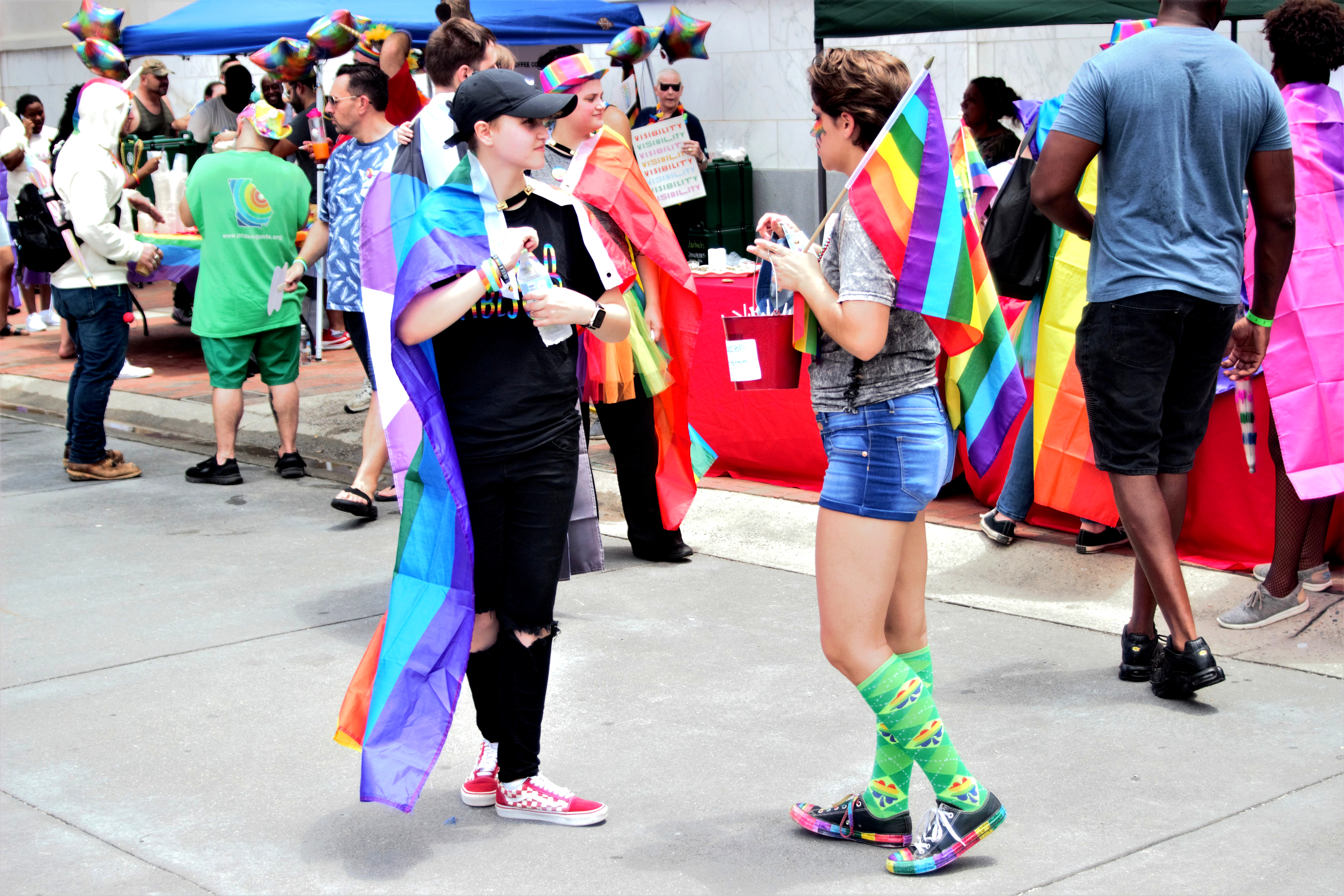
Attendees at the Augusta Pride Festival in 2019

The second day kicks off with the Augusta Pride Parade down Broad Street in Downtown Augusta before the festival starts with live music and vendors set up at the Augusta Commons for festival goers to enjoy.

== See also ==
- Arts and culture in Augusta, Georgia
- LGBTQ rights in Georgia (U.S. state)
