= List of public art in Augusta, Georgia =

This is a list of public art in Augusta, Georgia, in the United States. This list applies only to works of public art on permanent display in an outdoor public space. For example, this does not include artworks in museums. Public art may include sculptures, statues, monuments, memorials, murals, and mosaics.

Image	Title / subject	Location and coordinates	Date	Artist / designer	Type	Material	Dimensions	Designation	Owner / administrator	Wikidata	Notes
More images	Augusta Confederate Monument	700 block of Broad Street 33°28′29.7″N 81°57′51.7″W	1878		Monument	Carrara marble Granite				Q4820908	
	Augusta-CSRA Vietnam War Veterans Memorial	Broad Street median, between Third and Fourth Streets	2019		Monument	Bronze; Granite				Q85744129	
	Four Southern Poets Monument	On Greene Street 33°28′23.11″N 81°57′56.45″W	1913		Monument	Granite				Q43081133	
More images	Signers Monument	On Greene Street, in front of the Augusta Municipal Center 33.47164°N 81.961546°W	1848	Robert French	Obelisk	Granite				Q3323354	
