= Augusta fire of 1916 =

Fire in Georgia, United States

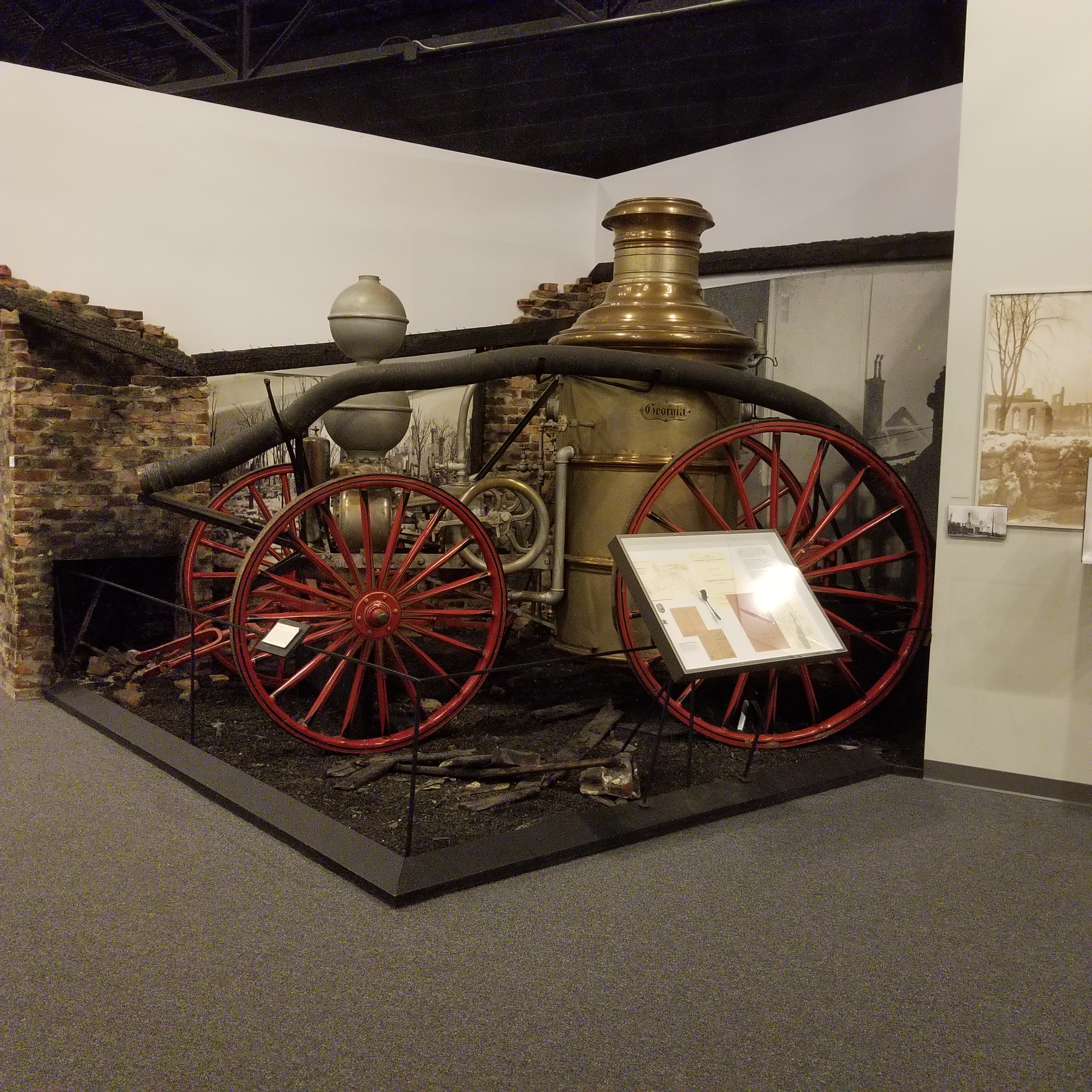
- Display about the Augusta fire of 1916 at the Augusta Museum of History
- Date: March 22, 1916
- Time: 6:20pm (fire department notified)
- Location: Started in the Dyer Building at the northwest corner of Broad and Eighth Streets
- Cause: Unattended clothes iron in a tailor's shop
- Deaths: None
- Property damage: Much of central Augusta, Georgia; $10 million ($296 million in 2025)

The Augusta fire of 1916 devastated the central business district of Augusta, Georgia on March 22, 1916. It began in the Dyer Building at the northwest corner of Broad and Eighth Streets and spread quickly to adjacent businesses, destroying notable buildings, churches, and schools in Augusta's historic core. Some had stood for almost 200 years, and a series of photographs captured the event. The fire, ultimately blamed on an unattended clothes iron in a tailor's shop, is the worst fire in Augusta's history and impacted 35 city blocks from 8th Street to East Boundary Street. The total area included portions of downtown and Olde Town Augusta, extending to the Savannah River. Winds created by the fire were so strong that the bell at Saint Paul's Church rang by itself, and scorched prayer books and hymnals were blown across the Savannah River into South Carolina. Although no residents were killed, the City of Augusta incurred $10 million ($296 million in 2025) in damages. Many thousands of cotton bales were destroyed and an estimated 3,000 people were made homeless. Some 541 residences and 141 commercial buildings were destroyed in the blaze. A central residential area became an empty lot with only chimneys remaining, and the commercial street known as "Cotton Row" was completely destroyed. The prominent Lamar Building, under construction in 1916, had to be demolished after the fire.

== Responses ==
Due to the size of the large fire, fire departments from neighboring cities responded, including those of Atlanta, Savannah, Columbia, Macon, Greenville, Waynesboro, and Charleston.

Following the blaze, the chief of Augusta's fire department made allegations against city officials that were published in The Augusta Chronicle. He directly blamed officials for being remiss in enacting adequate building standards, while allowing substandard wood framing and shingles. He further accused them of failing to provide adequate water pressure, which had dropped rapidly at the start of the fire and remained unusually low throughout the following hours.

== Gallery ==
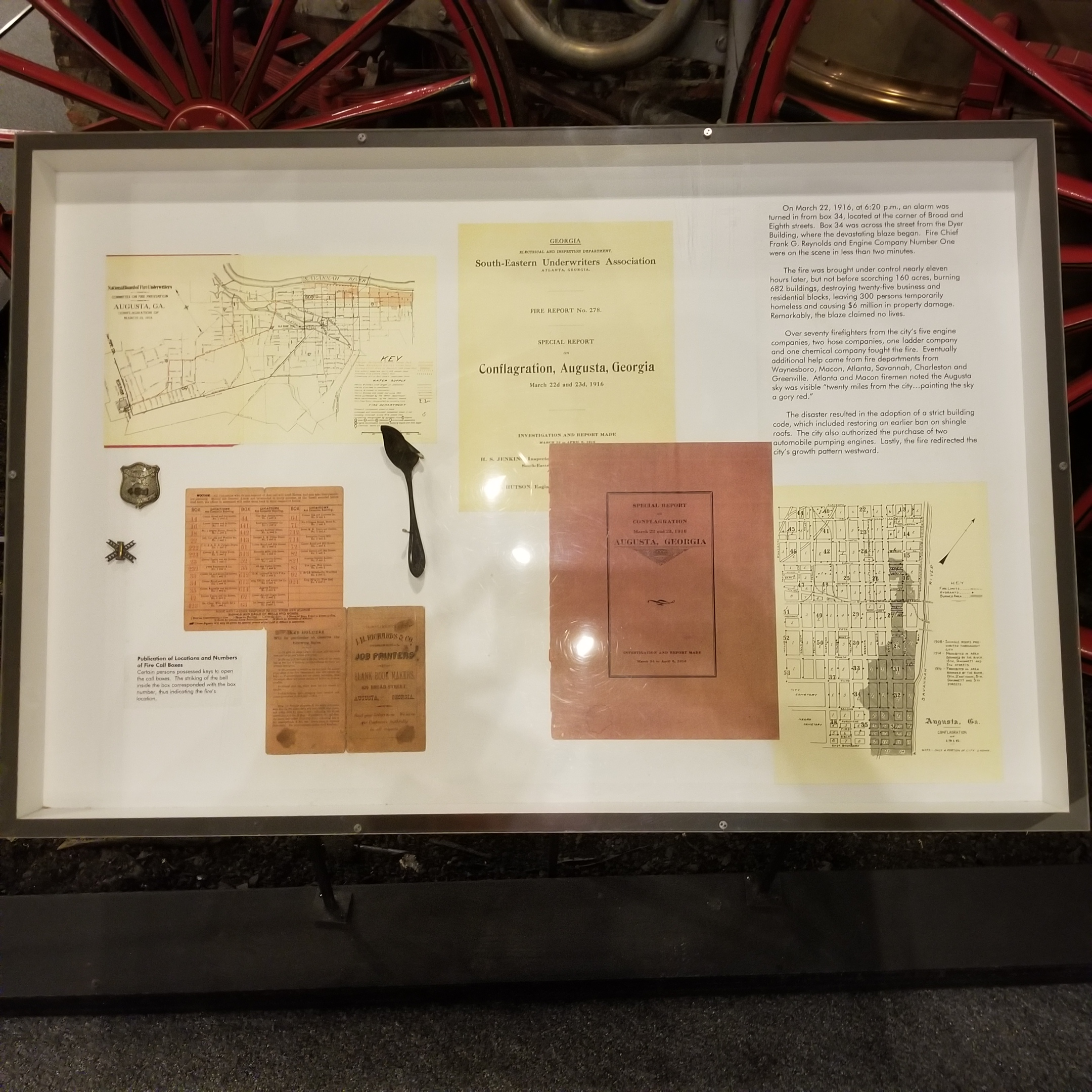
Close up of the display board of the display with documents about the fire
