= Partridge Inn =

Historic hotel in Augusta, Georgia, US

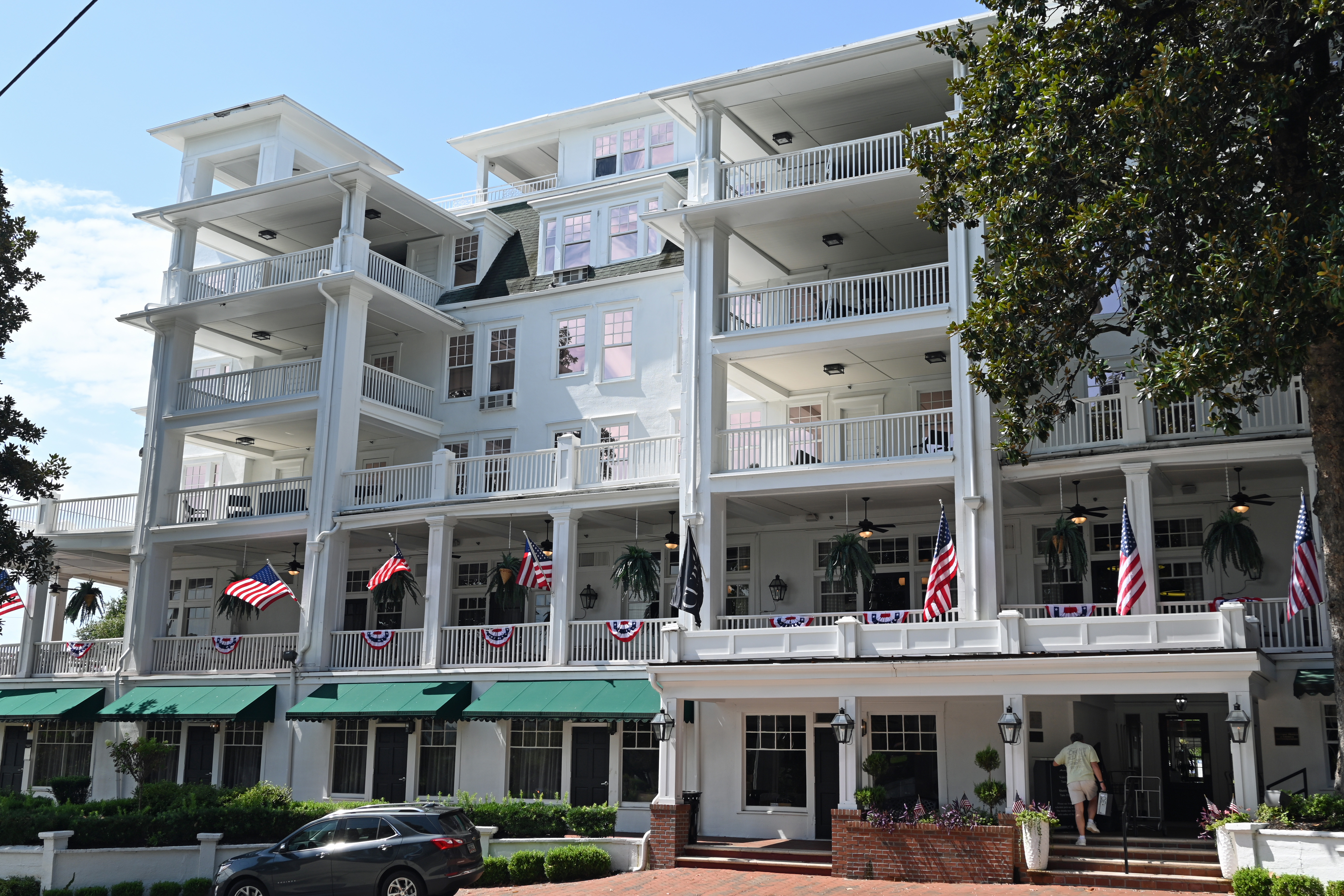
- In 2022

- Location within Georgia

General information
- Location: 2110 Walton Way, Augusta, Georgia
- Coordinates: 33.475234°N 82.010006°W

The Partridge Inn, in Augusta, Georgia, is a hotel in the Curio Collection by Hilton. Its current full name is The Partridge Inn Augusta, Curio Collection by Hilton.

== History ==
A portion of the hotel began as part of a private home in 1836. The area developed into a popular destination for vacationers escaping the winter in the Northeast United States. The hotel was officially opened in 1910. In 1923, city officials chose the Partridge as the site of a gala for then-President Warren G. Harding.

After Henry Flagler extended railroads to Florida and shifted tourist demand from Georgia to Florida, the owner of the Partridge Inn sold the building. After a period as an apartment building, the building fell into disrepair and was slated for demolition. In the 1980s, civic leaders in Augusta saved the building from demolition and it reopened as a hotel in 1988.

The hotel celebrated its centennial in 2010. It was renovated in 2022 at a cost of $10 million.

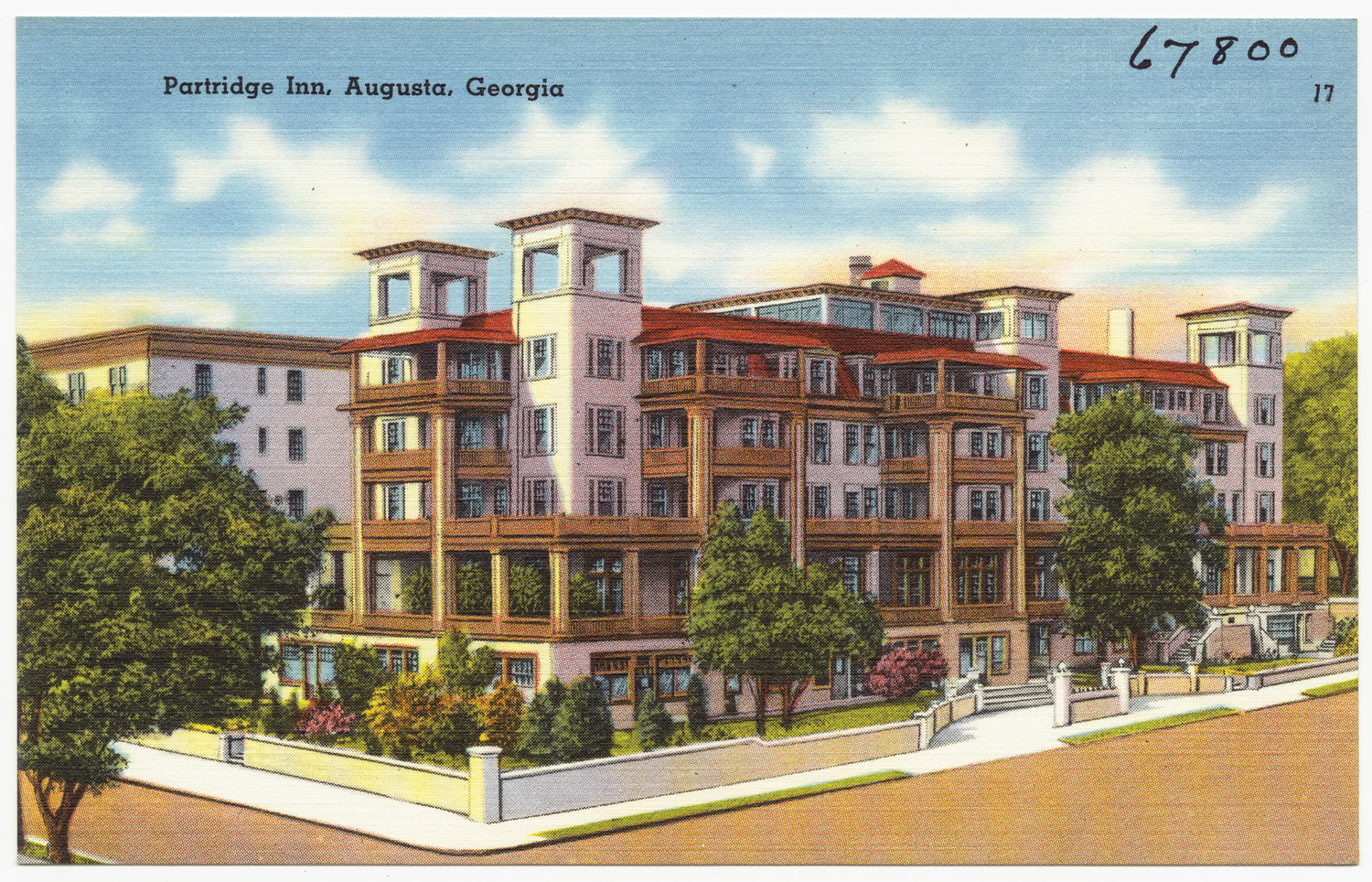
Historic postcard (1930–45)

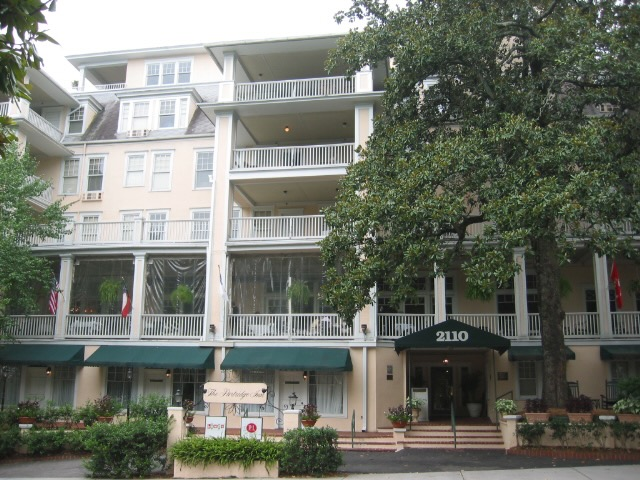
2004 view
