= Broad Street Historic District (Augusta, Georgia) =

Historic district in Georgia, United States

Coordinates: 33.471874°N 81.965047°W

- U.S. National Register of Historic Places
- U.S. Historic district
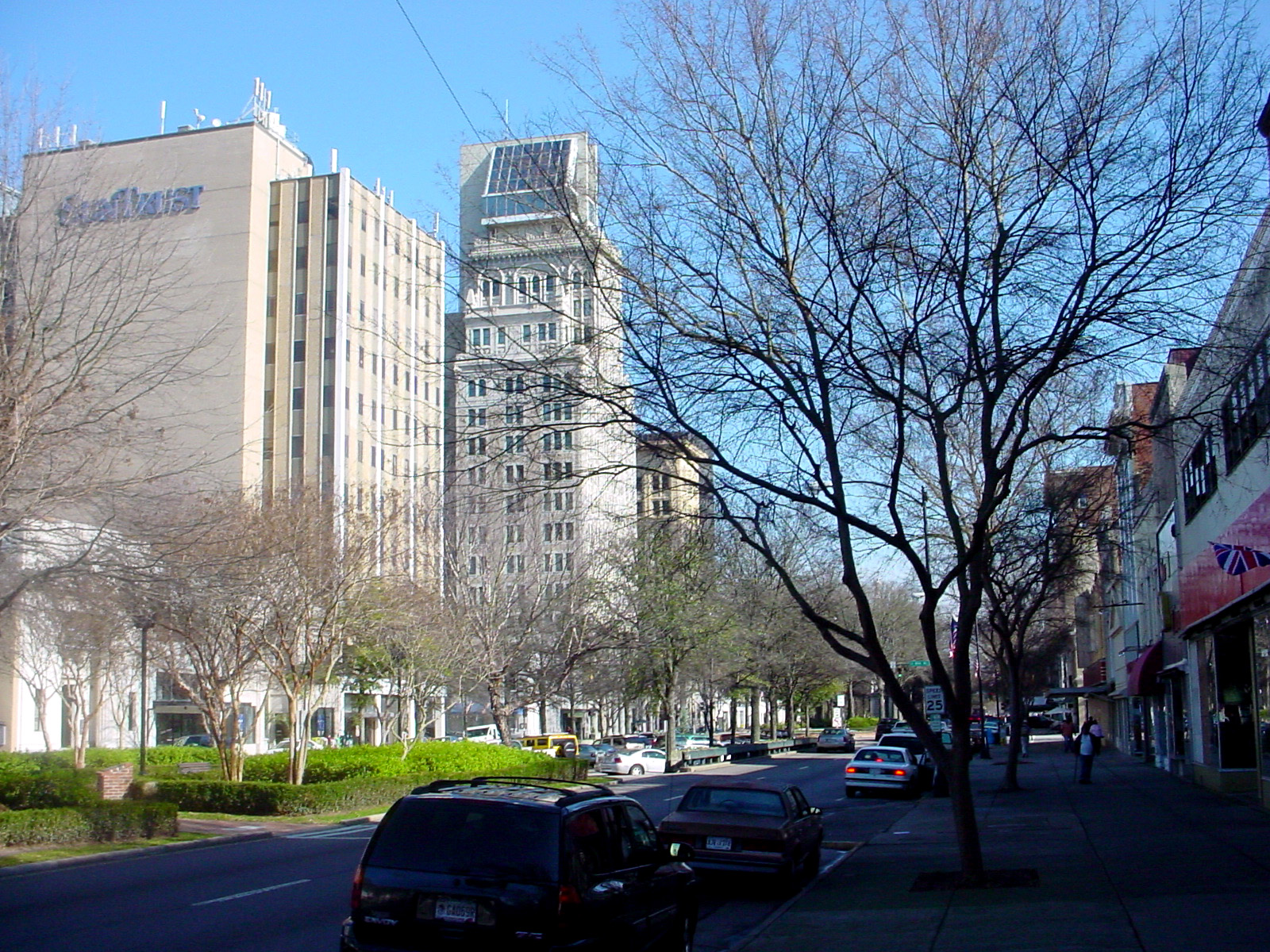
- Lamar Building on Broad Street

- Location within Georgia Location within the United States
- Location: Broad Street between 5th and 13th Streets, Augusta, Georgia
- Area: 70 acres (28 ha)
- Built: 1780
- Architect: Multiple
- Architectural style: Mixed (more Than 2 Styles From Different Periods)
- NRHP reference No.: 80001226
- Added to NRHP: April 28, 1980

The Broad Street Historic District in Augusta, Georgia is a 70 acres (28 ha) historic district that was listed on the National Register of Historic Places (NRHP) in 1980. It includes 158 contributing buildings.

The Historic District portion of Broad Street stretches from 13th to 5th Streets. Starting at 13th Street (U.S. Route 25 Business), Broad Street picks up the US 25 Business designation. This section has double-sided median parking. This is Broad Street at its widest point. At the intersection with 6th Street, the Chamber of Commerce building, originally designed by I.M. Pei in the late 1970's can be found in the median.

Beginning in July of 2025 a major renovation of Broad Street began. Construction began on the 800 block with the removal of the "parking pits" and the beginning of the construction of James Brown Linear Park on the median next to the Augusta Common. The construction project will completely redesign the segments between Washington Road and East Boundary Road, though most of the project will be focusing on the median between 15th Street and 5th Street. A major concern of retail businesses in the district has been about how the project reduces the number of parking spaces on Broad Street from 760 to 590 spaces. As a result a decision was made to add more parking spaces on the adjacent Reynolds and Ellis Streets, which run parallel to Broad Street. A decision was also made to convert Ellis Street into a one-way street to help accommodate more parking on that street. "'Augusta alters Broad Street plans to make up for lost parking'". WJBF. December 18, 2016.

== Notable buildings & Locations ==
- Imperial Theatre
- Augusta Common
- Lamar Building, at 753 Broad Street, a building which is separately NRHP-listed.
- Miller Theater — reopened in January 2018
- James Brown Linear Park - In the median of the 800 block, A park currently under construction and will feature the James Brown Statue, previously located there in the early 2000's.
- News Building — home of The Augusta Chronicle

=== Haunted Pillar ===
The Haunted Pillar on Broad Street

The Haunted Pillar was a landmark left standing near the remains of a farmer's market that once stood at 5th and Broad Streets in downtown Augusta, Georgia. The market stood from 1830 until February 7, 1878, when it was destroyed by a tornado. A year later, the column was moved to the opposite corner of what is now 5th Street and used to display advertisements by Theodore Eye's Broad Street Grocery. In 1930, the town of Augusta hired a press agency to help stimulate its economy. The New York City-based firm AuLockhart International, Inc. was hired and given a budget of $37,500 to $50,000 to create and publish an advertising campaign aimed at attracting tourists. The firm published a ghost story about the pillar in newspapers across the country. The story refers to the pillar as “The Haunted Pillar.”

According to local folk-lore, a preacher who was denied the right to preach there, "... threatened that a great wind would destroy the place except for one pillar and that whoever tried to remove this remaining pillar would be struck dead," according to a person interviewed by The Augusta Chronicle.

The market was located directly in the middle of Broad Street, and once it was removed Augustans were reluctant to build there again. "Now that the Market House is in ruins, we think it may be opportune to suggest that it never be rebuilt upon the same spot. It was, at best, an unsightly edifice and marred the grand boulevard upon which it was mistakenly located," said an article in The Augusta Chronicle a week after the market was destroyed.

On December 17, 2016, the pillar was destroyed in a car collision.

== See also ==
- Augusta Downtown Historic District
- History of Augusta, Georgia
