= Rock Fore! Dough Concert =

Coordinates: 33°28′0″N 82°2′52″W

- Genre: Rock
- Dates: April 7th
- Locations: Augusta, Georgia
- Years active: 2005-present
- Founders: Joe Stevenson, Andy Levine
- Website: www.rockforedough.com

The Drive for Show, Rock Fore! Dough Concert is an annual American rock benefit concert that is played at the First Tee of Augusta in Augusta, Georgia. The charitable concert was first performed in 2005.

== Attendance ==
=== 2005 ===
The 2005 Rock Fore! Dough Concert was performed on May 4, 2005, and had an audience of 6,000 people. The charitable concert raised an estimated $54,000.

=== 2006 ===
The 2006 Rock Fore! Dough Concert was performed on January 20, 2006, and had an audience of 7,800. The concert raised an estimated $90,000.

=== 2007 ===
The 2007 Rock Fore! Dough Concert was performed on April 3, 2007, and had an audience of 5,000. The concert raised an estimated $20,000.

=== 2008 ===
The 2008 Rock Fore! Dough Concert was performed on April 9, 2008, and had an audience of 8,500. The concert raised an estimated $68,000.

== Performances ==
Some notable performances at the Rock Fore! Dough Concert include:

- Colbie Caillat
- Josh Kelley
- Hootie & the Blowfish
- John Krueger
- Collective Soul
- Edwin McCain
- Sister Hazel
- Edison Project
- Pat Blanchard Band
- Dashboard Confessional
- Corey Smith
- John Kolbeck
- Cheap Trick
