= Georgia Bank & Trust =

Georgia Bank & Trust Company
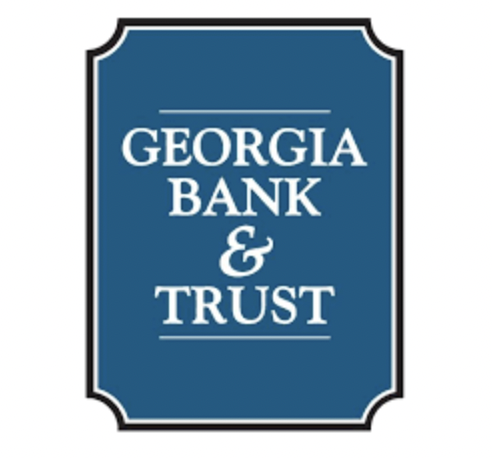
- Industry: Banking
- Founded: August 28, 1989; 36 years ago
- Defunct: January 4, 2017; 9 years ago
- Fate: Acquired by South State Corporation
- Headquarters: Augusta, Georgia
- Key people: Dr. Randolph R. Smith; (Chairman); Jay B. Forrester; (President)
- Total assets: ▲$1.9 billion (2016)

Georgia Bank & Trust Company was a bank based in Augusta, Georgia. It was a subsidiary of Southeastern Bank Financial Corporation, a bank holding company. It was the largest bank headquartered in Augusta, Georgia and was second in market share in the city. In 2017, the company was acquired by South State Corporation.

== History ==
The bank was founded on August 28, 1989.

In 1997, R. Daniel Blanton was named chief executive officer of the bank.

In 2002, the bank reached $500 million in assets.

In 2006, the bank reached $1 billion in assets.

In October 2016, Jay B. Forrester was named president of the company.

In 2017, the company was acquired by South State Corporation.
