= Miller Theater =

Former movie theatre

Coordinates: 33.474395°N 81.963827°W

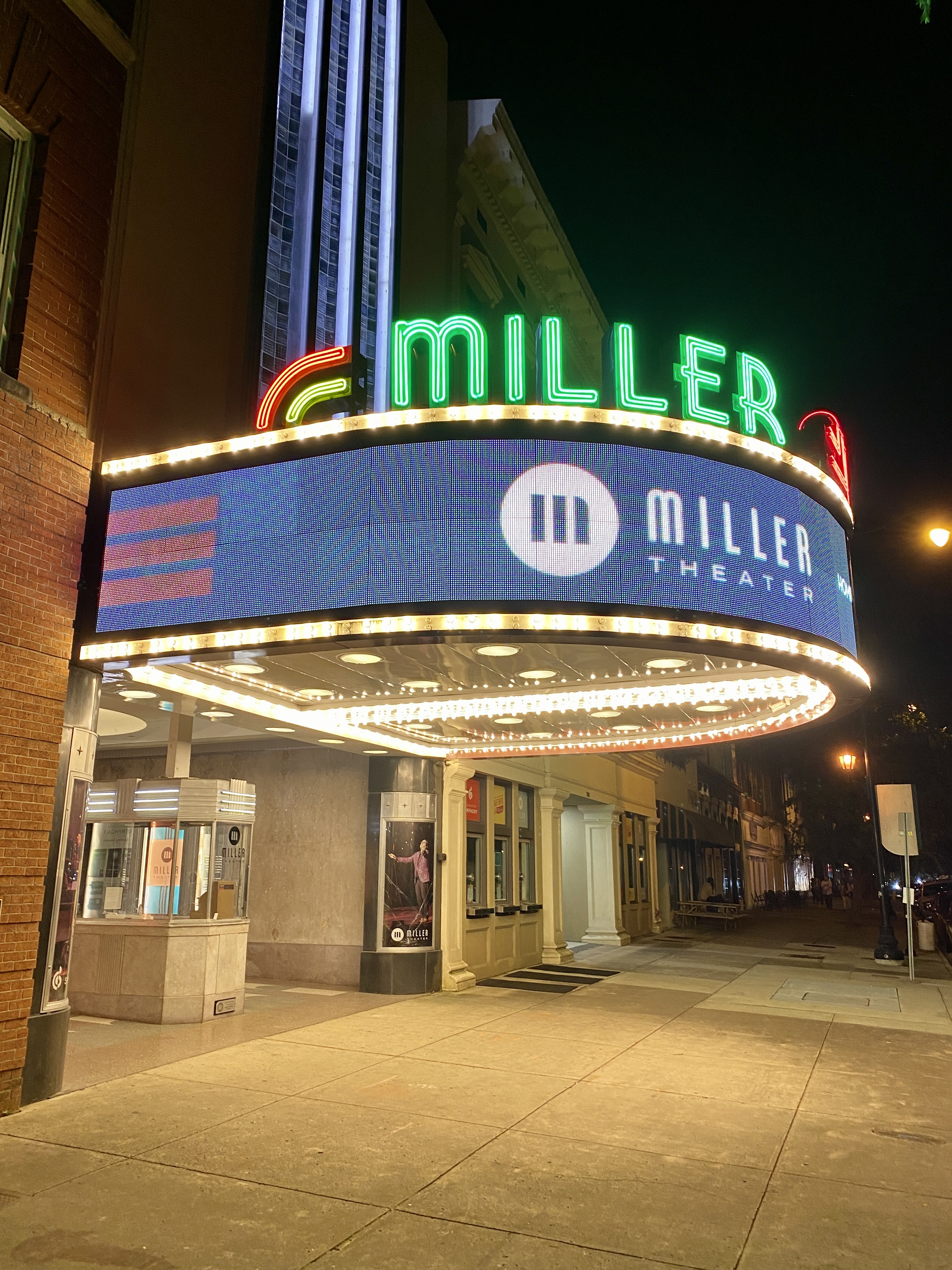
- Interactive map of Miller Theater
- Address: 708 Broad Street; Augusta, Georgia, 30901; USA
- Owner: Augusta Symphony Orchestra
- Capacity: 1,284

Website
- www.millertheateraugusta.com

The Miller Theater is a former movie theater and vaudeville house in Augusta, Georgia. The Miller was built by architect Roy A. Benjamin utilizing the Arte Moderne style of architecture and was owned by Frank Miller. Due to an economic downturn in the 1980s in downtown Augusta, the theater was forced to close. It sat dormant until 2005 when it was purchased by local Augusta businessman and entrepreneur Peter S. Knox IV. The first action taken after the purchase of the theater was to repair the roof to stop further damage to the structure.

The theater reopened on January 6, 2018 to a sold out gala featuring Sutton Foster performing with Augusta Symphony Orchestra (Augusta, Georgia).

== History ==
For more than 20 years, the name Frank J. Miller was synonymous with entertainment in Augusta, GA. Through his company Augusta Amusements, he and his partners operated five downtown theaters and the brightest star in that constellation was the Miller.

In 1938, Jacksonville-based architect Roy Benjamin was commissioned to design a theater large enough to accommodate the city's growing audiences. The result was a beautiful Art Moderne-style building that featured Italian marble terrazzo, black walnut millwork and a performance stage framed by fluted columns and hand-painted panels. Named after its founder, the Miller Theater seated over 1600 patrons and was the second-largest theater in Georgia, behind only Atlanta's Fox Theatre (Atlanta).

The Miller opened in February 1940 with a sold-out performance of “A Night at the Moulin Rouge”, beginning what would be a 40-year run as one of Augusta's premier entertainment destinations. Hundreds of movies, musical acts and other memorable events found an audience at the Miller Theater.

The Miller Theater pictured in December 2007.

The theater closed in 1984, falling into disrepair until 2005, when Augusta businessman and philanthropist Peter Knox IV bought it with the goal of preservation. After installing a new roof and an updated ventilation system and removing water-damaged carpets and fixtures, Mr. Knox began considering what would be best for the theater and community moving forward. In 2008, Mr. Knox offered the Miller Theater to the Augusta Symphony as a performing venue and home and, after extensive feasibility studies, the Symphony Board of Directors accepted his generous offer.

A capital campaign was launched, and in June 2016, thanks to the generosity of the community and many foundations, coupled with SPLOST funds and federal and state historic preservation tax credits, enough funding was in place to break ground.

The renovation project, which has spanned more than seven years and cost nearly $25 million, is a testament to the volunteers and donors who believed there was real worth in not only preserving an important piece of Augusta history, but also providing its symphony orchestra a permanent home and the community a state-of-the-art venue designed with a variety of artists and stage performances in mind.

== Past Performances ==
Some past performances include but are not limited to:

- St.Paul & The Broken Bones
- Texas Tenors
- Postmodern Jukebox
- Gordon Lightfoot
- Chonda Pierce
- Ron White
- Weird Al Yankovic
- Marshall Tucker Band
- Three Dog Night
- Boz Scaggs
- Jeff Foxworthy
- Drivin N Cryin
- Mat Franco
- Gov't Mule
- Blues Traveler
- Toto
- Tom Segura
- Stephen Stills & Judy Collins
- Cirque Productions Dreams Holidaze
- Moon Taxi
- Shovels & Rope
- Kenny G
- The Marcus King Band
- Kansas

== In popular culture ==
- The Miller Theater is featured in third episode of American Music Spotlight. This rockumentary dives into the history of the Miller Theater and presents the performance of Shovels & Rope in 4k.

== See also ==
- Broad Street Historic District (Augusta, Georgia)
- Arts and culture in Augusta, Georgia
