= Lamar Building =

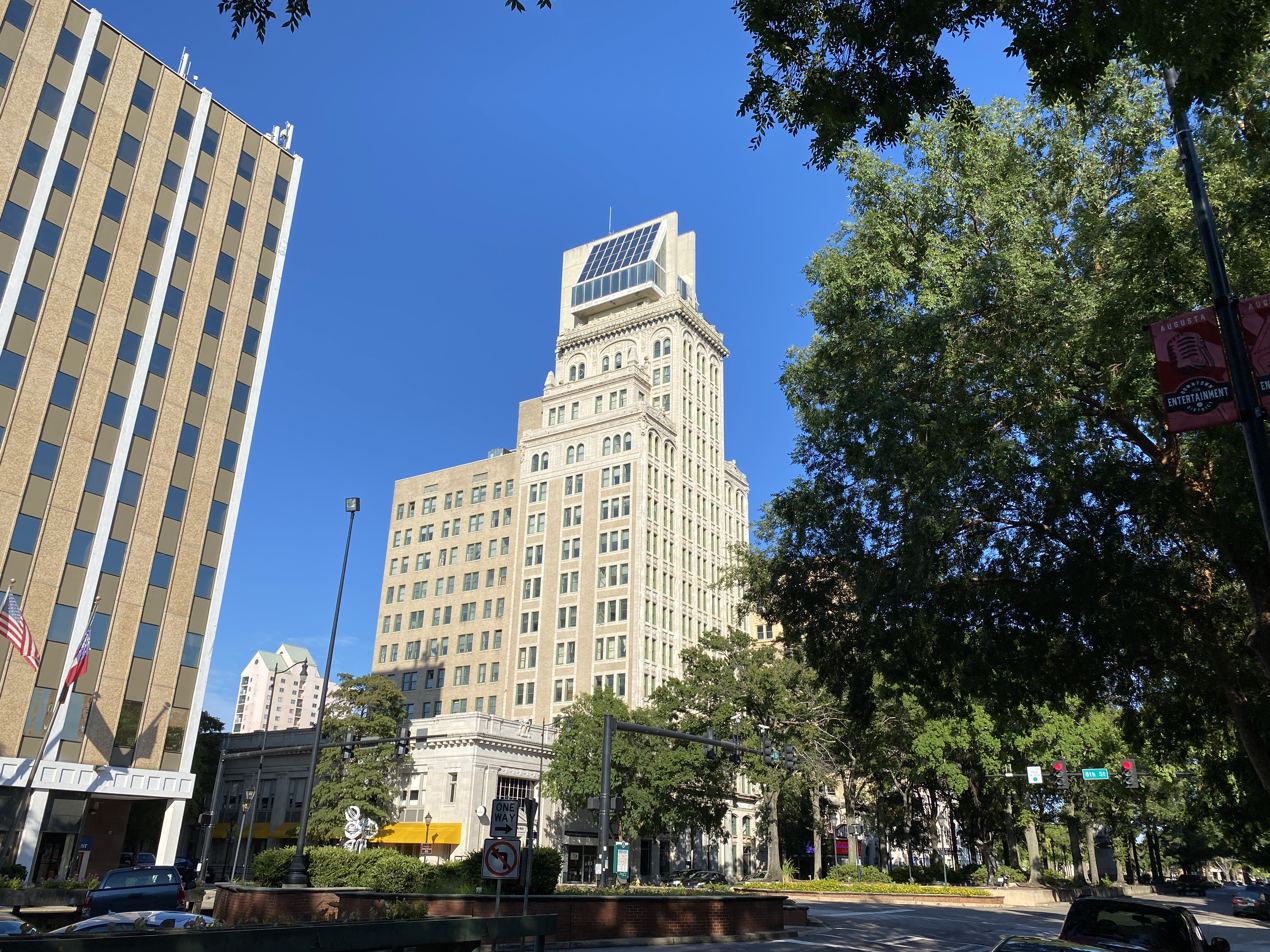
- The Lamar Building on Broad Street in Downtown Augusta.
- Interactive map of the Lamar Building area

General information
- Type: Office
- Location: 753 Broad Street, Augusta, Georgia
- Coordinates: 33°28′31.7″N 81°57′53.2″W
- Construction started: 1913
- Completed: 1918
- Owner: Pace Burt

Height
- Roof: 238 ft (72.5 m)

Technical details
- Floor count: 17
- Lifts/elevators: 3

Design and construction
- Architects: G. Lloyd Preacher; William Lee Stoddart (original building); I.M. Pei & Partners (penthouse addition)

Website
- www.augustalamar.com
- Lamar Building
- U.S. National Register of Historic Places
- U.S. Historic district – Contributing property
- Location within Georgia Location within the United States
- Area: 0.35 acres (0.1 ha)
- Part of: Augusta Downtown Historic District (ID04000515)
- NRHP reference No.: 79000744

Significant dates
- Added to NRHP: April 24, 1979
- Designated CP: June 11, 2004

The Lamar Building is a 17-story skyscraper in Augusta, Georgia. It was scheduled to be completed in 1916, but the Augusta Fire of 1916 forced crews to demolish the building and restart. It was finally completed in 1918. A penthouse level was added in 1976, designed by I. M. Pei. In July 2011, the architectural critic James Howard Kunstler labeled it his "Eyesore of the Month", saying the addition is reminiscent of a Darth Vader helmet.

Pei's addition presaged the glass pyramid he designed for The Louvre in Paris.

The building was placed on the National Register of Historic Places in 1979. Fire insurance maps indicate a height of 165' (50 m) to the top of the roof at the 16th floor, just beneath the penthouse addition.

It has been the tallest building in Augusta ever since it was built. The Marion Building stands next to the Lamar Building and has been called its "sister building".

The Lamar Building was added to the National Register of Historic Places in 1979.

== Restoration efforts ==
After sitting vacant for many years, the building was sold in June 2021 to Albany, Georgia-based developer Pace Burt.

Burt, who has worked on multiple other historic renovation projects in the Southeast, has released plans for the building to be converted into a high-end, multi-family development with under 70 units.
