= Augusta Confederate Monument =

Coordinates: 33°28′29.7″N 81°57′51.7″W

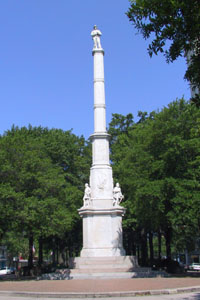
- “In Memoriam No nation rose so white and fair: None fell so pure of crime. Our Confederate Dead”
- Interactive map of Augusta Confederate Monument
- Location: 700 block of Broad Street, Augusta, Georgia

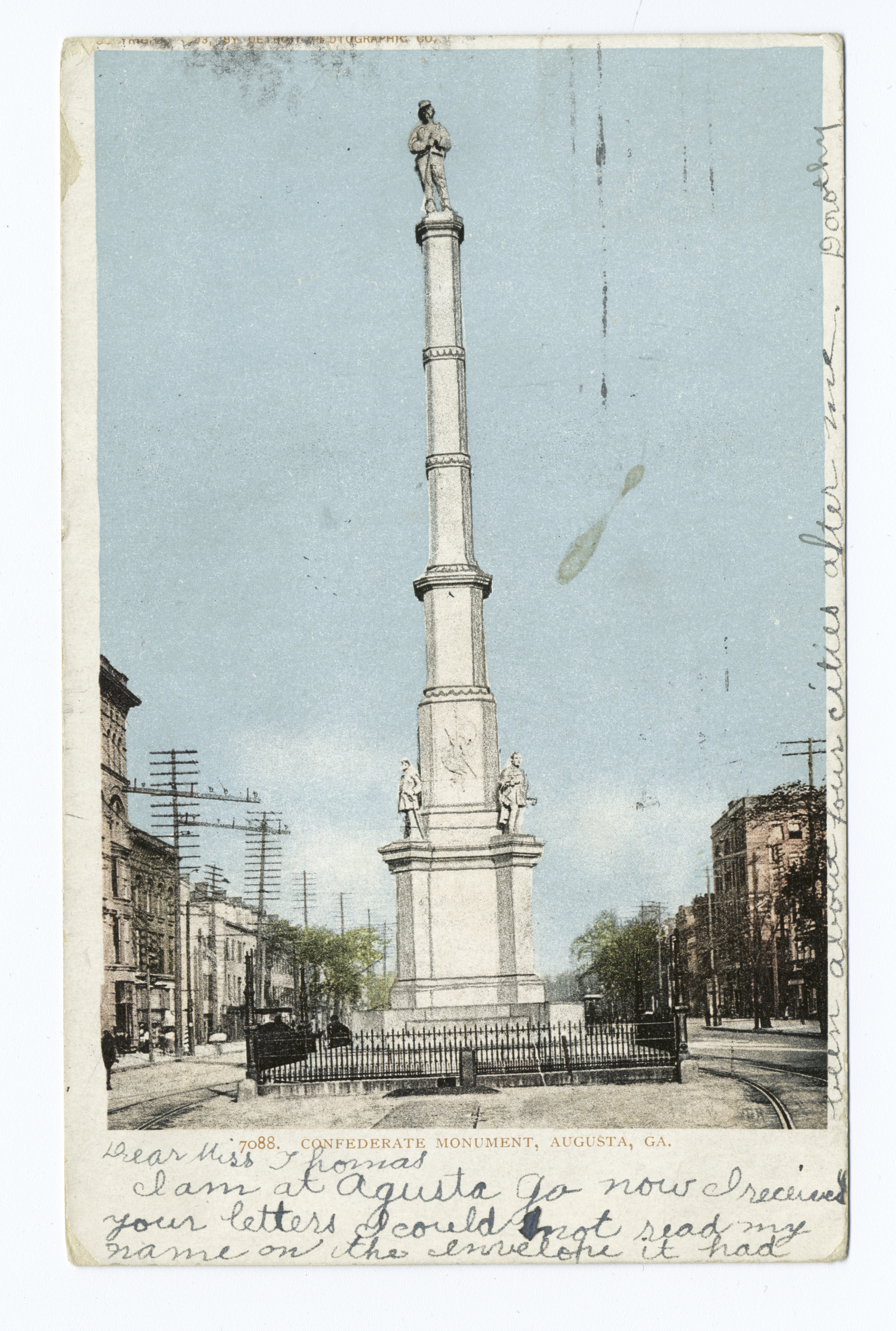

The Augusta Confederate Monument, also known as the Richmond County Confederate Monument, is located in the median of the 700 block of Broad Street in downtown Augusta, Georgia, and is inscribed, in part “In Memoriam 'No nation rose so white and fair: None fell so pure of crime.' Our Confederate Dead.” The monument is seventy-six feet high on a granite base, topped by a shaft of Carrara marble. The monument was commissioned in 1875 by the Ladies Memorial Association of Augusta. It was designed by the architectural firm of VanGruder and Young of Philadelphia, built by the Markwalter firm of Augusta, carved by Antonio Fontana, and dedicated on October 31, 1878.

Around the base of the monument are the life size statues of four Southern generals in the American Civil War: Thomas R. R. Cobb, Stonewall Jackson, Robert E. Lee, and William H. T. Walker.

== Proposed relocation ==
During the summer of 2020, Augusta Mayor Hardie Davis created the Task Force on Confederate Monuments, Street Names and Landmarks.

The eleven member task force – consisting of local historians, educators, descendants of Confederate figures, and community activists – was charged with examining the renaming, relocating, or removal of places in Augusta that honor Confederate military figures.

The panel returned a final report to the Augusta Commission in October 2020 with a recommendation that the monument be relocated to the grounds of either Magnolia Cemetery or Westview Cemetery.

Since the final report has been submitted with the recommended relocation, no action has been taken on the issue. The Georgia Sons of Confederate Veterans along with the Brig.Gen. E.P. Alexander Camp #158 Augusta , Ga. and its members filed a lawsuit against the City of Augusta preventing the removal or re-location of any and all Confederate monuments and placenames.

Georgia’s monument protection law, codified in O.C.G.A. § 50‑3‑1, prohibits destruction, defacement, concealment, and unlawful removal of public or private monuments, with civil and criminal penalties for violations.

== Full inscription ==
Worthy
to have lived and known
our Gratitude:
Worthy
to be hallowed and held
in tender Remembrance:
Worthy
the fadeless Fame which
Confederate soldiers won.
who gave themselves in life
and Death for us:
For the Honor of Georgia.
For the Rights of the States.
For the Liberties of the South.
For the Principles of the Union.
as these were handed down to
them by the Fathers of
Our Common Country.

In Memoriam
"No nation rose so white
and fair:
None fell so pure of crime.

Our
Confederate Dead

Erected
A.D. 1878.
by
the Ladies
Memorial Association
of Augusta.
In honor of the men of
Richmond County.
Who died
in the cause of the
Confederate States.
