= The Augusta Chronicle =

Daily American newspaper

- Type: Daily newspaper
- Format: Broadsheet
- Owner: USA Today Co.
- Publisher: William S. Morris III
- Founded: 1785 (as Augusta Gazette)
- Headquarters: 725 Broad Street; Augusta, GA, 30901; United States
- Circulation: 17,238 Daily; 19,351 Sunday (as of 2018)
- ISSN: 0747-1343
- Website: augustachronicle.com

The Augusta Chronicle is the daily newspaper of Augusta, Georgia, Georgia's oldest active newspaper and one of the oldest newspapers in the United States still in publication. The paper is known for its coverage of the Masters Tournament, which is played in Augusta.

== History ==
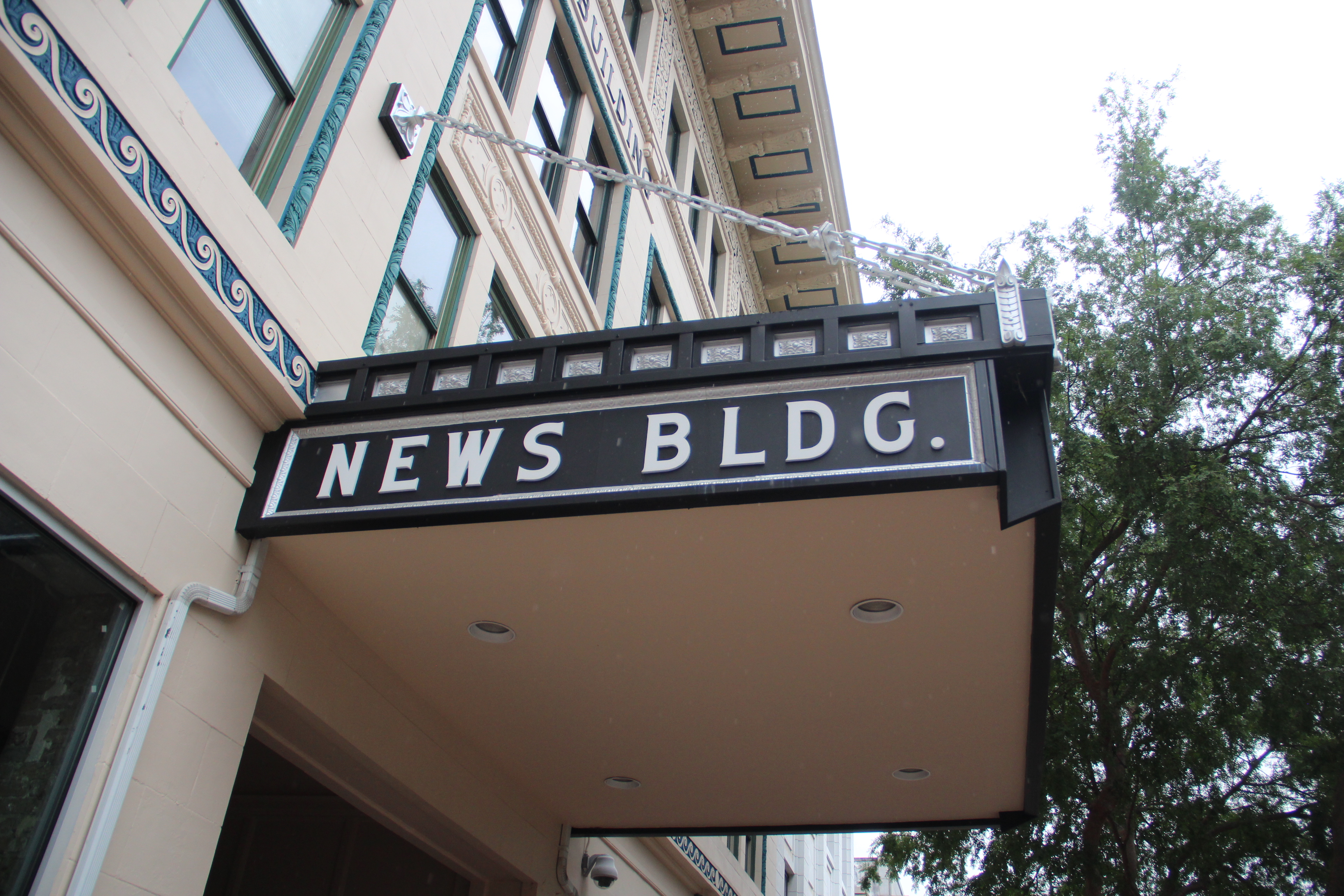
The Augusta Chronicle's headquarters is in the News Building on Broad Street

The paper was founded as the weekly Augusta Gazette in 1785 by Greenburg Hughes. In 1786, Hughes left the paper and John E. Smith took over, renaming the paper The Georgia State Gazette. From 1789 to 1804, the paper was known as The Augusta Chronicle and Gazette of the State. Upon Smith's death in 1803, Dennis Driscol took over the paper and changed its name to the Augusta Chronicle, where it became known for its controversial journalism. A.H. Pemberton published the Chronicle from 1825-1836 where he became one of the first Georgians to call for secession. Other notable editors include Ambrose R. Wright (1873-1899), a former Confederate general; and Patrick Walsh (1873-1899), later mayor of Augusta and a U.S. Senator.

In 1945, former bookkeeper William Morris Jr. bought a controlling interest in the paper. This was the beginning of Morris Communications, headquartered in Augusta with the Chronicle as its flagship.

On 9 August 2017, it was announced that The Augusta Chronicle, along with Morris Communications' entire newspaper division and various periodicals, would be sold to GateHouse Media for $120 million in a deal expected to close on October 2. Stephen Wade and Billy Morris will retain their roles as president and publisher respectively. The Morris family will keep ownership of The Augusta Chronicle building and property in downtown Augusta. The sale ended 232 years of local ownership, the last 72 of which had been under the Morris family.

== Subsidiaries ==
Newspapers published by the Chronicle include The Columbia County News-Times, The Hampton County Guardian, The Jefferson News-Farmer, and the Sylvania Telephone.

== See also ==
- Media in Augusta, Georgia
- List of newspapers in Georgia (U.S. state)
