= List of people from Augusta, Georgia =

The city of Augusta, Georgia, the largest city and the county seat of Richmond County, Georgia, is the birthplace and home of several notable individuals. This is a list of people from Augusta, Georgia and includes people who were born or lived in Augusta for a nontrivial amount of time. Individuals included in this listing are people presumed to be notable because they have received significant coverage in reliable sources that are independent of the subject.

Augusta was first used by Native Americans as a place to cross the Savannah River, because of Augusta's location on the fall line. The city was the second state capital of Georgia from 1785 until 1795 (alternating for a period with Savannah, the first).

== Actors ==
Photo	Name	Notes	References
	Quinton Aaron	Actor (Michael Oher in The Blind Side)	
	Laurence Fishburne	Actor (Morpheus in The Matrix trilogy)	
	Hulk Hogan	Actor, professional wrestler; born in Augusta, raised in Tampa, Florida	
	Kathryn McCormick	Step Up Revolution actress, So You Think You Can Dance contestant/All-Star	
	Butterfly McQueen	Actress (Prissy in Gone with the Wind)	
	Danielle Panabaker	Actress	
	Khary Payton	Actor (Cyborg in Teen Titans, appeared in General Hospital)	
	Faith Prince	Actor	
	Shay Roundtree	Actor (Drumline, Everybody Hates Chris, Kingpin)	
	Catherine Taber	Actress	
	Dub Taylor	Character actor	

== Arts and design ==
Photo	Name	Notes	References
	Joseph Haygood Blodgett	Architect and builder	
	Jasper Johns	Artist	
	Amos Mac	Photographer	
	Jessye Norman	Opera singer	
	Mary Telfair	Art collector, philanthropist	

== Athletics ==
Photo	Name	Notes	References
	William Avery	Professional basketball player	
	Kendrell Bell	Professional football player in the NFL	
	Mike Bobo	Offensive coordinator and quarterbacks coach for the Georgia Bulldogs	
	Emerson Boozer	Former running back for New York Jets	
	Bennie Briscoe	Professional boxer	
	William "Happy Humphrey" Cobb	Professional wrestler	
	Luis Campusano	Catcher for the San Diego Padres	
	William Cunningham	Professional basketball player	
	Chick Donovan	Professional wrestler; born in LaGrange, grew up in Augusta	
	Charles "Chuck" Evans	NFL player for the Baltimore Ravens	
	Vernon Forrest	World champion boxer	
	Bill Fulcher	Coach and NFL player	
	Deon Grant	NFL player (New York Giants)	
	Todd Greene	Baseball player	
	Ray Guy	Retired NFL player	
	Arnold Harrison	Football player, currently with UFL's Virginia Destroyers	
	Charles Howell III	Professional golfer	
	Leroy Irvin	Professional football player	
	Beau Jack	World champion boxer	
	Jimmie Johnson	NFL player, tight ends coach for the Minnesota Vikings	
	Bailie Key	Gymnast, Junior U.S. National Champion 2013	
	Macay McBride	MLB player for Detroit Tigers	
	Taj McWilliams-Franklin	WNBA player (Minnesota Lynx)	
	Larry Mize	Professional golfer; winner of the 1987 Masters Tournament at Augusta National Golf Club	
	Chad Mottola	MLB player for Cincinnati Reds	
	Chase Parker	Golfer on mini-tours, made cut at 2016 U.S. Open	
	Kyle Parker	Quarterback for Clemson University	
	Jamal Reynolds	Defensive end for the Florida State Seminoles and Green Bay Packers	
	Carlos Rogers	Professional football player for San Francisco 49ers	
	Jeff Sanders	Professional basketball player	
	Vaughn Taylor	Professional golfer; member of the United States team in the 2006 Ryder Cup	
	Herschel Walker	Professional football player; won the Heisman Trophy in 1982 and played in the National Football League (NFL) for 12 seasons	
	Ken Whisenhunt	Head coach of Arizona Cardinals	
	Rayonta Whitfield	Professional boxer, former world title challenger	
	Jonathan Williams	Professional football player in CFL	
	Paul Williams	Professional boxer, former WBO welterweight world champion	
	Devonte Upson	Basketball player in the Israeli Basketball Premier League	
	James Webb III	Basketball player in the Israeli Basketball Premier League	

- Robert Turner (born 1993), basketball player for Maccabi Ashdod of the Israeli Basketball Premier League

== Education ==
Photo	Name	Notes	References
	Ignatius Alphonso Few	Methodist clergyman, founder of Emory University	
	John Wesley Gilbert	African-American trailblazer, archaeologist, clergyman	
	John Hope	Educator, founding member of the Niagara Movement	
	Isaac S. Hopkins	Former professor and first president of Georgia Tech	
	David M. Potter	Pulitzer Prize-winning professor at Stanford University	

== Literature and journalism ==
Photo	Name	Notes	References
	Rod Beaton	Sports journalist for USA Today	
	Stephen Vincent Benét	Writer and Pulitzer Prize-winning poet	
	Maria Louise Eve	Poet	
	Elle and Blair Fowler	YouTube beauty gurus and writers	
	Augustus Baldwin Longstreet	Lawyer, Methodist clergyman, and humorist	
	Tom Poland	Author	
	Abram Joseph Ryan	Poet	
	Corbett Thigpen	Psychiatrist; co-author of the internationally popular nonfiction book The Three Faces of Eve	
	Cranston Williams	Newspaperman and publisher	
	Frank Yerby	Novelist	

== African-American pioneers ==
Photo	Name	Notes	References
	Lucy Craft Laney	Opened the first school for black children in Augusta; namesake of Lucy Craft Laney High School and the Lucy Laney Black History Museum	
	Ed McIntyre	First African-American mayor of Augusta	

== Military ==
Photo	Name	Notes	References
	Raymond O. Barton	Major general, US 4th Infantry Division commander on D-Day and Battle of the Hurtgen Forest	
	Archibald Butt	Military aide to U.S. Presidents Roosevelt and Taft; died on the RMS Titanic; namesake of the Butt Memorial Bridge	
	William P. Duvall	U.S. Army major general; retired to Augusta	
	Aquilla James "Jimmie" Dyess	USMC lieutenant colonel, posthumous recipient of the Medal of Honor during World War II; one of only nine known Eagle Scouts to receive the Medal of Honor; the only American to receive both the Carnegie Medal for civilian heroism and the Medal of Honor	
	Lafayette McLaws	Major general of the Confederate Army, American Civil War	
	Montgomery C. Meigs	Quartermaster general of United States Army during the American Civil War	
	Edwin A. Pollock	General, United States Marines	
	George D. Shea	Major general, United States Army	
	Joseph Wheeler	United States Army general in the Spanish–American War	
	James Longstreet	Confederate general of the American Civil War and the principal subordinate to General Robert E. Lee	

== Music ==
Photo	Name	Notes	References
	James Brown	Soul musician, bandleader, songwriter, dancer, and record producer who was a major figure of 20th century music, often referred to as the "Godfather of Soul", in his over 50-year career, influenced the development of several music genres; namesake of James Brown Blvd. and the James Brown Arena	
	Anna Gardner Goodwin	Composer of marches and religious music, born in Augusta	
	Terri Gibbs	Country and western singer	
	Wycliffe Gordon	Jazz trombonist	
	Amy Grant	Singer-songwriter; born in Augusta; her family soon moved to Nashville, Tennessee	
	Ben Hayslip	Country music songwriter; Grammy-nominated; two-time ASCAP Songwriter of the Year; winner of four Triple Play Awards for three number one songs in a 12-month span	
	Dave Haywood	Singer-songwriter; member of popular band Lady A	
	Sharon Jones	Singer	
	Charles Kelley	Singer-songwriter; member of popular band Lady A	
	Josh Kelley	Musician	
	Steve Morse	Guitarist	
	Jessye Norman	Opera singer; namesake of Riverwalk Augusta's Jessye Norman Amphitheatre	

== Politics and government ==
Photo	Name	Notes	References
	Rick Allen	U.S. representative for Georgia	
	Ben Bernanke	Federal Reserve chairman	
	Darrell Blocker	CIA agent, nicknamed "The Spy Whisperer"	
	Alfred Cumming	First governor of Utah territory	
	William H. Fleming	Politician and lawyer	
	James Myles Hinton	Civil rights leader, NAACP leader, businessperson, minister	
	Craig James	Politician	
	Seaborn Jones	U.S. representative for Georgia	
	Austin Scott	U.S. representative for Georgia	
	George Walton	Signer of the United States Declaration of Independence	
	Ansley Wilcox	Lawyer and civil service commissioner	
	Woodrow Wilson	Twenty-eighth president of the United States	

== Radio and television personalities ==
Photo	Name	Notes	References
	Dan Miller	Journalist, TV personality	
	Judy Woodruff	Television news anchor and journalist	

== Science and technology ==
Photo	Name	Notes	References
	Hervey M. Cleckley	Psychiatrist	
	Roland A. Steiner	Archaeologist	
	Susan Still Kilrain	Retired United States Naval officer and NASA astronaut	

== See also ==
- List of mayors of Augusta, Georgia
