= Perry M. Smith =

United States Air Force general

Perry Smith
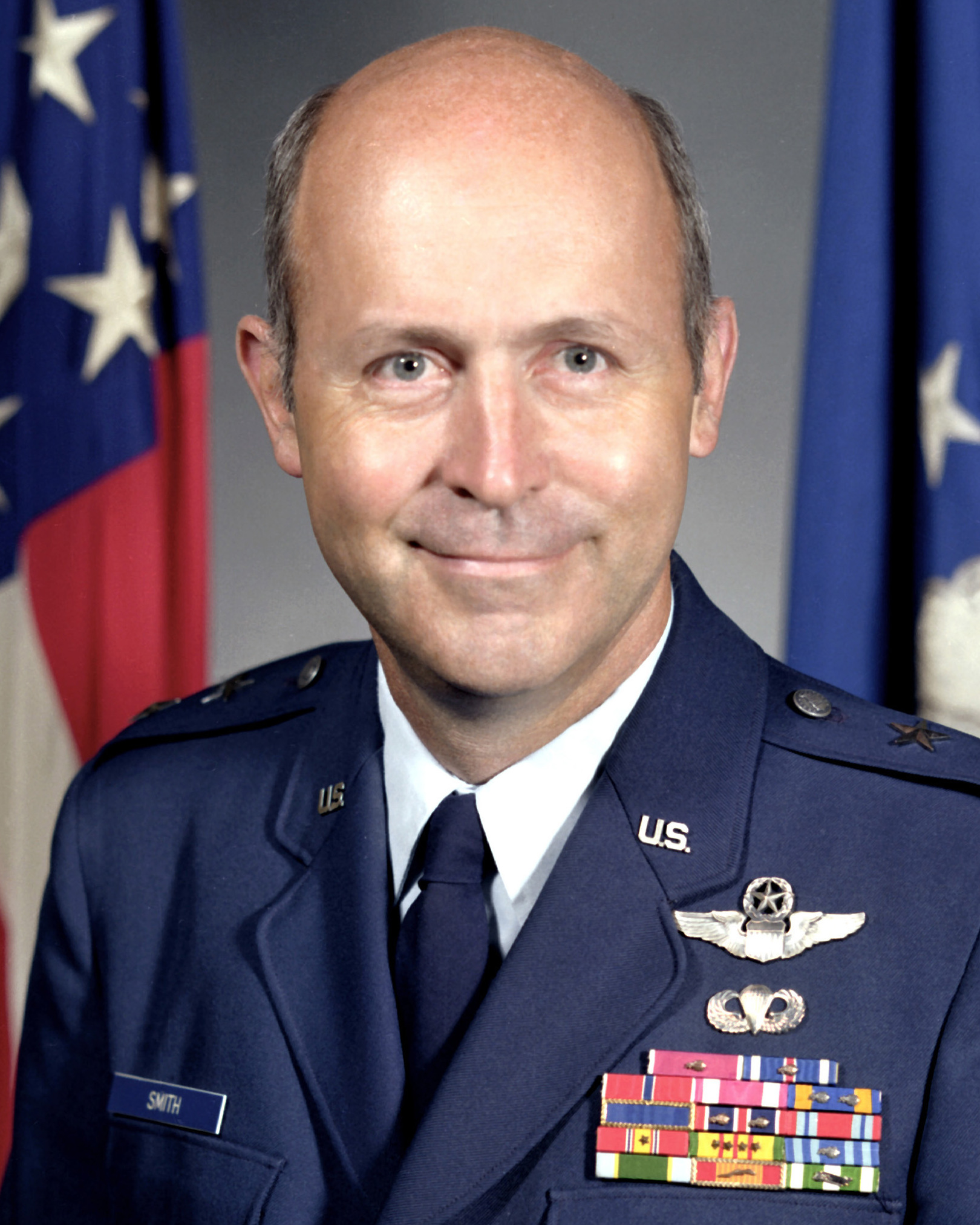
- Born: December 16, 1934 (age 91); West Point, New York, U.S.
- Allegiance: United States
- Branch: United States Air Force
- Service years: 1956–1986
- Rank: Major General
- Conflicts: Vietnam War
- Awards: Defense Superior Service Medal; Legion of Merit (2); Distinguished Flying Cross (2); Bronze Star Medal; Meritorious Service Medal; Air Medal (11)

Perry McCoy Smith Jr. (born December 16, 1934, in West Point, N.Y.) is a retired United States Air Force major general. He is a teacher, author and TV and radio commentator. Smith was born at West Point into a military family and travelled extensively throughout his youth. His family was stationed in Hawaii when he was six years old. On the morning of December 7, 1941 he was riding in the back of an Army truck on his way to Sunday school. He watched as the attack on Pearl Harbor took place.

He lived in Italy following World War II, where his father served in the British-American military government of Italy. He attended twelve different schools in the U.S. and overseas and graduated in 1952 from Highland Falls High School in New York. He attended the United States Military Academy at West Point (USMA) following high school. Smith played intercollegiate lacrosse and was named as a member of the second team All American lacrosse team. Smith graduated from West Point in 1956. Smith went on to earn his Ph.D. in international relations from Columbia University in 1967. He also graduated from the National War College in 1971.

== Military career ==
Smith is a retired major general who served for 30 years in the United States Air Force. Much of his military career was spent as a pilot in fighter aircraft. Smith flew 180 combat missions over Laos and North Vietnam during the Vietnam War. He commanded the F-15 equipped 36th Tactical Fighter Wing, served as the top Air Force Planner and was commandant of the National War College from 1983 to 1986.

== Post-military ==
Smith settled in Augusta, Georgia in 1990. Since then, he has been active in many community activities including raising funds for Saint Paul's Church, the Fisher House, the Kroc Center, the Boy Scouts, the Heritage Academy and the Augusta Museum of History.

From 1991 to 1998 he served as a military analyst for CNN. He resigned as analyst in protest over CNN's 1998 nerve gas special "Valley of Death" which claimed sarin nerve gas had been used by U.S. forces during Operation Tailwind.

After Smith's departure from CNN, he served on contract with NBC, MSNBC, CBS TV and CBS radio.

Smith was a board member of the Augusta Kiwanis Club, and a successful recruiter of new members.

Smith currently serves as president emeritus of the board of trustees for the Augusta Museum of History.

Smith was a frequent op-ed contributor to the Augusta Chronicle.

Smith is frequently an op-ed contributor to the Augusta Business Daily.

== Personal life ==
Smith is the son of Perry McCoy Smith Sr. and Mary Emily (Porter) Smith. His father was a 1922 West Point graduate who retired from the Army in 1954 as a colonel.

Smith is married to Connor Cleckley Dyess. Dyess is the daughter of Lieutenant Colonel Jimmie Dyess. Jimmie Dyess, a United States Marine, was the only person to earn America's two highest awards for heroism, the Medal of Honor and the Carnegie Medal.

Smith and his wife have two children and four grandchildren. A good deal of Smith's time is spent teaching and mentoring corporate executives, MBA scholars, government and military leaders, church groups and non-profit organizations. Topics Smith covers include leadership, ethics, strategic planning, heroism, innovation and dealing with the media. He was an enrichment speaker for Crystal Cruises for 20 years. Smith has lived all over the world including Thailand, Germany, France, Italy and Turkey. His travels have taken him to more than one hundred nations across the globe.

== Awards and honors ==
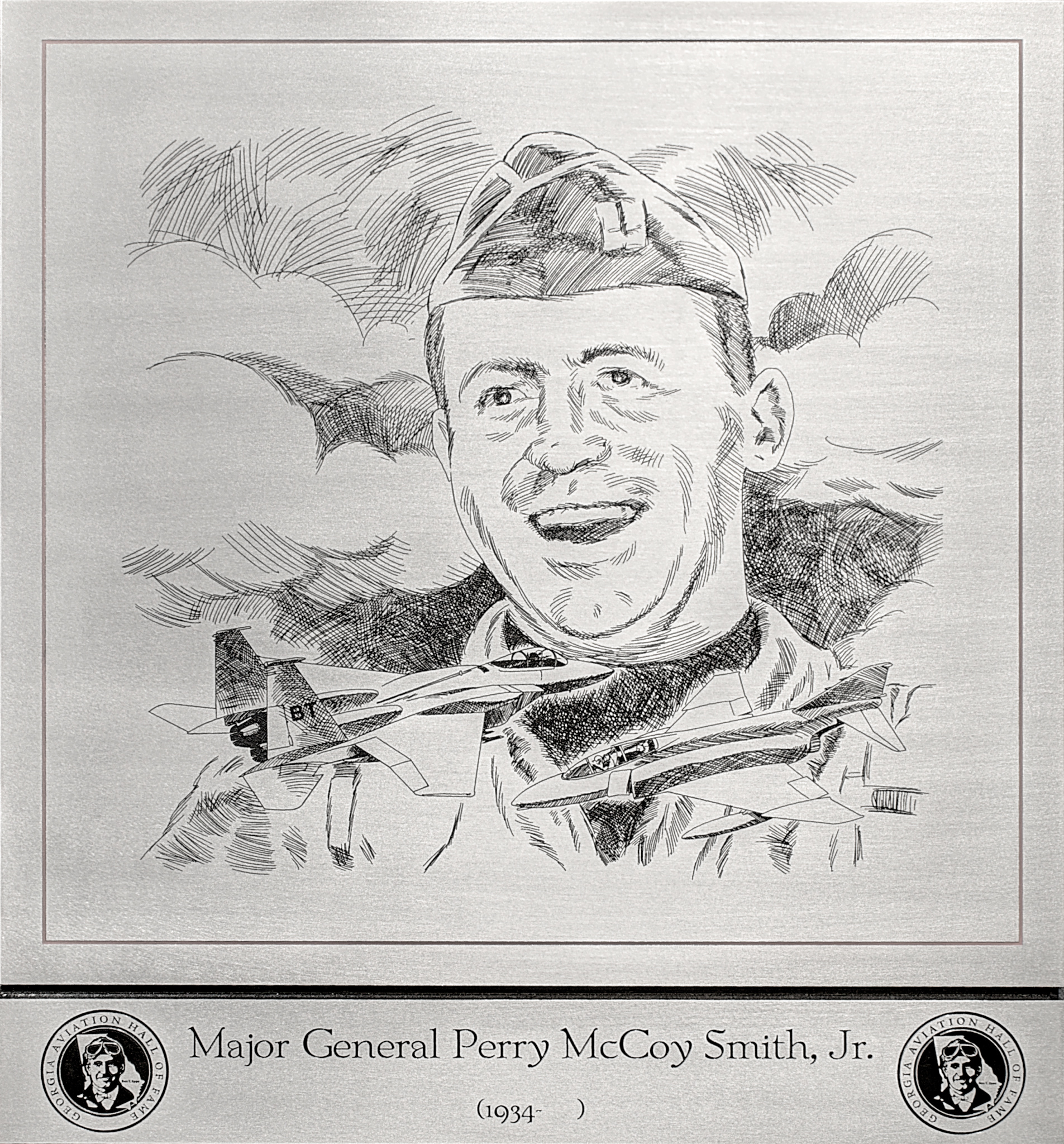
Plaque of Smith at the Georgia Aviation Hall of Fame

In 1968, Smith's dissertation, Wartime Planning for Postwar Contingencies: The Army Air Force Example, 1943-1956, earned the Helen Dwight Reid award from the American Political Science Association. In 2011, the General Perry Smith Parkway in Augusta, GA was dedicated in honor of Smith. The parkway will provide access to a new industrial park which will be in close proximity to the Augusta Regional Airport.

Smith was honored with a special section of the Augusta Museum of History (located in Augusta, GA) being named for him.

Smith was presented with the George Barrett Award in recognition of his leadership by the Augusta Kiwanis Club.

In 1992, Smith received an honorary Doctorate from Marietta College

The Georgia Aviation Hall of Fame inducted Smith in 2021.

== Author ==
Smith has written seven books, including Assignment Pentagon, Rules and Tools for Leaders (last edition updated with co-author, Gen. Jeffrey Foley) and A Hero among Heroes: Jimmie Dyess and the 4th Marine Division. In June 2015 Smith released an updated version of his Dyess book entitled "Courage, Compassion, Marine: The Unique Story of Jimmie Dyess."

Smith assisted in the editing and marketing of the book, Medal of Honor, by Peter Collier. This best selling book profiles the remarkable life stories of living Medal of Honor recipients. The book originally included a 90-minute DVD narrated by Brian Williams. The 3rd edition of this book was published in October, 2011. It contains the life stories of recipients from World War II to the war on terror. In 2021 he self-published his memoir, Listen Up: Stories from Pearl Harbor, Vietnam, the Pentagon, CNN and Beyond.
