= Academy of Richmond County =

Public high school in Augusta, Georgia, United States

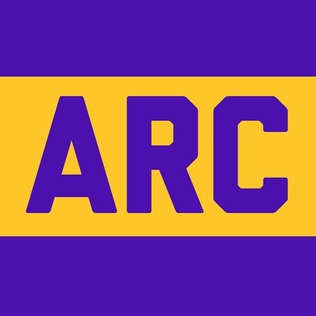

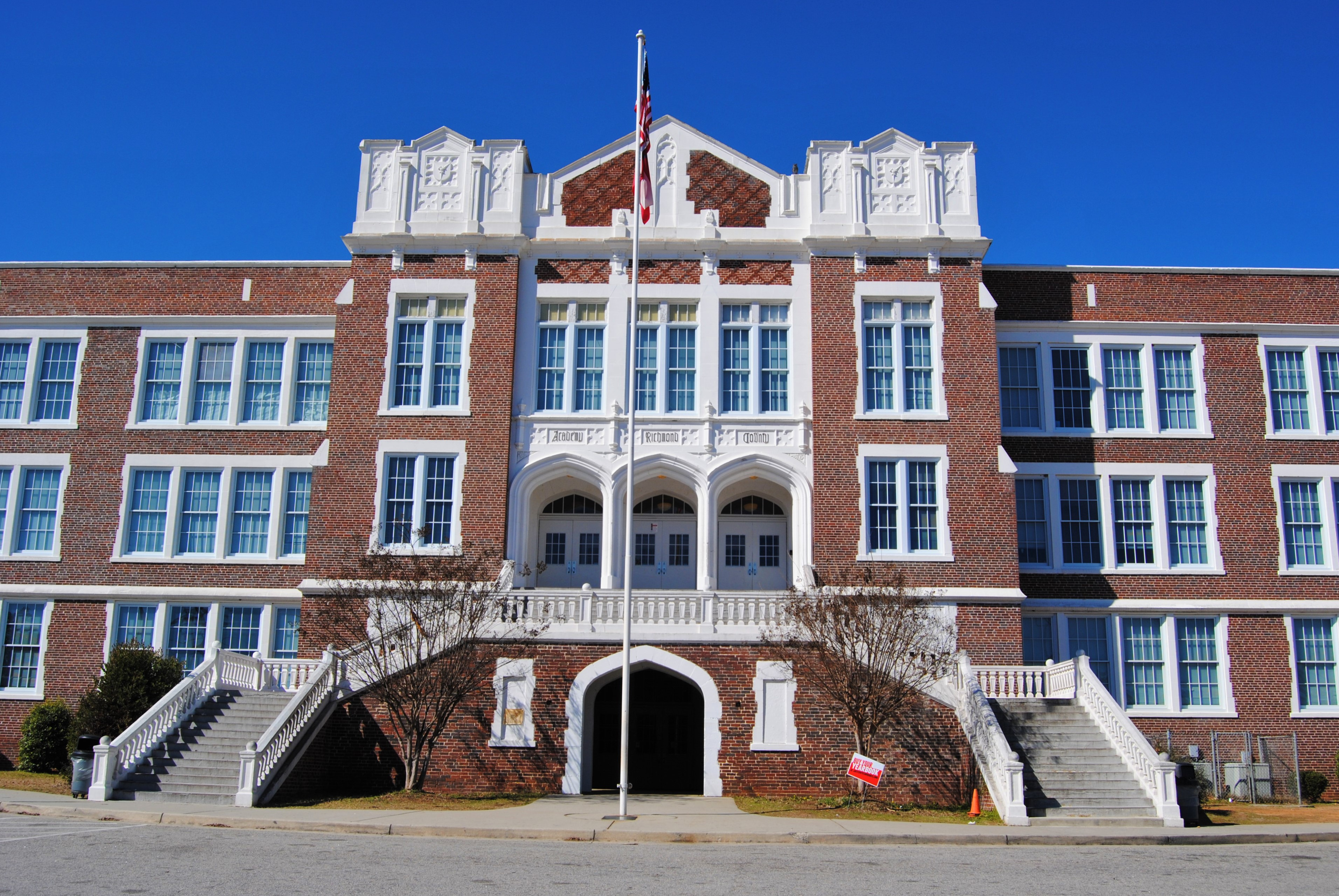
- The front entrance to current high school building built in 1926

Location
- 910 Russell Street; Augusta, Georgia 30904; United States

Information
- Type: Public
- Established: 1783; 243 years ago
- School board: 1st District
- School district: Richmond County School System
- Principal: Travis Wiggins
- Teaching staff: 65.60 (FTE)
- Grades: 9–12
- Enrollment: 1,178 (2024–2025)
- Student to teacher ratio: 17.96
- Campus type: Urban
- Colors: Purple and gold
- Mascot: Musketeer
- Feeder schools: All Richmond county public schools
- Website: Academy of Richmond County
- Academy of Richmond County-1926 Campus
- U.S. National Register of Historic Places
- Coordinates: 33.4740°N 82.0054°W
- Built: 1926
- Architect: Philander P. Scoggs, Whitley L. Ewing
- Architectural style: Collegiate Gothic
- NRHP reference No.: 03001491
- Added to NRHP: January 28, 2004
- Old Academy of Richmond County
- U.S. National Register of Historic Places
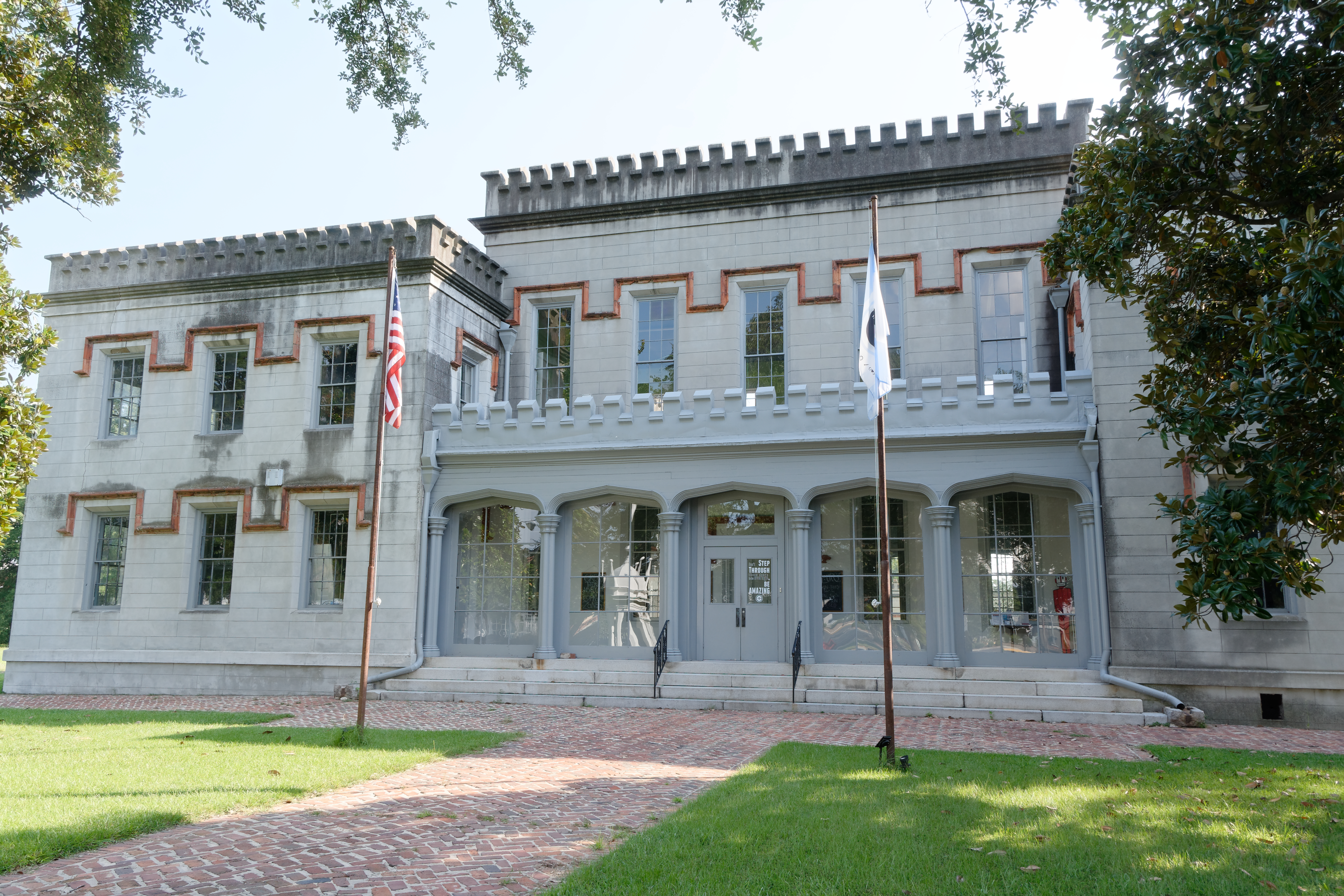
- One of the previous Academy buildings built in 1857
- Location: 540 Telfair St.
- Coordinates: 33.4700°N 81.9623°W
- Area: less than one acre
- Built: 1857
- Architect: William Henry Goodrich
- Architectural style: Gothic Revival
- NRHP reference No.: 73000639
- Added to NRHP: April 11, 1973

The Academy of Richmond County is a high school located in Augusta, Georgia, United States. Known previously as Richmond County Military Academy, it is commonly known as Richmond Academy or ARC.

Chartered in 1783, it is listed as the fifth oldest existing public high school in the United States, and the oldest existing public high school in the Southern United States.

Richmond Academy is located at the edge of the Summerville historic district of Augusta.

== History ==
The school was initially an all-male private institution, as were most high schools in the 1700s. After the American Civil War, it was adapted as a military school. During the last half of the 20th century, Richmond Academy transitioned into a co-educational, traditional public high school. It has maintained a strong military Junior Reserve Officer Training Corps that is available, but not mandatory, for participation by students. Both the 1857, and the present 1926, Richmond Academy buildings are listed on the National Register of Historic Places.

President George Washington delivered the commencement address at the graduation ceremonies at ARC in 1791.

In 1926, the academy moved to its present-day building on Walton Way. Principal Major George Butler described the school in 1927 as "second to none in the South in terms of facility." The 1926 building was designed in Gothic-style architecture.

Up until the 1950s, ARC was for white males only. The 1951–1957 Richmond Academy boys' baseball team was ranked as one of the top 10 Georgia state sports dynasties. It has teams in many sports.

During the 1950s the school became coeducational, admitting female students. In 1964, the school began to admit minorities and became desegregated.

== Contemporary Richmond Academy ==
=== Academics ===
The Academy of Richmond County has 1,178 students in grades 9 through 12, with a student to faculty ratio of 16:1. It offers numerous Advanced Placement courses, has a GATE (gifted and talented education) program, and an International Baccalaureate Programme course of study that was added to the school in July 2003. It is for its highly motivated, college preparatory students. ARC is one of three schools in the Central Savannah River Area that offers an IB program.

The Mathematics Team won the 2005 National Society of Black Engineers Try-Math-A-Thon, which was held in Boston.

=== Athletics ===
The school mascot is a Musketeer, and the school colors are purple and gold. The original school mascot was a bearcat.

The 1957 Varsity Baseball Team was named National Champions by MaxPreps.com. The 1952 and 1953 squads were honorable mentions.

== Alumni ==
- Edward J. Black
- John Sanford Cohen
- William H. Crawford
- Pat Dye
- Bill Fulcher
- Johnson Hagood (governor)
- James U. Jackson
- John K. Jackson
- Jimmy Lester
- Peter Pund
- John Small (American football)
- Pleasant A. Stovall
- Leroy Suddath
- Robert Symms
- Forrest Towns
- William H. T. Walker

Name	Class year	Notability	Reference(s)
Doug Barnard Jr.	1939	Democratic member of the United States House of Representatives	
Dudley Hollingsworth Bowen Jr.	1959	United States federal judge	
Lloyd D. Brown	1908	United States Army Major General	
Hervey M. Cleckley	1921	Psychiatrist; professor, author, and pioneer in the psychopathy field	
Aquilla J. Dyess	n.d.	Medal of Honor recipient in World War II	
Jack Fisher	1957	Professional baseball player (Baltimore Orioles, San Francisco Giants, New York Mets, Chicago White Sox, Cincinnati Reds)	
William Henry Fleming	n.d.	Lawyer and politician, Member of the United States House of Representatives	
William Dudley Geer	1941	First Dean of the School of Business at Samford University	
Phil Gingrey	n.d.	Obstetrician and a Republican member of the United States House of Representatives	
Isaac S. Hopkins	n.d.	First president of the Georgia Institute of Technology	
Frank M. Hull	1966	Lawyer and U.S. Court of Appeals judge	
Susan Still Kilrain	n.d.	NASA astronaut	
John Pendleton King	1818	United States Senator	
Joseph R. Lamar	n.d.	United States Supreme Court Justice	
James Longstreet	1837	Confederate general of the American Civil War; post-war he commanded a force including African-American militia troops against a white supremacist paramilitary organization	
Ray Mercer	1979	WBO world heavyweight champion	
Dan Miller	1959	Journalist, television personality, featured nationally on CBS's The Pat Sajak Show and the Nashville Network	
Steve Morse	n.d.	Guitarist (left after 10th grade)	
David M. Potter	1928	Pulitzer Prize-winning history professor, holding professorships including at Stanford University, Yale University, and Oxford University	
Carl Sanders	1942	Governor of Georgia and lawyer; named partner of Troutman Sanders, an international law firm (later Troutman Pepper Hamilton Sanders)	
George D. Shea	1914	U.S. Army major general	
Andy West	grad. date unknown	Bassist and composer, a founding member of the Dixie Dregs	
Ken Whisenhunt	1980	NFL head coach and player of Tennessee Titans	
Jim Whitehead	1960	Republican politician	
Judy Woodruff	1964	Television news anchor, journalist, and writer; has worked at CNN, NBC News, and PBS; board member of the International Women's Media Foundation; member of the Council on Foreign Relations	

== Faculty ==
- Wilfred T. Neill
- Charles Tait (politician)

== See also ==
- History of Augusta, Georgia
- List of people from Augusta, Georgia
