= Dyess =

Dyess may refer to:

- Dyess (surname)
- Dyess, Arkansas
- Dyess Air Force Base, Texas
- USS Dyess (DD-880), a U.S. naval destroyer
