= List of Clemson University alumni =

This is a list of notable alumni that have graduated from Clemson University.

== Arts, entertainment, and media ==
- Harry Ashmore, journalist, received Pulitzer Prize for Public Service in 1958
- Lee Brice, country music singer
- Aaron Buerge, The Bachelor, Season 2
- Daja Dial, Miss South Carolina 2015
- James Dickey, writer and poet with American South influences (attended for one year, but did not graduate from Clemson)
- Meredith Hayden, chef, social media influencer, and cookbook author (BS in Marketing)
- Jonathan Hickman, comic book writer and artist
- Rob Huebel, actor/comedian, Human Giant
- Fiona Hutchison, One Life to Live actress
- Ian, rapper
- Matt William Knowles, actor, Asura
- Connie LeGrand, former co-host of Speed Channel's Speed News (now The Speed Report)
- Chris Luca, winner of Amazing Race 2
- Nancy O'Dell, former Miss South Carolina and host of Entertainment Tonight'
- Jane Robelot, CBS national news anchor
- Ben Robertson, 1923, World War II correspondent, author
- Ali Rogers, 2014, former Miss South Carolina, 1st runner-up at Miss America 2013
- Mark Tremonti, lead guitarist for Creed, Alter Bridge, and his own band, Tremonti; named Guitarist of the Year three consecutive years by Guitar World, multiple Grammy Awards (did not graduate, attended Clemson his freshman year)
- James Michael Tyler, actor, played Gunther on Friends
- Shawn Weatherly, Miss Universe, 1980–81
- Nora Sakavic, author, wrote the book series All For The Game, set at the fictional Palmetto State University based on Clemson University

== Business and industry ==
- Robert H. Brooks, founder and chairman of Naturally Fresh Dressings, Sauces and Dips; president of Atlanta-based Hooters of America, Inc
- Aaron Buerge, banker
- Charlene Corley, former defense contractor who was convicted in 2007 on two counts of conspiracy
- Richard C. Davis, founder of Trademark Properties, appeared in the first season of A&E's Flip This House
- James M. Henderson, founder of the Henderson Agency, a leading advertising company
- Matt Jordan, former Houston Dynamo general manager and technical director
- Mohnish Pabrai, Indian-American businessman, investor, and philanthropist
- Mark Richardson, co-owner of the Carolina Panthers; owner of 50 Bojangles locations
- Jamey Rootes, president of the Houston Texans and former president of Columbus Crew of the MLS
- George H. Ross, executive vice president and senior counsel of the Trump Organization; advisor to Donald Trump on the NBC reality television program The Apprentice
- Jaw Shaw-kong, owner of Broadcasting Corporation of China and politician in Taiwan
- Paul Steelman, founder of Steelman Partners and architect known for designing casinos and entertainment venues, including the Sands Macao
- David A. Wright, chair of Nuclear Regulatory Commission and former president of National Association of Regulatory Utility Commissioners

== Academia ==
- Autar Kaw, professor at University of South Florida, 2012 U.S. Professor of the Year (administered by CASE and Carnegie Foundation for the Advancement of Teaching)

== Government and politics ==
- Chrissy Adams, lawyer, the tenth judicial circuit solicitor in South Carolina
- David Beasley, governor of South Carolina (1995–1999)
- Charlie Blackwell-Thompson, NASA launch director
- James F. Byrnes, former U.S. secretary of state (1945–1947), former U.S. senator (1931–1941), former associate justice of the Supreme Court of the United States (1941–1942)
- West Cox, member of the South Carolina House of Representatives
- Jim DeMint, former South Carolina senator and president of Heritage Foundation
- Jeff Duncan, U.S. representative for South Carolina's 3rd congressional district
- John Edwards, candidate for vice president in 2004 and senator for North Carolina
- Ekwee Ethuro, speaker of the Kenyan Senate
- Harvey Gantt, former mayor of Charlotte and first African-American graduate of Clemson University
- Thomas S. Gettys, US congressman from South Carolina's 5th District
- Nikki Haley, U.S. permanent representative to the United Nations, former governor of South Carolina
- Mark Hammond, South Carolina secretary of state
- Dick Harpootlian, former SC Democratic Party chair and lawyer for Alex Murdaugh
- Jennifer Homendy, chair of National Transportation Safety Board
- Jo Jorgensen, Libertarian Party candidate for president in 2020
- Kristie A. Kenney, former United States ambassador to the Royal Kingdom of Thailand, The Philippines, and Ecuador
- C. Alan Lawson, justice on Supreme Court of Florida
- Earle Morris, Jr., former lt. governor, comptroller general of South Carolina
- Bob Peeler, South Carolina lieutenant governor (1995–2003)
- Harvey S. Peeler, Jr., Republican member of the South Carolina Senate since 1980
- James P. Richards, US congressman from South Carolina's 5th District
- Jaw Shaw-kong, former member of the Legislative Yuan of Taiwan, founder of Taiwan's New Party
- Strom Thurmond, former governor of South Carolina, former U.S. senator
- David Wilkins, former speaker of South Carolina House, former U.S. ambassador to Canada

== Military ==
- Rudolf Anderson Jr., major in the United States Air Force, the only combat casualty of the Cuban Missile Crisis when his U-2 spy plane was shot down
- Aquilla J. Dyess, United States Marine Corps lieutenant colonel, Medal of Honor recipient, killed in action in World War II, only American to receive both the Carnegie Medal for civilian heroism and the Medal of Honor
- Gary Evans Foster, United States Army (South Carolina National Guard) sergeant, Medal of Honor recipient in World War I
- Randolph W. House, US Army lieutenant general
- John W. Raymond, United States Air Force general; first chief of Space Operations, United States Space Force
- Daniel Augustus Joseph Sullivan, United States Navy ensign, Medal of Honor recipient in World War I

== Sports ==
=== Baseball ===
- Jeff Baker, Texas Rangers utility player
- Kris Benson, former MLB pitcher, 1996 Dick Howser Trophy winner
- Ty Cline, former MLB outfielder and first baseman with several teams
- Tyler Colvin, San Francisco Giants outfielder
- Steven Duggar (born 1993), outfielder for the San Francisco Giants
- Khalil Greene, former MLB infielder with the San Diego Padres and St. Louis Cardinals, 2002 Golden Spikes Award winner
- Steven Jackson, Pittsburgh Pirates relief pitcher
- Jimmy Key, former MLB pitcher with Toronto Blue Jays, New York Yankees, and Baltimore Orioles, four-time All-Star, two-time World Series Champion
- Brian Kowitz, former MLB outfielder with the Atlanta Braves
- Tyler Krieger, second baseman in the Cleveland Indians organization
- Matthew LeCroy, former MLB infielder
- Billy McMillon, former MLB outfielder with the Florida Marlins (1996–1997), Philadelphia Phillies (1997), Detroit Tigers (2000–2001) and Oakland Athletics (2001, 2003–2004); current manager of the Salem Red Sox of the Class A Carolina League, an affiliate of the Boston Red Sox; member of Clemson Hall of Fame, 2012
- Brad Miller, Philadelphia Phillies infielder
- Kyle Parker, outfielder, Colorado Rockies; also played football at Clemson
- Ben Paulsen, Utility player, Colorado Rockies; Currently on Clemson Baseball Staff
- Danny Sheaffer, former MLB catcher/third baseman
- Bill Spiers, former MLB infielder with the Milwaukee Brewers, New York Mets, and Houston Astros
- Tim Teufel, former MLB second baseman, 1986 World Series Champion, current third base coach with the New York Mets
- Spencer Strider, star pitcher for the Atlanta Braves and MLB All-Star in 2023; drafted in the 4th round in 2020 MLB draft

=== Basketball ===
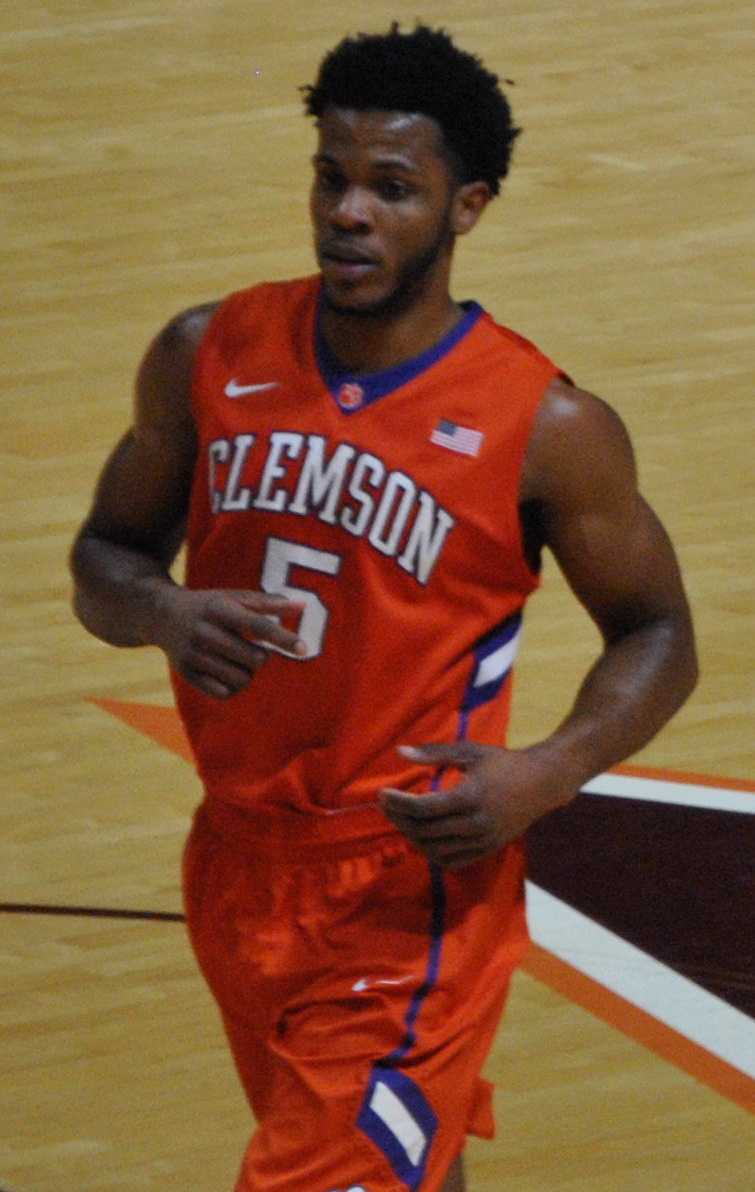
Jaron Blossomgame in 2016

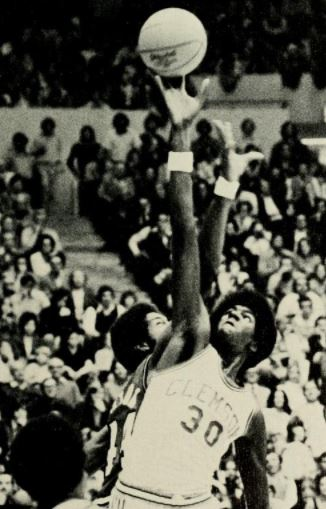
Tree Rollins in '74-75 season

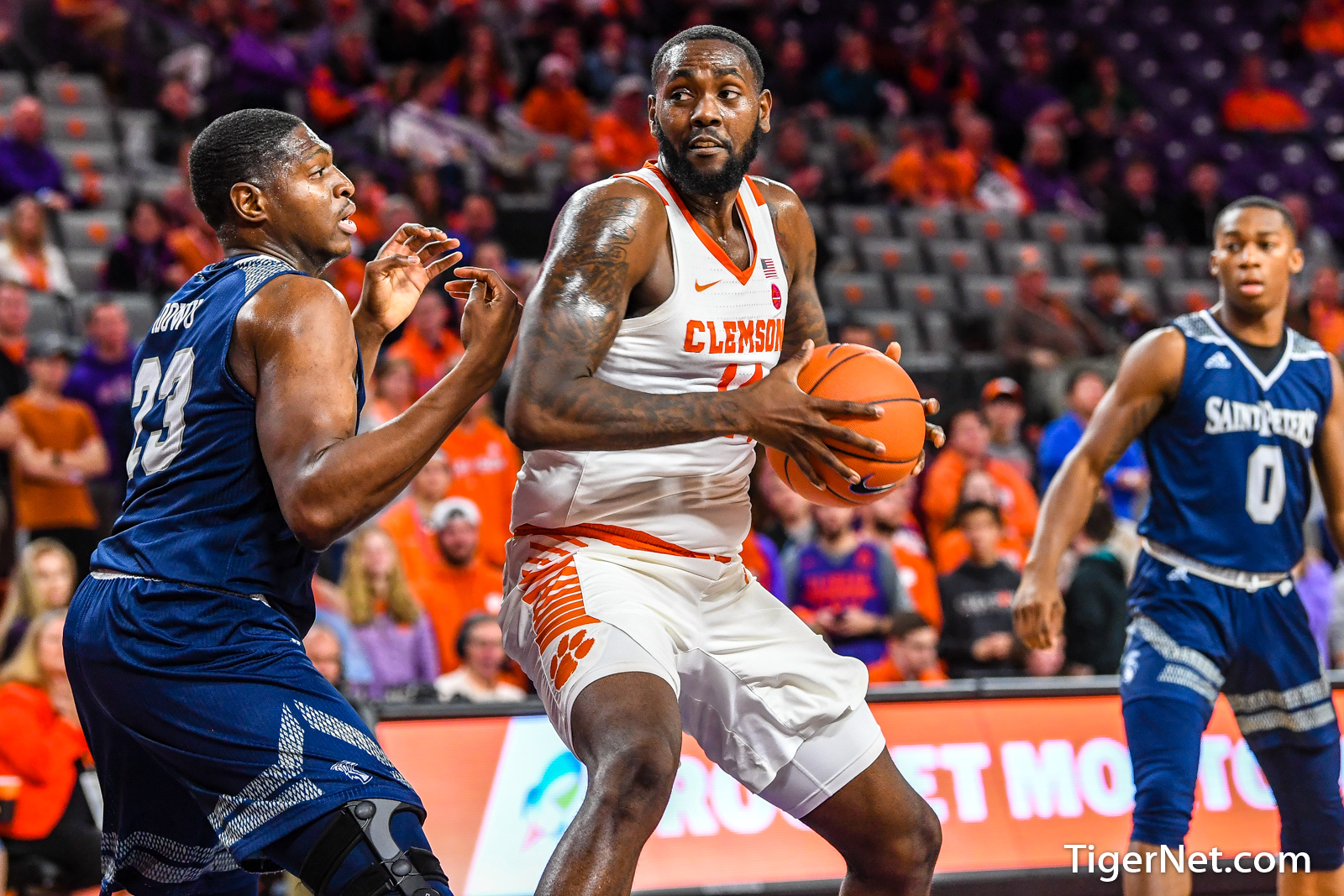
Elijah Thomas in 2018

- Jaron Blossomgame, NBA player for the San Antonio Spurs, basketball player in the Israeli Basketball Premier League
- Trevor Booker, current NBA forward for the Brooklyn Nets, drafted 23rd overall in the 2010 NBA draft
- Greg Buckner, former NBA guard
- Elden Campbell, former NBA forward/center, drafted 27th overall in the 1990 NBA draft
- Dale Davis, former NBA forward/center, All-Star (2000), drafted 13th overall in the 1991 NBA draft
- Horace Grant, former NBA forward, All-Star (1994), four-time NBA Champion, ACC Player of the Year (1987), drafted 10th overall in the 1987 NBA draft
- Cliff Hammonds, current guard for s.Oliver Würzburg
- Randolph Mahaffey, former NBA guard, All-Star (1968)
- K.J. McDaniels, current NBA forward for the Houston Rockets, first team All-ACC and ACC Defensive Player of the Year (2014), drafted 32nd overall in the 2014 NBA draft
- Larry Nance, former NBA forward, three-time NBA All-Star (1985, 1989, 1993), first winner of NBA "slam dunk" competition (1984), NBA All-Defense First Team (1989), drafted 20th overall in the 1981 NBA draft
- Wayne "Tree" Rollins, former NBA player and executive, NBA All-Defense First Team (1984), drafted 14th overall in the 1977 NBA draft
- Will Solomon (born 1978), basketball player
- Elijah Thomas (born 1996), basketball player for Bnei Herzliya in the Israeli Basketball Premier League
- Itoro Umoh-Coleman, former WNBA player
- Chris Whitney, former NBA guard
- Sharone Wright, former NBA forward/center, drafted sixth overall in the 1994 NBA draft

=== Football ===
Players in the 2014 National Football League season; years played at Clemson are in parentheses:

- Dwayne Allen (2009–2011), tight end for the Indianapolis Colts
- Da'Quan Bowers (2008–2010), defensive end
- Andre Branch (2008–2011), defensive end for the Jacksonville Jaguars
- Bashaud Breeland (2011–2013), cornerback for the Washington Redskins
- Jaron Brown (2009–2012), wide receiver for the Arizona Cardinals
- Martavis Bryant (2011–2013), wide receiver for the Pittsburgh Steelers
- Chandler Catanzaro (2010–2013), kicker for the Arizona Cardinals
- Kavell Conner (2006–2009), linebacker for the San Diego Chargers
- Andre Ellington (2009–2012), running back for the Arizona Cardinals
- Dalton Freeman (2009–2012), center for the New York Jets
- Marcus Gilchrist (2007–2010), defensive back for the Oakland Raiders
- Malliciah Goodman (2009–2012), defensive end for the Atlanta Falcons
- Chris Hairston (2007–2010), offensive lineman for the San Diego Chargers
- DeAndre Hopkins (2010–2012), wide receiver for the Arizona Cardinals
- Adam Humphries (2011–2015), wide receiver for the Tampa Bay Buccaneers
- Jarvis Jenkins (2007–2010), defensive tackle for the Chicago Bears
- Trevor Lawrence (2018–2020), quarterback for the Jacksonville Jaguars
- Byron Maxwell (2007–2010), cornerback for the Philadelphia Eagles
- Antoine McClain (2009–2012), offensive lineman for the Arizona Cardinals
- Jonathan Meeks (2009–2012), safety for the Buffalo Bills
- Michael Palmer (2006–2009), tight end for the Pittsburgh Steelers
- Artavis Scott, wide receiver for the Los Angeles Chargers
- Coty Sensabaugh (2008–2011), cornerback for the Tennessee Titans
- Tyler Shatley (2010–2013), offensive guard for the Jacksonville Jaguars
- C. J. Spiller (2006–2009), running back for the New Orleans Saints, unanimous first-team All-American (2009), ACC Player of the Year (2009), drafted ninth overall in the 2010 NFL draft, Pro Bowl (2012)
- Brandon Thomas (2010–2013), offensive tackle for the San Francisco 49ers
- Brandon Thompson (2008–2011), defensive tackle for the Cincinnati Bengals
- Sammy Watkins (2011–2013), wide receiver for the Buffalo Bills, drafted fourth overall in the 2014 NFL draft
- Deshaun Watson (2014–2016), quarterback for the Cleveland Browns, drafted 12th overall in the 2017 NFL draft
- Charlie Whitehurst (2002–2005), quarterback for the Tennessee Titans, previously with the San Diego Chargers and Seattle Seahawks
- Mike Williams, wide receiver for the Los Angeles Chargers, drafted 7th in the 2017 NFL draft

Former players of note:

- Gaines Adams, former NFL defensive end for the Tampa Bay Buccaneers and the Chicago Bears, drafted fourth overall in the 2007 NFL draft
- Keith Adams, former NFL linebacker, two-time NCAA first-team All-American (1999, 2000)
- Terry Allen, former NFL running back, #20 All-time leading rusher in NFL history
- Obed Ariri, former NFL placekicker, NCAA first-team All-American (1980)
- Thomas Austin
- Jeff Bostic, former Washington Redskins center, only player in Clemson history to be a three-time Super Bowl Champion
- Tajh Boyd, quarterback, 2012 ACC Player of the Year, two-time first-team All-ACC (2011, 2012), school records for passing yards (11,904) and passing touchdowns (107)
- Brentson Buckner, former NFL defensive tackle
- Jim Bundren, former NFL player
- Jerry Butler, former Buffalo Bills wide receiver, currently Director of Player Development for the Cleveland Browns
- Dwight Clark, former San Francisco 49ers wide receiver, two-time Pro Bowler, two-time All-Pro, two-time Super Bowl Champion
- Fred Cone, former NFL fullback and kicker for the Green Bay Packers and the Dallas Cowboys
- Airese Currie, former Chicago Bears wide receiver
- Woodrow Dantzler, former NFL running back for the Dallas Cowboys and the Atlanta Falcons, played quarterback at Clemson
- James Davis, former running back for the Cleveland Browns
- Jeff Davis, former NFL Linebacker, NCAA first-team All-American (1981)
- Brian Dawkins, former NFL defensive back for the Philadelphia Eagles and the Denver Broncos, nine-time Pro Bowler, six-time All-Pro, Pro Football Hall of Famer
- Mike Dukes, former AFL linebacker, twoAll-Star (1960), two-time AFL Champion (1960–61)
- Antuan Edwards, former NFL cornerback/safety
- John Edwards, played for one year before transferring to NC State; former Democratic senator from North Carolina; 2004 vice presidential nominee
- Terrence Flagler, former NFL running back, first team All-American (1986)
- Kenny Flowers, former NFL running back
- Jacoby Ford, former NFL wide receiver with the Oakland Raiders
- Steve Fuller, former NFL quarterback for the Kansas City Chiefs, Los Angeles Rams, and Chicago Bears
- Rod Gardner, former NFL wide receiver
- Chris Gardocki, former NFL punter, Pro Bowler and All-Pro (1996)
- Dale Hatcher, former NFL punter, Pro Bowler and All-Pro (1985)
- Larry Hefner, former Green Bay Packers linebacker
- Leroy Hill, former Seattle Seahawks linebacker
- Tye Hill, former NFL cornerback, NCAA first-team All-American (2005)
- Bill Hudson, former AFL defensive tackle, All-Star (1961)
- Donald Igwebuike, former NFL placekicker
- Steven Jackson, former Carolina Panthers fullback
- Bobby Johnson, former Vanderbilt University head football coach
- John Johnson, NFL player
- Terry Kinard, former NFL defensive back, Pro Bowler (1988), two-time NCAA first-team All-American
- Levon Kirkland, former NFL linebacker, two-time Pro Bowler (1996–97), 1991 NCAA first-team All-American
- John Leake, former NFL linebacker
- Kevin Mack, former Cleveland Browns running back, two-time Pro Bowler (1985, 1987)
- Ray Mathews, former NFL wide receiver, two-time Pro Bowler
- Ed McDaniel, former NFL linebacker, Pro Bowler (1998), 1991 NCAA first-team All-American
- Banks McFadden, first same-season two-sport All-American in 1939 (football, basketball); 1939 Nation's Most Versatile Athlete, drafted 4th overall in the 1940 NFL draft by the Brooklyn Dodgers; 1940 NFL yards per carry leader; Clemson Ring-of-Honor; Voted Clemson's All-Time Greatest Athlete
- Chester McGlockton, former NFL defensive lineman, four-time Pro Bowler (1994–97)
- Phillip Merling, former NFL defensive end
- Justin Miller, former NFL cornerback, Pro Bowler (2006), All-Pro (2006)
- Harold Olson, former AFL tackle, All-Star (1961), All-Pro (1962)
- Michael Dean Perry, former NFL defensive lineman, six-time Pro Bowler (1989–91, 93–94, 96), AFC Defensive Player of the Year (1989), NCAA first-team All-American (1987)
- William "Refrigerator" Perry, former NFL defensive lineman, Super Bowl XX Champion, three-time NCAA All-American (1982–1984)
- Trevor Pryce, former NFL defensive lineman, two-time Super Bowl Champion, three-time All-Pro, four-time Pro Bowler
- Johnny Rembert, former NFL linebacker, two-time Pro Bowler (1989, 1990)
- Ashley Sheppard, former NFL linebacker
- Anthony Simmons, football player
- Wayne Simmons, former NFL Linebacker, Super Bowl XXXI Champion
- Jim Speros, former linebacker, Super Bowl-winning assistant coach; youngest assistant coach in NFL history
- Chansi Stuckey, former wide receiver for the New York Jets
- Jim Stuckey, former NFL defensive tackle for the San Francisco 49ers, two-time Super Bowl Champion
- David Treadwell, former NFL placekicker, NCAA first-team All-American (1987)
- Perry Tuttle, former NFL wider receiver, NCAA first-team All-American (1981)
- Charlie Waters, former Dallas Cowboys safety, two-time All-Pro (1977–78), three-time Pro Bowler (1976–78)
- Joel Wells, former NFL halfback
- Donnell Woolford, former NFL defensive back, Pro Bowler 1993, two-time NCAA first-team All-American (1987, 1988)

=== Golf ===
- Jonathan Byrd, PGA Tour golfer, five-time Tour winner
- Lucas Glover, PGA Tour golfer, 2009 U.S. Open champion, six-time Tour winner
- Matt Hendrix, PGA Tour golfer
- Kevin Johnson, PGA Tour golfer, six-time Nationwide Tour winner
- Ben Martin, PGA Tour golfer, U.S. Amateur runner-up in 2009
- Chris Patton, 1989 U.S. Amateur champion
- Clarence Rose, former PGA Tour golfer, winner of 1996 Sprint International
- Sam Saunders, PGA Tour golfer
- Kyle Stanley, PGA Tour golfer, winner of 2012 Waste Management Phoenix Open
- D. J. Trahan, PGA Tour golfer, winner of 2006 Southern Farm Bureau Classic and 2008 Bob Hope Chrysler Classic
- Charles Warren, PGA Tour golfer, winner of 1997 NCAA Championship

=== Soccer ===
- Greg Eckhardt, professional soccer player
- Stuart Holden, Bolton Wanderers and US National Team soccer player, midfielder
- Bruce Murray, All-American and Hermann Award winner on the Clemson Soccer team; won two National Championships; in the Clemson University Hall of Fame
- Oguchi Onyewu, A.C. Milan and US National Team soccer player, defender
- Dane Richards, N.Y. Red Bulls MLS player
- Kailen Sheridan, goalkeeper for North Carolina Courage and Canada women's national soccer team; bronze medalist at Rio 2016
- Hal Hershfelt, defensive midfielder for Washington Spirit and USWNT

=== Tennis ===
- Jay Berger, professional tennis player ranked as high as # 7 in the world
- Julie Coin, French tennis player
- Gigi Fernández, former women's tennis player; won 17 Grand Slam doubles titles and two Olympic gold medals; ranked the World No. 1 women's doubles player

=== Track and field ===
- Carlton Chambers, 1996 Olympic gold medalist in the 4×100 metres relay
- Shawn Crawford, 2004 Olympic gold and silver medalist in track and field; 2008 Olympic silver medalist in track and field
- Kim Graham, 1996 Olympic gold medalist in the 4×400 metres relay
- Michael Green, Jamaican-born sprinter, made the men's 100 m final at the 1996 Summer Olympics in Atlanta
- Patrícia Mamona, Portuguese-born 2020 Olympic silver medalist in the triple jump
- Brianna Rollins, 2016 Olympic gold medalist in the 100 meter hurdles
- Roje Stona, Jamaican-born 2024 Olympic gold medalist in discus throw
- Adam Linkenauger, 7x ACC Champion in the high jump, ACC Freshman of the Year

=== Wrestling ===
- Sammie Henson, 1993 and 1994 NCAA wrestling champion, 2000 Olympic silver medalist and 1998 world champion in freestyle wrestling
- Noel Loban, 1980 NCAA wrestling champion, 1984 Olympic bronze medalist in freestyle wrestling

=== Other sports ===
- Chris Eatough, professional marathon mountain bike racer, played soccer while attending Clemson
- Greg Erwin, competition director for Team Penske in NASCAR Nationwide Series, former crew chief
- Mitzi Kremer, 1998 Olympic bronze medalist in swimming
