= Senator Lester =

Senator Lester may refer to:

- Albert Lester (c. 1803–1867), New York State Senate
- Jimmy Lester (1932–2020), Georgia State Senate
- Rufus E. Lester (1837–1906), Georgia State Senate
