= 19th Battalion (United States Marine Corps) =

- Active: December 1936 – November 1940
- Country: United States of America
- Branch: United States Marine Corps
- Type: Reserve
- Garrison/HQ: Augusta, Georgia

19th Battalion was a battalion in the Fleet Marine Corps Reserve based in Augusta, Georgia.

== Subordinate units ==
- Headquarters Company
- Company A
- Company B
- Company C

== History ==
The battalion was formed in December 1936 and was mobilized 7 November 1940 for service in anticipation of World War II. Upon mobilization, the Marines were sent to various assignments throughout the Marine Corps as was customary for the time. The battalion was subsequently disbanded after mobilization.

== Notable former members ==
- Aquilla James Dyess
