= Dyess (surname) =

Dyess is a surname. Notable people with the surname include:

- Aquilla J. Dyess (1909–1944), Marine Corps Medal of Honor winner in World War II
- B.G. Dyess, American politician
- William E. Dyess (1916–1943), officer of the United States Army Air Forces in World War II
