= T. W. Josey High School =

Public high school in Augusta, Georgia, United States

Thomas Walter Josey Comprehensive High School
- T. W. Josey

Location
- 1701 15th St; Augusta, (Richmond County), Georgia 30901; United States; 33°27′18″N 82°00′01″W

Information
- Type: Public high school
- Established: 1964
- School district: Richmond County School System
- Superintendent: Dr. Malinda Cobb
- Principal: Dr. Derrias Priestley
- Teaching staff: 41.00 (FTE)
- Grades: 9-12
- Enrollment: 625 (2024–2025)
- Student to teacher ratio: 15.24
- Campus: Urban
- Colors: Green, white, and gold
- Mascot: Eagle
- Nickname: Eagles and Lady Eagles
- Website: T.W. Josey High School

T. W. Josey Comprehensive High School (commonly referred to as T. W. Josey or Josey High School) is a public high school in Augusta, Georgia, United States. Josey's campus is located several blocks south of the Medical District. The campus is bounded by 15th Street to the east, Essie McIntyre St. (at former city limits) to the north, and Eagles Way (named in honor of the school's football team in the 1990s) to the south.

== History ==
The school opened in 1964 as a school for African Americans, in the final decade of segregated schools in the county. It was named after Doctor Thomas Walter Josey, a prominent figure in local history.

Building improvements including a new classroom wing and building facade were added in the late 1960s.

== Student activities ==
=== Athletics ===
The school mascot is an eagle, and the school colors are green, white, and gold. The school has teams in football, basketball, soccer, track and field, and wrestling.

=== AFJROTC ===
The school retains a small Air Force JROTC contingent.

=== Marching band ===
The school's marching band consists of the band unit (the "Sonic Boom of the South"), a dancing line (the "Certified Gold Eaglettes"), and a flag line.

== Notable alumni ==
Name	Class year	Notability	Reference(s)
12 Gauge	1982	rapper (aka Isaiah Pinkney)	
Deon Grant	1997	NFL professional football player, New York Giants	
Arnold Harrison	2000	NFL professional football player, Pittsburgh Steelers, Cleveland Browns, now plays for UFL's Virginia Destroyers	
Jimmie Johnson	1984	retired NFL professional football player, NFL coach tight ends coach, Minnesota Vikings, 12th round draft pick 1989, Washington Redskins, Philadelphia Eagles, played 10 seasons	
Taj McWilliams-Franklin	1988	WNBA player, 39th overall, Orlando Miracle, currently with Minnesota Lynx	
Larry Leon Palmer	1966	US diplomat, United States Ambassador to Barbados and the Eastern Caribbean	
Raleigh Roundtree	1993	former NFL player, round 4, 1997, San Diego Chargers, Arizona Cardinals	
Shay Roundtree	1996	film actor, Drumline, Everybody Hates Chris, Shark, Sucker Free City	
Jeff Sanders	1985	NBA former NBA player, Chicago Bulls, Miami Heat, Atlanta Hawks	

== See also ==
- Richmond County School System
