= Robert Symms =

American photographer (1931–2014)

- Born: January 7, 1931; Augusta, Georgia, U.S.
- Died: May 8, 2014 (aged 83)
- Education: Junior College of Augusta
- Occupation: Photographer
- Spouse: Helen
- Children: 8

Robert Symms (January 7, 1931 – May 8, 2014) was an American photographer. He grew up in Augusta, Georgia, and graduated from Richmond Academy in 1948. He then attended the Junior College of Augusta (later Augusta State University).

When the Korean War broke out, Robert volunteered for the U. S. Army. He was turned down due to flat feet. Wanting to participate in some way, he and one of his best friends, Tommy Hodges, entered a contest for a spot on the USO tour. Other than photography, entertaining audiences was one of Robert's greatest passions. Robert and Tommy won the Augusta contest and secured a spot for the finals in New York City. They went by the name Click and Clack, due to the sound of the train to NYC. At the finals, the promoter thought two country boys from Augusta Georgia, had no chance, so he put them on first. Robert and Tommy's show was a mixture of slapstick, comedy and songs, true Vaudeville. The crowd had them come back for three encores. They won the contest and headlined a tour in 1952 that took them to Korea, Guam and Japan. Robert said they did not worry about the shells coming from behind them, but would hit the deck when the shells came the other way. After the tour, he returned to Augusta and his love of photography. But he would still continue to entertain groups for fun for the rest of his life. He said one of his greatest honors was a handshake and a "very well done" by then President Dwight Eisenhower. This was at the Augusta National Golf Club one evening after entertaining the President, Bobby Jones and Clifford Roberts after dinner. The family still has a treasured signed photograph of Ike and Mamie in front of their Augusta National Cabin.

He won many awards throughout the years and took many famous photographs, with one of his best-known being of Elvis Presley in an alley before a 1956 concert at Bell Auditorium in Augusta.

He worked for the Augusta Chronicle and Augusta Herald from 1951 to 1961. He ran his own photography business with friend Morgan Fitz. Fitz-Symms Photography Studios became an Augusta institution in 1949. They had the photo contract for the Augusta Chronicle and Herald for 10 years.

== Personal life ==
Robert was born and reared in Augusta and had two sisters, Carol and Mary. Symms was married to his third wife, Helen, and he had eight children in total from his marriages.
