= Leroy Suddath =

American major general (1931–2020)

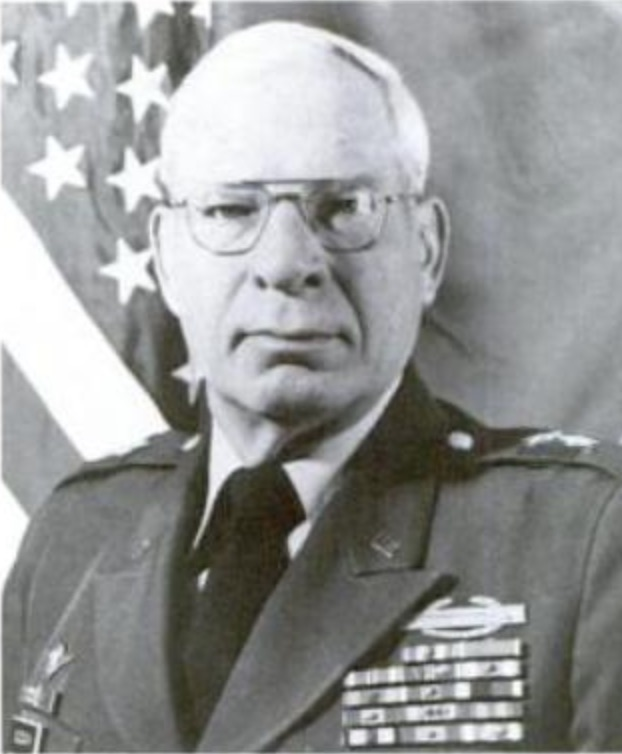
- Born: Leroy Newton Suddath Jr. February 21, 1931; Savannah, Georgia, U.S.
- Died: February 27, 2020 (aged 89); Savannah, Georgia, U.S.
- Burial place: Arlington National Cemetery
- Military career
- Allegiance: United States
- Branch: United States Army
- Service years: 1956–1988
- Rank: Major general
- Commands: 1st Special Operations Command
- Conflicts: Vietnam War; Gulf War

Leroy Newton Suddath Jr. (February 21, 1931 – February 27, 2020) was a major general in the United States Army. He was commissioned in 1956 after graduation from the United States Military Academy. Suddath served as commander of the 1st Special Operations Command before his retirement in 1988.

Born in Savannah at the Old Oglethorpe Sanitarium to Lucille and Leroy Suddath, he was the youngest of five children including Tom, Bill, Mary Ann, and Lucille. He attended Charles Ellis School, Richard Arnold Junior High School, Savannah High School, Georgia Military College and then graduated from Richmond Academy in Augusta where he was an All-GIAA Basketball player. He attended Auburn University on a basketball scholarship and the University of Georgia before entering the United States Military Academy at West Point, from which he graduated in 1956 and was commissioned a Second Lieutenant of Infantry.

He is a graduate of the United States Army Command and General Staff College, The Foreign Service Institute, The National War College and the Harvard University Program for Senior Executives in National and International Security.

He served two and a half years in Vietnam as an advisor to the 8th Vietnamese Airborne Battalion; as the Commander, Second Battalion, 28th Infantry, First Infantry Division; and in a special assignment with the Central Intelligence Agency.

He participated in eight campaigns and was decorated six times for gallantry in action. His awards and decorations include the Distinguished Service Medal; two Silver Star Medals; the Distinguished Flying Cross; Five Bronze Star Medals, the Vietnam Service Medal with eight campaign stars; the Order of Saint Maurice, the Master Parachutist Badge, the Ranger Tab and the Combat Infantry Badge. He was inducted into the Richmond Academy Hall of Fame in 2015. His General Officer assignments include the Assistant Division Commander, 82nd Airborne Division; Provost Marshal General, U.S. Army, Europe and Seventh United States Army; Commanding General U.S. Army Berlin Brigade; and the Commanding General United States Army Special Operations Command, consisting of Special Forces, Rangers, Special Operations Aviation, Psychological Operations and Civil Affairs Units.

General Suddath retired from the Army in 1988 and served as a consultant to Defense related industries and lastly, as the President for VnVets, GP, Inc. He was a member of the Savannah Golf Club and served on the Board of Managers. He was a communicant of Saint John’s Episcopal Church and a member of the vestry and former President of the Men of St. John’s. He was a member of the Society of the Office of Strategic Services (OSS); a member of the West Point Society of Savannah, the Harvard Club of Georgia and the Army Navy Club of Washington, DC. He was a former member of the Chatham Dove Club, The Forest City Gun Club, The Special Forces Club of London, England and the Augusta Country Club.

Suddath died at the age of 89 on February 27, 2020.
