= Shay Roundtree =

American actor

- Born: November 23, 1977 (age 48); Augusta, Georgia, U.S.
- Other name: Tree
- Occupations: Film, television actor
- Years active: 2002 — present
- Website: Shay Rountree Website

Shay Roundtree (born November 23, 1977, in Augusta, Georgia) is an American actor.

== Early life ==
Roundtree began his early training as an actor by joining drama clubs in his native hometown, Augusta, Georgia. He began his formal training as an actor at the Augusta Mini Theatre under the direction of Tyrone Butler and Judith Simon-Butler. After graduating from T. W. Josey High School in 1996, he went into pro acting.

While still attending college, Roundtree made his screen debut in the movie Drumline, starring Nick Cannon, Orlando Jones and Zoe Saldana. That movie, which was released in 2002, along with a television commercial appearance, qualified him to be a member of the Screen Actors Guild.

After attending college for three years at Clark Atlanta University, Roundtree decided to pursue his acting career full-time. He got into his 1987 Nissan Maxima (with 258,000 miles on it) and drove to Los Angeles to follow his dream. Three months after his arrival in the city, he auditioned and won the role of Junie Gatling on NBC's Kingpin.

== Filmography ==
Year	Title	Role	Notes
2002	Drumline	Big Rob	Screen Debut
2002	The District	Darnell	1 episode (uncredited)
2003	Kingpin	Junie Gatling	Main Cast
2003	The Handler	Eddie Williams	1 episode
2004	Shooter		Short
2004	Sucker Free City	Bonnie	TV movie
2005	The L.A. Riot Spectacular	Lil Monster	Movie
2005	Everybody Hates Chris	Thug #4	1 episode
2006	Shark	CSI	Pilot
2009	N.C.B.S.	Scott	Short
2010	Nobody Smiling	Jesse Ward	Movie
2012	Let It Shine	The Rap Battle Contest Host	Disney Channel Original Movie
2013	Karlton Says	Himself	1 episode
2013	The Bathroom Attendant	Al	Short
2014	Hungry	Bum	1 episode
2015	Save Me from Love	Keith	Movie (post-production)
