= Mark Richardson (American football) =

American businessman

Mark Richardson is an American businessman and co-owner of the Carolina Panthers along with his brother, Jon. Richardson was educated at Spartanburg High School , graduating in 1979. He graduated from Clemson University in 1983 with a degree in business administration. In 1987, he received an MBA from the University of Virginia. He is the son of Jerry Richardson

Richardson owns more than 50 Bojangles' Famous Chicken 'n Biscuits restaurants. In 2013, he was named a lifetime trustee of Clemson University.
