= Cranston Williams =

American newspaperman and publisher (c.1896–1989)

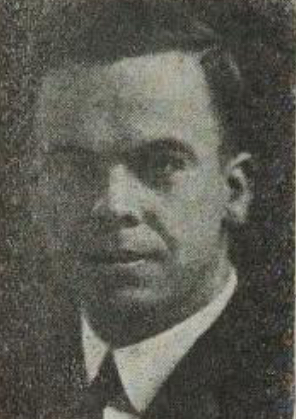
- Williams in 1925
- Born: c. 1896; Augusta, Georgia, US
- Died: January 8, 1989 (aged 93); Lynchburg, Virginia, US
- Occupation(s): Newspaperman, publisher
- Children: 1
- Military career
- Allegiance: United States
- Rank: Second lieutenant
- Battles / wars: World War I

Cranston Williams (c. 1896 – January 8, 1989) was an American newspaperman and publisher who managed the American Newspaper Publishers Association.

== Biography ==
Born c. 1896, in Augusta, Georgia, Williams attended Emory University. During World War I, he served in the United States Army, achieving the rank of second lieutenant. He began his career in journalism writing for the Americus Times-Recorder. He later managed the Southern Newspaper Publishers Association, then the American Newspaper Publishers Association, from c. 1939 until his retirement in 1960. As head, he advocated for truth-telling in journalism, such as on February 25, 1941, when he accused newspapers of incompetely covering national security under Franklin D. Roosevelt while speaking at the Englewood Golf Club. He married Caroline Hutter, having one son together. He died on January 8, 1989, aged 93, in Lynchburg, Virginia, of congestive heart failure.
