= Augusta Museum of History =

Coordinates: 33.47482°N 81.96060°W

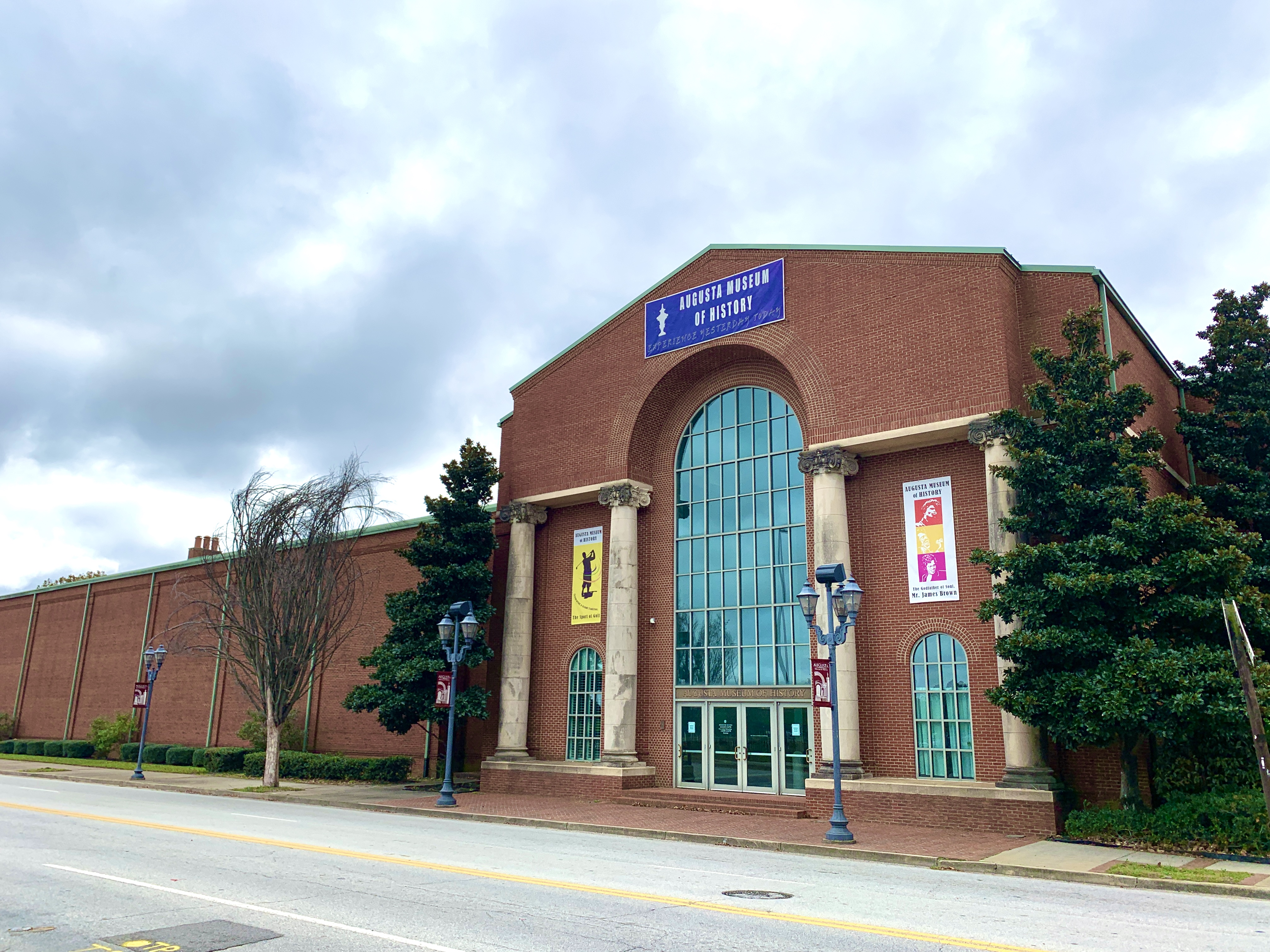
- Exterior view in November 2020
- Established: 1937; 89 years ago
- Location: 560 Reynolds Street; Augusta, Georgia, U.S.
- Type: History museum
- Accreditation: American Alliance of Museums
- Website: www.augustamuseum.org

The Augusta Museum of History is a history museum located in downtown Augusta, Georgia, U.S. The museum was founded in 1937 to preserve and share the history of Augusta and its surrounding area. On display are numerous artifacts, images, and dioramas that showcase the broad spectrum of the region's history. It is the only museum in the Central Savannah River Area accredited by the American Alliance of Museums.

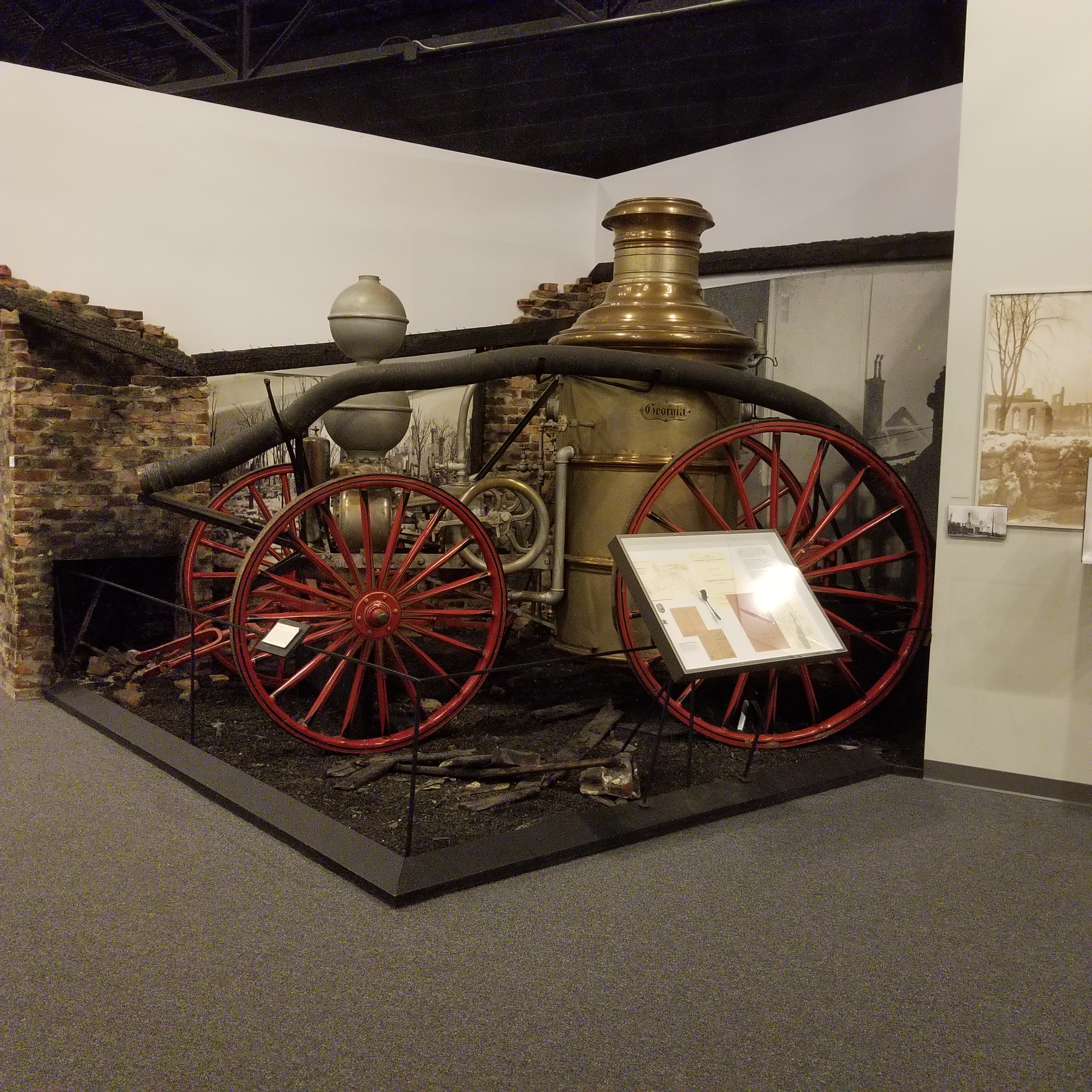
Display about the Augusta Fire of 1916 at the Augusta Museum of History

== Collections ==
- Augusta's Story – This exhibit explores the region's history. It is composed of artifacts from the prehistoric times to James Brown, the Godfather of Soul. Artifacts include a diorama of Stallings Island culture, slave-made pottery from the antebellum era, 12-pounder bronze Napoleon Cannon tube, and an 1869 steam fire engine that shows the destruction of the 1916 fire. An interactive computer interactive is also a part of the exhibit. The computer allows visitors to explore the American Revolution.
- One Man, Two Ships: Lessons in History and Courage – This exhibit showcases the story of Lieutenant Colonel Jimmie Dyess and the two ships, USS Dyess and USS Augusta.
- WBBQ – This exhibit showcases one of Augusta's most popular radio station. The most recent addition to the exhibit is the WBBQ: Then and Now section. This was installed in commemoration of the radio station's sixtieth anniversary. This exhibit is located in the Museum History Theater on the second floor of the museum.
- Georgia Railroad and Banking Company – This exhibit is called Into the Interior: A History of the Georgia Railroad and Banking Company. It is located in the Knox Foundation Center for the Preservation and Study of the Central Savannah River Area. The exhibit presents artifacts that recount the history of the company over a span of 153 years. Railroad maps, a locomotive bell, and stock books are just a few of the numerous objects that are located in the exhibit. The Georgia Railroad and Banking Company was amended in 1835 and is the most important company in Augusta and in the state of Georgia.
- Local Legends – exhibition of area-wide entertainers, musicians, singers, authors, athletes, journalists, and other notable personalities.
- The Transportation Corridor – This is a showcase of the transportation that the region has had over the past 150 years. There is a wide variety of vehicles that are shown in this exhibit. A few vehicles are a 1900 Farm Wagon, a 1917 Steam Locomotive, and a 1952 Dodge Power Wagon. Also placed in the exhibit is a reconstructed 1930s gas station.

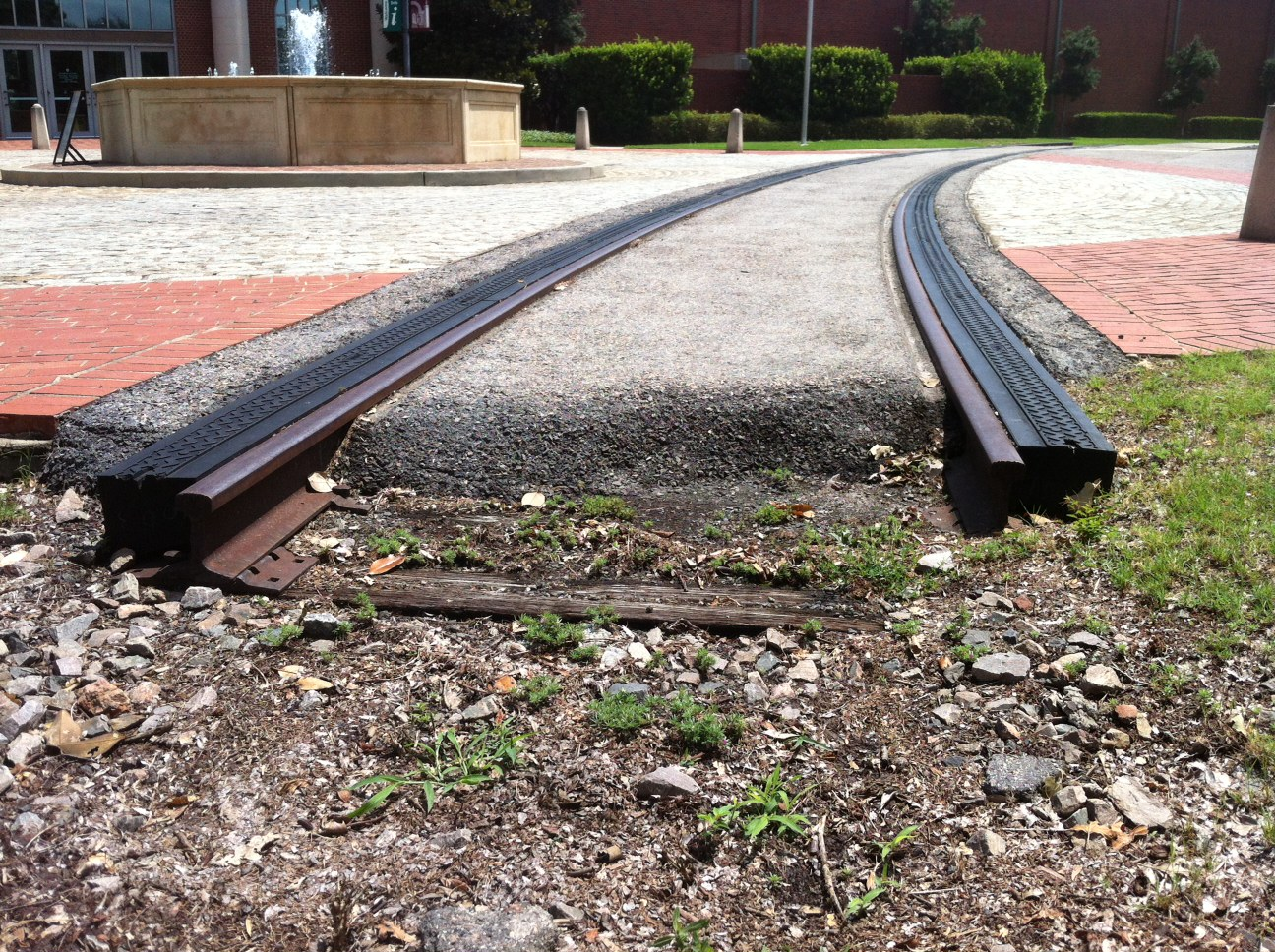
Spur Track segment at the Augusta Museum of History

== Exhibitions ==
- The Godfather of Soul, Mr. James Brown – This exhibit recounts the life of James Brown and highlights the events that led to his global fame. It displays artifacts and costumes from many different decades that were worn by Brown in his performances. One of the more specific artifacts is the ‘King of Soul’ crown that he wore in the 1950s. New additions to the exhibit are the programs of the James Brown Memorial Services. These programs are from the memorial services held in New York City, Augusta, and South Carolina. Kiosks add interactive features to the exhibit for more enjoyment by the visitors.
- Celebrating a Grand Tradition, the Sport of Golf – explores how the sport has evolved over the centuries, the technological advances of tees, balls, clubs, and accessories, as well as the history of golf in the Augusta region. Augusta is home to the Augusta National Golf Club.
- A Community That Heals – This exhibit chronicles the 200 years of Augusta's medical history. The first hospital was established in 1818, and was located on the 100 block of Greene Street. This hospital was also the first place that the Medical College of Georgia was located.
