= Kingpin (TV series) =

- Genre: Crime drama
- Created by: David Mills
- Starring: Yancey Arias; Sheryl Lee; Brian Benben; Bobby Cannavale; Angela Alvarado Rosa; Shay Roundtree; Rubén Carbajal
- Theme music composer: Daniel Indart
- Opening theme: "Theme from Kingpin" by Daniel Indart
- Country of origin: United States
- Original language: English
- No. of seasons: 1
- No. of episodes: 6

Production
- Executive producers: David Mills; Aaron Spelling; E. Duke Vincent
- Running time: 50 minutes
- Production companies: Knee Deep Productions; NBC Studios; Spelling Television

Original release
- Network: NBC
- Release: February 2 – February 18, 2003

Kingpin is an American crime drama television series which debuted on NBC in the United States and CTV in Canada on February 2, 2003, and lasted 6 episodes. The series detailed a Mexican drug trafficker named Miguel Cadena (Yancey Arias) and his family life. Low ratings and the network's discomfort with airing a show with a drug trafficker protagonist resulted in the show's cancellation. Commercials on NBC featured the song "Más" by the Mexican band Kinky, which also featured in the series.

== Cast ==
- Yancey Arias as Miguel Cadena
- Sheryl Lee as Marlene McDillon Cadena
- Rubén Carbajal as Joey Cadena
- Bobby Cannavale as Chato Cadena
- Angela Alvarado Rosa as Delia Flores
- Brian Benben as Dr. Heywood Klein
- Shay Roundtree as Junie Gatling
- Neko Parham as Shawn Williams
- Elpidia Carrillo as Lupita
- Eduardo Palomo as Capt. Lazareno
- Sean Young as Lorelei Klein
- Toy Connor as Sheronda Clifford

== Crew ==
The series was created by writer David Mills. Mills also served as the head writer, show runner and an executive producer. Aaron Spelling and E. Duke Vincent were the series other executive producers. James L. Conway and Jonathan Levin were consulting producers for the series. Daniel Sackheim was a co-executive producer and regular director. Doug Palau was a supervising producer and writer for the series. Paul Cajero was the series line producer.

The series other writers were Lloyd Rose, Diego Gutierrez, Maria Elena Rodriguez, Floyd Salas and Susie Putnam. The series other directors were Allen Coulter, James Hayman, Michael M. Robin and Peter O'Fallon.

== Episodes ==
No.	Title	Original release date	Prod. code	U.S. viewers (millions)
1	"Pilot"	February 2, 2003	001	12.50
2	"El Velorio"	February 4, 2003	004	9.60
3	"Black Magic Woman"	February 9, 2003	002	11.16
4	"French Connection"	February 11, 2003	005	8.54
5	"The Odd Couple"	February 16, 2003	003	9.79
6	"Gimme Shelter"	February 18, 2003	006	7.50
