= Pleasant A. Stovall =

American diplomat (1857–1935)

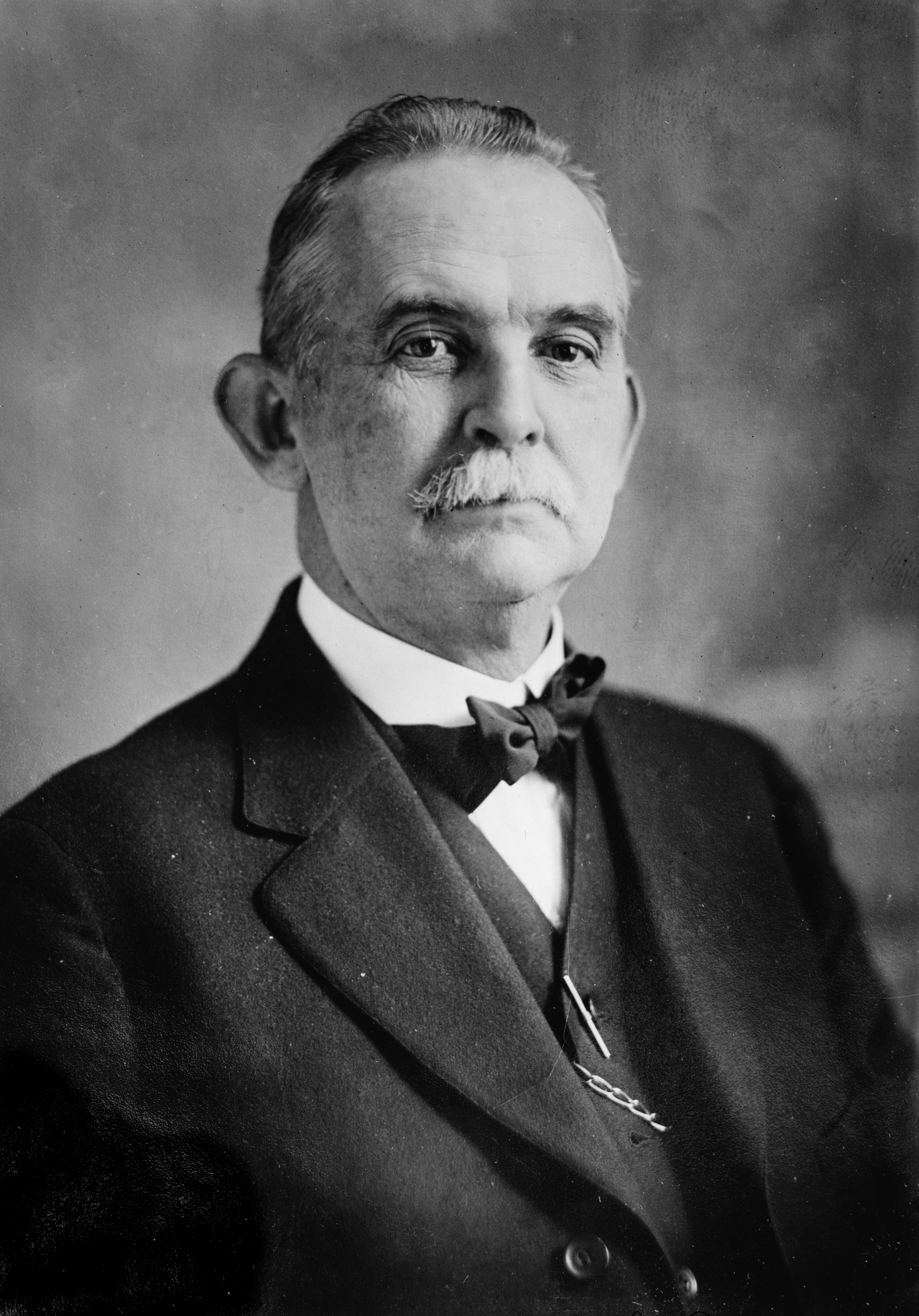
Pleasant Alexander Stovall circa 1910

Pleasant Alexander Stovall (1857–1935) was the United States ambassador to Switzerland from 1913 until late 1919 or early 1920. Among other actions while representing the United States in Switzerland he signed documents committing the United States to be part of the World Court. The United States Senate later put so many restrictions and conditions on US entry into the World Court that the other nations participating in it refused to allow the United States to join.

== Biography ==
Stovall was the son of Bolling Anthony Stovall, a cotton broker, and his wife the former Martha Wilson. Stovall grew up in Augusta, Georgia and was a boyhood friend of Woodrow Wilson, who would later, as president, appoint him as an ambassador. When Stovall was sixteen his family moved to Athens, Georgia. He was educated at Richmond Academy and the University of Georgia graduating from the latter in 1875.

Stovall married Mary Ganahl (1861–1951).

In the late 1880s Stovall was editor of the Augusta Chronicle. In 1891 Stovall founded the Savannah Press, a newspaper in Savannah that he served as editor and owner of. This paper was later renamed the Savannah Evening Press. The paper later merged with the Savannah Morning News.

Stovall served as a member of the Georgia State Legislature from 1902 to 1906 and from 1912 until he resigned to become United States ambassador to Switzerland. He was a member of the Democratic Party and served as a delegate to the Democratic national Convention in 1924.

He died in 1935.

== Legacy ==
Stovall wrote a biography of Robert Toombs in the 1890s and a book on Switzerland largely drawing on his experience as US ambassador there that was published posthumously in 1939.

== Sources ==
- Time Dec. 16, 1929
- record connected with cemetery where Stovall is buried
