= Roland A. Steiner =

Roland A. Steiner (December 1839 - January 12, 1906) was an American physician, planter, folklorist, and amateur archaeologist who resided in the US state of Georgia for most of his life. His archaeological pursuits in Georgia are his most prominent lifetime achievement. He also made significant contributions in the nascent disciplines of cultural anthropology and folklore.

== Early life and education ==
Roland was born in Philadelphia, Pennsylvania in December 1839 to Dr. Henry Hagner Steiner, a physician, and Susannah Wilhelmina Yoe Steiner. Roland fought at Richmond and Chancellorsville, Virginia during the Civil War as a private with Company C of the 48th Regiment, Georgia Volunteer Infantry, Army of Northern Virginia.

Roland graduated from Princeton College in New Jersey in 1861, and he graduated from the Medical College of Virginia during the spring of 1864.

On October 13, 1870, Roland married Willhelmine J. Taylor, who was one of the wealthiest women in Georgia. Their wedding took place in Manhattan, New York, New York.

== Career ==
During the latter half of the 19th century and into the early part of the 20th century, Roland collected a massive quantity of prehistoric artifacts from areas throughout Georgia; including Mound C at the Etowah Mound site near Cartersville, Georgia, and sites in Burke, Columbia, Floyd, Hancock, and several other counties. He became a member of the Georgia Historical Society on July 7, 1886, the American Association for the Advancement of Science in 1899, and the American Folklore Society in the same year. Roland was a founding member of the American Anthropological Association.

In his lifetime, Roland collected more than 100,000 Native American relics from Georgia and South Carolina. Throughout the 1890s and early part of the 1910s, Steiner sent approximately 78,000 artifacts including copper axes, copper headdresses, conch shell cups and gorgets, pearl beads, pottery vessels, pottery statuettes, and other artifacts made of polished and chipped stone to the Smithsonian Museum of Natural History in Washington, D.C. His private collection at the Smithsonian is the largest private collection in the museum. Steiner also has collection of artifacts located at the American Museum of Natural History in New York, New York, the Field Museum in Chicago, Illinois, and the Peabody Museum in Massachusetts.

In addition to his interest in archaeology, Roland also was one of Georgia's first ethnologists. He contributed several papers to the Journal of American Folklore, including several that were published. Elliott (2016) compiled the available corpus of these works.

== Death ==
Roland died on January 12, 1906, in Augusta, Georgia, of an illness that had begun two weeks earlier. He was buried in the old cemetery at Waynesboro, Georgia, next to the grave of his wife.
