= Jimmie Johnson (American football) =

American football player and coach (born 1966)

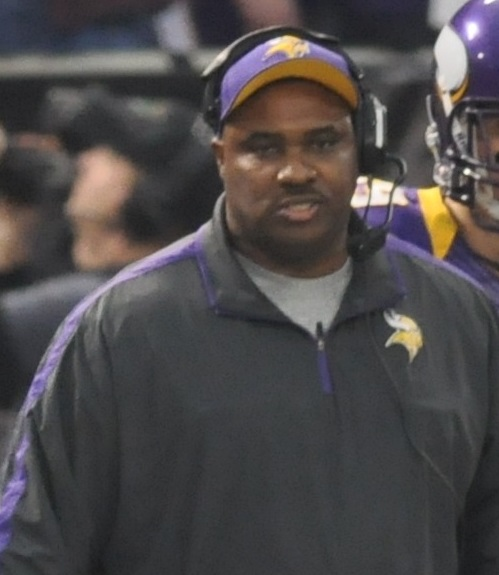
- Johnson in 2012

Howard Bison
- Title: Offensive coordinator & tight ends coach

Personal information
- Born: October 6, 1966 (age 60); Augusta, Georgia, U.S.
- Listed height: 6 ft 2 in (1.88 m)
- Listed weight: 252 lb (114 kg)

Career information
- High school: T.W. Josey (Augusta)
- College: Howard
- NFL draft: 1989: 12th round, 316th overall pick

Career history

Playing
- Washington Redskins (1989–1991); Detroit Lions (1992–1993); Kansas City Chiefs (1994); Philadelphia Eagles (1995–1998)

Coaching
- South Carolina State (2001) Running backs coach; Shaw (2002) Offensive coordinator & running backs coach & tight ends coach; Texas Southern (2004–2005) Offensive coordinator & quarterbacks coach; Minnesota Vikings (2006–2013) Tight ends coach; New York Jets (2015–2018) Tight ends coach; DC Defenders (2020) Tight ends coach; Maryland (2020–2022) Analyst; San Antonio Brahmas (2023) Offensive coordinator & running backs coach; Morgan State (2025) Assistant offensive line coach; Howard (2026–present) Offensive coordinator & tight ends coach

Awards and highlights
- Super Bowl champion (XXVI)

Career NFL statistics
- Receptions: 61
- Receiving yards: 723
- Touchdowns: 5
- Stats at Pro Football Reference

Jimmie Olden Johnson Jr. (born October 6, 1966) is an American former professional football player who was a tight end in the National Football League (NFL). Johnson played college football for the Howard Bison and in the National Football League (NFL) from 1989 to 1998. He is a member of Omega Psi Phi fraternity.

== Early life and college ==
Johnson was born and raised in Augusta, Georgia and attended T. W. Josey High School. In 1989, Johnson graduated from Howard University with a bachelor's degree in consumer studies. He played four seasons on the Howard Bison football team and was a first-team All-Mid-Eastern Athletic Conference selection in 1988 as a senior. With Howard, Johnson made 73 catches for 1,229 yards and 16 touchdowns. Johnson was also a Two Time Sheridan Broadcasting Black College All-America in 1987 and 1988.

== Coaching career ==
Johnson began his coaching career in 2001 as running backs coach at South Carolina State University. He then became the Offensive Coordinator/QB's and Wide Receivers coach at the NCAA Division II Shaw University in 2002 and 2003. From 2004 to 2005, Johnson was the offensive coordinator and quarterbacks coach at Texas Southern University. In 2006, Johnson joined the Minnesota Vikings as the tight ends coach. He was let go by the Vikings at the end of the 2013 season after head coach Leslie Frazier was fired.

=== New York Jets ===
Johnson was named the New York Jets' tight end coach on January 29, 2015.

=== San Antonio Brahmas ===
Johnson was officially hired by the San Antonio Brahmas on September 13, 2022
