= Jimmy Lester =

American politician

Member of the Georgia State Senate from the 23rd district
- In office 1971–1985
- Succeeded by: Frank Albert

Personal details
- Born: James L. Lester Jr. January 12, 1932 Richmond County, Georgia, U. S.
- Died: February 17, 2020 (aged 88)
- Party: Democratic
- Spouse: Gwendolyn Gleason
- Children: 2
- Education: The Citadel; University of Georgia School of Law

James L. Lester Jr. (January 12, 1932 – February 17, 2020) was an American politician. He served as a Democratic member for the 23rd district of the Georgia State Senate.

== Life and career ==
Lester was born in Richmond County, Georgia, the son of Elizabeth Miles and William McMorris. He attended Richmond Academy and The Citadel, graduating the latter in 1952.

After graduating, Lester served in the United States Army during the Korean War as a lieutenant. He was discharged in 1954, after which he attended the University of Georgia School of Law, where he earned his Juris Doctor degree in 1957. In the midst of his educational journey, he fell in love with a well educated, fierce red headed woman, her name, Gwendolyn. In 1958, no time was wasted. The Lester’s had two boys, Frank & Jimmy Jr.

Lester worked with his father at a law firm. In 1971, he was elected to represent the 23rd district of the Georgia State Senate. Lester served until 1985, when he was succeeded by Frank Albert.

Lester died in February 2020, at the age of 88.
