= USS Dyess =

Gearing-class destroyer

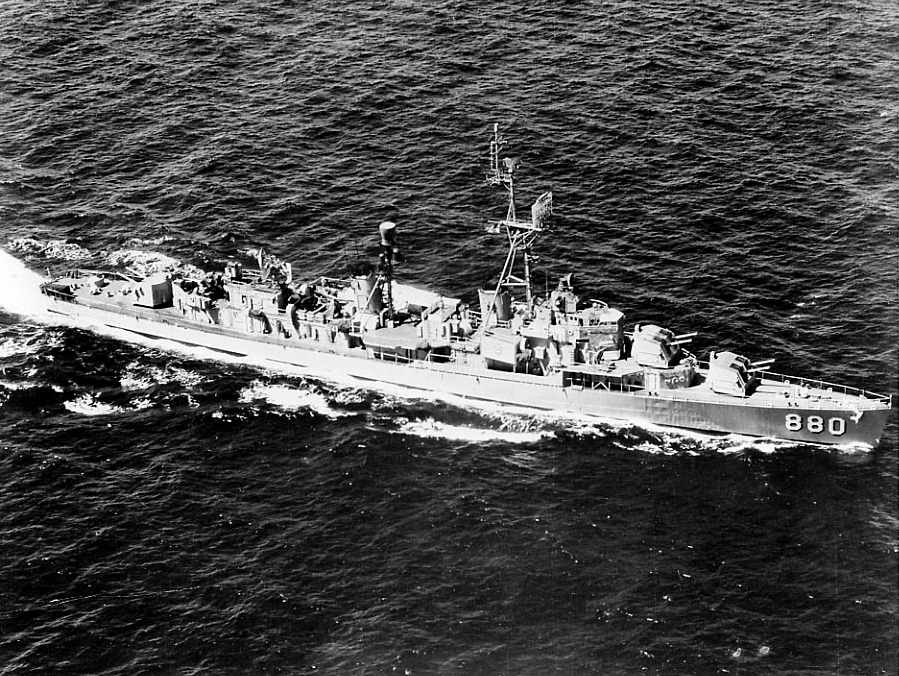
- USS Dyess in the Mediterranean Sea, 1962

History

United States
- Name: USS Dyess
- Namesake: Aquilla J. Dyess
- Ordered: 19 July 1940
- Builder: Consolidated Steel Corporation
- Laid down: 17 August 1944
- Launched: 26 January 1945
- Commissioned: 21 May 1945
- Decommissioned: 27 January 1981
- Identification: Callsign: NBHW; Hull number: DD-880
- Fate: Sold to Greece for spare parts, 8 July 1981

General characteristics
- Class & type: Gearing-class destroyer
- Displacement: 2,616 tons standard; 3,460 tons full load
- Length: 390.6 ft (119.1 m)
- Beam: 40.10 ft (12.22 m)
- Draft: 14.4 ft (4.4 m)
- Propulsion: 2 shafts; General Electric steam turbines; 4 boilers; 60,000 shp (45,000 kW)
- Speed: 36.8 knots (68.2 km/h)
- Range: 4,500 nmi (8,300 km; 5,200 mi) at 20 knots (37 km/h; 23 mph)
- Complement: 336
- Armament: 6 x 5 in (130 mm)/38 dual purpose guns; 12 x 40 mm anti-aircraft guns; 11 x 20 mm anti-aircraft guns; 10 x 21-inch (533 mm) torpedo tubes

USS Dyess (DD/DDR-880), a Gearing-class destroyer, was a ship of the United States Navy named for Aquilla James Dyess (1909–1944). Dyess was awarded the Medal of Honor posthumously for his leadership of his battalion of Marines in the Battle of Kwajalein. The ship was laid down by Consolidated Steel Corporation at Orange, Texas on 17 August 1944, launched on 26 January 1945 and commissioned on 21 May 1945. The vessel spent the majority of her career patrolling the Mediterranean Sea with NATO forces. The ship was decommissioned on 27 January 1981 and sold to Greece the same year for spare parts.

== Construction and career ==
Dyess was laid down by the Consolidated Steel Corporation at Orange, Texas on 17 August 1944, launched on 26 January 1945 by Mrs. A. J. Dyess, widow of Lieutenant Colonel Dyess and commissioned on 21 May 1945. After her shakedown cruise and conversion to a radar picket destroyer, Dyess sailed from Norfolk 7 November 1945 to join the 5th Fleet at Tokyo Bay 19 December for occupation duty in the Far East. She returned to San Diego on 16 December 1946, and on 6 January 1947, got underway for the east coast, arriving at Norfolk 23 January. She served in local training cruises until August of that year when she sailed to Rio de Janeiro, Brazil, to escort President Harry S. Truman, embarked in the battleship USS Missouri as far as Norfolk, where he transferred to the presidential yacht Williamsburg which Dyess escorted to Washington, D.C.

Dyess arrived at Newport, Rhode Island, on 27 September 1947 for local training operations. After a tour of duty with the 6th Fleet in the Mediterranean from 29 October to 14 February 1948, she returned to her home port of Norfolk. She was reclassified DDR-880 18 March 1949. Until the end of 1958 Dyess made nine tours of duty with the 6th Fleet in the Mediterranean, patrolling to preserve peace and engaging in exercises with NATO forces. She also sailed on two midshipman cruises, one to southern Europe in the summer of 1948 and one to Halifax, Nova Scotia, in the summer of 1951.

The remainder of her service was as varied as her capabilities. She acted as plane guard during the qualifying of pilots in carrier operations and joined in hunter-killer exercises, amphibious training, and large-scale fleet exercises. She assisted in the evacuation of American nationals from Suez during the Suez Crisis which developed during her 1956 Mediterranean cruise. In the summer of 1958 she joined in strengthening the free world's defenses with NATO operations in northern Europe. Dyess operated along the east coast and off Cuba in 1959, and on 25 July arrived at Charleston, South Carolina, her new home port. On 29 January 1960 she sailed on her tenth deployment to the Mediterranean.

From March to July 1966 Dyess conducted a WESTPAC (Western Pacific) deployment which included gunfire support missions in the area around Da Nang and the III Corps area of operations in South Vietnam. Dyess returned to Newport in August 1966.

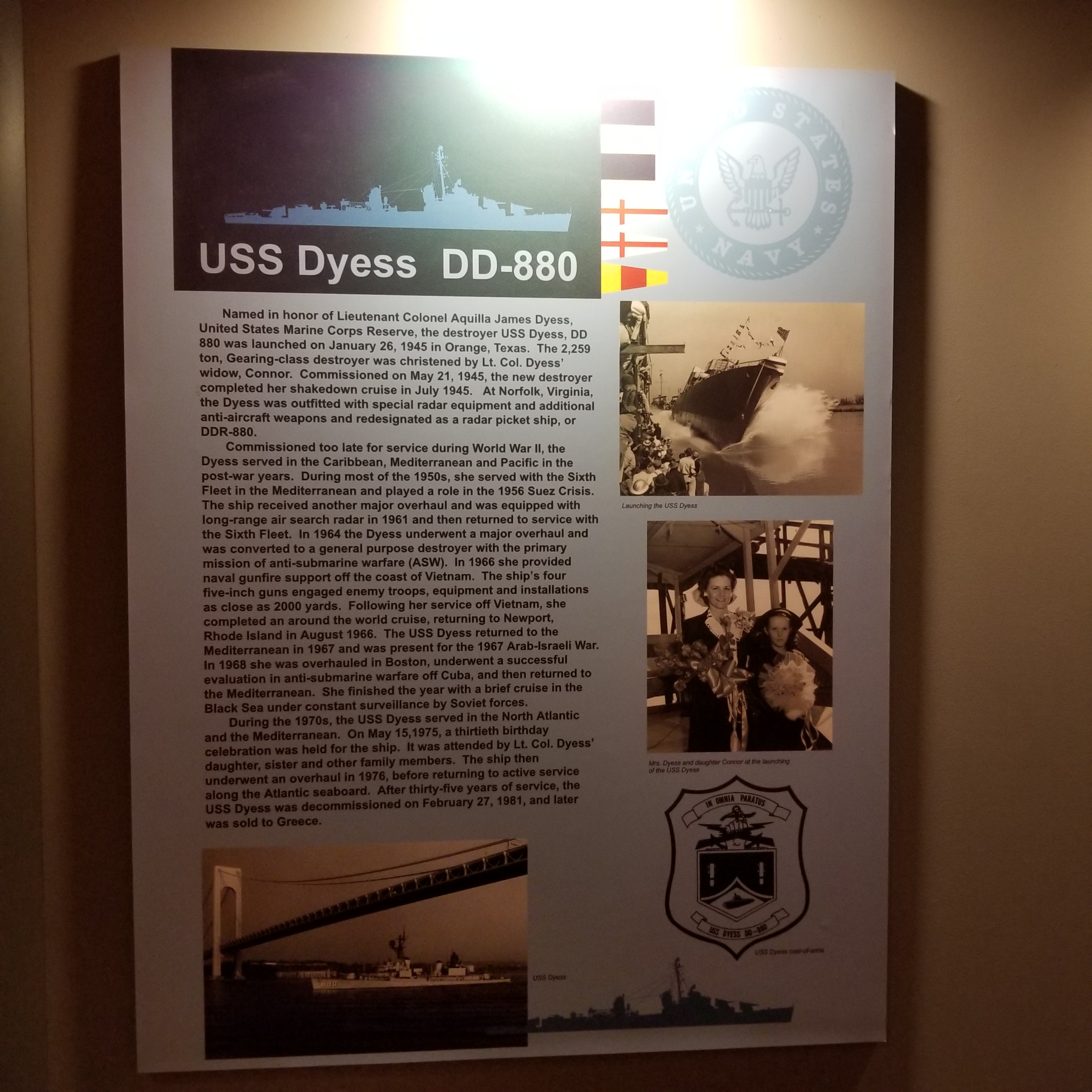
Board describing USS Dyess (DD-880) at the Augusta Museum of History

Dyess returned to Charleston in August, and in October entered Charleston Naval Shipyard, where she remained until the end of 1960. Dyess was in the Brooklyn Naval Yard in the 1970s as a Navy reserve ship. Dyess was decommissioned on 27 January 1981, stricken from the Naval Vessel Register on 27 February 1981, transferred to Greece on 8 July 1981 and cannibalized for spare parts.
