= Carnegie Hero Fund =

Private award for civilian heroism in US and Canada

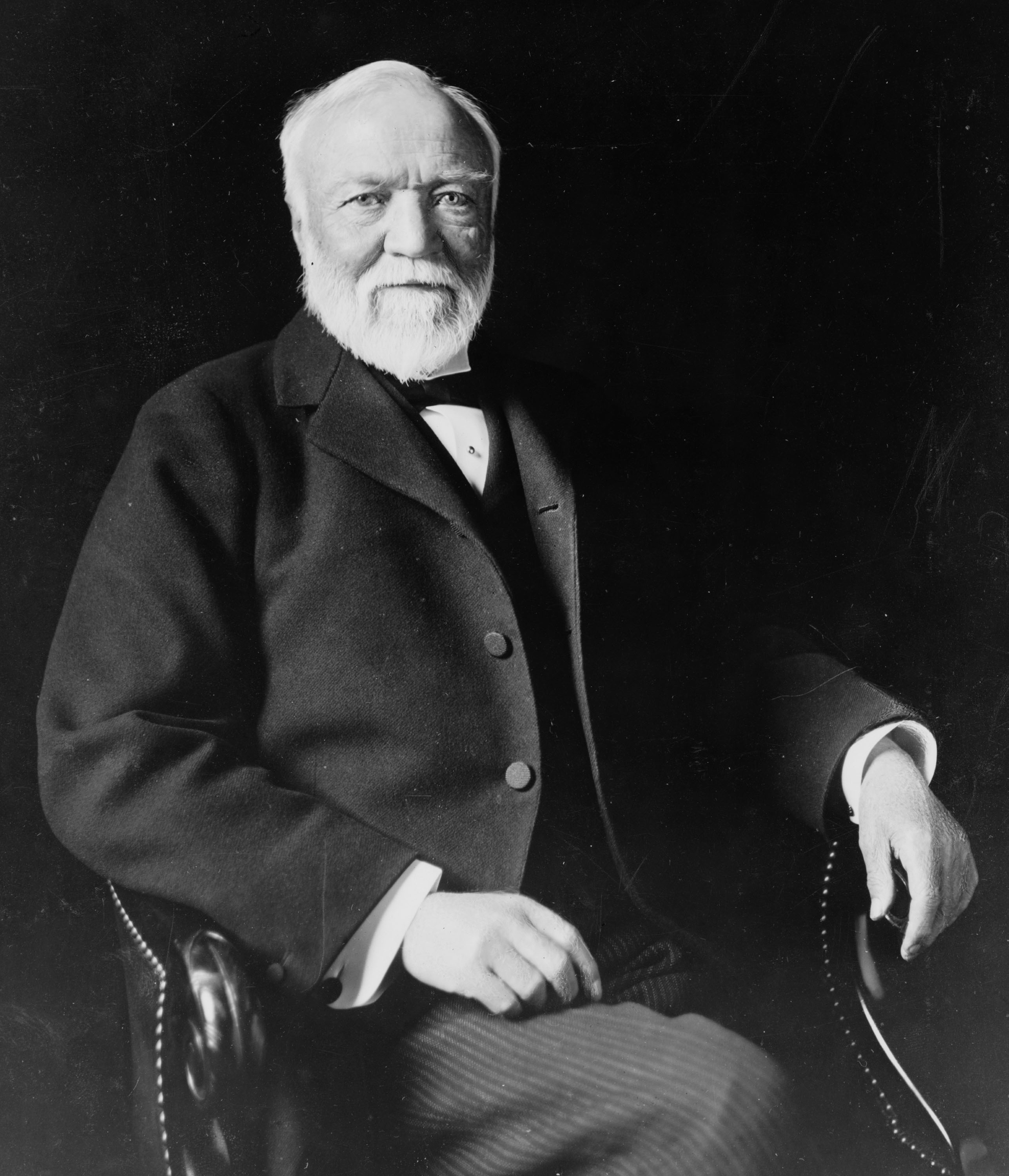
Andrew Carnegie

The Carnegie Hero Fund Commission, also known as Carnegie Hero Fund, was established to recognize persons who perform extraordinary acts of heroism in civilian life in the United States and Canada, and to provide financial assistance for those disabled and the dependents of those killed saving or attempting to save others. Those chosen for recognition receive the Carnegie Medal and become eligible for scholarship aid and other benefits. A private operating foundation, the Hero Fund was established in Pittsburgh, Pennsylvania, in 1904 with a trust fund of $5 million by Andrew Carnegie, the Scottish-American industrialist and philanthropist.

== History ==
The fund was inspired by Selwyn M. Taylor and Daniel A. Lyle, who gave their lives in rescue attempts following the Harwick Mine disaster in Harwick, Pennsylvania, just outside Pittsburgh, on January 25, 1904. The disaster claimed 181, including Taylor and Lyle, who were killed during rescue attempts. Greatly touched by Taylor's and Lyle's sacrifice, Carnegie had medals privately minted for their families, and within two months he wrote the Hero Fund's governing "Deed of Trust", which was adopted by the newly created commission on April 15, 1904.

== Administration ==
The Fund is administered by a 21-member volunteer board and a small staff. As of December 2022, a total of 10,340 Carnegie Medals have been awarded since the Fund was established, with the Fund paying $40.5 million in grants, scholarships, death benefits, and other aid. About 11% of nominees received the Carnegie Medal.

The Commission’s working definition of a hero as well as its requirements for awarding remain largely those that were approved by the founder. The Fund's website states the criteria:

- "The rescuer must be a civilian who knowingly and voluntarily risks his or her own life to an extraordinary degree. Members of the armed services and children considered by the Commission too young to comprehend the risk involved are ineligible for consideration."
- "The rescuer must have rescued or attempted the rescue of another person."
- "The act of heroism must have occurred in the United States, Canada, or the waters thereof (12 nautical miles).
- "The act must be brought to the attention of the Commission within two years of the date of its occurrence."
- "The act of rescue must be one in which no full measure of responsibility exists between the rescuer and the rescued, which precludes those whose vocational duties require them to perform such acts, unless the rescues are clearly beyond the line of duty; and members of the immediate family, except in cases of outstanding heroism where the rescuer loses his or her life or is severely injured."
- "There must be conclusive evidence to support the threat to the victim’s life, the risk undertaken by the rescuer, the rescuer’s degree of responsibility, and the act's occurrence."

About 90% of those awarded are male, and, over the life of the Fund, roughly one-quarter of awards have been given posthumously.

=== Carnegie Medal ===
The three inch (7.13 cm) in diameter bronze medals which are given to awardees, are struck by Simons Brothers Co. of Philadelphia and consist of 90% copper and 10% tin.

A verse from the Gospel of John encircles the outer edge: "Greater love hath no man than this, that a man lay down his life for his friends" (John 15:13).

The first medals issued by the trust were in bronze, silver and gold. The trust soon stopped issuing gold medals. The last silver medal was issued in 1981.

== Expanded into Europe ==
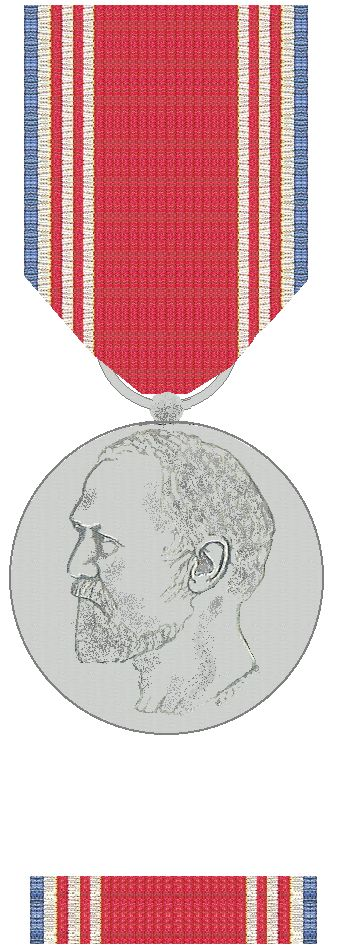
Dutch medal of the Carnegie Hero Fund.

On 21 September 1908, Andrew Carnegie expanded the concept with the establishment of the British Carnegie Hero Fund Trust, based in Dunfermline, Scotland.

Within the next three years, the British trust was followed by equivalent foundations in nine other European countries:

- The French Fondation Carnegie – founded 23 July 1909
- The German Carnegie Stiftung für Lebensretter – founded in late December 1910. The trust was taken over by the German Nazi government in 1934 and wasn't recreated until 2005.
- The Norwegian Carnegie Heltefond for Norge – founded 21 March 1911
- The Dutch Stichting Carnegie Heldenfonds – founded 23 March 1911
- The Swiss Fondation Carnegie pour les Sauveteurs ("The Carnegie Rescuers Foundation") – founded 28 April 1911
- The Belgian Carnegie Hero Fund Commission – founded 13 July 1911
- The Italian Fondazione Carnegie – founded 25 September 1911
- The Swedish Carnegiestiftelsen – founded 6 October 1911
- The Danish Carnegies Belønningsfond for Heltemod – founded 30 December 1911. The Danish trust also covers acts of heroism in Greenland and the Faroe Islands.

== See also ==
- Lenny Skutnik – Carnegie Medal recipient, 1982
- Aquilla J. "Jimmie" Dyess – Carnegie Medal recipient, 1929, and Medal of Honor recipient (posthumous), 1944
- Tiny Lund - Carnegie Medal Recipient, 1963. Saving the life of Marvin Panch in a crash at Daytona International Speedway
