= Aquilla J. Dyess =

Marine Corps Medal of Honor recipient

Aquilla James Dyess
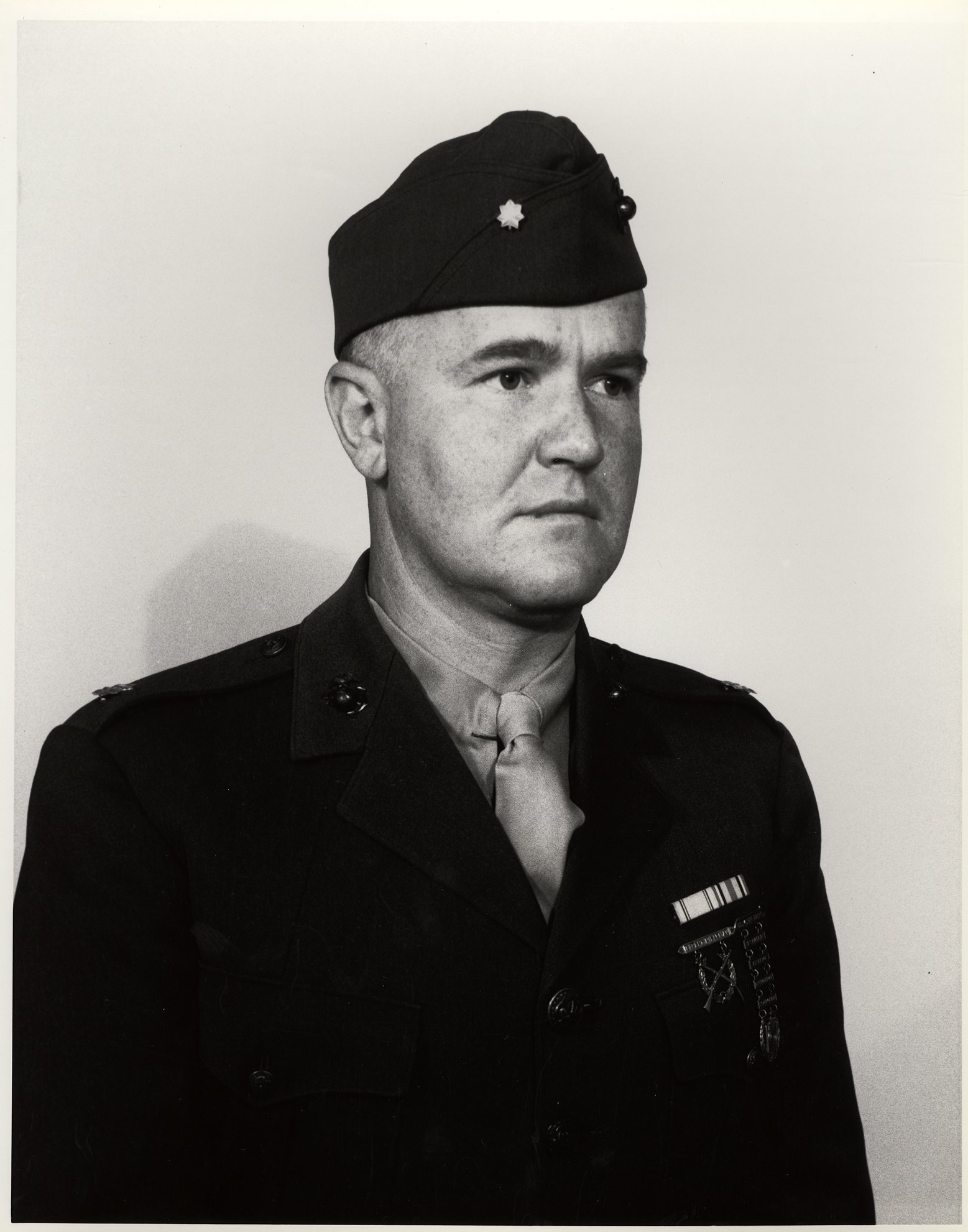
- Aquilla J. Dyess, posthumous Medal of Honor recipient
- Born: January 11, 1909; Andersonville, Georgia
- Died: February 2, 1944 (aged 35); Kwajalein Atoll, Gilbert Islands
- Burial place: Westover Memorial Park Cemetery, Augusta, Georgia
- Military career
- Allegiance: United States of America
- Branch: United States Marine Corps
- Service years: 1931–1936 (U.S. Army Reserve); 1936–1944 (USMCR)
- Rank: Lieutenant colonel
- Commands: 1st Battalion 24th Marines
- Conflicts: World War II: Battle of Kwajalein †
- Awards: Carnegie Medal; Medal of Honor; Purple Heart
- Other work: general contractor

Lieutenant Colonel Aquilla James Dyess (January 11, 1909 – February 2, 1944) was a United States Marine Corps officer who was a posthumous recipient of the Medal of Honor for "conspicuous gallantry and intrepidity at the risk of his life" at the head of his troops during World War II, in the Battle of Kwajalein, on Namur Island, Kwajalein Atoll, Marshall Islands on February 2, 1944.

== Early life, education, and career ==
Aquilla James Dyess was born on January 11, 1909, in Andersonville, Georgia. As a youth, he attained the rank of Eagle Scout, highest in the Boy Scouts. In 1929, he was awarded the Carnegie Medal for saving two swimmers off the coast of Charleston, South Carolina, in 1928.

Dyess graduated from Clemson College, Clemson, South Carolina, in 1932 with a Bachelor of Science degree in architecture. At Clemson, he served as a cadet major in the Reserve Officers' Training Corps, and was appointed a second lieutenant in the Army Infantry Reserve in 1931.

In civilian life, he was a general contractor. He also served as assistant director of a summer camp for boys.

== Marines ==
Dyess was appointed a first lieutenant in the Marine Corps Reserve in November 1936 and was assigned to 19th Battalion, a reserve unit in Augusta, Georgia. In 1937, 1st Lt. Dyess was awarded the bronze star as a shooting member of the Marine Corps Rifle Team, which won the Hilton trophy in the National matches, and was given the same award in 1938 as an alternate member of the team that captured the Rattlesnake trophy in the matches.

On February 1, 1944, the day preceding Dyess's death, six U.S. Marine snipers were on patrol on Namur Island where Japanese forces had taken up protected positions following the Battle of Kwajalein. The Marine patrol had inadvertently moved behind enemy lines, surrounded on three sides by Japanese forces, where they came under small arms fire from a concealed position. One of the Marines was killed instantly, and four of the remaining five Marines sustained injuries from the attack. One of the injured Marines, Cpl. Frank Pokrop, later recalled, “with no protection and heavy fire coming at us from a few feet away and dusk approaching, we were certain to be killed. All of a sudden Col. Dyess broke through on the right, braving the very heavy fire, and got all of us out of there."

Lieutenant Colonel Dyess was killed on February 2, 1944, by a burst of enemy machine gun fire while standing on the parapet of an anti-tank trench directing a group of infantry in a flanking attack against the last Japanese position in the northern part of Namur Island. In this final assault, Dyess posted himself between the opposing lines and, exposed to fire from heavy automatic weapons, led his troops in the advance. Wherever the attack was slowed by heavier enemy fire, he quickly appeared and placed himself at the head of his men and inspired them to push forward.

Dyess was initially buried in the 4th Marine Division cemetery on Roi-Namur Island, Kwajalein Atoll, Marshall Islands. In 1948, he was re-interred in Westover Memorial Park Cemetery, Augusta, Georgia.

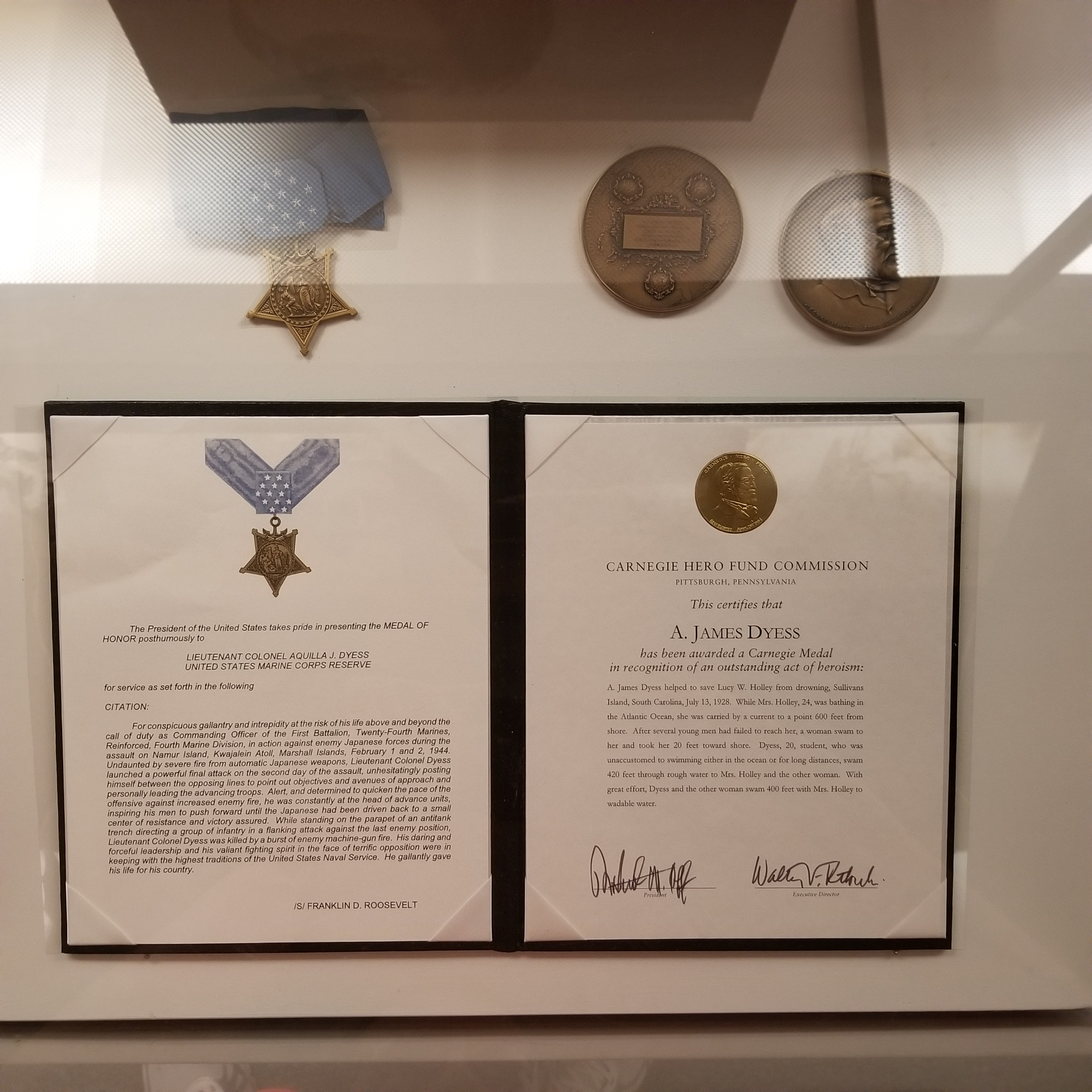
Board that displays honors awarded to Jimmie Dyess, at the Augusta Museum of History

== Honors ==
Dyess was awarded a Medal of Honor for his actions. He is one of only nine known Eagle Scouts who also received the Medal of Honor. He is the only American to receive both the Carnegie Medal for civilian heroism and the Medal of Honor.

== Legacy ==
In 1945, the destroyer USS Dyess (DD-880) was named in honor of Dyess.

The Georgia-Carolina Council of the Boy Scouts of America celebrates Dyess' life in a triennial Jimmie Dyess Days event at Fort Gordon.

Georgia State Route 383, a four-lane highway from Interstate 20 near Augusta, Georgia, to Fort Gordon is named Jimmie Dyess Parkway in his honor.

In 2013, the Young Marines in Augusta, Georgia, area, were chartered and chose "Jimmie Dyess Young Marines" as the official name for their unit.

== Awards and decorations ==

Medal of Honor Purple Heart
Combat Action Ribbon	Selected Marine Corps Reserve Medal	American Defense Service Medal
American Campaign Medal	Asiatic-Pacific Campaign Medal with at least 1 campaign star	World War II Victory Medal

== See also ==
- List of Medal of Honor recipients for World War II
- List of Eagle Scouts
- List of alumni of Clemson University
- List of people from Augusta, Georgia
