= General Rains =

General Rains may refer to:

- Gabriel J. Rains (1803–1881), Confederate States Army brigadier general, inventor of the modern anti-personnel mine
- George Washington Rains (1817–1898), Confederate States Army brigadier general (unconfirmed)
- James Edwards Rains (1833–1862), Confederate States Army brigadier general
- James S. Rains (1817–1880), Missouri State Guard brigadier general

== See also ==
- Julius Raines (1825–1909), British Army general
