= Northern Pacific Railway Depot (Pullman, Washington) =

Historic building in Washington, United States

- Northern Pacific Railway Depot - Pullman
- U.S. National Register of Historic Places
- Washington Heritage Register
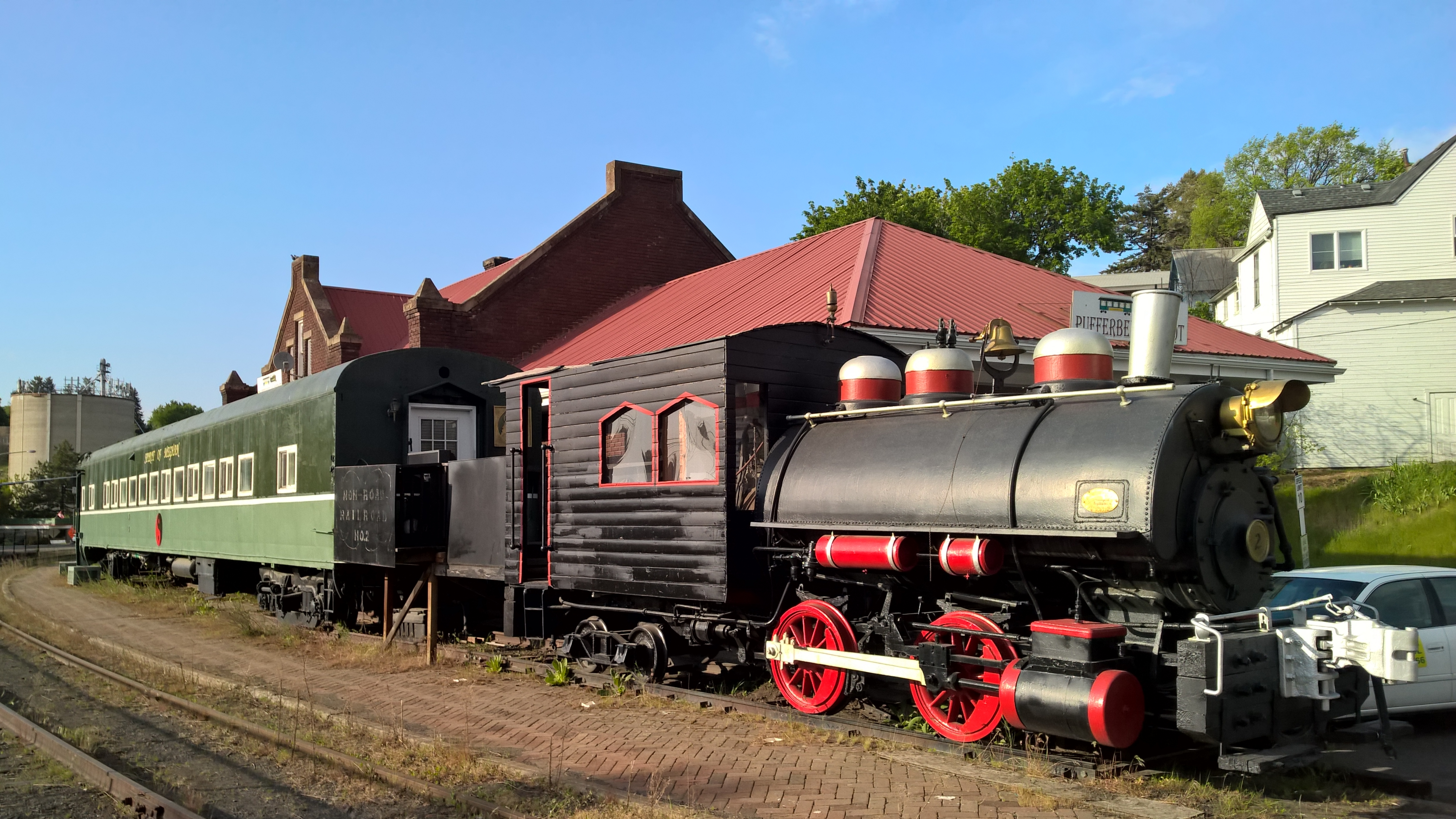

- Location within Washington (state)
- Interactive map of Northern Pacific Railway Depot - Pullman
- Location: 330 N. Grand Ave., Pullman, Washington
- Coordinates: 46°43′53.06″N 117°10′45.76″W
- Built: 1916
- Architect: Jess D. Koren
- Architectural style: Flemish Revival
- NRHP reference No.: 100004328
- WHR No.: 14770
- Added to NRHP: August 26, 2019

The Northern Pacific Railway Depot at Pullman (also called the Pufferbelly Depot and Pullman Depot Heritage Center) is a former railway station listed on both the National Register of Historic Places and Washington Heritage Register. It is owned by the Whitman County Historical Society, and currently houses their Pullman Depot Heritage Center.

== History ==
The depot replaced an older depot built by the Northern Pacific Railway in 1902. The State College of Washington (now called Washington State University) and residents of Pullman, Washington lobbied the railway for a larger depot to meet the transportation needs of the growing town and college. Construction was authorized in 1915, began in June 1916 and was completed in November of that year. An opening ceremony was held on March 9, 1917. The station was designed by Jess Didricksen Koren, a Northern Pacific Railway engineer, and built by the Sound Construction & Engineering Company based in Seattle, Washington. The depot's proximity to the college was an important source of passenger and freight traffic, with the railroad running "Cougar Special" trains to coincide with events like games or the start or end of the term.

The last passenger train departed the combined passenger and freight depot in 1966, but the depot continued to operate as a freight depot, crew changeover point, and operations hub. As Burlington Northern Railroad (which was formed when Northern Pacific merged with three other rail companies) consolidated rail operations, many functions moved from nearby smaller depots to the Pullman depot. Ultimately, Burlington Northern Railroad announced the closure of the depot in 1985, and sold it to a private owner in 1988.

The depot was renovated in 1958, and again in 1988 after the depot was sold. Dan Antoni purchased the depot, and began collecting rolling stock on the property. After his death, the Whitman County Historical Society purchased the depot from his estate, and his parents donating the rolling stock to the Society.

== Restoration ==
The Whitman County Historical Society planned to restore the building and partnered with students at Washington State University's Voiland College of Engineering and Architecture to come up with designs. Early restoration efforts involved relocating some train cars on the property, including transferring one car to the Inland Northwest Rail Museum. Further efforts began in 2021, funded by two grants from the Washington State Historical Society along with other grants and donations totaling $710,000. The first of five planned restoration phases was nearly complete as of September 2024. Restoration work on the site's remaining rolling stock began in 2025. As of July 2025, the Society has raised $95,000 to restore the rolling stock, and more than $2 million to restore the building.

== See also ==
- National Register of Historic Places listings in Whitman County, Washington
