= Battle of Union Gap =

Second engagement of the Yakama War

Coordinates: 46.525°N 120.479°W

- Part of the Yakima War, American Indian Wars
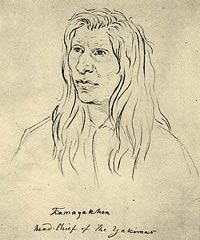
- A drawing of Chief Kamiakin by Gustav Sohon in 1855. Credit: Washington State Historical Society
Date	November 9–10, 1855
Location	Union Gap, Yakima River, Washington
Result	US forces take Union Gap, Yakama escape with entire force and civillian population. See Aftermath

Belligerents
United States	Yakama

Commanders and leaders
(United States) Gabriel J. Rains	Kamiakin

Strength
~700 infantry	~300 warriors

Casualties and losses
2 drowned before main engagement	One noncombatant executed by Cutmouth John(Indian Scout)

The Battle of Union Gap, or the Battle at Union Gap, was the second engagement of the Yakama War, fought on November 9 and 10, 1855. It began when a large force of about 700 American soldiers, under Major Gabriel J. Rains, discovered Chief Kamiakin's village of around 300 braves and several women and children, along the Yakima River. In the following two-day battle only one "non-combatant" was killed by accident and the Yakama men successfully held off the United States Infantry operating under the Department of the Pacifics orders.

Before the Fight

According to Robert Utley in Frontiersman in Blue, native american warriors, especially plains and western basin/Platuea tribes, possessed superb guerrilla tactics and lifelong training but lacked the experience to challenge conventional armies in combined arms and concentrate firepower. This meant the local Platuea/high plains tribes like the Yakama, Okanagan, Cayuse, Wenatchee, Palouse operated primarily as light infantry and light mounted infantry. The United States army in the Pacific was drastically undermanned, and underfunded and poorly equipped. Not receiving real rifled muskets until the very late Battle of Four Lakes. In fact, rifled marksmanship was not even a priority until 1879 to 1885 when the Indian wars were largely concluded. The Columbia Platuea was a coarse and dry environment with very little actual Anglo-American infrastructure DESIGNED to secure grander campaigns during this time. Meaning O'Haller and his troopers were forced to fight with ad-hoc training, minimal funding and poor weaponry against warriors whom despite inexperience with white warfare possessed the attributes and skills appropriate for asymmetric guerrilla tactics, which the tribes possessed. Despite the striking victory, the United States recruited tribal scouts to even the odds tactically and relied on punitive expeditions, not necessarily sparing women and children with the purpose of punishment and ending the asymmetric way of war the tribes practiced. The conflict with the Yakamas is prepared by the Cayuse War, Rogue River War, First Sioux War, California Indian Wars and even the Russo-Tlingit Wars, meaning despite little experience with European conventional tactics they were well aware of what was happening surrounding them. This is proved also by the amount of Yakamas who traveled past the Cascades to assist Chief Leschie and the NISQUALLY in resistance to expansion.

Day One

Following the defeat of Toppenish Creek, the U.S Army was ordered to restore confidence and order in the area and break Yakama resistance in the area. Their main objective was to capture or kill many warriors, capture or kill Kamiakin and the villagers, and destroy tribal infrastructure to force artificial starvation. Much of the main Army column attempted to cross a large stream to chase the Yakama people in pursuit but two men died in the pursuit to non combat related fatalities. The warriors reached the gap where they started actively evacuating people out of the valley entirely, in hopes of reaching north or in the hidden comfort of fellow tribes.

Day two

Raines and the Army set up to besiege the warriors at the site of Union Gap, or twin buttes. This is one of the first large scale uses of artillery and combined rifle fire used against Native American Warriors this far west, which shocked the warriors who had not seriously witnessed much firepower due to the region only just recently encountering European powers. The prediction was that inexperience against combined arms firepower due to Yakamas operating primarily as asymmetric light infantry would mean their doctrine of asymmetric tribal warfare would not sustain siege warfare. However despite the firepower superiority the Gap itself provided immense cover, due to the fact not a single Yakama brave died or was even wounded in the entire two days of fighting. Stone breastwork structure was obliterated by artillery fire but the warriors well concealed farther up the gap. Due to superior cover, they were able to halt all charges and offenses without taking a single casualty. But the U.S Infantry started to break down the area and the Yakama, likely suffering from shortages of ammunition and supplies had to abandon the gap and go guard their traveling families.

Aftermath

The Yakama warriors had to abandon the gap, a traditional stronghold, but successfully held off a superior force with zero combatants casualties and with their women and children.[1] Many tribes blamed the Yakama for instigating trouble with European Americans in the area. The Army successfully burned some local good caches and even allegedly gunpowder from accused allied Catholics in the area. In spite of this tactical defeat and localized attrition, Chief Kamiakin managed to evacuate every single person, continue the war effort, endure no casualties, and recruit many of the major tribes to fight for his side in the upcoming phases of the war. A young Lt. Sheridan before his fame called the expedition and Raines leadership a wretched failure. The notion of a tactical defeat primarily rests on the assumption it was a traditional seigle battle the Yakama lost to withdraw, but the evacuation of non-combatants and not even suffering a single

== See also ==
- Cayuse War
- Whitman Massacre
