= Whitman County Historical Society =

Historical society in Whitman County

- Formation: 1972
- Type: Historical Society, Museum
- Legal status: 501(c)(3) Non-Profit Organization
- Purpose: Historical Preservation, Education
- Website: www.whitmancountyhistoricalsociety.org

The Whitman County Historical Society is a historical society in Whitman County, Washington. It manages several historic properties in Colfax, Washington, Pullman, Washington and Palouse, Washington. Its properties include a former church, cabin and home that followed, and a train depot.

In 1980, it published a guide to it oral history collection. The interviews were done between November, 1977 and October, 1978 by Margot Knight and Kay Kenedy Turner. They were used for a series of radio programs. A collection of materials related to the 118 interviews of community elders is held by the Washington State University Libraries in Pullman, Washington and includes materials from 1977 and 1984. The recordings were digitized from 2012-2015. It affiliates with the Lost Apple Project.

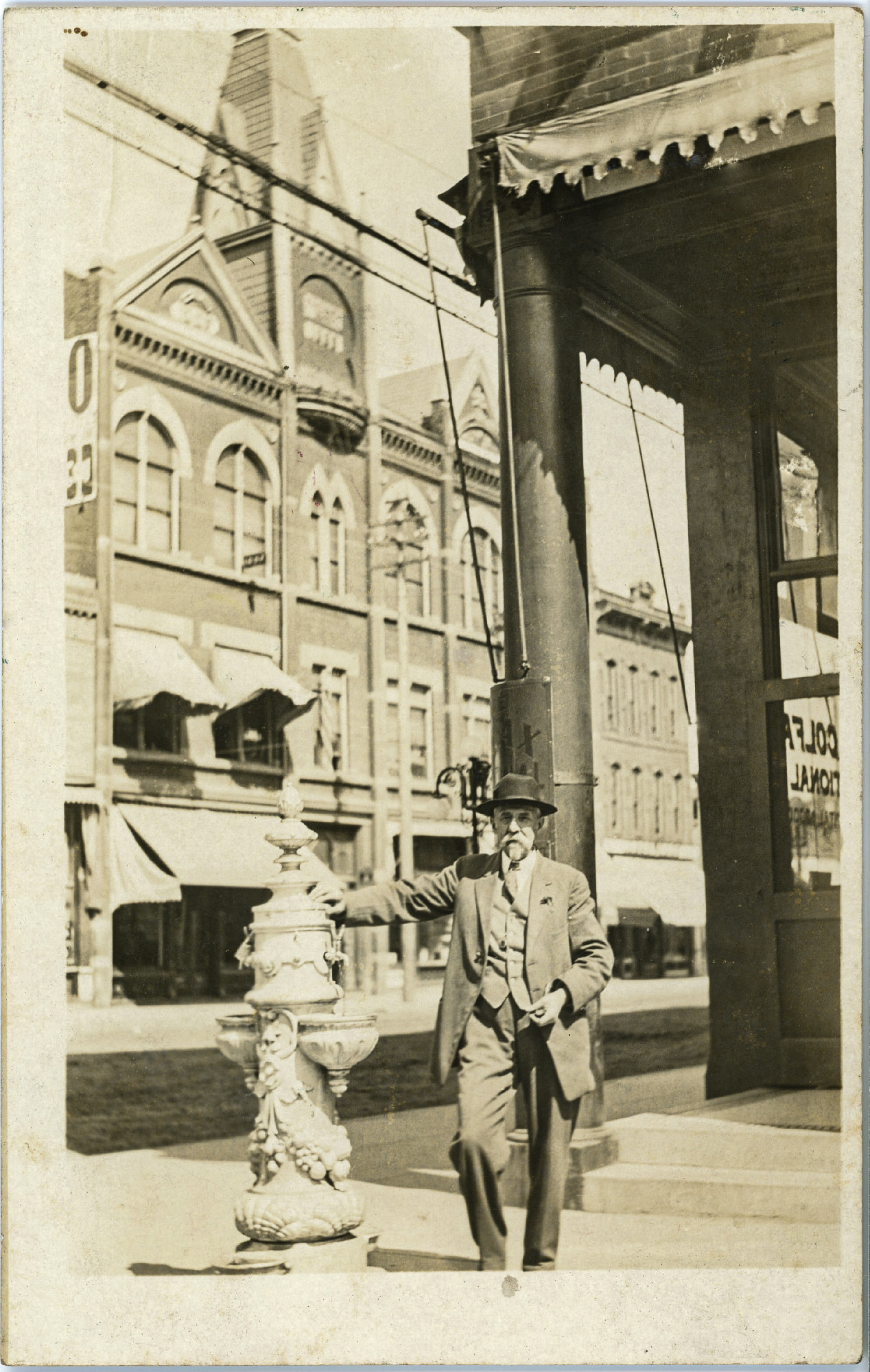
A 1902 postcard of a brass water fountain in Colfax

The Society owns and manages Holy Trinity Episcopal Church (Palouse, Washington), giving tours and hosting events at it. In 2018, the society acquired the Northern Pacific Railway Depot at Pullman and as of 2025 was raising funds to restore buildings and rolling stock.

== Properties ==
The Society maintains several properties on the National Register of Historic Places in Whitman County.

- Holy Trinity Episcopal Church (Palouse, Washington)
- Perkins House and Cabin
- Northern Pacific Railway Depot (Pullman, Washington)

Additionally, the Society has taken on the project to restore the St. Ignatius Hospital in Colfax.

== Gallery ==
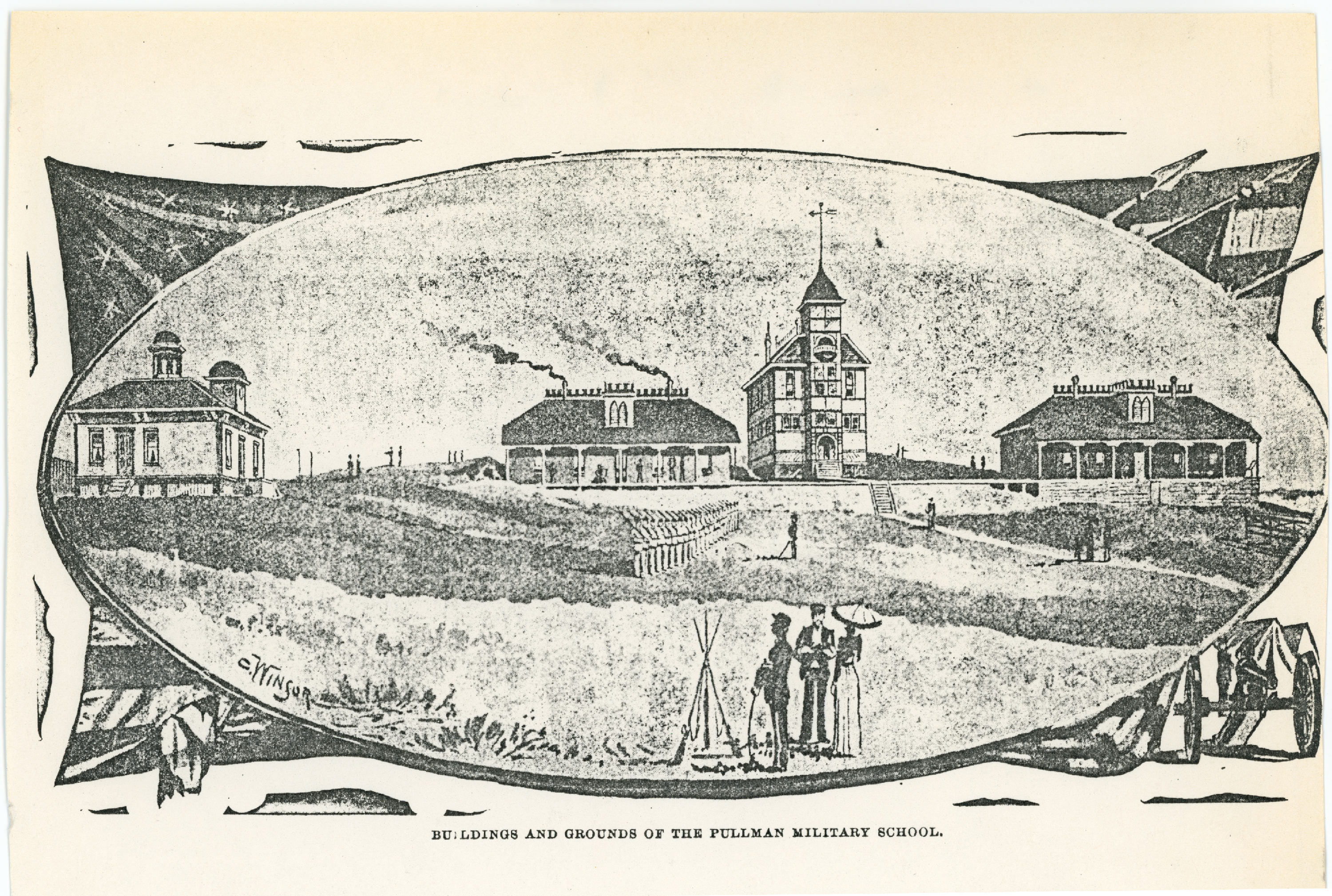
Pullman Military School

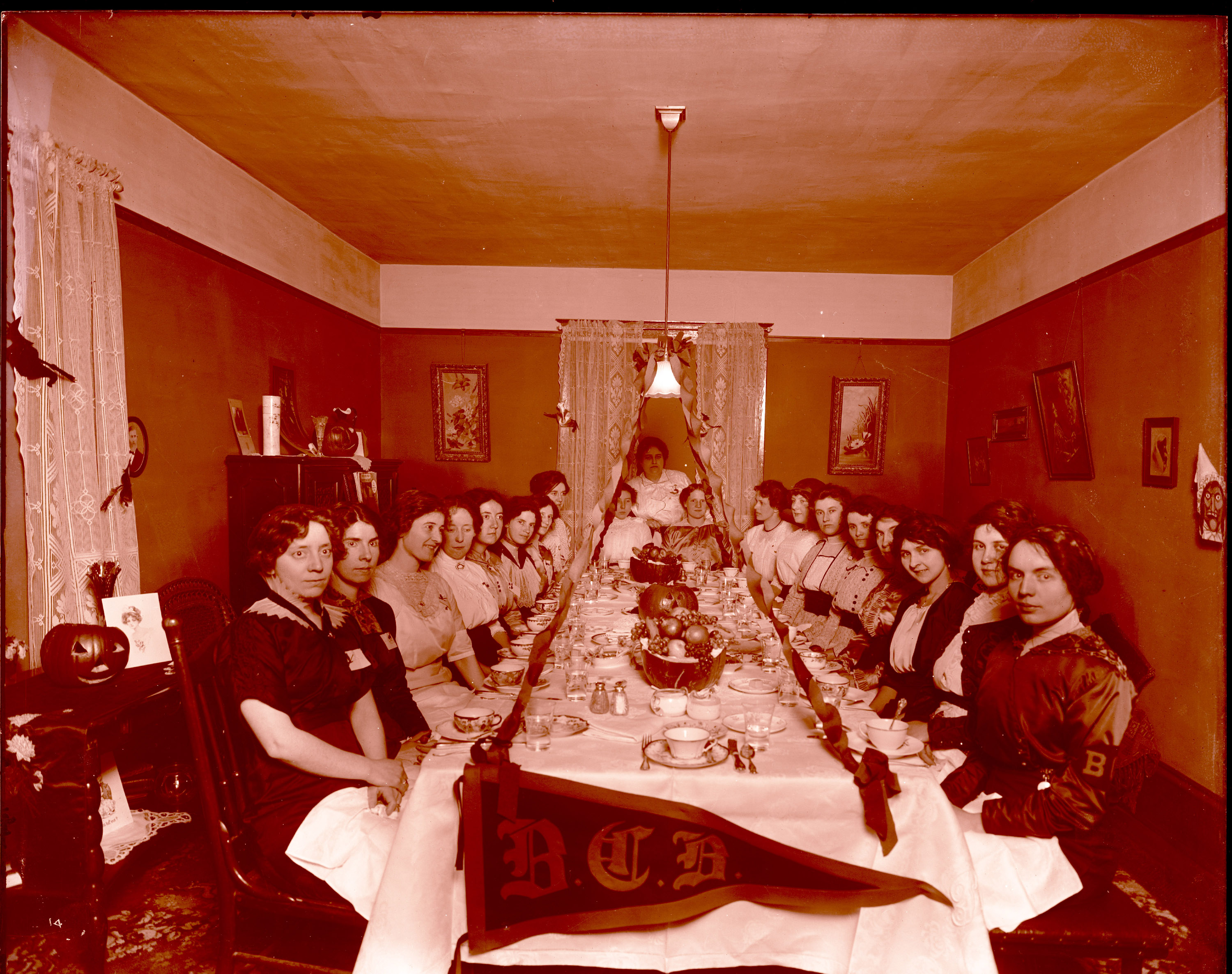
A scary good time at the B.C.B. Halloween party

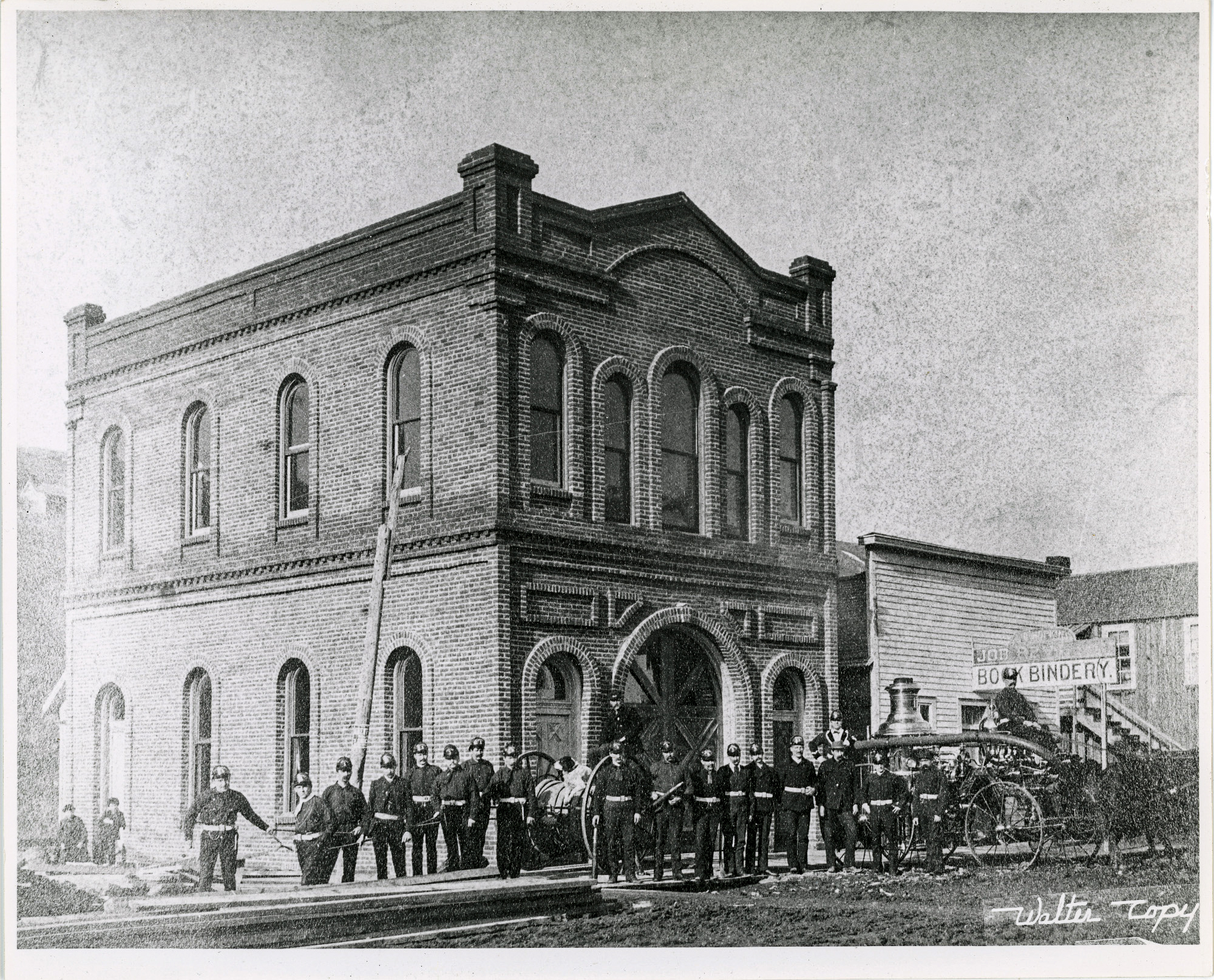
Manning the Colfax fire department on Main Street next to a book bindery

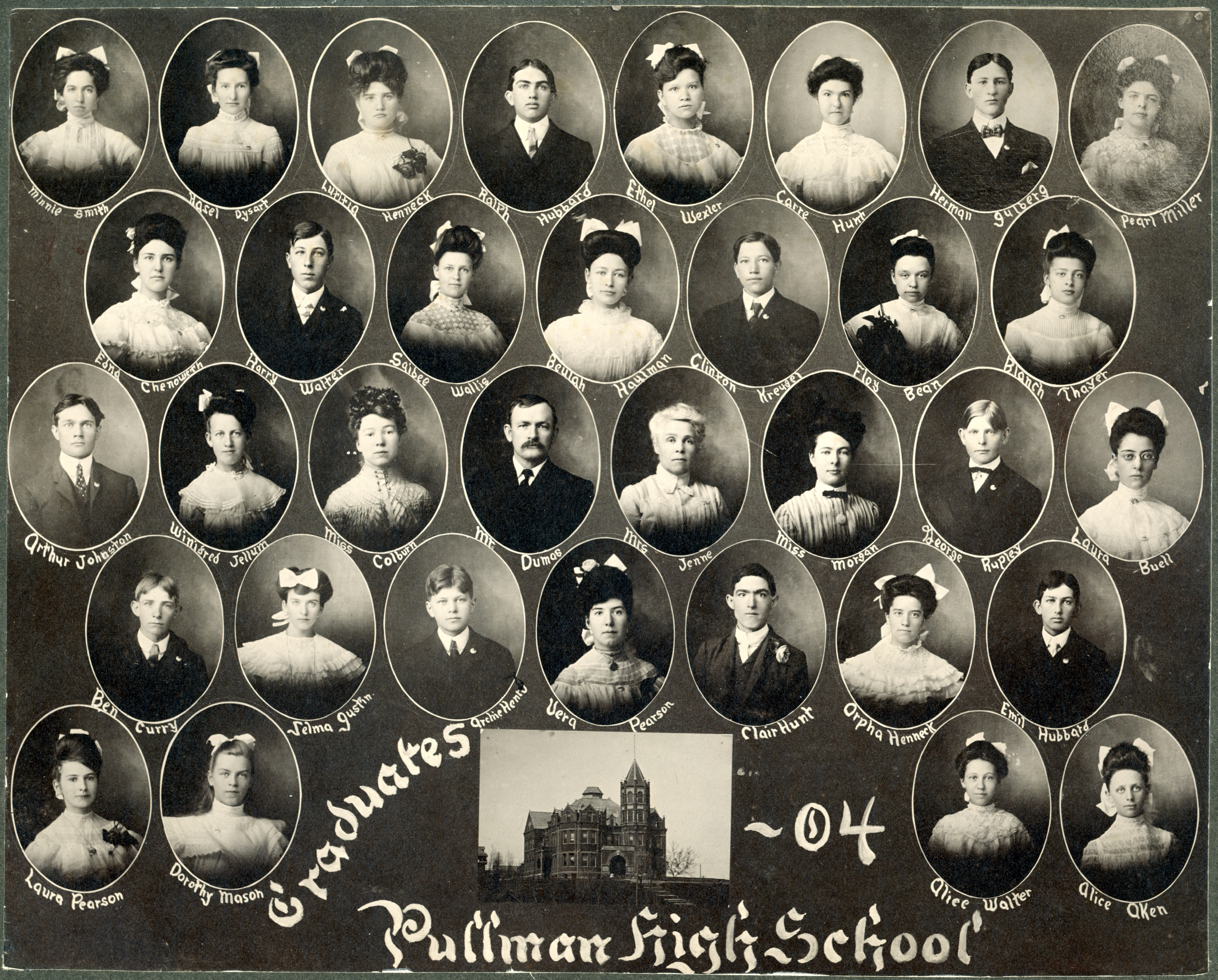
Pullman High School class of 1904

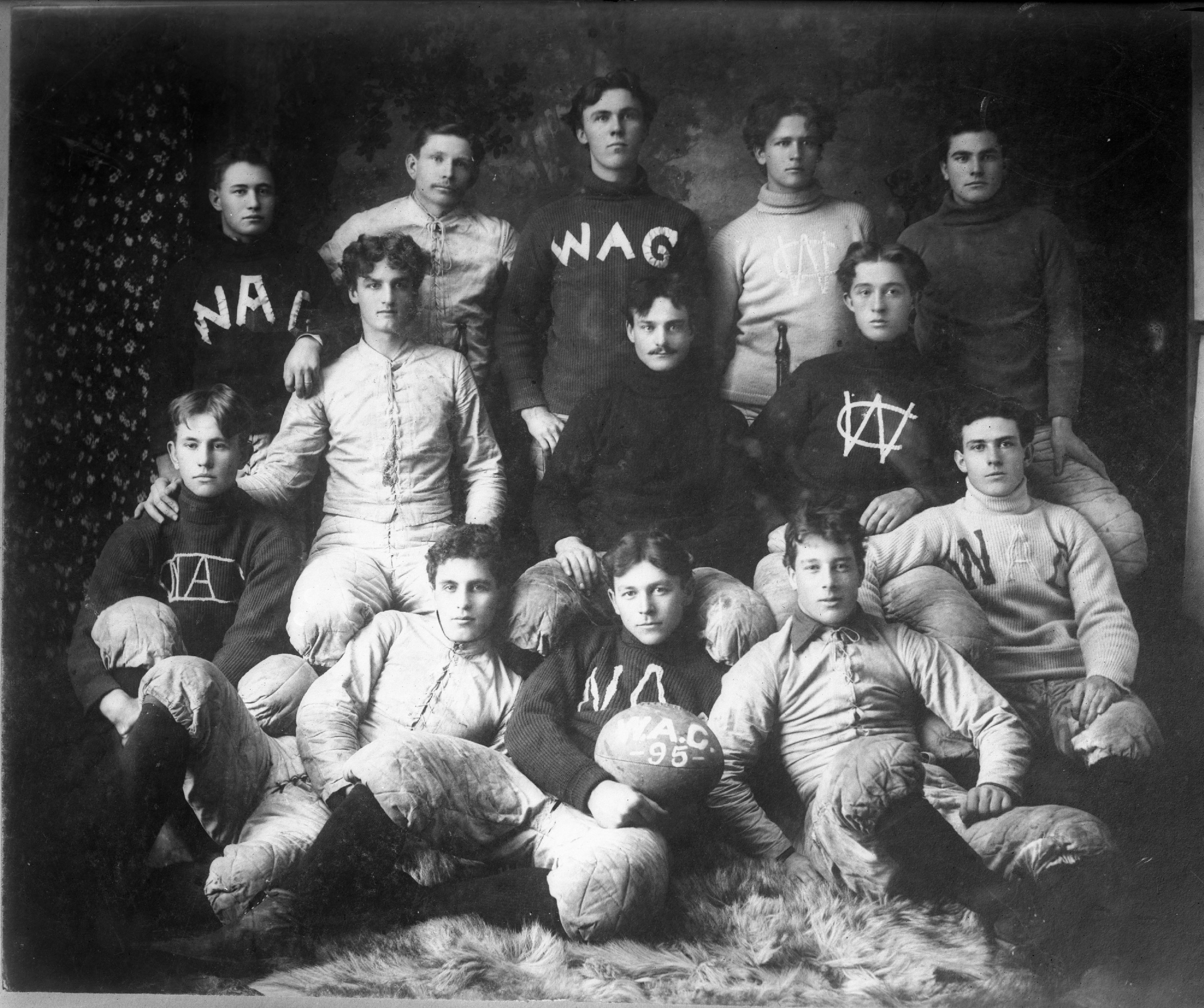
H. C. Bilger's photograph of the WAC football team in 1895

== See also ==
- List of historical societies in Washington (state)
