= List of historical societies in Washington (state) =

The following is a list of historical societies in the state of Washington, United States.

== Organizations ==
- Adams County Historical Society
- Asotin County Historical Society
- Ballard Historical Society
- Benton County Historical Society
- Chelan County Historical Society
- Clark County Historical Society
- Columbia County Historical Society
- Cowlitz County Historical Society
- Darrington Historical Society
- Douglas County Historical Society
- East Benton County Historical Society
- Eastern Washington State Historical Society
- Fall City Historical Society
- Fern Hill Historical Society
- Ferry County Historical Society
- Franklin County Historical Society
- Garfield County Historical Society
- Granite Falls Historical Society
- Grant County Historical Society
- Grays Harbor County Historical Society
- Island County Historical Society
- Jefferson County Historical Society
- King County Historical Society
- Kiona-Benton City Historical Society
- Kitsap County Historical Society
- Kittitas County Historical Society
- Klickitat County Historical Society
- Lake Stevens Historical Society
- Lewis County Historical Society
- Lincoln County Historical Society
- Magnolia Historical Society
- Maple Valley Historical Society
- Marysville Historical Society
- Mason County Historical Society
- Medical Lake Historical Society
- Mercer Island Historical Society
- Monroe Historical Society
- Mukilteo Historical Society
- Newcastle Historical Society
- North Olympic History Center (formerly Clallam County Historical Society)
- Okanogan County Historical Society
- Olympia Historical Society
- Pacific County Historical Society
- Pend Oreille County Historical Society
- Pierce County Historical Society
- Puget Sound Maritime Historical Society
- Queen Anne Historical Society
- San Juan County Historical Society
- Seattle Historical Society
- Skagit County Historical Society
- Skamania County Historical Society
- Sky Valley Historical Society
- Skykomish Historical Society
- Snohomish County Historical Society
- Spokane County Historical Society
- Stanwood Area Historical Society
- Stevens County Historical Society
- Thurston County Historical Society
- Wahkiakum County Historical Society
- Walla Walla County Historical Society
- Washington State Historical Society
- Whatcom County Historical Society
- White River Valley Historical Society
- Whitman County Historical Society
- Yakima County Historical Society
- Yakima Valley Historical Society

== See also ==
- History of Washington (state)
- List of museums in Washington (state)
- National Register of Historic Places listings in Washington state
- List of historical societies in the United States
