= Holy Trinity Episcopal Church (Palouse, Washington) =

Historic church in Washington, United States

- U.S. National Register of Historic Places
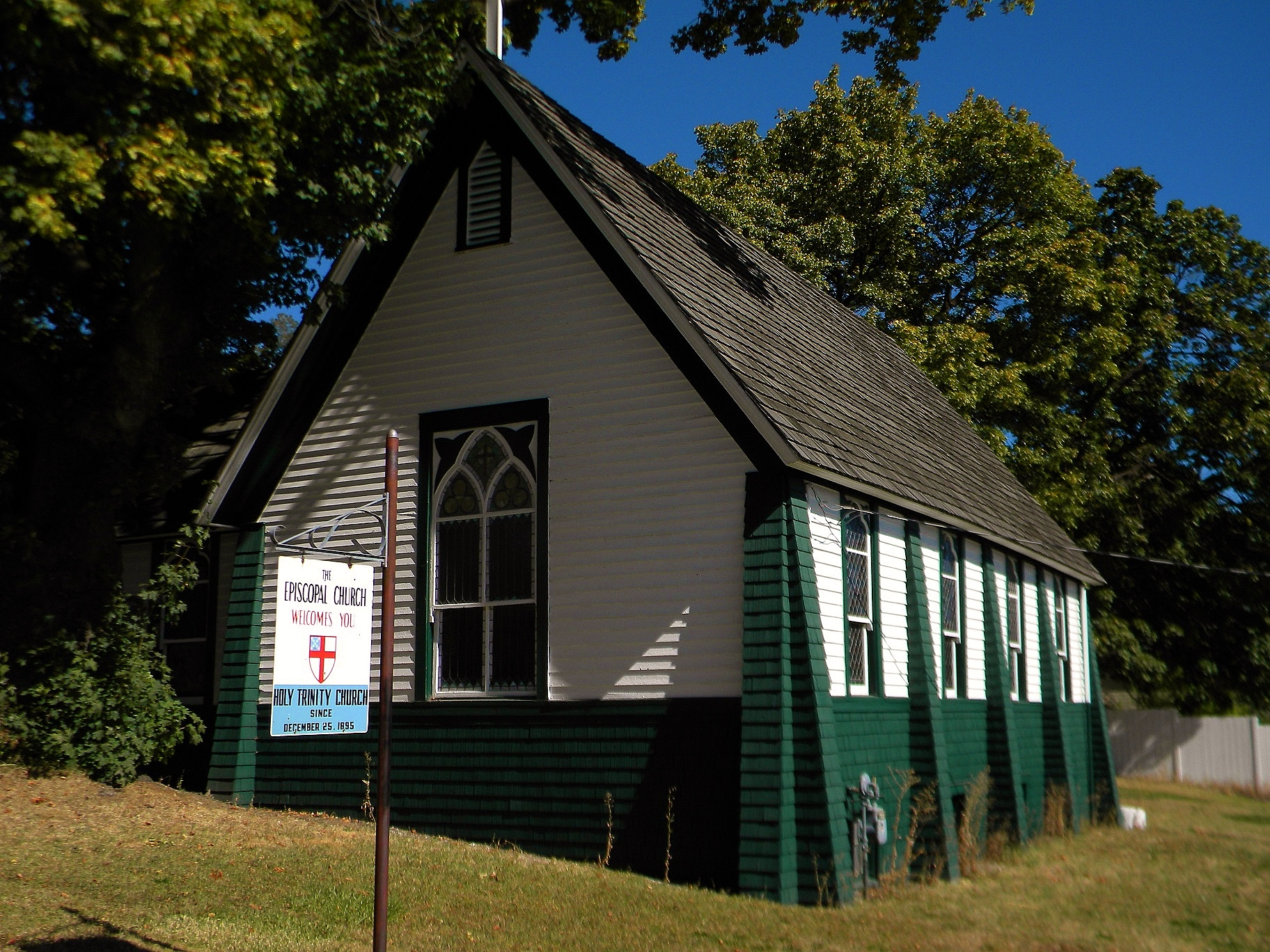

- Location within Washington (state)
- Location: 105 E. Alder St., Palouse, Washington
- Coordinates: 46°54′50″N 117°4′37″W
- Area: less than one acre
- Built: 1895
- Architect: John P. Duke
- Architectural style: Gothic Revival
- NRHP reference No.: 05000249
- Added to NRHP: March 30, 2005

Holy Trinity Episcopal Church is a historic church at 105 E. Alder Street in Palouse, Washington. It was built in 1895 and was added to the National Register in 2005. The chapel has one of the seven lichgates in the United States. From 1896 through 2003 services were held at the chapel until the Episcopal Diocese of Spokane sold the building to the Whitman County Historical Society, a historical society which gives tours by request and rents out the building for weddings, funeral services, local church services, recitals, and cultural presentations.
