= Nitre and Mining Bureau =

The Confederate Nitre and Mining Bureau was a civilian government bureau to provide the Confederate States of America with needed materials such as copper, iron, lead, saltpeter, sulfur, zinc, and other metals. The Bureau oversaw civilian contracts and offered advice, instruction and guidance in the production of these materials. The Nitre and Mining Bureau was also known as the "CSNMB", the "Bureau of Nitre" or the "Nitre Bureau". The Niter and Mining Corps was the military division of the Bureau. The Nitre and Mining Bureau was part of the Confederate Ordnance Department, under the supervision of General Josiah Gorgas. The Nitre and Mining Bureau was supervised by General Isaac M. St. John. The Central Ordinance Laboratory was headed by John Mallet.

== Personnel ==
The Act establishing the Nitre and Mining Bureau by the Confederate Congress stated: "That said bureau shall consist of one lieutenant colonel as superintendent, three majors as assistant superintendents, six captains and ten lieutenants, in which shall be included the officers of the present nitre corps, who shall have the same pay and allowances prescribed for officers of cavalry of the same grades." General Isaac M. St. John was subsequently made the superintendent of the bureau. Other individuals involved with or associated with the Nitre and Mining Bureau included George Washington Rains, Joseph LeConte, Nathaniel Thomas Lupton, Richard Sears McCulloh, George Washington Helme, and Thomas Edgeworth Courtenay.

== Saltpeter ==
The Nitre and Mining Bureau is most known for their production of saltpeter (potassium nitrate) for the Confederacy. Because of the blockade of Southern ports, imported supplies of gunpowder and materials were kept away from the Confederacy, and had to be supplied within their own borders. Priority was given to the manufacture of gunpowder. The Secretary of War for the Confederate States said: "That Military commanders are directed and officers of the Niter Bureau are authorized to seize niter in the hands of private individuals who either decline to sell it or ask more than 50 cents per pound for it.... All quartermasters are directed to give precedence in transportation to niter over all other Government stores. Richmond, April 15, 1862."

Civilian production of saltpeter was encouraged by small farm holders, tobacco and livestock owners, from cave dirt and other resources.

=== Barn dirt ===
Several pamphlets were printed by the Confederate Nitre and Mining Bureau to explain how loose dirt from ricks, smoke houses, barns and tobacco curing buildings could be treated to extract the nitrates.

=== Cave dirt ===
Cave dirt was mined to produce calcium nitrate, which would be combined with potash to create potassium nitrate, a needed ingredient of gunpowder. Lookout Mountain Caverns, the Morrell Cave in Sullivan County, Tennessee, Nickajack Cave, Organ Cave and Selma, Alabama's limestone caves all supplied nitrates for the Nitre and Mining Bureau.

=== Nitre beds ===
Joseph LeConte, a professor of chemistry and geology at South Carolina University, wrote a pamphlet for the Nitre Bureau on the process for the manufacture of saltpeter in 1862. Nitre beds were constructed of a clay floor, well rammed, that was impervious to water, but with a drain to remove the fluids. Then black earth was added to a raised bed over this floor, made of dark manure. Twigs, leaves and other elements were added to create air passages and porosity through the dirt. A shed would be built around and over the heap to protect it from wind and rain. "The heap is watered every week with the richest kinds of liquid manure, such as urine, dung-water, water of privies, cess-pools, drains, &c." As the heap ripens, the saltpeter is brought to the surface.

=== Night soil ===
Desperate for saltpeter necessary for the making of gunpowder, the Confederacy sent out agents around the South to collect deposits of "night soil", i.e. human excrement. John Haralson, an agent in Selma, Alabama of the Confederate Nitre and Mining Bureau, advertised the following in the local paper: "The ladies of Selma are respectfully requested to preserve the chamber lye [i.e. urine] collected about their premises for the purpose of making nitre. A barrel will be sent around daily to collect it."

=== Gunpowder works ===
The Confederate Powderworks in Augusta, Georgia, was used to manufacture gunpowder from the saltpeter, charcoal and sulfur produced by the Confederate Nitre and Mining Bureau.

== Iron production ==
The Nitre and Mining Bureau was responsible for the mining, refining and production of iron.

Because the production of iron was so important, the Bureau sent out information on the need to enforce the existing contracts with civilian companies and individuals.

== Lead, silver and zinc production ==
Lead and zinc were needed by the Confederate War Department for the manufacture of weapons and ammunition.

Some of the lead and zinc was mined in Arkansas and Missouri. "At the outbreak of the war, Confederate troops seized the rich Granby lead mines of southwest Missouri, then touted as able to provide all the lead needed for the Confederate cause. In 1861, 75,000 pounds of pig lead a month were being hauled overland to Van Buren (Crawford County), to be shipped to the Memphis, Tennessee, ordnance works. The loss of Missouri to the Union following the Battle of Pea Ridge in Arkansas effectively meant losing this important war materiel source. The Confederate Nitre and Mining Bureau mined lead and saltpeter (an ingredient in gunpowder) in Newton, Marion, Pulaski, and Sevier counties. However, these operations proved too close to enemy lines and were soon abandoned for more secure sources in Texas."

Lead was also mined in North Carolina. The silver had to be separated from the lead ores, which was an expensive process. The Nitre and mining Bureau took over the Silver Hill, North Carolina mines production. "In the opening stages of the war, geologists and government agents underscored the value and scope of Silver Hill's lead deposits, initially renting Mines for six hundred dollars per month. Outside a well known mine in Wytheville, Silver Hill was the only other large-quantity mine in the southeast, and, with its machinery and facilities already in place, it made an important acquisition for the new government."

Lead was also mined in Wytheville, Virginia, operated by the Union Lead Company. This lead mine supplied one fourth to one third of the lead used by the Confederate States, and was a principal target of the Wytheville Raid.

The Nitre and Mining Bureau also looked for "lost silver mines" near Camden, Arkansas. These legends dated from the early years of the state, but the Confederacy was desperate enough to try to find these legendary mines.

== See also ==
- Confederate Secret Service

== Publications ==
- Confederate States of America. A Bill to Establish a Nitre and Mining Bureau. [Richmond]: [publisher not identified], 1863. OCLC: 19659275.
- Confederate States of America. Nitre and Mining Bureau. Message of the President ... Feb. 15, 1865 and Communication From Secretary of War Transmitting a Report From the Chief of the Nitre And Mining Bureau. Richmond, 1865. "Iron Industry and Trade." "Information ... relative to the number of iron furnaces and forges worked by agents of the government or by contractors, during the year 1864, and to the cost per ton of the several kinds of iron furnished by them."
- Confederate States of America. General Orders. [Amendment to General Orders, No. 72 of 1962 Pertaining to Certificates of Disability and Regulations Authorizing the Superintendent of the Nitre and Mining Bureau to Enforce Existing Contracts of the Government in Iron, Lead and Other Munitions] No. 14 No. 14. Richmond: The Office, 1863.
- Confederate States of America. 1863. Nitre and Mining Bureau.. Circular C. S. War Department, Nitre and Mining Bureau, Richmond, Dec. 1, 1863..
- Confederate States of America, Nathaniel A. Pratt, and B. A. Stovall. Nitre and Mining Bureau, 2nd District Letter Book. 1864. Abstract: The collection consists of a letter book of official correspondence for the 2nd District (South Carolina, Georgia, Florida, and Alabama) of the Nitre and Mining Bureau of the Confederate States of America from October 1864 - April 1865. The correspondence, invoices, receipts, and accounts document the activities of the Bureau and contain information regarding a fire (October 1864) that destroyed the Bureau's Augusta (Ga.) headquarters and the ensuing problems re-establishing the laboratory, shipments received and sent, problems obtaining equipment and supplies, and chemical experiments with nitre and potash. The letter book also contains some descriptions of Confederate and Union troop movements, battles, and actions of the Confederate government. Most of the correspondence was written by either Nathaniel A. Pratt or Capt. B.A. Stovall. OCLC: 38476479.
- Confederate States of America, and Samuel Cooper. General Orders. [Regulations Pertaining to Assignments and Military Orders for Nitre and Mining Corps] No. 18 No. 18. Richmond: s.n, 1864.
- Gorsuch, R. B., and William Richardson Hunt. [Facts Bearing Upon the Production of Pig-Metal in the Blast-Furnace, and Upon the Process of Re-Melting It in the Cupelo]. [Selma, Ala.]: [publisher not identified], 1863.
- Leconte, Joseph. 1862. "Instructions for the Manufacture of Saltpetre." 14 pages. Columbia, S.C. Charles P. Pelham, State Printer. 1862. "Published by authority of the executive council under direction of Col. James Chestnut Jr., chief of Military Department." " This pamphlet is issued with the view of supplying information to those who may be inclined to engage in the production of saltpetre. As the refinement will require a process much more difficult and expensive, the State will undertake that. Private enterprise can thus readily furnish the crude material, which the State will purchase at a fair price, and prepare for all the uses required."

== Bibliography ==
- "Contributions to the history of the Confederate Ordnance Department." Southern Historical Society Papers. Volume 12.
- Donnelly, Ralph W. 1956. "Scientists of the Confederate Nitre and Mining Bureau". Civil War History. 2, no. 4: 69–92.
- James J. Johnston and James J. Johnson. 1990. Bullets for Johnny Reb: Confederate Nitre and Mining Bureau in Arkansas. The Arkansas Historical Quarterly, Vol. 49, No. 2 (Summer, 1990), pp. 124–167.
- Glenna R. Schroeder. 1986. "We Will Support the Govt. to the Bitter End": The Augusta Office of the Confederate Nitre and Mining Bureau." The Georgia Historical Quarterly. Vol. 70, No. 2 (Summer, 1986), pp. 288-305.
- Marion O. Smith. 1995. "Confederate Nitre Bureau Operations in Florida." The Florida Historical Quarterly. Vol. 74, No. 1 (Summer, 1995), pp. 40–46.
