= Augusta Arsenal =

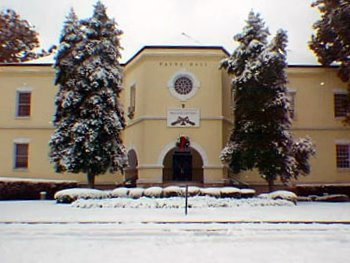
- The Augusta Arsenal's original Headquarters Building, dating back to 1827–29. Now Payne Hall at Augusta University.
- Interactive map of Augusta Arsenal
- Location: Augusta, Georgia
- Coordinates: 33.47615°N 82.02426°W
- Founded: 1816
- Built: 1827–29
- Built for: Government of the United States
- Governing body: State of Georgia

The Augusta Arsenal was a 19th-century fortification in Augusta, Georgia. Established in 1816 and initially completed on the Georgia bank of the Savannah River in 1819, it was moved to the former Belle Vue estate in the Summerville neighborhood of Augusta in 1827 due to health concerns after several fever epidemics.

== Early history ==
The Belle Vue estate was established by George and Eliza Talbot Walker. It was the birthplace of their granddaughter, Octavia Walton Le Vert in 1811. George later sold Belle Vue to his brother, Freeman Walker, for use as a summer estate. Freeman Walker sold the 72 acres (29 ha) property, with the exception of one acre that contained the Walker Family Cemetery, to the United States government for $6,000 in 1826. The arsenal was moved to the new location the following year, with four large brick buildings connected by a twenty-two inch thick wall completed in 1829.

The arsenal served as a temporary refuge for troops from Cantonment Oglethorpe near Savannah, who relocated to Augusta Arsenal during the months May to November from 1829 to 1831 to escape the deadly fever season that had killed over 100 soldiers. The seasonal relocation strategy to Augusta Arsenal helped reduce deaths until permanent new barracks were constructed within Savannah in 1835.

Troops from the arsenal took part in various campaigns involving the Cherokee, Muscogee, and Seminole tribes and took part in the Mexican–American War.

== Civil War ==
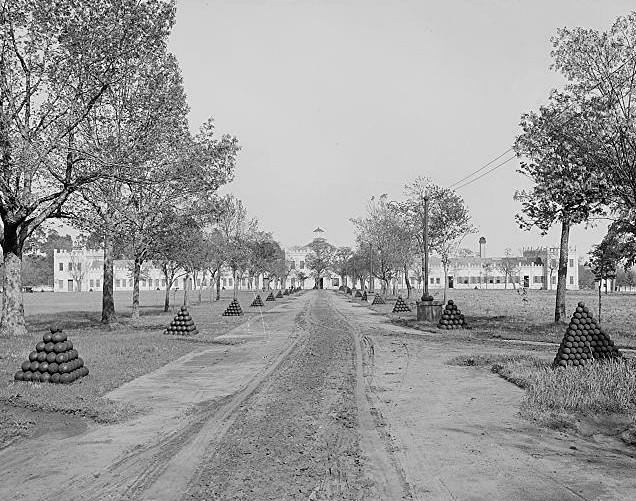
The expanded Augusta Arsenal in the first decade of the 20th century.

Following the secession of Georgia from the Union, then governor, Joseph E. Brown, visited the arsenal on January 23, 1861, and demanded that the commander, Arnold Elzey surrender the facility to the state. Elzey initially refused. 600 citizens of Augusta then volunteered for militia duty based on rumors that the state was going to take the arsenal from Elzey and his small contingent of 82 soldiers. Brown gave Elzey a second chance to surrender the facility, demanding an answer by 9 o'clock the next morning. After notifying his superiors of the situation via telegraph, Elzey turned the arsenal over to the state the next day.

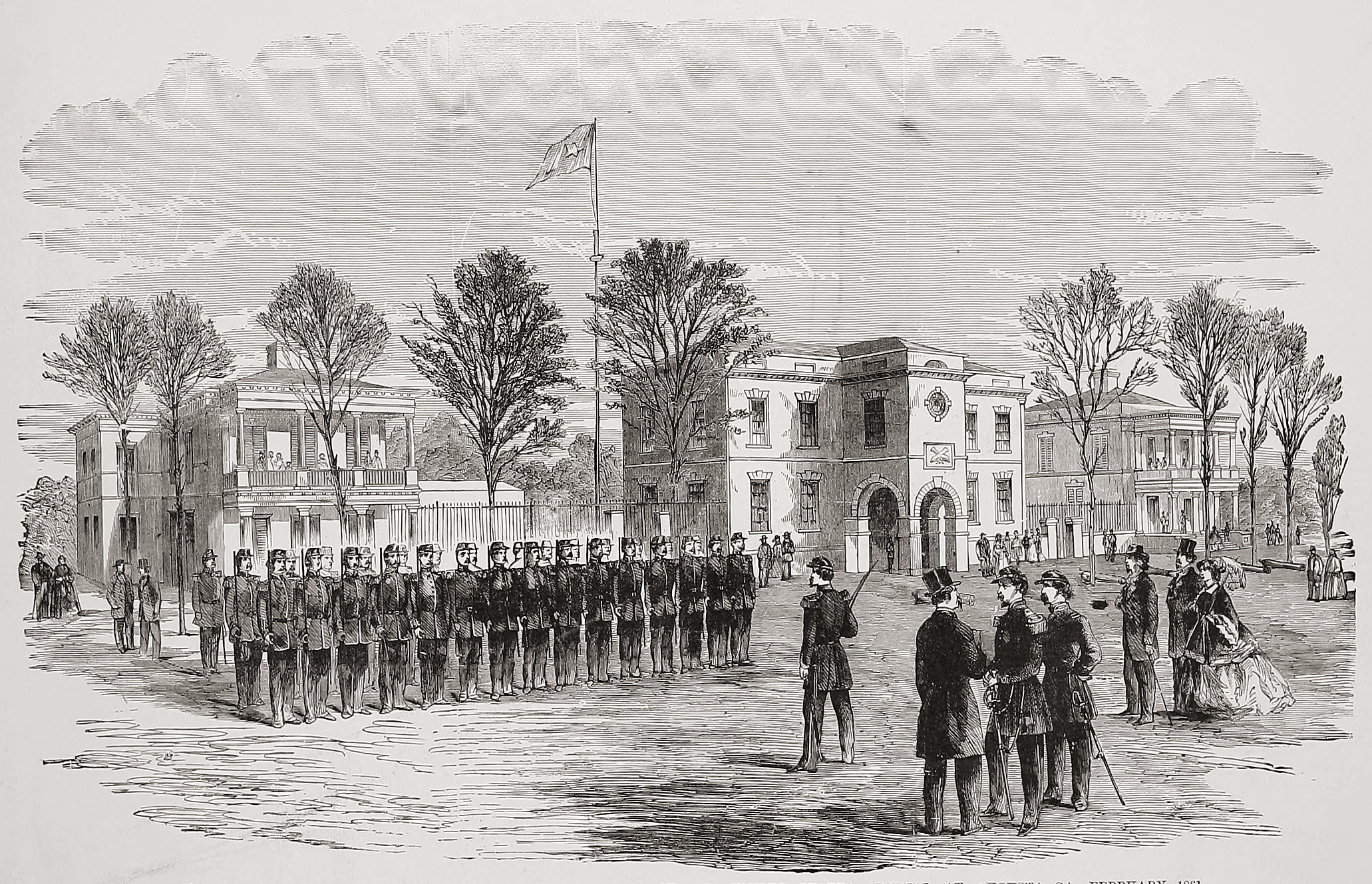
Review of the Clinch Rifles on the Parade Ground in front of the Augusta Arsenal in February 1861.

By summer 1861, the Confederate Chief of Ordnance, Josiah Gorgas, determined to greatly expand the arsenal around the original nucleus. His plans included building a "great arsenal of construction where ammunition, field and siege artillery projectiles and ordnance stores in general [would] be made in large quantities." April 1862 saw the arsenal placed under the command of Lieutenant Colonel George Washington Rains. He was also put in charge of erecting the enormous Confederate Powderworks, which he placed at the 1816 arsenal site. The arsenal produced large quantities of war materiel from 1863 to 1865. The arsenal was under threat in November 1864 during Sherman's March to the Sea, with equipment prepared for evacuation until the Union Army turned toward Savannah. In the end, the arsenal was surrendered back to Federal control when Union troops entered Augusta on May 3, 1865. The Augusta Arsenal is still the home to three Confederate "12-pounder Napoleon" cannons. Two of the cannons are displayed at the front and rear of Payne Hall, which is the original arsenal headquarters building, and a third is displayed outside the original arsenal guardhouse. The arsenal guardhouse was erected in 1866 to guard the entrance to the arsenal. In 2004 it was converted to a small museum that displays dozens of artifacts, photographs, and various items uncovered during archeological excavations of the area. The arsenal military cemetery, adjacent to the Walker Family cemetery, houses the graves of forty-eight soldiers, twelve women, and ten children, along with a few unidentified graves, dating back to 1841.

Stereograph of Augusta Arsenal, Augusta, Georgia

== Later history ==
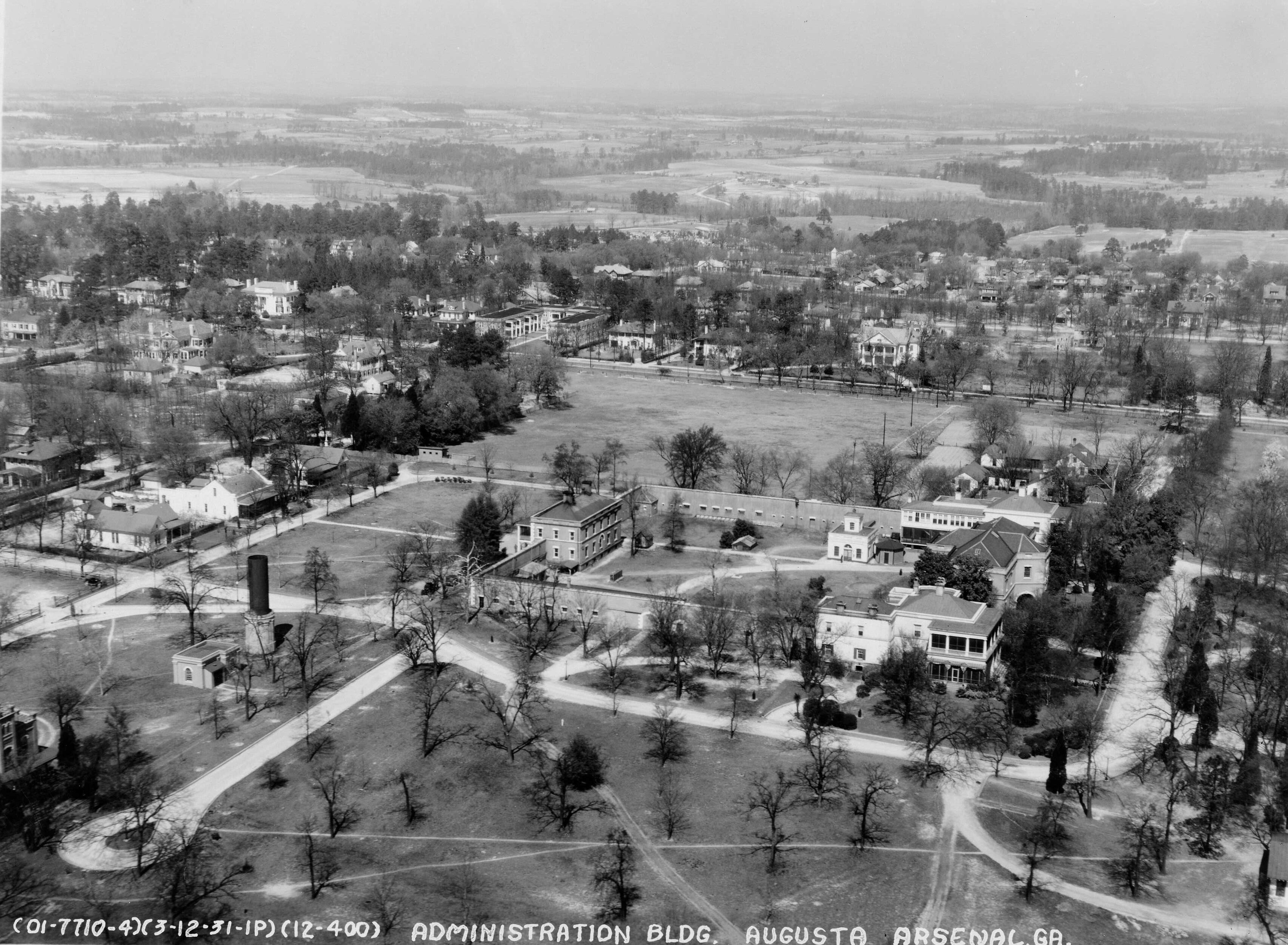
Augusta Arsenal, 1931

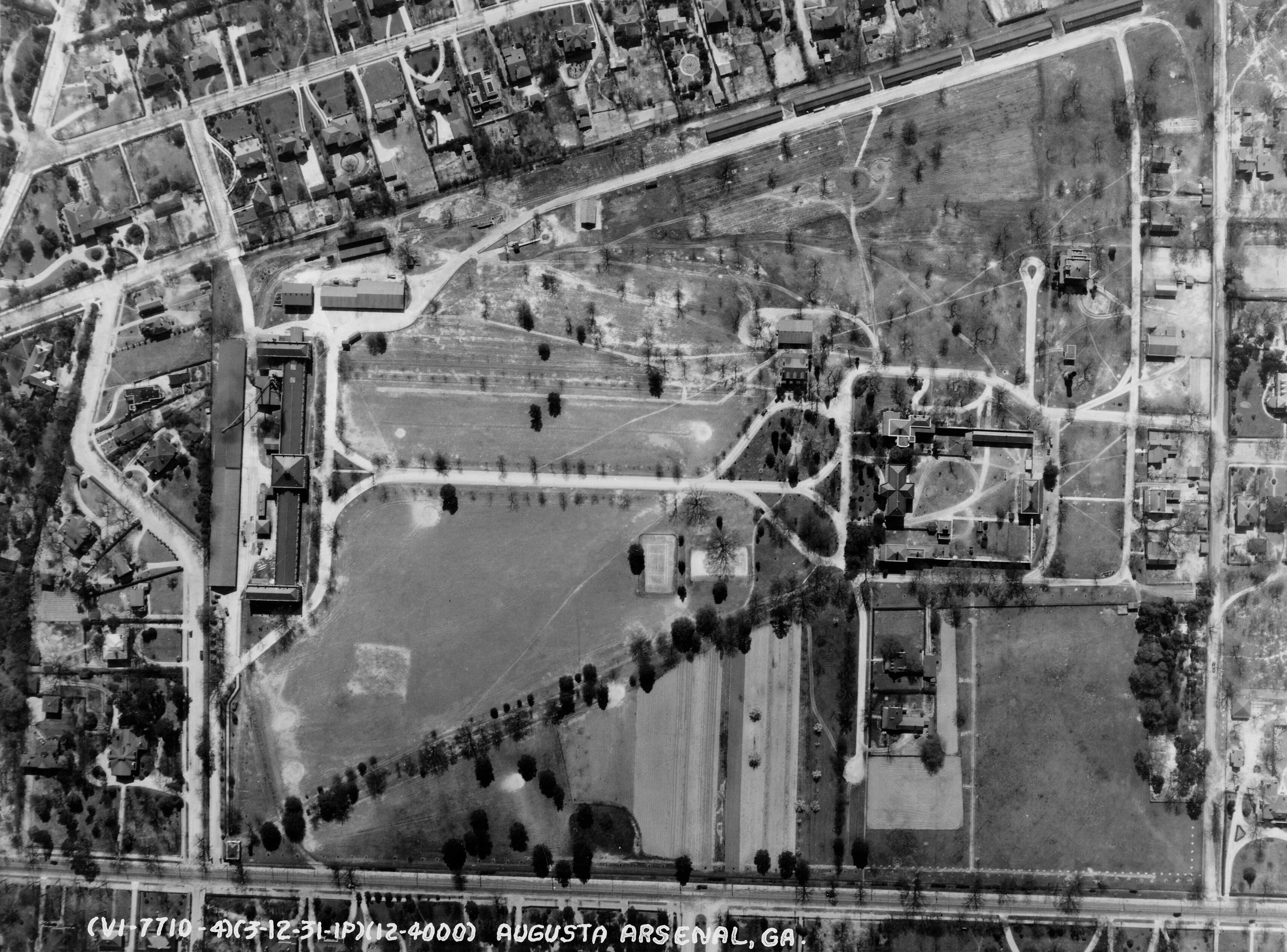
Augusta Arsenal, 1931

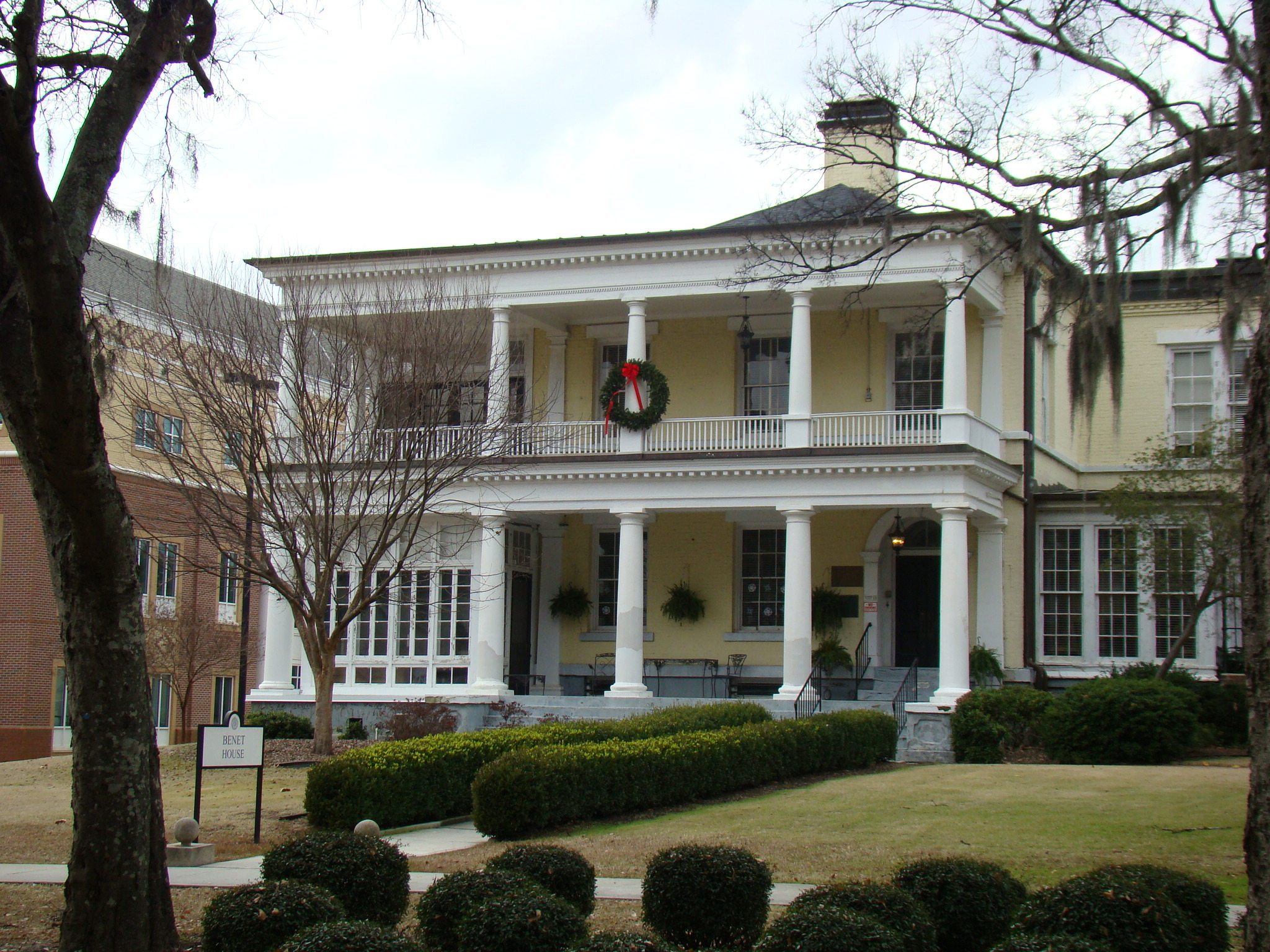
The Stephen Vincent Benét House in 2008.

The arsenal was a valuable asset for the war effort during the Spanish–American War. It manufactured various types of equipment and served as a supply and repair point. During World War I the arsenal served as a center for the repair of small arms. Following minimum staffing after close of World War I, World War II saw activity at the site increase enormously, with the construction of roughly fifty new buildings. Primary activities were directed at maintenance and supply of weapons and ammunition, with over 1000 people working at the arsenal.

The arsenal remained in operation until 1955, at which point the decision was made to close it. Most of the property was given to the Georgia Board of Education. It was converted into the Junior College of Augusta in 1957. The name was changed to Augusta College in 1958, and later as Augusta State University. In 2012, Augusta State University merged with Georgia Health Sciences University to become Georgia Regents University. After much public and alumni discontent, the school was renamed Augusta University in 2015. The arsenal commandant's house, one of the original four arsenal buildings, is now known as the Stephen Vincent Benét House. It was designated as a National Historic Landmark on November 11, 1971. Noted poet and novelist Stephen Vincent Benét lived here when his father, Colonel James Walker Benét commanded the Augusta Arsenal from 1911 to 1919. The house later served as the President's House of Augusta College.
