= Milton Free Public Library =

Coordinates: 43°30′0.2″N 70°57′52.3″W

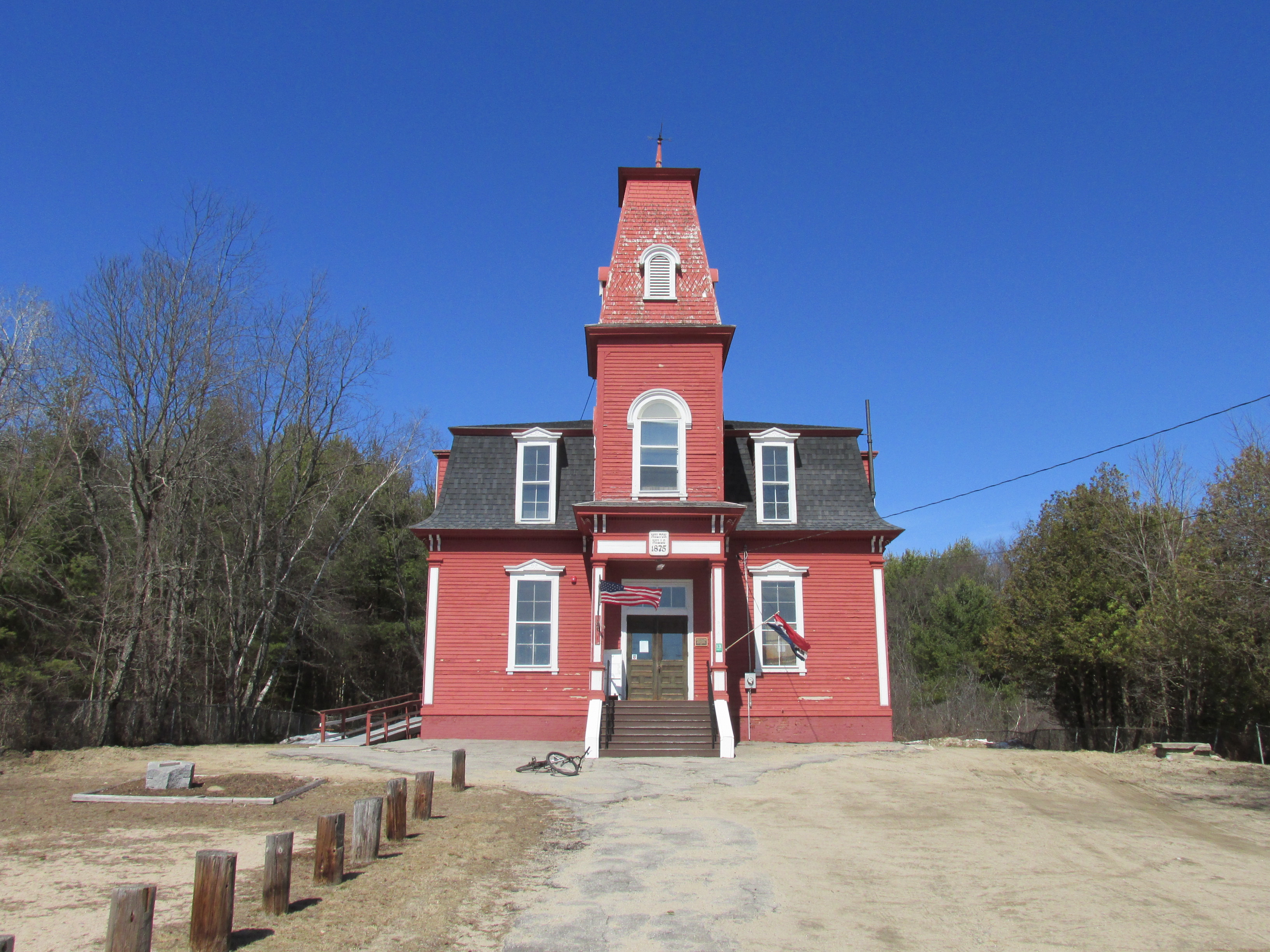
- Location: 13 Main Street; Milton Mills, New Hampshire, United States
- Type: Public
- Established: 1892

Other information
- Website: miltonfreepubliclibrary.org

The Milton Free Public Library is a public library located in Milton Mills, New Hampshire.

== Structure ==
The library has three stories and a tower. The basement and the tower are not in use, the first floor is where the books are held, and the second floor has been renovated into a children's room with plenty of activities for younger patrons.

== History ==
Before the library was built there were other buildings that housed books, but no official library for the town. The library was originally located on the first floor of the current Milton Historical Society on 56 Main Street. The library there was built in 1916 with money left over from the town budget that was purposed towards a library. Resources were donated by John E. Towsend. The very first librarian to work there was John Simes and the first trustees were John E. Horne, Everett Fox, and Moses G. Chamberlain. In 1992, the library was moved to its current location, 13 Main Street. Before the library was moved there, the location was a grammar school which opened in 1875. According to records, the land that the school was built on did not officially become part of the town until September 26, 1921.
