= Isaac M. St. John =

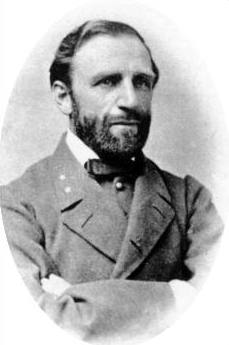
- Born: November 19, 1827; Augusta, Georgia
- Died: April 7, 1880 (aged 52); White Sulphur Springs, West Virginia
- Burial place: Hollywood Cemetery; Richmond, Virginia
- Military career
- Allegiance: Confederate States of America
- Branch: Confederate States Army
- Service years: 1861–1865
- Rank: Brigadier General
- Commands: Nitre and Mining Bureau; Commissary General of Subsistence of the CSA
- Conflicts: American Civil War
- Other work: Civil engineer

Isaac Munroe St. John (November 19, 1827 – April 7, 1880) was a Confederate States Army brigadier general during the American Civil War. He was a lawyer, newspaper editor and civil engineer before the Civil War and a civil engineer after the Civil War. As a civil engineer, he worked for the Baltimore and Ohio Railroad Company (mainly in Maryland) and the Blue Ridge Railroad Company in South Carolina before the Civil War. After the war, he worked for the Louisville, Cincinnati and Lexington Railroad in Kentucky; the city of Louisville, Kentucky; and the Chesapeake and Ohio Railway Company (mainly in Virginia and West Virginia).

== Early life ==
Isaac M. St. John was born on November 19, 1827, in Augusta, Georgia. He moved to New York, New York, with his parents, Isaac Richards St. John and Abigail Richardson Munroe St. John, and attended Poughkeepsie Collegiate School. He graduated from Yale University in 1845 and became a lawyer. In 1847, St. John became the editor of the Baltimore Patriot. He was a civil engineer with the Baltimore and Ohio Railroad Company between 1848 and 1855. He then moved to South Carolina where he became a civil engineer and chief of construction for the Blue Ridge Railroad Company between 1855 and 1861.

== American Civil War service ==
Isaac M. St. John began the Civil War as a private in the Fort Hill Guards of South Carolina in April 1861. By October 3, 1861, he was an engineer in the Army of the Peninsula. By April 1862, he was Brigadier General John B. Magruder's chief engineer at Yorktown, Virginia, in the Peninsula Campaign with the rank of captain. On April 18, 1862, St. John became the Chief of the Bureau of Nitre and Mining, an assignment which he held until February 16, 1865. In this position, he produced crucial ordnance supplies, including gunpowder and metals, for the Confederate Army, even as the Union blockade of Southern ports became increasingly effective. Among other things, he found limestone caves containing saltpeter in the southern Appalachian Mountains. He was appointed major, CSA artillery, September 26, 1862 and lieutenant colonel, CSA, Nitre and Mining Corps, May 28, 1863.

St. John resigned from the Nitre and Mining Bureau on January 31, 1864, because the Confederate Senate accused him of protecting draft dodgers. His resignation was refused and the charge was proven untrue. He was promoted to colonel on June 15, 1864.

On February 16, 1865, by special act of the Confederate Congress, St. John was promoted to brigadier general and was appointed commissary general of subsistence because of his procurement skills. He relieved some supply problems through direct acquisitions but his innovations came too late in the war to make a significant impact.

St. John was paroled at Thomasville, Georgia, about June 1, 1865, and was promptly pardoned on June 19, 1865, after having taken the oath of amnesty on June 18.

== Aftermath ==
After the war, St. John was chief engineer for the Louisville, Cincinnati and Lexington Railroad from 1866 to 1869. Then, he was city engineer for two years with city of Louisville, Kentucky. He became a civil engineer for the Chesapeake and Ohio Railway and ultimately the head of its Mining and Engineering Department.

Isaac Munroe St. John died April 7, 1880, at The Greenbrier at White Sulphur Springs, West Virginia. He is buried at Hollywood Cemetery, Richmond, Virginia.

== See also ==
- List of American Civil War Generals (Confederate)
