= Niter and Mining Corps =

Confederate military unit

The Niter and Mining Corps was a military unit within the Confederate States Army during the American Civil War. Their original task was to keep the Confederacy supplied with minerals and metals needed for the war effort, but as the conflict dragged on, they were at times assigned to field and combat duty.

Niter (saltpeter), a key ingredient in gunpowder and other explosives, was mined in caves in various places in the South. Early in the war, several officers began informally overseeing the mining operations. Niter was responsible for the manufacture of gunpowder, copper, lead, iron, coal, zinc, and other materials that might be required for the prosecution of the war. Those activities became more formalized after June 16, 1863, when the First Confederate Congress passed an act authorizing the creation of a formal Niter and Mining Bureau as an independent office within the Confederate War Department. Its first commander was Colonel Isaac M. St. John.

The Bureau opened new coalfields in North Carolina and Alabama and coordinated the flow of mineral fuel to Confederate naval stations along the coast. A corps of officers was established for this purpose. During the latter half of the war, the corps reported to Benjamin Huger. The unit saw combat during the Battle of Piedmont during the Valley Campaigns of 1864.
