= Lost Apple Project =

Nonprofit organization

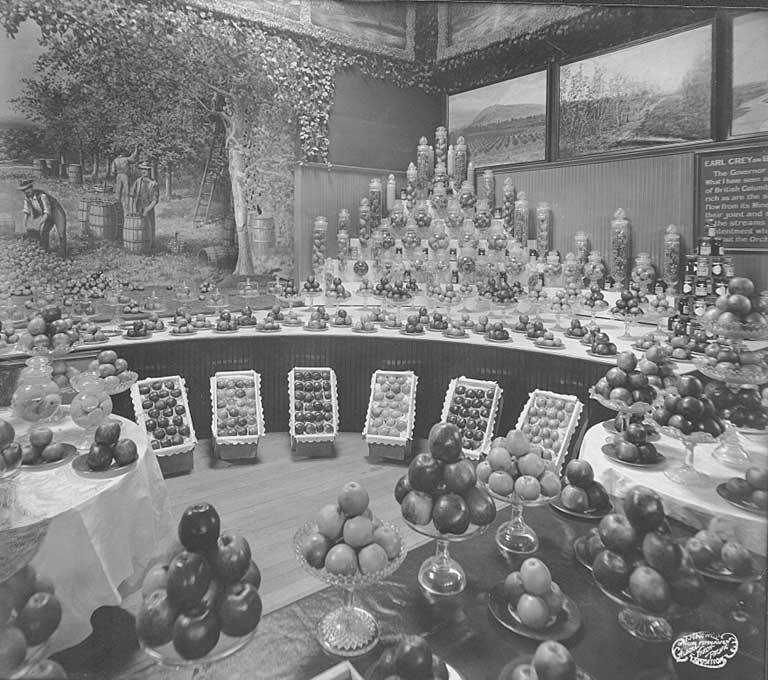
Apple varieties available at the Alaska–Yukon–Pacific Exposition in Seattle, Washington, 1909.

The Lost Apple Project is a nonprofit organization that searches abandoned farms and orchards in the Pacific Northwest to locate old apple varieties that have been thought to be lost or extinct. At one time, there were approximately 17,000 named varieties of domesticated apples in the United States, but only about 4,500 are known to exist today.

The project was founded by E.J. Brandt and David Benscoter, who work closely with the Temperate Orchard Conservancy in Oregon which identifies the specimens that Brandt and Benscoter collect. Brandt and Benscoter rely on old county fair records, newspaper clippings, and nursery sales ledgers, as well as tips from people, to find likely places to search for old trees. They collect apple specimens in the fall, then return in the winter to gather wood cuttings (scions) for grafting. The project's searches focus on eastern Washington, western Idaho, and northern Oregon. The project is affiliated with the Whitman County Historical Society.

As of May 2021, the project has discovered 29 lost apple varieties. Some of the lost apple varieties that the project has found in Washington and Idaho include the Streaked Pippin, the Sary Sinap, and the Nero. Nero, which was discovered at Steptoe Butte, was the first old apple variety found by Benscoter.

Benscoter and co-author Linda Hackbarth published Lost Apples: The Search for Rare and Heritage Apples in the Pacific Northwest in September 2024, documenting the project's story of locating lost apple varieties.
