= Confederate Survivors Association =

American Civil War veterans organization

The Confederate Survivors Association was a fraternal organization for American Civil War veterans of the Confederate States Army. It was based in Augusta, Georgia, and remained active well into the 20th Century.

The Confederate Survivors Association (CSA) was a benevolent, historical, and social association dedicated to preserving the comradeship of those who served all Confederate military and naval service functions. Membership was based upon service, accompanied by endorsements verifying that service. The group was formally organized on May 3, 1878, but originated in an older organization known as the Cavalry Survivors Association which had been established in August 1866 as one of the earliest Confederate veterans organizations. Capt. William B. Young was the president of the Cavalry Survivors Association for twelve years until it merged with the Confederate Survivors Association in 1878. Former Confederate general Goode Bryan presided over the first organizational meeting of the new CSA.

On June 2, 1879, the city of Augusta gave custody of the chimney of the city's Confederate Powderworks to the CSA to "beautify it and protect it from injury as a Confederate Memorial." The group restored the brick chimney and added a memorial plaque.

The CSA adopted the United Confederate Veterans' constitution in February 1894, but not without concern about losing individual identity. The Augusta Confederate Survivors Association became Camp No. 435 of the United Confederate Veterans; however, it retained its original name. In 1896, the Augusta CSA petitioned the UCV to change its name to Confederate Survivors Association so that the C. S. A. could be retained. At its peak, the CSA had over 900 members from throughout Georgia, although many were in the Augusta area. Another chapter had been founded in York County, South Carolina, in 1880. In 1894, seven years after former Brig. Gen. Roswell S. Ripley's burial in Magnolia Cemetery in Charleston, the local Confederate Survivors Association, erected a monument of him.

In December 1898, after the Spanish–American War, President William McKinley toured the South by train to celebrate the victory over Spain and to thank the citizens for their support of the war effort. During a whistle-stop in Macon, Georgia, the 400 members of the Bibb County CSA camp warmly greeted the President, and one veteran presented him with a Confederate badge. McKinley may have been the first U.S. president to wear such an emblem publicly.

Presidents, or commanders, of the association included Gen. Clement A. Evans (1878–79); Col. Charles Colcock Jones, Jr. (1879–July 1893); Capt. F. E. Eve (1894 – May 1897), Salem Dutcher (1897–1899), H. B. Smith (1889–1900), George W. McLaughlin (1900–?), George T. Lamback (1912), A. J. Twiggs (1921), and Gen. J. D. Fooshee (1936).

A collection of CSA records and artifacts is maintained in the Reese Library of Augusta State University.
