= Gustav Sohon =

Prussian-American painter (1825–1903)

Gustavus Sohon
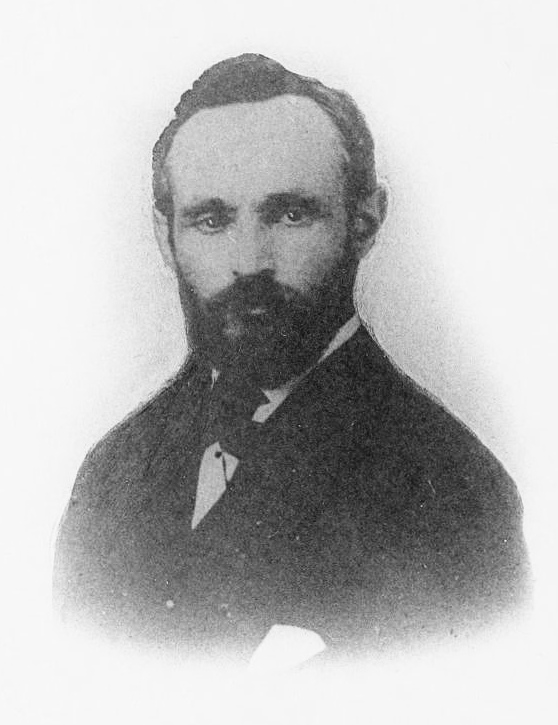
- Gustavus Sohon in 1863
- Born: 1825; East Prussia
- Died: September 9, 1903
- Spouse: Julianna Groh

Gustav Sohon (Note: Sohon's given name is also portrayed as Gustavus or Gustave.) (1825 – September 9, 1903) was an American artist, interpreter, and topographical assistant who documented military campaigns, treaty councils, and landscapes in the American West.

== Early life ==
Sohon was born in 1825 in Tilsit, East Prussia. He immigrated to the United States in 1842 at the age of 17.

== Career ==
In the early 1850s, he enlisted in the U.S. Army and spent his military career in the Pacific Northwest and the Rockies. In the military, he contributed to exploration efforts and worked as an artist, topographer, and interpreter. Sohon's depictions of military campaigns in the West provide rare insight into the landscapes encountered by the US military in the 19th century, as well as interactions with local Indigenous communities. Notably, he depicted the first panoramic view of the Rocky Mountains and the earliest-known sketch of the Great Falls of the Missouri. He also recorded several treaty councils during his time with Lieutenant John Mullan and Isaac Stevens for the Pacific Railroad Surveys railroad survey. However, the extent to which some of Sohon's depictions represent first-hand accounts remains unclear.

Fort Benton on the Upper Missouri, the eastern terminus of the Mullan Road, as depicted by Gustavus Sohon

Sohon's five-year enlistment ended in July 1857. He then sought out his earlier friend and mentor, Lieutenant John Mullan. Mullan was spearheading the construction of a military road from Walla Walla to Fort Benton, and Sohon surveyed routes and monitored the construction progress. Before 1860, wagon parties crossed the Rocky and Bitterroot Mountains to the Columbia Plateau via the Overland Trail; Sohon led the first wagon party by an alternate route. When Mullan's Road was complete, Sohon accompanied him to Washington, D.C., to assist in the preparation of topographical data, maps, and illustrations for a report on the road's construction. He never returned to the Northwest.

Walla Walla Council as depicted by Gustavus Sohon

== Personal life ==
In April 1863, Gustav Sohon and Julianna Groh were married. For a brief time they lived in San Francisco, where Sohon ran a photography studio. Several years later, they returned to Washington, D.C. Sohon disappeared from public life, running a shoe business and raising a large family with Julianna. He died on September 9, 1903.

== Sources ==
- Brewster, David; Buerge, David M. (1988). Washingtonians: A Biographical Portrait of the State. Seattle, Washington: Sasquatch Books. ISBN 9780912365169 – via Internet Archive.
- McDermott, Paul D.; Grim, Ronald E. (Summer 2002). Nicandri, David L. (ed.). "The Artistic Views of Gustavus Sohon" (PDF). Columbia: The Magazine of Northwest History. Vol. 16, no. 2. Washington State Historical Society. ISSN 0892-3094. Archived (PDF) from the original on 2025-07-05.
