= George Washington Rains =

American soldier and academic (1817–1898)

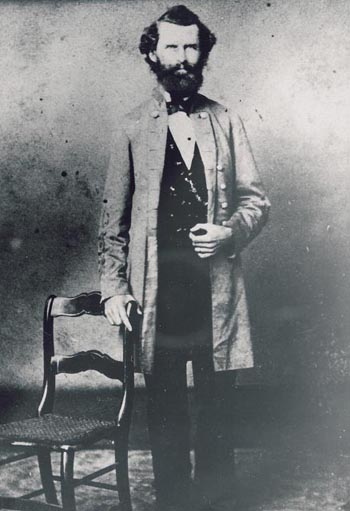
- George W. Rains during the Civil War
- Born: 1817; Craven County, North Carolina
- Died: March 21, 1898 (aged 80–81); Newburgh, New York
- Burial place: Saint George's Cemetery, Newburgh
- Relatives: Brig. Gen. Gabriel J. Rains (brother)
- Military career
- Allegiance: United States of America; Confederate States of America
- Branch: United States Army; Confederate States Army; Georgia Militia
- Service years: 1842–1856; 1861–1865
- Rank: Captain (USA); Colonel (CSA); Brigadier General (not confirmed)
- Nickname: Chief Chemist of the Confederacy
- Units: 4th U.S. Artillery; Bureau of Nitre and Mining
- Commands: Augusta Powderworks; 1st Regiment, Georgia Local Defense
- Conflicts: Mexican–American War; Siege of Vera Cruz (1847); Battle of Cerro Gordo (1847); Battle of Contreras (1847); Battle of Churubusco (1847); Battle of Molino del Rey (1847); Battle of Chapultepec (1847); American Civil War; Savannah Campaign (1864)
- Other work: College professor, author, inventor

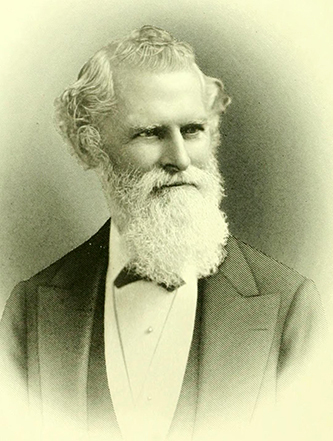
Rains in later years

George Washington Rains (1817 – March 21, 1898) was a United States Army and later Confederate States Army officer. A skilled engineer and inventor; he was instrumental in providing the Confederacy with much-needed gunpowder throughout the American Civil War. He also was the younger brother of fellow Confederate general Gabriel J. Rains.

== Life and career ==
Rains was born in Craven County, North Carolina in 1817. He graduated from the United States Military Academy at West Point in 1842, third out of a class of 56; he was then commissioned a 2nd Lieutenant in the Corps of Engineers. In the next year, he transferred to the 4th U.S. Artillery Regiment, and then became an assistant professor of chemistry, mineralogy, and geology back at West Point.

Rains participated in the Mexican–American War. He was the first American to enter Vera Cruz (to exchange prisoners on behalf of General Winfield Scott) and was assigned as a staff officer to Gideon Pillow's brigade. He fought at Vera Cruz, Cerro Gordo, Contreras, Churubusco, Molino del Rey and Chapultepec. During his time fighting in the war, he served under General Scott. For his services, he was promoted to 1st Lieutenant and brevetted Captain.

Over the next years he frequently changed stations and often served on recruiting duty. His permanent promotion to Captain came in February 1856 when he was stationed in New York, but he married that year into one of America's wealthiest families (the Ramsdells, of Newburgh, NY), resigned his commission that October, and moved to upstate New York.

Rains became a proprietor of the large Washington & Highland Iron Works in Newburgh, New York, where he gained extensive experience managing a factory, hiring employees, and organizing shipping and logisitics. He held patents for steam boilers. His wife, Frances Josephine Ramsell (1838–1919), gave him a daughter, Fanny Powell Rains, in 1858.

=== During the Civil War ===
When the American Civil War began, Rains joined the Confederate Army. He became a major in the Ordnance Department and was personally tasked by President Jefferson Davis in July 1861 with supplying the entire Confederacy with gunpowder by locating a location and building a centralized military-grade gunpowder mill. He built the Confederate Powderworks in Augusta, Georgia, while simultaneously developing Tennessee's ordnance network and supporting Gen. Albert S. Johnston's Western army.

Rains also helped expand and modernize at the Augusta Arsenal. At its peak the powder works regularly produced about 7,000 pounds (3,175 kg) a day, more than 2,750,000 pounds (1,247 tonnes) throughout the war, making it the second-largest gunpowder factory in the world at that time. Rains also directed the switch from holding gunpowder in barrels to holding it in boxes he specially designed for this purpose, with dimensions of 1 x 1 x 2.5 feet.

Rains was promoted to colonel on July 12, 1863. He raised and commanded the local defense regiment in Augusta during in 1863 and removed the key machinery from the mill during Sherman's March to the Sea. In one of the most curious military decisions of the war, Sherman bypassed Augusta, which was essentially defenseless.

Shortly before the war ended he received additional command of the ordnance depots and arsenals in the lower Confederacy. Apparently in 1865 he had been made a brigadier general in the Georgia Militia, though he also kept his Confederate rank.

Rsins' older brother, Gabriel J. Rains, was a West Point graduate of 1827 and served as Confederate brigadier general. The older Rains had specialized in the creation and use of mines, booby traps and torpedoes; and headed the Torpedo Bureau. Though not working together, the brothers were collectively known as the Bomb Brothers, while George Rains on his own had been called the Chief Chemist of the Confederacy.

=== After the war ===
After the war Rains stayed in Augusta and chose an academic life; he lectured as professor of chemistry at the Medical College of Georgia. Also becoming its dean, he retired in 1894 and returned to Newburgh. He died there on March 21, 1898, and was buried at Saint George's Cemetery.

== Selected works by George W. Rains ==
- Rains, George W. (1845). Practical observations on the generation of statical electricity by the electrical machine. New Haven: B.L. Hamlen.
- Rains, George W. (1861). Notes on making saltpetre from the earth of the caves. New Orleans: Daily Delta job office.
- Rains, George W. (1882). History of the Confederate powder works. Newburgh, NY: Newburgh daily news print.
- Savas (2026) The Indispensable Man: George Washington Rains, the Confederate Powder Works, and the Civil War You Never Knew Savas Beatie LLC
- Savas (2007) Never for Want of Powder: The Confederate Powder Works in Augusta, Georgia, with co-authors C. L. Bragg, Gordon A. Blaker, Charles D. Ross, and Stephanie A. T. Jacobe
- US Patent No. 28.011 (Re-issue No. 1016); Improved Feed-Water Apparatus for Steam Boilers; 1860
- US Patent No. 32.204; Improvement in Steam-Boilers; 1861
- US Patent No. 32.532; Improved Safety Apparatus for Steam Boilers; 1861

== See also ==
- List of American Civil War generals (Acting Confederate)
- Confederate Powderworks
- Bureau of Nitre and Mining
