= Voiland College of Engineering and Architecture =

Coordinates: 46.7299587°N 117.1689211°W

- Type: Public
- Established: 1917
- Parent institution: Washington State University
- Dean: Partha Pande (Interim)
- Location: Pullman, Washington, U.S.
- Website: vcea.wsu.edu

The Voiland College of Engineering and Architecture is one of eleven colleges at Washington State University.

== History ==
The Voiland College of Engineering and Architecture was established in 1917 as the College of Mechanical Arts and Engineering upon the reorganization of the State College of Washington, but its roots trace back to the original establishment of Washington State University in 1890 that included a mechanical engineering program. The college was renamed in 2014 in recognition of Gene Voiland, a 1969 alumnus of the college, and his wife Linda's ongoing contributions to the college and industries.

== Academic departments and programs ==
The college is structured into five departments:

- The Gene and Linda Voiland School of Chemical Engineering and Bioengineering
- Department of Civil and Environmental Engineering
- School of Design and Construction, with programs in architecture, interior design, landscape architecture, and construction management
- School of Electrical Engineering and Computer Science
- School of Mechanical and Materials Engineering
