= Gabriel J. Rains =

Confederate Army general

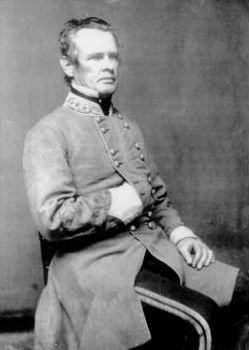
- Born: June 4, 1803; New Bern, North Carolina, US
- Died: August 6, 1881 (aged 78); Aiken, South Carolina, US
- Burial place: Saint Thaddeus Cemetery; Aiken, South Carolina
- Military career
- Allegiance: United States; Confederate States of America
- Branch: United States Army; Confederate States Army
- Service years: 1827–61 (USA); 1861–65 (CSA)
- Rank: Lieutenant Colonel (USA); Brigadier General (CSA)
- Nickname: The Bomb Brothers (with his brother George Washington Rains)
- Conflicts: Seminole Wars; Mexican War; Siege of Fort Texas; Battle of Resaca de la Palma; Mexico City Campaign; Yakima War; Battle of Union Gap; American Civil War; Battle of Wilson's Creek; Battle of Shiloh; Battle of Perryville; Battle of Seven Pines

Gabriel James Rains (June 4, 1803 – September 6, 1881) was a United States Army officer who resigned his commission and became a brigadier general in the Confederate States Army during the American Civil War.

== Early life ==
Gabriel James Rains was born in June 1803 in New Bern, North Carolina, to cabinetmaker Gabriel Manigault Rains and Ester Ambrose. His younger brother, George Washington Rains, was also a brigadier general in the Georgia Militia, and the two were known as "the Bomb Brothers" for their creation and use of land mines, torpedoes, booby traps, and other explosives. Rains graduated from the United States Military Academy at West Point, New York, in 1827, 13th in his class. Among his classmates were Leonidas Polk, Napoleon Bonaparte Buford, and Philip St. George Cooke.

== Military career ==
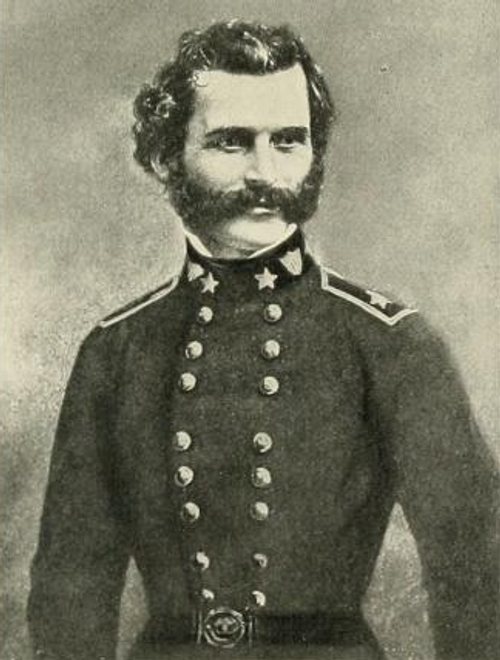
Early photo in US Army uniform

Upon graduation, Rains was commissioned as a second lieutenant in the infantry. Rains served in the Seminole Wars and was promoted to captain on December 25, 1837, and brevetted major on April 28, 1840, for his service against the Seminoles near Fort King, Florida, where he routed a superior force, and was twice severely wounded. One of his wounds was considered mortal, and several obituary notices of him were published, however he survived the wounds. Rains took part in the Mexican War and was engaged in the defense of Fort Brown in May 1846. When General Pedro de Ampudia demanded the surrender of the fort, Rains cast the deciding vote against surrender in a council of officers.

Following the Battle of Resaca de la Palma he was ordered to the United States on recruiting duty, and organized a large part of the recruits for General Winfield Scott's campaign. Rains was promoted to major of regulars on March 9, 1851, and from 1853 until the Civil War he served on the Pacific Coast, where he took part in the Indian Wars. In 1855 he was brevetted to brigadier general of Washington Territory volunteers. Rains was the commanding officer of Fort Humboldt from 1856 through 1860. He was promoted to lieutenant colonel of regulars on June 5, 1860, but resigned his commission on July 31, 1861, and joined the Confederate States Army, in which he was commissioned a brigadier general and got command of a brigade in the Richmond area.

== Civil War ==
Rains was wounded during the Battle of Seven Pines, and was singled out by Maj. Gen. Daniel Harvey Hill for a successful flanking maneuver that turned the tide of battle in favor of the Confederates. Rains, who turned 59 a few days after the battle, was one of the oldest officers in the Confederate army, and it was decided to reassign him to a less physically demanding job. After recovering from his wounds, he was then placed in command of the conscription and torpedo bureaus at Richmond. He organized the system of torpedoes and mines that protected the harbors of Charleston, Savannah, Mobile and other port cities, and invented an early land mine that was successfully used in battle.

=== Land mines ===
The development of the first modern mechanically fused high explosive anti-personnel land mines was attributed to Rains during the Battle of Yorktown in 1862. (As a captain, Rains had earlier employed explosive booby traps during the Seminole Wars in Florida in 1840.) Both mechanically and electrically fused "land torpedoes" were employed, although by the end of the war, mechanical fuses had been found to be generally more reliable. Many of these designs were improvised in the field, especially from explosive shells, but by the end of the Civil War, nearly 2,000 standard pattern "Rains mines" had been deployed.

== Post-war and death ==
Following the end of the war, Rains worked as a chemist in Augusta, Georgia, but later moved to Charleston, South Carolina, where he worked as a civilian clerk in the US Army Quartermaster Department. He died in Aiken, South Carolina, on August 6, 1881, and was buried in St. Thaddeus Cemetery.

== See also ==
- List of American Civil War generals (Confederate)
