= Confederate Powderworks =

American Civil War gunpowder factory

Coordinates: 33.4869°N 81.9924°W

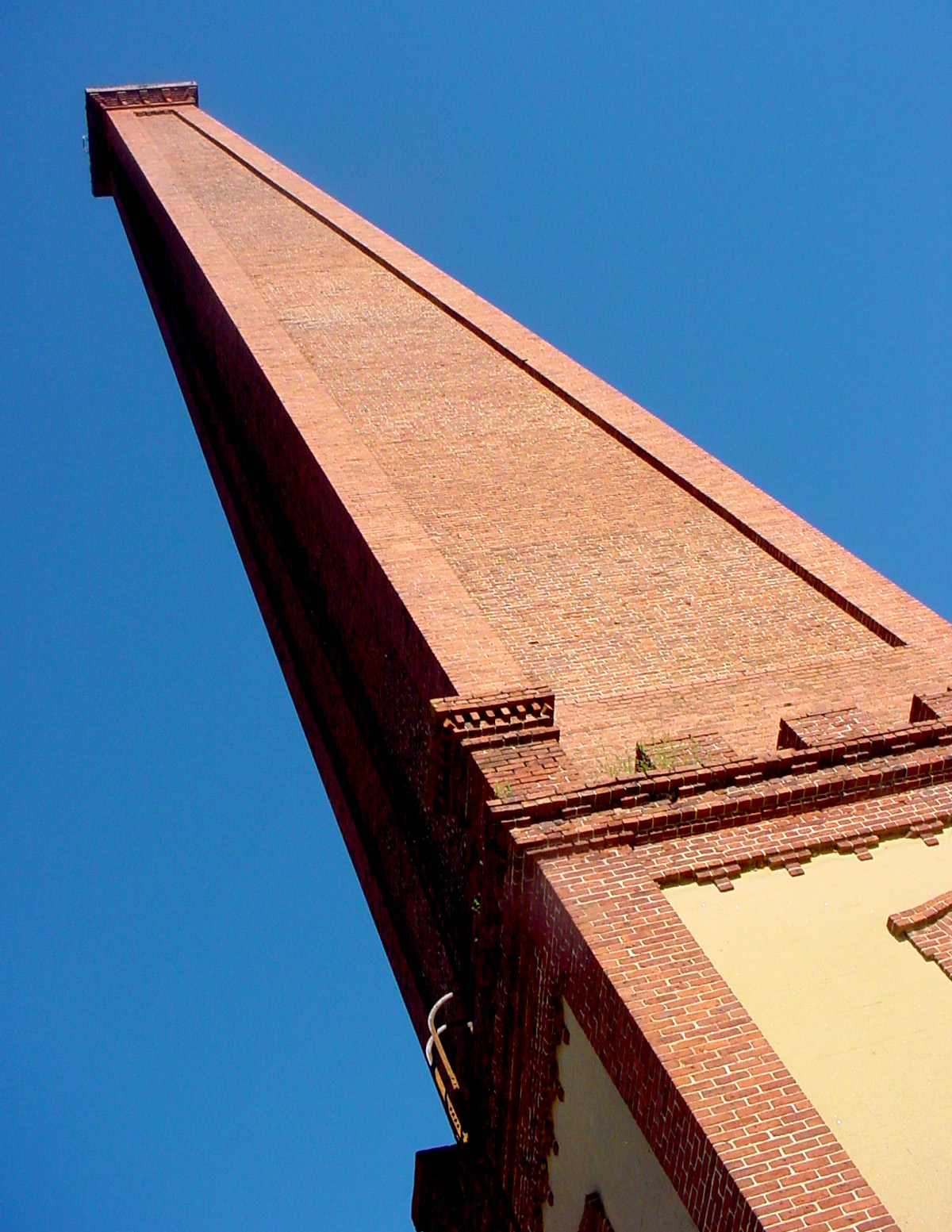
The obelisk chimney on the grounds of Sibley Mill is the only remaining structure from the original Confederate Powderworks.

The Confederate Powderworks, also known as the Augusta Powder Works, was a gunpowder factory during the American Civil War. It is one of the only permanent structures completed by the Confederate States of America that was not destroyed by Union forces. Colonel George Washington Rains chose the old United States Arsenal site between the Augusta Canal and Savannah River in Augusta, Georgia, as a secure inland location with good rail and water connections. The Powderworks produced almost 3 million pounds (1.4 million kilograms) of gunpowder during the war.

== History ==
George Washington Rains graduated from West Point with the class of 1842 and served as a chemistry teacher for the Military Academy before serving with gallantry in the Mexican War. He had resigned in 1856 after marrying into the wealthy Ramsdell family to become president of an ironworks in Newburgh, New York, owned by his father-in-law. At the start of the Civil War he chose allegiance to his native North Carolina and returned to the South. Jefferson Davis, the president of the Confederacy assigned Rains to develop a national gunpowder manufacturing facility and gave him carte blanche to do so.

Construction of the powder works began in September 1861; a 130 hp steam engine was purchased from an Atlanta flour mill owned by Richard Peters and the powder works was producing gunpowder in just 7 months in 1862. Rains was guided by a pamphlet written by a British artillery officer describing the powder works at Waltham Abbey in Essex County near London, and also found someone who had worked there to advise him.

As was customary for gunpowder mills, the buildings were separated and designed to survive explosions, with raw materials starting at one end, and the finished powder ending a mile and a half away at the other end. The saltpeter refinery building was the largest, was designed in Gothic style as a replica of the British Houses of Parliament.

The Confederate Powderworks was the second largest gunpowder factory in the world at that time, producing 3.5 tons per day. More than 2.75 million pounds (1.25 million kilograms) of first-quality gunpowder (a majority of the powder used by the Confederacy) were produced before its closure in 1865. By comparison, Union gunpowder manufacture was distributed among many mills, with the larger Hazard Powder Company of Connecticut producing 40% of the annual production of 8.4 million pounds (3.8 million kilograms).

A pamphlet describing the Confederate Powder Works in Augusta, Georgia. From the "Georgia History" series. May, 1945

== Remains ==
Although the massive works were seized and dismantled after the war ended, Rains asked in 1872 that the obelisk chimney be spared as he had designed it to "remain a monument to the Confederacy should the Powderworks pass away". On June 2, 1879, Augusta gave custody of the chimney to the Confederate Survivors Association to "beautify it and protect it from injury as a Confederate Memorial". The association repaired the square castellated base, protected the corners and in the face, looking towards the canal inserted a large tablet of Italian marble, bearing this inscription: "This Obelisk Chimney — sole remnant of the extensive Powder Works here erected under the auspices of the Confederate Government — is by the Confederate Survivors' Association of Augusta, with the consent of the City Council, conserved in Honor of a fallen Nation, and inscribed to the memory of those who died in the Southern Armies during the War Between the States".

The 150-foot (46 m) tall chimney still stands on the Augusta Canal and is one of the more recognizable features of the Augusta skyline today, located at the Sibley Mill at 1717 Goodrich Street. The Sibley cotton mill was built on the site as a private venture in 1880–82, using bricks from the demolished powder works, and became one of the largest and most successful cotton mills in the region. It manufactured denim until 2006, and the mill's water-driven turbines still generate electricity which is sold to Georgia Power.

The chimney is the only remaining portion of the original powder works. The B/G E. Porter Alexander Camp #158, Sons of Confederate Veterans, spent eight years raising $192,000 to restore the chimney with its historical marker; work started on November 19, 2009, and was completed on March 12, 2010. A rededication ceremony was held on October 9, 2010.
