= Washington State Historical Society =

Historical society in Washington, US

- Abbreviation: WSHS
- Formation: 1891
- Type: 501(c)(3) Nonprofit, Trustee Agency of the State
- Headquarters: Tacoma, Washington, U.S.
- Location: Tacoma, U.S.
- Region served: State of Washington
- Main organ: Washington State History Museum (owns and operates)
- Publication: Columbia: The Magazine of Northwest History

The Washington State Historical Society is the historical society of the U.S. state of Washington. Based in Tacoma, it is a 501(c)(3) nonprofit and is a trustee agency of the state. It was founded in 1891.

The board of trustees of the society includes the Governor of Washington, Secretary of State of Washington, and Washington Superintendent of Public Instruction, and four members of the Washington State Legislature.

The society owns and operates the Washington State History Museum. The society's official journal is Columbia: The Magazine of Northwest History. In 2016, the publication received a Leadership in History Award of Merit from the American Association for State and Local History.

== See also ==
- List of historical societies in Washington (state)
