= Historical society =

Organization that preserves items of historical interest

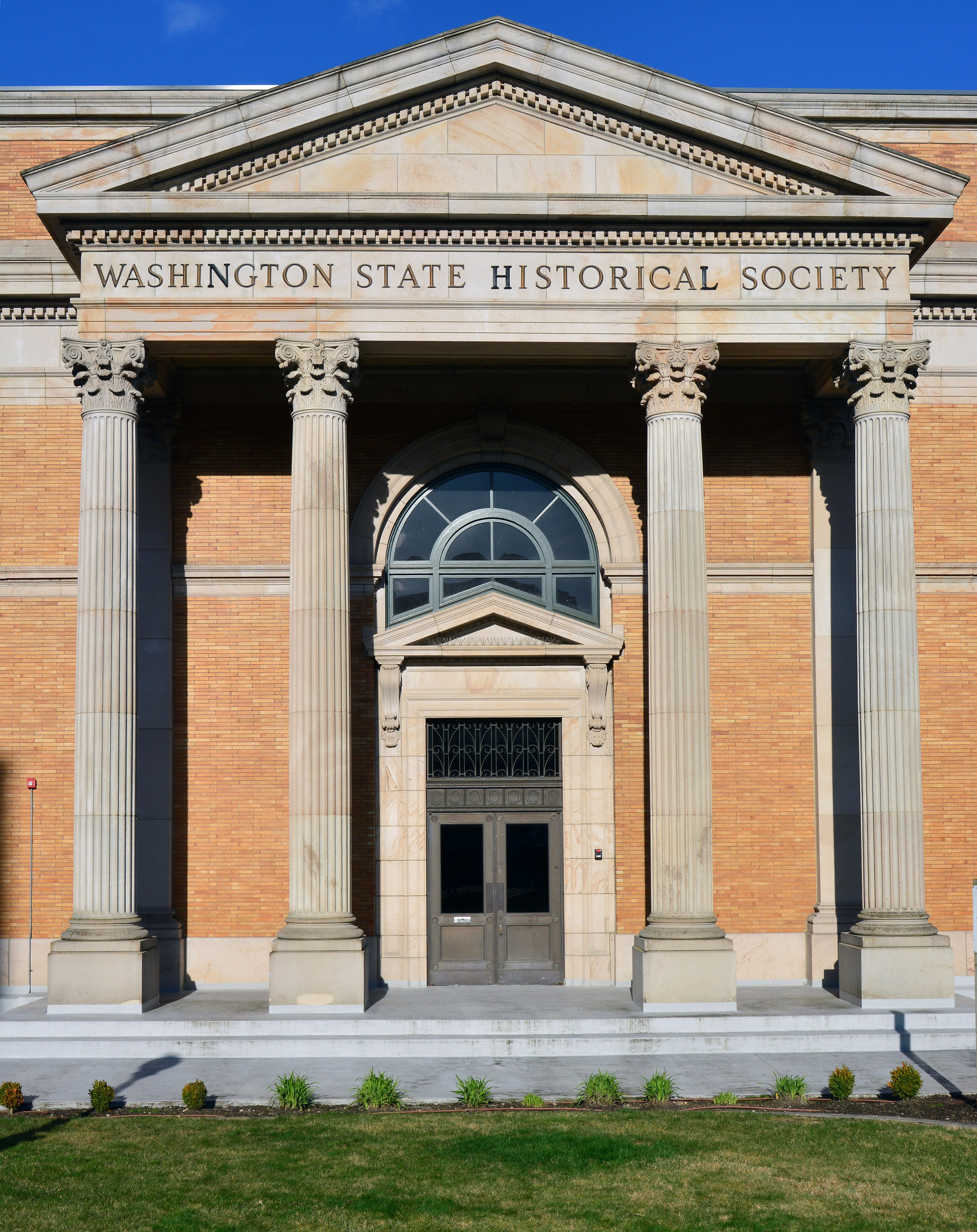
The Washington State History Research Center, operated by the Washington State Historical Society

A historical society is non-profit organization dedicated to collecting, preserving, interpreting, and promoting the history of a particular place, group of people, or topic. They play a crucial role in promoting historical awareness and understanding by providing a platform for research, education, and public engagement.

Historical societies vary in specialization, with focuses ranging from specific geographical areas such as countries, states/provinces or cities/towns, ethnographic such as ethnic and genealogical, and topical such as transportation, event based, or military history.

== Functions ==
=== Collecting and archiving ===
Historical societies acquire and maintain historical materials like documents, photographs, artifacts, and audio recordings. These collections serve as a vital resource for researchers, genealogists, and the general public.

=== Research and education ===
Many historical societies have staff historians who conduct research on their collections and broader historical topics. They publish books, articles, and educational materials to share their findings with the public.

=== Public programs and exhibits ===
Historical societies organize lectures, workshops, tours, and exhibitions to engage the community and educate them about history. These programs can range from introductory talks for general audiences to specialized conferences for academic researchers.

=== Community outreach ===
Historical societies often collaborate with local schools, libraries, and community centers to offer educational programs and promote historical literacy.

== History ==
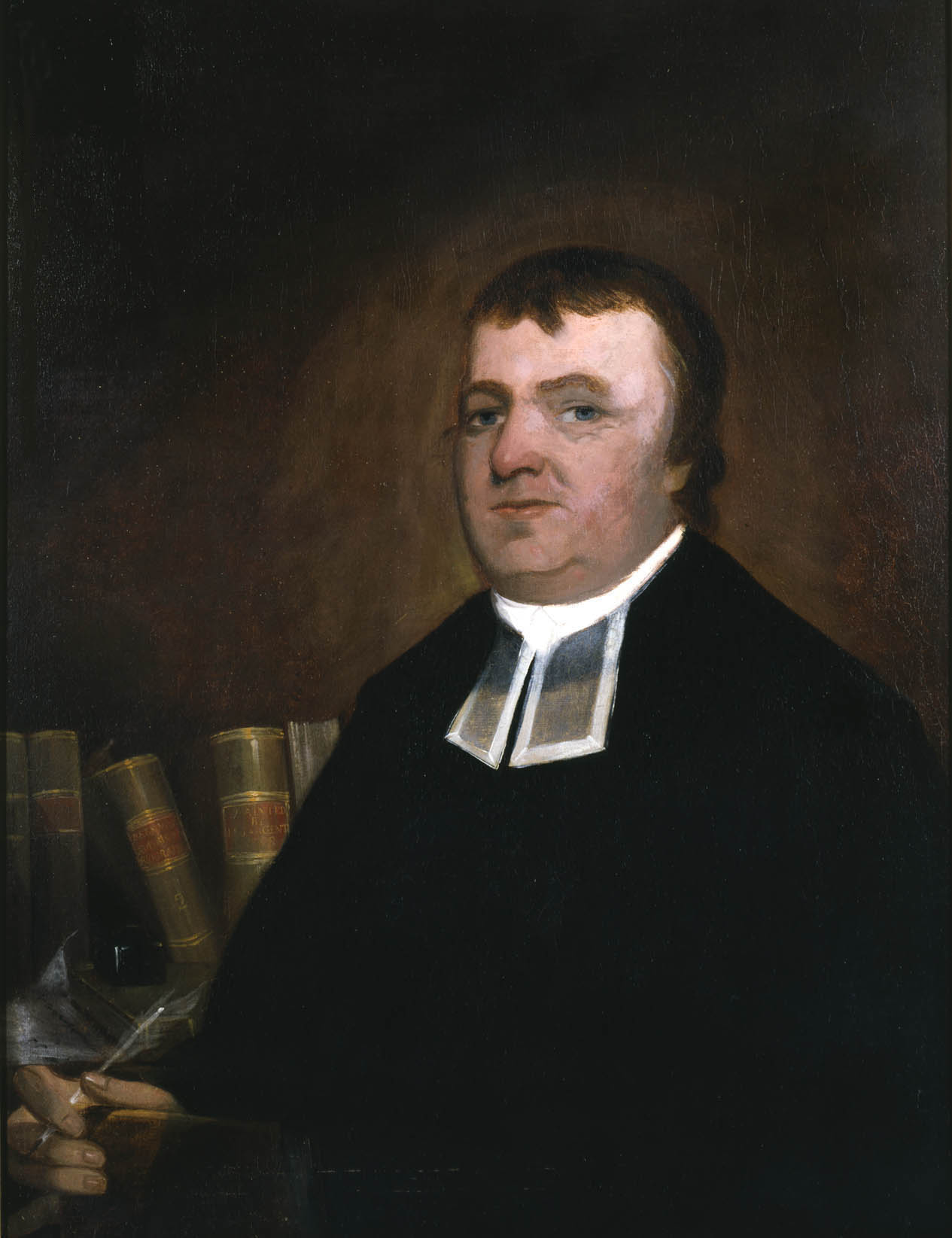
Rev. Jeremy Belknap

The concept of a historical society itself has evolved over time. Early institutions have concentrated on material culture (like the Academy) while later ones embraced broader historical research methods.

The inception of historical societies can be traced back to Western Europe during the 16th and 17th centuries, where they were often founded by enthusiasts of antiquity. These societies experienced a significant surge in growth in the first half of the 19th century, coinciding with a renewed interest in history alongside the rise of bourgeois-nationalistic ideals, the strengthening of national identities, and advancements in scientific historical research methods. Throughout the 19th and 20th centuries, historical societies have played a pivotal role on a large scale, disseminating a wealth of historical source materials, producing their own publications, and organizing congresses.

The title of the first formally established historical society in the United States goes to the Massachusetts Historical Society (MHS), founded in 1791. While there were earlier informal groups with similar aims, the MHS stands out for its official structure and dedication to preserving American history.

The MHS owes its creation to Reverend Jeremy Belknap, a passionate antiquarian and minister. Concerned about the loss of historical materials, Belknap gathered a group of like-minded Bostonians, including scholars, politicians, and civic leaders. Together, they envisioned an organization dedicated to collecting, preserving, and studying the history of Massachusetts and, by extension, the broader American story.

Historical societies evolved in the 19th century with more inclusive membership policies, transitioning in the Progressive Era to serve the public. Interest in local history surged in the 20th century, especially in preserving changing cities. The founding of the American Association for State and Local History in 1940 further emphasized this shift. Over time, historical societies diversified their focus to include marginalized groups, reflecting changes in the discipline of history and societal developments towards greater inclusivity.

== Funding ==
External support and contributions have long been integral to the sustainability of historical societies. Donations, memberships, annual funds, corporate sponsorships, internships, volunteering, and utilizing historic spaces all play vital roles in the ongoing growth and preservation of these nonprofit organizations.

== Governance ==
Historical societies in the United States diversity in their governance structures. This reflects their varied missions, sizes, and funding sources.

=== Non-profit board structure ===
This is the most prevalent structure. A volunteer board of directors, composed of community leaders, history enthusiasts, and sometimes professional expertise, oversees the society's operations. The board sets strategic direction, hires an executive director, and approves budgets.

The benefits of this model provides diverse perspectives, fosters community engagement, and leverages volunteer expertise. Its challenges are that board members might require training on non-profit governance and historical best practices. Ensuring continuity of vision with board member turnover can be difficult.

=== Government-affiliated ===
State Historical Societies: Some states have government-established historical societies that receive partial funding from the state legislature. These societies often have a board with a mix of appointed and elected members, balancing public accountability with expert guidance.

Municipal or County Historical Societies: These societies might receive funding from local governments while maintaining a degree of autonomy. Their boards might include a mix of appointed officials and community representatives. The benefits of this model are access to government funding can support larger projects and professional staffing but require a balancing of public policy that mandates with the society's mission creating a potential for political influence on historical interpretation.

=== Hybrid models ===
Collaboration with Universities: Some historical societies engage in partnerships with universities, tapping into academic knowledge and potentially utilizing shared resources or personnel. Governance arrangements may include a combined board or advisory committees. Benefits of a hybrid model can leverage the strengths of different institutions and fosters collaboration across cultural sectors but navigating the complexities of inter-institutional decision make for potential conflicts of interest.

Factors Affecting Governance are the size and budget of an organization can impact the structure of its board, with larger societies with paid staff often requiring a more formalized approach compared to smaller volunteer-run groups. The sources of funding play a crucial role in shaping the composition and responsibilities of the governing body, especially for organizations reliant on government support. The mission and focus of a society also influence its governance, with boards of societies dedicated to specific historical themes often benefitting from members with relevant expertise in the field.

New York takes a unique approach to cultural agencies, viewing them not as nonprofit businesses but as educational organizations. These cultural agencies play a vital role in the educational system, operating under Education Law instead of Corporation Law and falling under the jurisdiction of the Board of Regents of the University of the State of New York.

== Global comparison ==
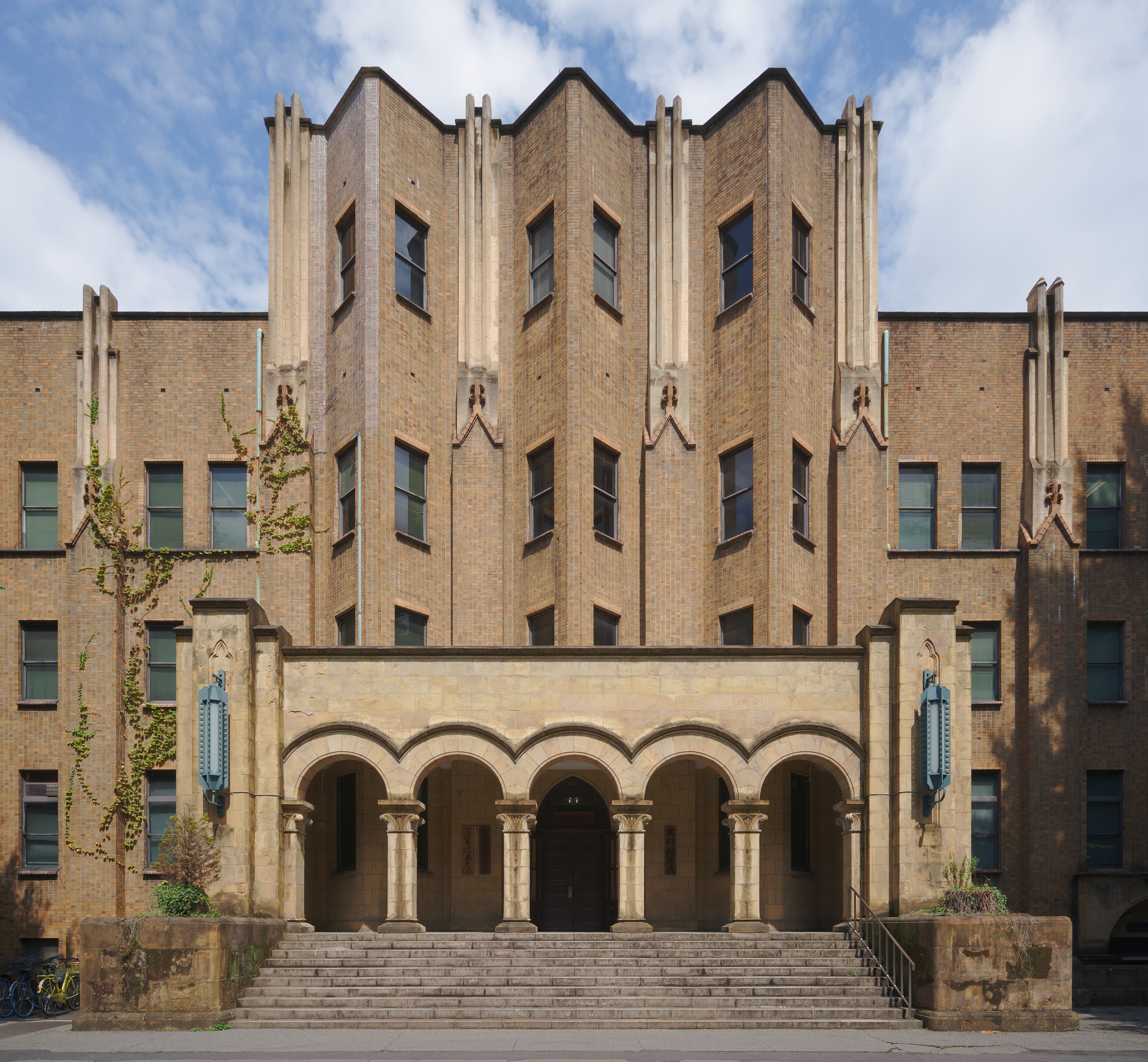
The entrance of the building of the Historiographical Institute of the University of Tokyo.

American historical societies emphasize local and state history, often decentralized with strong volunteer bases. They hold extensive collections of documents and artifacts, focusing on oral histories to capture diverse community experiences. Despite funding and staffing challenges, their grassroots initiatives prioritize underrepresented stories.

European historical societies, rooted in royal patronage, often feature centralized structures with a focus on academic research, public engagement, and significant collections spanning archaeology, classical studies, and colonial-era documents. Despite grappling with their colonial past, these societies benefit from established infrastructure and funding for extensive research and global collaborations.

Asian historical societies in countries like China, Japan, and India have diverse focuses, from specific dynasties to cultural traditions. With vast collections of ancient texts and artifacts, these societies bridge traditional knowledge systems with Western research methods, promoting cultural exchange and a deeper global understanding of Asia's rich history.

== See also ==
- List of historical societies
