= List of former state routes in Georgia (200–699) =

- Standard state highway markers
- State: Georgia State Route XX (SR XX)

System links
- Georgia State Highway System; Interstate; US; State; Special

This is a list of former state routes in the U.S. state of Georgia. This list represents routes that traveled through the state but are no longer in operation, have been decommissioned, or have been renumbered.

== State Route 204 Spur ==
State Route 204 Spur
- Location: Savannah
- Length: 7.2 mi (11.6 km)
- Existed: 1989–2020

State Route 204 Spur (SR 204 Spur) was a spur route of SR 204 that connected the mainline to Skidaway Island. Segments of SR 204 Spur are named Montgomery Cross Road, Waters Avenue, Whitfield Avenue, Diamond Causeway, and Tidewater Way. SR 204 Spur was turned over to local control in February 2020 as part of the deal with the Georgia Department of Transportation that extended SR 17 onto the Jimmy DeLoach Parkway and truncated the eastern terminus of SR 204 to SR 21.

== State Route 205 ==
State Route 205
- Bells Ferry Road
- Location: Cherokee County
- Existed: 1948–1985

State Route 205 (SR 205) was a state highway that existed in the north-central part of the state. It was assigned to Bells Ferry Road in Cherokee County. Between 1946 and the end of 1948, it was established between SR 92 at a point southwest of Canton and SR 5 in the city. By the middle of 1955, all of the highway except for the southern terminus was hard surfaced. The portion at the southern terminus had completed grading, but was not surfaced. About two years later, this southern part was paved. In 1970, SR 92's segment between Acworth and Woodstock was shifted southward, and SR 205 was extended southward on SR 92's old alignment to SR 92's new path. In 1985, it was decommissioned.

Browse numbered routes
← SR 204	GA	→ SR 206

== State Route 207 ==
State Route 207
- Hog Mountain Road
- Location: Oconee County
- Length: 2.1 mi (3.4 km)
- Existed: 1942–1983

State Route 207 (SR 207) was a 2.1-mile-long (3.4 km) state highway that existed in the central part of the state, completely within Oconee County. It is now known as Hog Mountain Road. In 1942, SR 207 was established from SR 53 west-northwest of Watkinsville to US 129/SR 15/SR 24 north-northeast of the city. Its entire length was indicated to be "on system–not marked or maintained". The next year, the entire highway had a "completed hard surface". In 1983, it was decommissioned.

Major intersections

The entire route was in Oconee County.

Location	mi	km	Destinations	Notes
	0.0	0.0	SR 53 / Hog Mountain Road south / Mars Hill Road – Watkinsville, Bogart, Winder	Southern terminus; the "Hog Mountain Road" designation continued onto SR 53.
	2.1	3.4	US 129 / US 441 – Athens, Watkinsville	Northen terminus
1.000 mi = 1.609 km; 1.000 km = 0.621 mi: Route transition

Browse numbered routes
← SR 206	GA	→ SR 208

== State Route 209 ==
State Route 209
- Location: Crows–Bogart
- Length: 1.9 mi (3.1 km)
- Existed: 1942–1983

State Route 209 (SR 209) was a state highway in the Athens area. It existed entirely within Oconee County. In 1942, it was established from US 78/SR 10 in Crows, to US 29/SR 8 in Bogart, and then northeast to the Oconee–Clarke county line. This northern terminus was just south-southeast of the Oconee–Clarke–Barrow–Jackson county quadripoint. The entire length of the highway was indicated to be "on system–not marked or maintained". The next year, the southern half of the highway had a "completed hard surface". By the end of 1946, the southern terminus was shifted to another intersection with US 78/SR 10, but at a point south-southeast of Bogart. The entire length of this new part was hard surfaced. The northern terminus was truncated to the US 29/SR 8 intersection in Bogart. In 1983, SR 209 was decommissioned.

Major intersections

The entire route was in Oconee County.

Location	mi	km	Destinations	Notes
Crows	0.0	0.0	US 78 / SR 10 (Monroe Highway) – Athens, Monroe, Watkinsville	Southern terminus; the "Mars Hill Road" designation continued past SR 209's southern terminus.
Bogart	1.9	3.1	US 29 / SR 8 (Atlanta Highway)	Northen terminus
1.000 mi = 1.609 km; 1.000 km = 0.621 mi: Route transition

Browse numbered routes
← SR 208	GA	→ SR 210

== State Route 210 ==
State Route 210
- Location: Lookout Mountain
- Existed: 1941–1977

State Route 210 (SR 210) was a very short state highway that was located in Lookout Mountain. At the end of 1941, it was established from SR 157 and SR 193 just west of the city limits of Lookout Mountain and then east and northeast to the Tennessee state line, at the Chattanooga city limits. The next year, the entire length of the highway had a "completed hard surface". Between 1955 and the middle of 1957, it was shifted to a different alignment. It traveled from SR 157 northwest to the Tennessee state line, at the Lookout Mountain city limits. This new alignment was paved. Between 1963 and 1966, the northern terminus was shifted slightly to the east. The highway then traveled on a south-southwest to north-northeast direction. In 1977, SR 210 was redesignated as part of SR 189.

Browse numbered routes
← SR 209	GA	→ SR 211

== State Route 213 ==
State Route 213
- Location: Eatonton–South of Covington
- Existed: 1941–1982

State Route 213 (SR 213) was a state highway that existed in the central part of the U.S. state of Georgia. It traversed through parts of Putnam, Morgan, Jasper, Newton, and Walton counties. Its southern terminus was at SR 16 in central Putnam County, while its northern terminus was at SR 36 south of Covington. It was a major route through the Oconee National Forest. Major settlements along former the route include Eatonton, Godfrey, Newborn, and Mansfield.

=== State Route 213 Spur ===
State Route 213 Spur
- Newton Road
- Location: Pennington
- Length: 0.408 mi (657 m)
- Existed: 1963–1982

State Route 213 Spur (SR 213 Spur) was a spur route of SR 213 that existed entirely in Pennington, which is southwest of Madison, in Morgan County. It was locally known as Newton Road.

History

Between 1960 and the end of 1963, SR 213 Spur was established in Pennington from SR 213 to SR 83. In 1982, it was decommissioned.

== State Route 214 ==
State Route 214
- Location: Macon County
- Existed: 1942–1982

State Route 214 (SR 214) was a state highway that existed in the central part of the state. It was entirely within Macon County. In 1942, it was established from SR 26 east-southeast of Fountainville to another intersection with SR 26 in Oglethorpe. The next year, its entire length had a "completed hard surface". The highway remained virtually unchanged for the next 40 years. In 1982, SR 214 was decommissioned.

=== State Route 214 Bypass ===
State Route 214 Bypass
- Location: Oglethorpe
- Existed: 1965–1982

State Route 214 Bypass (SR 214 Byp.) was a bypass route of SR 214 just west of Oglethorpe. Between 1963 and 1966, it was established from SR 26/SR 49 southwest of the city to SR 214/SR 214 Spur northwest of it. In 1982, SR 214 Byp. was decommissioned and redesignated as the southern part of SR 128 Byp.

=== State Route 214 Spur ===
State Route 214 Spur
- Location: Oglethorpe
- Existed: 1965–1982

State Route 214 Spur (SR 214 Spur) was a spur route of SR 214 that existed mostly within the city limits of Oglethorpe. Between 1963 and 1966, SR 214 Spur was established from SR 214/SR 214 Byp. northwest of Oglethorpe to SR 90/SR 128 in the city. In 1982, SR 214 Spur was decommissioned.

== State Route 217 ==
State Route 217
- Miona Springs Road
- Location: Macon County
- Length: 3.5 mi (5.6 km)
- Existed: 1942–1969

State Route 217 (SR 217) was a state highway that existed entirely within Macon County. In 1942, it was established from SR 128 north of Oglethorpe to SR 127 south-southeast of Reynolds. Between 1963 and 1966, the entire length of the highway had a "topsoil or gravel" surface. In 1969, SR 217 was decommissioned.

Major intersections

The entire route was in Macon County.

Location	mi	km	Destinations	Notes
	0.0	0.0	SR 128 – Oglethorpe, Reynolds	Southern terminus
	3.5	5.6	SR 127 to SR 128 west – Reynolds, Marshallville	Northern terminus
1.000 mi = 1.609 km; 1.000 km = 0.621 mi

Browse numbered routes
← SR 216	GA	→ SR 218

== State Route 218 ==
State Route 218
- Location: Walker and Catoosa counties
- Existed: 1942–1985

State Route 218 (SR 218) was a short state highway that existed in Walker and Catoosa counties. It is currently known as Lakeview Drive. In 1942, it was established from US 27/SR 1 in Lakeview to SR 146 southeast of that city. Between November 1946 and February 1948, the entire highway was hard surfaced. In 1985, SR 218 was decommissioned.

Browse numbered routes
← SR 217	GA	→ SR 219

== State Route 221 ==
State Route 221
- Jackson Lake Load
- Location: Jasper County
- Length: 10.4 mi (16.7 km)
- Existed: 1939–1983

State Route 221 (SR 221) was a state highway that existed in the west-central part of Jasper County. It was locally known as Jackson Lake Load. In 1943, it was established from SR 16 west of Monticello to SR 11 in Prospect. A decade later, the entire highway had completed grading, but was not surfaced. Between 1957 and the end of 1960, the entire length was paved. The highway remained virtually unchanged for the next two decades. In 1983, it was decommissioned.

== State Route 222 ==
State Route 222
- Jesse Cole Road
- Location: Meriwether County
- Existed: 1943–1986

State Route 222 (SR 222) was a short state highway that existed entirely within the southeastern part of Meriwether County. Today, it is known as Jesse Cole Road. In 1943, it was established from SR 85 east-northeast of Manchester to SR 173 north of that city. Its entire length had completed grading, but was not surfaced. By the end of 1948, its entire length had a "sand clay, top soil, or stabilized earth" surface. Between 1955 and the middle of 1957, SR 85 was redesignated as SR 85E. By the end of 1960, the entire length of SR 222 was paved. In 1986, this highway was decommissioned.

Browse numbered routes
← SR 221	GA	→ SR 223

== State Route 226 ==
State Route 226
- Location: Dawson and Hall counties
- Existed: 1943–1980

State Route 226 (SR 226) was a state highway that existed in the north-central part of the state. It traversed parts of Dawson and Hall counties. In 1943, it was established from SR 53 to SR 9E at two different points northwest of Gainesville. By the end of 1946, its entire length was hard surfaced. Between 1957 and the end of 1960, the southern terminus was truncated to the Hall–Dawson county line. Between 1963 and 1966, it was further truncated to a point just west of the county line. In 1968, yet another truncation left the southern terminus at the northern shore of Lake Lanier. In 1980, SR 226 was decommissioned.

Browse numbered routes
← SR 225	GA	→ SR 227

== State Route 229 ==
State Route 229
- Location: Monticello–Social Circle
- Length: 34.6 mi (55.7 km)
- Existed: 1943–1982

State Route 229 (SR 229) was a state highway in the central part of the state. It traversed parts of Walton, Newton, and Jasper counties. The roadway that would eventually become SR 229 was an unnumbered road built between 1921 and the end of 1926 between SR 11 in Social Circle to SR 12 southeast of the city. Its entire length had a "sand clay or top soil" surface. In 1930, this road was designated as SR 60. In 1937, part of SR 142 was established on a path from Farrar to Newborn. At the end of 1940, SR 60 was redesignated as SR 181. The segment of SR 142 was under construction. At the end of 1941, SR 181 was redesignated as SR 213. The next year, the SR 142 segment had completed grading, but was not surfaced. In 1943, SR 213 was designated on a southern alignment, which may have included a portion from Mansfield east-northeast to SR 142 in Newborn and then north-northwest to SR 12 east of Covington. However, these segments were not indicated on maps. The SR 142 segment had a sand clay or top soil surface. SR 229 was designated from SR 11 in Monticello to SR 142 north-northwest of Farrar. The southern part of this segment had a "completed hard surface"; its northern part had a sand clay or top soil surface. By the end of 1946, the northern segment of SR 213 was redesignated as part of SR 229. It was also designated on a segment from Newborn to east of Covington; however, there was no indication if the three segments were connected by concurrencies with other highways or not. The northern portion of the segment from Monticello to north-northwest of Farrar had completed grading, but was not surfaced. By the end of 1948, the SR 142 segment was hard surfaced. SR 229's segment from Newborn to east of Covington had a sand clay, top soil, or stabilized earth surface. By the end of 1951, the northern segment of SR 229 was hard surfaced. The portion from Monticello to north-northwest of Farrar was also hard surfaced. Between 1957 and the end of 1960, the portion from Newborn to east of Covington was paved. In 1982, SR 229 was decommissioned.

Major intersections

This table represents SR 229's junctions in 1970.

County	Location	mi	km	Destinations	Notes
Jasper	Monticello	0.0	0.0	SR 11 – Monticello, Covington, Atlanta	Southern terminus
Jasper		12.3	19.8	SR 142 east – Farrar, Eatonton	South end of SR 142 concurrency
Jasper	Morrow	14.8	23.8	SR 213 south – Pennington, Madison	South end of SR 213 concurrency
Newton	Newborn	17.6	28.3	SR 142 west / SR 213 north – Shady Dale, Eatonton	North end of SR 142 and SR 213 concurrencies
Newton		25.3	40.7	US 278 west / SR 12 west – Shady Dale, Eatonton	South end of US 278 and SR 12 concurrencies
Newton				I-20 (SR 402)	I-20 exit 101
Walton		30.5	49.1	US 278 east / SR 12 east – Rutledge	North end of US 278 and SR 12 concurrencies
Walton	Social Circle	34.6	55.7	SR 11 (Cherokee Road) / Hightower Trail north	Northern terminus
1.000 mi = 1.609 km; 1.000 km = 0.621 mi: Concurrency terminus

Browse numbered routes
← SR 228	GA	→ SR 230

== State Route 235 ==
State Route 235
- Location: Fulton County
- Length: 2.2 mi (3.5 km)
- Existed: 1944–1963

State Route 235 (SR 235) was a 2.2-mile-long (3.5 km) loop road from SR 9 in what is now the Buckhead neighborhood of Atlanta. Heading south, it pulled off of SR 9 (Roswell Road) onto Habersham Road NW, turning left onto Chatham Road NW, following it to Andrews Drive NW, turning right onto Andrews Drive NW and following it until rejoining SR 9 (Peachtree Road). The road first appeared in 1944, and was deleted between 1961 and 1963, when it was converted to a local road.

Browse numbered routes
← SR 234	GA	→ SR 236

== State Route 238 ==
State Route 238
- Location: Troup County
- Existed: 1946–1975

State Route 238 (SR 238) was a short state highway that existed in the west-central part of the state. It was entirely within Troup County. Between 1945 and the end of 1946, it was established from the Alabama state line west-southwest of LaGrange to US 29/SR 14 southwest of Lees Crossing. By the end of 1948, the entire highway, except for the westernmost portion had a "sand clay, top soil, or stabilized earth" surface. The next year, the western terminus also had that same type of surface. By the middle of 1950, all of the highway was hard surfaced. In 1975, SR 238 was decommissioned due to the West Point Dam beginning service and flooding portions of the route. The route formerly known as SR 238 is now separated into three parts, known as Glass Bridge Road east of West Point Lake, Abbottsford Road in the center of the lake, and an extension of Chambers County Road 222 from the Alabama state line to Rocky Point Recreation Area.

Browse numbered routes
← SR 237	GA	→ SR 239

== State Route 239 ==
State Route 239
- Location: Walker and Chattooga counties
- Existed: 1946–1976

State Route 239 (SR 239) was a state highway that existed in the northwestern part of the state. It traversed the northwestern part of Walker County and the southwestern part of Chattooga County. Between 1945 and the end of 1946, it was established from SR 48 in Cloudland to SR 157 southeast of Rising Fawn. Its entire length was hard surfaced. Almost exactly 30 years later, the southern portion of SR 157 was shifted southeastward, replacing all of SR 239.

Browse numbered routes
← SR 238	GA	→ SR 240

== State Route 243 ==
State Route 243
- Location: Wilkinson and Baldwin counties
- Length: 21.2 mi (34.1 km)
- Existed: 1946–2019

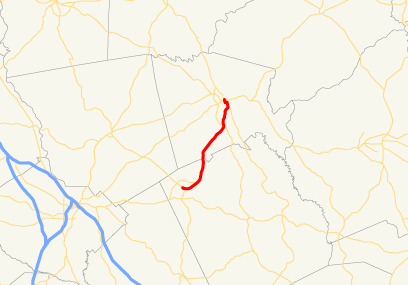
Map of SR 243 highlited in red

State Route 243 (SR 243) was a 21.2-mile-long (34.1 km) state highway that existed on a path from southwest of Gordon to Milledgeville. It traversed portions of northwestern Wilkinson and south-central Baldwin counties. The southernmost 13.4 miles (21.6 km) was part of the Fall Line Freeway, a highway that connects Columbus and Augusta. The former portion of SR 243 that was concurrent with U.S. Route 441 Business (US 441 Bus.) was redesignated as SR 29 Bus. The portion from southwest of Gordon to north-northeast of Ivey, as well as the later roadway that was built from that point to southeast of Milledgeville became concurrent with SR 540, the state highway designation for the Fall Line Freeway, and was replaced in 2019 by an extended SR 540.

History

SR 243 was established in 1946 along an alignment from Gordon to Scottsboro. By 1952, the section from the southern terminus to about Ivey and a section just southwest of Scottsboro were paved. In 1953, the entire route from Gordon to Scottsboro was paved.. Between 2013 and 2015, a new road was built from SR 243 north-northeast of Ivey to US 441/SR 29 south-southeast of Scottsboro. The segment between the Scottsboro and Sandersville areas was completed and opened to traffic in October 2016. In 2016, the new portion of highway was extended to SR 24 southeast of Milledgeville, and SR 243 was shifted onto it. The entire portion that had been concurrent with US 441 Bus. in Milledgeville was redesignated as SR 29 Bus. Between the beginning of 2017 and the beginning of 2019, SR 243 was decommissioned, with its final routing being entirely replaced by SR 540.

Route description

Former SR 243 began at an intersection with SR 57/SR 540 (Fall Line Freeway/Maddox Road) southwest of Gordon, in Wilkinson County. At this intersection, it began a concurrency with SR 540 as part of the Fall Line Freeway. The two highways traveled to the north-northeast. After a curve to the northeast, they crossed over Little Commissioner Creek and some railroad tracks of Norfolk Southern Railway. Here, they briefly entered the far western part of Gordon. After leaving the city limits of Gordon, they intersected SR 18 (Gray Highway). They curved to the east-southeast and re-entered Gordon. They left the city limits again. After a curve to the north-northeast, they briefly re-entered the city for a final time. After curving to the north-northeast, they crossed over Lake Tchukolaho on the McCook Bridge. They traveled through the town of Ivey, where they crossed over Beaver Creek and skirted past Brooks Lake. They curved to the northeast to an intersection where SR 540 split off to the northeast and SR 243 turned left to the north-northwest. After the highway separated from the Fall Line Freeway, it had a more northerly routing. Almost immediately, SR 243 entered Baldwin County and crossed a Central of Georgia Railway line. The highway curved to the northeast until it reached the unincorporated community of Scottsboro. There, it had an intersection with US 441/SR 29. After the intersection, SR 243 was concurrent with US 441 Business for the rest of its length. The highway headed north through Hardwick, and entered Milledgeville. It crossed over Fishing Creek on the Mayor Harry G. Bone Bridge. US 441 Business/SR 243 traveled north into downtown Milledgeville, along South Wayne Street. They turned left on West Franklin Street, passed Memory Hill Cemetery, and then turned right on South Clark Street before intersecting SR 49 (West Hancock Street). Just after this intersection, the two highways traveled along the southwestern edge of Georgia College, and intersected SR 22/SR 24 (West Montgomery Street). Here, SR 243 met its northern terminus, while US 441 Business continued north.

The only sections of former SR 243 that were part of the National Highway System, a system of routes determined to be the most important for the nation's economy, mobility and defense, were the section that traveled along the Fall Line Freeway and the section that was concurrent with US 441 Business.

Major intersections

This table shows the final routing of the highway.

County	Location	mi	km	Destinations	Notes
Wilkinson		0.0	0.0	SR 57 west / Fall Line Freeway – Jeffersonville, Gray, Macon	Western terminus; western end of Fall Line Freeway concurrency
Wilkinson		2.7	4.3	SR 18 (Gray Highway) – Gray, Gordon, Jeffersonville	
Wilkinson	Gordon			Milledgeville Road west – Gordon	Former SR 243 west
Wilkinson		9.4	15.1	Pennington Road north	Former SR 243 east
Baldwin	No major junctions				
Wilkinson	No major junctions				
Wilkinson–Baldwin county line		14.7	23.7	US 441 / SR 29 – Irwinton, Milledgeville	Interchange
Baldwin		16.9	27.2	SR 112 – Toomsboro, Milledgeville	Northern terminus of SR 112
Baldwin		23.2	37.3	SR 24 / SR 540 – Milledgeville, Sandersville	Eastern terminus
1.000 mi = 1.609 km; 1.000 km = 0.621 mi: Concurrency terminus

Browse numbered routes
← SR 242	GA	→ SR 244

== State Route 244 ==
State Route 244
- Location: Troup County
- Existed: 1948–1975

State Route 244 (SR 244) was a short state highway that existed in the west-central part of the state. It was completely within Troup County. Between 1946 and the end of 1948, it was established from the Alabama state line west-northwest of LaGrange to SR 109. Its entire length was hard surfaced. In 1975, it was decommissioned.

Browse numbered routes
← SR 243	GA	→ SR 245

== State Route 245 ==
State Route 245
- Location: Mineral Bluff–McCaysville
- Existed: 1948–1977

State Route 245 (SR 245) was a state highway in Fannin County. Between 1946 and 1948, SR 245 was designated from Mineral Bluff to McCaysville. Each terminus had a completed hard surface; the central part had a sand clay, top soil, or stabilized earth surface. The next year, the entire length of SR 245 was hard surfaced. In 1977, SR 60's path from northwest of Morganton to the North Carolina state line was shifted westward, replacing all of SR 245. Its former path from Mineral Bluff to the state line was redesignated as SR 60 Spur.

== State Route 248 ==
State Route 248
- Hamburg State Park Road
- Location: Washington and Hancock counties
- Length: 12.7 mi (20.4 km)
- Existed: 1949–1982

State Route 248 (SR 248) was a state highway that existed in the east-central part of the state. It traversed the north-central portion of Washington County and the east-central portion of Hancock County. It was locally known as Hamburg State Park Road. Between 1948 and the end of 1949, it was established from SR 102 north-northeast of Warthen to SR 16 in Jewell. The southern half of the highway had a "sand clay, top soil, or stabilized earth" surface. In 1953, this portion had completed grading, but was not surfaced. The Hancock County portion was hard surfaced. Between 1955 and the middle of 1957, the entire highway was paved. In 1982, it was decommissioned.

Browse numbered routes
← SR 247	GA	→ SR 249

== State Route 249 ==
State Route 249
- Location: Murrayville–Dahlonega
- Existed: 1949–1957

State Route 249 (SR 249) was a short-lived state highway. Between 1946 and 1948, an unnumbered road was built from Murrayville to Dahlonega; it had a "sand clay, top soil, or stabilized earth" surface. The next year, the unnumbered road between Murrayville and Dahlonega was designated as SR 249. By the middle of 1950, all of SR 249 was hard surfaced. By 1957, SR 60 was extended south-southwest on US 19/SR 9 into Dahlonega, then south-southeast to Gainesville, replacing all of SR 249.

Browse numbered routes
← SR 248	GA	→ SR 250

== State Route 250 ==
State Route 250
- Location: North of Glennville–Daisy
- Existed: 1957–1985

State Route 250 (SR 250) was a state highway that existed in Tattnall and Evans counties. The roadway that would eventually become SR 250 was established between 1945 and the end of 1946 as an eastern segment of SR 64 from US 25/SR 73 south of Claxton to US 280/SR 30 east-southeast of Daisy. This segment was indicated to be "projected mileage". By the end of 1948, the southern terminus of this segment was completed grading, but was not surfaced. By the end of 1949, SR 250 was established on a slightly different alignment. It began at an intersection with US 25/US 301/SR 73 south of Claxton, at a point farther south than the eastern segment of SR 64 did. Its eastern terminus was at SR 129 south-southeast of Claxton, in the northwestern part of Camp Stewart. By the end of 1951, the portion of SR 64 on either side of the SR 250 intersection had a "sand clay, topsoil, or stabilized earth" surface. In 1953, the entire Tattnall County portion of SR 64 had completed grading, but was not surfaced. The northern terminus of it was shifted westward to end in Daisy. By the middle of 1957, SR 250 was shifted northwest, replacing the entire length of the eastern segment of SR 64. By the end of 1963, the entire length of SR 250 was paved. In 1985, SR 250 was decommissioned.

== State Route 258 ==
State Route 258
- Location: Troup County
- Existed: 1949–1965

State Route 258 (SR 258) was a state highway that existed in the west-central part of the state. It was entirely within Troup County. Between February 1948 and April 1949, it was established from US 27/SR 1 west-northwest of Hogansville to US 29/SR 14 in that city. In 1953, the entire length of the highway was hard surfaced. Between June 1963 and the end of 1966, it was redesignated as a southern extension of SR 54.

== State Route 259 ==
State Route 259
- Location: Tarboro–Atkinson
- Existed: 1949–1980

State Route 259 (SR 259) was a state highway in the southeastern part of the state. It traversed the northwestern part of Camden County and the southeastern part of Brantley County. Between February 1948 and April 1949, it was established from SR 252 in Tarboro to US 84/SR 50 in Atkinson. The Camden portion of the highway had a "sand clay, top soil, or stabilized earth" surface. Between 1963 and the end of 1966, the entire length had a "topsoil or gravel" surface. In 1968, the northern half of the Brantley County portion was hard surfaced. In 1978, the rest of the highway was hard surfaced. At the beginning of 1980, SR 259 was decommissioned.

Browse numbered routes
← SR 258	GA	→ SR 260

== State Route 261 ==
State Route 261
- Location: Long County
- Existed: 1949–1981

State Route 261 (SR 261) was a state highway that existed in the eastern part of the state. It was entirely within Long County. Between February 1948 and April 1949, it was established from the Altamaha River on the Wayne–Long county line to US 25/US 301/SR 23 south of Glennville. By August 1950, it was extended northeast to an intersection with SR 196 at a point south-southeast of Glennville. By the end of 1951, the southern terminus of the highway was shifted northwest to be just north-northwest of the Wayne–Long–Tattnall county tripoint. In 1952, the southern terminus of SR 261 was reverted to its former location. The northern half of the highway had completed grading, but was not surfaced. Between 1957 and the end of 1960, the southern terminus was truncated slightly to the northeast. Between 1963 and the end of 1965, the southern terminus was once again reverted to its former location. At this time, the entire highway had a "topsoil or gravel" surface. In 1967, the northern half was hard surfaced. In 1981, SR 261 was decommissioned.

Browse numbered routes
← SR 260	GA	→ SR 262

== State Route 263 ==
State Route 263
- Location: Taylor County
- Existed: 1949–1987

State Route 263 (SR 263) was a state highway that existed in the central part of the state. It was entirely within Taylor County. Between February 1948 and April 1949, it was established from SR 128 north of Reynolds to US 19/SR 3 south-southwest of Salem. In 1953, the southern half of the highway was hard surfaced. By the middle of 1955, the northern half had a "sand clay, topsoil, or stabilized earth" surface. By mid-1957, this segment was paved. In 1987, SR 263 was decommissioned.

Browse numbered routes
← SR 262	GA	→ SR 264

== State Route 265 ==
State Route 265
- Location: Telfair County
- Existed: 1949–1976

State Route 265 (SR 265) was a very short state highway that existed in the south-central part of the state. It was entirely within Telfair County. Between February 1948 and April 1949, it was established from SR 117 east-northeast of Jacksonville to SR 149 northeast of that town. Between September 1953 and June 1954, the entire highway was hard surfaced. In 1976, the portion of SR 149 south of the SR 265 intersection was shifted northeastward, replacing all of SR 265.

Browse numbered routes
← SR 264	GA	→ SR 266

== State Route 267 ==
State Route 267
- Location: Marion and Talbot counties
- Existed: 1950–1997

State Route 267 (SR 267) was a short state highway that existed in the west-central part of the state. Between April 1949 and August 1950, it was established from SR 41 south of Geneva to US 80/SR 22 west-southwest of it. The entire length of the highway had a "sand clay, top soil, or stabilized earth" surface. In 1953, the northern terminus was shifted slightly to the west-southwest. Between July 1957 and June 1960, the entire length was paved. By the middle of 1963, the northern half of the highway was redesignated as part of SR 355. In 1997, SR 267 was decommissioned.

Browse numbered routes
← SR 266	GA	→ SR 268

== State Route 269 ==
State Route 269
- Location: Taliaferro County
- Existed: 1950–1983

State Route 269 (SR 269) was a short state highway that existed in the east-central part of the state. The highway was completely within Taliaferro County; however, the southern part traveled on the Warren–Taliaferro county line. Between April 1949 and August 1950, the highway was established from SR 12 southeast of Crawfordville to SR 47 in Sharon. Its entire length had a "sand clay, top soil, or stabilized earth" surface. By the end of 1951, the entire highway was hard surfaced. In 1983, SR 269 was decommissioned.

Browse numbered routes
← SR 268	GA	→ US 270

== State Route 276 ==
State Route 276
- Location: Long County
- Existed: 1950–1981

State Route 276 (SR 276) was a short state highway that existed in the eastern part of the state. It was entirely within Long County. Between April 1949 and August 1950, it was established from a point west-northwest of Ludowici to US 25/US 301/SR 23 northwest of the city. Between 1963 and 1966, the southern terminus was shifted slightly westward. At this time, the entire length of the highway had a "topsoil or gravel" surface. In 1981, SR 276 was decommissioned.

Browse numbered routes
← SR 275	GA	→ SR 277

== State Route 277 ==
State Route 277
- Location: Laurens County
- Existed: 1950–1960

State Route 277 (SR 277) was a short-lived state highway that existed in the central part of the state. It was completely within Laurens County. Between April 1949 and August 1950, it was established from the Dodge–Laurens–Bleckley county tripoint to US 80/SR 19/SR 26 in Dublin. The entire Dexter–Dublin segment was hard surfaced. Between September 1953 and June 1954, the southern terminus of the highway was truncated to just west of Dexter. By the middle of 1955, the southern terminus was reverted to just south-southeast of its former location. By mid-1957, the southern terminus was shifted to its original location. By the middle of 1960, SR 277 was redesignated as an eastern extension of SR 257.

Browse numbered routes
← SR 276	GA	→ US 278

== State Route 287 ==
State Route 287
- Location: Taylor County
- Length: 3 mi (4.8 km)
- Existed: 1950–1987

State Route 287 (SR 287) was a short north–south state highway that existed in the central part of the state. It was completely within Taylor County. Between April 1949 and August 1950, SR 287 was established from a point just south of the Macon–Taylor county line southeast of Reynolds to SR 96 east of that city. In 1952, the southern terminus was truncated to the county line. The next year, the entire highway was hard surfaced. By the middle of 1954, the southern terminus was truncated slightly. By the middle of 1955, the southern terminus was reverted to the county line. Near the end of the decade, the southern terminus was truncated again to the point that it was in 1954. Between 1963 and 1966, the southern terminus was reverted once again to the county line. In 1987, SR 287 was decommissioned.

Browse numbered routes
← SR 286	GA	→ SR 288

== State Route 289 ==
State Route 289
- Location: Appling and Jeff Davis counties
- Length: 9 mi (14 km)
- Existed: 1951–1980

State Route 289 (SR 289) was a state highway that existed in the southeastern part of the state. It traveled along the Appling–Jeff Davis county line. Between 1950 and 1952, it was established from US 23/SR 15 south-southwest of Graham to US 341/SR 27 in the city. In 1953, the central portion of the highway was shifted eastward to a more direct path between its termini. The portion of the highway north of the Big Satilla River had completed grading, but was not surfaced. Between 1960 and the middle of 1963, the portion south of the river was given the same treatment. In 1970, the portion north of the river was hard surfaced. Between 1978 and March 1980, SR 289 was decommissioned.

Browse numbered routes
← SR 288	GA	→ SR 290

== State Route 290 ==
State Route 290
- Location: Quitman County
- Length: 2 mi (3.2 km)
- Existed: 1951–1981

State Route 290 (SR 290) was a short north–south state highway that existed in the southwestern part of the state. It was entirely within Quitman County. Between 1950 and 1952, it was established as an S-shaped highway from Hatcher to US 82/SR 50 west-southwest of Springvale. In 1952, the southern terminus was shifted westward. This put the highway on a nearly due north–south direction. Between September 1953 and June 1954, the entire length of the highway was hard surfaced. In 1981, SR 290 was decommissioned.

Browse numbered routes
← SR 289	GA	→ SR 291

== State Route 291 ==
State Route 291
- Location: Quitman County
- Length: 2 mi (3.2 km)
- Existed: 1951–1981

State Route 291 (SR 291) was a short state highway that existed in the southwestern part of the state. It was located completely within Quitman County. Between August 1950 and the end of 1951, it was established as an S-shaped highway from Morris to US 82/SR 50 nearly due wet of Springvale. In 1952, the southern terminus was shifted slightly. This put the highway on a nearly due southwest–northeast direction. The next year, the southern terminus was shifted slightly to the northwest. By the middle of 1954, the southern terminus was extended slightly to the west. The entire length of the highway was hard surfaced. Between 1963 and 1966, the alignment of the highway was shifted to become a J-shaped highway. In 1981, SR 291 was decommissioned.

Browse numbered routes
← SR 290	GA	→ SR 292

== State Route 294 ==
State Route 294
- Location: Bartow County
- Existed: 1957–1965

State Route 294 (SR 294) was a short state highway that existed in the northwestern part of the state. It traveled completely within Bartow County. The roadway that would eventually become SR 294 was established in 1952 as SR 294N from Allatoona Dam east of Cartersville to SR 20 northeast of the city. The next year, the entire length of SR 294N was hard surfaced. Between June 1955 and July 1957, it was redesignated as SR 294. Between 1963 and 1966, it was again redesignated as SR 294N. This roadway would eventually become SR 20 Spur.

== State Route 294N ==
State Route 294N
- Location: Bartow County
- Existed: 1952–1957

State Route 294N
- Location: Bartow County
- Existed: 1965–1994

State Route 294N (SR 294N) was a short state highway that existed in the northwestern part of the state. It traveled completely within Bartow County. It was established in 1952 from Allatoona Dam east of Cartersville to SR 20 northeast of the city. The next year, all of SR 294N was hard surfaced. Between June 1955 and July 1957, the highway was redesignated as SR 294. Between 1963 and 1966, SR 294 was again redesignated as SR 294N. In 1994, SR 294N was redesignated as SR 20 Spur.

== State Route 294S ==
State Route 294S
- Location: Emerson
- Existed: 1952–1977

State Route 294S (SR 294S) was a short state highway that existed in the northwestern part of the state. It traveled completely within Bartow County. Nearly the entire highway was within the city limits of Emerson. In 1952, it was established from US 41/SR 3 in Emerson to just west of Red Top Mountain State Park in the far northeastern part of the city. The next year, the entire highway was hard surfaced. By the middle of 1955, US 41/SR 3 in the area was shifted eastward; the western terminus of SR 294S was then at SR 293. In 1977, SR 294S was decommissioned.

Browse numbered routes
← SR 294N	GA	→ SR 295

== State Route 300 (1959–1982) ==
State Route 300
- Location: Monticello–Rock Eagle Lake
- Length: 20.3 mi (32.7 km)
- Existed: 1960–1982

State Route 300 (SR 300) was a state highway that existed in the central part of the state. It followed a route between SR 83 northeast of Monticello and US 129/US 441/SR 24, near the Rock Eagle State 4-H Club Center north of Eatonton. The current SR 300 bears no relation to this highway. It was established in 1960. Later that year, a small portion at the eastern terminus was paved. By 1967, the section from its western terminus to the intersection with SR 142 was paved. In 1970, the entire length of the highway was paved. By 1983, the highway was decommissioned and given to local authority. SR 300 was reused as a renumbering of part of SR 257 and all of SR 333. Note that SR 333 would be reused on an unrelated route in 1993.

Major intersections

County	Location	mi	km	Destinations	Notes
Jasper		0.0	0.0	SR 83 (Madison Street) – Monticello, Forsyth, Madison	Western terminus
Putnam	Oconee National Forest	10.5	16.9	SR 142 (Shady Dale Road NW) – Willard, Shady Dale	
Putnam	Oconee National Forest	13.6	21.9	SR 213 north (Godfrey Road) – Godfrey	Western end of SR 213 concurrency
Putnam	Oconee National Forest	13.8	22.2	SR 213 north (Godfrey Road) – Eatonton	Eastern end of SR 213 concurrency
Putnam	Oconee National Forest	20.3	32.7	US 441 (US 129 / SR 24 / Madison Road) – Madison, Eatonton	Eastern terminus
1.000 mi = 1.609 km; 1.000 km = 0.621 mi

Browse numbered routes
← SR 299	GA	→ US 301

== State Route 304 ==
State Route 304
- U.S. Route 221
- Location: Columbia County
- Length: 6 mi (9.7 km)
- Existed: 1957–1987

State Route 304 (SR 304) was a north–south state highway that was located in the east-central part of the state. It was completely within Columbia County. Between June 1955 and July 1957, it was established from US 221/SR 47 just north of Appling north-northeast to US 221/SR 104/SR 150 in Pollards Corner. It was completely concurrent with US 221. The entire length of US 221/SR 304 was paved. In 1987, SR 47 between Appling and Leah was shifted eastward to travel concurrently with US 221. This necessitated a decommissioning of SR 304.

== State Route 312 ==
State Route 312
- Location: Bainbridge–Whigham
- Length: 15.4 mi (24.8 km)
- Existed: 1960–1980

State Route 312 (SR 312) was an east–west state highway that was located in the southwestern part of the state. Between July 1957 and June 1960, it was established from US 27 Bus./US 84 Bus./SR 38 in Bainbridge to US 84/SR 38 in Whigham. The portion of SR 312 from Bainbridge to SR 262 north-northeast of Climax was paved. From that point to Whigham had a "topsoil or gravel, unpaved" surface. By the middle of 1963, the eastern part of the highway was also paved. In 1980, SR 312 was decommissioned.

Browse numbered routes
← SR 311	GA	→ SR 313

== State Route 318 ==
State Route 318
- Location: Dawson County
- Length: 6.351 mi (10.221 km)
- Existed: 1960–1985

State Route 318 (SR 318) was a west–east state highway that existed in the north-central part of the state. It traveled completely within Dawson County. Between July 1957 and June 1960, it was established from the Dawson Demonstration Forest and Wildlife Management Area south-southwest of Dawsonville to SR 53 southeast of that city. The entire length of the highway was paved. By the middle of 1963, it was extended south-southeast on a concurrency with SR 53, then solely east and southeast to War Hill Park northeast of Chestatee. In 1971, the western terminus was truncated to SR 9 south of Dawsonville. In 1980, the eastern terminus was truncated to SR 53. In 1985, SR 318 was decommissioned.

Browse numbered routes
← SR 317	GA	→ US 319

== State Route 319 ==
State Route 319
- Location: Barrow and Jackson counties
- Length: 6.2 mi (10.0 km)
- Existed: 1960–1990

State Route 319 (SR 319) was a state highway that existed in the north-central part of the state. It traversed the northeastern part of Barrow County and the south-central part of Jackson County. Between July 1957 and June 1960, it was established from SR 211 north-northwest of Statham to US 129/SR 24 about halfway between Arcade and Jefferson. The entire highway was paved at this time. The highway was virtually unchanged for the next 3 decades. In 1990, it was decommissioned.

Major intersections

County	Location	mi	km	Destinations	Notes
Barrow		0.0	0.0	SR 211	Southern terminus
Jackson		6.2	10.0	US 129 / SR 11	Northern terminus
1.000 mi = 1.609 km; 1.000 km = 0.621 mi

Browse numbered routes
← US 319	GA	→ SR 320

== State Route 321 ==
State Route 321
- Location: Bryan and Bulloch counties
- Existed: 1960–1967

State Route 321 (SR 321) was a short-lived state highway that existed in the eastern part of the state. It traversed the northwestern part of Bryan County and the southeastern part of Bulloch County. Between July 1957 and June 1960, it was established from US 280/SR 30/SR 63 in Pembroke north-northeast to SR 119 west-northwest of Blitchton. The entire Bryan County portion was paved, while the entire Bulloch County portion had a "topsoil or gravel, unpaved" surface. By the middle of 1963, the Bulloch County portion was paved. SR 321 was designated on a separate segment from US 80/SR 26 south-southeast of Stilson, then northeast and north-northwest to SR 119 southwest of Guyton. From the southern terminus of this segment to the turn to the north-northwest had a topsoil or gravel, unpaved surface; while the rest of it was paved. There was no indication if the two segments were connected via concurrencies with SR 119 and US 80/SR 26 or if they were two separate segments. By the end of 1966, SR 119's segment at the northern terminus of the original segment was redesignated as part of SR 46. SR 321's southern segment was extended on a direct connection with the newer segment. The central portion of the newer segment was hard surfaced. In 1967, SR 119 was re-routed southward, replacing all of SR 321. The former path of SR 119 through Stilson was redesignated as SR 119 Conn.

== State Route 322 ==
State Route 322
- Location: Emanuel–Toombs counties
- Existed: 1960–1966

State Route 322 (SR 322) was a state highway in the central part of the state. Between 1957 and the end of 1960, it was established from US 1/SR 4/SR 46 in Oak Park then south-southeast to SR 292 east of Lyons. In the middle of the 1960s, its entire length was redesignated as an eastern extension of SR 86.

== State Route 333 (1960s–1980s) ==
State Route 333
- Location: Thomas, Mitchell, Dougherty, Lamar, Pike, Spalding, Henry, and Clayton counties
- Existed: 1963–1982

State Route 333 (SR 333) was a north–south state highway that existed in two separate segments in the state. The highway traversed portions of Thomas, Mitchell, Dougherty, Lamar, Pike, Spalding, Henry, and Clayton counties.

Between June 1960 and June 1963, the highway was established on US 19 from the Florida state line to Camilla. This truncated SR 35, which was concurrent with US 19 from the Florida state line to Thomasville. The segment of US 19 between Thomasville and Meigs, with which SR 3 was concurrent was redesignated as US 19 Bus. SR 333 was established on a sole routing from Camilla to the eastern part of Albany, while US 19/SR 3 traveled on a slightly more western path. SR 333 was also established on US 19/US 41 from SR 16 in Griffin to an indeterminate location between Jonesboro and Hapeville. From Griffin to Lovejoy and in Jonesboro, SR 3 traveled on a more eastern path. Between Lovejoy and Jonesboro and from north-northwest of Jonesboro, US 19/US 41/SR 3/SR 333 traveled concurrently. By 1966, US 19 between Camilla and Albany was shifted eastward to travel concurrently with SR 333. It was unclear if the northern terminus of SR 333 was truncated to Lovejoy or not. That year, SR 333 was indicated to be "projected mileage" from an unnumbered road in the southern part of Barnesville, then west-northwest and north-northwest through Aldora, then north-northeast past US 41/SR 7, then north-northwest through Milner, then northwest and north-northwest past US 19/SR 3 south of Griffin, then north-northwest through the western part of Griffin to connect with the US 19/US 41/SR 3/SR 333 intersection with SR 92 in the northern part of the city. The next year, US 341's path through the Barnesville–Aldora area was shifted southwestward to travel concurrently with SR 333 from just south of Barnesville to US 41/SR 7 Conn. just north of the city. SR 333 was indicated to be projected mileage and under construction from this intersection to the US 19/US 41/SR 3/SR 92/SR 333 intersection in Griffin. In 1968, the highway was indicated to be projected mileage from the US 19/US 82/SR 50S/SR 333 and US 19/SR 3W intersections in Albany. The under construction segment from just north of Barnesville to south of Griffin was completed. The next year, the portion of SR 333 from just north of Barnesville to Griffin was decommissioned.

In 1970, all of SR 333 north of Griffin was also decommissioned. In 1974, a freeway was built in Albany, with SR 333 designated on it. Three years later, US 19 through the main part of Albany was shifted northeast to travel concurrently with the SR 333 freeway. By March 1980, US 82 in Albany was also shifted onto the freeway. Later that year, the northern terminus of SR 333 was truncated to the US 19/US 19 Bus./US 82/US 82 Bus./SR 50/SR 50 Bus./SR 62/SR 333 interchange in Albany, with SR 50 shifted onto the freeway. In 1982, all of SR 333 that remained was redesignated as SR 300. SR 333 was reused in 1993 for part of the old alignment of SR 33, which was rerouted over part of SR 133. SR 133 took over part of the old alignment of SR 33 and took over a portion of SR 94.

=== State Route 333 Spur ===
State Route 333 Spur
- Location: Albany
- Existed: 1976–1980

State Route 333 Spur (SR 333 Spur) was a proposed spur route of SR 333 that was planned to be put inside the city limits of Albany. In 1976, it was indicated to be "projected mileage" from the SR 333 freeway just north of the Clark Avenue interchange and northeast to Turner Field Road. In 1980, it was deleted, never having been built.

== State Route 336 ==
State Route 336
- Rock Creek Road; Brookhaven Circle
- Location: Stephens County
- Existed: 1960–1982

State Route 336 (SR 336) was a state highway that existed in the northeastern part of the state. On October 28, 1960, it was established from SR 328 east of Avalon to SR 17 in the southeastern part of Toccoa. The entire highway was paved. On November 29, 1982, the highway was decommissioned. It was locally known as Rock Creek Road, formerly Brookhaven Circle.

Browse numbered routes
← SR 335	GA	→ SR 337

== State Route 340 ==
State Route 340
- Location: Austell–Fair Oaks
- Existed: 1963–1983

State Route 340 (SR 340) was a state highway that existed in the Atlanta metropolitan area. It traversed the northeastern part of Douglas County and the south-central part of Cobb County. The roadway that would eventually become SR 340 was established in 1952 as an unnumbered road from US 78/SR 8 in Austell to SR 3 in Fair Oaks. Between June 1960 and June 1963, this road was designated as SR 340. The entire length of the highway was paved. In 1983, SR 5 was re-routed on a more southerly track, replacing all of SR 340.

Browse numbered routes
← SR 339	GA	→ US 341

== State Route 342 ==
State Route 342
- Location: Dawson County
- Length: 5.240 mi (8.433 km)
- Existed: 1963–1982

State Route 342 (SR 342) was a 5.240-mile-long (8.433 km) state highway that existed in the north-central part of the state. It was completely within Dawson County. On March 28, 1961, it was established from SR 183 southeast of Juno to SR 52 southeast of Amicalola, on the southern edge of the Chattahoochee-Oconee National Forest. The entire highway was paved. On January 18, 1982, it was decommissioned. It is today known as Keith Evans Road from SR 183 to SR 136 and Bailey/Waters Rd from SR 136 to SR 52.

Browse numbered routes
← SR 341	GA	→ SR 343

== State Route 343 ==
State Route 343
- Location: Tallulah Falls–Wiley
- Existed: 1963–1965

State Route 343 (SR 343) was a short-lived state highway that existed in the northeastern part of the state. It was completely within Rabun County. Between June 1960 and June 1963, it was established on a concurrency with US 23, US 441, and possibly SR 15 from Tallulah Falls and Wiley. The entire path of this concurrency was paved. By the end of 1965, it was decommissioned, with US 23/US 441/SR 15 all traveling on SR 343's former path. The only part today that is not part of US 23/441 is Wylie Connector, which was used as the temporary transition from the new route to the original routing.

== State Route 344 ==
State Route 344
- Location: Rome–Cartersville
- Existed: 1963–1977

State Route 344 (SR 344) was a state highway that existed in the northwestern part of the state. It traversed portions of Floyd and Bartow counties.

The highway that would eventually become SR 344 was established at least as early as 1919 as part of SR 4 from Rome to Cartersville. By the end of 1926, a portion of the highway from just east of Rome to a point northwest of Cartersville was under construction. In the northwestern part of Cartersville and farther to the west, a portion of the highway had a "completed semi hard surface". Within three years, the segment of SR 4 was redesignated as part of SR 20, with US 41W designated on it. The portion of the highway just east of Rome had a "completed hard surface". The highway was under construction northwest of Cartersville.

By the middle of 1930, the entire Rome–Cartersville segment had a completed hard surface. Before the end of 1934, US 41W between Rome and Cartersville was redesignated as part of US 411. In 1953, a small portion of SR 20 in the northern part of Cartersville was hard surfaced. A few years later, all portions of SR 20 that had been built were paved. Between 1960 and 1963, US 411 between Rome and Cartersville was shifted on a more southerly routing, concurrent with SR 344, which was commissioned at this time; SR 20 remained on the old alignment. In 1977, SR 344 was decommissioned, and SR 20 was shifted onto US 411 between Rome and Cartersville. SR 20's old alignment was redesignated as part of SR 293.

== State Route 345 ==
State Route 345
- Location: Catoosa and Floyd counties
- Existed: September 1962–December 1962

State Route 345 (SR 345) was a state highway that was assigned to what is now SR 100 from SR 20 west of Coosa to SR 114 in Summerville in Catoosa and Floyd counties. It existed from September 1962 to December 12, 1962.

== State Route 346 ==
State Route 346
- Location: Jackson County
- Length: 5.36 mi (8.63 km)
- Existed: 1963–2004

State Route 346 (SR 346) was a short east–west state highway that existed in the north-central part of the state. It was completely within Jackson County. Between June 1960 and June 1963, it was established from US 129/SR 11 in Talmo to SR 82 Spur northeast of the city. the entire highway was paved. In 1966, SR 82 Spur and SR 82 swapped paths in the area. In 2004, SR 346 was decommissioned.

Browse numbered routes
← SR 345	GA	→ SR 347

== State Route 349 ==
State Route 349
- Location: Flintstone–Rossville
- Existed: 1963–1986

State Route 349 (SR 349) was an east–west state highway that existed in the northwestern part of the state. It traveled entirely within the northern part of Walker County. Between June 1960 and June 1963, it was established from SR 193 in Flintstone to US 27/SR 1 in Rossville. In 1986, it was decommissioned.

== State Route 350 ==
State Route 350
- Location: Athens
- Existed: 1963–1966

State Route 350 (SR 350) was a state highway that existed in the Athens – Clarke County metropolitan area. It was entirely in Clarke County and the city limits of Athens. Between June 1960 and June 1963, it was established from US 129/SR 15 in the northwestern part of the city to US 29/SR 8 in the northeastern part. The entire divided highway was paved. By the end of 1965, US 29 was designated on SR 350 from the US 129/SR 15 interchange, which also has US 29 Temp. and US 441 Temp., to the US 29/SR 8 interchange. US 441 Temp. was designated on it from the US 129/SR 15 interchange to the US 441/SR 15 Alt. interchange. A western extension of SR 350, ending at US 29/US 78/SR 8/SR 10, was under construction. Also, SR 350 was under construction east-southeast just slightly from the US 29/SR 8 interchange. In 1966, SR 350 was decommissioned. US 29 was designated on the freeway from the western terminus to where it, as well as SR 8, depart the freeway. This interchange also had SR 8 Bus. and SR 106. SR 8 was designated on the entire length of the freeway. Its former path through the city was redesignated as SR 8 Bus., still concurrent with US 78/SR 10.

== State Route 351 ==
State Route 351
- Location: Clayton and Henry counties
- Length: 13 mi (21 km)
- Existed: 1963–1985

State Route 351 (SR 351) was a 13-mile-long (21 km) state highway that existed in the Atlanta metropolitan area. It traversed portions of Clayton and Henry counties. Between September 1953 and June 1954, the roadway that would eventually become SR 351 was established as an unnumbered road from SR 138 in Jonesboro to US 23/SR 42 east-northeast of Flippen. Between June 1960 and June 1963 SR 351 was designated on this road. In 1985, it was decommissioned.

== State Route 353 ==
State Route 353
- Location: Coffee, Irwin, and Ben Hill counties
- Existed: 1965–1988

State Route 353 (SR 353) was a north–south state highway that was located in the south-central part of the state. It traversed the northwest portion of Coffee County, the extreme northeastern part of Irwin County, and the southeastern part of Ben Hill County. Between June 1960 and June 1963, the roadway that would eventually become SR 353 was established as an unnumbered road built from SR 158 west of Douglas, then north and northwest to SR 268 west-southwest of Broxton. By the end of 1965, SR 353 was designated on this road and extended northwest to the Coffee–Irwin county line. In 1966, SR 353 was proposed to be extended northwest to SR 206 north-northeast of Wray in the southeastern part of Ben Hill County. In 1973, the highway was extended on this planned path. In 1980, it was extended south-southeast around the southwestern part of Douglas to SR 135. In 1988, SR 206 was shifted southeast, replacing all of SR 353. The old route of SR 206 later became SR 706.

== State Route 357 ==
State Route 357
- Location: Columbus
- Length: 15.5 mi (24.9 km)
- Existed: 1965–1983

State Route 357 (SR 357) was a 15.5-mile-long (24.9 km) north–south state highway that was located in the west-central part of the state. It was completely within Muscogee County and the city limits of Columbus. In April 1932, the roadway that would eventually become SR 357 was built as an unnumbered road from the main part of Columbus east to the western edge of Fort Benning. Later that year, SR 103 was designated on this road, with a "completed hard surface". In 1952, an unnumbered road was built from SR 103 in the eastern part of Columbus north-northwest to US 27 Alt./SR 85. Between June 1963 and the end of 1965, SR 103's southern terminus was truncated to Buena Vista Road and Brennan Road in the main part of Columbus. Its former path on Buena Vista Road was redesignated as SR 357. The unnumbered road built a decade before was also numbered as part of SR 357. In 1969, SR 357 was extended south-southwest to SR 85 south of Columbus (now within Fort Benning). This extension replaced SR 1 Spur. In 1983, SR 357 was decommissioned.

== State Route 359 ==
State Route 359
- Location: Chatham County
- Existed: 1965–1968

State Route 359 (SR 359) was a short lived state highway that existed completely within Chatham County, mostly within the city limits of Savannah. Between June 1963 and the end of 1965, it was established from just north of Hunter Air Force Base south of the city to US 17/US 80/SR 25/SR 26S in downtown, traveling on Abercorn Street and 37th Street. In 1968, the entire highway was redesignated as part of SR 204.

== State Route 361 ==
State Route 361
- Location: Bibb County
- Length: 21 mi (34 km)
- Existed: 1967–1982

State Route 361 (SR 361) was a north–south state highway that was located in the central part of the state. It was completely within Bibb County, mostly in the city limits of Macon. Between June 1963 and the end of 1966, the roadway that would eventually become SR 361 was built as Hartley Bridge Road and Mt. Pleasant Church Road south of Macon. In 1967, SR 361 was established from US 41/SR 49/SR 247 south of Macon, west on Hartley Bridge Road and Mt. Pleasant Church Road, then north-northeast on Fulton Mill Road, Heath Road, Tucker Road, and Foster Road, and then northeast on Bass Road to SR 87 east-southeast of Bolingbroke. In 1972, US 23 was shifted onto SR 87. In 1976, US 129 onto US 41/SR 49/SR 247 south of Macon. In 1982, SR 361 was decommissioned.

Browse numbered routes
← SR 360	GA	→ SR 362

== State Route 363 ==
State Route 363
- Location: Saffold–Blakely
- Length: 19 mi (31 km)
- Existed: 1967–1985

State Route 363 (SR 363) was a north–south state highway that was located in the southwestern part of the state. It was completely within Early County. The roadway that would eventually become SR 363 was built in 1952 as an unnumbered road from US 84/SR 38 in Saffold to SR 39 in the southern part of Blakely. The next year, the northern terminus of this road was shifted to SR 62 in the western part of Blakely. In 1966, the northern terminus was shifted back to its original location. In 1967, SR 363 was designated on this road. In 1985, all of SR 363 except for the southern piece was decommissioned. This southern portion was redesignated as part of SR 370.

Browse numbered routes
← SR 362	GA	→ SR 364

=== State Route 363 Spur ===
State Route 363 Spur
- Location: Early County
- Existed: 1967–1985

State Route 363 Spur (SR 363 Spur) was a spur route of SR 363 that existed entirely in the southwestern part of Early County. Between June 1963 and the end of 1966, an unnumbered road was built west-southwest from Cedar Springs. In 1967, SR 363 Spur was designated on this road. In 1985, when SR 363 and SR 363 Spur were decommissioned, SR 273 was extended west-southwest of Cedar Springs. This replaced the eastern part of SR 363 Spur. What was the western part was redesignated as SR 273 Spur.

== State Route 364 ==
State Route 364
- Location: Boston–Quitman
- Existed: 1966–1982

State Route 364 (SR 364) was an east–west state highway that was located in the southern part of the state. It traversed portions of Thomas and Brooks counties. In 1966, it was established from US 84/SR 38 west of Boston to US 84/SR 38 west of Quitman. In 1982, it was decommissioned.

== State Route 366 ==
State Route 366
- Location: Hart County
- Length: 10 mi (16 km)
- Existed: 1967–1990

State Route 366 (SR 366) was a north–south state highway that was located in the northeastern part of the state. It was completely within Hart County. In 1967, it was established from an intersection with SR 51 and SR 77 west of Hartwell, then northwest on a concurrency with SR 77 and solely north-northwest to Interstate 85 (I-85) northeast of Lavonia and just south of Tugaloo State Park. The entire highway was hard surfaced. In 1990, SR 77's path in the Lavonia area was shifted northeast, replacing all of SR 366. Its former path was redesignated as SR 77 Conn.

Browse numbered routes
← SR 365	GA	→ SR 367

== State Route 367 ==
State Route 367
- Location: Whitemarsh Island–Wilmington Island
- Existed: 1969–1985

State Route 367 (SR 367) was an east–west state highway that was located in the east-central part of the state. It was completely within Chatham County in the Savannah metropolitan area. Between June 1963 and the end of 1965, SR 26 Loop was established from US 80/SR 26 in Whitemarsh Island, then southeast over Turner Creek, then northeast and north-northeast to US 80/SR 26 in Wilmington Island. Its entire length was hard surfaced. In 1969, it was redesignated as SR 367. In 1985, it was decommissioned.

== State Route 371 ==
State Route 371
- Post Road
- Location: Forsyth County
- Length: 6 mi (9.7 km)
- Existed: 1971–2020

State Route 371 (SR 371), locally known as Post Road, was a north–south state highway that was located in Forsyth County. On June 8, 1971, it was established along part of what had been SR 141 a little after a year after SR 369 replaced what had been a disconnected part of SR 141. After US 19 was moved to SR 400 in 1981, it became mostly a local farm-to-market road, and its continued existence as a state route was a relic. After widening and reconstruction of nearby Bethelview Road was completed in 2019, SR 141 was extended in early 2020 along Bethelview Road to SR 20. As a nearly mile-for-mile swap, SR 371 subsequently was transferred to local control in 2020.

== State Route 373 ==
State Route 373
- Location: Calhoun–Sonoraville
- Existed: 1972–1977

State Route 373 (SR 373) was an east–west state highway that was located in the northwestern part of the state. It was completely within Gordon County. Between June 1963 and the end of 1965, the roadways that would eventually become SR 373 were built as unnumbered roads. One extended from Calhoun to Cash. The other extended from Cash to SR 53 in Sonoraville. In 1972, SR 373 was designated on both of these roads, starting at SR 156 in Calhoun. In 1977, it was decommissioned.

== State Route 375 ==
State Route 375
- Location: Quitman and Stewart counties

State Route 375 (SR 375) was a very short-lived state highway that existed in the west-central part of the state. It traversed portions of Quitman and Stewart counties. Between June 1963 and the end of 1965, the roadway that would eventually become SR 375 was built as an unnumbered road from Florence north-northeast to Omaha, and then eastward to US 27/SR 1 south-southeast of Louvale. In 1968, this road was extended south-southwest to SR 27 in Georgetown. In early 1972, this road was designated as SR 375. Later that year, it was redesignated as a northern extension of SR 39.

=== State Route 375 Connector ===
State Route 375 Connector
- Location: Florence–Lumpkin
- Existed: 1972–1972

State Route 375 Connector (SR 375 Conn.) was a connector route of SR 375 that existed entirely in Stewart County in the west-central part of the state. In 1970, the roadway that would eventually become SR 375 Conn. was built as an unnumbered road from Florence to US 27/SR 1 in Lumpkin. In early 1972, this road was designated as SR 375 Conn. Later that year, it was redesignated as SR 39 Conn.

== State Route 379 ==
State Route 379
- Henderson Mountain Road
- Location: Pickens County
- Length: 13.5 mi (21.7 km)
- Existed: 1977–1981

State Route 379 (SR 379) was a short-lived east–west state highway that was located completely within Pickens County. It was locally known as Henderson Mountain Road. The roadway that would eventually become SR 379 was established in 1941 as an eastern segment of SR 143 from SR 53 east of Fairmount to SR 5 and SR 53 in Tate. By the end of 1946, the eastern half of this segment had a "sand clay, top soil, or stabilized earth" surface. The western half of it was indicated to be "projected mileage".

By the end of 1960, nearly the entire part of this highway west of the SR 156 intersection was decommissioned. By the end of 1963, this decommissioned part was re-instated. In 1970, a portion of it southeast of the SR 53 intersection was hard surfaced. In 1973, this portion was indicated to be "under construction or projected mileage". In 1977, all of SR 143 from its western terminus to northeast of Sharp Top was redesignated as SR 379; northeast of this point to west of Tate was redesignated as part of SR 108; and from there to Tate was redesignated as SR 108 Conn. In 1981, SR 379 was decommissioned.

== State Route 381 ==
State Route 381
- Location: Dallas–Cross Roads
- Length: 7.6 mi (12.2 km)
- Existed: 1979–1990

State Route 381 (SR 381) was a north–south state highway located in Paulding County in the northwestern part of the state. The roadway that would eventually become SR 381 was built in 1939, when SR 92 was extended from Hiram to Acworth. By the end of 1948, the entire length of SR 92 that would become SR 381 was hard surfaced. In 1966, the Dallas–New Hope segment of SR 92 was shifted to the southeast. Its old alignment became SR 92 Spur. In 1972, the Hiram–New Hope segment of SR 92 was shifted east. Its old alignment between New Hope and Cross Roads became a northeast extension of SR 92 Spur. In 1979, SR 92 Spur was redesignated as SR 381. In 1990, SR 381 was decommissioned.

Browse numbered routes
← SR 380	GA	→ SR 382

== State Route 387 ==
State Route 387
- Location: East Point–College Park
- Length: 2.9 mi (4.7 km)
- Existed: 1990–1991

State Route 387 (SR 387) was a very short-lived state highway that existed in the Atlanta metropolitan area. It traversed portions of Fulton and Clayton counties. In 1990, it was established on Camp Creek Parkway from Interstate 285 (I-285) in East Point to I-85 in College Park. The next year, it was decommissioned.

Major intersections

County	Location	mi	km	Destinations	Notes
Fulton	East Point	0.0	0.0	I-285	Western terminus; I-285 exit 3
Clayton	No major junctions				
Fulton	College Park	2.8	4.5	US 29 / SR 14 / SR 139 (Main Street)	
Fulton–Clayton county line	College Park	2.9	4.7	I-85 – Columbus, Montgomery	Eastern terminus; I-85 exit 18A
1.000 mi = 1.609 km; 1.000 km = 0.621 mi

Browse numbered routes
← SR 385	GA	→ SR 388

== State Route 407 Loop ==
State Route 407 Loop
- Location: Sandy Springs
- Existed: 1990–1994

State Route 407 Loop (SR 407 Loop) was a loop route of SR 407, an unsigned designation along I-285 (similar to SR 404 Spur in Savannah). It traveled off I-285 (now Glenridge Drive), and then turned left onto Dunwoody–Peachtree Road by Saint Joseph's Hospital of Atlanta to I-285 (SR 407) once again. The route was officially removed in 1994.
