= Georgia State Route 213 =

State highway in Central Georgia, United States

State Route 213

Route information
- Maintained by the State Highway Board of Georgia
- Length: 34.5 mi (55.5 km)
- Existed: 1941–1982
- History: SR 213 originally served Walton County after commissioning.

Major junctions
- South end: SR 16 in Eatonton
- SR 300 in the Oconee National Forest; SR 83 in southern Morgan County; SR 213 Spur in Pennington; SR 142 / SR 229 from Morrow to Newborn; SR 11 in Mansfield
- North end: SR 36 south of Covington

Location
- Country: United States
- State: Georgia
- Counties: Putnam, Morgan, Jasper, Newton

Highway system
- Georgia State Highway System; Interstate; US; State; Special
← SR 212	→ SR 214

State Route 213 (SR 213) was a state highway that existed in the central part of the U.S. state of Georgia. It traversed through parts of Putnam, Morgan, Jasper, Newton, and Walton counties. Its southern terminus was at SR 16 in central Putnam County, while its northern terminus was at SR 36 south of Covington. It was a major route through the Oconee National Forest. Major settlements along former the route include Eatonton, Godfrey, Newborn, and Mansfield.

== History ==
The roadway that would eventually become SR 213 was built between 1921 and the end of 1926 as an unnumbered road from SR 11 in Social Circle to SR 12 southeast of the city. Its entire length had a "sand clay or top soil" surface. In 1930, it was designated as SR 60. In 1937, part of SR 142 was established on a path from Farrar to Newborn. At the end of 1940, SR 60 was redesignated as SR 181. The segment of SR 142 was under construction. At the end of the next year, SR 181 was redesignated as SR 213. In 1942, SR 142's segment had completed grading, but was not surfaced. The next year, SR 213 was designated on a southern segment. It extended from SR 36 south of Covington, then southeast and east to SR 11 in Mansfield. It may have also been designated from Mansfield east-northeast to SR 142 in Newborn and then north-northwest to SR 12 east of Covington; however, these segments were not specifically designated on maps. The SR 142 segment had a sand clay or top soil surface.

By the end of 1946, the northern segment of SR 213 was redesignated as SR 229, which was also designated on the segment of roadway from Newborn to east of Covington. The Mansfield–Newborn segment of SR 213 was hard surfaced. By the end of 1948, SR 213 was extended east-southeast from Newborn to SR 83 in Pennington. From its western terminus to just west-southwest of Mansfield, and from east-southeast of Newborn to Pennington, the highway had a "sand clay, top soil, or stabilized earth" surface. From just west-southwest of Mansfield to east-southeast of Newborn, which included the SR 142 segment (with which SR 213 had a brief concurrency), it was hard surfaced. In 1953, the segment of SR 213 from east-southeast of Newborn to Pennington was hard surfaced. From its western terminus to just west of Mansfield, it had completed grading, but was not surfaced. Between 1955 and the middle of 1957, the western end of SR 213 was paved. At the end of the 1950s, all of the highway was paved. In 1972, SR 213 was extended southward from Pennington to Eatonton. In 1982, SR 213 was decommissioned.

== Major intersections ==
This table shows SR 213's junctions in 1973.

County	Location	mi	km	Destinations	Notes
Putnam	Eatonton	0.0	0.0	SR 16 (Monticello Road) to US 441 – Monticello, Sparta	Southern terminus
Putnam	Oconee National Forest	5.1	8.2	SR 300 east (Glades Road) to US 441	Southern end of SR 300 concurrency
Putnam	Oconee National Forest	5.2	8.4	SR 300 west (Glades Road) – Monticello	Northern end of SR 300 concurrency
Morgan		14.6	23.5	SR 83 south (Monticello Road) – Monticello	Southern end of SR 83 concurrency
Morgan	Pennington	16.2	26.1	SR 83 north (Monticello Road) – Madison	Northern end of SR 83 concurrency
Morgan	Pennington	16.8	27.0	SR 213 Spur east (Newton Road)	Western terminus of SR 213 Spur
Jasper	Morrow	22.6	36.4	SR 142 east / SR 229 south – Farrar, Monticello, Shady Dale, Eatonton	Southern end of SR 142 and SR 229 concurrencies
Newton	Newborn	25.4	40.9	SR 142 west / SR 229 north to US 278 – Covington	Northern end of SR 142 and SR 229 concurrencies
Newton	Mansfield	27.4	44.1	SR 11 – Covington, Monticello	
Newton		34.5	55.5	SR 36 – Social Circle, Jackson, Covington	Northern terminus
1.000 mi = 1.609 km; 1.000 km = 0.621 mi: Concurrency terminus
