= Georgia's 10th congressional district =

U.S. House district for Georgia

Coordinates: 33°25′27″N 83°03′44″W

- Interactive map of district boundaries since January 3, 2025
- Representative: Mike Collins; R–Jackson
- Distribution: 56.03% urban; 43.97% rural
- Population (2025): 851,615
- Median household income: $81,924
- Ethnicity: 62.5% White; 23.3% Black; 7.6% Hispanic; 3.6% Two or more races; 2.2% Asian; 0.7% other
- Cook PVI: R+11

Georgia's 10th congressional district is a congressional district in the U.S. state of Georgia. The district is currently represented by Republican Mike Collins, and includes a large swath of urban and rural territory between Atlanta and Augusta.

The district's boundaries were redrawn following the 2010 census, which granted an additional congressional seat to Georgia. The first election using the new district boundaries (listed below) were the 2012 congressional elections.

Located in the eastern part of the state, the district boundaries include the cities of Athens, Eatonton, Jackson, Monroe, Washington, Watkinsville, and Winder.

== Composition ==
For the 119th and successive Congresses (based on the districts drawn following a 2023 court order), the district contains all or portions of the following counties and communities.

Barrow County (7)

All seven communities

Butts County (3)

All three communities

Clarke County (3)

All three communities

Elbert County (3)

All three communities

Franklin County (7)

All seven communities

Greene County (5)

All five communities

Gwinnett County (1)

Dacula (part; also 9th)

Hancock County (1)

Sparta

Hart County (6)

All six communities

Henry County (4)

Heron Bay (part; also 3rd; shared with Spalding County), Locust Grove, McDonough (part; also 3rd), Stockbridge (part; also 13th)

Jasper County (2)

Monticello, Shady Dale

Madison County (6)

All six communities

Morgan County (5)

All five communities

Newton County (4)

Covington (part; also 13th), Mansfield, Newborn, Oxford (part; also 13th)

Oconee County (4)

All four communities

Oglethorpe County (4)

All four communities

Putnam County (2)

Crooked Creek, Eatonton

Taliaferro County (2)

Crawfordville, Sharon

Walton County (7)

All seven communities

Wilkes County (2)

Rayle, Tignall

== Recent election results from statewide races ==
Year	Office	Results
2008	President	McCain 61% - 38%
2012	President	Romney 64% - 36%
2016	President	Trump 62% - 35%
2016	Senate	Isakson 64% - 31%
2018	Governor	Kemp 62% - 37%
2018	Lt. Governor	Duncan 63% - 37%
2018	Attorney General	Carr 63% - 37%
2020	President	Trump 60% - 39%
2021	Senate (Reg.)	Perdue 60% - 40%
2021	Senate (Spec.)	Loeffler 60% - 40%
2022	Senate	Walker 60% - 40%
2022	Governor	Kemp 64% - 36%
2022	Lt. Governor	Jones 62% - 36%
2022	Secretary of State	Raffensperger 63% - 34%
2022	Attorney General	Carr 62% - 37%
2024	President	Trump 60% - 39%

== List of members representing the district ==
Name	Party	Years	Cong ress	Electoral history	District location
District created March 4, 1885
George Barnes (Augusta)	Democratic	March 4, 1885 – March 3, 1891	49th 50th 51st	Elected in 1884. Re-elected in 1886. Re-elected in 1888. [data missing]	1885–1893; Burke, Columbia, Glascock, Jefferson, Johnson, Lincoln, McDuffie, Richmond, Taliaferro, Warren, and Washington.
Thomas E. Watson (Thomson)	Populist	March 4, 1891 – March 3, 1893	52nd	Elected in 1890. Lost re-election.	1885–1893; Burke, Columbia, Glascock, Jefferson, Johnson, Lincoln, McDuffie, Richmond, Taliaferro, Warren, and Washington.
James C. C. Black (Augusta)	Democratic	March 4, 1893 – March 3, 1895	53rd	Elected in 1892. Resigned amidst contested election.	1893–1909 [data missing]
Vacant		March 4, 1895 – October 2, 1895	54th		1893–1909 [data missing]
James C. C. Black (Augusta)	Democratic	October 2, 1895 – March 3, 1897	54th	Elected to finish his own term. Retired.	1893–1909 [data missing]
William Henry Fleming (Augusta)	Democratic	March 4, 1897 – March 3, 1903	55th 56th 57th	Elected in 1896. Re-elected in 1898. Re-elected in 1900. Lost renomination.	1893–1909 [data missing]
Thomas W. Hardwick (Sandersville)	Democratic	March 4, 1903 – November 2, 1914	58th 59th 60th 61st 62nd 63rd	Elected in 1902. Re-elected in 1904. Re-elected in 1906. Re-elected in 1908. Re-elected in 1910. Re-elected in 1912. Resigned when elected U.S. senator.	1893–1909 [data missing]
Thomas W. Hardwick (Sandersville)	Democratic	March 4, 1903 – November 2, 1914	58th 59th 60th 61st 62nd 63rd	Elected in 1902. Re-elected in 1904. Re-elected in 1906. Re-elected in 1908. Re-elected in 1910. Re-elected in 1912. Resigned when elected U.S. senator.	1909–1913 [data missing]
Thomas W. Hardwick (Sandersville)	Democratic	March 4, 1903 – November 2, 1914	58th 59th 60th 61st 62nd 63rd	Elected in 1902. Re-elected in 1904. Re-elected in 1906. Re-elected in 1908. Re-elected in 1910. Re-elected in 1912. Resigned when elected U.S. senator.	1913–1917 [data missing]
Vacant		November 2, 1914 – November 3, 1914	63rd		1913–1917 [data missing]
Carl Vinson (Milledgeville)	Democratic	November 3, 1914 – March 3, 1933	63rd 64th 65th 66th 67th 68th 69th 70th 71st 72nd	Elected to finish Hardwick's term. Re-elected in 1914. Re-elected in 1916. Re-elected in 1918. Re-elected in 1920. Re-elected in 1922. Re-elected in 1924. Re-elected in 1926. Re-elected in 1928. Re-elected in 1930. Redistricted to the 6th district.	1913–1917 [data missing]
Carl Vinson (Milledgeville)	Democratic	November 3, 1914 – March 3, 1933	63rd 64th 65th 66th 67th 68th 69th 70th 71st 72nd	Elected to finish Hardwick's term. Re-elected in 1914. Re-elected in 1916. Re-elected in 1918. Re-elected in 1920. Re-elected in 1922. Re-elected in 1924. Re-elected in 1926. Re-elected in 1928. Re-elected in 1930. Redistricted to the 6th district.	1917–1927 [data missing]
Carl Vinson (Milledgeville)	Democratic	November 3, 1914 – March 3, 1933	63rd 64th 65th 66th 67th 68th 69th 70th 71st 72nd	Elected to finish Hardwick's term. Re-elected in 1914. Re-elected in 1916. Re-elected in 1918. Re-elected in 1920. Re-elected in 1922. Re-elected in 1924. Re-elected in 1926. Re-elected in 1928. Re-elected in 1930. Redistricted to the 6th district.	1927–1933 [data missing]
Charles Hillyer Brand (Athens)	Democratic	March 4, 1933 – May 17, 1933	73rd	Elected in 1932. Died.	1933–1965 [data missing]
Vacant		May 17, 1933 – July 5, 1933	73rd		1933–1965 [data missing]
Paul Brown (Elberton)	Democratic	July 5, 1933 – January 3, 1961	73rd 74th 75th 76th 77th 78th 79th 80th 81st 82nd 83rd 84th 85th 86th	Elected to finish Brand's term. Re-elected in 1934. Re-elected in 1936. Re-elected in 1938. Re-elected in 1940. Re-elected in 1942. Re-elected in 1944. Re-elected in 1946. Re-elected in 1948. Re-elected in 1950. Re-elected in 1952. Re-elected in 1954. Re-elected in 1956. Re-elected in 1958. Retired.	1933–1965 [data missing]
Robert Grier Stephens Jr. (Athens)	Democratic	January 3, 1961 – January 3, 1977	87th 88th 89th 90th 91st 92nd 93rd 94th	Elected in 1960. Re-elected in 1962. Re-elected in 1964. Re-elected in 1966. Re-elected in 1968. Re-elected in 1970. Re-elected in 1972. Re-elected in 1974. Retired.	1933–1965 [data missing]
Robert Grier Stephens Jr. (Athens)	Democratic	January 3, 1961 – January 3, 1977	87th 88th 89th 90th 91st 92nd 93rd 94th	Elected in 1960. Re-elected in 1962. Re-elected in 1964. Re-elected in 1966. Re-elected in 1968. Re-elected in 1970. Re-elected in 1972. Re-elected in 1974. Retired.	1965–1973; Baldwin, Clarke, Columbia, Glascock, Greene, Hancock, Jasper, Jefferson, Lincoln, McDuffie, Morgan, Newton, Oconee, Oglethorpe, Putnam, Richmond, Taliaferro, Walton, Warren, Washington, and Wilkes.
Robert Grier Stephens Jr. (Athens)	Democratic	January 3, 1961 – January 3, 1977	87th 88th 89th 90th 91st 92nd 93rd 94th	Elected in 1960. Re-elected in 1962. Re-elected in 1964. Re-elected in 1966. Re-elected in 1968. Re-elected in 1970. Re-elected in 1972. Re-elected in 1974. Retired.	1973–1983 [data missing]
Doug Barnard Jr. (Augusta)	Democratic	January 3, 1977 – January 3, 1993	95th 96th 97th 98th 99th 100th 101st 102nd	Elected in 1976. Re-elected in 1978. Re-elected in 1980. Re-elected in 1982. Re-elected in 1984. Re-elected in 1986. Re-elected in 1988. Re-elected in 1990. Retired.	1973–1983 [data missing]
Doug Barnard Jr. (Augusta)	Democratic	January 3, 1977 – January 3, 1993	95th 96th 97th 98th 99th 100th 101st 102nd	Elected in 1976. Re-elected in 1978. Re-elected in 1980. Re-elected in 1982. Re-elected in 1984. Re-elected in 1986. Re-elected in 1988. Re-elected in 1990. Retired.	1983–1993; Barrow, Clarke, Columbia, Elbert, Lincoln, Madison, McDuffie, Morgan, Oconee, Oglethorpe, Richmond, Walton, Warren, and Wilkes; part of Gwinnett.
Don Johnson Jr. (Royston)	Democratic	January 3, 1993 – January 3, 1995	103rd	Elected in 1992. Lost re-election.	1993–1997; Banks, Barrow, Clarke, Columbia, Elbert, Franklin, Hart, Jackson, Lincoln, Madison, McDuffie, Morgan, Newton, Oconee, Oglethorpe, and Walton; parts of Gwinnett, Richmond, and Wilkes.
Charlie Norwood (Evans)	Republican	January 3, 1995 – January 3, 2003	104th 105th 106th 107th	Elected in 1994. Re-elected in 1996. Re-elected in 1998. Re-elected in 2000. Redistricted to the 9th district.	1993–1997; Banks, Barrow, Clarke, Columbia, Elbert, Franklin, Hart, Jackson, Lincoln, Madison, McDuffie, Morgan, Newton, Oconee, Oglethorpe, and Walton; parts of Gwinnett, Richmond, and Wilkes.
Charlie Norwood (Evans)	Republican	January 3, 1995 – January 3, 2003	104th 105th 106th 107th	Elected in 1994. Re-elected in 1996. Re-elected in 1998. Re-elected in 2000. Redistricted to the 9th district.	1997–2003; Baldwin, Burke, Butts, Columbia, Elbert, Emanuel, Glascock, Greene, Hancock, Jasper, Jefferson, Johnson, Jones, Laurens, Lincoln, McDuffie, Oglethorpe, Putnam, Richmond, Taliaferro, Warren, Washington, Wilkes, and Wilkinson.
Nathan Deal (Clermont)	Republican	January 3, 2003 – January 3, 2007	108th 109th	Redistricted from the 9th district and re-elected in 2002. Re-elected in 2004. Redistricted to the 9th district.	2003–2007 Catoosa, Dade, Dawson, Fannin, Gilmer, Gordon, Hall, Murray, Pickens, Walker, and Whitfield; parts of Forsyth, Gwinnett, Rockdale, and Walton.
Charlie Norwood (Evans)	Republican	January 3, 2007 – February 13, 2007	110th	Redistricted from the 9th district and re-elected in 2006. Died.	2007–2013 Banks, Clarke, Columbia, Elbert, Franklin, Greene, Habersham, Hart, Jackson, Lincoln, Madison, McDuffie, Morgan, Oconee, Oglethorpe, Putnam, Rabun, Stephens, Towns, and Wilkes; part of Richmond.
Vacant		February 13, 2007 – July 17, 2007	110th		2007–2013 Banks, Clarke, Columbia, Elbert, Franklin, Greene, Habersham, Hart, Jackson, Lincoln, Madison, McDuffie, Morgan, Oconee, Oglethorpe, Putnam, Rabun, Stephens, Towns, and Wilkes; part of Richmond.
Paul Broun (Athens)	Republican	July 17, 2007 – January 3, 2015	110th 111th 112th 113th	Elected to finish Norwood's term. Re-elected in 2008. Re-elected in 2010. Re-elected in 2012. Retired to run for U.S. senator.	2007–2013 Banks, Clarke, Columbia, Elbert, Franklin, Greene, Habersham, Hart, Jackson, Lincoln, Madison, McDuffie, Morgan, Oconee, Oglethorpe, Putnam, Rabun, Stephens, Towns, and Wilkes; part of Richmond.
Paul Broun (Athens)	Republican	July 17, 2007 – January 3, 2015	110th 111th 112th 113th	Elected to finish Norwood's term. Re-elected in 2008. Re-elected in 2010. Re-elected in 2012. Retired to run for U.S. senator.	2013–2023 Baldwin, Barrow, Butts, Glascock, Greene, Hancock, Jasper, Jefferson, Johnson, Lincoln, McDuffie, Morgan, Oconee, Oglethorpe, Putnam, Taliaferro, Walton, Warren, Washington, and Wilkes; parts of Clarke, Columbia, Gwinnett, Henry, and Newton.
Jody Hice (Greensboro)	Republican	January 3, 2015 – January 3, 2023	114th 115th 116th 117th	Elected in 2014. Re-elected in 2016. Re-elected in 2018. Re-elected in 2020. Retired to run for Georgia Secretary of State.	2013–2023 Baldwin, Barrow, Butts, Glascock, Greene, Hancock, Jasper, Jefferson, Johnson, Lincoln, McDuffie, Morgan, Oconee, Oglethorpe, Putnam, Taliaferro, Walton, Warren, Washington, and Wilkes; parts of Clarke, Columbia, Gwinnett, Henry, and Newton.
Mike Collins (Jackson)	Republican	January 3, 2023 – present	118th 119th	Elected in 2022. Re-elected in 2024. Retired to run for U.S Senate.	2023–2025
Mike Collins (Jackson)	Republican	January 3, 2023 – present	118th 119th	Elected in 2022. Re-elected in 2024. Retired to run for U.S Senate.	2025–present
Houston Gaines (Athens)	Republican	Assuming office on January 3, 2027		Elected in 2026.	2025–present

== Election results ==
=== 2006 ===
Georgia's 10th Congressional District Election (2006)
Party	Candidate	Votes	%
Republican	Charlie Norwood*	117,721	67.36
Democratic	Terry Holley	57,032	32.64
Total votes		174,753	100.00
Turnout			
Republican hold			

=== 2008 ===
Georgia's 10th Congressional District Election (2008)
Party	Candidate	Votes	%
Republican	Paul Broun*	177,265	60.73
Democratic	Bobby Saxon	114,638	39.27
Total votes		291,903	100.00
Turnout			
Republican hold			

=== 2010 ===
Georgia's 10th Congressional District Election (2010)
Party	Candidate	Votes	%
Republican	Paul Broun*	138,062	67.36
Democratic	Russell Edwards	66,905	32.64
Total votes		204,967	100.00
Turnout			
Republican hold			

=== 2012 ===
Georgia's 10th Congressional District Election (2012)
Party	Candidate	Votes	%
Republican	Paul Broun*	211,065	100.00
Total votes		211,065	100.00
Turnout			
Republican hold			

=== 2014 ===
Georgia's 10th Congressional District Election (2014)
Party	Candidate	Votes	%
Republican	Jody Hice	130,703	66.52
Democratic	Ken Dious	65,777	33.48
Total votes		196,480	100.00
Republican hold			

=== 2016 ===
Georgia's 10th Congressional District Election (2016)
Party	Candidate	Votes	%
Republican	Jody Hice*	243,725	100.00
Total votes		243,725	100.00
Republican hold			

=== 2018 ===
Georgia's 10th Congressional District Election (2018)
Party	Candidate	Votes	%
Republican	Jody Hice*	190,214	62.92
Democratic	Tabitha Johnson-Green	112,117	37.08
Total votes		302,331	100.00
Republican hold			

=== 2020 ===
Georgia's 10th Congressional District Election (2020)
Party	Candidate	Votes	%
Republican	Jody Hice*	235,810	62.31
Democratic	Tabitha Johnson-Green	142,636	37.69
Total votes		378,446	100.00
Republican hold			

=== 2022 ===
Georgia's 10th Congressional District Election (2022)
Party	Candidate	Votes	%
Republican	Mike Collins	198,523	64.53
Democratic	Tabitha Johnson-Green	109,107	35.47
Total votes		307,630	100.00
Republican hold			

=== 2024 ===
Georgia's 10th Congressional District Election (2024)
Party	Candidate	Votes	%
Republican	Mike Collins	256,442	63.05
Democratic	Lexy Doherty	150,271	36.85
Total votes		406,716	100.00
Republican hold			

== See also ==
- Georgia's congressional districts
- List of United States congressional districts
