= Georgia State Route 142 =

State highway in Georgia, United States

State Route 142
- SR 142 highlighted in red

Route information
- Maintained by GDOT
- Length: 36.2 mi (58.3 km)

Major junctions
- West end: SR 81 north of Covington
- I-20 / SR 402 in Covington; US 278 / SR 12 from Covington to west-southwest of Hub Junction
- East end: SR 16 in Willard

Location
- Country: United States
- State: Georgia
- Counties: Newton, Jasper, Putnam

Highway system
- Georgia State Highway System; Interstate; US; State; Special
← SR 141	→ SR 143

State Route 142 (SR 142) is a 36.2-mile-long (58.3 km) state highway that runs northwest–southeast in the central part of the U.S. state of Georgia, within portions of Newton, Jasper, Putnam counties.

== Route description ==
SR 142 begins at an intersection with SR 81, north of Covington, in Newton County. It heads southeast to first meet Interstate 20 (I-20) and then U.S. Route 278 (US 278)/SR 12 in Covington. The three routes head east concurrently and cross over the Alcovy River. SR 142 splits off to the southeast and meets SR 11 (Lamar Hays Memorial Parkway). SR 142 continues to the southeast and intersects SR 213 and SR 229 in Newborn. SR 142 and SR 229 run concurrent through town, and then enter Jasper County. After SR 142 splits off to the southeast, it enters Shady Dale, where it intersects SR 83 (Main Street). The highway enters Putnam County and intersects the route of former SR 300 (Glades Road) in Oconee National Forest. SR 142 continues to the southeast, until it meets its eastern terminus, and intersection with SR 16 (Monticello Road) in Willard, which is located west of Eatonton. Along Road 142 near Covington, there is an observation of Mycteria Americana. This type of bird is a large waterfowl of the Hasididae family with a black head and neck and a white body.

== History ==
In 1994, the State Transportation Board of Georgia designated the section of SR 142 in Newton County from the intersection with SR 81 to the intersection with HWY 278 as the "John R. Williams Highway" after Newton County First National Bank Chairman John R. Williams.

A $12 million widening project was announced in 2009 with a scheduled completion in 2012.

In April 2023, a two vehicle crash occurred on SR 142 in Covington, Georgia.

== Major intersections ==
County	Location	mi	km	Destinations	Notes
Newton		0.0	0.0	SR 81 – Covington, Walnut Grove	Western terminus
Newton	Covington	4.6	7.4	I-20 (Purple Heart Highway / SR 402) – Atlanta, Augusta	I-20 exit 93
Newton	Covington	5.7	9.2	US 278 west / SR 12 west	Western end of US 278/SR 12 concurrency
Newton	Alcovy River	7.3	11.7	Crossing over the Alcovy River	
Newton		8.0	12.9	US 278 west / SR 12 west / SR 36 west (Dr. Martin Luther King Jr. Avenue)	Eastern end of US 278/SR 12 concurrency; eastern terminus of SR 36
Newton		12.3	19.8	SR 11 (Lamar Hays Memorial Parkway) – Monticello, Social Circle	
Newton	Newborn	15.5	24.9	CR 213 north / CR 229 north – Mansfield, Social Circle	Former SR 213 north, former SR 229 north
Jasper	Morrow	18.3	29.5	Broughton Road south – Pennington	Former SR 213 south
Jasper		20.8	33.5	Post Road south / Williams Road north – Monticello	Former SR 229 south
Jasper	Shady Dale	26.7	43.0	SR 83 (Main Street) – Monticello, Madison	
Putnam	Willard	36.2	58.3	SR 16 (Monticello Road) – Monticello, Eatonton	Eastern terminus
1.000 mi = 1.609 km; 1.000 km = 0.621 mi: Concurrency terminus

== See also ==
- Georgia State Route 213
- Georgia State Route 229
