= Georgia State Route 60 (disambiguation) =

Georgia State Route 60 is a state highway from east of Braselton to the Tennessee state line in McCaysville

Georgia State Route 60 could also refer to:

- Georgia State Route 60 (1921–1926): a former state highway that existed from Sterling to south-southwest of Darien
- Georgia State Route 60 (1930–1940): a former state highway that existed from Social Circle to southeast of the city

== See also ==
- Georgia State Route 213
- Georgia State Route 229
