= Godfrey, Georgia =

- Unincorporated community Census-designated place
- Location within Georgia Location within the United States
- Country: United States
- State: Georgia
- County: Morgan

Area
  - Total: 1.083 sq mi (2.80 km^{2})
  - Land: 1.067 sq mi (2.76 km^{2})
  - Water: 0.016 sq mi (0.041 km^{2})
- Elevation: 614 ft (187 m)

Population (2020)
  - Total: 108
  - Density: 101.22/sq mi (39.08/km^{2})
- Time zone: UTC−6 (Central (CST))
  - Summer (DST): UTC−5 (CDT)
- ZIP code: 30650
- Area code: 706
- FIPS code: 13-33672
- GNIS feature ID: 356040

Godfrey is an unincorporated community and census-designated place in Morgan County, in the U.S. state of Georgia. It first appeared as a CDP in the 2020 Census with a population of 108.

== History ==
The community was named after Dr. Ervine Godfrey, a pioneer settler. A post office called Godfrey was established in 1889, and remained in operation until 1965. The Georgia General Assembly incorporated the place as the "Town of Godfrey" in 1906. The town's charter was dissolved in 1995.

== Geography ==
Godfrey is in southern Morgan County, with its southern border following the Putnam County line. It is 12 miles (19 km) south of Madison, the county seat, via Godfrey Road, which continues 13 miles (21 km) south to Eatonton.

According to the U.S. Census Bureau, the Godfrey CDP has a total area of 1.1 square miles (2.8 km^{2}), of which 0.02 square miles (0.05 km^{2}), or 1.48%, are water. The town sits on a ridge which drains west to the Little River and east to Big Indian Creek, a tributary of the Little River, which continues south to the Oconee River north of Milledgeville.

== Demographics ==
Historical population
Census	Pop.	Note	%±
1910	337		—
1920	255		−24.3%
1930	183		−28.2%
1940	197		7.7%
1950	188		−4.6%
1960	181		−3.7%
2020	108		—
U.S. Decennial Census; 1850-1870 1870-1880; 1890-1910 1920-1930; 1940 1950 1960; 1970 1980 1990; 2000 2010-2020

Godfrey was listed as a village in the 1910 through 1960 U.S. Censuses. It was relisted as a census designated place in the 2020 U.S. census.

=== 2020 census ===
Godfrey CDP, Georgia – Racial and ethnic composition Note: the US Census treats Hispanic/Latino as an ethnic category. This table excludes Latinos from the racial categories and assigns them to a separate category. Hispanics/Latinos may be of any race.
Race / Ethnicity (NH = Non-Hispanic)	Pop 2020	% 2020
White alone (NH)	78	72.22%
Black or African American alone (NH)	18	16.67%
Native American or Alaska Native alone (NH)	0	0.00%
Asian alone (NH)	0	0.00%
Pacific Islander alone (NH)	0	0.00%
Some Other Race alone (NH)	0	0.00%
Mixed Race or Multi-Racial (NH)	3	2.78%
Hispanic or Latino (any race)	9	8.33%
Total	108	100.00%
