= Tarboro, Georgia =

Unincorporated community in Georgia, United States

Tarboro
- Unincorporated community
- Tarboro, Georgia
- Location in the State of Georgia
- Coordinates: 31°01′04″N 81°48′19″W
- Country: United States
- State: Georgia
- County: Camden
- Elevation: 32 ft (9.8 m)
- Time zone: UTC−5 (EST)
  - Summer (DST): UTC−4 (EDT)
- ZIP code: 31568 (White Oak)
- Area code: 912
- GNIS feature ID: Populated Place

Tarboro is an unincorporated community located in central Camden County in the U.S. state of Georgia. The settlement is situated inland within the state's Atlantic coastal plain near the Satilla River basin. It is historically significant as a well-preserved, multi-generational African-American community with heritage extending back to the antebellum era.

== History ==
The African-American presence in Tarboro was established prior to the American Civil War, when enslaved populations provided the primary labor force for major regional agricultural operations and timber plantations along local rivers. Following emancipation and the subsequent Reconstruction era, many freedmen successfully acquired acreage in the area, establishing independent family farms throughout the rural interior of Camden County.

During the late 19th and early 20th centuries, local economic activities revolved around traditional agriculture—principally cotton cultivation—supplemented by the commercial harvesting, processing, and transport of Spanish moss and timber manufacturing.

=== Historic Churches ===
Tarboro is anchored by several historic congregations that served as central nodes for communal and spiritual life post-emancipation:

- Providence Methodist Church: Constructed originally in 1856 during the antebellum period, this congregation initially met several miles to the west on Old Post Road before relocating to its current structure. The wood-frame chapel was severely compromised by a hurricane in 1922, which left the building with a structural lean to the right that persists to the present day.
- Clinch Chapel: Traces its roots to an informal brush arbor congregation organized during slavery by Brother Zachery Butler to serve laborers from the neighboring Owens, King, and Clinch plantations. In 1896, a formal wood-frame church building was constructed using timber milled at the Ceylon plantation; the lumber was floated down the Satilla River to Owens Ferry and transported to the site via oxcart. The building was heavily damaged by storms and subsequently rebuilt in 1897 and 1901. The congregation officially aligned with the United Methodist Church in 1968, and a modernized chapel building was completed circa 1992.
- Oak Grove Missionary Baptist Church: Organized in 1899 as the First Baptist Church under its inaugural pastor, Reverend J. Delk. The congregation formally adopted the name Oak Grove Missionary Baptist around 1947 and underwent an extensive architectural remodel in 1991.
- Brown's Chapel A.M.E. Church: Established on July 7, 1900, by the Reverend T. N. M. Smith, Reverend S. W. Wood, and L. Fatio. The current brick-and-wood sanctuary structure was dedicated in 1979 and later updated.

=== Material Culture and Cemeteries ===
The historic cemetery adjacent to Clinch Chapel (historically referenced as Evergreen Cemetery) is known for its collection of localized African-American vernacular grave markers. Modeled and cast in concrete by local artisans between the 1920s and 1940s, these distinctive "Madonna" monuments feature highly stylized, European-influenced relief carvings of the Virgin Mary, erected as specialized memorials for local women who died during childbirth.

== Geography and Infrastructure ==
Tarboro is an isolated, low-elevation rural locality in the interior plain of Camden County, sitting at an approximate elevation of 32 feet (10 m) above mean sea level. The civic layout is defined by the "Tarboro Triangle," a central intersection where Georgia State Route 252 (Burnt Fort Road), Georgia State Route 259, and New Post Road converge.

The physical center of this junction is occupied by Reeds Grocery & Ponderosa, which has historically operated as the primary commercial establishment and community hub for the surrounding rural populace. State Route 259 connects Tarboro westward into neighboring Brantley County, while State Route 252 extends southwest toward Charlton County.

The community does not maintain a dedicated post office or localized delivery infrastructure. Postal services and residential mailing addresses for Tarboro are administered via the post office in nearby White Oak under the ZIP code 31568.
