= Farrar, Georgia =

- Unincorporated community
- Location within Georgia
- Coordinates: 33°27′46″N 83°38′03″W
- Country: United States
- State: Georgia
- County: Jasper
- Elevation: 692 ft (211 m)
- Time zone: UTC-5 (Eastern (EST))
  - Summer (DST): UTC-4 (EDT)
- Postal code: 31085

Farrar is an unincorporated community in Jasper County, Georgia, United States. The community is located along SR 142 approximately fifty miles southeast of Atlanta, Georgia.

== Demographics ==
Historical population
Census	Pop.	Note	%±
1930	15		—
1940	16		6.7%
1950	30		87.5%
1960	42		40.0%
1970	87		107.1%
Sources: U.S. Census Bureau

Farrar, Georgia was first recorded in the 1930 census. As Farrar is no longer an incorporated town, census data is no longer collected on the community as a whole.
