= Wiley, Georgia =

- Unincorporated community
- Location within Georgia
- Coordinates: 34°47′54″N 83°25′13″W
- Country: United States
- State: Georgia
- County: Rabun
- Elevation: 1,732 ft (528 m)
- Time zone: UTC-5 (Eastern (EST))
  - Summer (DST): UTC-4 (EDT)
- ZIP code: 30581
- Area codes: 706 & 762
- GNIS feature ID: 333428

Wiley is an unincorporated community in Rabun County, Georgia, United States. The community is located along U.S. Route 23/441, 5.6 miles (9.0 km) south of Clayton. Wiley has a post office with ZIP code 30581.
