= Ivey, Georgia =

- Town
- Location in Wilkinson County and the state of Georgia
- Coordinates: 32°54′33″N 83°18′3″W
- Country: United States
- State: Georgia
- County: Wilkinson

Area
  - Total: 3.02 sq mi (7.81 km^{2})
  - Land: 2.59 sq mi (6.71 km^{2})
  - Water: 0.42 sq mi (1.10 km^{2})
- Elevation: 358 ft (109 m)

Population (2020)
  - Total: 1,037
  - Density: 400.2/sq mi (154.53/km^{2})
- Time zone: UTC-5 (Eastern (EST))
  - Summer (DST): UTC-4 (EDT)
- ZIP code: 31031
- Area code: 478
- FIPS code: 13-41540
- GNIS feature ID: 0332071

Ivey is a town in Wilkinson County, Georgia, United States. The population was 1,037 in 2020.

== History ==
The community was named after James Ivey. The Georgia General Assembly incorporated Ivey in 1950.

== Geography ==
Ivey is located at 32°54′33″N 83°18′3″W (32.909078, -83.300808). According to the United States Census Bureau, the town has a total area of 3.0 square miles (7.8 km^{2}), of which 2.6 square miles (6.7 km^{2}) is land and 0.4 square miles (1.0 km^{2}) (14.09%) is water.

== Demographics ==
Historical population
Census	Pop.	Note	%±
1950	46		—
1960	48		4.3%
1970	245		410.4%
1980	455		85.7%
1990	1,053		131.4%
2000	1,100		4.5%
2010	981		−10.8%
2020	1,037		5.7%
U.S. Decennial Census

As of the census of 2000, there were 1,100 people, 434 households, and 314 families residing in the town. By 2020, its population was 1,037.
