= Springvale, Georgia =

Unincorporated community in Georgia, U.S.

Coordinates: 31°49′42″N 84°52′47″W

Springvale is an unincorporated community, in Randolph County, in the U.S. state of Georgia.

== History ==
A post office called Springvale was established in 1885, and remained in operation until 1985. The name Springvale was applied to this place for commendatory reasons. A variant name is "Hamlet".

The Georgia General Assembly incorporated Springvale as a town in 1870. The town's municipal charter was repealed in 1995.
