= Crooked Creek, Georgia =

- Unincorporated community Census-designated place
- Location within Georgia
- Coordinates: 33°15′42″N 83°16′04″W
- Country: United States
- State: Georgia
- County: Putnam

Area
  - Total: 3.83 sq mi (9.93 km^{2})
  - Land: 3.23 sq mi (8.37 km^{2})
  - Water: 0.60 sq mi (1.56 km^{2})
- Elevation: 420 ft (130 m)

Population (2020)
  - Total: 685
  - Density: 212.0/sq mi (81.86/km^{2})
- Time zone: UTC-5 (Eastern (EST))
  - Summer (DST): UTC-4 (EDT)
- ZIP code: 31024
- Area codes: 706 & 762
- GNIS feature ID: 2587031

Crooked Creek is an unincorporated community and census-designated place (CDP) in Putnam County, Georgia, United States. Its population was 685 as of the 2020 census. The community is located on the western bank of the Oconee River.

== Demographics ==
Historical population
Census	Pop.	Note	%±
2010	639		—
2020	685		7.2%
U.S. Decennial Census; 1850-1870 1870-1880; 1890-1910 1920-1930; 1930-1940 1940-1950; 1960-1980 1980-2000; 2010 2020

Crooked Creek first appeared as a census designated place in the 2010 U.S. census.

=== Racial and ethnic composition ===
Crooked Creek CDP, Georgia – Racial and ethnic composition Note: the US Census treats Hispanic/Latino as an ethnic category. This table excludes Latinos from the racial categories and assigns them to a separate category. Hispanics/Latinos may be of any race.
Race / Ethnicity (NH = Non-Hispanic)	Pop 2010	Pop 2020	% 2010	% 2020
White alone (NH)	581	595	90.92%	86.86%
Black or African American alone (NH)	41	32	6.42%	4.67%
Native American or Alaska Native alone (NH)	2	0	0.31%	0.00%
Asian alone (NH)	2	3	0.31%	0.44%
Native Hawaiian or Pacific Islander alone (NH)	0	0	0.00%	0.00%
Other race alone (NH)	0	4	0.00%	0.58%
Mixed race or Multiracial (NH)	4	25	0.63%	3.65%
Hispanic or Latino (any race)	9	26	1.41%	3.80%
Total	639	685	100.00%	100.00%
