= Willard, Georgia =

Willard
- Unincorporated community
- Location within the state of Georgia Willard (the United States)
- Coordinates: 33°18′26″N 83°29′2″W
- Country: United States
- State: Georgia
- County: Putnam
- Elevation: 554 ft (169 m)
- Time zone: UTC-5 (Eastern (EST))
  - Summer (DST): UTC-4 (EDT)
- GNIS feature ID: 326414

Willard is an unincorporated community in western Putnam County, Georgia, United States. It lies along State Route 16 between Eatonton and Monticello at an elevation of 554 feet (169 m).
