= Shady Dale, Georgia =

- Town
- Location in Jasper County and the state of Georgia
- Coordinates: 33°23′58″N 83°35′24″W
- Country: United States
- State: Georgia
- County: Jasper

Area
  - Total: 0.89 sq mi (2.30 km^{2})
  - Land: 0.88 sq mi (2.29 km^{2})
  - Water: 0.0039 sq mi (0.01 km^{2})
- Elevation: 620 ft (190 m)

Population (2020)
  - Total: 252
  - Density: 284.8/sq mi (109.95/km^{2})
- Time zone: UTC-5 (Eastern (EST))
  - Summer (DST): UTC-4 (EDT)
- ZIP code: 31085
- Area code: 706
- FIPS code: 13-69784
- GNIS feature ID: 0329643

Shady Dale is a town in Jasper County, Georgia, United States. The population was 252 in 2020.

== History ==
Shady Dale was founded ca. 1880 on the site of a former Creek Indian settlement. The name "Shady Dale" was descriptively applied.

The Georgia General Assembly incorporated Shady Dale as a town in 1889.

== Geography ==
Shady Dale is located in northeastern Jasper County at 33°23′58″N 83°35′24″W (33.399562, -83.589937). Georgia State Routes 83 and 142 intersect in the center of town. GA 83 leads northeast 17 miles (27 km) to Madison and southwest 8 miles (13 km) to Monticello, the Jasper county seat, while GA 142 leads northwest 11 miles (18 km) to Newborn and southeast 9 miles (14 km) to Willard.

According to the United States Census Bureau, the town has a total area of 0.89 square miles (2.3 km^{2}), of which 1.8 acres (7,479 m^{2}), or 0.33%, are water. The east side of town drains toward the Little River, a tributary of the Oconee River, while the west side drains to Murder Creek, a tributary of the Little River.

== Demographics ==
Historical population
Census	Pop.	Note	%±
1890	152		—
1900	300		97.4%
1910	344		14.7%
1920	294		−14.5%
1930	243		−17.3%
1940	159		−34.6%
1950	253		59.1%
1960	201		−20.6%
1970	190		−5.5%
1980	155		−18.4%
1990	180		16.1%
2000	242		34.4%
2010	249		2.9%
2020	252		1.2%
U.S. Decennial Census

As of the census of 2000, there were 242 people, 88 households, and 60 families residing in the town. In 2020, its population was 252.

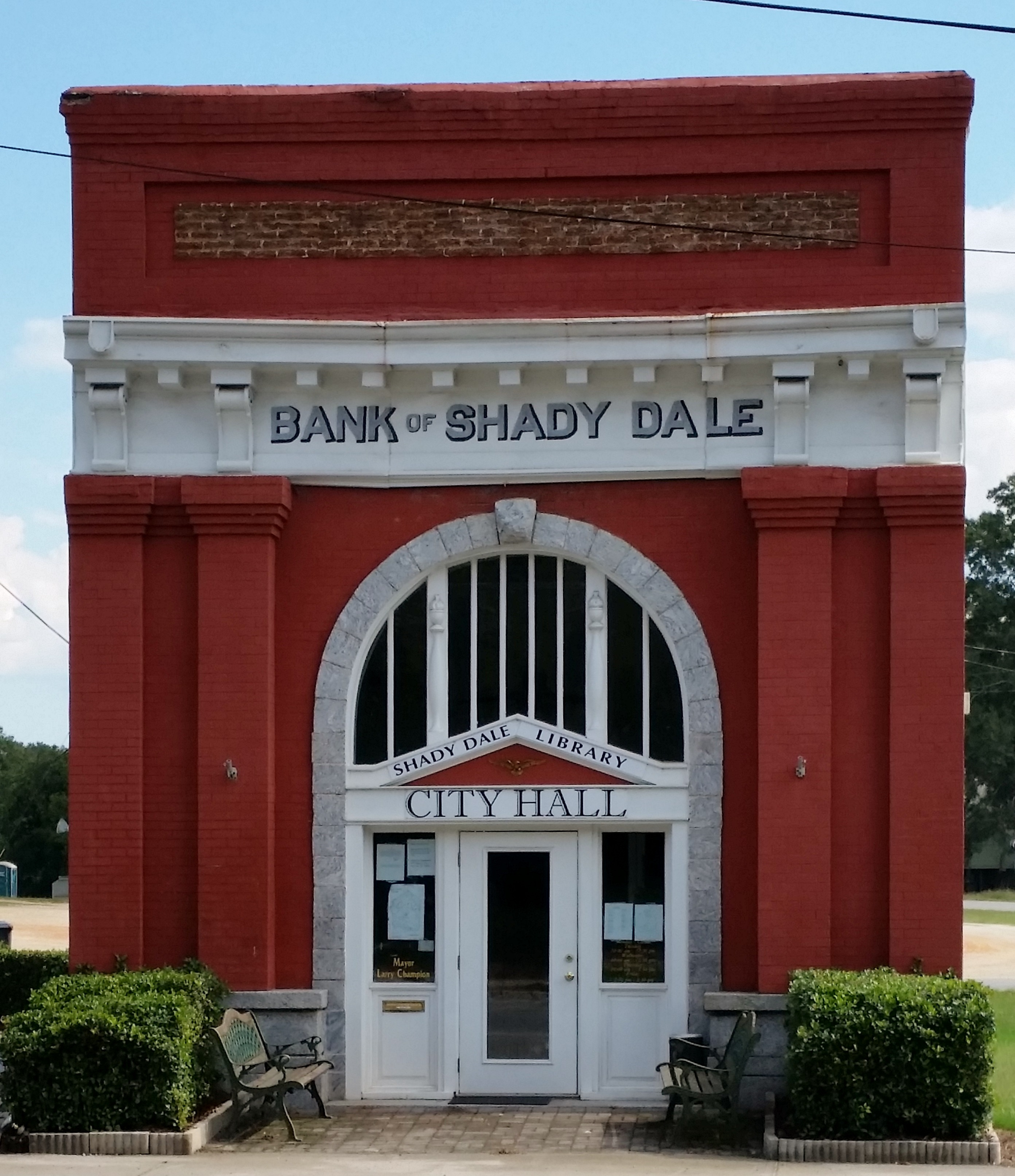
Originally the Bank of Shady Dale, this building is now home to City Hall.

== Arts and culture ==
The town is well known for an annual professional rodeo the first weekend in June each year since 1983. Sanctioned by the I.P.R.A./S.R.A., this rodeo draws champion cowboys and cowgirls from all over the United States. The entire town comes to life with a rodeo parade, wagon train ride and community festival. The event is produced by Walton No. 200 and Jasper No. 50 Masonic Lodges of Jasper County with proceeds benefiting several Masonic charities.
