= Putnam County, Georgia =

County in Georgia, United States

- County
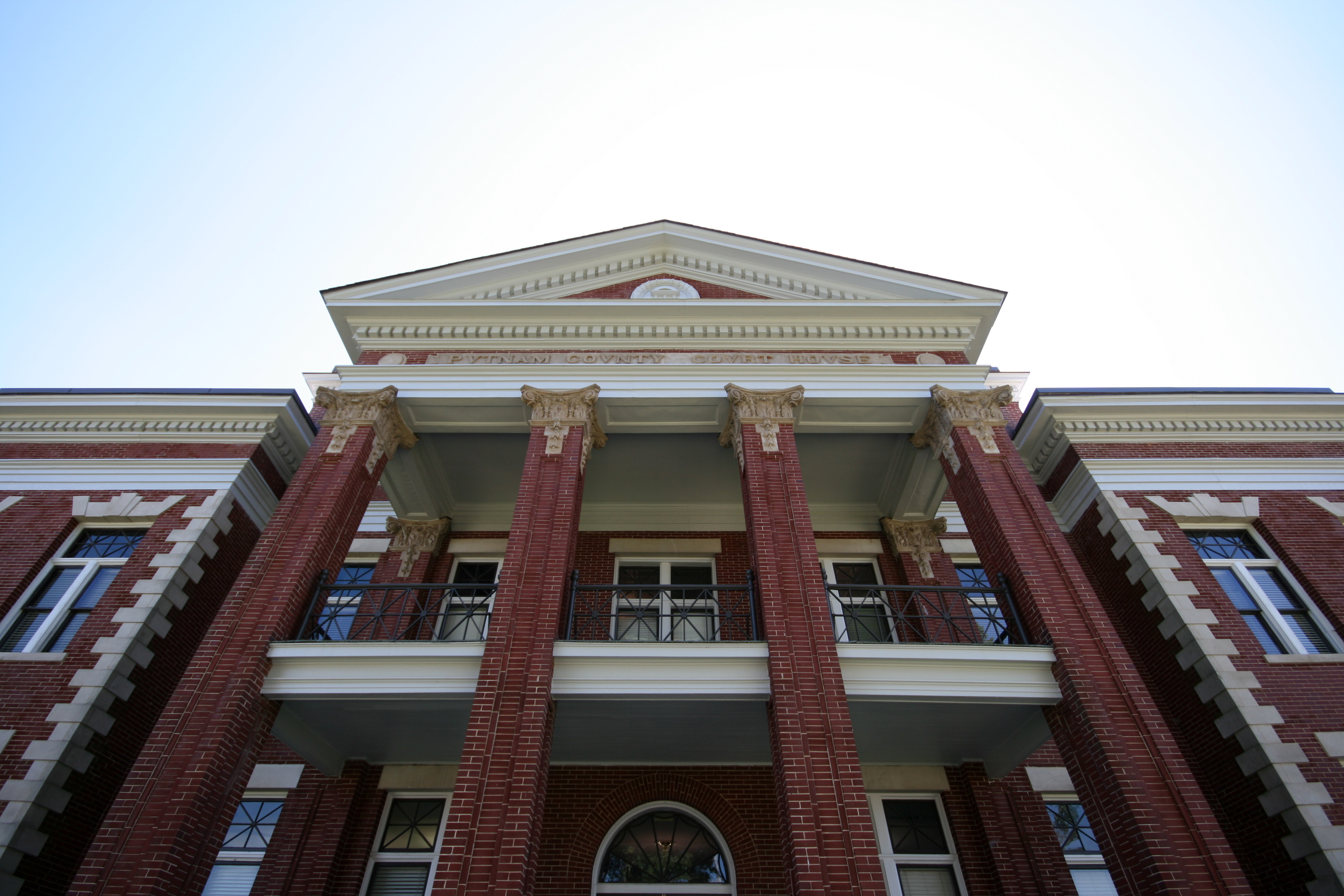
- Putnam County courthouse in Eatonton

- Location within the U.S. state of Georgia
- Coordinates: 33°19′N 83°22′W
- Country: United States
- State: Georgia
- Founded: December 10, 1807; 218 years ago
- Named for: Israel Putnam
- Seat: Eatonton
- Largest city: Eatonton

Area
  - Total: 361 sq mi (930 km^{2})
  - Land: 345 sq mi (890 km^{2})
  - Water: 16 sq mi (41 km^{2}) 4.4%

Population (2020)
  - Total: 22,047
  - Estimate (2025): 23,722 ▲
  - Density: 64/sq mi (25/km^{2})
- Time zone: UTC−5 (Eastern)
  - Summer (DST): UTC−4 (EDT)
- Congressional district: 10th
- Website: www.putnamcountyga.us

Putnam County is a county located in the central portion of the U.S. state of Georgia. As of the 2020 United States census, the population was 22,047. The county seat is Eatonton.

Since the early 21st century, the county has had a housing boom. It has proximity to Lake Oconee, Lake Sinclair, and the Oconee River, all of which are recreation sites, as well as to major employment centers such as Atlanta, Athens, and Macon.

== History ==
Putnam County is named in honor of Israel Putnam, a hero of the French and Indian War and a general in the American Revolutionary War. It was settled by European Americans after the war, as migrants moved down from the Upper South. The county was created on December 10, 1807, by an act of the Georgia General Assembly.

Following the invention of the cotton gin, which could profitably process short-staple cotton, the county was developed for cotton cultivation of that type. It thrived in the upland areas, where plantations were developed and worked by the field labor of thousands of African-American slaves.

During the 1919 Red Summer there were many incidents of racial violence including an arson attack where almost a dozen black community buildings were burnt down in late May 1919. The Wheeling Intelligencer claimed the buildings were burnt down because of a "minor racial clash at Dennis Station." During this time armed black and white mobs patrolled the area in fear of each other.

In the first half of the 20th century, thousands of blacks left the state during the Great Migration from 1920 to 1960. The county population dropped by more than half during this period following mechanization of agriculture and as rural workers moved into cities. Since the late 20th century, population has increased. The white population of the county has grown since the turn of the 21st century: in 2010 African Americans comprised 26 percent of the county population, a drop from nearly 42% in 2000.

In the 21st century, dairy farming is more important to Putnam County than cotton. It annually holds the nationally known Dairy Festival.

== Geography ==
According to the U.S. Census Bureau, the county has a total area of 361 square miles (930 km^{2}), of which 345 square miles (890 km^{2}) is land and 16 square miles (41 km^{2}) (4.4%) is water. The entirety of Putnam County is located in the Upper Oconee River sub-basin of the Altamaha River basin. The county is located in the Piedmont region of the state, with rolling hills, farms, and lakes covering a majority of the county.

=== Major highways ===
- U.S. Route 129
  - U.S. Route 129 Business
- U.S. Route 441 / State Route 24
  - U.S. Route 441 Business / State Route 24 Business
- State Route 16
- State Route 44
- State Route 142
- State Route 212

=== Adjacent counties ===
- Morgan County (north)
- Greene County (northeast)
- Hancock County (east)
- Baldwin County (southeast)
- Jones County (southwest)
- Jasper County (west)

=== National protected area ===
- Oconee National Forest (part)

== Communities ==
=== City ===
- Eatonton

=== Census-designated place ===
- Crooked Creek

=== Unincorporated community ===
- Willard
- Kinderhook
- Rockville
- Dennis Station

== Demographics ==
Historical population
Census	Pop.	Note	%±
1810	10,029		—
1820	15,475		54.3%
1830	13,261		−14.3%
1840	10,260		−22.6%
1850	10,794		5.2%
1860	10,125		−6.2%
1870	10,461		3.3%
1880	14,539		39.0%
1890	14,842		2.1%
1900	13,436		−9.5%
1910	13,876		3.3%
1920	15,151		9.2%
1930	8,367		−44.8%
1940	8,514		1.8%
1950	7,731		−9.2%
1960	7,798		0.9%
1970	8,394		7.6%
1980	10,295		22.6%
1990	14,137		37.3%
2000	18,812		33.1%
2010	21,218		12.8%
2020	22,047		3.9%
2025 (est.)	23,722	▲	7.6%
U.S. Decennial Census; 1790-1880 1890-1910; 1920-1930 1930-1940; 1940-1950 1960-1980; 1980-2000 2010

=== Racial and ethnic composition ===
Putnam County, Georgia – Racial and ethnic composition Note: the US Census treats Hispanic/Latino as an ethnic category. This table excludes Latinos from the racial categories and assigns them to a separate category. Hispanics/Latinos may be of any race.
Race / Ethnicity (NH = Non-Hispanic)	Pop 1980	Pop 1990	Pop 2000	Pop 2010	Pop 2020	% 1980	% 1990	% 2000	% 2010	% 2020
White alone (NH)	5,984	9,253	12,471	14,024	14,316	58.13%	65.45%	66.29%	66.09%	64.93%
Black or African American alone (NH)	4,236	4,719	5,603	5,497	5,385	41.15%	33.38%	29.78%	25.91%	24.43%
Native American or Alaska Native alone (NH)	4	21	36	27	33	0.04%	0.15%	0.19%	0.13%	0.15%
Asian alone (NH)	16	42	125	107	108	0.16%	0.30%	0.66%	0.50%	0.49%
Native Hawaiian or Pacific Islander alone (NH)	x	x	8	9	1	x	x	0.04%	0.04%	0.00%
Other race alone (NH)	3	5	13	23	40	0.03%	0.04%	0.07%	0.11%	0.18%
Mixed race or Multiracial (NH)	x	x	149	184	607	x	x	0.79%	0.87%	2.75%
Hispanic or Latino (any race)	52	97	407	1,347	1,557	0.51%	0.69%	2.16%	6.35%	7.06%
Total	10,295	14,137	18,812	21,218	22,047	100.00%	100.00%	100.00%	100.00%	100.00%

=== 2020 census ===
As of the 2020 census, the county had a population of 22,047. The median age was 48.9 years. 19.1% of residents were under the age of 18 and 25.3% of residents were 65 years of age or older. For every 100 females there were 93.6 males, and for every 100 females age 18 and over there were 92.4 males age 18 and over. 0.0% of residents lived in urban areas, while 100.0% lived in rural areas.

The census recorded 6,282 families residing in the county.

The racial makeup of the county was 66.5% White, 24.6% Black or African American, 0.4% American Indian and Alaska Native, 0.5% Asian, 0.0% Native Hawaiian and Pacific Islander, 2.8% from some other race, and 5.2% from two or more races. Hispanic or Latino residents of any race comprised 7.1% of the population.

There were 9,181 households in the county, of which 25.7% had children under the age of 18 living with them and 27.3% had a female householder with no spouse or partner present. About 25.9% of all households were made up of individuals and 12.9% had someone living alone who was 65 years of age or older.

There were 13,032 housing units, of which 29.6% were vacant. Among occupied housing units, 73.3% were owner-occupied and 26.7% were renter-occupied. The homeowner vacancy rate was 1.8% and the rental vacancy rate was 6.6%.

== Education ==
The Putnam County Charter School System and Gatewood Schools Inc. serve the community.

== Politics ==
As of the 2020s, Putnam County is a strongly Republican voting county, voting 71% for Donald Trump in 2024. For elections to the United States House of Representatives, Putnam County is part of Georgia's 10th congressional district, currently represented by Mike Collins. For elections to the Georgia State Senate, Putnam County is part of District 25. For elections to the Georgia House of Representatives, Putnam County is part of district District 124.

United States presidential election results for Putnam County, Georgia
Year	Republican		Democratic		Third party(ies)	
Year	No.	%	No.	%	No.	%
1912	7	1.49%	460	97.66%	4	0.85%
1916	0	0.00%	462	98.30%	8	1.70%
1920	5	1.18%	420	98.82%	0	0.00%
1924	7	1.50%	457	97.65%	4	0.85%
1928	57	7.71%	682	92.29%	0	0.00%
1932	33	4.09%	770	95.53%	3	0.37%
1936	51	6.75%	703	93.11%	1	0.13%
1940	61	7.70%	730	92.17%	1	0.13%
1944	74	9.55%	701	90.45%	0	0.00%
1948	110	12.88%	609	71.31%	135	15.81%
1952	250	16.66%	1,251	83.34%	0	0.00%
1956	268	19.69%	1,093	80.31%	0	0.00%
1960	305	21.65%	1,104	78.35%	0	0.00%
1964	1,196	54.02%	1,018	45.98%	0	0.00%
1968	594	21.66%	972	35.44%	1,177	42.91%
1972	1,963	76.47%	604	23.53%	0	0.00%
1976	835	29.04%	2,040	70.96%	0	0.00%
1980	1,166	36.70%	1,951	61.41%	60	1.89%
1984	1,830	57.80%	1,336	42.20%	0	0.00%
1988	2,111	57.74%	1,532	41.90%	13	0.36%
1992	1,756	37.41%	2,149	45.78%	789	16.81%
1996	2,306	44.81%	2,340	45.47%	500	9.72%
2000	3,596	57.09%	2,612	41.47%	91	1.44%
2004	5,188	63.91%	2,880	35.48%	50	0.62%
2008	5,966	65.28%	3,102	33.94%	71	0.78%
2012	6,215	67.34%	2,926	31.70%	88	0.95%
2016	6,544	68.68%	2,758	28.95%	226	2.37%
2020	8,291	69.92%	3,448	29.08%	118	1.00%
2024	9,136	70.95%	3,696	28.70%	45	0.35%

United States Senate election results for Putnam County, Georgia2
Year	Republican		Democratic		Third party(ies)	
Year	No.	%	No.	%	No.	%
2020	8,279	70.36%	3,299	28.04%	189	1.61%
2020	7,676	70.84%	3,160	29.16%	0	0.00%

United States Senate election results for Putnam County, Georgia3
Year	Republican		Democratic		Third party(ies)	
Year	No.	%	No.	%	No.	%
2020	4,208	35.95%	2,445	20.89%	5,053	43.17%
2020	8,291	70.63%	3,448	29.37%	0	0.00%
2022	7,164	70.22%	2,847	27.91%	191	1.87%
2022	6,594	70.98%	2,696	29.02%	0	0.00%

Georgia Gubernatorial election results for Putnam County
Year	Republican		Democratic		Third party(ies)	
Year	No.	%	No.	%	No.	%
2022	7,689	75.11%	2,497	24.39%	51	0.50%

== See also ==
- National Register of Historic Places listings in Putnam County, Georgia
- Tama-Re
- Rock Eagle Effigy Mound
- Rock Hawk Effigy Mound
- 2017 Georgia prison escape
- List of counties in Georgia
- Putnam County, New York

== Bibliography ==
Notes

References

- McWhirter, Cameron (2011). Red Summer: The Summer of 1919 and the Awakening of Black America. Henry Holt and Company. ISBN 9781429972932. - Total pages: 368
- The Wheeling Intelligencer (May 31, 1919). "Georgia White Burn Five Negro Churches". The Wheeling Intelligencer. Wheeling, West Virginia: Intelligencer Pub. Co. pp. 1–24. OCLC 13502337.
