= Pennington, Georgia =

Unincorporated community in Georgia, U.S.

Coordinates: 33°29′5.45″N 83°33′38.62″W

Pennington is an unincorporated community in Morgan County, in the U.S. state of Georgia.

== History ==
A post office called Pennington was established in 1882, and remained in operation until 1907. J.C. Pennington, an early postmaster, gave the community his last name.
