= Mansfield, Georgia =

- City
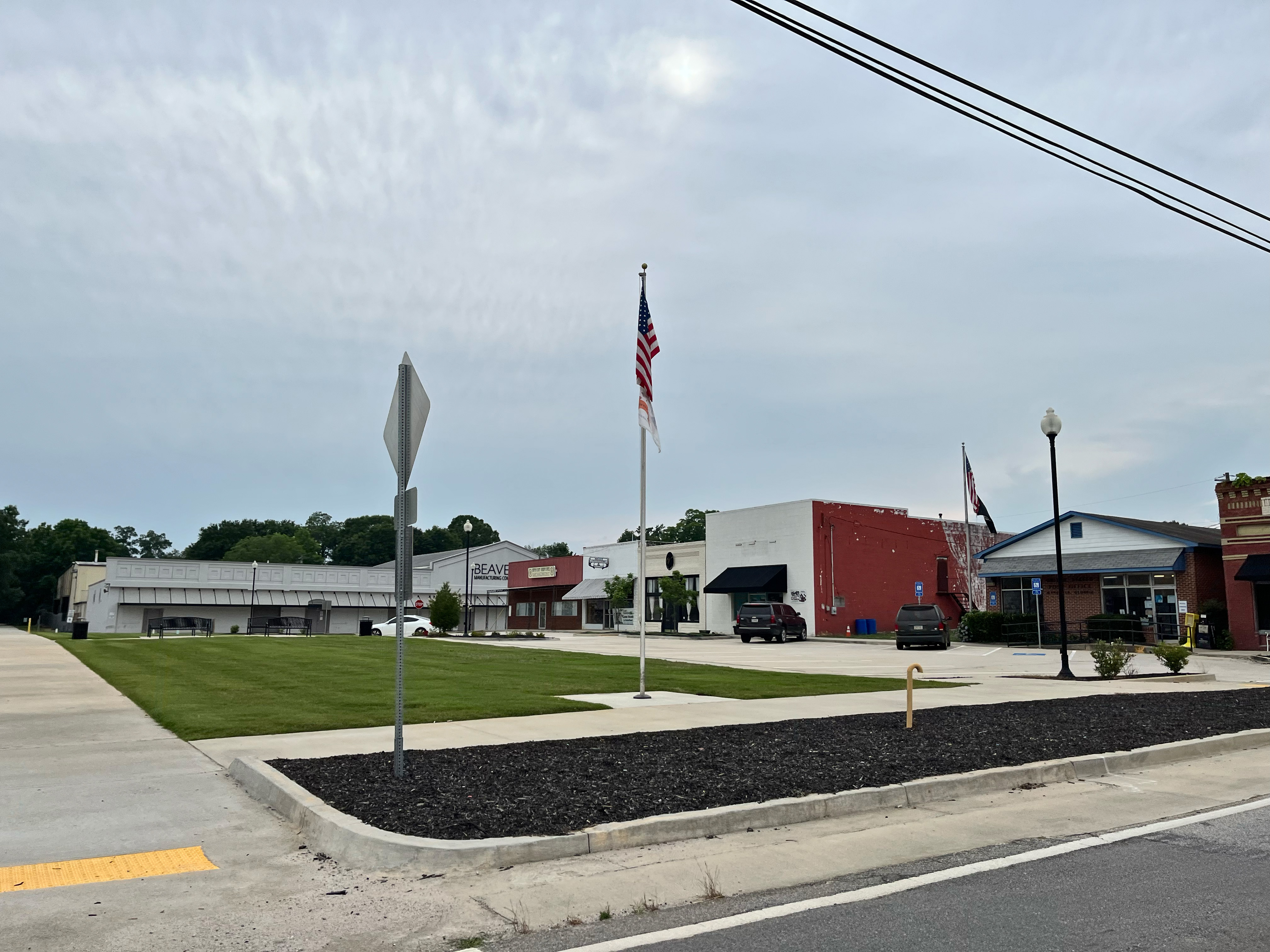
- Mansfield, Georgia

- Location in Newton County and the state of Georgia
- Coordinates: 33°31′7″N 83°44′7″W
- Country: United States
- State: Georgia
- County: Newton

Area
  - Total: 1.10 sq mi (2.84 km^{2})
  - Land: 1.09 sq mi (2.83 km^{2})
  - Water: 0.0039 sq mi (0.01 km^{2})
- Elevation: 761 ft (232 m)

Population (2020)
  - Total: 442
  - Density: 404.5/sq mi (156.17/km^{2})
- Time zone: UTC-5 (Eastern (EST))
  - Summer (DST): UTC-4 (EDT)
- ZIP code: 30055
- FIPS code: 13-49616
- GNIS feature ID: 0317666
- Website: www.mansfieldga.gov

Mansfield is a city in Newton County, Georgia, United States. It is part of Metro Atlanta. As of the 2020 census, this city had a population of 442.

== History ==
Early variant names were "Bob Lee" and "Carmel". A post office called "Mansfield" has been in operation since 1897. The Georgia General Assembly incorporated Mansfield as a town in 1903.

== Geography ==
Mansfield is located at 33°31′07″N 83°44′07″W.

According to the United States Census Bureau, the city has a total area of 1.1 square miles (2.8 km^{2}), of which 1.1 square miles (2.8 km^{2}) is land and 0.93% is water.

== Demographics ==
Historical population
Census	Pop.	Note	%±
1910	589		—
1920	618		4.9%
1930	469		−24.1%
1940	432		−7.9%
1950	446		3.2%
1960	394		−11.7%
1970	340		−13.7%
1980	435		27.9%
1990	341		−21.6%
2000	392		15.0%
2010	410		4.6%
2020	442		7.8%
U.S. Decennial Census

=== Racial and ethnic composition ===
Mansfield city, Georgia – Racial and ethnic composition Note: the US Census treats Hispanic/Latino as an ethnic category. This table excludes Latinos from the racial categories and assigns them to a separate category. Hispanics/Latinos may be of any race.
Race / Ethnicity (NH = Non-Hispanic)	Pop 2000	Pop 2010	Pop 2020	% 2000	% 2010	% 2020
White alone (NH)	306	360	375	78.06%	87.80%	84.84%
Black or African American alone (NH)	83	30	31	21.17%	7.32%	7.01%
Native American or Alaska Native alone (NH)	0	1	0	0.00%	0.24%	0.00%
Asian alone (NH)	0	7	1	0.00%	1.71%	0.23%
Native Hawaiian or Pacific Islander alone (NH)	0	0	1	0.00%	0.00%	0.23%
Other race alone (NH)	0	0	0	0.00%	0.00%	0.00%
Mixed race or Multiracial (NH)	3	5	19	0.77%	1.22%	4.30%
Hispanic or Latino (any race)	0	7	15	0.00%	1.71%	3.39%
Total	392	410	442	100.00%	100.00%	100.00%

=== 2000 census ===
As of the census of 2000, there were 392 people, 132 households, and 105 families residing in the city. By 2020, its population was 442.
