= Newborn, Georgia =

- Town
- Location in Newton County and the state of Georgia
- Coordinates: 33°31′1″N 83°41′40″W
- Country: United States
- State: Georgia
- County: Newton

Area
  - Total: 1.61 sq mi (4.16 km^{2})
  - Land: 1.59 sq mi (4.13 km^{2})
  - Water: 0.012 sq mi (0.03 km^{2})
- Elevation: 732 ft (223 m)

Population (2020)
  - Total: 676
  - Density: 423.9/sq mi (163.65/km^{2})
- Time zone: UTC-5 (Eastern (EST))
  - Summer (DST): UTC-4 (EDT)
- ZIP code: 30056
- Area code: 770
- FIPS code: 13-54656
- GNIS feature ID: 0319570
- Website: http://newbornga.com

Newborn is a town in Newton County, Georgia, United States. The population was 676 in 2020.

== History ==
After hearing a sermon by 19th-century preacher Samuel Porter Jones, the town adopted the name "Newborn", after the concept of born again in Evangelical Christianity. The Georgia General Assembly incorporated Newborn as a town in 1894.

== Geography ==
Newborn is located at 33°31′1″N 83°41′40″W (33.516980, -83.694572).

According to the United States Census Bureau, the town has a total area of 1.6 square miles (4.1 km^{2}), all land.

== Demographics ==
Historical population
Census	Pop.	Note	%±
1890	230		—
1900	345		50.0%
1910	475		37.7%
1920	409		−13.9%
1930	332		−18.8%
1940	307		−7.5%
1950	298		−2.9%
1960	283		−5.0%
1970	269		−4.9%
1980	387		43.9%
1990	404		4.4%
2000	520		28.7%
2010	696		33.8%
2020	676		−2.9%
U.S. Decennial Census

=== Racial and ethnic composition ===
Newborn town, Georgia – Racial and ethnic composition Note: the US Census treats Hispanic/Latino as an ethnic category. This table excludes Latinos from the racial categories and assigns them to a separate category. Hispanics/Latinos may be of any race.
Race / Ethnicity (NH = Non-Hispanic)	Pop 2000	Pop 2010	Pop 2020	% 2000	% 2010	% 2020
White alone (NH)	364	534	503	70.00%	76.72%	74.41%
Black or African American alone (NH)	133	112	121	25.58%	16.09%	17.90%
Native American or Alaska Native alone (NH)	4	9	1	0.77%	1.29%	0.15%
Asian alone (NH)	0	4	4	0.00%	0.57%	0.59%
Native Hawaiian or Pacific Islander alone (NH)	0	0	0	0.00%	0.00%	0.00%
Other race alone (NH)	0	0	1	0.00%	0.00%	0.15%
Mixed race or Multiracial (NH)	4	6	25	0.77%	0.86%	3.70%
Hispanic or Latino (any race)	15	31	21	2.88%	4.45%	3.11%
Total	520	696	676	100.00%	100.00%	100.00%

=== 2000 census ===
As of the census of 2000, there were 520 people, 181 households, and 148 families living in the town. By 2020, its population was 676.
