= Eatonton, Georgia =

Eatonton
- City
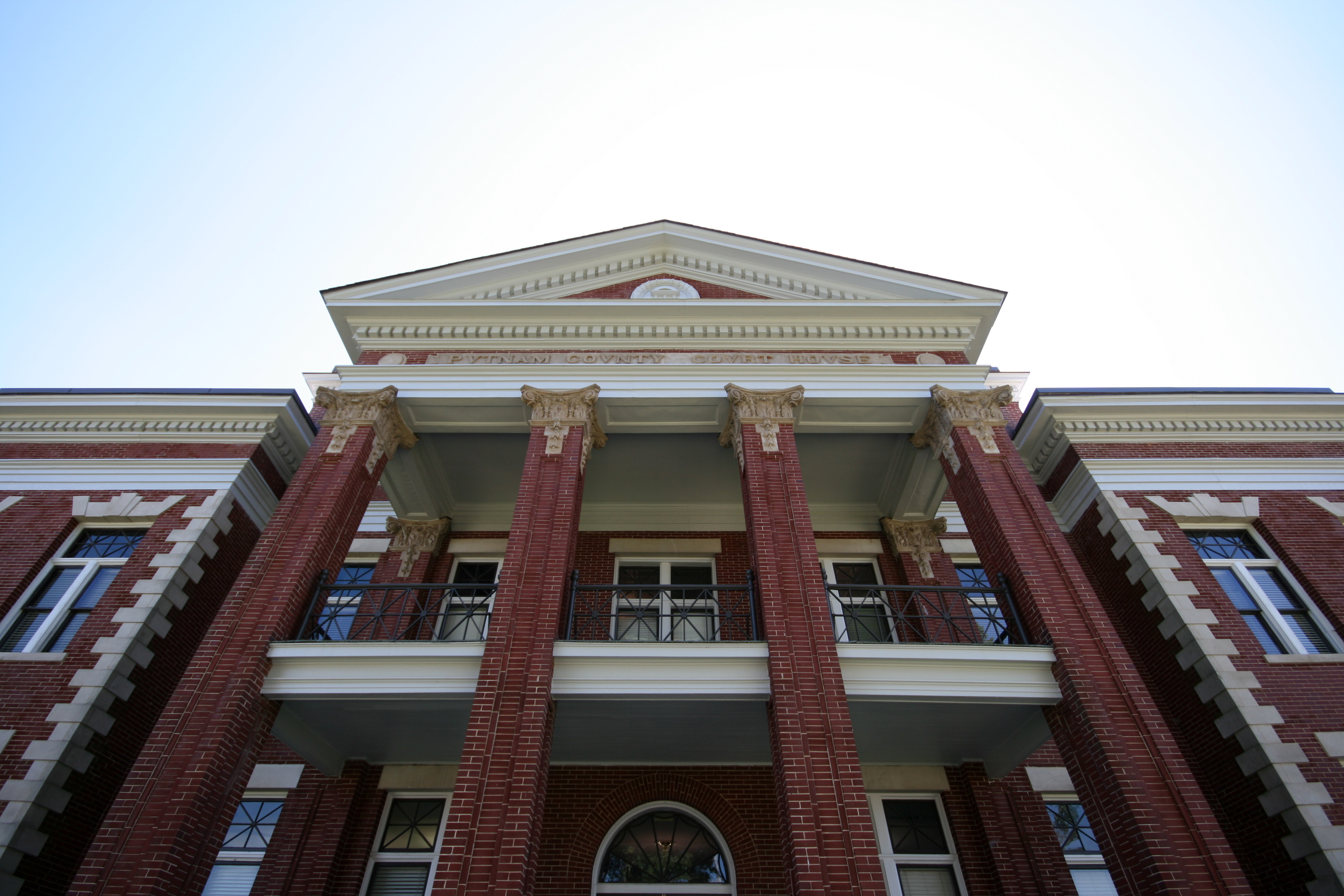
- Putnam County Courthouse in Eatonton

- Flag Seal

- Location in Putnam County and the state of Georgia

- Location within Georgia Location within the United States
- Coordinates: 33°19′35″N 83°23′16″W
- Country: United States
- State: Georgia
- County: Putnam

Area
  - Total: 20.61 sq mi (53.38 km^{2})
  - Land: 20.51 sq mi (53.12 km^{2})
  - Water: 0.10 sq mi (0.27 km^{2})
- Elevation: 568 ft (173 m)

Population (2020)
  - Total: 6,307
  - Density: 307.5/sq mi (118.74/km^{2})
- Time zone: UTC-5 (Eastern (EST))
  - Summer (DST): UTC-4 (EDT)
- ZIP codes: 31024
- Area code: 706
- FIPS code: 13-26084
- GNIS feature ID: 0331628
- Website: City of Eatonton

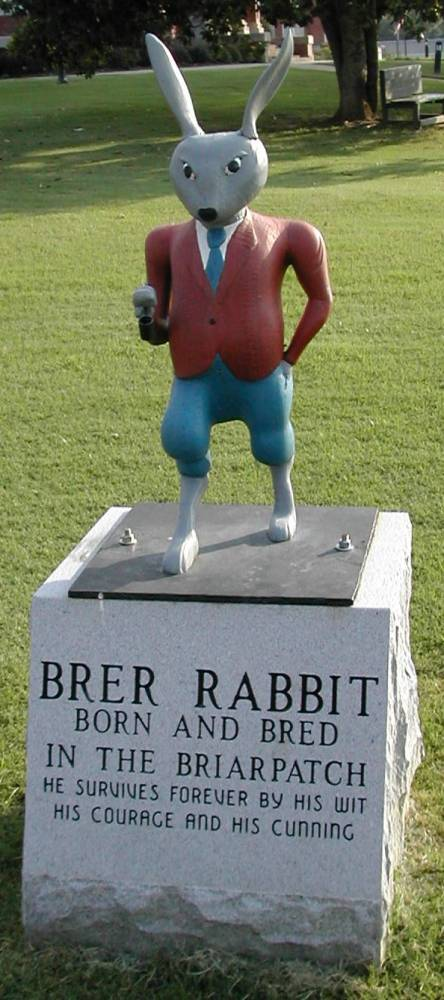
Eatonton's statue of Br'er Rabbit

Eatonton is a city in and the county seat of Putnam County, Georgia, United States. As of the 2020 census, the city had a population of 6,307. It was named after William Eaton, an officer and diplomat involved in the First Barbary War. The name consists of his surname with the English suffix "ton", meaning "town".

== History ==
Early Years

The first historically recognized society in Eatonton was a Creek Indian town, Cusseta, in 1790. During, this period, the chief of the Cusseta was Birdtail. In 1790, he signed the Treaty of New York on behalf of his people. The treaty aimed to establish peace and foster friendly relations between the Creek Nation and the United States.

Following the American Revolutionary War, Eatonton was founded in 1807 as the seat of newly formed Putnam County. After the war, settlers were moving west and settling in the upland Piedmont region to develop cotton plantations. Eatonton was incorporated as a town in 1809 and as a city in 1879.

Dairy Capital

In the 21st century, Eatonton is known as the "Dairy Capital of Georgia" (in honor of its major industry, dairy farming).

After the Civil War in 1864, Putnam County faced significant economic hardship as the wealth of its once thriving plantations declined or disappeared entirely. Throughout the 19th century, Putnam sought ways to rebuild its economy. In 1876, a former New York banker named Benjamin Hunt had relocated in Putnam and brought fifteen dairy cows establishing Panola Farm. Panola Farm was an experimental dairy facility that became a cornerstone in the development of Eatonton's dairy industry, helping to reshape Putnam agricultural future. By 1901 Putnam was the third leading dairy county in Georgia, shipping cream to Athens and butter to Atlanta.

By 1909, The Eatonton Co-Operative Creamery was founded. Local farmers came together and produced various dairy products like milk, cream, butter etc. In 1946 Eatonton Co-Operative Creamery sold $1,406,000 worth of dairy products (over $23 million in 2025 dollars).

In addition to the dairy industry flourishing the city of Eatonton holds a festival celebrating local dairy farmers called The Dairy Festival. The first Dairy Festival was held in 1953. For more than seventy years, Eatonton continues to celebrate its dairy heritage with an annual Dairy Festival Parade, held during the first weekend of June.

Rock Eagle

The Rock Eagle Effigy Mound, a Native American archaeological site, is located north of the city. It is one of two such sites east of the Mississippi River; both are in Putnam County. The mound and related earthwork constructions were made by Woodland culture peoples, perhaps as long ago as 1,000 to 3,000 years. The site is situated within a 1500-acre park administered by the University of Georgia, which also maintains a 4-H camp nearby. The Mound has been listed on the National Register of Historic Places. The purpose of Rock Eagle was to provide recreation and education for children involved in the 4-H Clubs throughout Georgia.

In a 5-hour period in May 1919, five black churches and two black lodges in Eatonton were burned to the ground, but authorities did not charge anyone with arson.

On November 22, 1992, an F4 tornado with winds up to 260 mph hit the south portions of the city. The storm caused $27,000,000 in damages to houses and businesses. The tornado killed five locals and injured 86.

Briarpatch Farms

Briarpatch Farms was a farm community that consisted of farmers who farmed cotton, dairy, and timber. Originally the farm community was called Chancellorsville homestead, Inc. However FSA (Farm Service Agency) renamed the farmland to Briarpatch Farm Project. Located north eastern portion of Putnam, sat on 12,000 acres of land. Briarpatch residents were given a homestead which included land, a home, farm buildings, and government stock. Each family had running water and electricity. In order for a farmer to become a settler in Briarpatch they had to be "thrifty, honest, have civic pride, and furnish three references from local citizens' February 7th, 1935 the first couple of families moved into their homes. By June 1935 fifty more families moved in. By this time Briarpatch had their own workshop, cannery, poultry house, and other buildings in business. They would celebrate holidays together such as the 4th of July. Over the years the Briarpatch community had created their own baseball team and a small library. In December 1935 ten more houses were built on Briarpatch. Between 1936-1937 The Briarpatch community had evolved, they had created a Woman's Club, Briarpatch Farmer's Organization, Girls Cooking and Sewing Club, and a non- denominational Sunday school.

== Geography ==
Eatonton is located at 33°19′35″N 83°23′16″W (33.326302, -83.387798).

The city is located in the central part of the state along U.S. Routes 129 and 441, which meet in and form the western boundary of the city. Via U.S. 129/441, Madison is 22 mi (35 km) north. After leaving the city southward, U.S. 129 runs southwest 25 mi (40 km) to Gray and U.S. 441 runs southeast 21 mi (34 km) to Milledgeville. Georgia State Routes 16 and 44 are the main roads through the center of town, with GA-16 leading east 27 mi (43 km) to Sparta and west 18 mi (29 km) to Monticello, and GA-44 leading northeast 23 mi (37 km) to Greensboro.

According to the United States Census Bureau, the city has a total area of 20.7 square miles (54 km^{2}), of which 20.6 square miles (53 km^{2}) is land and 0.1 square miles (0.26 km^{2}) (0.63%) is water.

== Demographics ==
Historical population
Census	Pop.	Note	%±
1840	516		—
1860	2,009		—
1870	1,240		−38.3%
1880	1,371		10.6%
1890	1,682		22.7%
1900	1,823		8.4%
1910	2,036		11.7%
1920	2,519		23.7%
1930	1,876		−25.5%
1940	2,399		27.9%
1950	2,749		14.6%
1960	3,612		31.4%
1970	4,125		14.2%
1980	4,833		17.2%
1990	4,737		−2.0%
2000	6,764		42.8%
2010	6,480		−4.2%
2020	6,307		−2.7%
U.S. Decennial Census; 1850-1870 1870-1880; 1890-1910 1920-1930; 1940 1950 1960; 1970 1980 1990; 2000 2010

=== 2020 census ===
As of the 2020 census, Eatonton had a population of 6,307. The median age was 39.1 years. 24.6% of residents were under the age of 18 and 17.6% of residents were 65 years of age or older. For every 100 females there were 83.0 males, and for every 100 females age 18 and over there were 79.4 males age 18 and over.

0.0% of residents lived in urban areas, while 100.0% lived in rural areas.

There were 2,453 households in Eatonton, including 1,756 family households, of which 34.9% had children under the age of 18 living in them. Of all households, 31.6% were married-couple households, 19.8% were households with a male householder and no spouse or partner present, and 43.1% were households with a female householder and no spouse or partner present. About 30.7% of all households were made up of individuals, and 14.4% had someone living alone who was 65 years of age or older.

There were 2,796 housing units, of which 12.3% were vacant. The homeowner vacancy rate was 1.1% and the rental vacancy rate was 5.6%.

Eatonton racial composition as of 2020
Race	Num.	Perc.
White (non-Hispanic)	1,976	31.33%
Black or African American (non-Hispanic)	3,553	56.33%
Native American	10	0.16%
Asian	26	0.41%
Other/Mixed	158	2.51%
Hispanic or Latino	584	9.26%

== Education ==
=== Schools in the area ===
Education in late 1890s

In 1893, United States statistics showed that during that time only 31% of all children between the ages of sixteen and eighteen attended school. In Putnam county, only 12% of children attended school. Eatonton Academy at the time was a free public school. Eatonton Academy was built in 1895. Their curriculum consisted of music, art, elocution, and physical culture. Putnam public school system consisted of 14 white schools and 24 colored schools. At the time, the county only operated on a six-month term that began in January. In 1893, there were 1,097 white students who attended school and 3,800 colored students who attended school.

Education in the 1900s

The Georgia Compulsory school Law of 1916 required children ages eight through fourteen to attend school twelve weeks out of the year. During that year, Eatonton High School was built which is now known as The Plaza Arts Center. Eatonton High School closed in 2001 and went under renovation, and reopened to the public in March 2008.

Late summer in 1937, government officials had contracted to build a new school called New Phoenix School on Briarpatch Farms. The cost to build the school was $2,500.

In 1956 Putnam opened Butler-Baker High School. It was a school for African American students. It served students from first grade through twelfth grade. By 1969 school segregation ended in Eatonton, Georgia causing for both colored and white schools to integrate.

In 1968, Putnam County High School in Eatonton, Georgia opened in 1968; however, in the early 2010s, a brand new Putnam County High School was built.

In the fall of 1992, Putnam County Elementary School opened.

Currently, Putnam County School District holds grades Headstart to grade twelve, and consists of one primary school, an elementary school, a middle school, a high school, and an alternative school. The district has 165 full-time teachers and more than 2,474 students. Gatewood Schools, a private Christian school in the area, serves children in grades K3-12.

- Gatewood Schools (K3-12)
- Putnam County Primary School
- Putnam County Elementary School
- Putnam County Middle School
- Putnam County High School
- Putnam County Achievement Academy

== Notable people ==
Vincent Hancock, Olympic gold medalist in men's skeet shooting at the 2008, 2012, and 2020 Summer Olympics and Gatewood Schools graduate, resides in Eatonton.

The city is the birthplace of noted writers: Joel Chandler Harris, journalist and author of the Uncle Remus stories, 19th century poet Louise Prudden Hunt (Mrs. B. W. Hunt), Henry Grady Weaver, author of The Mainspring of Human Progress, and Alice Walker, author of the novel The Color Purple and other fiction.

Artist and leading scholar, curator, and promoter of African American art David Driskell was a native of Eatonton.

S. Truett Cathy, founder of Chick-fil-A fast food restaurant and franchise, is a native of the town.

Thomas Adiel Sherwood, Justice of the Missouri Supreme Court from 1873 to 1902, was born there.
