= Interstate 20 in Georgia =

Interstate Highway in Georgia

Interstate 20
- I-20 highlighted in red

Route information
- Maintained by GDOT
- Length: 202.61 mi (326.07 km)
- Existed: 1963–present
- NHS: Entire route

Major junctions
- West end: I-20 at the Alabama state line southwest of Tallapoosa
- US 27 / SR 1 in Bremen; I-285 in Atlanta; I-75 / I-85 in Atlanta; US 23 / SR 42 in Atlanta; I-285 on the Panthersville–Candler-McAfee line; US 278 / SR 12 from southeast of Lithonia to Covington; US 129 / US 441 / SR 24 in Madison; US 278 / SR 12 northwest of Norwood; US 221 / SR 47 north of Harlem; I-520 / SR 232 in Augusta
- East end: I-20 at the South Carolina state line in Augusta

Location
- Country: United States
- State: Georgia
- Counties: Haralson, Carroll, Douglas, Cobb, Fulton, DeKalb, Rockdale, Newton, Walton, Morgan, Greene, Taliaferro, Warren, McDuffie, Columbia, Richmond

Highway system
- Interstate Highway System; Main; Auxiliary; Suffixed; Business; Future; Georgia State Highway System; Interstate; US; State; Special
| ← SR 19 | → SR 20 |
| ← SR 401 | SR 402 | → SR 403 |

Interstate 20 (I-20) is a part of the Interstate Highway System that spans 1,539.38 miles (2,477.39 km) from Reeves County, Texas, to Florence, South Carolina. In the US state of Georgia, I-20 travels from the Alabama state line to the Savannah River, which is the South Carolina state line. The highway enters the state near Tallapoosa. It travels through the Atlanta metropolitan area and exits the state in Augusta. The highway also travels through the cities of Bremen, Douglasville, Conyers, Covington, and Madison. I-20 has the unsigned state highway designation State Route 402 (SR 402).

== Route description ==
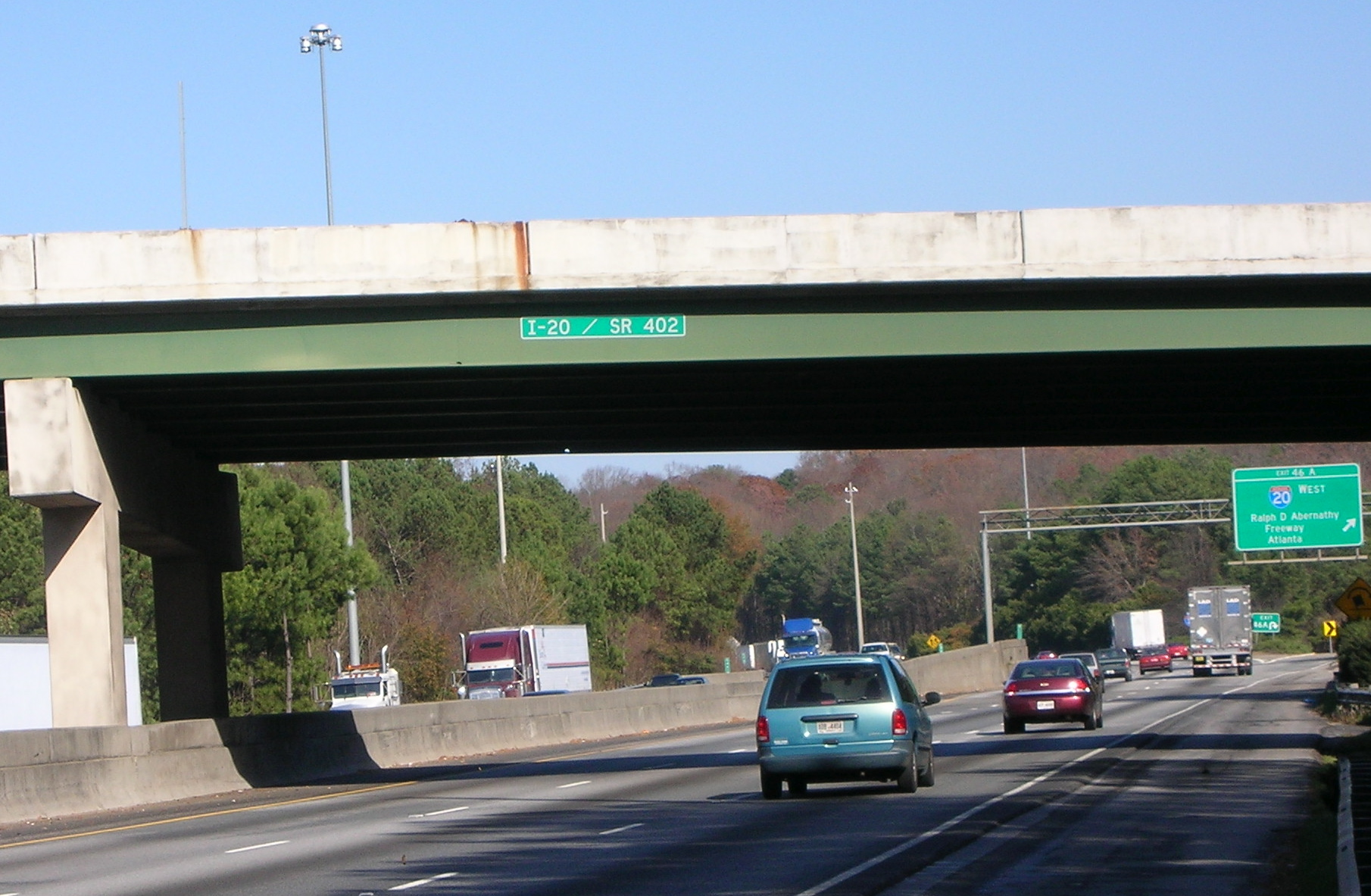
Although the designation does not appear on shields, Georgia DOT refers to the highway as SR 402

I-20 is the main east–west Interstate in Georgia. It is four lanes wide in much of the state. In the Atlanta metropolitan area, the highway ranges from six lanes wide in the most outlying counties to 10 lanes wide in downtown Atlanta. As with all Interstate Highways, all of I-20 in Georgia is included as part of the National Highway System, a system of routes determined to be important for the nation's economy, mobility, and defense.

=== Haralson and Carroll counties ===
I-20 enters Georgia from Alabama south-southwest of Tallapoosa. The state line is the Central–Eastern time zone boundary. It travels to the east-northeast and crosses over Williams Creek. It passes the Georgia Visitor Information Center. The highway crosses over Walton Creek just before briefly entering the city limits of Tallapoosa. Immediately after it leaves the city limits, it has an interchange with SR 100. Within the interchange, I-20 enters the city limits of Tallapoosa twice more. After crossing over Blalock Creek, it curves to the east. After it curves back to the east-northeast, it crosses over Walker Creek twice. It curves to the east-southeast and travels along the southern edge of Waco, where it has an interchange with Waco Road. The Interstate then enters Bremen. Almost immediately, it then enters Carroll County.

I-20 curves to the east and has an interchange with US 27/SR 1. It leaves Bremen and travels southeast of the city. It curves back to the east-northeast and crosses over Buck Creek. Right after the creek, the westbound lanes have a weigh station. The highway travels south of Spence Lake. It curves to the northeast and crosses over Allen Creek. It enters the city limits of Temple and crosses over Bethel Creek. After a crossing of Webster Creek, the highway curves to the east-northeast and has an interchange with SR 113 (Carrollton Street). It curves to the east-southeast and leaves Temple. It crosses the Little Tallapoosa River and then curves back to the east-northeast. It curves to the east and enters Villa Rica. It travels just south of Villa Rica High School. Immediately, it has an interchange with SR 61/SR 101. It curves to the east-northeast and passes the Glanton–Hindsman Elementary School. It then enters Douglas County.

=== Douglas and Cobb counties ===
After I-20 starts curving to the east-southeast, it has an interchange with Liberty Road. It leaves the city limits of Villa Rica and curves to the east. It crosses over Keaton Creek. It curves back to the east-southeast and has an interchange with Post Road southwest of Winston. It curves to the east-northeast and crosses over Mobley Creek. It enters Douglasville. It has an interchange with SR 5 (Bill Arp Road). It then passes the Arbor Place Mall on its northern side. It crosses over Anneewakee Creek and then has an interchange with Chapel Hill Road. The highway curves to the northeast and passes the WellStar Douglas Hospital on its eastern side. After crossing over Slater Mill Creek, it has an interchange with SR 92 (Fairburn Road). Within the interchange, I-20 crosses over Little Anneewakee Creek. It then travels along the Lithia Springs–Douglasville city line before briefly reentering Douglasville proper. It then very briefly travels along the Lithia Springs–Dawsonville city line. There, it has an interchange with Lee Road and crosses over Beaver Creek. Immediately after the interchange begins, the Interstate enters Lithia Springs proper. It briefly leaves the city limits of Lithia Springs and crosses over Sweetwater Creek on the Blair Bridge. Upon reentering the city, it curves to the east-southeast and has an interchange with SR 6 (Thornton Road). Right after leaving the interchange, it leaves Lithia Springs again and enters Cobb County. I-20 then has an interchange with Riverside Parkway. Almost immediately is a partial interchange with Six Flags Parkway. This interchange is only accessible from the westbound lanes. At this interchange, the highway begins to travel along the southern edge of Mableton. It then crosses over the Chattahoochee River on the Debra Mills Commemorative Bridge. This marks the eastern end of Mableton, as well as the Fulton County line.

=== Fulton County ===
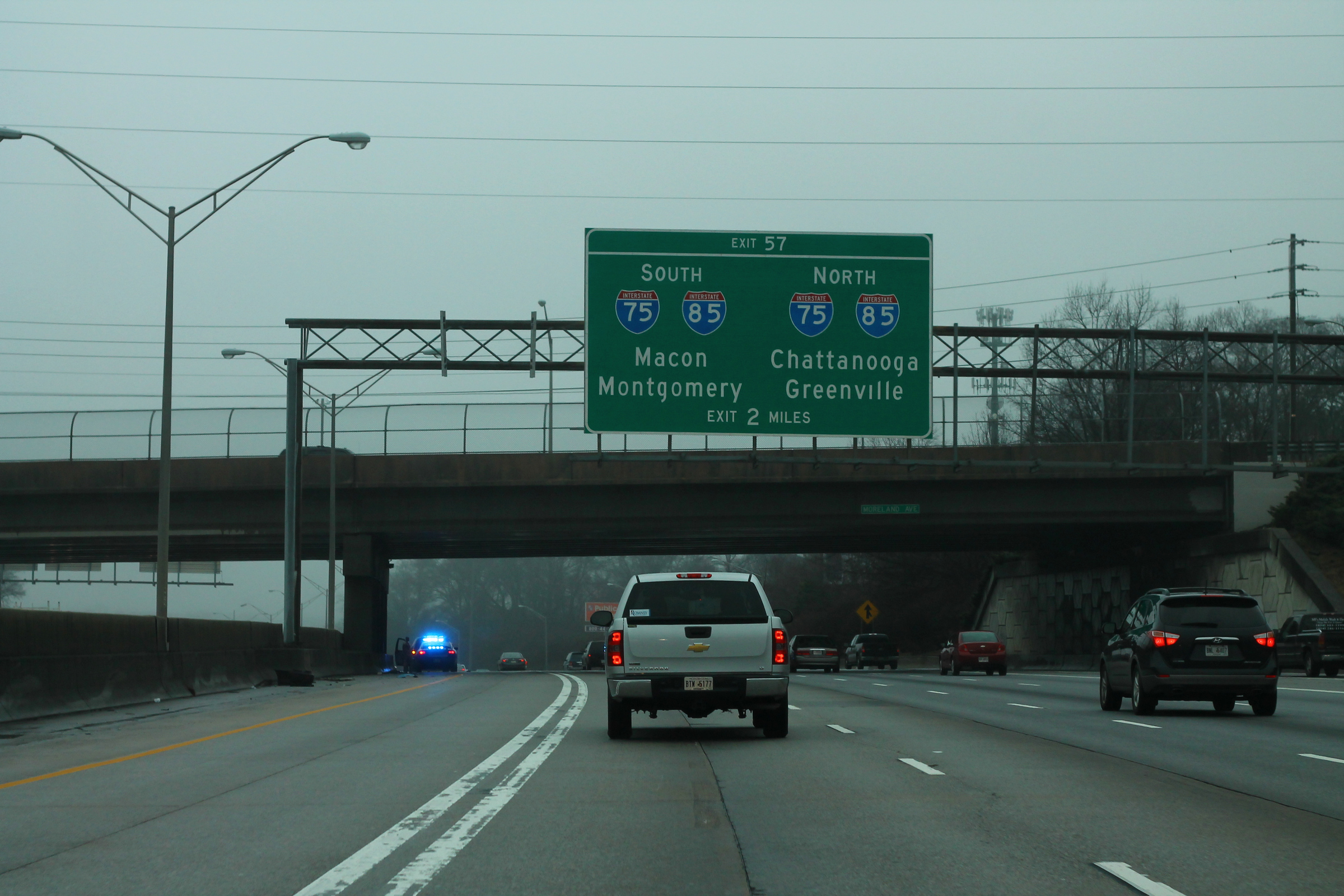
I-20 approaching the Downtown Connector (I-75/85)

I-20 then has an interchange with SR 70 (Fulton Industrial Boulevard). It curves to the east-northeast and finally enters Atlanta proper on the Adamsville–Old Gordon neighborhood line in the western part of the city. At a bridge over SR 139, the highway begins traveling along the Adamsville–Fairburn Heights neighborhood line. After passing Collier Heights Park, it curves to the southeast and has an interchange with I-285 (Atlanta Bypass). This interchange is just south of the Basoline E. Usher Elementary School and on the southwestern edge of Harwell Heights Park. Right after the I-285 interchange, the highway briefly travels on the Westhaven–Collier Heights neighborhood line. It crosses over Sandy Creek and then has an interchange with SR 280 (Holmes Drive). At this interchange, it begins to briefly travel on the Westhaven–Dixie Hills neighborhood line. Just southeast of this interchange, it travels along the Florida Heights–Dixie Hills neighborhood line. At a crossing of Fairfield Place NW, I-20 begins to parallel SR 139. Just north of Westview Cemetery, it travels along the southern edge of the Penelope Neighbors neighborhood. The highway curves to the east-northeast and has an interchange with Martin Luther King Jr. Drive. It immediately curves back to the southeast and begins to travel along the southern edge of the Mozley Park neighborhood. Upon traveling under a bridge that carries Westview Drive SW, it begins traveling along the Westview–Mozley Park neighborhood line. Upon reaching a partial interchange with Langhorn Street SW, which is only accessible from the westbound lanes, it enters the West End neighborhood. Upon crossing over Lawton Street SW, it begins to briefly travel on the West End–Harris Chiles neighborhood line. The Interstate curves to the east-southeast and has an interchange with Lowery Boulevard. It passes The Mall West End at a partial interchange with Lee Street, which is only accessible from the westbound lanes. At this interchange, I-20 begins to very briefly travel along the West End–Atlanta University Center neighborhood line. Upon crossing over US 29/SR 14/SR 154, it briefly travels through the Adair Park neighborhood. Upon crossing over US 19/US 41/SR 3, the highway slips through the northern part of the Pittsburgh neighborhood. It curves to the northeast and—almost immediately—enters the Mechanicsville neighborhood. It has an interchange with McDaniel Street SW that leads to US 19/US 29. At this interchange, it begins to travel along the Mechanicsville–Castleberry Hill neighborhood line. At an interchange with Windsor and Spring streets, it begins traveling along the Mechanicsville–Downtown line. I-20 then has an interchange with I-75/I-85 (Downtown Connector). HOV lanes begins on I-20 at the east side of the interchange. Also at the east side of the interchange, it begins to travel along the Summerhill–Capitol Gateway neighborhood line. It briefly travels on the Grant Park–Capitol Gateway neighborhood line before entering Grant Park proper. It has a partial interchange with Capitol Avenue, which is only accessible from the westbound lanes. Right after that is a partial interchange with Hill Street, which is also only accessible from the westbound lanes. It then has an interchange with Boulevard. It very briefly travels along the Grant Park–Reynoldstown neighborhood line. Then, it travels along the Glenwood Park–Reynoldstown neighborhood line. There, it has a partial interchange that leads to Memorial Drive and Glenwood Avenue. This interchange feeds into Bill Kennedy Way SE. Then, it briefly travels along the North Ormewood Park–Reynoldstown neighborhood line. It has an interchange with US 23/SR 42 (Moreland Avenue). At this interchange, the highway enters DeKalb County.

=== DeKalb County ===
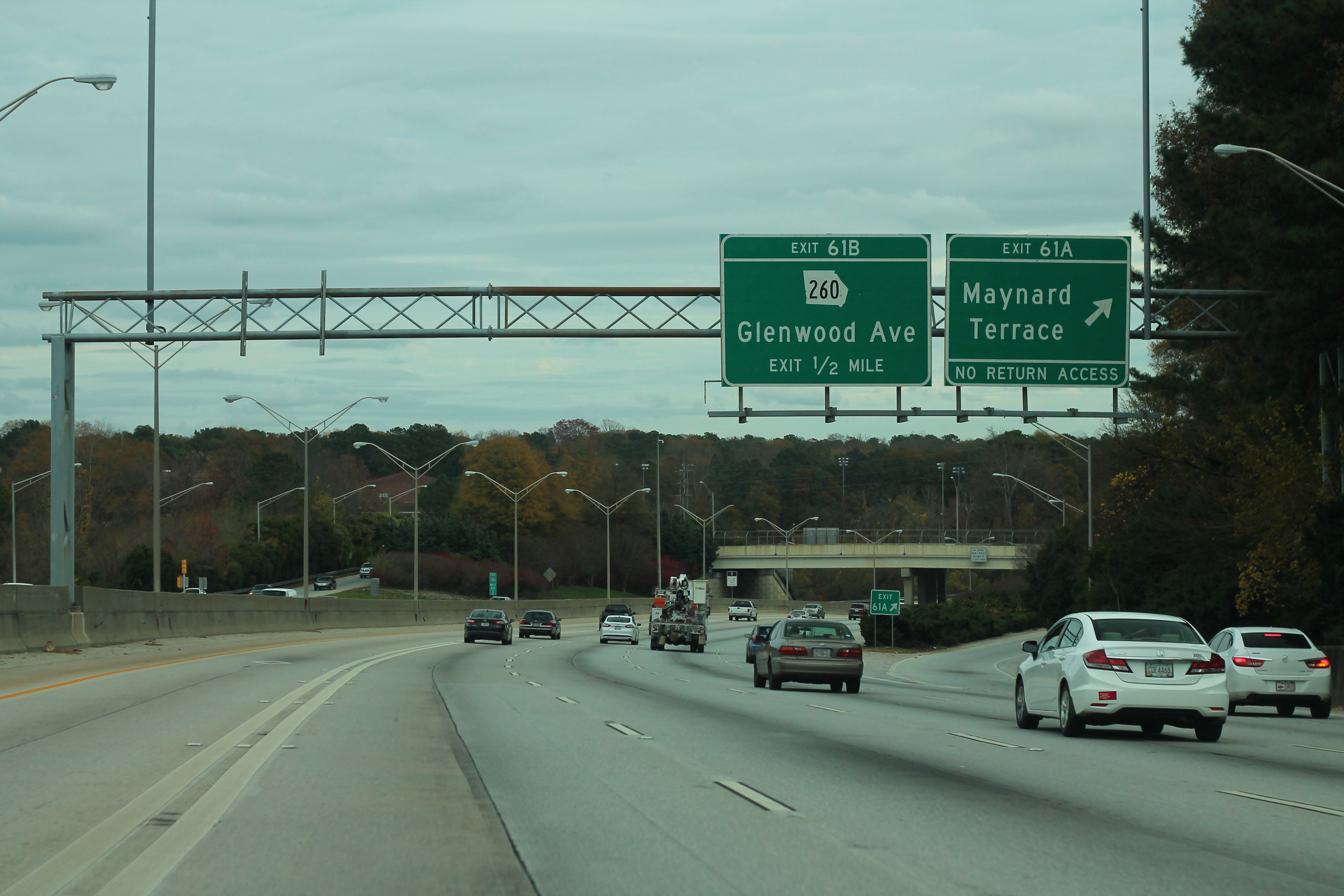
I-20 passing through DeKalb County within the beltway

I-20 enters the eastern part of the city of Atlanta. It begins to travel on the East Atlanta–Edgewood neighborhood line. Just before a partial interchange with Maynard Terrace, which is only accessible from the eastbound lanes, the highway begins to travel along the East Atlanta–Kirkwood neighborhood line and begins to parallel Sugar Creek. It curves to the southeast and has an interchange with SR 260 (Glenwood Avenue). At this interchange, the highway temporarily leaves the city limits of Atlanta. It curves to the south-southwest, veering away from Sugar Creek. It briefly reenters the East Atlanta neighborhood of Atlanta. Here, it has a partial interchange with Flat Shoals Road, which is only accessible from the eastbound lanes, travels under a bridge carrying Fayetteville Road, and begins to curve back to the southeast. It then travels along the northern edge of Gresham Park. It crosses over Sugar Creek and has an interchange with Gresham Road and Flat Shoals Road. Within this interchange, it curves to a due east direction. On the east side of the interchange, it begins to travel along the Panthersville–Candler-McAfee line. It passes McNair Middle School to the south and then curves to the east-northeast. It has an interchange with SR 155 (Candler Road). It travels just to the south of Misty Waters Park. It begins to curve to the east-southeast and has a partial interchange with Columbia Drive, which is only accessible from the eastbound lanes. Almost immediately is a second interchange with I-285 (Atlanta Bypass), where the HOV lanes end at. At the east end of the interchange is a side access road, which leads to an interchange with Wesley Chapel and Snapfinger roads, and a crossing of Cobbs Creek and Fowler Branch. The Interstate travels under a bridge carrying Wesley Chapel Road and curves to the southeast. It crosses over Snapfinger Creek and begins to curve to the east-northeast. At the curve, it travels just to the south of Walden Lake. It crosses over Panthers Branch and then has an interchange with Panola Road. It then passes Emory Hillandale Hospital on its south side. It then passes Hillandale Memorial Gardens just before an interchange with Evans Mill Road and Lithonia Industrial Boulevard. Within this interchange, the highway curves to the east-southeast and crosses over Pole Bridge Creek. It then crosses over Honey Creek just before passing the Mall at Stonecrest just to its north. Just to the northeast of the mall, I-20 has an interchange with US 278/SR 12 and the western terminus of SR 124. At this interchange, SR 124 ends, and US 278/SR 12 begins a concurrency with I-20. The three highways curve to the southeast and enter Rockdale County.

=== Rockdale and Newton counties ===
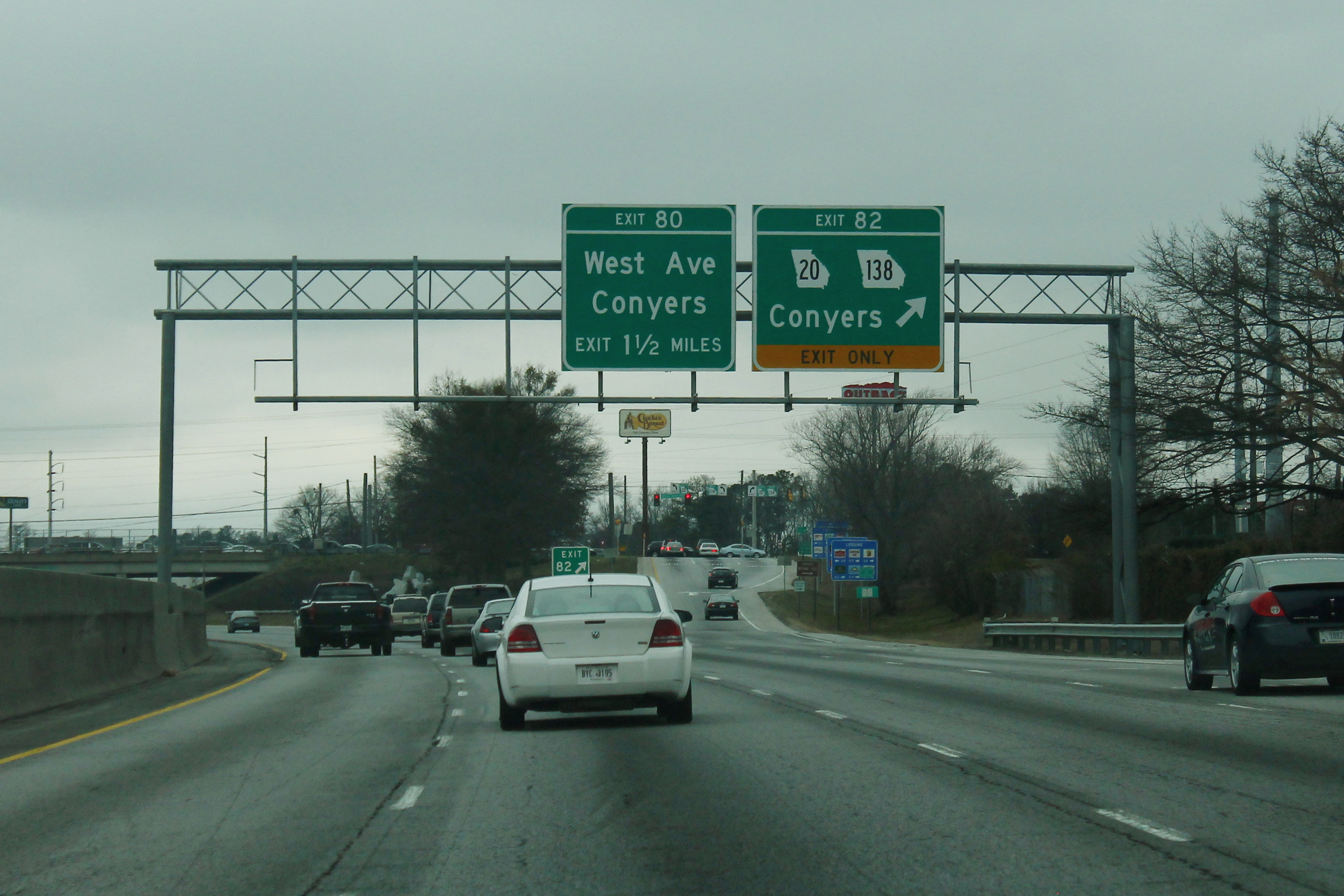
Interstate 20 west at Conyers

I-20/US 278/SR 12 has an interchange with Sigman Road. The three highways cross over Almand Creek and then enter the city limits of Conyers. They have an interchange with West Avenue. Within this interchange, they cross over Tanyard Branch. They pass the Rockdale Tennis Center just to its north and then have an interchange with SR 20/SR 138. They cross over Snapping Shoals Creek and then have an interchange with SR 162 (Salem Road). At this interchange, they leave the city limits of Conyers. After curving to the east-southeast, they enter Newton County. I-20/US 278/SR 12 curves back to the southeast. Just after beginning to curve back to the east-southeast, the three highways meet Almon Road on the southeastern edge of Almon. They cross over the Yellow River and then curve to the southeast. They pass Lawnwood Memorial Park to its north and then enter the city limits of Covington. At the first interchange in the city, US 278/SR 12 leaves I-20, and the Interstate begins to curve to the northeast. It travels on a bridge over Old Atlanta Highway and some railroad tracks of CSX. After traveling under a bridge that carries SR 81, it very briefly cuts across the extreme southeastern corner of Oxford and then re-enters Covington. It crosses over Dried Indian Creek and curves to a nearly due east direction. It has an interchange with Alcovy Road. Just after this interchange, it temporarily leaves the city limits of Covington again and curves to the east-southeast. After an interchange with SR 142 (Hazelbrand Road), it reenters Covington. It crosses over the Alcovy River before leaving Covington for its third and final time. The highway curves to the east-northeast and then has an interchange with SR 11. It curves to the east-southeast and crosses over Nelson Creek. Right after crossing over the Little River, it has another interchange with US 278/SR 12. At this interchange, it enters Walton County.

=== Walton, Morgan and Greene counties ===
I-20 immediately begins traveling along the southern edge of Social Circle. The highway has a crossing of Dennis Creek and then leaves Social Circle and enters Morgan County. I-20's eastbound lanes have a rest area. Then, the highway crosses over Hunnicut Creek. It curves to the southeast and has an interchange with Newborn Road. After the westbound lanes have a rest area, the highway curves to the east-northeast. It crosses over Big Indian Creek and then curves to the southeast. It enters the city limits of Madison. The highway crosses over Little Indian Creek just before an interchange with SR 83 (Monticello Road). It travels on a bridge over Fourmile Branch and some railroad tracks of Norfolk Southern Railway. It curves to a nearly due east direction and has an interchange with US 129/US 441/SR 24 (Eatonton Road). I-20 leaves the city limits of Madison and crosses over the South Sugar Creek. After a crossing of North Sugar Creek, it curves to a southeasterly direction and has an interchange with Seven Island Road. It travels just south of the Chattahoochee–Oconee National Forest and curves to the east-northeast. A crossing of Lake Oconee marks the Greene County line.

I-20 crosses over Richland Creek and then has an interchange with SR 44. It briefly travels through the southwestern part of Greensboro. Just after traveling under a bridge that carries Veazey Road, the highway travels along the southeastern edge of Greensboro. The highway crosses over Beaverdam Creek and curves to the east-southeast. It has crossings of Oliver Creek, Bowden Creek, and SR 15, before entering Siloam. There, it has an interchange with SR 77, which drivers can take to get to SR 15. The highway curves to the northeast and leaves the city limits of Siloam. It curves back to the east-southeast and crosses over the South Fork Ogeechee River. It then enters Taliaferro County.

=== Taliaferro, Warren, and McDuffie counties ===
This is where the Augusta metro area starts. I-20 begins to parallel Beaverdam Creek. It curves to the east-northeast and crosses over the creek. It curves to the east-southeast and crosses over the North Fork Ogeechee River before an interchange with SR 22. It crosses over Mile Branch. The highway curves to the southeast and then enters Warren County. Almost immediately, I-20 crosses over Red Lick Creek. It curves to the east-northeast and has another interchange with US 278/SR 12 (Atlanta Highway). It begins to parallel Williams Creek before crossing over it. It begins to curve to the southeast before it has an interchange with Cadley Road. After crossing over Hart Creek, the highway curves to the east-northeast. It crosses over Middle Creek and then crosses over some railroad tracks of CSX before an interchange with SR 80 (Washington Highway). It crosses over Childers Creek just before entering McDuffie County.

After an interchange with Three Points Road that directs drivers to Thomson, I-20 crosses over Mattox Creek. It then has an interchange with SR 17 (Washington Road). At the east end of this interchange, it travels under a bridge that carries US 78/SR 10/SR 17 Bypass (Thomson Bypass). It crosses over Little Germany Creek before curving to the east-southeast. It crosses over Germany Creek on the southern edge of Upper Folly Lake. Almost immediately is an interchange with SR 150 (Cobbham Road). It crosses over Greenbrier Creek just before entering Columbia County.

=== Columbia and Richmond counties ===
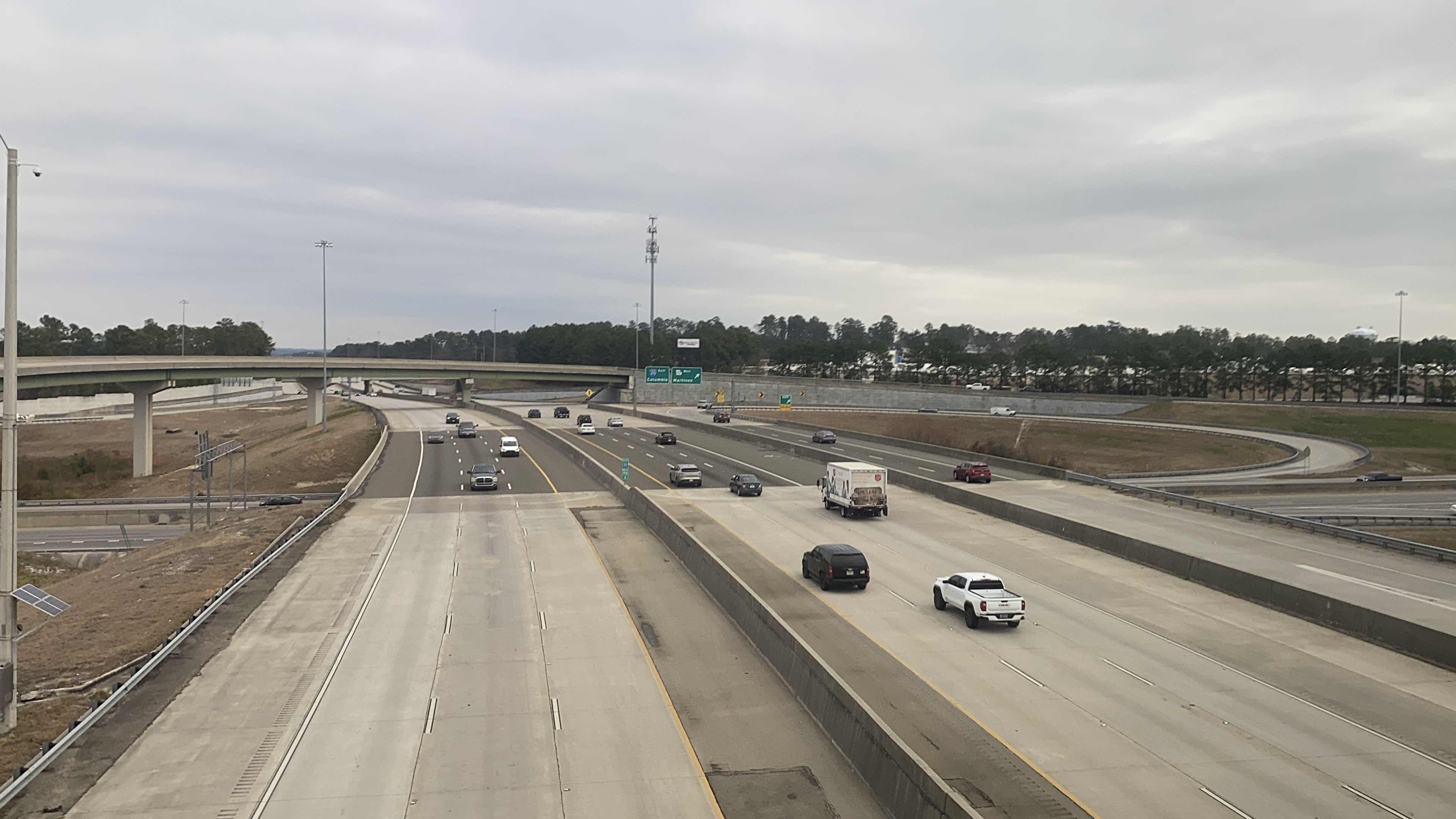
I-20 at I-520 junction, facing eastbound, located in Augusta

I-20 crosses over Kiokee Creek before the eastbound lanes have a rest area. Right after crossing over Hawes Branch, the westbound lanes have a rest area. The highway then has an interchange with US 221/SR 47 (Appling–Harlem Road). It then crosses over Little Kiokee Creek. First, the eastbound lanes and then, the westbound lanes have a weigh station just to the south of Baker Place Elementary School, Columbia Middle School, and Grovetown High School. It crosses over Euchee Creek and Mill Branch before an interchange with SR 388 (Horizon South Parkway/Lewiston Road). This interchange is the main access point for Grovetown. Almost immediately, it crosses over Tudor Branch. After crossing over Walton Branch, the Interstate begins to travel along the southern edge of Evans. It curves to the east-northeast and crosses over Crawford Creek. It then has an interchange with SR 383 (Jimmie Dyess Parkway/South Belair Road). Here, it leaves Evans and begins to travel along the southern edge of Martinez. It has an interchange with Wheeler Road. Within this interchange, it leaves Martinez and enters Richmond County.

Immediately, I-20 enters the city limits of Augusta. It travels just to the north of Doctors Hospital just before an interchange with the eastern terminus of SR 232 and the western terminus of I-520 (both parts of Bobby Jones Expressway). The westbound interchange has access for Walton Way Extension. After crossing over Cranes Creek, it travels south of Warren Road Elementary School. It curves to the northeast and has an interchange with SR 28 (Washington Road). The highway travels to the east of Westside High School. It crosses over some railroad tracks of CSX before an interchange with SR 104 (Riverwatch Parkway). The westbound lanes meet the Georgia Visitor Information Center. It crosses over the Augusta Canal and then the Savannah River. Here, the hidden SR 402 designation reaches its eastern terminus, while I-20 enters South Carolina.

=== Named sections ===
Several stretches of I-20 are named for various people and reasons:

- From the Alabama state line to I-285 on the west side of Atlanta, I-20 is named the Tom Murphy Freeway after the former speaker of the Georgia House of Representatives.
- Between both the west and east sides of I-285, I-20 was named the Ralph David Abernathy Freeway in 1991 after the late civil rights activist.
- From I-285 in Dekalb County to US 129/US 441/SR 24 in the southern part of Madison, I-20 is named the Purple Heart Highway for military veterans who either died or were injured in combat while in service on or after April 15, 1917.
- From US 129/US 441/SR 24 to the South Carolina state line, I-20 is named the Carl Sanders Highway after the former Georgia governor who was born in Augusta.

== History ==
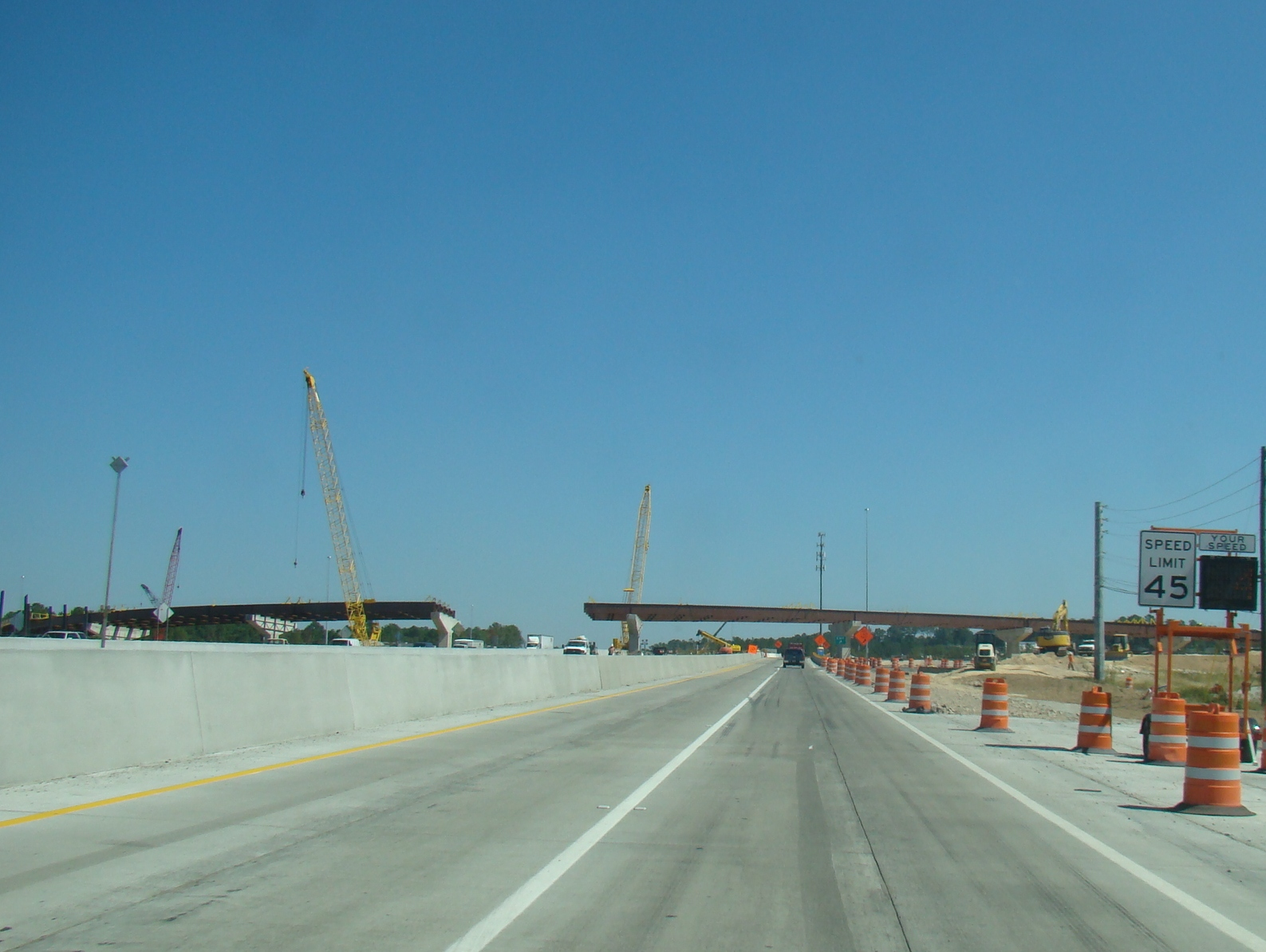
I-20 eastbound at the I-520 interchange. Flyover ramp under construction for I-20 westbound to I-520 eastbound.

I-20's path through Atlanta was designed in the late 1950s, during the era of segregation. The first segment opened between 1960 and 1963 from downtown Atlanta to Conyers. It was under construction from just south of Douglasville to downtown Atlanta, from Conyers to a point south of Social Circle, and from Evans to Augusta. By 1966, the highway was proposed from the Alabama state line to SR 5 in Douglasville, was open from Douglasville to the western part of Atlanta, under construction in the western part of Atlanta, was open from downtown Atlanta to US 278/SR 12 near Social Circle, was under construction from that point to SR 83 in Madison; proposed from Madison to the Warren–McDuffie county line, under construction from there to the South Carolina state line. Later that year, I-20 was open from Douglasville to the Social Circle area and from SR 383 on the Evans–Martinez city line to the South Carolina state line. In 1967, it was under construction from the Social Circle area to Siloam. It was open from US 221/SR 47 south of Appling to the South Carolina state line. In 1968, it was open from Douglasville to Madison and from just north of Thomson to the South Carolina state line. In 1969, the highway was open from Douglasville to US 129/US 441/SR 24 in Madison. In 1970, it was under construction from Madison to the Thomson area. In 1971, I-20 was open from Douglasville to SR 44 in Greensboro. The section between SR 44 near Greensboro and US 278 in Barnett was dedicated and opened on November 6, 1972, by Governor Jimmy Carter and South Carolina Lt. Governor Earle Morris Jr. This completed I-20 between Atlanta and Columbia, South Carolina. In 1973, it was under construction from US 27/SR 1 in Bremen to Douglasville. In 1974, it was under construction from the Alabama state line to Douglasville. The 10-mile (16 km) section between SR 61/101 in Villa Rica and SR 5 in Douglasville opened on August 29, 1975. The last part of I-20, 23.7 miles (38.1 km) between the Alabama state line and SR 61/101, opened on December 22, 1977, in a dedication ceremony officiated by Governor George Busbee.

Until 2000, the state of Georgia used the sequential interchange numbering system on all of its Interstate Highways. The first exit on each highway would begin with the number "1" and increase numerically with each exit. In 2000, the Georgia Department of Transportation switched to a mileage-based exit system, in which the exit number corresponded to the nearest milepost.

From a period of late 2014 to mid-2015, GDOT proposed to widen I-20 from the Alabama state line eastward to Villa Rica, GA. Most of that length had the roadway widened from four to six lanes, with ultimate plans to widen to at least six lanes from Birmingham, Alabama, to Atlanta. In 2015, the widening project begin. Phase 1, which detailed resurfacing the roadway for future expansion preparation, has been completed in 2021. Phase 2 is being prepared to add the additional third lane on I-20 from the Alabama state line to the Villa Rica interchange which is I-20 exit 24.

On April 17, 2017, an abandoned gas pipeline exploded under I-20.

== Future ==
=== I-285 interchanges ===
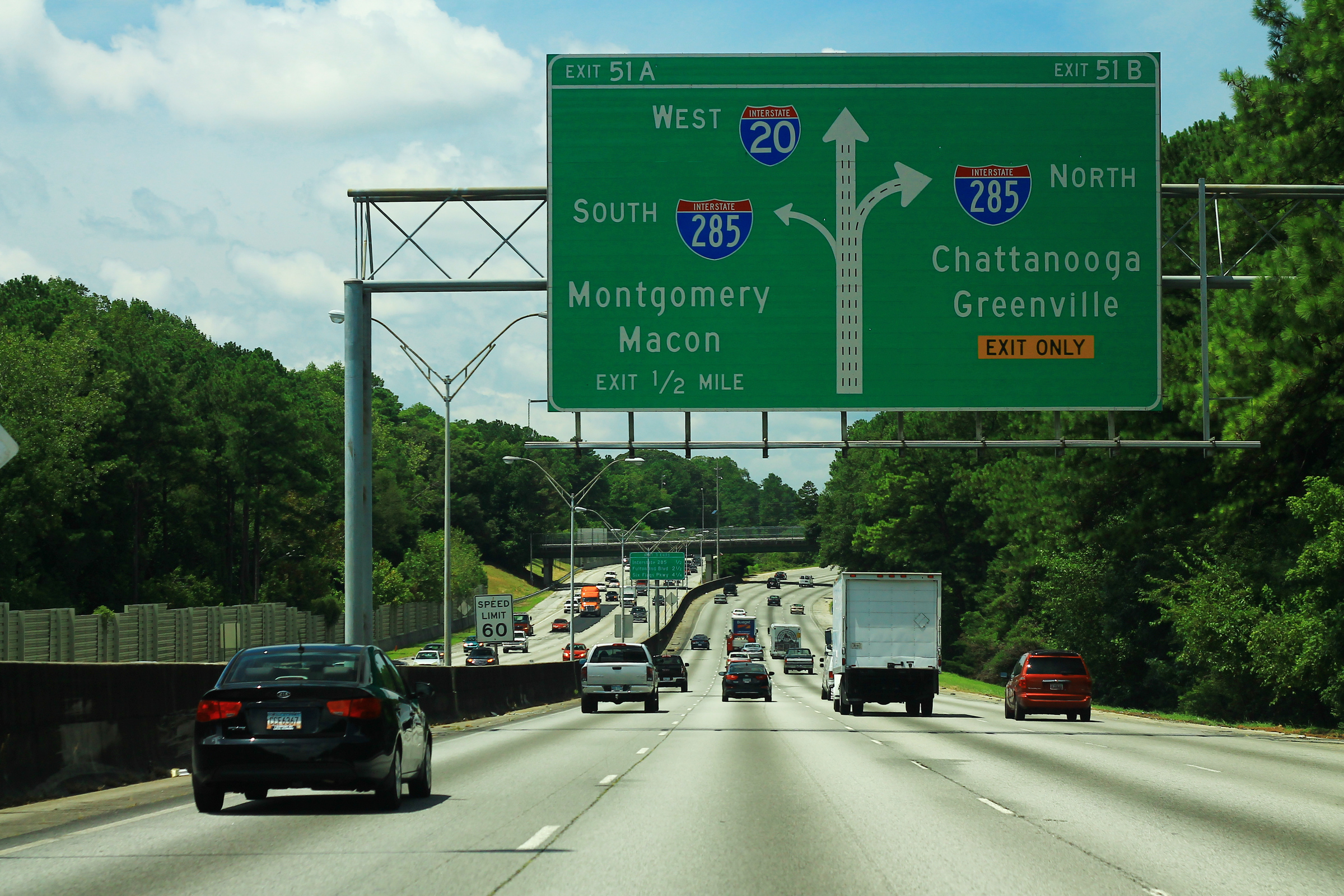
I-20 West approaching the I-285 interchange on the west side of Atlanta

Outside of the west side of Atlanta, this project calls for improvements of the interchange and addition of lanes along I-20 in Cobb, Douglas, and Fulton counties. Additional work includes construction of collector–distributor (CD) lanes and the modification or replacements of bridges along I-20. This project, once completed, will provide more efficient traffic flow through the interchange. This project focuses on reconstructing the interchange to remove left hand exits and improve design speed, and modification and/or replacement of existing bridges and ramps, construction of an I-20 westbound CD system from the interchange to Fulton Industrial Boulevard (FIB), construction of lanes and improvements along eight miles (13 km) of I-20 in both directions from Thornton Road to Hamilton E. Holmes Drive, modification and/or replacement of bridges along I-20, including bridges over CSX Railroad and the Chattahoochee River and finally, the addition of new lanes and improvements along two miles (3.2 km) of I-285 southbound from Hollowell Parkway to Martin Luther King Jr. Drive.

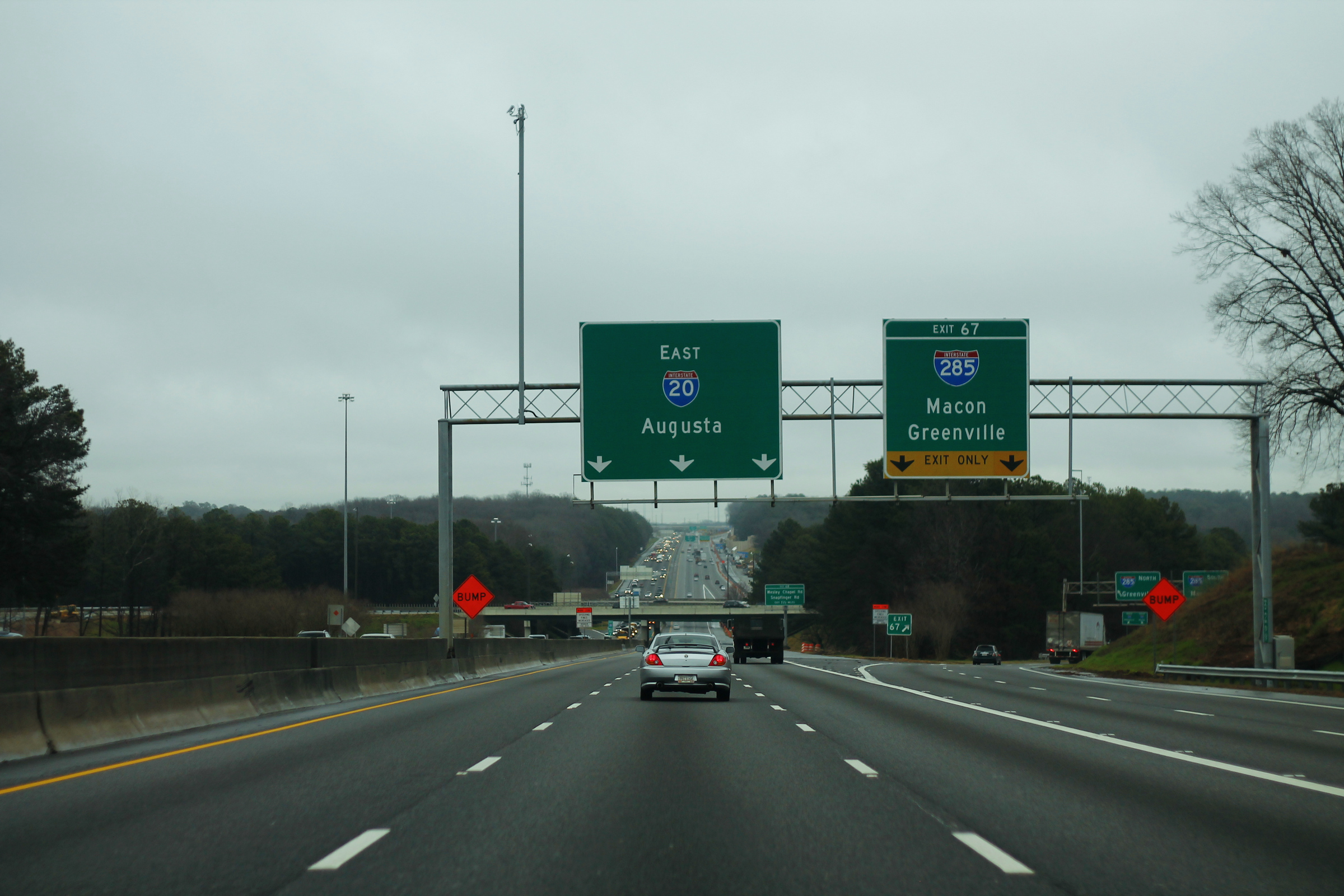
I-20 East approaching the I-285 interchange on the east side of Atlanta

Outside of the east side of Atlanta, this project will improve traffic flow and safety at this busy interchange. This critical junction in DeKalb County requires operational and geometric improvements to address inefficient flow of traffic and safety performance. This project focuses on reconstructing I-285/I-20 East Interchange ramps with more direct alignments and additional lanes where warranted, constructing new CD road along westbound I-20 and an additional lane in the eastbound I-20 CD road between the I-285/I-20 East Interchange and Wesley Chapel Road, adding auxiliary lanes along I-20 and I-285, replacing the Miller Road and Fairington Road bridges over I-20, and the I-20 bridge over Snapfinger Creek, widening the I-285 northbound bridge over Snapfinger Road and finally, constructing new noise barriers where feasible and reasonable per the preliminary noise impact assessment.

=== Express lanes ===
GDOT proposed to add express lanes known as HOT lanes on I-20 at the outer western and eastern side of Atlanta where the two interchanges of I-285 are located. Part of the plan of I-20 and I-285 interchange project is to make the bridges crossing above I-20 and I-285 to be built with higher height, so the HOT lanes can easily fit on I-20 and I-285 in the future right after the interchange project is complete. The construction will happen right after the I-285 interchange project at the western and eastern side of Atlanta is complete. Of course in the western side of Atlanta, the HOV lanes on I-20 needs to be extended westward from an interchange of I-75 and I-85 to an interchange of I-285 right before construction, so the HOV lanes can directly connect to the HOT lanes on I-20 at the outer western and eastern side of Atlanta where the two interchanges of I-285 are located.

=== Widening projects ===
From a period of late 2014 to mid-2015, GDOT proposed to widen I-20 from the Alabama state line eastward to Villa Rica. Most of that length had the roadway widened from four to six lanes, with ultimate plans to widen to at least six lanes from Birmingham to Atlanta. In 2015, the widening project began. Phase 1, which detailed resurfacing the roadway for future expansion preparation, has been completed in 2021. Phase 2 is being prepared to add the additional third lane on I-20 from the Alabama state line to the Villa Rica interchange (exit 24).

Another project represents the first bistate agreement between GDOT and SCDOT for a design–build project. This design–build project is for the widening of I-20 with an additional lane in each direction. The widening begins just west of SR 104 interchange (I-20 GA exit 200) and it will terminate at South Carolina Highway 230 (SC 230) interchange (I-20 SC exit 1). The project will widen 1.8 miles (2.9 km) of I-20, replace four bridges over the Augusta Canal and Savannah River, and make intersection improvements at the West Martintown Road interchange in South Carolina. This project will cost $72 million and is scheduled to be completed in 2022.

== Exit list ==
| County | Location | mi | km | Old exit | New exit | Destinations | Notes |
|---|---|---|---|---|---|---|---|
| Haralson | | 0.00 | 0.00 | | | I-20 west – Birmingham | Continuation into Alabama |
| Haralson | | 1.32 | 2.12 | Georgia Visitor Information Center; accessible from eastbound lanes only | | | |
| Haralson | Tallapoosa | 4.67 | 7.52 | 1 | 5 | SR 100 – Tallapoosa, Bowdon | |
| Haralson | | 8.95 | 14.40 | 2 | 9 | Waco Road – West Georgia Technical College | |
| Carroll | | 11.11 | 17.88 | 3 | 11 | US 27 (SR 1) – Bremen, Carrollton, University of West Georgia | |
| Carroll | | 14.99 | 24.12 | Weigh station; accessible from westbound lanes only | | | |
| Carroll | Temple | 18.70 | 30.09 | 4 | 19 | SR 113 – Temple | |
| Carroll | Villa Rica | 23.81 | 38.32 | 5 | 24 | SR 61 / SR 101 – Villa Rica, Dallas | Southern terminus of SR 101; former US 78S and US 78 Alt. |
| Douglas | | 26.05 | 41.92 | 6 | 26 | Liberty Road (SR 8 Conn. north) – Villa Rica | Southern terminus of SR 8 Conn. |
| Douglas | | 30.00 | 48.28 | 7 | 30 | Post Road | |
| Douglas | Douglasville | 34.15 | 54.96 | 8 | 34 | SR 5 (Bill Arp Road) – Douglasville | |
| Douglas | Douglasville | 35.62 | 57.32 | 9 | 36 | Chapel Hill Road | |
| Douglas | Douglasville | 37.39 | 60.17 | 10 | 37 | SR 92 (Fairburn Road) – Douglasville | |
| Douglas | Douglasville–Lithia Springs line | 41.26 | 66.40 | 11 | 41 | Lee Road – Lithia Springs | |
| Douglas | Sweetwater Creek | 43.47 | 69.96 | | | Blair Bridge | Crossing over Sweetwater Creek |
| Douglas | Lithia Springs | 44.00 | 70.81 | 12 | 44 | SR 6 (Thornton Road) – Austell, Powder Springs | |
| Cobb | | 46.60 | 75.00 | 13 | 46 | Riverside Parkway – Six Flags Park | Signed as exits 46A (Riverside Pkwy) and 46B (Six Flags Drive) westbound. |
| Cobb | Mableton | 47.10 | 75.80 | 13C | 47 | Six Flags Parkway – Six Flags Park | Westbound exit and eastbound entrance |
| Cobb–Fulton county line | Chattahoochee River | 47.84 | 76.99 | | | Debra Mills Commemorative Bridge | Crossing ovet the Chattahoochee River |
| Fulton | | 48.57 | 78.17 | 14 | 49 | SR 70 (Fulton Industrial Boulevard) – Fulton County Airport | |
| Fulton | Atlanta | 50.57 | 81.38 | 15 | 51 | I-285 (Atlanta Bypass / SR 407) – Montgomery, Macon, Chattanooga, Greenville | I-285 exits 10A-B; signed as exits 51A (south) and 51B (north) |
| Fulton | Atlanta | 52.07 | 83.80 | 16 | 52 | SR 280 (Hamilton E. Holmes Drive) | Signed as exits 52A (south) and 52B (north) westbound |
| Fulton | Atlanta | 53.63 | 86.31 | 17 | 53 | To SR 139 (Martin Luther King Jr. Drive) | |
| Fulton | Atlanta | 54.52 | 87.74 | 18 | 54 | Langhorn Street to Cascade Road | Westbound exit and eastbound entrance |
| Fulton | Atlanta | 55.34 | 89.06 | 19 | 55A | Lowery Boulevard – West End | |
| Fulton | Atlanta | 55.55 | 89.40 | 20 | 55B | Lee Street – Atlanta University Center, Fort McPherson | Westbound exit and eastbound entrance |
| Fulton | Atlanta | 56.19 | 90.43 | 21 | 56A | To US 19 / US 29 (US 41 / SR 3 / SR 14 / SR 154 / Whitehall Street / McDaniel Street) | Eastbound exit and westbound entrance |
| Fulton | Atlanta | 56.54 | 90.99 | 22 | 56B | Windsor Street / Spring Street / Ted Turner Drive – State Farm Arena | |
| Fulton | Atlanta | 57.01 | 91.75 | 23 | 57 | I-75 (SR 401) / I-85 (Downtown Connector / SR 295 / SR 403) – Macon, Montgomery, Chattanooga, Greenville | I-75/I-85 exit 247 |
| Fulton | Atlanta | 57.15 | 91.97 | 24 | 58A | Capitol Avenue – Downtown | Westbound exit and eastbound entrance |
| Fulton | Atlanta | 57.65 | 92.78 | 25 | 58B | Hill Street – Georgia State Stadium | Westbound exit and eastbound entrance |
| Fulton | Atlanta | 58.29 | 93.81 | 26 | 59A | Boulevard – Zoo Atlanta, Cyclorama | |
| Fulton | Atlanta | 58.86 | 94.73 | 27 | 59B | Bill Kennedy Way- to Memorial Drive / Glenwood Avenue | Eastbound exit and westbound entrance |
| Fulton–DeKalb county line | Atlanta | 59.39 | 95.58 | 28 | 60 | US 23 (Moreland Avenue / SR 42) | Signed as exits 60A (south) and 60B (north) eastbound |
| DeKalb | Atlanta | 60.25 | 96.96 | 29 | 61A | Maynard Terrace | Eastbound exit and westbound entrance |
| DeKalb | Atlanta | 60.73 | 97.74 | 30 | 61B | SR 260 (Glenwood Avenue) | Eastern terminus of SR 260 |
| DeKalb | Atlanta | 61.74 | 99.36 | 31 | 62 | Flat Shoals Road | Eastbound exit and westbound entrance |
| DeKalb | Gresham Park–Panthersville– Candler-McAfee tripoint | 62.92– 63.22 | 101.26– 101.74 | 32 | 63 | Flat Shoals Road / Gresham Road | |
| DeKalb | Panthersville–Candler-McAfee line | 65.18 | 104.90 | 33 | 65 | SR 155 (Candler Road) – Decatur | |
| DeKalb | Panthersville–Candler-McAfee line | 66.33 | 106.75 | 34 | 66 | Columbia Drive | Eastbound exit and westbound entrance |
| DeKalb | Panthersville–Candler-McAfee line | 66.95 | 107.75 | 35 | 67 | I-285 (Atlanta Bypass / SR 407) – Macon, Atlanta Airport, Chattanooga, Greenville | I-285 exit 46 southbound, 46A-B northbound; Pierre Howard Interchange |
| DeKalb | | 68.37 | 110.03 | 36 | 68 | Wesley Chapel Road / Snapfinger Road | Westbound exit is combined with exit 67 |
| DeKalb | | 71.21 | 114.60 | 37 | 71 | Panola Road | |
| DeKalb | | 73.49– 74.32 | 118.27– 119.61 | 38 | 74 | Evans Mill Road / Lithonia Industrial Boulevard – Lithonia | |
| DeKalb | | 75.97 | 122.26 | 39 | 75 | US 278 west / SR 12 west / SR 124 north (Turner Hill Road) – Snellville | Western end of US 278/SR 12 concurrency; southern terminus of SR 124 |
| Rockdale | | 77.86 | 125.30 | 40 | 78 | Sigman Road | |
| Rockdale | Conyers | 80.29 | 129.21 | 41 | 80 | West Avenue – Conyers | |
| Rockdale | Conyers | 81.88 | 131.77 | 42 | 82 | SR 20 / SR 138 – Conyers, Monroe, Athens | Future DDI interchange with future westbound on-ramp from Dogwood Drive (frontage road north of I-20), planned to be completed in Spring 2028 |
| Rockdale | | 83.91 | 135.04 | 43 | 84 | SR 162 (Salem Road) | Northern terminus of SR 162 |
| Newton | | 87.53 | 140.87 | 44 | 88 | Almon Road – Porterdale | |
| Newton | Covington | 90.22 | 145.20 | 45 | 90 | US 278 east (SR 12 east) – Covington, Oxford, Oxford College of Emory University | Eastern end of US 278/SR 12 concurrency |
| Newton | Covington | 92.14 | 148.28 | 45A | 92 | Alcovy Road | |
| Newton | | 93.30 | 150.15 | 46 | 93 | SR 142 (Hazelbrand Road) – Covington, Oxford | |
| Newton | | 97.63 | 157.12 | 47 | 98 | SR 11 – Monroe, Monticello, Charlie Elliott Wildlife Center, Georgia Perimeter College – Newton Campus, Social Circle, Mansfield | |
| Newton | Social Circle | 100.56 | 161.84 | 48 | 101 | US 278 (SR 12) – State Headquarters Wildlife Resources Div. | |
| Walton | No major junctions | | | | | | |
| Morgan | | 102.78 | 165.41 | Rest area; accessible from eastbound lanes only; traffic returning back to I-20 from the rest area must go through the Old Mill Road interchange | | | |
| Morgan | | | | — | 104 | Old Mill Road | Opened in December 2025 |
| Morgan | | 104.70 | 168.50 | 49 | 105 | Rutledge, Newborn, Hard Labor Creek State Park | Newborn Road |
| Morgan | | 107.92 | 173.68 | Rest area; accessible from westbound lanes only | | | |
| Morgan | Madison | 112.77 | 181.49 | 50 | 113 | SR 83 – Madison, Monticello | |
| Morgan | Madison | 114.27 | 183.90 | 51 | 114 | US 129 / US 441 (SR 24 / Eatonton Road) – Madison, Eatonton, Athens, Milledgeville, University of Georgia, Georgia College & State University, Antebellum Trail, Rock Eagle, Lake Oconee, Lake Sinclair | |
| Morgan | | 121.04 | 194.79 | 52 | 121 | Buckhead, Lake Oconee | Seven Island Road |
| Greene | Greensboro | 130.14 | 209.44 | 53 | 130 | SR 44 (Lake Oconee Parkway) – Greensboro, Eatonton, Lake Oconee | |
| Greene | Siloam | 137.41 | 221.14 | 54 | 138 | SR 77 to SR 15 – Siloam, Union Point, Sparta, Sandersville | |
| Taliaferro | | 147.49 | 237.36 | 55 | 148 | SR 22 – Crawfordville, Sparta, Washington | |
| Warren | | 154.10 | 248.00 | 56 | 154 | US 278 (SR 12) – Warrenton, Washington | |
| Warren | | 159.38 | 256.50 | 57 | 160 | Norwood | Cadley Road |
| Warren | | 165.04 | 265.61 | 58 | 165 | SR 80 – Camak | |
| McDuffie | | 168.73 | 271.54 | — | 169 | Thomson | Three Points Road |
| McDuffie | | 171.80 | 276.49 | 59 | 172 | SR 17 (Washington Road) to US 78 (SR 10) – Thomson, Washington, Lincolnton | |
| McDuffie | | 175.02 | 281.67 | 60 | 175 | SR 150 (Cobbham Road) – Thomson, Mistletoe State Park | |
| Columbia | | 181.46 | 292.03 | Rest area; accessible from eastbound lanes only | | | |
| Columbia | | 181.91 | 292.76 | Rest area; accessible from westbound lanes only | | | |
| Columbia | | 182.66 | 293.96 | 61 | 183 | US 221 / SR 47 (Appling–Harlem Road) – Appling, Harlem, Clarks Hill Lake, Laurel and Hardy Museum | |
| Columbia | | | | — | 185 | Louisville Road – Fort Gordon | Future interchange designed to connect the interstate to the fort |
| Columbia | | 187.20 | 301.27 | Weigh station; accessible from eastbound lanes only | | | |
| Columbia | | 187.47 | 301.70 | Weigh station; accessible from westbound lanes only | | | |
| Columbia | | 189.42 | 304.84 | 62 | 190 | SR 388 (Horizon South Parkway / Lewiston Road) – Grovetown | |
| Columbia | Evans–Martinez line | 193.38 | 311.21 | 63 | 194 | SR 383 (Jimmie Dyess Parkway / South Belair Road) – Evans, Fort Gordon | SR 383's name change is just south of I-20. |
| Columbia–Richmond county line | Martinez–Augusta line | 194.79 | 313.48 | 63A | 195 | Wheeler Road | |
| Richmond | Augusta | 196.20– 196.47 | 315.75– 316.19 | 64 | 196 | I-520 east / SR 232 west (Bobby Jones Expressway) / Walton Way Ext – Martinez, Augusta, Daniel Field, Augusta Regional Airport | I-520 exit 1; formerly signed as exits 196A & 196B eastbound; eastern terminus of SR 232; western terminus of I-520; westbound exit and eastbound entrance only for Walton Way Extension |
| Richmond | Augusta | 198.93 | 320.15 | 65 | 199 | SR 28 (Washington Road) – Augusta, Augusta University, Paine College | |
| Richmond | Augusta | 199.89 | 321.69 | 66 | 200 | SR 104 (Riverwatch Parkway) – Augusta, Augusta Historic Districts, Augusta Canal | |
| Richmond | Augusta | 200.50 | 322.67 | Georgia Visitor Information Center; accessible from westbound lanes only | | | |
| Richmond | Augusta | 201.21 | 323.82 | | | I-20 east – Columbia | Continuation into South Carolina |
1.000 mi = 1.609 km; 1.000 km = 0.621 mi: Concurrency terminus; Incomplete access; Unopened

== Auxiliary routes ==
=== Interstate 520 ===
Interstate 520
- Location: Augusta, Georgia–North Augusta, South Carolina
- Length: 23.34 mi (37.56 km)
- Existed: 1980–present

Interstate 520 (I-520) is a 23.34-mile-long (37.56 km) auxiliary route from Augusta, Georgia, to North Augusta, South Carolina. Approximately 15.62 miles (25.14 km) of the highway is in Georgia. It is also known as the Bobby Jones Expressway in Georgia and the Palmetto Parkway in South Carolina. The Georgia part of the highway has an unsigned designation of State Route 415 (SR 415). Despite its odd first number, both of its terminuses are at I-20 (albeit in two different states), as it loops around the Augusta–North Augusta area to the south.

=== Interstate 420 ===
Interstate 420
- Location: Atlanta
- Length: 5.40 mi (8.69 km)
- Existed: 1983–1986

Interstate 420 (I-420) was an auxiliary Interstate Highway that was planned to bypass south of Atlanta. It is now known as Arthur B. Langford Jr. Parkway. If built, it would have had the unsigned designation State Route 414 (SR 414). It was not built because of opposition from communities in its path.

== See also ==
- Transportation in Atlanta
- Transportation in Augusta, Georgia
- Central Savannah River Area

Interstate 20
| Previous state: Alabama | Georgia | Next state: South Carolina |
