= Shamsid-Deen =

Shamsid-Deen is a surname. Notable people with the surname include:

- Abdul Shamsid-Deen (born 1968), American basketball player
- Hassan Shamsid-Deen (born 1976), American football player
- Muhammad Shamsid-Deen (born 1969), American football player
