= 2012 Georgia State Panthers softball team =

American college softball season

2012 Georgia State Panthers softball
- Conference: Colonial Athletic Association
- Record: 38–18 (15–9 CAA)
- Head coach: Roger Kincaid
- Home stadium: Robert E. Heck Baseball Complex

The 2012 Georgia State Panthers softball team represented Georgia State University in the 2012 NCAA Division I softball season. The Panthers competed in the Colonial Athletic Association and were led by second-year head coach Roger Kincaid. Georgia State played its home games at the Robert E. Heck Softball Complex in Panthersville, Georgia.

== Roster ==
2012 Georgia State roster
Pitchers: 45 Emily Clay – Freshman; 27 Erin Collins – Senior; 13 McCall Langford – Junior; 24 Kaitlyn Medlam – Sophomore; 21 Alana Thomas – Senior	Catchers: 16 Emily Althafer – Senior; 12 Taylor Scarpantonio – Freshman; 25 Maddy Stanton – Sophomore; Infielders: 8 Callie Alford – Freshman; 28 Cassie Boese – Senior; 18 Lauren Coleman – Freshman; 26 Megan Kallatsa – Senior; 29 Megan Kildahn – (redshirt) Freshman; 10 Whitney Phillips – Junior	Outfielders: 2 Ashley Christy – Freshman; 23 Jessica Clifton - Sophomore; 3 Bethany Horne – Freshman; 30 Audrey Mason – Junior; 7 Shannyn Palazzo – Freshman; 14 Christina Reed – Senior; 1 Chelsea Sparks - (redshirt) Junior; 19 Emily Whitaker - Senior; 22 Carrie Williams - Junior

== Schedule ==
2012 Georgia State Panthers softball game log
Regular season
February

#	Date	Opponent	Site/stadium	Score	Overall record	CAA record
1	February 11	Longwood	Bob Heck Field	3-2	1-0	-
2	February 11	ETSU	Bob Heck Field	11-2	2-0	-
3	February 12	Western Carolina	Bob Heck Field	7-5	3-0	-
4	February 12	Longwood	Bob Heck Field	7-11	3-1	-
5	February 15	Georgia Southern	Statesboro, GA	1-0	4-1	-
6	February 15	Georgia Southern	Statesboro, GA	1-4	4-2	-
7	February 18	Chattanooga	Bob Heck Field	5-1	5-2	-
8	February 19	Eastern Illinois	Bob Heck Field	7-0	6-2	-
9	February 19	IUPUI	Bob Heck Field	1-0	7-2	-
10	February 22	Auburn	Bob Heck Field	1-9	7-3	-
11	February 24	Eastern Kentucky	Woodstock, GA	2-5	7-4	-
12	February 24	SE Louisiana	Woodstock, GA	12-0	8-4	-
13	February 25	Central Arkansas	Woodstock, GA	4-3	9-4	-
14	February 25	Campbell	Woodstock, GA	9-6	10-4	-
15	February 26	Robert Morris	Woodstock, GA	5-0	11-4	-
16	February 29	Georgia Tech	Bob Heck Field	2-1	12-4	-

March

#	Date	Opponent	Site/stadium	Score	Overall record	CAA record
17	March 2	Tennessee Tech	Woodstock, GA	8-7	13-4	-
18	March 2	Western Kentucky	Woodstock, GA	2-3	13-5	-
19	March 3	Elon	Woodstock, GA	Cancelled	-	-
20	March 3	Rhode Island	Woodstock, GA	4-0	14-5	-
21	March 4	Morehead State	Woodstock, GA	5-3	15-5	-
22	March 4	Furman	Woodstock, GA	2-0	16-5	-
23	March 8	Jacksonville State	Jacksonville, AL	4-2	17-5	-
24	March 8	Jacksonville State	Jacksonville, AL	5-3	18-5	-
25	March 11	Mercer	Bob Heck Field	2-3	18-6	-
26	March 11	Mercer	Bob Heck Field	2-1	19-6	-
27	March 17	Kennesaw State	Kennesaw, GA	3-1	20-6	-
28	March 17	Kennesaw State	Kennesaw, GA	1-3	20-7	-
29	March 21	Georgia	Athens, GA	0-6	20-8	-
30	March 24	Hofstra	Bob Heck Field	6-8	20-9	0-1
31	March 24	Hofstra	Bob Heck Field	0-16	20-10	0-2
32	March 25	Hofstra	Bob Heck Field	1-4	20-11	0-3
33	March 31	Towson	Bob Heck Field	4-0	21-11	1-3
34	March 31	Towson	Bob Heck Field	8-1	22-11	2-3

April

#	Date	Opponent	Site/stadium	Score	Overall record	CAA record
35	April 1	Towson	Bob Heck Field	4-0	23-11	3-3
36	April 4	Furman	Greenville, SC	2-0	24-11	3-3
37	April 4	Furman	Greenville, SC	7-2	25-11	3-3
38	April 6	UNC Wilmington	Wilmington, NC	8-0	26-11	4-3
39	April 6	UNC Wilmington	Wilmington, NC	6-0	27-11	5-3
40	April 7	UNC Wilmington	Wilmington, NC	4-1	28-11	6-3
41	April 11	Georgia Tech	Atlanta, GA	2-3	28-12	6-3
42	April 14	Drexel Dragons	Bob Heck Field	3-2	29-12	7-3
43	April 14	Drexel Dragons	Bob Heck Field	8-0	30-12	8-3
44	April 15	Drexel Dragons	Bob Heck Field	6-1	31-12	9-3
45	April 19	Alabama	Tuscaloosa, AL	5-1	32-12	9-3
46	April 21	Delaware	Newark, DE	7-0	33-12	10-3
47	April 21	Delaware	Newark, DE	1-3	33-13	10-4
48	April 22	Delaware	Newark, DE	Cancelled	-	-
49	April 28	James Madison	Bob Heck Field	1-4	33-14	10-5
50	April 28	James Madison	Bob Heck Field	5-1	34-14	11-5
51	April 29	James Madison	Bob Heck Field	1-3	34-15	11-6

May

#	Date	Opponent	Site/stadium	Score	Overall record	CAA record
52	May 4	George Mason	Fairfax, VA	2-3	34-16	11-7
53	May 4	George Mason	Fairfax, VA	6-0	35-16	12-7
54	May 5	George Mason	Fairfax, VA	2-0	36-16	13-7

Post-season
CAA softball tournament

#	Date	Opponent	Site/stadium	Score	Overall record	CAA record	CAA tournament record
55	May 10	James Madison	Hempstead, NY	7-4	37-16	14-7	1-0
56	May 11	Hofstra	Hempstead, NY	0-1	37-17	14-8	1-1
57	May 11	James Madison	Hempstead, NY	9-1	38-17	15-8	2-1
58	May 12	Hofstra	Hempstead, NY	1-9	38-18	15-9	2-2
