= Snapfinger, Georgia =

- Unincorporated community
- Location within the state of Georgia Snapfinger (the United States)
- Coordinates: 33°41′13″N 84°12′6″W
- Country: United States
- State: Georgia
- County: DeKalb
- Elevation: 279 ft (85 m)
- Time zone: UTC-5 (Eastern (EST))
  - Summer (DST): UTC-4 (EDT)
- GNIS feature ID: 333078

Snapfinger is an unincorporated community in DeKalb County, Georgia, United States.

== History ==
A post office called Snapfinger was established in 1881, and remained in operation until 1901. The community takes its name from nearby Snapfinger Creek.
