= Rayville =

Rayville or Raysville is the name of several towns in the United States:

- Raysville, Georgia
- Raysville, Indiana
- Rayville, Louisiana
- Rayville, Missouri
