= Norwood, Georgia =

- City
- Location in Warren County and the state of Georgia
- Coordinates: 33°27′50″N 82°42′21″W
- Country: United States
- State: Georgia
- County: Warren

Area
  - Total: 0.83 sq mi (2.14 km^{2})
  - Land: 0.81 sq mi (2.11 km^{2})
  - Water: 0.012 sq mi (0.03 km^{2})
- Elevation: 614 ft (187 m)

Population (2020)
  - Total: 202
  - Density: 248.0/sq mi (95.77/km^{2})
- Time zone: UTC-5 (Eastern (EST))
  - Summer (DST): UTC-4 (EDT)
- ZIP code: 30821
- Area code: 706
- FIPS code: 13-56560
- GNIS feature ID: 0319712

Norwood is a city in Warren County, Georgia, United States. The population was 202 in 2020.

== History ==
The Georgia General Assembly incorporated Norwood as a town in 1885. The community most likely was named after a local family.

== Geography ==
Norwood is located at 33°27′50″N 82°42′21″W (33.463962, -82.705700).

According to the United States Census Bureau, the city has a total area of 0.8 square miles (2.1 km^{2}), all land.

=== Major highways ===
- Interstate 20
- U.S. Route 278
- State Route 12
- State Route 402 (unsigned designation for I-20)

== Demographics ==
Historical population
| Census | Pop. | Note | %± |
|---|---|---|---|
| 1890 | 332 | | — |
| 1900 | 299 | | −9.9% |
| 1910 | 340 | | 13.7% |
| 1920 | 366 | | 7.6% |
| 1930 | 401 | | 9.6% |
| 1940 | 269 | | −32.9% |
| 1950 | 268 | | −0.4% |
| 1960 | 294 | | 9.7% |
| 1970 | 272 | | −7.5% |
| 1980 | 306 | | 12.5% |
| 1990 | 238 | | −22.2% |
| 2000 | 299 | | 25.6% |
| 2010 | 239 | | −20.1% |
| 2020 | 202 | | −15.5% |
U.S. Decennial Census; 1850-1870 1870-1880; 1890-1910 1920-1930; 1940 1950 1960; 1970 1980 1990; 2000 2010 2020

=== Racial and ethnic composition ===
Norwood city, Georgia – Racial and ethnic composition Note: the US Census treats Hispanic/Latino as an ethnic category. This table excludes Latinos from the racial categories and assigns them to a separate category. Hispanics/Latinos may be of any race.
| Race / Ethnicity (NH = Non-Hispanic) | Pop 2000 | Pop 2010 | Pop 2020 | % 2000 | % 2010 | % 2020 |
|---|---|---|---|---|---|---|
| White alone (NH) | 110 | 76 | 55 | 36.79% | 31.80% | 27.23% |
| Black or African American alone (NH) | 187 | 160 | 141 | 62.54% | 66.95% | 69.80% |
| Native American or Alaska Native alone (NH) | 0 | 0 | 0 | 0.00% | 0.00% | 0.00% |
| Asian alone (NH) | 0 | 0 | 1 | 0.00% | 0.00% | 0.50% |
| Native Hawaiian or Pacific Islander alone (NH) | 0 | 0 | 0 | 0.00% | 0.00% | 0.00% |
| Other race alone (NH) | 0 | 1 | 0 | 0.00% | 0.42% | 0.00% |
| Mixed race or Multiracial (NH) | 0 | 0 | 5 | 0.00% | 0.00% | 2.48% |
| Hispanic or Latino (any race) | 2 | 2 | 0 | 0.67% | 0.84% | 0.00% |
| Total | 299 | 239 | 202 | 100.00% | 100.00% | 100.00% |

At the 2000 census there were 299 people, 126 households, and 82 families living in the city. By 2020, its population was 202.

== See also ==
- Central Savannah River Area
