= Uchee Creek (Georgia) =

Uchee Creek Euchee Creek, Yuchi Creek
- Location of mouth of Uchee Creek in Georgia Location in the United States
- Etymology: Yuchi people

Location
- Country: United States
- State: Georgia
- County: Columbia
- City: Grovetown

Physical characteristics
- Source
  - location: North of Harlem
  - coordinates: 33°26′26″N 082°19′04″W
  - elevation: 477.65 ft (145.59 m)
- Mouth: Little River
  - location: North of Evans
  - coordinates: 33°35′37″N 082°08′50″W
  - elevation: 187.93 ft (57.28 m)

Basin features
- Tributaries
  - left: Broad Branch; Long Branch
  - right: Spring Creek; Horn Creek; Mill Branch; Tudor Branch

Uchee Creek is a stream in the east-central part of the U.S. state of Georgia. It derives its name from the Yuchi (or Uchee) Indians, who once lived in the area. Variant spellings are Euchee Creek and Yuchi Creek.

Its source is just north of Harlem, and its mouth is at the Little River north of Evans. Both Harlem–Grovetown Road and William Few Parkway have two crossing of Uchee Creek each. The stream only flows through a portion of one city, Grovetown, through which it flows through the far northwestern part.

== Course ==
Uchee Creek begins at its source, which is just north of Harlem. This point is located between Fairview Drive and U.S. Route 221 and Georgia State Route 47 (US 221/SR 47; Appling–Harlem Road). The stream flows to the southeast and goes underneath of US 221/SR 47 and immediately afterward goes underneath Robert Moore Road. It winds its way to the east and resumes its southeasterly course, where it flows underneath of Harlem–Grovetown Road. It then bends to an east-southeasterly direction. It curves to the east-northeast and meets the mouth of Spirit Creek. Uchee Creek flows to the northeast, between Rockford Drive and Carlene Drive. It heads back to the east-northeast and goes underneath of Old Louisville Road. After meeting the mouth of Horn Creek, it flows to the north and then back to the northeast. Northwest of Wells Lake, it twists to the north. It curves back to the north-northeast. Upon flowing underneath Harlem–Grovetown Road for a second time, it enters the city limits of Grovetown and begins to traverse the western edge of Grovetown Trails at Euchee Creek, a future portion of the Euchee Creek Greenway. It enters the trails property and flows underneath the northernmost trail at two different locations. It bends to the north-northwest and goes under this trail before leaving the property. It flows just west of the property and meets the mouth of Broad Branch. Here, it begins flowing back to the northeast. Upon going underneath of SR 223 (Wrightsboro Road), it leaves Grovetown and the trail property. Uchee Creek then flows to the north-northeast and travels underneath of Canterbury Farms Parkway and part of the Euchee Creek Greenway in two places. It heads to the north and flows under the Greenway again. Almost immediately, it flows underneath Interstate 20 (I-20; Carl Sanders Highway). After going under William Few Parkway, it heads back to the north-northeast and then meets the mouth of Mill Branch. The stream flows under SR 232 (Columbia Road). It then travels through the Bartram Trail Golf Club. It then twists back to the northeast. Upon meeting the mouth of Tudor Branch, it bends back to the north-northeast. It then flows just to the west of Blanchard Woods Park and changes direction back to the north-northwest. It then flows under SR 104 (Washington Road) on the G.B. "Dip" Lamkin Bridge. The stream begins to bend back to the north-northeast. Immediately after meeting the mouth of Long Branch, it flows under William Few Parkway for a second time. It widens out briefly before narrowing just before its mouth, at the Little River.

== Crossings ==
Crossing	Carries	Location	Built	Coordinates	Reference
unnamed bridge	US 221 / SR 47 (Appling–Harlem Road)	North of Harlem			
unnamed bridge	Robert Moore Road	North of Harlem			
unnamed bridge	Harlem–Grovetown Road	Northeast of Harlem			
unnamed bridge	Old Louisville Road	North of Berzelia			
unnamed bridge	Harlem–Grovetown Road	Grovetown	1996		
unnamed bridge	Grovetown Trails at Euchee Creek	Grovetown			
unnamed bridge	Grovetown Trails at Euchee Creek	Grovetown			
unnamed bridge	SR 223 (Wrightsboro Road)	Grovetown	2011		
unnamed bridge	Canterbury Farms Parkway	North of Grovetown			
unnamed bridge	Euchee Creek Greenway	North of Grovetown			
unnamed bridge	Euchee Creek Greenway	North of Grovetown			
unnamed bridge	Euchee Creek Greenway	North of Grovetown			
unnamed bridge	I-20 (Carl Sanders Highway / SR 402)	North of Grovetown	1966		
unnamed bridge	William Few Parkway	North of Grovetown	1984		
unnamed bridge	SR 232 (Columbia Road)	North of Grovetown	1982		
G.B. "Dip" Lamkin Bridge	SR 104 (Washington Road)	Northwest of Evans	1971		
unnamed bridge	William Few Parkway	Northwest of Evans			
