= Gresham Park, Georgia =

- Unincorporated community Census-designated place
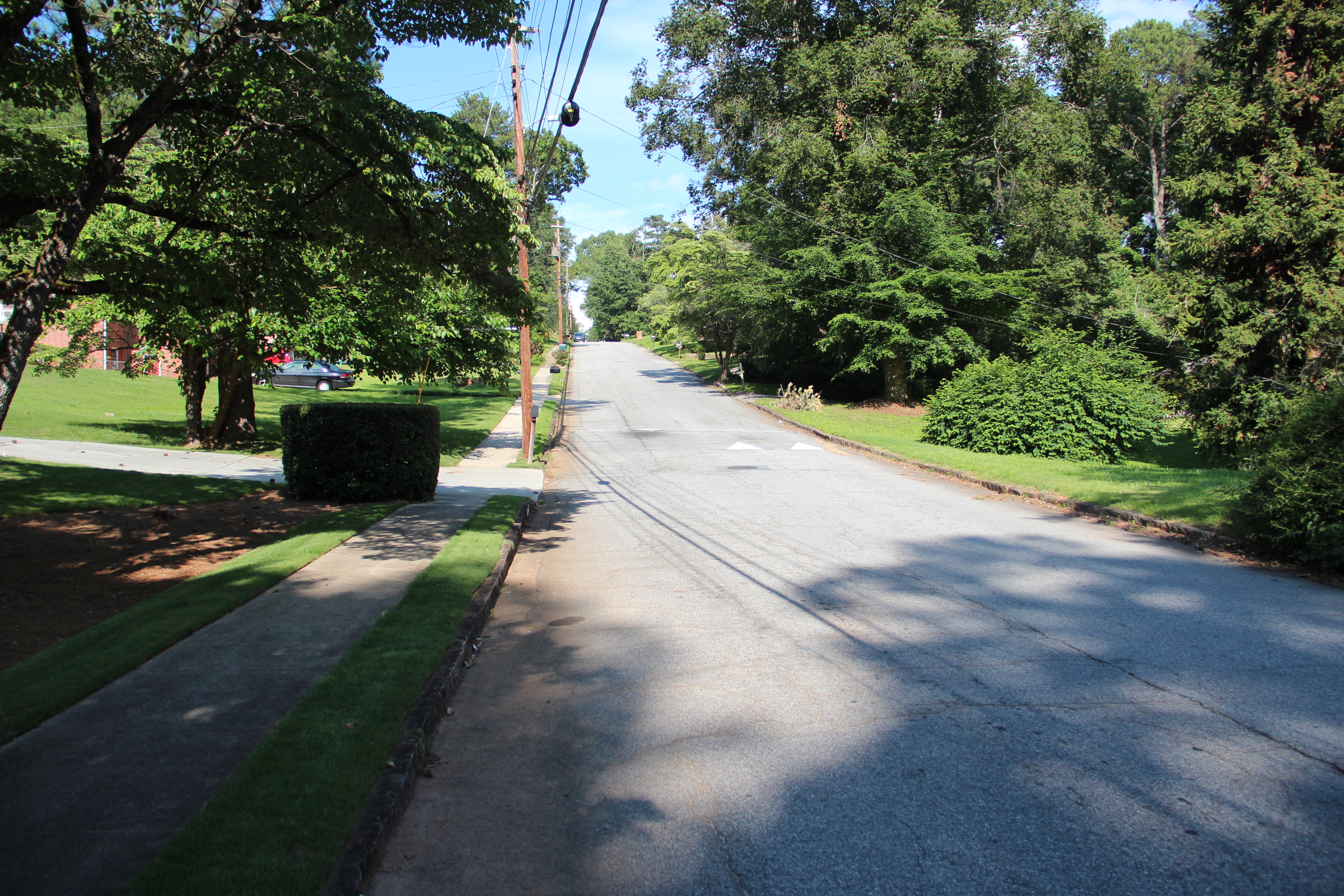
- A street in Gresham Park

- Location within central Metro Atlanta
- Coordinates: 33°42′12″N 84°18′52″W
- Country: United States
- State: Georgia
- County: DeKalb

Area
  - Total: 2.81 sq mi (7.28 km^{2})
  - Land: 2.81 sq mi (7.27 km^{2})
  - Water: 0 sq mi (0.00 km^{2})
- Elevation: 899 ft (274 m)

Population (2020)
  - Total: 7,700
  - Density: 2,742.8/sq mi (1,058.99/km^{2})
- Time zone: UTC-5 (Eastern (EST))
  - Summer (DST): UTC-4 (EDT)
- FIPS code: 13-35240
- GNIS feature ID: 1867241

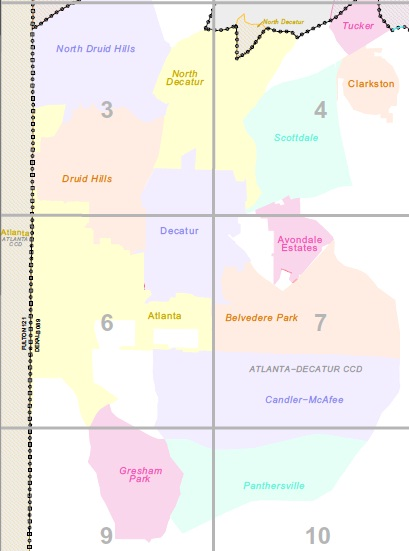
CDPs bordering eastern Atlanta

Gresham Park is an unincorporated community and census-designated place (CDP) in DeKalb County, Georgia, United States. The population was 7,700 at the 2020 census.

== Geography ==
Gresham Park is located at 33°42′12″N 84°18′52″W (33.703357, -84.314366). It is bordered by, on the:

- North: I-20, across which is the Longdale Park area of unincorporated DeKalb County
- Northwest: by the East Atlanta neighborhood of the city of Atlanta
- West: unincorporated DeKalb County, to the west of which is southeast Atlanta
- South: Constitution Road and Clifton Church Road, across which are the Bouldercrest and Cedar Grove areas of unincorporated DeKalb County
- East: Flat Shoals Road and Clifton Church Road, across which is the Panthersville CDP
- Northeast: at Flat Shoals Blvd. and I-20, to the northeast of which is the Candler-McAfee CDP

According to the United States Census Bureau, the CDP has a total area of 2.8 square miles (7.3 km^{2}), all land.

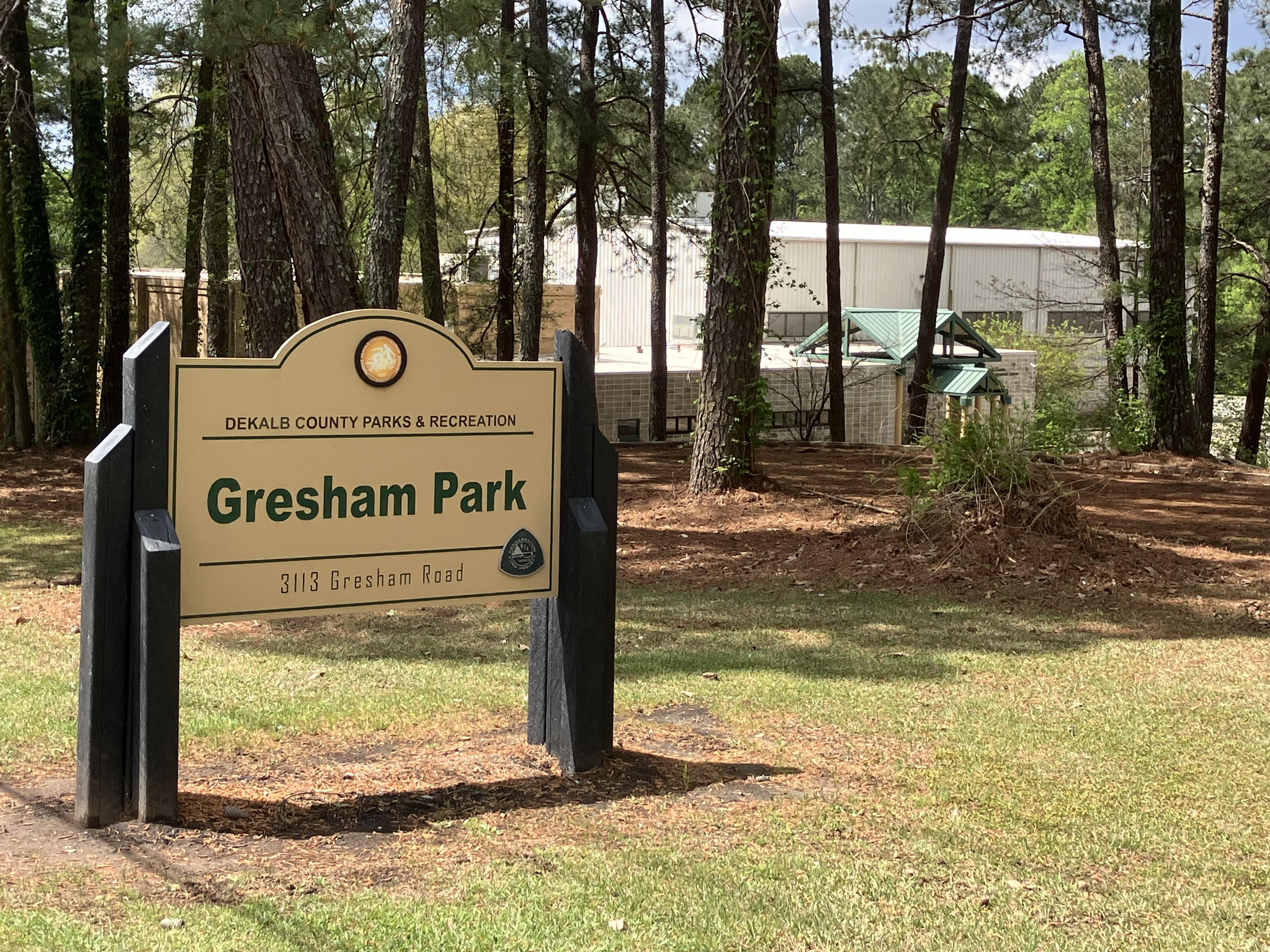
Gresham Park Sign in Gresham Park Georgia (April 2025)

== Demographics ==
Historical population
Census	Pop.	Note	%±
1980	6,232		—
1990	9,000		44.4%
2000	9,215		2.4%
2010	7,432		−19.3%
2020	7,700		3.6%
U.S. Decennial Census; 1850-1870 1870-1880; 1890-1910 1920-1930; 1940 1950 1960; 1970 1980 1990; 2000 2010 2020

Gresham Park was first listed as a census designated place in the 1980 U.S. census.

=== Racial and ethnic composition ===
Gresham Park, Georgia – Racial and ethnic composition Note: the US Census treats Hispanic/Latino as an ethnic category. This table excludes Latinos from the racial categories and assigns them to a separate category. Hispanics/Latinos may be of any race.
Race / Ethnicity (NH = Non-Hispanic)	Pop 2000	Pop 2010	Pop 2020	% 2000	% 2010	% 2020
White alone (NH)	271	599	1,348	2.94%	8.06%	17.51%
Black or African American alone (NH)	8,758	6,563	5,596	95.04%	88.31%	72.68%
Native American or Alaska Native alone (NH)	29	5	10	0.31%	0.07%	0.13%
Asian alone (NH)	2	24	73	0.02%	0.32%	0.95%
Native Hawaiian or Pacific Islander alone (NH)	1	0	0	0.01%	0.00%	0.00%
Other race alone (NH)	20	12	43	0.22%	0.16%	0.56%
Mixed race or Multiracial (NH)	56	118	272	0.61%	1.59%	3.53%
Hispanic or Latino (any race)	78	111	358	0.85%	1.49%	4.65%
Total	9,215	7,432	7,700	100.00%	100.00%	100.00%

=== 2020 census ===
As of the 2020 census, Gresham Park had a population of 7,700. The median age was 37.0 years. 17.3% of residents were under the age of 18 and 16.3% of residents were 65 years of age or older. For every 100 females there were 90.9 males, and for every 100 females age 18 and over there were 88.5 males age 18 and over.

100.0% of residents lived in urban areas, while 0.0% lived in rural areas.

There were 3,247 households in Gresham Park, of which 24.5% had children under the age of 18 living in them. Of all households, 26.3% were married-couple households, 23.6% were households with a male householder and no spouse or partner present, and 40.5% were households with a female householder and no spouse or partner present. About 30.2% of all households were made up of individuals and 8.5% had someone living alone who was 65 years of age or older. There were 1,667 families residing in the CDP.

There were 3,497 housing units, of which 7.1% were vacant. The homeowner vacancy rate was 2.8% and the rental vacancy rate was 6.9%.

== Education ==
It is in the DeKalb County Public Schools. Zoned schools:

- Elementary schools: Barack H. Obama EMST (most) and Ronald E. McNair DLA (some) (both outside of the CDP)
- Middle schools: Ronald E. McNair (outside of the CDP)
- High schools: Ronald E. McNair High School (in the CDP)

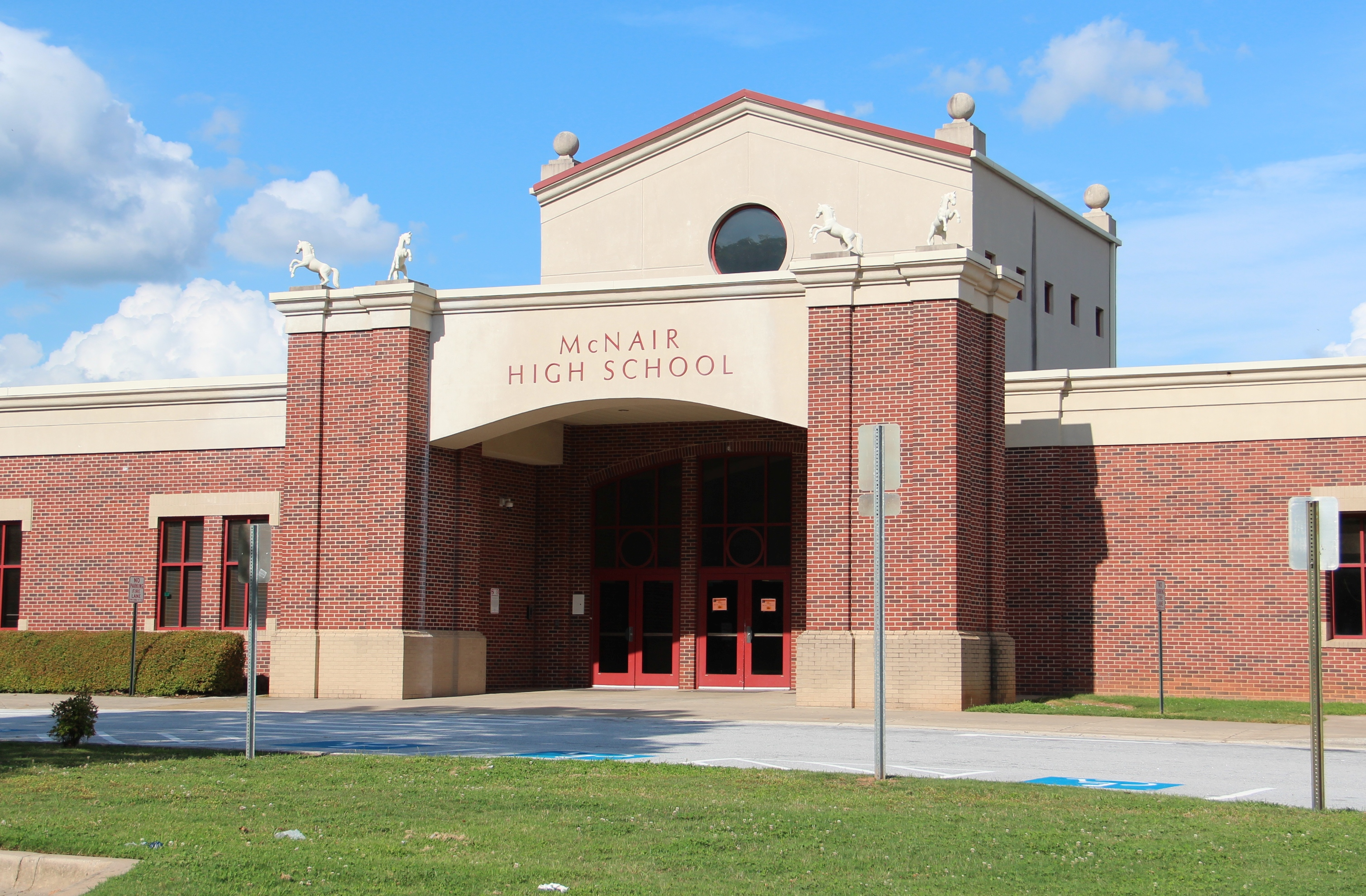
Ronald E. McNair High School
