= Hassan Shamsid-Deen =

American football player (born 1976)

No. 30, 2
- Position: Defensive back

Personal information
- Born: January 26, 1976 (age 50); Atlanta, Georgia, U.S.
- Listed height: 5 ft 9 in (1.75 m)
- Listed weight: 183 lb (83 kg)

Career information
- High school: McNair (Atlanta)
- College: North Carolina State (1994–1997)
- NFL draft: 1998: undrafted

Career history
- Buffalo Bills (1998)*; Scottish Claymores (1999)*; Winnipeg Blue Bombers (1999)*; Grand Rapids Rampage (1999–2001); Orlando Rage (2001); Dallas Desperados (2002)
- * Offseason or practice squad member only

Awards and highlights
- ArenaBowl champion (2001)
- Stats at ArenaFan.com

Hassan Kalimah Shamsid-Deen (born January 26, 1976) is an American former professional football defensive back who played four seasons in the Arena Football League (AFL) with the Grand Rapids Rampage and Dallas Desperados. He played college football at North Carolina State University. He also played for the Orlando Rage of the XFL.

== Early life ==
Hassan Kalimah Shamsid-Deen was born on January 26, 1976, in Atlanta, Georgia. He played high school football at Ronald E. McNair High School in Atlanta as a cornerback and tailback. He also participated in track in high school.

== College career ==
Shamsid-Deen was a three-year letterman for the NC State Wolfpack of North Carolina State University from 1995 to 1997. He was redshirted in 1994. He led the team in interceptions all three seasons, with two in 1995, four in 1996, and four in 1997. Shamsid-Deen announced that he would forgo his final year of eligibility to enter the 1999 NFL draft. However, he was benched during the final game of the 1997 season after giving up three touchdowns. He later graduated from NC State with a sociology degree.

== Professional career ==
After going undrafted, Shamsid-Deen signed with the Buffalo Bills in April 1998. He was released on August 25, 1998.

Shamsid-Deen was selected by the Scottish Claymores of NFL Europe in the 16th round of the 1999 draft. He was cut by the Claymores on April 4, 1999.

Shamsid-Deen signed with the Winnipeg Blue Bombers of the Canadian Football League in early May 1999. On June 18, 1999, it was reported that Shamsid-Deen suffered a quadriceps injury. He was released in late June 1999.

Shamsid-Deen joined the Grand Rapids Rampage of the Arena Football League (AFL) late in the 1999 season. He played in the final two games of the season, recording seven solo tackles, 13 assisted tackles, one forced fumble, two pass breakups, and five receptions for 44 yards. He also appeared in the team's playoff loss to the Albany Firebirds. Shamsid-Deen appeared in 13 games for the Rampage in 2000, totaling 31 solo tackles, 15 assisted tackles, four interceptions, 17 pass breakups, one fumble recovery, and three kick returns for 66 yards. He re-signed with the Rampage on October 30, 2000.

On October 30, 2000, Shamsid-Deen was also selected by the Orlando Rage in the 51st round, with the 404th overall pick, of the XFL draft. He suffered a separated shoulder in the opening scramble prior to the Rage's 33–29 season-opening win over the Chicago Enforcers on February 3, 2001. He was moved to the practice squad on February 20. Overall, he played in eight games for the Rage in 2001.

Shamsid-Deen, who had previously already signed with the Rampage, played in seven games for them during the 2001 season, accumulating 16 solo tackles, eight assisted tackles, six pass breakups, one forced fumble, and two kick returns for 48 yards. On August 19, 2001, the Rampage beat the Nashville Kats in ArenaBowl XV by a score of 64–42.

On December 5, 2001, Shamsid-Deen was selected by the Dallas Desperados of the AFL in an expansion draft. He signed with the team on January 29, 2002. He played in eight games for the Desperados in 2002, recording 40 solo tackles, eight assisted tackles, five interceptions, 12 pass breakups, one fumble recovery, and 16 kick returns for 244 yards. Shamsid-Deen was placed on injured reserve on June 11, 2002.

== Personal life ==
Shamsid-Deen's brother Muhammad Shamsid-Deen also played football.
