= Muhammad Shamsid-Deen =

American gridiron football player (born 1969)

Profile
- Position: Running back

Personal information
- Born: January 16, 1969 (age 57); Anderson, South Carolina, U.S.
- Listed height: 5 ft 11 in (1.80 m)
- Listed weight: 200 lb (91 kg)

Career information
- High school: McNair (DeKalb County, Georgia)
- College: Chattanooga
- NFL draft: 1992: 8th round, 207th overall pick

Career history
- Seattle Seahawks (1992–1994)*; Toronto Argonauts (1994)
- * Offseason or practice squad member only

Career CFL statistics
- Games played: 6
- Rushing yards: 333
- Touchdowns: 8

Muhammad Shamsid-Deen (born January 16, 1969) is an American former professional football player who was a running back . He played college football for the Chattanooga Mocs and was selected by the Seattle Seahawks of the National Football League (NFL) in the eighth round of the 1992 NFL draft with the 207th overall pick. Shamsid-Deen was released from the Seahawks on August 31, 1992, but then later signed to the practice squad. After spending the 1992 and 1993 on the Seahawks practice squad, Shamsid-Deen signed to play for the Toronto Argonauts of the Canadian Football League. His brother Hassan Shamsid-Deen also played football.
