= Germany Creek =

Stream in McDuffie County, Georgia, U.S.

Coordinates: 33°38′09″N 82°27′40″W

Germany Creek is a stream in McDuffie County in the U.S. state of Georgia. A variant name is "German Creek". It empties into Lake Strom Thurmond (Clarks Hill Lake) adjacent to the community of Raysville.

Some think Germany Creek bears the surname of a pioneer settler, while others believe a large share of the first settlers being German Quakers caused the name to be selected. Property ownership in the area by the Germany family (see brothers Samuel, "Irish" John Germany, Sons of Liberty) is verified by deeds and wills naming the property. The Quaker settlers were not German but had settled in Georgia from their previous home in NC,.
