= Snapping Shoals Creek =

Stream in Georgia, U.S.

Coordinates: 33°29′9.42″N 83°57′1.57″W

Snapping Shoals Creek is a stream in the U.S. state of Georgia. It is a tributary to the South River.

Some say Snapping Shoals Creek was so named for fish which could be easily caught or "snapped" at a shoal, while others believe the swift river current caused this name to be selected. Variant names are "Shoals Creek" and "Snapping Shoal Creek".
