= Raysville, Georgia =

Unincorporated community in Georgia, U.S.

Coordinates: 33°37′08″N 82°28′54″W

Raysville is an unincorporated community in McDuffie County, in the U.S. state of Georgia. The community is on a peninsula jutting into Lake Strom Thurmond (Clarks Hill Lake) between Big Creek and Germany Creek arms of the lake. Georgia Route 43 passes through the community.

== History ==
A post office called Raysville was established in 1894, and remained in operation until 1908. The community was named after Joseph Ray, a pioneer settler.
