= Charlie Elliott Wildlife Center =

- Interactive map of Charlie Elliott Wildlife Center
- Coordinates: 33°27′40.2804″N 83°43′54.3396″W
- Country: United States
- State: Georgia
- County: Newton and Jasper Counties, Georgia

Area
  - Total: 10 sq mi (26 km^{2})
  - Land: 6,400 acres (2,600 ha)
  - Water: 0.46 sq mi (1.2 km^{2})
- Elevation: 761 ft (232 m)
- Time zone: UTC-5 (Eastern (EST))
  - Summer (DST): UTC-4 (EDT)

Charlie Elliot Wildlife Center is a nature preserve located near Mansfield, Georgia, United States. Named after Charles Newton Elliott (1906–2000), the nature preserve has 6,400 acres (26 km^{2}) of forests, lakes, and fields, which are managed by Georgia Department of Natural Resources. The Wildlife Center includes Marben Public Fishing area, the Charlie Elliott Conference Center and Banquet Hall, Visitors' Center and Museum, and Clybel Wildlife Management Area.

== Activities ==
The Wildlife Center offers a range of activities, including hunting, fishing, picnicking, biking trails, walking trails, horse back riding, archery range, shooting range, and educational programs.

=== Fishing ===
Marben Public Fishing Area, named after Margery and Bennet O'Boyle, is part of Charlie Elliott Wildlife Center. The fishing area has 22 lakes and ponds. Some species of fish you may catch are Bluegill, Crappie, Largemouth Bass, Channel Catfish, and Redear Sunfish. The lakes range in size from 1-acre (4,000 m^{2}) to 96 acres (390,000 m^{2}). In all, the ponds and lakes add up to 295 acres (1.19 km^{2}).

=== Hiking ===
Hiking is available on several trails including Granite Outcrop (1.1 miles), Clubhouse Trail (1.5 miles), Murder Creek Trail (0.9 miles), Pigeon/Green House Trail (1.0 miles).

=== Hunting ===
Clybel Wildlife Management Area is mostly forest and fields inside Charlie Elliott Wildlife Center. Game which can be hunted there include white-tailed deer, wild turkey, and some small game animals. Management practices which are utilized to benefit multiple animal species include mowing, prescribed burning, timber harvesting, and food plot rotation.

== See also ==
- List of nature centers in the United States
