= Glenwood Park =

Mixed-use neighborhood in Atlanta, Georgia

Coordinates: 33.7394°N 84.3567°W

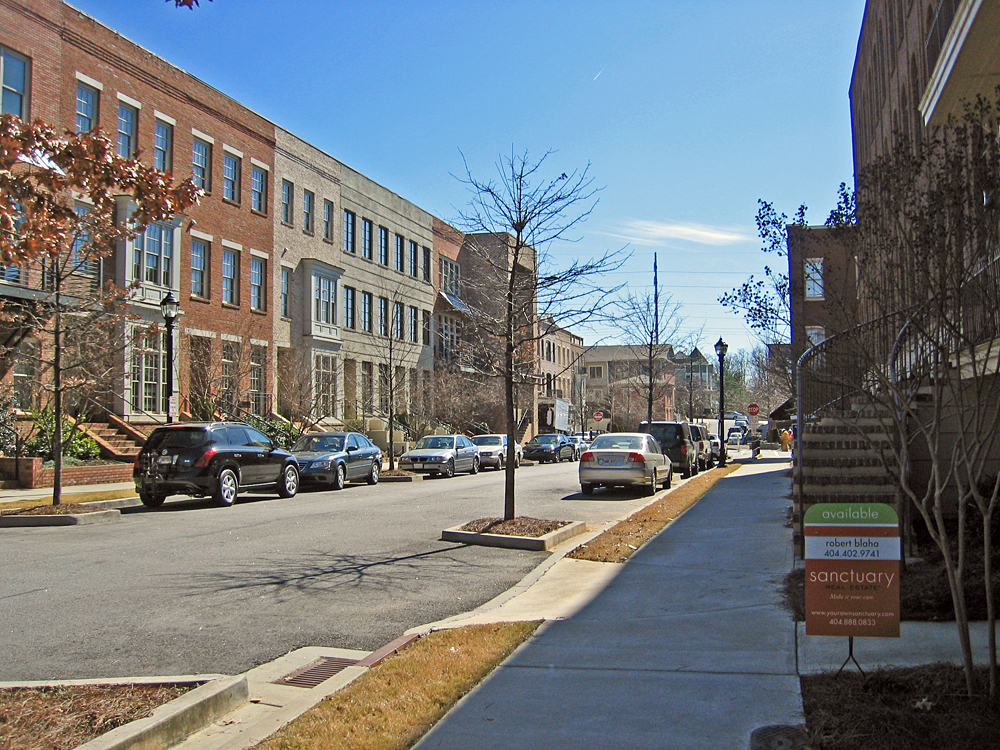
Multifamily Street Glenwood park

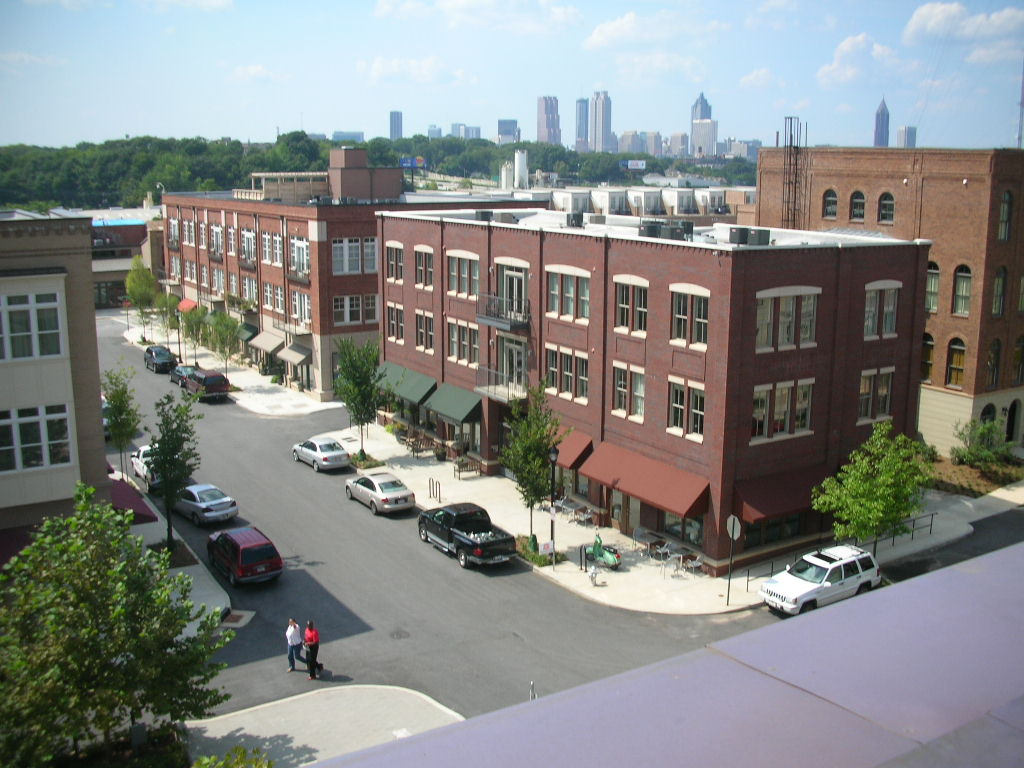
Glenwood Park, with the Atlanta skyline in background

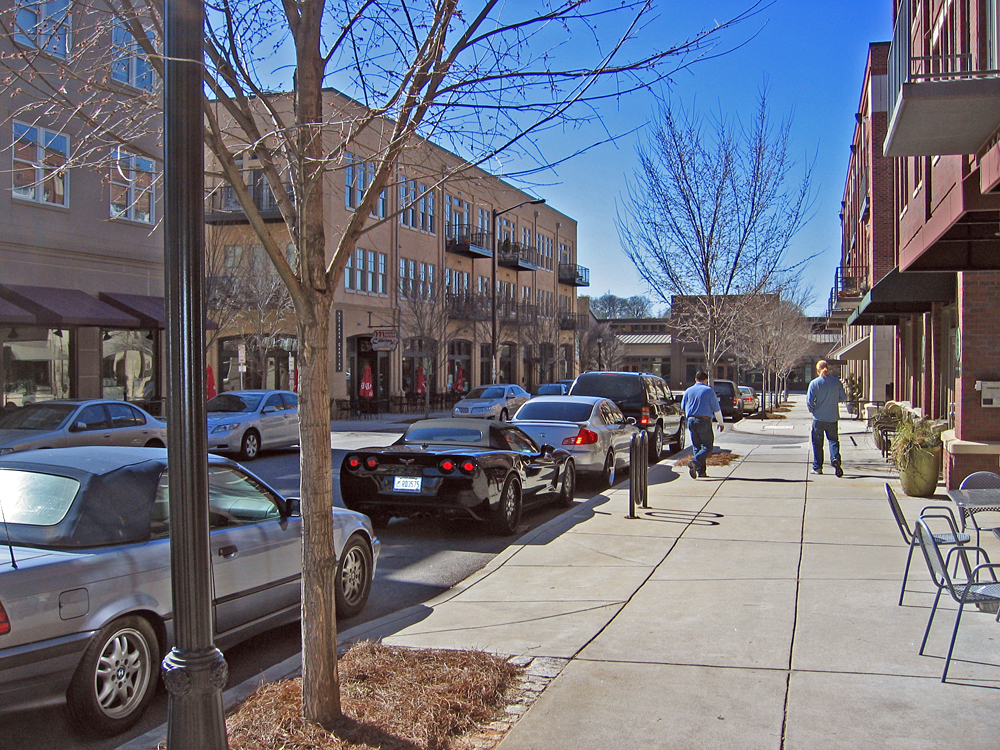
Mainstreet in Glenwood Park

Glenwood Park is a mixed-use neighborhood on the east side of Atlanta, Georgia, United States, located just west of North Ormewood Park. The neighborhood is an example of New Urbanism, promoting a sense of community with walkable streets and closely spaced residential units that are mixed in with office, retail, and green space. Glenwood Park is on the BeltLine, a former rail line converted to a trail.
