= North Ormewood Park =

Neighborhood of Atlanta, Georgia

Coordinates: 33.74205°N 84.3524°W

North Ormewood Park is a neighborhood on the east side of Atlanta, Georgia, United States, located in the northern part of Ormewood Park. It is located between Reynoldstown, East Atlanta and Grant Park and adjacent to the mixed-use development Glenwood Park. It is bordered by Moreland Avenue, Glenwood Avenue, I-20 and Stovall Avenue. It is a designated Drug Free Commercial Zone.

== History ==
Until 1821, the area was the territory of the Creek Indian Nation. After the US Civil War much of the land was used for dairy and pecan farming. The neighborhood received extensive damage during the 2008 Atlanta tornado. The North Ormewood Park Community Association (NOPCA) is the neighborhood association. NOPCA is a member of SAND. NOPCA is an active neighborhood association that has monthly meetings, a softball team, public safety and land use advocacy committees.
