= Dried Indian Creek =

Stream in Georgia, U.S.

Coordinates: 33°31′34″N 83°53′06″W

Dried Indian Creek is a stream in the U.S. state of Georgia. It is a tributary to the Yellow River.

According to tradition, Dried Indian Creek was named from an incident when the dried-up corpse of an Indian was discovered near its course.
