= Snapfinger Creek =

Stream in DeKalb County, Georgia, U.S.

Coordinates: 33°39′39.39″N 84°12′30.71″W

Snapfinger Creek is a stream in DeKalb County, Georgia. Another DeKalb waterway, Barbashela Creek, flows into Snapfinger, which flows into the South River.

Some say Snapfinger Creek was so named because it is a tributary or "finger," while others believe an incident in which a surveyor broke or "snapped" his finger bone while crossing the creek caused this name to be selected.
