= Panthersville, Georgia =

- Unincorporated community Census-designated place
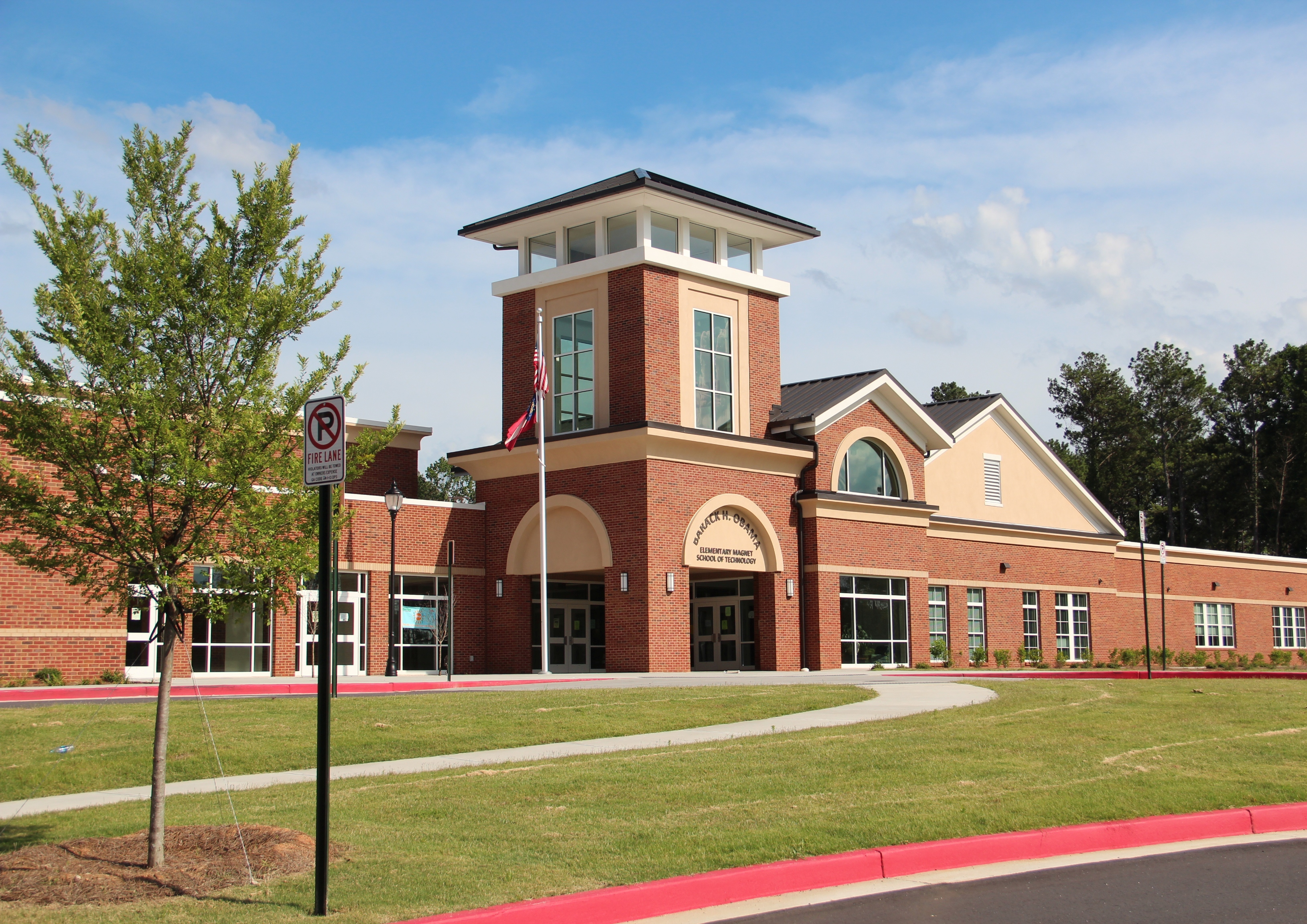
- The Barack H. Obama Elementary Magnet School of Technology in Panthersville

- Location in DeKalb County and the state of Georgia

- location in Metro Atlanta
- Coordinates: 33°42′20″N 84°16′43″W
- Country: United States
- State: Georgia
- County: DeKalb

Area
  - Total: 3.69 sq mi (9.55 km^{2})
  - Land: 3.67 sq mi (9.50 km^{2})
  - Water: 0.019 sq mi (0.05 km^{2})
- Elevation: 889 ft (271 m)

Population (2020)
  - Total: 11,237
  - Density: 3,064.3/sq mi (1,183.14/km^{2})
- Time zone: UTC-5 (Eastern (EST))
  - Summer (DST): UTC-4 (EDT)
- FIPS code: 13-59080
- GNIS feature ID: 0332600

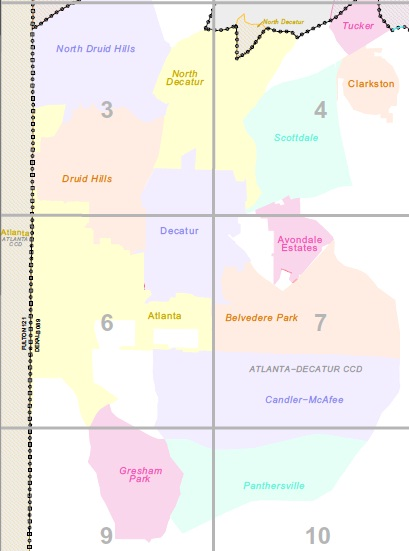
CDPs bordering eastern Atlanta

Panthersville is an unincorporated community and census-designated place (CDP) in DeKalb County, Georgia, United States. The population was 11,237 in 2020, up from 9,749 in 2010.

== History ==
The community most likely was named after a Cherokee Indian subtribe.

== Geography ==
Panthersville is located at 33°42′20″N 84°16′43″W (33.705639, -84.278551). The Candler-McAfee CDP is to the north and Gresham Park CDP is to the west.

According to the United States Census Bureau, the CDP has a total area of 3.7 square miles (9.6 km^{2}), of which 0.27% is water.

== Demographics ==
Historical population
Census	Pop.	Note	%±
1980	11,366		—
1990	9,874		−13.1%
2000	11,791		19.4%
2010	9,749		−17.3%
2020	11,237		15.3%
U.S. Decennial Census; 1850-1870 1870-1880; 1890-1910 1920-1930; 1940 1950 1960; 1970 1980 1990; 2000 2010 2020

Panthersville was first listed as a census designated place in the 1980 U.S. census.

=== Racial and ethnic composition ===
Panthersville CDP, Georgia – Racial and ethnic composition Note: the US Census treats Hispanic/Latino as an ethnic category. This table excludes Latinos from the racial categories and assigns them to a separate category. Hispanics/Latinos may be of any race.
Race / Ethnicity (NH = Non-Hispanic)	Pop 2000	Pop 2010	Pop 2020	% 2000	% 2010	% 2020
White alone (NH)	215	148	359	1.82%	1.52%	3.19%
Black or African American alone (NH)	11,275	9,357	10,197	95.62%	95.98%	90.74%
Native American or Alaska Native alone (NH)	15	10	21	0.13%	0.10%	0.19%
Asian alone (NH)	24	25	57	0.20%	0.26%	0.51%
Native Hawaiian or Pacific Islander alone (NH)	6	1	4	0.05%	0.01%	0.04%
Other race alone (NH)	10	11	40	0.08%	0.11%	0.36%
Mixed race or Multiracial (NH)	106	91	254	0.90%	0.93%	2.26%
Hispanic or Latino (any race)	140	106	305	1.19%	1.09%	2.71%
Total	11,791	9,749	11,237	100.00%	100.00%	100.00%

=== 2020 census ===
As of the 2020 census, Panthersville had a population of 11,237. The median age was 36.0 years. 21.9% of residents were under the age of 18 and 15.5% of residents were 65 years of age or older. For every 100 females there were 83.9 males, and for every 100 females age 18 and over there were 79.6 males age 18 and over.

100.0% of residents lived in urban areas, while 0.0% lived in rural areas.

There were 4,537 households in Panthersville, including 2,251 family households, and 29.0% of households had children under the age of 18 living in them. Of all households, 21.1% were married-couple households, 22.9% were households with a male householder and no spouse or partner present, and 47.7% were households with a female householder and no spouse or partner present. About 32.5% of all households were made up of individuals, and 11.1% had someone living alone who was 65 years of age or older.

There were 5,306 housing units, of which 14.5% were vacant. The homeowner vacancy rate was 3.4% and the rental vacancy rate was 9.6%.

== Economy ==
Panthersville is home to the Gallery at South DeKalb, formerly South DeKalb Mall, a regional shopping center with a Macy's (former Rich's) department store. The former JC Penney now houses independent stores.

The CDP is the headquarters for the Georgia Bureau of Investigation, and for Georgia Regional Hospital state psychiatric ward.

== Education ==
The CDP is incorporated within the DeKalb County Public Schools zone:

- Elementary schools: Barack H. Obama EMST (in the CDP), Flat Shoals (in the CDP), and Columbia (outside of the CDP)
- Middle schools: Ronald E. McNair (most) and Columbia (some) (outside of the CDP)
- High schools: Ronald E. McNair High School (most) and Columbia High School (some) (both outside of the CDP)
