= McNair High School (Georgia) =

Public school in DeKalb County, Georgia, United States

Ronald E. McNair High School

Location
- 1804 Bouldercrest Road SE; Atlanta, Georgia 30316; United States; 33°42′19″N 84°19′33″W

Information
- Type: Public high school
- Motto: "We Can and We Will Because We Must!"
- School district: DeKalb County School System
- Principal: Loukisha Walker
- Teaching staff: 47.50 (FTE)
- Grades: 9 - 12
- Enrollment: 776 (2023-2024)
- Student to teacher ratio: 16.34
- Colors: Red, grey, and white
- Nickname: Mustangs
- Website: School website
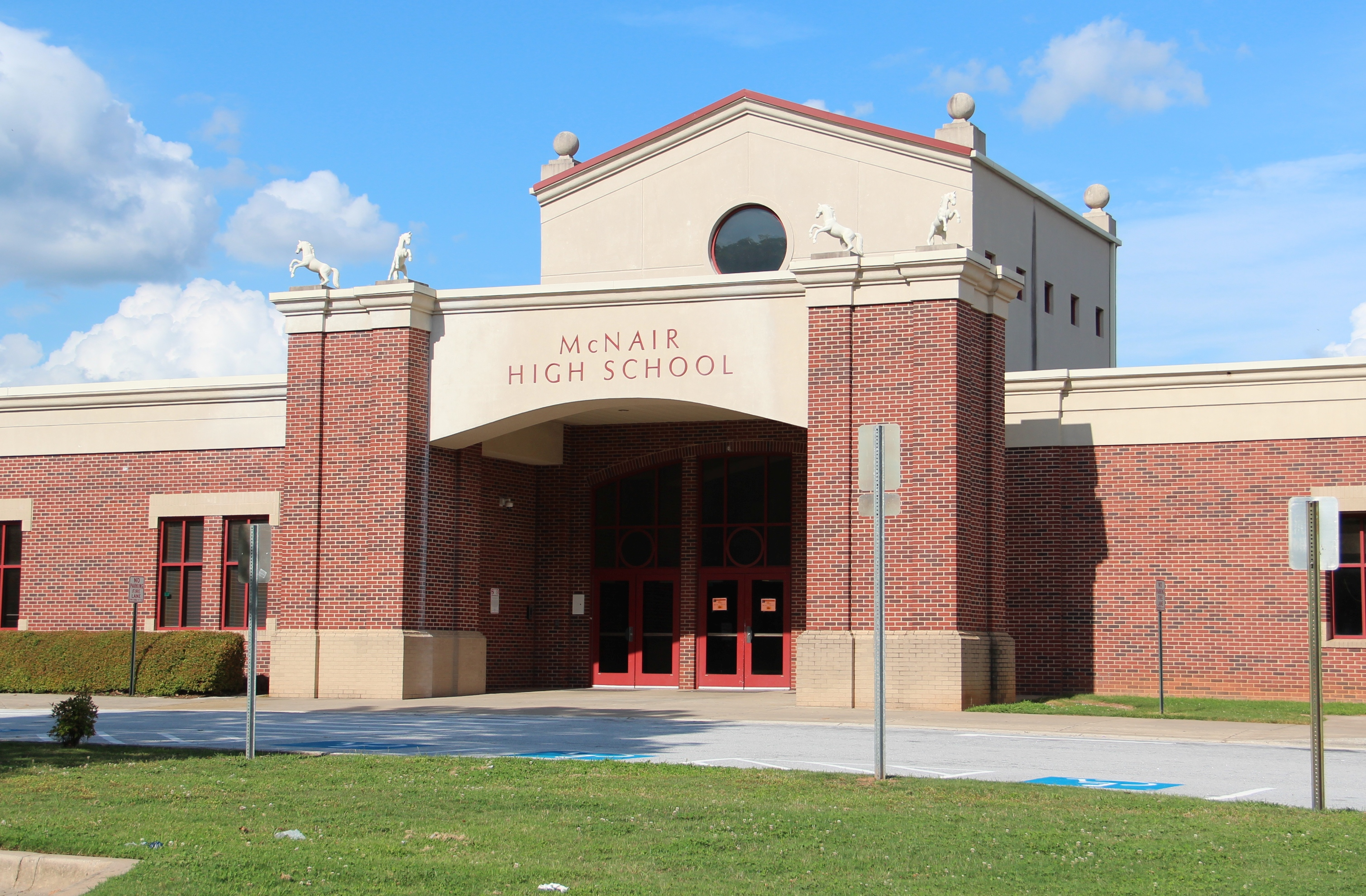

Ronald E. McNair High School is a public school in unincorporated DeKalb County, Georgia, United States, located at 1804 Bouldercrest Road SE, Atlanta, GA 30316. It is in the Gresham Park census-designated place, southeast of Atlanta. The school was originally named Walker High School, but was renamed to McNair High School in 1987.

== History ==
The school was built in 1964 and originally named after Confederate Civil War Major General William H.T. Walker. Walker was born in Augusta, Georgia, and died two miles north of the school during the Battle of Atlanta. There is a monument at the site of his death on the corner of Glenwood Avenue and Wilkinson Drive. Some of the last remaining Confederate fortifications in Grant Park (about three miles away from the school) were renamed Fort Walker in his honor.

Walker High School was a "full five year" senior level high school, with the first graduating class, including 8th through 12th grades, in 1969. Classes were first attended in the fall of 1966. The class of 1969 attended Gordon High School using "split sessions" in 1964. Students graduating in 1967 were the first Walker High School graduating class. The students were from other schools that were in overflow, such as Gordon High School, and Southwest DeKalb High School. The first class attending Walker High School from 8th grade to graduation (12th grade) was the class of 1970 (335 graduates). Walker averaged about 3,500 students total, from 1967 to 1980, with graduating classes of about 350 to 400 students per year.

The first annual was called The Astur and was first printed in 1966. The school paper was The Talon and the school's colors were crimson and silver. The school's alumni from 1967 to 1987 were known as the "Walker Warhawks" and won state championships in baseball (1968), wrestling (1967 - 1971), and track and field. Their mascot was Thor, a red-tailed hawk that lived in a 20 by 40 foot cage inside the senior courtyard for about two years. The courtyard was an open area in the center of the school and was for graduating seniors only. Thor accidentally froze to death in late 1968.

Walker High School had a baseball, football, wrestling, soccer and track field. The baseball field and track were used for competitive sports. Panthersville Stadium was used for all football and soccer home games, and Columbia High School's swimming pool was used as Walker's "home" pool. Basketball was played in the school's gym.

=== Change of name ===
During the mid-to-late 1980s, the area surrounding Walker High School went from predominantly white middle-class neighborhoods to predominantly black middle-class neighborhoods. Since Walker was named after a Confederate Civil War General, it was deemed appropriate to rename the school. It was renamed McNair High School in 1987 (there are two McNair High Schools and two McNair Middle Schools in Atlanta) after the black astronaut Ronald E. McNair, who died in the explosion of the Space Shuttle Challenger on January 28, 1986. The school colors and mascots were changed from the crimson and silver Walker Warhawks to the red and silver McNair Mustangs.

== Attendance boundary ==
The school serves: portions of the Candler-McAfee, and Panthersville CDPs.

== Notable alumni ==
=== Athletics ===
- Mike Ivie (Class of 1970) baseball catcher with MLB San Diego Padres, San Francisco Giants, Houston Astros, Detroit Tigers
- David Whitehurst (Class of 1973), NFL quarterback with Green Bay Packers, Kansas City Chiefs
- Mark Strickland (class of 1988) NBA forward
- Robert Mathis (Class of 1999) outside linebacker for the Indianapolis Colts
- Christian Holmes (class of 2015) NFL cornerback with the Washington Commanders

=== Government ===
- Paul Douglas Hale (Class of 1979, transfer 1978 GED) 2020 Federal Elections Commission Registered Candidate, Announced 2008

=== Business ===
- Dean Alford (Class of 1971), politician and businessman

=== Science and engineering ===
- Anthony J. "Bo" Arduengo (Class of 1970), chemist; professor at the University of Alabama and the Braunschweig University of Technology
- Kurt Jackson (Class of 1978), lead engineer at NASA in Huntsville, AL

=== Military ===
- Roger Fortson (Class of 2019), United States Air Force member, murder victim of police brutality

=== Music and the arts ===
- Wayne Ean Evans (Class of 1978), musician, songwriter, former Lynyrd Skynyrd bass guitar player
- Rich Homie Quan rapper, songwriter
- Gucci Mane (Class of 1998) rapper, songwriter
- Young Nudy rapper, songwriter
- YC, rapper
- Joel Wheelus (Class of 1978) Martial Arts Instructor (Nihon Goshin Aikido)
