= Candler-McAfee, Georgia =

Candler-McAfee, Atlanta
- Unincorporated community Census-designated place
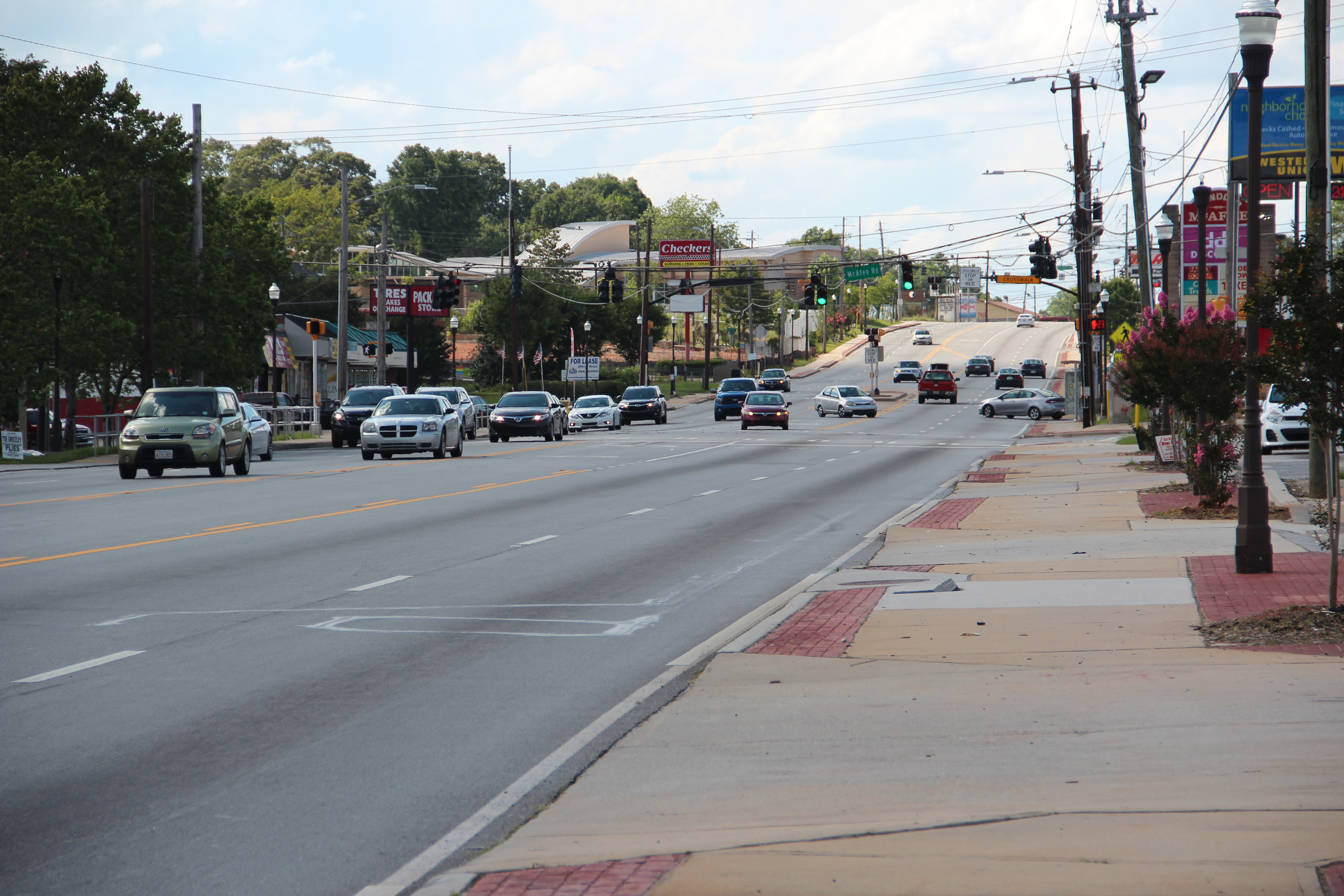
- Georgia State Route 155 in Candler-McAfee

- Location in DeKalb County and the state of Georgia

- Location in Atlanta, GA
- Coordinates: 33°43′38″N 84°16′29″W
- Country: United States
- State: Georgia
- County: DeKalb

Area
  - Total: 6.98 sq mi (18.08 km^{2})
  - Land: 6.97 sq mi (18.04 km^{2})
  - Water: 0.015 sq mi (0.04 km^{2})

Population (2020)
  - Total: 22,468
  - Density: 3,226.5/sq mi (1,245.77/km^{2})
- Time zone: UTC-5 (Eastern (EST))
  - Summer (DST): UTC-4 (EDT)
- ZIP code: 30032
- FIPS code: 13-12834

Candler-McAfee neighborhood on the east side of Atlanta, Georgia, United States approximately 10 miles (16 km) east of Downtown Atlanta and to the south of Decatur, Georgia The population was 22,468 in 2020.

== Geography ==
Candler-McAfee is located to the eastside of Atlanta, Georgia and is bounded by:

- Glenwood Avenue
- 2nd Avenue
- East Lake
- East Atlanta
- South: I-20
- East: I-285

The Belvedere Park CDP is to the north and Panthersville CDP is to the south.

According to the United States Census Bureau, the CDP has a total area of 7.0 square miles (18 km^{2}), of which 0.04 square miles (0.10 km^{2}), or 0.29%, is water.

East Lake Golf Club is on the northern boundary of Candler-McAfee.

== Education ==
It is in the DeKalb County Public Schools. Zoned schools:

- Elementary schools: Columbia, Kelley Lake, Ronald E. McNair, Snapfinger, and Toney (all in the CDP)
- Middle schools: Ronald E. McNair (in the CDP) and Columbia (outside the CDP)
- High schools: Columbia High School (in the CDP) and Ronald E. McNair High School (outside the CDP).

The Roman Catholic Archdiocese of Atlanta operates area Catholic schools. The K-8 school St. Peter Claver Regional School is in Candler-McAfee.

== Demographics ==
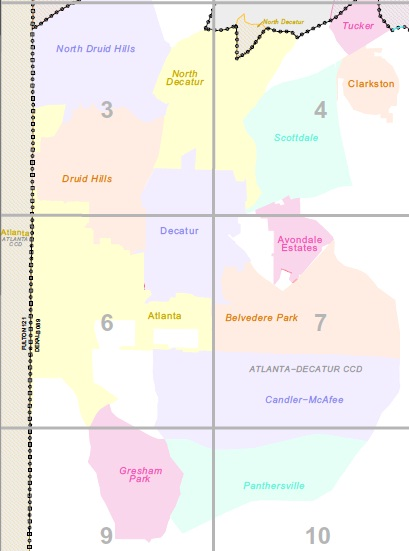
CDPs bordering eastern Atlanta

Historical population
Census	Pop.	Note	%±
1980	27,306		—
1990	29,491		8.0%
2000	28,294		−4.1%
2010	23,025		−18.6%
2020	22,468		−2.4%
U.S. Decennial Census; 1850-1870 1870-1880; 1890-1910 1920-1930; 1940 1950 1960; 1970 1980 1990; 2000 2010 2020

Candler-McAfee was first listed as a CDP in the 1980 U.S. census.

=== Racial and ethnic composition ===
Candler-McAfee, Georgia – Racial and ethnic composition Note: the US Census treats Hispanic/Latino as an ethnic category. This table excludes Latinos from the racial categories and assigns them to a separate category. Hispanics/Latinos may be of any race.
Race / Ethnicity (NH = Non-Hispanic)	Pop 2000	Pop 2010	Pop 2020	% 2000	% 2010	% 2020
White alone (NH)	888	1,399	2,839	3.14%	6.08%	12.64%
Black or African American alone (NH)	26,802	20,926	17,999	94.73%	90.88%	80.11%
Native American or Alaska Native alone (NH)	55	59	32	0.19%	0.26%	0.14%
Asian alone (NH)	41	47	116	0.14%	0.20%	0.52%
Native Hawaiian or Pacific Islander alone (NH)	2	6	7	0.01%	0.03%	0.03%
Other race alone (NH)	49	26	140	0.17%	0.11%	0.62%
Mixed race or Multiracial (NH)	193	259	643	0.68%	1.12%	2.86%
Hispanic or Latino (any race)	264	303	692	0.93%	1.32%	3.08%
Total	28,294	23,025	22,468	100.00%	100.00%	100.00%

=== 2020 census ===
As of the 2020 census, Candler-McAfee had a population of 22,468 and contained 5,191 families. The median age was 39.9 years. 17.9% of residents were under the age of 18 and 20.7% of residents were 65 years of age or older. For every 100 females there were 86.0 males, and for every 100 females age 18 and over there were 83.4 males age 18 and over.

100.0% of residents lived in urban areas, while 0.0% lived in rural areas.

There were 8,974 households in Candler-McAfee, of which 24.1% had children under the age of 18 living in them. Of all households, 25.8% were married-couple households, 22.1% were households with a male householder and no spouse or partner present, and 44.2% were households with a female householder and no spouse or partner present. About 30.7% of all households were made up of individuals and 12.4% had someone living alone who was 65 years of age or older.

There were 10,136 housing units, of which 11.5% were vacant. The homeowner vacancy rate was 3.6% and the rental vacancy rate was 9.0%.

Racial composition as of the 2020 census
Race	Number	Percent
White	2,942	13.1%
Black or African American	18,127	80.7%
American Indian and Alaska Native	48	0.2%
Asian	124	0.6%
Native Hawaiian and Other Pacific Islander	7	0.0%
Some other race	326	1.5%
Two or more races	894	4.0%
