= U.S. Route 129 in Georgia =

Segment of American highway

U.S. Highway 129
- US 129 highlighted in red

Route information
- Auxiliary route of US 29
- Maintained by GDOT
- Length: 377.8 mi (608.0 km)
- Existed: 1926–present

Major junctions
- South end: US 129 / SR 100 / SR 11 at the Florida state line south of Statenville
- I-16 / SR 540 in Macon; US 441 / SR 24 / SR 44 in Eatonton; I-20 in Madison; US 29 / US 78 / US 441 / SR 8 / SR 10 / SR 15 in Athens; I-85 in Jefferson; I-985 / US 23 / SR 365 in Gainesville; US 19 / SR 9 northwest of Cleveland
- North end: US 19 / US 129 and SR 11 at the North Carolina state line northwest of Blairsville

Location
- Country: United States
- State: Georgia
- Counties: Echols, Lanier, Berrien, Irwin, Ben Hill, Wilcox, Pulaski, Houston, Peach, Bibb, Jones, Putnam, Morgan, Oconee, Clarke, Jackson, Hall, White, Lumpkin, Union

Highway system
- United States Numbered Highway System; List; Special; Divided; Georgia State Highway System; Interstate; US; State; Special
← SR 128	→ SR 129
← US 11	SR 11	→ SR 12
← SR 246	SR 247	→ SR 248
← SR 43	SR 44	→ SR 45
← US 23	SR 24	→ US 25
← SR 14	SR 15	→ I-16

U.S. Route 129 (US 129) is a 377.8-mile-long (608.0 km) U.S. Highway in the U.S. state of Georgia. It travels south-to-north from the Florida state line, south of Statenville, to the North Carolina state line, northwest of Blairsville.

US 129 is signed concurrently with various state highways. Most of the highway is concurrent with State Route 11 (SR 11) at both the southern and northern terminus as well as in central part of the state. However, north of Hawkinsville, and into southern Macon, the highway travels along SR 247. Within Macon itself, it travels along parts of SR 87, and later SR 49, and from Macon to Gray, it also travels along SR 22. Between Gray and Eatonton, it travels along SR 44, to the Watkinsville area along Georgia State Route 24, SR 15 Alternate from Athens to Arcade, SR 11 Connector between Arcade and Jefferson, SR 365 and then SR 369 southeast of Gainesville, and SR 180 within the Chattahoochee-Oconee National Forest

Concurrencies with U.S. Highways include US 221 through the Lakeland area, US 82 through the Alapaha area, US 319 from Ocilla to Fitzgerald, US 341 through the Hawkinsville vicinity, US 41 north of Sofkee into southern Macon, US 41 Business in Macon, US 80 in Macon, US 23 in Macon, US 441 from Eatonton to Athens, US 278 near Madison, US 29 and US 78 in Athens, US 23 again in Gainesville (unsigned with Interstate 985) and US 19 from Turners Corner through the North Carolina state line to Topton.

== Route description ==
=== Florida State Line through Ray City ===
U.S. Route 129 begins at the Florida state line south of Statenville at the northwestern terminus of Florida State Road 100. The first intersection within the state is a local dirt road named Strickland Road. The route travels north concurrent with SR 11, and the rural surroundings that were found in northern Florida continue into Georgia. Aside from farmhouses and the fields they reside in, very little resemblance to development can be found until the routes reach downtown. A bi-directional connecting ramp can be found on the southwest corner of the intersection with Georgia State Route 94, while the county court house is on the southeast corner. Not long after this intersection, US 129 descends over the wetlands of Troublesome Creek, and curves to the northeast and re-enters farmland again. At a pair of farm fields, the road curves almost straight north. Along the way, the routes enter the community of Mayday and serves as the western terminus of Georgia State Route 187, whose intersection is shared by a local street named Norman Eva Road. Besides farms, forests and the occasional church, this segment of US 129/SR 11 passes over bridges for Cow Creek, and later Reedy Creek. The routes enter Stockton in the vicinity of Wayne Jones Honey Farm, but then approaches a railroad crossing with a CSX (formerly Atlantic Coast Line Railroad) line just before the eastbound lanes of US 84/SR 38. Shortly after this, it approaches the westbound lanes of US 84/SR 38, which has turning ramps on the northeast and northwest corners. Eventually leaving the city limits, they continue to run straight northeast until the intersection with Bennett Road, where the routes turn northwest, and even more so north of the intersection with Brantley Road. Just before the intersection with Georgia State Route 37C, the routes turn straight north again, only for the street to end at a "T" intersection with Georgia State Route 37, then turns west along SR 37, and encounters the northern terminus of SR 37C, and almost immediately has a wrong way concurrency with U.S. Route 221, which is also shared by State Routes 31 and 122. US 129/221/SRs 11/31/37/122 cross the Captain Henry Will Jones Bridge over the Alapaha River, then crosses another bridge over a tributary to that river named "Big Creek" where it officially enters Lakeland. For such a small city, Lakeland hosts a large cluster of US and state highways, many of which intersect or overlap US 129/11. The first one is North College Street, which serves as the southern (eastern) terminus of Georgia State Route 11 Bypass and the southern terminus of a concurrency with Georgia State Route 135 Bypass. Just two blocks later the wrong-way concurrency with SR 135 Bypass ends when that route makes a left turn onto Oak Street going south. Five blocks after this it has another concurrency with Georgia State Route 135 to the right on North Carter Street, and a mere 121 feet later turns south in the opposite direction on South Valdosta Road, along with southbound US 221. A block and a half later, SR 122 branches off at a fork in the road to the southwest towards Thomasville, while US 129/SRs 11/37 branches off to the northwest. The last group of routes are the northern terminus of Georgia Connecting Route 11 at North Pecan Street and the northern (western) terminus of SR 11 Bypass at West Church Avenue. West of the city limits, one last state route can be found in the county, specifically, the Georgia State Route 122 Connector. All other intersections along US 129/SRs 11/37 are local streets or county roads. Just after the routes cross the Lanier-Berrien County Line, they intersect Johnson Street Extension, and Myers Road, then runs through the forestland surrounding Beaverdam Creek before eventually entering Ray City, where it becomes Main Street, curves almost straight west, and serves as the southwestern terminus of Georgia State Route 64. After a railroad crossing, the concurrency with Georgia State Route 37 ends as US 129/SR 11 starts curving to the north and is joined by another concurrency, this time with Georgia State Route 125.

=== Ray City through Pineview ===
The road moves away from the tracks just before entering Nashville where it is given the name South Davis Street. After the intersection with South Jefferson Street, it curves to the right and runs straight north. Two blocks later, Georgia State Route 76 joins the concurrency with US 129/SR 11/125 at the intersection of Adel Highway and Hazel Avenue. A former section of SR 76 (Adel Highway) can be seen just north of that intersection on the west side as a dead-end street. A flood channel also runs under the road where the former intersection used to exist. Further downtown, US 129/SRs 11/76/125 encounter the western terminus of Georgia State Route 168 at East McPherson Avenue. Two blocks later at the NRHP-listed Berrien County Courthouse, the concurrency with Georgia State Route 76 comes to an end as it turns east onto East Marion Avenue, while at the same intersection the concurrency with Georgia State Route 125 comes to an end as it turns west onto West Marion Avenue. From that point US 129/SR 11 becomes North Davis Street and runs through the rest of the city until passing by the Berrien Primary School and later after the intersection with North Magnolia Drive. After leaving the city, the name of the street changes from North Davis Street to Main Street, despite having none of the typical characteristics of such a street name. Instead it serves as a rural two-lane roadway passing through mostly agricultural and forested lands. It is at the intersection of West Lenox Road, which runs southwest, and a private farm road that runs southeast that the routes enter Alapaha. The road runs north-northeast within the town, and a few blocks after the intersection with East Brunswick Street, passes through the former Atlantic Coast Line Railroad right-of-way that was converted into a town green, with the station converted into a firehouse. The road passes by the post office, then the Alapaha Baptist Church, and three blocks later, turns left at US 82/SR 520 (South Georgia Parkway). The concurrency leaves the town limits, and after a local farm supply store, US 129/SR 11 branches off to the northwest onto Alapaha Highway, while US 82 heads west to Albany, Georgetown, Montgomery, Alabama, and ultimately Alamogordo, New Mexico.

Meanwhile, US 129/SR 11 passes by some local farmland along with a dirt road, then after a cemetery enters some wetlands where it makes a slight curve to another northwest angle passing by a fish farm, then curves to the right before the intersection with Berrien County Road 246, then crosses the Captain Henry Will Jones Bridge over the Alapaha River and turns back to the northeast again. At the Berrien–Irwin County Line the road intersects the western terminus of Georgia State Route 158, then north of Tulip Road (Irwin CR 80) crosses a bridge over Reedy Creek. It then turns to the north-northwest between Green Road (Irwin CR 88) and Nash Lane (Irwin CR 265), then turns straight north at Hickory Road (Irwin CR 57). North of Cedar Grove Church Road (Irwin CR 246) the road enters the Ocilla City Limits. US 129/SR 11 curves slightly to the northeast before passing by the Irwin County Detention Center, then crosses a bridge over Stump Creek, and becoming Irwin Avenue as it turns straight north before approaching the intersection with Five Bridge Road and East Boulevard, the latter of which is where Georgia State Route 90 turns from west to north in a concurrency with US 129/SR 11. US 129/SRs 11/90 run north through a mostly residential area, where it passes the Ocilla-Irwin Chamber of Commerce, and north of that the historic Irwin County Courthouse between West First and West Second Street. US 319 and Georgia SR 32 are marked at Fourth Street, where northbound US 319 leaves its concurrency with eastbound SR 32 to join US 129.

South of Valdosta Lane, US 129/319/SRs 11/90 widens to four lanes with a center left-turn lane. The routes leave the city after the Ocilla Bethel Baptist Church. Between West Cargile and East Frank Roads, signs of an abandoned railroad crossing can be found. North of Aaron Drive, the road gets the name Fitzgerald Highway and serves as the location of sites such as the Ocilla Country Club, and then the Dill's Builder's Supply, but changes its name to Ocilla Highway after crossing a bridge over Willacoochee Creek, and shortly afterwards the Irwin-Ben Hill County Line. At Pine Level Church Road (Ben Hill CR 243), the routes curve from northeast to Northwest, and intersects Ed Ward Road, which leads to the Fitzgerald Municipal Airport and later the Turkey Creek Golf Course and Country Club. The routes officially enter the City of Fitzgerald at the intersection of Georgia State Route 107 where US 319 leaves the concurrency by turning right. North of there, US 129/SRs 11/90 pass through standard contemporary commercial zoning with fast food restaurants, shopping centers, and similar businesses as it crosses a railroad line and becomes Grant Street as it curves straight north, then splits into a one-way pair, when the northbound lanes shift onto Sherman Street. Between Cypress and Palm Streets, Sherman Street runs along the west side of Blue and Gray Park. Further downtown, both streets approach Central Avenue, a divided boulevard that provides a link between the northern terminus of Georgia State Route 125 and US 319. One block later, they cross level crossings with a former Atlantic Coast Line Railroad line. North of there, the roads run over flood channels at Chattahoochee Street. Though Grant Street remains straight north of East Ohoopee Street, Sherman Street turns to the northwest where SR 90 leaves the concurrency at West Sultana Drive, and Sherman Street becomes Wilson Avenue. The one-way pair ends as both roads curve to the northeast and becomes Bowens Mill Highway, although a local segment of Wilson Avenue resumes on the Grant Street side of this pair. After passing the Fitzgerald Nursing Home the road curves north again, cutting off a former segment of Bush Road and transforming into a frontage road between Jack Allen Road and Lower Rebecca/Joshlyn Road.

North of Fitzgerald, it runs through Queensland then curves to the right and passes through Bowens Mill where it serves as the western terminus of SR 182 and replaces the trajectory of that route running roughly parallel to the Ocmulgee River even as it crosses the Ben Hill-Wilcox County Line, passing a Georgia State Fish Hatchery. Continuing in relatively close proximity to the Ocmulgee the road eventually runs through Abbeville where the street becomes South Broad Street. A long driveway leads to the Wilcox Correctional Institute, then the road curves straight north as it crosses a bridge over a former Seaboard Air Line Railroad line. Four blocks later South Broad Street ends at US 280/SR 30 (Main Street) and the road becomes North Broad Street then curves back to the northwest at Cannonville Road. Curving less to the west, it skirts through the eastern edges of Pineview where Routes 129 and 11 serves as the northern terminus of Georgia State Route 233, and then a bridge over Cedar Creek, a tributary of the Ocmulgee River, followed by an overflow bridge. At Richland Church Road, the routes cross the Wilcox-Pulaski County Line where more farmland surrounds the road than woodland. The exception were the wetlands surrounding a bridge over Bluff Creek and another over Standley Creek. Farmland is reduced slightly but continues along this segment. An abandoned former section can be found on the east side of the road as it approaches the intersection with Georgia State Route 112, which joins US 129/SR 11 in a concurrency north of here.

=== Hawkinsville through Macon ===
After the intersection with Fire Tower Road US 129/SR 11/SR 112 enters the city limits of Hawkinsville, and instantly passes alongside of the Lawrence Bennett Harness Horse Racing Training track. Further into town Abbeville Highway becomes South Jackson Street. They travel along South Jackson Street as they approach US 341/SR 27/SR 230/SR 257, where US 129/SR 11 turns left. The same intersection is also the southern terminus of US 129 Alt., which heads east and US 129 Bus., which continues northbound onto Jackson Street, while the concurrency with SR 112 ends and joins US 129 Alt. The first sites along this segment are the city hall and historic Hawkinsville Opera House. SR 27/SR 257 turns southwest onto McCormick Avenue (Fire Road 600). After Wood Street, SR 230 continues to the west onto Broad Street while US 129/US 341 Truck/SR 11 takes a sharp turn to the northwest rejoining the Golden Isles Parkway. Three blocks later, the highways encounter the first major intersection, which is SR 26. Just after the culvert over Town Creek, US 129/US 341/SR 11 mainline leaves the Hawkinsville city limits, and US 129 Bus./US 341 Bus./SR 11 Bus. ends at these highways before the main road curves to the northwest and replaces the trajectory of the business routes. The end of the concurrency with US 341 and temporary end of the concurrency with SR 11 begins when US 129 turns north onto SR 247. US 129 travels concurrently with SR 247 as they enter Houston County, and later Bibb County before passing Middle Georgia Regional Airport a short distance south-southeast of an intersection with US 41/SR 11/SR 49. The five highways later travel through Rutland as they pass over a bridge for a former Central of Georgia Railway line, and then turn north again where they encounter an interchange with Houston Avenue, a former segment of US 41/SR 11/SR 49. From that point on, the street name along this concurrency is Houston Road. Later, the highways enter some marshland which includes bridges with Tobesofkee Creek and Rocky Creek before entering Macon, where it approaches a major intersection. US 41/SR 247 branches off to the northwest onto Pio Nono Avenue, Houston Road becomes Houston Avenue and continues straight ahead, and US 129/SR 11/SR 49 branches off to the northeast onto Broadway, this time accompanied by US 41 Bus.

US 41 Bus./US 129/SR 11/SR 49 continuously curve toward the northeast, traveling close to the same CofG line it crossed over in Rutland until it turns straight north between Estaville Avenue and Greter Street. At the intersection with US 80/SR 22 (Eisenhower Parkway) turns from east to north joining the concurrency, while Eisenhower Parkway itself continues as an unmarked and unfinished divided highway. After the intersection with Henry Street, the highway curves to the northeast. Houston Avenue ends across from Concord Street, and US 41 Bus./US 80/US 129/SR 11/SR 22/SR 49 is renamed Martin Luther King Jr. Boulevard. The highways travel under a railroad bridge for a former CofG line just south of Ash Street. Further downtown, they intersect a four-lane divided boulevard known as Poplar Street, which used to be where US 41 Bus. turned left to leave the concurrency, then curves to the right to encounter an intersection with Mulberry Street and Fifth Street, the former of which used to be where SR 49 turned left to leave the concurrency. Today, US 41 Bus./SR 22/SR 49 all turn west onto Walnut Street, then US 129/SR 11 crosses under the current and former bridge embankments for some former Southern Railway lines. US 80/SR 87 continues northbound to cross the Otis Redding Memorial Bridge, while US 129/SR 11/SR 87 makes a left turn onto Riverside Drive, joining northbound SR 87 and traveling under the same railroad bridge that it traveled under south of the intersection. The northwest corner of this intersection also contains the Charles H. Jones Gateway Park. Three blocks after this intersection, the road travels under the bridge for SR 22 (Second Street), which only includes access from a south to east loop ramp. Rotary Park can be found across from this loop. West of First Street, a vacant lot that may or may not be part of this park can also be found. The concurrency along Riverside Drive ends at Spring Street (SR 19/SR 49) when SR 87 continues straight northwest along US 23, while northbound US 129/SR 11 turn right along Spring Street (US 23), following the routes in a wrong-way concurrency. US 23/US 129/SR 11/SR 19/SR 49 then cross the W.L. "Young" Stribling Memorial Bridge (formerly known as the Spring Street Bridge) over the Ocmulgee River, which also includes the previously mentioned former Southern Railway line on the south side and the Ocmulgee Heritage Trail on the north side. Before approaching the interchange with I-16/SR 540, southbound US 23/SR 19 are channelized into separate lanes, along with the ramps for eastbound and westbound I-16. Northbound US 23/SR 19 (Emery Highway) join US 129/SR 11/SR 49 across from the south-to-westbound on-ramp to I-16. US 129 Alt. ends at US 129 at the intersection of Second Street, but SR 22 resumes its concurrency with US 129. Over several blocks later, SR 49 leaves the concurrency and turns east onto Shurling Drive.

=== Metro Macon through Athens ===
Still within Macon, US 129/SRs 11/22 changes from a four-lane undivided highway to a four-lane divided highway named Gray Highway. This continues even as it crosses the Bibb-Jones County Line, just north of the intersection with the southern terminus of Old Clinton Road a former segment of SR 11. That segment ends as Old Gray Highway across from Joycliff Road, and another one named Rock Cliff Road begins across from the intersection of Sand Creek Trail. After this one ends, another former SR 11 segment (Old Macon Road) begins north and across from that at the intersection of Greenwood Road. The north end of Old Macon Road and an entrance to a gated community called "Landfall at Porter" is where the routes enter Gray. From there the road curves more towards the east-northeast when it encounters the beginning of a short concurrency with Georgia State Route 18. A six-mile bypass is also under construction at this location. Closer to downtown Gray, the concurrency with SR 18 ends at Bill Conn Parkway across from Jackson Avenue. The divided highway ends in front of a Harvey's Supermarket, and the road becomes only three lanes wide, with center-left turn lane provisions. This segment remains as such until it reaches the vicinity of the grade crossing of the former Central of Georgia Railway Line. SR 11 leaves US 129 on the west side of the tracks across from the former Gray CofG railroad station, while US 129 makes a sharp left turn along the east side of the tracks at the intersection of Georgia State Route 44. SR 22 continues towards Milledgeville and Comer.

The tracks move to the left of US 129/SR 44 after Martin Luther King Jr. Drive, and the street name changes from James Street to Eatonton Highway. After passing the Gray Garden Apartments, the road curves from north-northeast to northeast and leaves the city limits just south of Industrial Boulevard, the last connecting road between SR 11 and US 129, then crosses a bridge over Wolf Creek, and encounters the Gray Bypass again. North of there the road winds through more forestland, most of which is privately owned. Within Ethridge a former section of the road branches off to the northwest at the shared intersection of Old Eatonton Road and Norman Road. From there Old Eatonton Road runs along the west side of the routes even as both roads intersect the shared intersection of Homer Chiles Road and Roosevelt Road. Old Eatonton Road ends at US 129 just north of Homer Chiles Road, but north of there another right-of-way which began at Roosevelt Road ends at US 129/SR 44 later on. It also skirts through the northern segments of Haddock where some abandoned boat repair and tackle shops can be found. The reason for the existence of such businesses is due to the parkland and wetland as it approaches the bridge over Big Cedar Creek, where US 129/SR 44 enters Putnam County, and the name of the street changes to Gray Road Southwest. This parkland Cedar Creek National Wildlife Management Area in Oconee National Forest. The first major intersection within the county is Resseaus Crossroads, which is the blinker-light intersection with Georgia State Route 212. North of that intersection it crosses a bridge over Murder Creek, and later another one named the Horace Gus Layson Memorial Bridge over the Recce Branch. Near Eatonton, the road runs along the southwest corner of a Wal-Mart Super Center, and finally approaches US Route 441/Georgia State Route 24, turning left and joining those routes in a concurrency. Continuing from Gray Road Southwest is US BUS 129/441/SR BUS 24

Throughout much of Central Georgia, US 129/441 follows SR 24 north of Eatonton, and includes an interchange with Interstate 20 at Exit 114 south of Madison. Shortly after this US 129/441/SR 24 will encounter the southern terminus of US BYP 129/441/SR BYP 24 (Madison Bypass), followed by SR 24 Spur which serves as the westbound connector to US 278/SR 12/SR 83. US 129/441/SR 24 will later join these routes in yet another concurrency, although SR 83 leaves at Washington Street. After passing by the Madison Airport, US 129/441/SR 24 leaves the concurrency with US 278/SR 12 at the north end of the Madison Bypass, and turns northeast as it crosses a bridge over a railroad line. West of another section of Oconee National Forest the concurrency runs through communities such as Apalachee, Farmington, and Bishop where it encounters the eastern terminus of Georgia State Route 186.

US 441 Business/Georgia Business Route 24 branch off to the northeast towards Watkinsville, while mainline US 129/441/SR 24 runs along the Watkinsville Bypass, which contains one intersection with New High Shoals Road, a partial cloverleaf interchange with Georgia State Route 53 near the University of North Georgia Oconee Campus, and one other intersection with a small unfinished industrial park. SR 24 ends at Georgia State Route 15 in Woodridge North as does US BUS 441/SR 24, but US 129/441 continues onto SR 15. This concurrency remains in its existing form until all three routes join the Athens Perimeter at US 29/78 (Exit 4). For a short period, the parameter is an eight-highway concurrency, consisting of US 29/US 78/US 129/US 441/SR 8/SR 10 Loop/SR 15/SR 422 (the latter of which is unsigned). Part of this concurrency ends when US 78 leaves at Exit 8. All the while the parameter gradually mores more to the northeast rather than east, as US 29 leaves at Exit 10B, when US 129/441/SR 10 Loop makes a turn on a loop ramp to the northern segment of the perimeter heading west. Evidence of a proposed eastern extension of that segment can be found east of that interchange as a stub at Old Hull Road. US 441/SR 15 leaves the concurrency at Exit 12, and US 129 leaves the Athens Perimeter at Exit 14, joining SR 15 Alt. which actually began at Exit 6.

=== Athens through Gainesville ===
After leaving the Athens Perimeter, US 129/SR 15 ALT (Jefferson Road) runs along the west side of the Athens Country Club, which it also ran along the south side of while overlapping the perimeter. As far south as the country club, US 129/SR ALT 15 is flanked by a former Seaboard Air Line Railroad (originally Gainesville Midland Railroad) line hugging along the east side occasionally curving away from it, while the road itself curves at various northwestern trajectories, occasionally running due west. In Attica, the routes encounter the eastern terminus of Georgia State Route 330 then briefly curves straight north. The road curves northwest along some large plot of farmland then northeast in front of a gas station/convenience store and the Attica Sports Complex next door. The road curves slightly to the northwest again before running under a power line right-of-way, then starts to resume its west-northwest direction just before the intersection with New Kings Bridge Road. In Arcade, SR 15 Alt. leaves at the Arcade Business Route, which was formerly part of US 129 until 2000. From here the road is overlapped by Georgia Connecting Route 11 (Jefferson Bypass) and runs almost west. After the intersection with Georgia State Route 82, it curves back to the northwest. The closest resemblance to a major intersection after this is former Georgia State Route 319 (Etheridge Road). However, Georgia State Route 11 rejoins US 129 at Winder Highway, which itself continues onto Business Route 11 leading to Downtown Jefferson. After this is an intersection with Panther Drive, which serves the Jackson County High School, and a school bus garage US 129/SR 11 then runs along a pair of bridges over the same former SAL Railroad Line that flanked it since it ran past the golf course in Athens, then intersects Holders Siding Road, which leads to the NRHP-listed Holder Plantation.

US 129 Business Route/SR 11 BUS end at US 129, which winds through the woods of Jackson County for another mile before encountering the interchange with Interstate 85 at Exit 137. The SAL line approaches the west side of the route until it reaches Pendergrass where it approaches a former segment of the road now partially designated Georgia State Route 332 which is overlapped with US 129/11 until it reaches Talmo. Shortly after the end of this concurrency, US 129/SR 11 runs through local farm fields. (Lane Widening) After Pond Fork Church Road (Former Georgia State Route 346), the road begins to climb a hill and make a reverse curve to the northeast, but ends just before the route cross the Jackson-Hall County Line, gaining the name Athens Highway.

The road is currently widened to four lanes before the western terminus of Georgia State Route 323, then curves off to the northwest again, later running through Bailey. Branching off to the right is a road named Athens Street, a former section of the Athens Highway which runs northwest until it reaches Martin Luther King Junior Boulevard. US 129/SR 11 curves to the left of there and gains the additional name of "E.E. Butler Parkway." Within Gainesville, US 129 once again joins the concurrency with US 23 at Exit 22 on Interstate 985, which is also shared by the southern terminus of US BUS 129, and SR 11 leaves the overlap to follow the business route downtown. At Exit 24 US 129 leaves across from the unmarked Old Cornelia Highway, and I-985 ends, while the US 23/GA 365 concurrency continues north as an at-grade highway that has potential to be upgraded to interstate standards. In the meantime, US 129 briefly turns west along Georgia State Route 369 (Jesse Jewell Parkway), before turning right onto Limestone Parkway, and is joined by SR 11 once again. North of Georgia State Route 284 the road curves west to encounter the northern terminus of GA Business Route 11, and Cleveland Highway continues north onto US 129/SR 11, which narrows down to two lanes with a center-left turn lane running north-northwest.

=== Gainesville through the North Carolina State Line ===
Running under power lines, the surroundings become rural and increasing mountainous. Center-left turn lanes are provided almost continuously until the Old River Pointe cluster development where the road narrows down to two lanes just before the bridge over the Chattahoochee River, followed by a Georgia State Patrol station, where the center lane begins again and it takes a sharp curve to the northeast. The south side of this segment contains mostly light commercial development, while the north side, though containing one gas station is either residential or vacant. One local street leads to Little River Park After passing a cemetery, it curves to a more northerly direction before it crosses the Bells Mill Bridge over the East Fork of the Little River at Lake Lanier. Route 129 climbs around the hills of northern Hall County cutting through two former sections of the road, one of which is abandoned, and the other a local street named Indian Trail Road. Later it passes a mobile home park below an embankment and runs between two churches across from each other in Beaver Pond. The road makes a reverse turn after Honeysuckle Road, then becomes a four-lane divided highway. However, the only intersections that are served by this divided section are the shared intersection with Jim Hill Road and Nopone Road. US 129 takes a turn to the northwest and the divided section comes to an end before the road passes through Whitmire. North of the intersection with Georgia State Route 52, more local businesses identify themselves as being in the Town of Clermont, though the road doesn't officially enter the town limits until further north. Along this segment it curves to the northeast. Nearly immediately after it does though, the road has another intersection with SR 284, and merely 0.6 miles (0.97 km) later another one with Georgia State Route 283. After the intersection with Georgia State Route 254, and a Shell gas station on the northeast corner, US 129/SR 11 crosses the Hall-White County line.

The route enters the City of Cleveland, just before the intersection with Donald E. Thurmond Parkway, then US 129/SR 11 curves to the northwest just before the southern terminus of the unfinished US Bypass 129, where the existing US 129/SR 11 turns right onto South Main Street. Branching on from the southeast is a street named Old Highway 75 South, where at one time a concurrency with Georgia State Route 75 began. The road makes a slight curve to the northwest at Boulevard Street, then heads straight north again at Hood Street, then passes by the White County Courthouse north of Underwood Street, while the Old White County Courthouse comes closer into the driver's view. Though seeming to terminate at Georgia State Route 115, the northbound and southbound lanes move around the former courthouse at Courthouse Square, until they reach East Jarrard Street, and the routes become North Main Street, which runs straight north until it curves away to the northwest at Church Street. The next intersection is Naccochee Road, which is unmarked Georgia State Route 75 Spur, and one block later, Georgia State Route 75, as well as the beginning of an overlap with Georgia State Route 75A The northern terminus of US Bypass 129 is proposed to end diagonally across from the intersection of Hulsey Road. East of US 129, the Cleveland Bypass is intended to continue along the north side of Hulsey Road to SR 75. Other than this the route passes by the White County High School, and an RV dealership and supply store. Georgia State Route 75A branches off to the northeast towards the Smithgall Woods Center, and Helen, Georgia. From there, US 129/SR 11 winds further and further northwest as it meanders through the farmlands at the foot of the North Georgia mountains, occasionally passing some camps of various types along the way.

As the route crosses the White-Lumpkin County Line, it enters the Chattahoochee-Oconee National Forest, and is given the name "Turners Corner Road," which somehow starts to curve southwest until it runs past a local convenience store and garage and runs west in front of them before curving northwest and encountering the intersection with US Route 19 and US 129 in Turner's Corner. This is also a reunification, because US 129 actually begins at US 19 in Chiefland, Florida. The routes climb over and descend the North Georgia mountains and continues north, just as US 129/SR 11 were already doing without US 19 with randomly located hill-climbing lanes. Along the way it passes by the Mountain View Campground and Trading Post. Other campgrounds include the Desoto Falls Recreation Area and the Chestatee Knoll Campground. Somewhere along the way, it gains the name "Gainesville Highway," where it winds around the east side of Blood Mountain. It also passes through a divide within the mountains known as Neels Gap along the Lumpkin-Union County Line, after which it passes by the Walasi-Yi Interpretive Center, which also contains the Appalachian Trail. A runaway truck ramp can be seen just before the entrance to Vogel State Park, which itself ran along the west side of US 19/129/SR 11 since the routes entered Union County. North of the park, Georgia State Route 180 (Wolf Pen Gap Road) joins this concurrency, where the routes encounter such sites as the Byron Herbert Reece Farm and Heritage Center, a local grocery store and a gift shop diagonally across from where SR 180 leaves the concurrency at Bald Mountain Road.

Eventually leaving the parkland US 129/19/SR 11 is surrounded by more farms and ranches, though still exists as a mountain road. In Owltown, random trading posts, flea markets and some restaurants are found along the road, one of which uses an oversized chair as a promotional tool. Some campgrounds still exist along this segment as well. Evidence that a more urban setting is to come can be found when the routes make a right turn at Glenn Gooch Bypass (doubling as Shoe Factory Road), while the name of the street formerly designated as US 19/129 changes to Cleveland Avenue. Still considered to be within parkland territory, US 19/129 climbs a hill with sparse mixed development. At a fork in the road, Shoe Factory Road branches off to the southeast, while the Glenn Gooch Bypass (Industrial Boulevard) curves left to the northeast. Descending along the hill, the road approaches an industrial park that also includes the Union County Sheriff's Office and the Colwell Probation Detention Center before curving to the northwest and passing by the Union County Department of Driver Services. Continuing to descend the hill, it intersects Roscoe Collins Drive and Panther Way, the former of which leads to Downtown Blairsville, and the latter of which leads to Union County High School. Glenn Gooch Bypass ends at US Route 76/SRs 2/515, but US 19/129/SR 11 makes a left turn at that route, joining it in another concurrency. From there, the routes run west along the northern edge of Blairsville, but after curving to the west-southwest passes under an interchange with Pat Haralson Memorial Drive, which leads to the Union County Courthouse, to the south and the Union General Hospital to the north. US 19/129/SR 11 make a right turn onto Murphy Highway while US 76/SRs 2/515 continues to the west, curving away from its former trajectory on Blue Ridge Highway.

Northwest from there, US 19/129/SR 11 passes the southwest border of the Butternut Creek Golf Course before entering Youngstown. The road turns north again where it utilizes a short causeway over Wellborn Branch, a tributary of the Nottely River before intersecting the northern terminus of Pat Haralson Memorial Drive, and across from this a local marina with a gas station/convenience store, small bait & tackle store and gift shop before the intersection with Pat Colwell Road. Random current and former boating and automotive-related businesses can be found along the way even as the road enters Canal Lake where another short causeway that makes a pond leading to Stevens Branch Creek, and is served by the Nottely Marina. Between an antique store and a furniture store, a power line right-of-way crosses from southeast to northwest as it heads over a mountain, and the road runs along the east side of that power line. Moving further away from those power lines, the road passes by a Cott Beverages production facility. A third causeway that creates a pond for Ivylog Creek, whereas further north a small culvert over Conley Creek is not used as a dam. Flashing lights on the top and bottom of the two signal crossing signs are an indication the routes are about to enter Ivylog where the eastern terminus of Georgia State Route 325 can be found across from Ivy Log Road. North of the heart of Ivy Log, the Ivy Log Cemetery can be found hidden away in a driveway among more residential zoning. The rest of the surroundings are primarily farm and ranch land even as it runs under another power line right-of-way running from southwest to northeast south of T Chapel Road. The last two intersections in the State of Georgia are local roads, the first named Tate Road and a dead-end street named B. King Lane which leads to an antique store. A gas station and strip mall can be found on the southwest corner of the North Carolina state line, where SR 11 meets its northern terminus, while US 19 continues towards Erie, Pennsylvania and US 129 continues towards Knoxville, Tennessee.

=== National Highway System ===
The following portions of US 129 in Georgia are part of the National Highway System, a system of routes determined to be the most important for the nation's economy, mobility, and defense:

- From Ocilla to about Fitzgerald
- From the southern end of the US 341 concurrency in Hawkinsville to the northern end of the US 41 concurrency and the southern end of the US 41 Bus. concurrency in the southern part of Macon
- From the northern end of the US 41 Bus. concurrency in Macon to about Gray
- From Eatonton to the North Carolina state line.

== History ==
US 129 originally ran entirely in Georgia between Macon and Gainesville, meeting its parent route in Athens. In 1935 it was expanded north to the Cleveland area and later out of state to Knoxville, Tennessee. By 1941 it was expanded south to Jasper, Florida.

Until 2016, US 19/US 129 in Blairsville continued north of the intersection with Glenn Gooch Bypass which itself was designated as US Truck Route 129. From there the name of the street changes to Cleveland Avenue. A former segment of the road named "Pruitt Circle" branches off to the right, and later both roads officially enter Blairsville. Pruitt Circle comes back to Cleveland Avenue just south of and across from the intersection with Stone Road. From there the road descends along a hill towards the historic center of town. US 19/129/SR 11 circled around the Union County Courthouse, but rather than resume the trajectory onto the northbound Pat Haralson Memorial Drive, they turn west onto Blue Ridge Street, then turn northwest onto Murphy Highway just before they intersect US Route 76/SR 515, also marking the northern terminus of US Truck Route 129.

== Major intersections ==
County	Location	mi	km	Exit	Destinations	Notes
Echols		0.000	0.000		US 129 south (SR 100 south) / SR 11 begins	Continuation into Florida; southern terminus of SR 11; southern end of SR 11 concurrency
Echols	Statenville	5.924	9.534		SR 94 – Valdosta, Fargo	
Echols	Mayday	14.589	23.479		SR 187 north – Homerville	Southern terminus of SR 187
Lanier	Stockton	22.282	35.859		US 84 / SR 38 – Valdosta, Homerville	
Lanier		30.041	48.346		SR 37 Conn. west (Frontage Road)	Eastern terminus of SR 37 Conn.
Lanier		30.196	48.596		SR 37 east – Homerville	Southern end of SR 37 concurrency
Lanier		30.404	48.930		SR 37 Conn. east (Frontage Road)	Western terminus of SR 37 Conn.
Lanier		30.535	49.141		US 221 north / SR 31 north / SR 122 east – Pearson, Waycross	Northern end of US 221 and SR 31 concurrencies; southern end of SR 122 concurrency
Lanier	Alapaha River	31.232	50.263	Captain Henry Will Jones Bridge		
Lanier	Lakeland	32.858	52.880		SR 11 Byp. north / SR 135 Byp. north (North College Road)	Northern end of SR 135 Byp. concurrency; southern terminus of SR 11 Byp.
Lanier	Lakeland	32.939	53.010		SR 135 Byp. south (South Oak Street) – Valdosta	Southern end of SR 135 Byp. concurrency
Lanier	Lakeland	33.142	53.337		SR 135 north (North Carter Street) – Willacoochee	Southern end of SR 135 concurrency
Lanier	Lakeland	33.156	53.359		US 221 south / SR 31 south / SR 135 south (South Valdosta Road) – Valdosta, Quitman, Naylor	Northern end of US 221, SR 31, and SR 135 concurrencies
Lanier	Lakeland	33.237	53.490		SR 122 west (West Main Street) – Hahira	Northern end of SR 122 concurrency
Lanier	Lakeland	33.358	53.684		SR 11 Conn. south (North Pecan Street)	Northern terminus of SR 11 Conn.
Lanier	Lakeland	33.399	53.750		SR 11 Byp. south (West Church Avenue)	Northern terminus of SR 11 Byp.
Lanier		34.779	55.971		SR 122 Conn. south	Northern terminus of SR 122 Conn.
Berrien	Ray City	40.593	65.328		SR 64 east (Samuel Street) – Pearson	Western terminus of SR 64
Berrien	Ray City	41.012	66.002		SR 37 west (Main Street) / SR 125 south (Patton Avenue) – Adel, Valdosta	Southern end of SR 37 and SR 125 concurrencies
Berrien	Nashville	50.330	80.998		SR 76 west (Adel Road) – Adel	Southern end of SR 76 concurrency
Berrien	Nashville	50.802	81.758		SR 168 east (McPherson Avenue) – Homerville	Western terminus of SR 168
Berrien	Nashville	50.906	81.925		SR 76 east (West Marion Avenue) / SR 125 north (East Marion Avenue) – Tifton, Willacoochee	Northern end of SR 76/SR 125 concurrency
Berrien	Alapaha	63.339	101.934		US 82 east / SR 520 east – Willacoochee	Southern end of US 82/SR 520 concurrency
Berrien	Alapaha	64.491	103.788		US 82 west / SR 520 west – Tifton	Northern end of US 82/SR 520 concurrency
Berrien–Irwin county line		70.203	112.981		SR 158 east – Douglas	Western terminus of SR 158
Irwin	Ocilla	78.113	125.711		SR 90 east (East Boulevard) – Willacoochee	Southern end of SR 90 concurrency
Irwin	Ocilla	78.646	126.568		US 319 south / SR 32 / SR 35 south (4th Street) – Tifton, Sycamore, Douglas	Southern end of US 319 concurrency; northern terminus of SR 35
Ben Hill	Fitzgerald	85.770	138.033		US 319 north / SR 107 (Benjamin H. Hill Drive)	Northern end of US 319 concurrency
Ben Hill	Fitzgerald	87.442	140.724		Central Avenue	Former northern end of US 319 concurrency
Ben Hill	Fitzgerald	88.065	141.727		SR 90 west (West Sultana Drive) – Rebecca	Northern end of SR 90 concurrency
Ben Hill		96.979	156.073		SR 182 east (River Road)	Western terminus of SR 182
Wilcox	Abbeville	109.235	175.797		US 280 / SR 30 (Main Street) – Rochelle, Rhine	
Wilcox		117.671	189.373		SR 233 south – Rochelle	Northern terminus of SR 233
Pulaski		128.371	206.593		SR 112 west (Finbeyson Road) – Rochelle	Southern end of SR 112 concurrency
Pulaski	Hawkinsville	132.383	213.050		US 129 Alt. / US 129 Bus. north / US 341 south / SR 27 north / SR 230 east / SR 257 east (Broad Street) / SR 112 east (Jackson Street) – Cochran, Eastman, Empire	Northern end of SR 112 concurrency; southern end of US 341, SR 27/SR 257, and SR 230 concurrencies; southern terminus of US 129 Bus.
Pulaski	Hawkinsville	132.759	213.655		SR 27 south / SR 257 south (McCormick Avenue) – Vienna, Cordele	Northern end of SR 27/SR 257 concurrency
Pulaski	Hawkinsville	133.088	214.184		SR 230 west (Broad Street) – Unadilla	Northern end of SR 230 concurrency
Pulaski	Hawkinsville	133.364	214.629		SR 26 (Commerce Street) – Montezuma, Cochran	
Pulaski	Hawkinsville	133.919	215.522		US 129 Bus. south / US 341 Bus. south / SR 11 Bus. east (Progress Avenue)	Northern terminus of US 129 Bus./US 341 Bus.; western terminus of SR 11 Bus.
Pulaski		135.148	217.500		US 341 north / SR 11 north (Perry Highway / Golden Isles Parkway) / SR 247 begins – Perry	Northern end of US 341 and SR 11 concurrencies; southern terminus of SR 247; southern end of SR 247 concurrency
Houston		148.524	239.026		SR 247 Spur south	Northern terminus of SR 247 Spur
Houston	Kathleen	150.599	242.366		SR 127 west	Eastern terminus of SR 127
Houston	Bonaire	154.682	248.937		SR 96 – Fort Valley, Jeffersonville	
Houston	Warner Robins	159.588	256.832		SR 247 Conn. west (Watson Boulevard) – Centerville	Eastern terminus of SR 247 Conn.
Bibb	Sofkee	168.008	270.383		US 41 south / SR 11 south / SR 49 south (Industrial Highway) – Perry, Byron	Southern end of US 41 and SR 11/SR 49 concurrencies; no access to US 41/SR 11/SR 49 south from US 129/SR 247 north
Bibb	Macon	170.982	275.169		US 41 Bus. north / US 41 north / SR 247 north (Broadway)	Northern end of US 41 and SR 247 concurrencies; southern terminus of US 41 Bus.
Bibb	Macon	174.251	280.430		US 80 west / SR 22 west (Eisenhower Parkway)	Southern end of US 80 and SR 22 concurrencies
Bibb	Macon	176.207	283.578		US 41 Bus. north / SR 22 east / SR 49 north (Walnut Street) – Gray, Milledgeville	Northern end of US 41 Bus., SR 22, and SR 49 concurrencies
Bibb	Macon	176.325	283.768		US 80 east / SR 87 south	Northern end of US 80 concurrency; southern end of SR 87 concurrency
Bibb	Macon	176.642	284.278		SR 22 (2nd Street)	Access only from southbound 2nd Street loop ramp
Bibb	Macon	176.975	284.814		US 23 north / SR 87 north (Riverside Drive) / SR 49 south (Spring Street)	Northern end of SR 87 concurrency; southern end of US 23 and SR 49 concurrencies
Bibb	Macon	177.187	285.155	Spring Street Bridge over the Ocmulgee River		
Bibb	Macon	177.326	285.379		I-16 (SR 404) / SR 540 (Fall Line Freeway) to I-75 – Atlanta, Dublin, Savannah, Columbus	I-16 exit 1A eastbound; no access from SR 49 south to I-16 east
Bibb	Macon	177.394	285.488		US 23 south / SR 19 south (Emery Highway)	Northern end of US 23 and SR 19 concurrencies; no left turn southbound
Bibb	Macon	177.807	286.153		US 129 Alt. south / SR 22 west (Second Street) to I-16	Southern end of SR 22 concurrency; northern terminus of US 129 Alt.
Bibb	Macon	178.439	287.170		SR 49 north (Shurling Drive) – Milledgeville	Northern end of SR 49 concurrency
Jones	Gray	188.126	302.759		SR 18 east (Gray Highway) – Gordon	Southern end of SR 18 concurrency
Jones	Gray	188.432	303.252		SR 18 west – Forsyth	Northern end of SR 18 concurrency
Jones	Gray	192.205	309.324		SR 11 north (Monticello Highway) – Monticello	Northern end of SR 11 concurrency
Jones	Gray	193.103	310.769		SR 44 south (Eatonton Highway) / SR 22 east (Gray Bypass) – Gordon, Milledgeville	Northern end of SR 22 concurrency; southern end of SR 44 concurrency
Big Cedar Creek		205.643	330.950	Bridge marking the Jones–Putnam county line		
Putnam	Resseaus Crossroads	206.763	332.753		SR 212 (Kinderhook Road) – Milledgeville, Monticello	Inside Oconee National Forest
Putnam	Eatonton	214.560	345.301		US 441 south / SR 24 south (Milledgeville Road) / US 129 Bus. north / US 441 Bus. north / SR 24 Bus. – Milledgeville, Madison	Southern end of US 441/SR 24 concurrencies; southern terminus of US 129 Bus./US 441 Bus./SR 24 Bus.
Putnam	Eatonton	216.712	348.764		SR 16 (Monticello Road) – Monticello, Sparta	
Putnam	Eatonton	219.039	352.509		US 129 Bus. south / US 441 Bus. south / SR 24 Bus. south (Madison Road)	Northern terminus of US 129 Bus./US 441 Bus./SR 24 Bus.
Morgan	Madison	236.712	380.951		I-20 (Carl Sanders Highway / SR 402) – Atlanta, Augusta	I-20 exit 114
Morgan	Madison	237.403	382.063		US 129 Byp. north / US 441 Byp. north / SR 24 Byp. north / US 278 Truck east / SR 12 Truck east (Brooks Pennington Memorial Highway)	Southern end of US 278 Truck/SR 12 Truck concurrency; southern terminus of US 129 Byp./US 441 Byp./SR 24 Byp.
Morgan	Madison	238.397	383.663		SR 24 Spur north / US 278 Truck west / SR 12 Truck west (Ward Road)	Northern end of US 278 Truck/SR 12 Truck concurrency; southern terminus of SR 24 Spur
Morgan	Madison	238.910	384.488		US 278 west / SR 12 west / SR 83 south (Eatonton Highway)	Southern end of US 278/SR 12 and SR 83 concurrencies
Morgan	Madison	239.748	385.837		SR 83 north (Washington Street) – Monroe	Northern end of SR 83 concurrency
Morgan		241.157	388.105		US 129 Byp. north / US 441 Byp. north / SR 24 Byp. north / US 278 Truck west / SR 12 Truck west (Madison Bypass) / US 278 east / SR 12 east (Greensboro Road)	Northern terminus of US 129 Byp./US 441 Byp./SR 24 Byp.; northern end of US 278/SR 12 concurrency; eastern end of US 278 Truck/SR 12 Truck
Apalachee River		248.938	400.627	Bridge marking the Morgan–Oconee county line		
Oconee		256.787	413.259		SR 186 west (High Shoals Road) – Good Hope	Eastern terminus of SR 186
Oconee		258.579	416.143		US 129 Bus. north / US 441 Bus. north / SR 24 Bus. north (Macon Highway)	Southern terminus of US 129 Bus./US 441 Bus./SR 24 Bus.
Oconee		260.317	418.940		SR 53 (Experiment Station Road) – Winder, Watkinsville	
Oconee		261.133	420.253		US 129 Bus. south / US 441 Bus. south / SR 24 Bus. south / SR 15 south (North Main Street) / SR 24 ends	Southern end of SR 15 concurrency; northern terminus of US 129 Bus./US 441 Bus./SR 24 Bus. and SR 24
Clarke	Athens	263.768	424.493		US 29 south / US 78 west / SR 8 west / SR 10 Loop inner (SR 422 inner) to SR 316 / Timothy Road	Southern end of US 29/SR 8, US 78, and SR 10 Loop/SR 422 concurrencies; SR 15 south follows exit 4A
Clarke	Athens	265.419	427.150	6	SR 15 Alt. north (Milledge Avenue)	Southern terminus of SR 15 Alt.
Clarke	Athens	266.529	428.937	7	College Station Road – University of Georgia	
Clarke	Athens	267.688	430.802	8	US 78 east / US 78 Bus. west / SR 10 (Oconee Street / Lexington Road)	Northern end of US 78 concurrency; eastern terminus of US 78 Bus.
Clarke	Athens	269.060	433.010	9	Peter Street / Olympic Drive	
Clarke	Athens	269.899	434.360	10A	Old Hull Road	Northbound exit and southbound entrance
Clarke	Athens	270.097	434.679	10D	US 29 north (SR 8 east) – Danielsville, Hartwell	Northern end of US 29/SR 8 concurrency; no exit number northbound; SR 15 follows exit 10B (northbound) and 10C (southbound).
Clarke	Athens	270.758	435.743	11	North Avenue / Danielsville Road	Signed as exits 11A (Danielsville Road) and 11B (North Avenue) southbound
Clarke	Athens	271.601	437.099	12	US 441 north / SR 15 north (Dr. M.L. King Parkway / Commerce Drive)	Northern end of US 441 and SR 15 concurrencies
Clarke	Athens	272.493	438.535	13	Chase Street	
Clarke	Athens	273.653	440.402	14	SR 10 Loop outer / SR 15 Alt. south (Prince Avenue)	Northern end of SR 10 Loop/SR 422 concurrency; southern end of SR 15 Alt. concurrency
Jackson	Attica	279.517	449.839		SR 330 west – Statham	Eastern terminus of SR 330
Jackson	Arcade	286.518	461.106		US 129 Bus. north / SR 15 Alt. north / SR 11 Conn. north	Northern end of SR 15 Alt. concurrency; southern end of SR 11 Conn. concurrency; southern terminus of US 129 Bus. and SR 11 Conn.
Jackson	Arcade	286.962	461.821		SR 82 – Winder	
Jackson	Jefferson	289.666	466.172		SR 11 south / SR 11 Bus. north (Winder Highway)	Southern end of SR 11 concurrency; northern terminus of SR 11 Conn.; southern terminus of SR 11 Bus.
Jackson	Jefferson	293.218	471.889		US 129 Bus. south / SR 11 Bus. south	Northern terminus of US 129 Bus./SR 11 Bus.
Jackson	Jefferson	294.504	473.958		I-85 (SR 403) – Atlanta, Greenville	I-85 exit 137
Jackson	Pendergrass	296.225	476.728		SR 332 east (North Old Gainesville Highway) – Hoschton	Southern end of SR 332 concurrency
Jackson	Talmo	299.114	481.377		SR 332 west (Main Street) – Oakwood	Northern end of SR 332 concurrency
Hall		306.171	492.734		SR 323 east – Gillsville	Western terminus of SR 323
Hall	Gainesville	309.340	497.834	22	I-985 south (SR 419) / US 23 / SR 11 / US 129 Bus. north (Athens Highway) – Jefferson, Gainesville	Southern end of I-985/US 23/SR 365 concurrency; southern terminus of US 129 Bus.
Hall	Gainesville	311.792	501.781	24	I-985 north (SR 419) / US 23 north (Jesse Jewell Parkway) / SR 369 east – Gainesville, Cleveland, Cumming	Northern end of I-985/US 23/SR 365 concurrency; eastern terminus of SR 369; eastern end of SR 369 concurrency
Hall	Gainesville	312.370	502.711		US 129 Bus. south / SR 11 south / SR 369 west	Southern end of SR 11 concurrency; western end of SR 369 concurrency; northern terminus of US 129 Bus.
Hall		313.948	505.250		SR 284 (Clarks Bridge Road) – Clermont	
Hall		314.487	506.118		SR 11 Bus. south (NE Cleveland Highway) – Gainesville	Northern terminus of SR 11 Bus.
Hall		322.804	519.503		SR 52 – Dahlonega, Lula	
Hall	Clermont	325.416	523.706		SR 284 – Clermont, Brookton	
Hall	Clermont	326.017	524.674		SR 283 (Holly Springs Road)	
Hall		327.956	527.794		SR 254 (Old Cleveland Road)	
White	Cleveland	333.250	536.314		US 129 Byp. north / SR 11 Byp. north	Southern terminus of US 129 Byp./SR 11 Byp.
White	Cleveland	333.849	537.278		Old Highway 75 south – Mossy Creek Golf Course, Skitt Mountain Golf Course	Former SR 75
White	Cleveland	334.544	538.396		SR 115 (Kytle Street) – Dahlonega, Clarkesville	
White	Cleveland	334.827	538.852		Old Nacoochee Road	Former SR 75 Spur
White	Cleveland	334.938	539.030		SR 75 north / SR 75 Alt. south – Helen	Southern terminus of SR 75; southern terminus of SR 75 Alt.; southern end of SR 75 Alt. concurrency
White		335.779	540.384		US 129 Byp. south / SR 11 Byp. south / SR 75 Conn. north	Northern terminus of US 129 Byp./SR 11 Byp.; southern terminus of SR 75 Conn.
White		337.932	543.849		SR 75 Alt. north – Chattahoochee-Oconee National Forest	Northern end of SR 75 Alt. concurrency
Lumpkin	Chattahoochee-Oconee; National Forest	344.972	555.179		US 19 south / SR 9 south – Dahlonega	Southern end of US 19 concurrency; northern terminus of SR 9
Union	Chattahoochee-Oconee; National Forest	355.840	572.669		SR 180 west (Wolf Pen Gap Road)	Southern end of SR 180 concurrency
Union	Chattahoochee-Oconee; National Forest	358.219	576.498		SR 180 east (Bald Mountain Road)	Northern end of SR 180 concurrency
Union		366.190	589.326		US 76 east / SR 2 east / SR 515 north – Hiawassee	Eastern end of US 76/SR 2/SR 515 concurrency
Union	Blairsville	367.258	591.044		US 76 west / SR 2 west / SR 515 south (Zell Miller Parkway) – Blue Ridge, Hiawassee	Western end of US 76/SR 2/SR 515 concurrency
Union	Ivy Log	375.810	604.808		SR 325 south (Nottely Dam Road) – Morganton	Northern terminus of SR 325
Union		377.804	608.017		US 19 north / US 129 north – Murphy	Continuation into North Carolina; northern terminus of SR 11; northern end of SR 11 concurrency.
1.000 mi = 1.609 km; 1.000 km = 0.621 mi: Concurrency terminus; Incomplete access

== See also ==
- Special routes of U.S. Route 129

U.S. Route 129
Previous state: Florida	Georgia	Next state: North Carolina
