= Georgia State Route 83 =

State highway in Georgia

State Route 83
- SR 83 highlighted in red

Route information
- Maintained by GDOT
- Length: 86.46 mi (139.14 km)
- Tourist routes: Monticello Crossroads Scenic Byway

Major junctions
- South end: US 341 / SR 7 near Culloden
- US 41 / SR 18 / SR 42 in Forsyth; I-75 in Forsyth; US 23 / SR 87 near Juliette; I-20 in Madison; US 278 / SR 12 in Madison; US 278 Truck / SR 12 Truck / SR 24 Spur in Madison; US 129 / US 441 / SR 24 in Madison
- North end: US 78 / SR 10 in Monroe

Location
- Country: United States
- State: Georgia
- Counties: Monroe, Jasper, Morgan, Walton

Highway system
- Georgia State Highway System; Interstate; US; State; Special
← SR 82	→ US 84

State Route 83 (SR 83) is an 86.46-mile-long (139.14 km) state highway that travels southwest to northeast, with a southeast–to–northwest section, within portions of Monroe, Jasper, Morgan, and Walton counties in the central part of the U.S. state of Georgia. It connects Forsyth, Monticello, Madison, and Monroe. The portion from the southwestern city limits of Monticello to the Jasper–Morgan county line is included in the Monticello Crossroads Scenic Byway.

== Route description ==
SR 83 begins at an intersection with US 341/SR 7 (Peach Blossom Trail) northeast of Culloden, in Monroe County. It heads northeast, briefly paralleling the Monroe–Lamar county line, to Forsyth. Once in Forsyth, the route forms a concurrency with US 41/SR 18, heading to downtown. Once in downtown Forsyth, the route intersects US 41/SR 18/SR 42. Here, SR 42/SR 83 begin a brief concurrency to the north. Less than 2,000 feet (0.61 km) later, the concurrency ends. SR 83 has an interchange with Interstate 75 (I-75) before leaving Forsyth. Just before leaving Monroe County, the route crosses over the Towaliga River and intersects US 23/SR 87 near Juliette. The route continues to the northeast, crossing over the Ocmulgee River at the Monroe–Jasper county line, and heads toward Monticello. Just prior to entering town, it has an intersection with SR 380 (Perimeter Road), a bypass south and east of the town. SR 83 then makes its way into downtown, where it intersects SR 11/SR 16/SR 212 at the southwestern corner of the town's square. The four routes are concurrent for one block (the southeastern corner of the square), where SR 11's southern lanes depart the concurrency. However, since the square is a one-way road, SR 11's northern lanes continue the concurrency to the northeastern corner of the square. Here, SR 16's and SR 212's eastbound lanes depart the concurrency and SR 83 departs the square and the concurrency. SR 83 then leaves Monticello, passing the Hunter Pope Country Club, and continues to travel to the northeast, toward Madison. On the way, the route has an intersection with SR 142 in Shady Dale. Shortly after, it crosses into Morgan County. Then, it crosses over the Little River. In Madison, it has an interchange with I-20. Then, it begins a concurrency with US 278/SR 12. Just under 4,000 feet (1,200 m) later, US 129/US 441/SR 24 join the concurrency on the northeastern corner of Walton Park. The six routes head to the northeast, past Hill Park, before reaching downtown. Once in downtown Madison, SR 83 leaves the concurrency and travels to the northwest, toward Monroe. It passes through the town of Bostwick. It crosses into Walton County and enters Good Hope, where the route has an intersection with the western terminus of SR 186. SR 83 continues in a northwest direction until its northern terminus, an intersection with US 78/SR 10 in the northeastern part of Monroe.

The only portion of SR 83 that is part of the National Highway System, a system of routes determined to be the most important for the nation's economy, mobility, and defense, is the concurrency with US 129/US 441/SR 24 in Madison.

=== Residents ===
There is a high unemployment rate amongst residents of the route.

== Major intersections ==
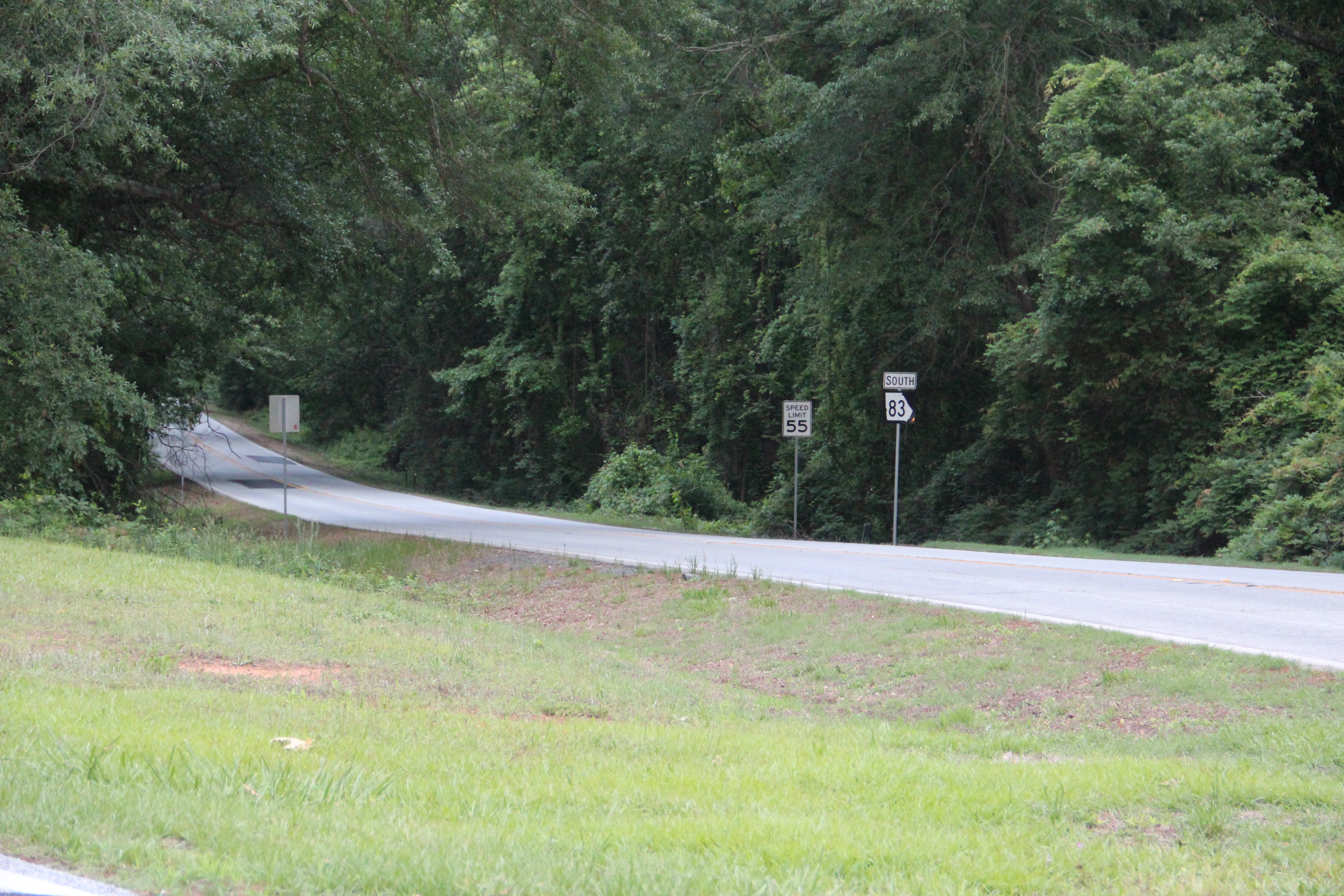
SR 83 in Bostwick

County	Location	mi	km	Destinations	Notes
Monroe		0.000	0.000	US 341 / SR 7 (Lundy Dairy Road) – Roberta, Barnesville	Southern terminus
Monroe	Forsyth	12.028	19.357	US 41 north / SR 18 west (West Main Street) – Barnesville	Southern end of US 41/SR 18 concurrency
Monroe	Forsyth	12.491	20.102	US 41 south / SR 18 east (East Main Street) / SR 42 south (South Lee Street) – Macon	Northern end of US 41/SR 18 concurrency; southern end of SR 42 concurrency
Monroe	Forsyth	12.887	20.740	SR 42 north (North Lee Street) / Patrol Road east – Jackson, Georgia Public Safety Training Center	Northern end of SR 42 concurrency; western terminus of Patrol Road
Monroe	Forsyth	13.098	21.079	I-75 (SR 401) – Macon, Atlanta	I-75 exit 187
Monroe		23.538	37.881	US 23 / SR 87 – Macon, Juliette, Jackson, Flovilla	
Jasper		37.140	59.771	SR 380 east (Perimeter Road) – Milledgeville, Eatonton, Gray	Western terminus of SR 380; former SR 83 Conn.
Jasper	Monticello	38.258	61.570	SR 11 north / SR 16 west / SR 212 west (Washington Street)	Southern end of SR 11 and SR 16/SR 212 concurrencies; southwestern corner of town square on one-way street
Jasper	Monticello	38.313	61.659	SR 11 south (East Washington Street) / Funderburg Drive east – Macon	Northern end of SR 11 concurrency; southeastern corner of town square on one-way street
Jasper	Monticello	38.363	61.739	SR 16 east / SR 212 east (Greene Street) – Forsyth, Monroe, Jackson, Eatonton, Milledgeville	Northern end of SR 16/SR 212 concurrency; northeastern corner of town square on one-way street
Jasper	Monticello	39.153	63.011	Rock Eagle Road east – Rock Eagle Lake	Former SR 300 east
Jasper		41.522	66.823	SR 380 west – Gray	Roundabout
Jasper	Shoal Creek	42.235	67.971	E. Clyde Kelly Bridge	
Jasper	Shady Dale	47.190	75.945	SR 142 (Covington Highway) – Newborn, Eatonton	
Jasper	Gap Creek	50.524	81.310	Hugh C. Tucker Sr. Memorial Bridge	
Morgan		52.255	84.096	Little River Road south – Godfrey	Former SR 213 south
Morgan	Pennington	53.826	86.625	Broughton Road north – Newborn	Southern terminus of Broughton Road; former SR 213 north
Morgan	Pennington	54.358	87.481	Newton Road west – Newborn	Eastern terminus of Newton Road; former SR 213 Spur west
Morgan	Little River	54.412	87.568	Brooks Pennington Sr. Memorial Bridge	
Morgan	Big Indian Creek	57.938	93.242	Robert Hillsman Bridge	
Morgan	Madison	60.921	98.043	I-20 (Purple Heart Highway / SR 402) – Atlanta, Augusta	I-20 exit 113
Morgan	Madison	62.412	100.442	US 278 west / SR 12 west (Atlanta Highway) / Confederate Road north – Rutledge	Southern end of US 278/SR 12 concurrency; southern terminus of Confederate Road
Morgan	Madison	62.818	101.096	US 278 Truck east / SR 12 Truck east / SR 24 Spur south (Ward Road) – Eatonton, Milledgeville, Macon	Western terminus of US 278 Truck/SR 12 Truck; northern terminus of SR 24 Spur; provides access to Morgan Medical Center
Morgan	Madison	63.238	101.772	US 129 south / US 441 south / SR 24 south – Eatonton, Macon, Milledgeville	Southern end of US 129/US 441/SR 24 concurrency
Morgan	Madison	64.078	103.124	US 129 north / US 278 east / US 441 north / SR 12 east / SR 24 north (North Main Street) – Watkinsville, Gainesville, Greensboro, Augusta, Athens, Commerce	Northern end of US 129/US 441/SR 24 and US 278/SR 12 concurrencies
Morgan	Hard Labor Creek	67.262	108.248	E.L. Tamplin Bridge	
Walton	Good Hope	81.460	131.097	SR 186 east / Pleasant Valley Road west – North High Shoals, Bishop	Western terminus of SR 186; eastern terminus of Pleasant Valley Road
Walton	Monroe	85.251	137.198	SR 83 Conn. south (Monroe Bypass) – Social Circle	Northern terminus of SR 83 Conn.
Walton	Monroe	86.456	139.137	US 78 / SR 10 / Unisia Drive north – Loganville, Athens	Northern terminus; roadway continues as Unisia Drive
1.000 mi = 1.609 km; 1.000 km = 0.621 mi: Concurrency terminus

== Special routes ==
=== Monticello connector route ===
State Route 83 Connector
- Location: Bypass around Monticello
- Length: 5.8 mi (9.3 km)
- Existed: 1983–1985

State Route 83 Connector (SR 83 Conn.) was a 5.8-mile-long (9.3 km) connector that existed entirely within the central part of Jasper County. As of 1986, it has been redesignated as SR 380.

It started at an intersection with the SR 83 mainline (Forsyth Street) southwest of Monticello. Immediately, the highway crossed over some railroad tracks of Norfolk Southern Railway and traveled to the southeast. The highway curved to the south-southeast and back to the southeast. It traveled north of Malone Lake before it curved to the east and intersected SR 11 south of the town. Then, SR 83 Conn. traveled to the northeast to an intersection with SR 212 (Milledgeville–Monticello Road) east-southeast of Monticello. Just past this intersection, the connector met its eastern terminus, an intersection with SR 16 east of town.

The entire route is in Jasper County.

Location	mi	km	Destinations	Notes
	0.0	0.0	SR 83 (Forsyth Street) – Forsyth, Monticello	Western terminus
	2.4	3.9	SR 11 – Gray, Monticello	
	4.9	7.9	SR 212 – Monticello, Milledgeville	
	5.8	9.3	SR 16 – Monticello, Eatonton	Eastern terminus
1.000 mi = 1.609 km; 1.000 km = 0.621 mi

=== Monroe connector route ===
State Route 83 Connector
- Location: Bypass around Monroe
- Length: 4.46 mi (7.18 km)
- Existed: 2025–present

State Route 83 Connector (SR 83 Conn.) is a 4.46-mile-long (7.18 km) connector that exists in the central part of Walton County, serving as a bypass of the city of Monroe. The Georgia DOT issued a contract for its construction in late 2022, with the route completed and opened in October 2025.

SR 83 Conn. begins at an intersection with SR 11 south of Monroe and travels east-northeast until it encounters Old Monroe Madison Highway. It then curves to the north-northwest and continues in that direction until encountering its northern terminus at an intersection with SR 83 and Good Hope Road east of Monroe.

The entire route is in Walton County.

Location	mi	km	Destinations	Notes
	0.00	0.00	SR 11 – Monroe, Social Circle	Southern terminus
	2.46	3.96	Old Monroe Madison Highway	
	4.46	7.18	SR 83 – Watkinsville, Monroe, Athens	Northern terminus
1.000 mi = 1.609 km; 1.000 km = 0.621 mi
