= Georgia State Route 186 =

State highway in Georgia, United States

State Route 186
- High Shoals Road
- Georgia State Route 186 highlighted in red

Route information
- Maintained by GDOT
- Length: 11.2 mi (18.0 km)

Major junctions
- West end: SR 83 in Good Hope
- East end: US 129 / US 441 / SR 24 north of Bishop

Location
- Country: United States
- State: Georgia
- Counties: Walton, Oconee

Highway system
- Georgia State Highway System; Interstate; US; State; Special
← SR 185	→ SR 187

State Route 186 (SR 186) is a state highway in the north-central part of the U.S. state of Georgia. It runs west–east within portions of Walton and Oconee Counties.

== Route description ==
The route begins at an intersection with SR 83 in Good Hope, in Walton County. It heads northeast until it crosses the Apalachee River (where it transitions into Oconee County) and enters North High Shoals, where the route becomes more easterly. Just north of the city limits of Bishop, it meets its eastern terminus, an intersection with US 129/US 441/SR 24.

== Major intersections ==
County	Location	mi	km	Destinations	Notes
Walton	Good Hope	0.0	0.0	SR 83 (Broad Street) – Madison, Monroe	Western terminus
Apalachee River		6.7	10.8	Unnamed bridge; Walton–Oconee county line	
Oconee		11.2	18.0	US 129 / US 441 / SR 24 (Macon Highway) – Madison, Watkinsville, Athens	Eastern terminus
1.000 mi = 1.609 km; 1.000 km = 0.621 mi
