= National Register of Historic Places listings in Oconee County, Georgia =

This is a list of properties and districts in Oconee County, Georgia that are listed on the National Register of Historic Places (NRHP).

This National Park Service list is complete through NPS recent listings posted March 21, 2025.

== Current listings ==
	Name on the Register	Image	Date listed	Location	City or town	Description
1	Bishop Historic District		May 10, 1996 (#96000534)	Roughly along Price Mill, Old Bishop Rds., and US 441 within the Bishop city limits 33°49′01″N 83°26′14″W	Bishop	
2	William Daniell House	William Daniell House	February 13, 1995 (#94001638)	Epps Bridge Rd., 3 1/2 mi. NW of Watkinsville; 33°54′19″N 83°27′13″W	Watkinsville	
3	Durham Homeplace		March 15, 2000 (#00000194)	1561 Watson Springs Rd. 33°45′18″N 83°19′59″W	Watkinsville	
4	Eagle Tavern	Eagle Tavern	May 13, 1970 (#70000215)	U.S. 129; 33°51′50″N 83°24′23″W	Watkinsville	
5	Elder's Mill Covered Bridge and Elder Mill	Elder's Mill Covered Bridge and Elder Mill	May 5, 1994 (#94000389)	4/5 mi. S of jct. of Elder Mill Rd. and GA 15; 33°48′11″N 83°21′49″W	Watkinsville	
6	Farmers and Citizens Supply Company Block		July 2, 1987 (#87001104)	US 129; 33°51′48″N 83°24′38″W	Watkinsville	
7	High Shoals Historic District		October 26, 2006 (#06000958)	Centered on GA 186, and banks of the Apalachee R 33°49′06″N 83°30′32″W	North High Shoals	
8	Abe Jones House	Abe Jones House	January 28, 1994 (#93001572)	2411 Hog Mountain Rd. 33°52′01″N 83°26′50″W	Watkinsville	
9	South Main Street Historic District		March 26, 1979 (#79000739)	S. Main St. and Harden Hill Rd. 33°51′30″N 83°24′30″W	Watkinsville	
