= Georgia State Route 212 =

State highway in Georgia, United States

State Route 212
- Georgia State Route 212 highlighted in red

Route information
- Maintained by GDOT
- Length: 72.3 mi (116.4 km)
- Existed: 1960–present

Major junctions
- West end: SR 155 southeast of Snapfinger
- SR 11 / SR 16 / SR 83 in Monticello; US 129 / SR 44 northwest of Milledgeville
- East end: SR 22 in Milledgeville

Location
- Country: United States
- State: Georgia
- Counties: DeKalb, Rockdale, Newton, Jasper, Putnam, Baldwin

Highway system
- Georgia State Highway System; Interstate; US; State; Special
← SR 211	→ SR 213

State Route 212 (SR 212) is a 72.3-mile-long (116.4 km) state highway that runs northwest-to-southeast through portions of DeKalb, Rockdale, Newton, Jasper, Putnam, and Baldwin counties in the central part of the U.S. state of Georgia. It runs from a point just southeast of Snapfinger southeast to Milledgeville. Oddly enough, the route is branded north and south, depending on direction, west of GA 20, while the remainder of the route is branded east/west. The route first appears as a state highway on the 1960 state highway map.

== Route description ==
=== Northwest of Monticello ===
SR 212 begins at an intersection with SR 155 (Snapfinger Road) southeast of Snapfinger, in the southeastern part of DeKalb County. It heads southeast into Rockdale County. It has an intersection with SR 138 (Stockbridge Highway). After entering Newton County, it meets SR 20, which has a very brief concurrency with it. In Snapping Shoals is SR 81. Shortly afterward, SR 212 briefly parallels the South River. The highway intersects SR 162 before crossing the Yellow River. A little distance later, it intersects SR 36. Just before crossing over Lake Jackson, it straddles the Newton–Jasper county line, going back and forth from one county to the other. When it is over the Lake, it enters Jasper County for the last time. The roadway continues to the southeast, until it reaches Monticello.

=== Monticello and Southeast areas ===
In Monticello, SR 212 intersects SR 16 (Washington Street). The two routes run concurrently to the east. In downtown Monticello, the concurrency meets SR 11/SR 83 (Forsyth Street). The two routes join the concurrency. One block later, SR 11 leaves to the southeast, following East Washington Street. Another block later, SR 83 departs the concurrency to the northeast, following North Warren Street. Just east of the town, SR 16 departs to the east, while SR 212 continues its southeastern routing. A short while later is an intersection with SR 380 (Perimeter Road), which serves as a partial bypass of Monticello. SR 212 enters Putnam County, where it has an intersection with US 129/SR 44 (Gray Road) at the eastern edge of the Oconee National Forest. It crosses over part of Lake Sinclair, and parallels a Norfolk Southern Railway track, before it meets its southeastern terminus, an intersection with SR 22 in the northwestern part of Milledgeville. Its routing bisects the area between Interstate 75 (I-75) and I-20.

== Major intersections ==
County	Location	mi	km	Destinations	Notes
DeKalb		0.0	0.0	SR 155 (Snapfinger Road) – McDonough, Decatur	Western terminus
Rockdale		8.3	13.4	SR 138 (Stockbridge Highway) – Stockbridge, Conyers	
Newton		15.0	24.1	SR 20 north (McDonough Highway) – Conyers	Western end of SR 20 concurrency
Newton		15.1	24.3	SR 20 south (Conyers Road) – McDonough	Eastern end of SR 20 concurrency
Newton		20.7	33.3	SR 81 – McDonough, Covington	
Newton		24.0	38.6	SR 162 – Porterdale	
Newton		25.8	41.5	Yellow River	
Newton		28.5	45.9	SR 36 – Jackson, Covington	
Jasper	No major junctions				
Newton	No major junctions				
Jasper	No major junctions				
Newton	No major junctions				
Lake Jackson		31.2	50.2	Newton–Jasper county line	
Jasper	Monticello	41.7	67.1	SR 16 west (Washington Street) – Jackson	Western end of SR 16 concurrency
Jasper	Monticello	42.3	68.1	SR 11 north / SR 83 south (Forsyth Street) – Monroe, Forsyth	Western end of SR 11 & SR 83 concurrencies
Jasper	Monticello	42.3	68.1	SR 11 south (East Washington Street) – Gray	Eastern end of SR 11 concurrency
Jasper	Monticello	42.4	68.2	SR 83 north (North Warren Street) – Madison	Eastern end of SR 83 concurrency
Jasper		43.6	70.2	SR 16 east – Eatonton	Eastern end of SR 16 concurrency
Jasper		45.0	72.4	SR 380 (Perimeter Road)	
Putnam	Resseaus Crossroads	59.4	95.6	US 129 / SR 44 (Gray Road)	
Cedar Creek		61.5	99.0	Putnam–Baldwin county line	
Baldwin		63.9	102.8	Lake Sinclair	
Baldwin	Milledgeville	72.3	116.4	SR 22 (Glynn Street) – Gray	Eastern terminus
1.000 mi = 1.609 km; 1.000 km = 0.621 mi: Concurrency terminus
