= Georgia State Route 44 =

State highway in Georgia, United States

State Route 44
- SR 44; mainline in red, connector in blue

Route information
- Maintained by GDOT
- Length: 94.2 mi (151.6 km)

Major junctions
- South end: US 129 / SR 18 / SR 22 in Gray
- US 129 Bus. / US 441 / SR 24 / SR 24 Bus. in Eatonton; US 129 Bus. / SR 16 / SR 24 Bus. in Eatonton; I-20 / US 278 / SR 12 / SR 15 in Greensboro; US 278 / SR 12 / SR 77 in Union Point; US 78 Bus. / SR 10 Bus. / SR 17 Bus. in Washington; US 78 / SR 10 in Washington
- North end: SR 79 northwest of Lincolnton

Location
- Country: United States
- State: Georgia
- Counties: Jones, Putnam, Greene, Taliaferro, Wilkes, Lincoln

Highway system
- Georgia State Highway System; Interstate; US; State; Special
← SR 43	→ SR 45

State Route 44 (SR 44) is a 94.2-mile-long (151.6 km) state highway that runs southwest-to-northeast through portions of Jones, Putnam, Greene, Taliaferro, Wilkes, and Lincoln counties in the central and east-central parts of the U.S. state of Georgia. The route connects Gray with the central portion of Lincoln County, northwest of Lincolnton.

== Route description ==
SR 44 begins at an intersection with US 129/SR 18/SR 22 in Gray, in Jones County. At this intersection, SR 44 begins, concurrent with US 129. The two routes head north-northeast out of town. They begin to skirt along the eastern edge of Oconee National Forest. They enter the forest very briefly before skirting the eastern edge again. They have yet another brief entrance into the forest and yet again skirt along the edge. After that, they cross over Cedar Creek into Putnam County and enter the forest proper. In Resseaus Crossroads, they intersect SR 212 (Kinderhook Road). A short distance later, they cross over Murder Creek. A few miles later, they cross over Little River and leave the forest. Approximately 1.5 miles (2.4 km) later, they enter Eatonton. They intersect US 441/SR 24 (Milledgeville Road). At this intersection, US 129 splits off to follow US 441/SR 24 north, while SR 44 continues to head north-northeast on Oak Street, now concurrent with US 129 Business/US 441 Business/SR 24 Business. The four routes curve to the north-northwest and pass the Uncle Remus Golf Course. They curve to the northeast before curving again to the north-northwest. At East Sumter Street, SR 16/SR 44 split off to the northeast. Next to Putnam General Hospital, the two routes diverge. About 1 mile (1.6 km) later, SR 44 leaves town. It crosses over Lick Creek on the Tom C. Hallman Memorial Bridge. A short distance later is a bridge over the Oconee River into Greene County. To the northeast is an interchange with Interstate 20 (I-20) in Greensboro. In the main part of town, it intersects US 278/SR 12/ 15 (West Broad Street). The four highways head concurrent to the east. A few blocks later, SR 15 (Siloam Road) splits off to the southeast. Just northeast of town, they pass Greene County Regional Airport and head into Union Point. At Athens Highway, SR 44/SR 77 split off to the north-northwest and curve to the northwest. At Washington Highway, SR 44 splits off to the northeast and then curves to a mostly eastern routing. It has crossings of the South Fork Little River and North Fork Little River. The latter one marks the Greene–Taliaferro county line. A little while later, SR 44 has a second intersection with SR 22. Almost immediately, it enters Wilkes County. Just before entering Washington, it meets the western terminus of SR 44 Spur (Harris Road). In town, it passes Ranger Stadium just before intersecting US 78 Business/SR 10 Business (Lexington Avenue). About 2,000 feet (610 m) later is US 78/SR 10 (Lexington Road). The three highways head concurrent to the east. At SR 17 Business, SR 44 splits off to the north-northeast, then turns to the east one block later. Then, it curves to the northeast and intersects SR 17 (Sam McGill Memorial Parkway). After leaving Washington, it curves its way to the northeast and crosses into Lincoln County. Less than 2 miles (3.2 km) later, it meets its northern terminus, an intersection with SR 79, just over 12 miles (19 km) northwest of Lincolnton.

The following portions of SR 44 is part of the National Highway System, a system of routes determined to be the most important for the nation's economy, mobility, and defense:

- The entire length of the SR 15 concurrency in Greensboro
- The entire length of the US 78/SR 10 concurrency in Washington

== Major intersections ==
County	Location	mi	km	Destinations	Notes
Jones	Gray	0.0	0.0	US 129 south (West Clinton Street) / SR 18 (West Clinton Street/James Street) / SR 22 (Clinton Street) – Macon, Forsyth, Gordon, Milledgeville	Southern terminus; southern end of US 129 concurrency
Jones–Putnam county line	Cedar Creek	14.0	22.5	Crossing over the Cedar Creek	
Putnam	Resseaus Crossroads	15.2	24.5	SR 212 (Kinderhook Road) – Milledgeville, Monticello	
Putnam	Eatonton	23.0	37.0	US 129 north / US 441 / SR 24 (Milledgeville Road) / US 129 Bus. north / US 441 Bus. north / SR 24 Bus. north – Milledgeville, Madison	Northern end of US 129 concurrency; southern end of US 129 Business/US 441 Business/SR 24 Business concurrency
Putnam	Eatonton	25.2	40.6	US 129 Bus. north / US 441 Bus. north / SR 24 Bus. north / SR 16 west (South Jefferson Avenue)	Northern end of US 129 Business/US 441 Business/SR 24 Business concurrency; southern end of SR 16 concurrency
Putnam	Eatonton	26.4	42.5	SR 16 east (Sparta Highway) – Sparta	Northern end of SR 16 concurrency
Putnam		34.0	54.7	Tom C. Hallman Memorial Bridge over Lick Creek (part of Lake Oconee)	
Greene	Greensboro	45.0	72.4	I-20 (Carl Sanders Highway / SR 402) – Atlanta, Augusta	I-20 exit 130
Greene	Greensboro	47.8	76.9	US 278 west / SR 12 west / SR 15 north (West Broad Street)	Southern end of US 278/SR 12 and SR 15 concurrencies
Greene	Greensboro	48.0	77.2	SR 15 south (Siloam Road) – Sparta	Northern end of SR 15 concurrency
Greene	Union Point	54.7	88.0	US 278 east / SR 12 east / SR 77 south (Lamb Avenue)	Northern end of US 278/SR 12 concurrency; southern end of SR 77 concurrency
Greene	Union Point	55.3	89.0	SR 77 north (Athens Highway) – Woodville	Northern end of SR 77 concurrency
Taliaferro		65.8	105.9	SR 22 – Crawfordville, Lexington	
Wilkes		74.3	119.6	SR 44 Spur east (Harris Road)	Western terminus of SR 44 Spur
Wilkes	Washington	77.5	124.7	US 78 Bus. / SR 10 Bus. (Lexington Avenue)	
Wilkes	Washington	78.1	125.7	US 78 west / SR 10 west (Lexington Road)	Southern end of US 78/SR 10 concurrency
Wilkes	Washington	78.9	127.0	US 78 east / SR 10 east / SR 17 Bus. south (Poplar Drive)	Northern end of US 78/SR 10 concurrency; southern end of SR 17 Business concurrency
Wilkes	Washington	79.0	127.1	SR 17 Bus. north (Tignall Road)	Northern end of SR 17 Business concurrency
Wilkes	Washington	79.7	128.3	SR 17 (Sam McGill Memorial Parkway) – Thomson, Tignall	
Lincoln		94.2	151.6	SR 79 (Elberton Highway) – Lincolnton, Elberton	Northern terminus
1.000 mi = 1.609 km; 1.000 km = 0.621 mi: Concurrency terminus

== Bannered route ==
State Route 44 Spur
- Location: Southwest of Washington
- Length: 2.0 mi (3.2 km)

State Route 44 Spur (SR 44 Spur) is a 2.0-mile-long (3.2 km) spur route of SR 44 that exists entirely within the central part of Wilkes County. It is known as Harris Road for its entire length.

It begins at an intersection with SR 44 mainline (Greensboro Road) southwest of Washington. It heads nearly due east until it meets its eastern terminus, an intersection with SR 47 (Sharon Road) south of the main part of town.

The only piece of SR 44 Spur that is included as part of the National Highway System, a system of roadways important to the nation's economy, defense, and mobility, is the part concurrent with US 78/SR 10 in Washington.

The entire route is in Wilkes County.

Location	mi	km	Destinations	Notes
	0.0	0.0	SR 44 (Greensboro Road) – Union Point, Washington	Western terminus
	2.0	3.2	SR 47 (Sharon Road) – Crawfordville, Washington	Eastern terminus
1.000 mi = 1.609 km; 1.000 km = 0.621 mi

== See also ==
- List of state routes in Georgia (U.S. state)
- List of highways numbered 44
