= Murder Creek =

Murder Creek may refer to:

- Murder Creek (Alabama)
- Murder Creek (Georgia)
