= Georgia State Route 380 =

State highway in Georgia, United States

State Route 380
- Perimeter Road
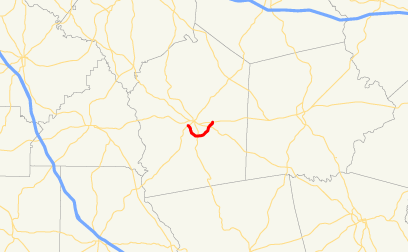

Route information
- Maintained by GDOT
- Length: 5.8 mi (9.3 km)
- Existed: 1983–present

Major junctions
- West end: SR 83 southwest of Monticello
- East end: SR 16 east of Monticello

Location
- Country: United States
- State: Georgia
- Counties: Jasper

Highway system
- Georgia State Highway System; Interstate; US; State; Special
← SR 379	→ SR 381

State Route 380 (SR 380) is a 5.8-mile-long (9.3 km) state highway that travels west-to-east in a southern arc entirely within Jasper County in the central part of the U.S. state of Georgia. The highway acts as a partial bypass of Monticello.

== Route description ==
SR 380 starts at an intersection with SR 83 (Forsyth Street) southwest of Monticello. Immediately, the route crosses over a Norfolk Southern Railway line and travels to the southeast. The route curves to the south-southeast and back to the southeast. It passes north of Malone Lake before curving to the east and intersecting SR 11 south of the town. Then, SR 380 travels to the northeast to an intersection with SR 212 (Milledgeville–Monticello Road) east-southeast of Monticello. Just past this intersection, SR 380 meets its eastern terminus, an intersection with SR 16 east of town.

SR 380 is not part of the National Highway System, a system of roadways important to the nation's economy, defense, and mobility.

== History ==
The road that would eventually become SR 380 was established in 1983 along the current routing of SR 380, although it was designated as SR 83 Connector. By January 1986, the entire highway was redesignated as SR 380.

== Major intersections ==
The entire route is in Jasper County.

Location	mi	km	Destinations	Notes
	0.0	0.0	SR 83 (Forsyth Street) – Forsyth, Monticello	Western terminus
	2.4	3.9	SR 11 – Gray, Monticello	
	4.9	7.9	SR 212 (Milledgeville–Monticello Road) – Monticello, Milledgeville	
	5.8	9.3	SR 16 – Monticello, Eatonton	Eastern terminus
1.000 mi = 1.609 km; 1.000 km = 0.621 mi
