= Old Union County Courthouse (Georgia) =

- U.S. National Register of Historic Places
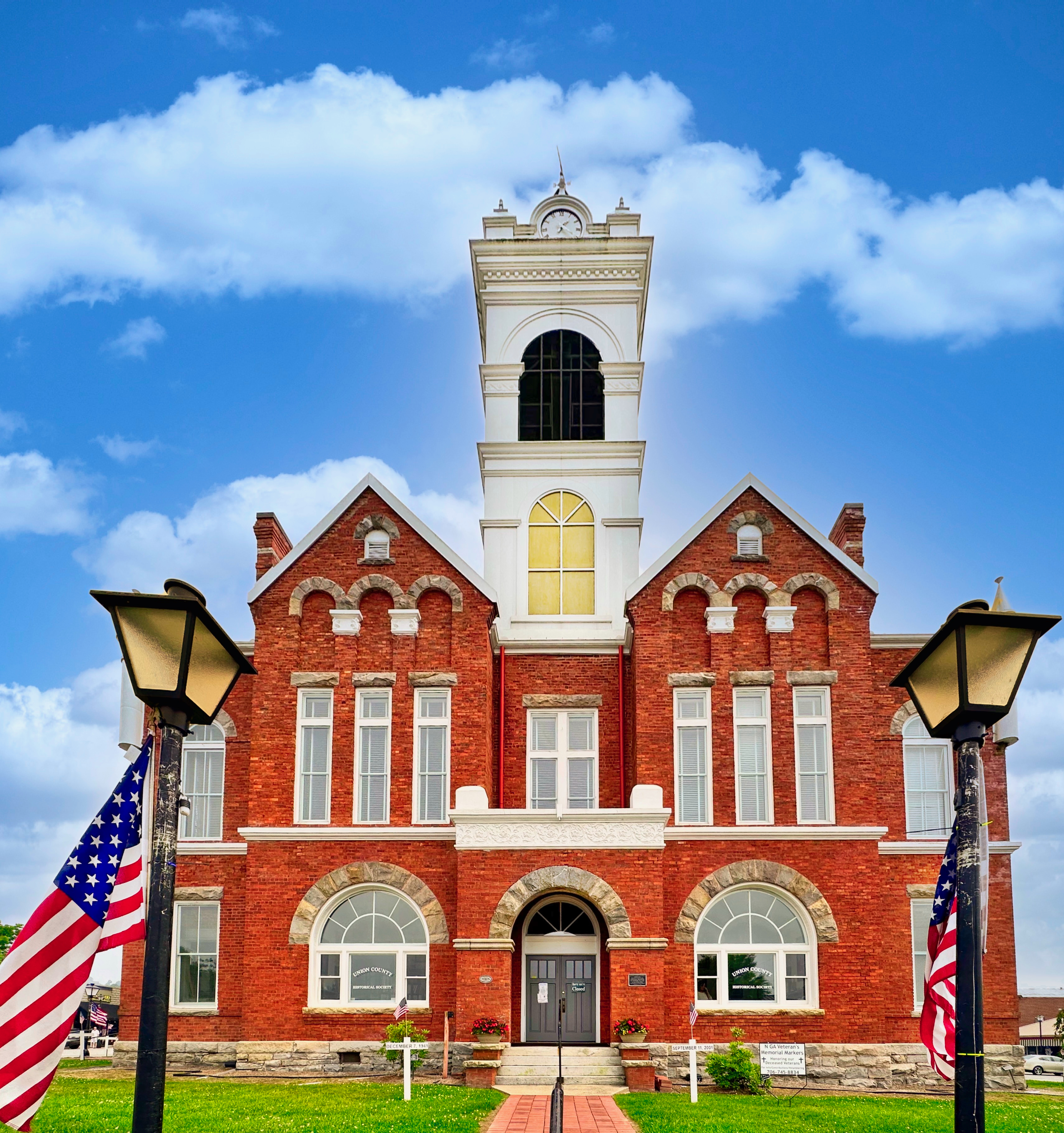

- Location within Georgia Location within the United States
- Location: Courthouse Sq., Blairsville, Georgia
- Coordinates: 34°52′34″N 83°57′30.6″W
- Area: 1 acre (0.40 ha)
- Built: 1899
- Built by: McGinty, M.B.
- Architect: Golucke & Stewart
- Architectural style: Romanesque
- MPS: Georgia County Courthouses TR
- NRHP reference No.: 80001249
- Added to NRHP: September 18, 1980

The Old Union County Courthouse in Blairsville, Georgia was listed on the National Register of Historic Places in 1980.

It was designed by architects Golucke & Stewart. It has a hipped roof with intersecting gables. An original clock tower is gone, as are some decorative turrets. It has a Richardsonian Romanesque stone-trimmed arch at the main entrance.

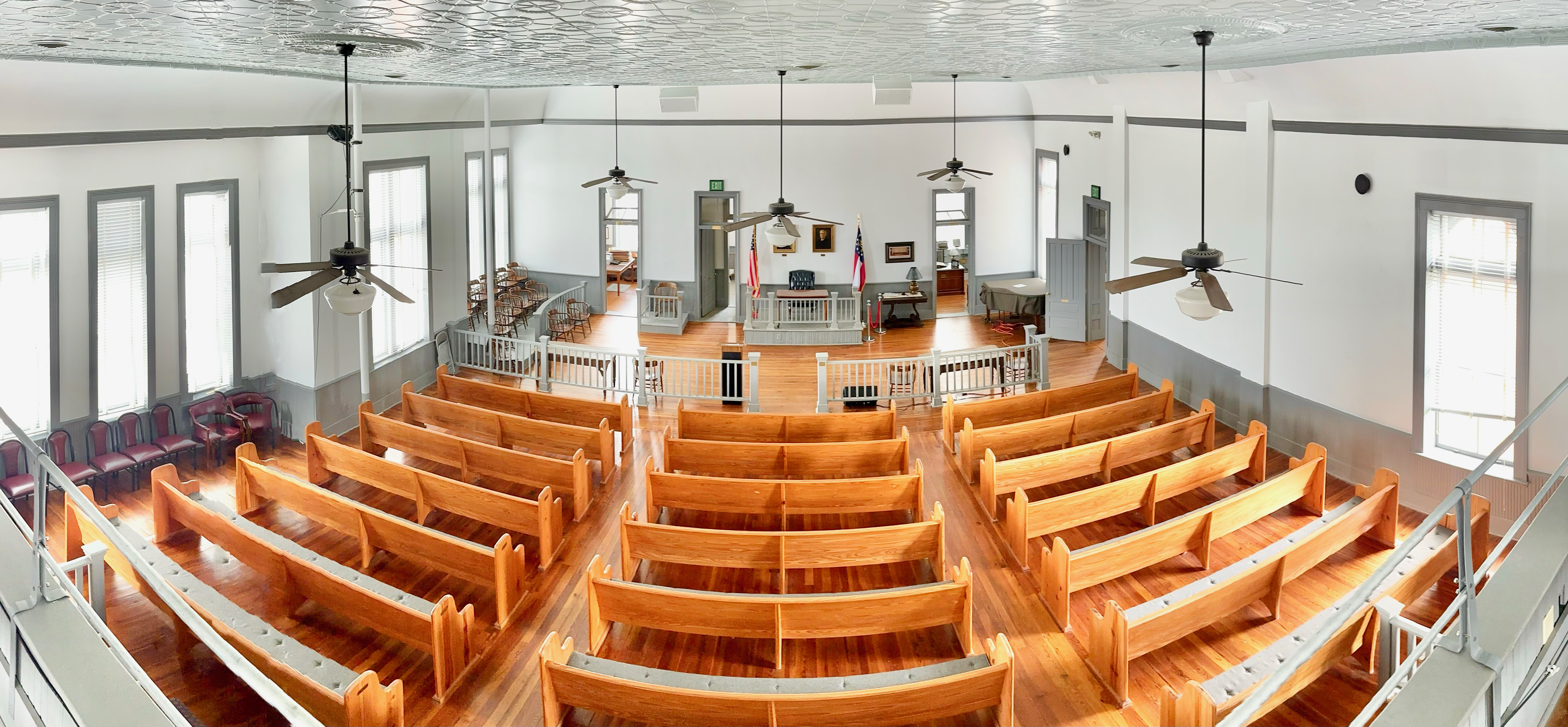
The historic courtroom

The courthouse is in the center of a traffic circle that includes Cleveland Street from the south, Pat Haralson Memorial Drive from the north, Blue Ridge Street from the west, and Wellborn Street and Candler Drive from the east. Until 2016 US 19/129/SR 11 circled around the courthouse from Cleveland Street to the south onto Blue Ridge Street to the west.
