= Bishop Historic District =

Historic district in Georgia, United States

- U.S. National Register of Historic Places
- U.S. Historic district
- Location within Georgia Location within the United States
- Location: Bishop, Georgia, U.S. (roughly along Price Mill, Old Bishop Rds., and US 441 within the Bishop town limits)
- Coordinates: 33°49′6.85″N 83°26′18.13″W
- Architectural style: Queen Anne; Colonial Revival; Classical Revival
- NRHP reference No.: 96000534
- Added to NRHP: October 5, 1996

Bishop Historic District is a historical residential district located in the town of Bishop, Oconee County, Georgia, United States.

The district was added to the National Register of Historic Places in 1996 due to its number of historic resources within the town of Bishop's limits. At private, public-local and public-federal levels, the town has 63 contributing buildings, one contributing site and one contributing structure.

The area registered as having historical significance is roughly along Price Mill Road, Old Bishop Road and U.S. Route 441 within the Bishop town limits.

== See also ==
- National Register of Historic Places listings in Oconee County, Georgia
