= Neels Gap =

Mountain pass in Georgia, United States

Neel Gap
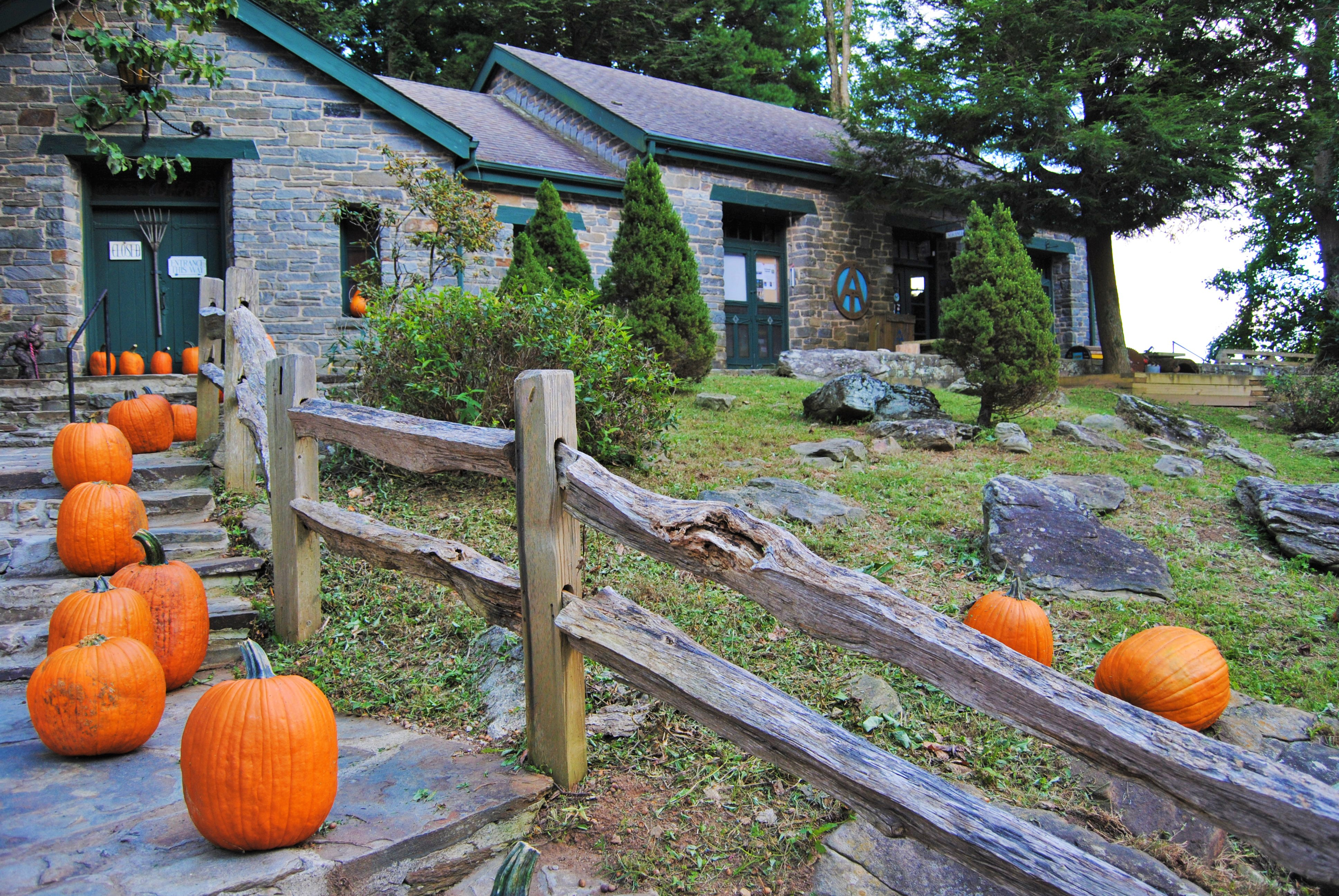
- Walasi-Yi Inn in Neels Gap
- Interactive map of Neel Gap
- Traversed by: US 19 / US 129 / SR 11

Third Approach
- Location: Union and Lumpkin counties, Georgia, United States
- Range: Blue Ridge Mountains
- Coordinates: 34°44′05″N 83°55′05″W

Neel Gap (also known as Frogtown Gap, Frogtown Pass, Neel Gap, and Walasi-yi) is a divide along the Blue Ridge Mountains at the base of the Frogtown Creek in the counties of Union and Lumpkin in the U.S. state of Georgia. The divide is located approximately 14.5 miles (23.3 km) northeast of Dahlonega.

The gap was named after W. R. Neel, a government surveyor.
