= Walasi-Yi Interpretive Center =

- U.S. National Register of Historic Places
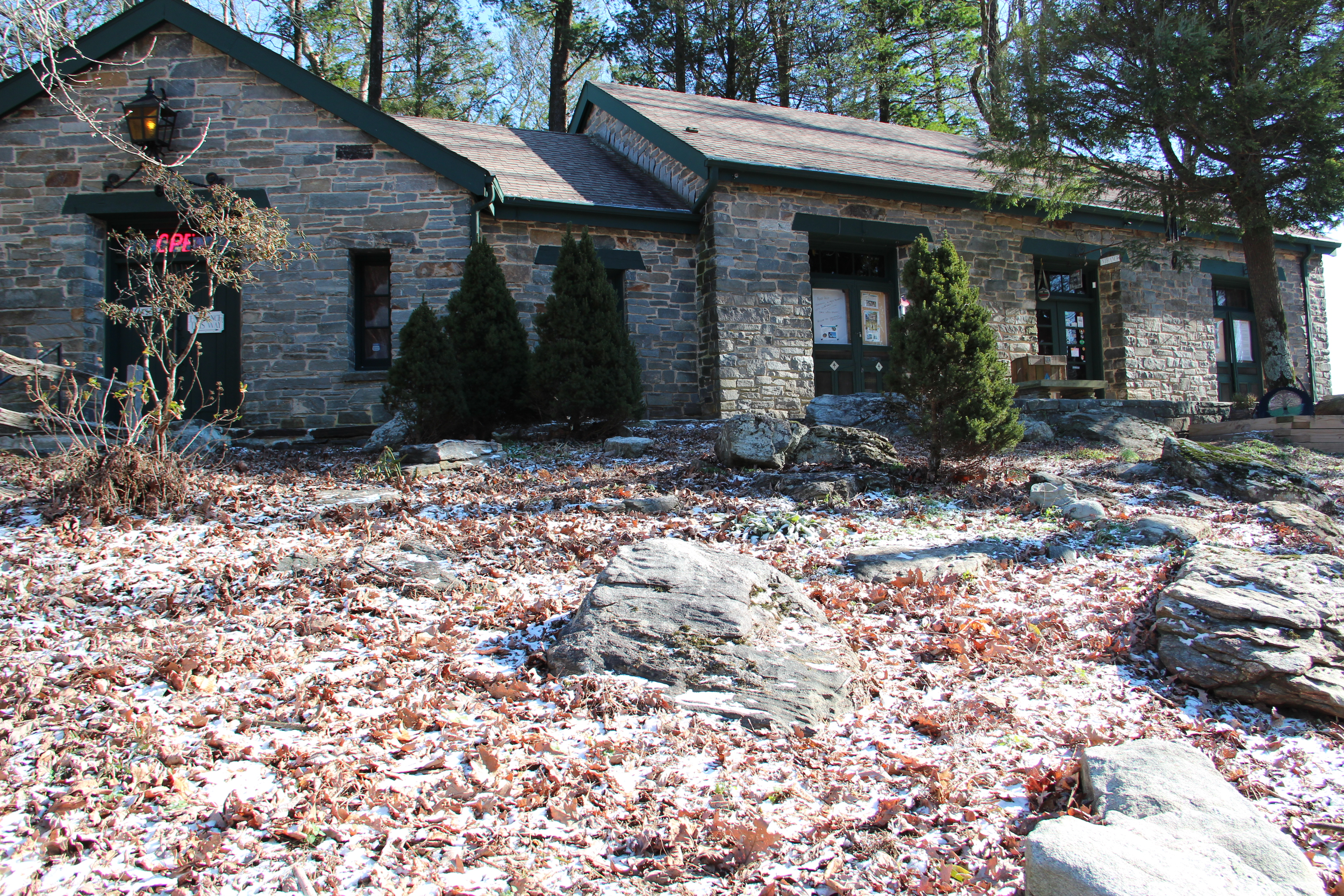

- Location within Georgia Location within the United States
- Location: Blairsville, Union County, Georgia
- Coordinates: 34.73529°N 83.91770°W
- Built: 1930's
- NRHP reference No.: 79000749
- Added to NRHP: 1979

The Walasi-Yi Interpretive Center is a small stone building located along US 19/129 at Neels Gap, Georgia, United States, on the eastern side of Blood Mountain. It is notable as the only place where the 2,175-mile-long Appalachian Trail passes through a man-made structure. It is currently the first mail drop available to northbound thru-hikers that does not require one to leave the trail.

== History ==
Originally a log structure built by a logging company, the building took its present form during the 1930s when it was rebuilt by the Civilian Conservation Corps (CCC). It served as a restaurant and inn until 1965, when it was abandoned. Soon after, the building was rented by an artist group who used it until 1969, when it was again left vacant.

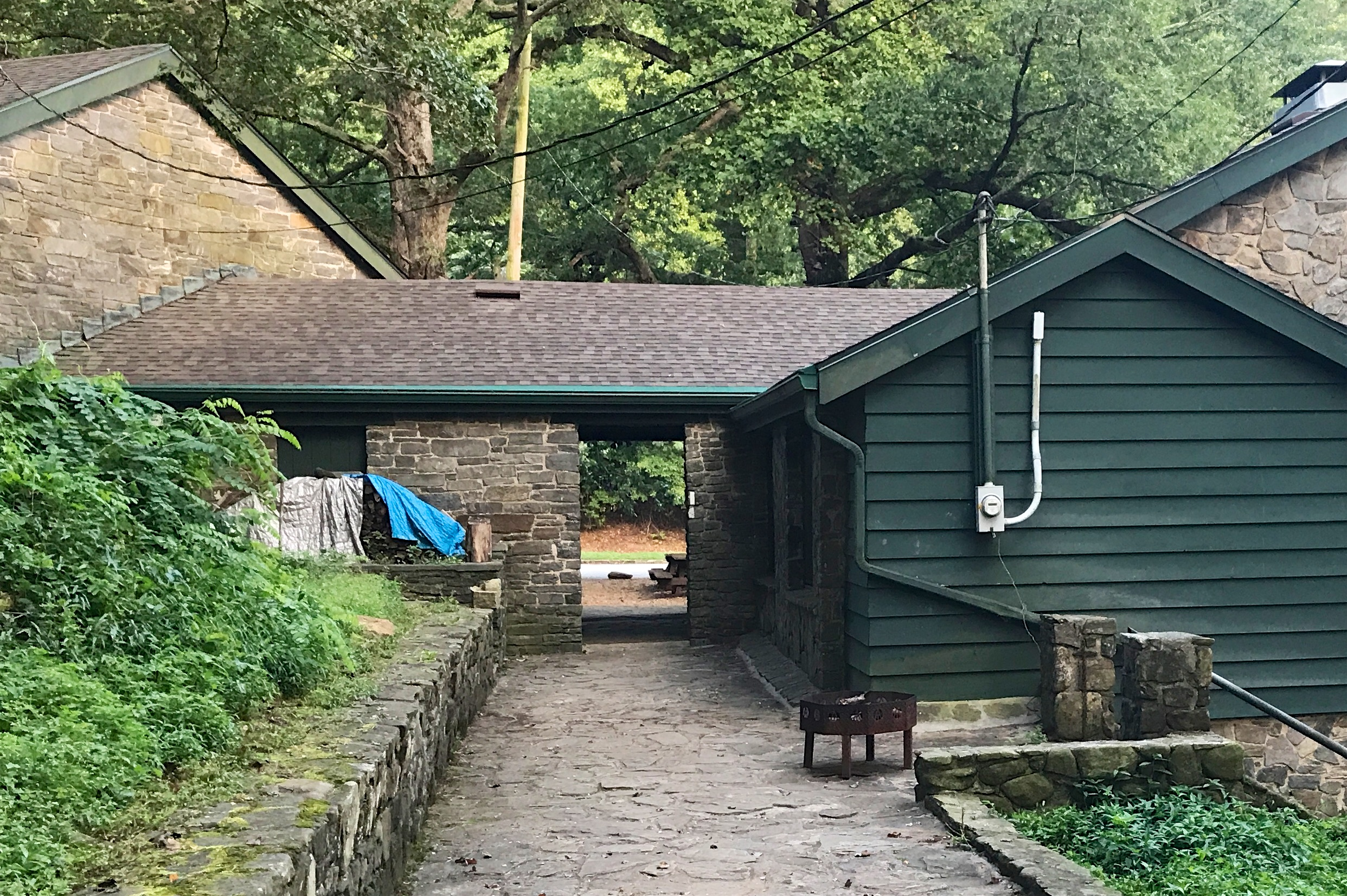
Appalachian Trail passing through the breezeway

By the mid-1970s, the building was slated for demolition, but a group of conservation-minded locals lobbied successfully for its inclusion on the National Register of Historic Places in 1977. Spared from destruction, the building served as an irregular store to hikers and tourists until 1983, when Jeff and Dorothy Hansen took over management of what became known as Mountain Crossings at Walasi-Yi.

In the 1990s, the store was operated by Peggy and Justin. Famous travel book author Bill Bryson visited the store for his book “A Walk in the Woods“. The building was then leased and operated by Winton Porter from 2001 to 2013. Porter wrote a book about his experiences and the unusual events and characters he saw there called Just Passin' Thru (2009). It is currently operated by Logan and Georganna Seamon.

Currently, in addition to the outfitter, the Walasi-Yi center offers a hostel. The bunks in the hostel are at a premium in early spring when the vast majority of northbound thru-hikers are traveling through northern Georgia.

== See also ==
- Appalachian Trail
- Blood Mountain
- Neels Gap, Georgia
- North Georgia mountains
- U.S. Route 19 in Georgia
- U.S. Route 129 in Georgia
- Civilian Conservation Corps
- National Register of Historic Places
