= Jones County School System =

School district in Georgia (U.S. state)

Jones County School District

Address
- 125 Stewart Avenue Gray, Georgia, 31032-5201; United States
- Coordinates: 33.004585°N 83.536244°W

District information
- Grades: Pre-Kindergarten - 12
- Superintendent: Jessica B Graves, Ph.D.
- Accreditations: Southern Association of Colleges and Schools; Georgia Accrediting Commission

Students and staff
- Enrollment: 5,000+
- Faculty: 300+

Other information
- Telephone: (478) 986-3032
- Fax: (478) 986-4412
- Website: www.jones.k12.ga.us

The Jones County School District is a public school district in Jones County, Georgia, United States, based in Gray. It serves the communities of Gray, Haddock, and Macon.

== Schools ==
The Jones County School District has one pre-kindergarten, four elementary schools, two middle schools, and one high school.

=== Pre-Kindergarten ===
- Jones County Pre-Kindergarten (website)

=== Elementary schools ===
- Dames Ferry Elementary School (website)
- Gray Elementary School (website)
- Mattie Wells Elementary School (website)
- Turner Woods Elementary (website)

=== Middle schools ===
- Clifton Ridge Middle School (website)
- Gray Station Middle School (Fall 2005 - present) (website)

=== High schools ===
- Jones County High School (Georgia) (website) is a public high school located in Gray, Georgia, United States. The school has approximately 1,600 students enrolled in grades 9-12 and is accredited by the Southern Association of Colleges and Schools.

== Former Schools ==
=== Public Schools ===
- Maggie Califf Campus (1955 - Spring 2019)
  - Over the course of 65 school years the campus operated under many different names serving varying grade levels.
    - Maggie Califf School
    - Maggie Califf Elementary & High School
    - Califf Middle Grades
    - Ninth Grade Academy (Fall 2006 - Spring 2019)
  - The former 20 acre campus has been left untouched since its closing and is located at 110 Maggie Califf St, Gray, GA 31032.

=== Private Schools ===
- Jonesco Academy (Fall 1970 - Spring 1989)
  - Since its closing, the former campus has served as the Jones County Government Center.
- River North Academy (Fall 1974 - Spring 1982)
  - The academy was founded as a result of a fracture at Tattnall Square Academy.
  - The 22-acre campus was located off of River North Boulevard and was demolished, with the exception of the gym, shortly after the academy's closing. The former site is now an apartment complex located on River Pointe Drive with the abandoned gym still remaining.
