= Georgia State Route 187 =

State highway in Georgia, United States

State Route 187
- Georgia State Route 187 highlighted in red

Route information
- Maintained by GDOT
- Length: 27.0 mi (43.5 km)

Major junctions
- South end: US 129 / SR 11 in Mayday
- North end: US 441 / SR 89 in Homerville

Location
- Country: United States
- State: Georgia
- Counties: Clinch, Echols

Highway system
- Georgia State Highway System; Interstate; US; State; Special
| ← SR 186 | → SR 188 |

State Route 187 (SR 187) is a 27.0-mile-long (43.5 km) state highway in the south-central part of the U.S. state of Georgia. It connects Mayday to Homerville.

== Route description ==
SR 187 begins in Echols County in Mayday at an intersection with US 129/SR 11. This is the only major junction in the county. The road enters Clinch County southwest of Homerville. In town, SR 187 meets its northern terminus, an intersection with US 441/SR 89.

== Major intersections ==
| County | Location | mi | km | Destinations | Notes |
|---|---|---|---|---|---|
| Echols | Mayday | 0.0 | 0.0 | US 129 / SR 11 | Southern terminus |
| Clinch | Homerville | 27.0 | 43.5 | US 441 / SR 89 (South Church Street) | Northern terminus |
1.000 mi = 1.609 km; 1.000 km = 0.621 mi
