= South Main Street Historic District (Watkinsville, Georgia) =

Historic district in Georgia, United States

- U.S. National Register of Historic Places
- U.S. Historic district
- Location within Georgia
- Location: S. Main St. and Harden Hill Rd., Watkinsville, Georgia
- Coordinates: 33°51′30″N 83°24′30″W
- Area: 35 acres (14 ha)
- Built: 1840
- Built by: Multiple
- Architect: Multiple
- Architectural style: Greek Revival, Queen Anne, Gothic Revival
- NRHP reference No.: 79000739
- Added to NRHP: March 26, 1979

The South Main Street Historic District of Watkinsville, Georgia is a 35 acres (14 ha) historic district along S. Main St. and Harden Hill Rd. It was listed on the National Register of Historic Places in 1979. It included 19 contributing buildings.

It includes Greek Revival, Queen Anne, and Gothic Revival architecture. It includes the Watkinsville Methodist Church the Butler House and the Veale House.
