= Little River (Oconee River tributary) =

Coordinates: 33.18764°N 83.27405°W

Location
- Country: United States

Physical characteristics
- Source
  - location: Georgia

The Little River is a 62-mile-long (100 km) tributary of the Oconee River in the U.S. state of Georgia. It rises in Walton County near the city of Social Circle and flows southeast to join the Oconee River in Lake Sinclair.

== See also ==
- List of rivers of Georgia
