= Commissioner Creek =

Creek in Georgia US

Coordinates: 32°49′05″N 82°58′04″W

Commissioner Creek is a stream in the U.S. state of Georgia. It is a tributary to the Oconee River.

The creek was named after a local Indian agent commissioner. A variant name is "Commissioners Creek".
