= Murder Creek (Georgia) =

Stream in Georgia, United States

Coordinates: 33°13′2.49″N 83°24′16.58″W

Murder Creek is a stream in the U.S. state of Georgia.

According to tradition, Murder Creek received its name in the late 1700s when a robbery and murder occurred near its banks.
