= Good Hope, Georgia =

- Town
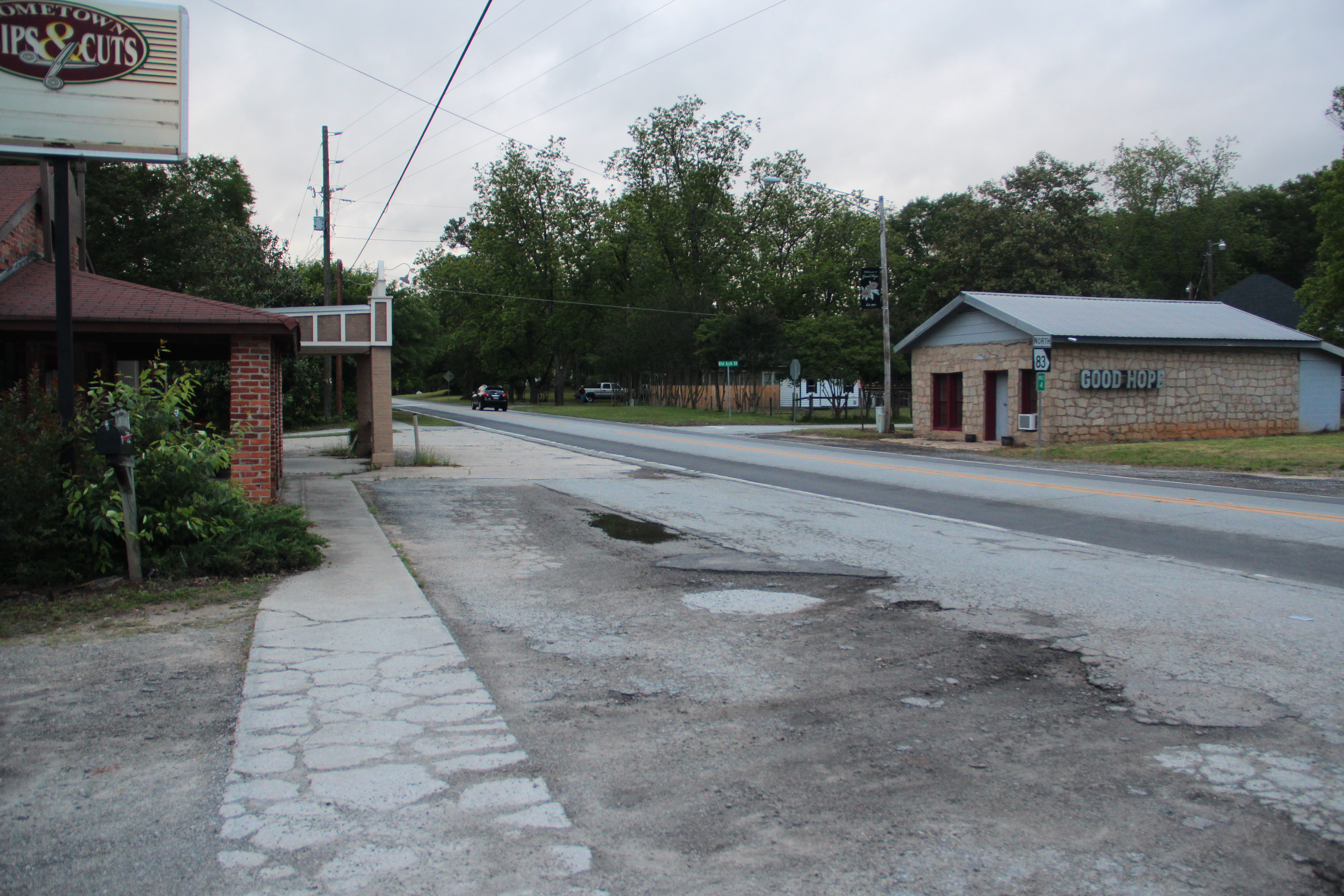
- Georgia State Route 83 in Good Hope

- Location in Walton County and the state of Georgia
- Coordinates: 33°47′13″N 83°36′35″W
- Country: United States
- State: Georgia
- County: Walton

Government
  - Mayor: Randy Garret

Area
  - Total: 1.87 sq mi (4.84 km^{2})
  - Land: 1.84 sq mi (4.77 km^{2})
  - Water: 0.027 sq mi (0.07 km^{2})
- Elevation: 797 ft (243 m)

Population (2020)
  - Total: 339
  - Density: 184.0/sq mi (71.04/km^{2})
- Time zone: UTC-5 (Eastern (EST))
  - Summer (DST): UTC-4 (EDT)
- ZIP code: 30641
- Area code: 470/678/770
- FIPS code: 13-33896
- GNIS feature ID: 0314680
- Website: goodhopega.com

Good Hope is a town in Walton County, Georgia, United States. The population was 339 in 2020.

== History ==
The Georgia General Assembly incorporated the place as the Town of Good Hope in 1905. The community was so named on account of the first settlers' "good hope" their town would grow to become prosperous.

== Geography ==
Good Hope is located at 33°47′13″N 83°36′35″W (33.786925, -83.609638).

According to the United States Census Bureau, the town has a total area of 1.8 square miles (4.7 km^{2}), of which 1.8 square miles (4.7 km^{2}) is land and 0.56% is water.

== Demographics ==
Historical population
| Census | Pop. | Note | %± |
|---|---|---|---|
| 1910 | 151 | | — |
| 1920 | 248 | | 64.2% |
| 1930 | 194 | | −21.8% |
| 1940 | 219 | | 12.9% |
| 1950 | 189 | | −13.7% |
| 1960 | 165 | | −12.7% |
| 1970 | 202 | | 22.4% |
| 1980 | 200 | | −1.0% |
| 1990 | 181 | | −9.5% |
| 2000 | 210 | | 16.0% |
| 2010 | 274 | | 30.5% |
| 2020 | 339 | | 23.7% |
U.S. Decennial Census

As of the census of 2000, there were 210 people, 85 households, and 66 families residing in the town. By 2020, its population was 339.

== Notable person ==
Moina Michael, a.k.a., the Poppy Lady, was born in the town of Good Hope, in 1869. She pioneered the symbol of the silk poppy in tribute to World War I veterans.
