= Lake Sinclair =

- Location within Georgia Location within the United States
- Location: Baldwin / Hancock / Putnam counties, Georgia, US
- Coordinates: 33°08′26″N 83°12′07″W
- Type: reservoir
- Primary inflows: Oconee River (see article)
- Primary outflows: Oconee River
- Basin countries: United States
- Surface area: 15,330 acres (6,200 ha)
- Max. depth: 86 ft (26 m)
- Water volume: 330,000 acre⋅ft (0.41 km^{3})
- Shore length^{1}: 417 mi (671 km)
- Surface elevation: 342 ft (104 m)
- Settlements: Milledgeville
- ^{1} Shore length is not a well-defined measure.

Lake Sinclair is a man-made lake in central Georgia near Eatonton. It is operated by Georgia Power.

The lake was named after Benjamin W. Sinclair, a Georgia Power official.

== Location ==
Located in the central region of Georgia, on the Oconee River, Lake Sinclair stretches through the counties of Putnam, Hancock, and Baldwin. Lake Sinclair was created in 1953. With approximately 417 miles (671 km) of scenic shoreline, winding coves and inlets as well as several vast stretches of open water, Lake Sinclair offers recreational boating pleasure. The lake is made up of a 15,330-acre (6,200 ha) area of water and provides both electricity and recreation. Milledgeville, Georgia, is the largest city on Lake Sinclair, though most of the lake is located in Putnam County.

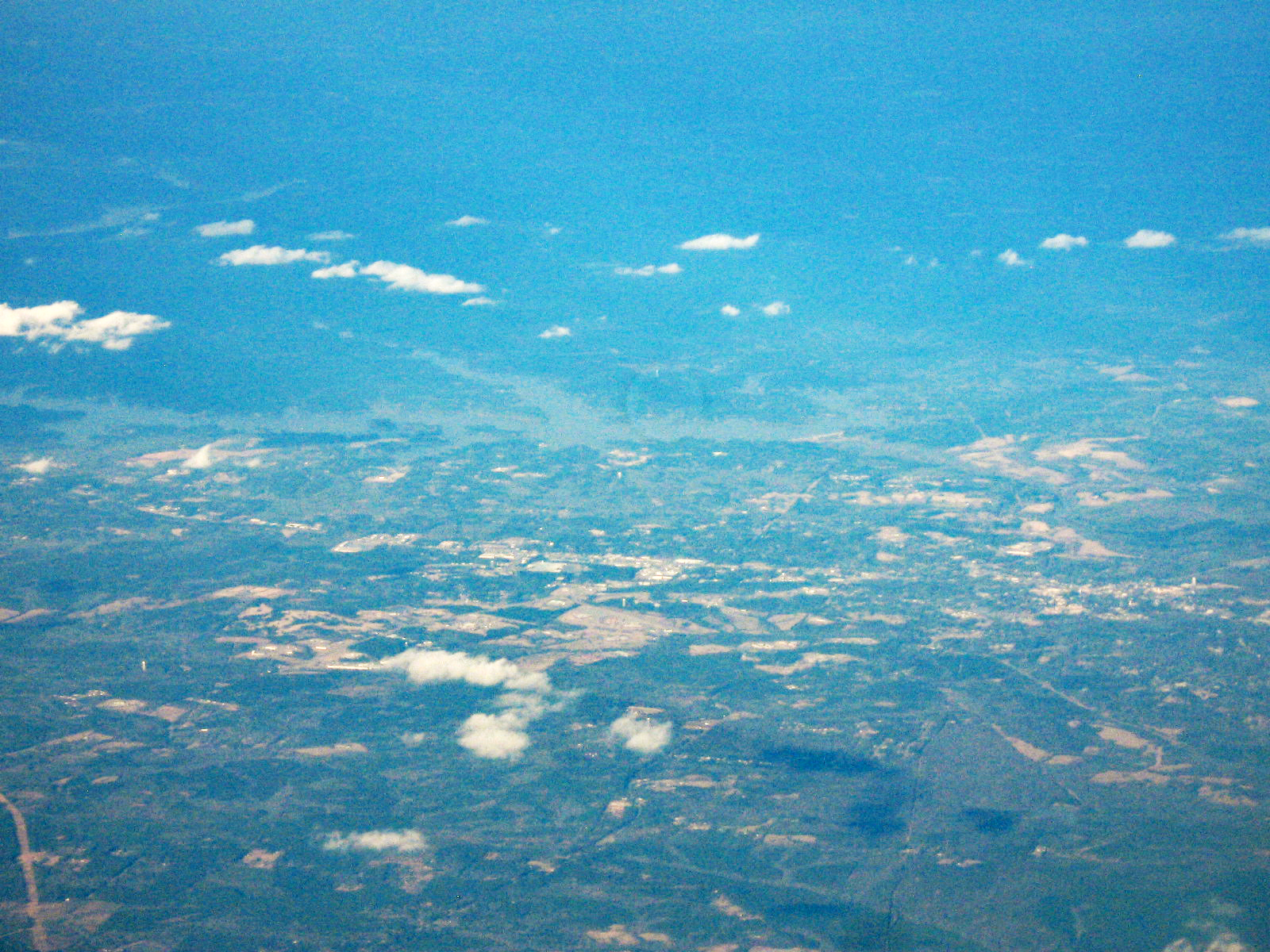
Lake Sinclair and dam

== Recreation ==
Lake Sinclair is largely used by lake residents and people who live and house their boats, watercraft and RVs on the lake. There is easy access to the water with two public boat ramps provided by Georgia Power. There are also marinas and boat storage areas located on the lake. Other areas of access to the lake includes Oconee Springs Park. Lake Sinclair is the site of several fishing tournaments—both local and national—and attracts fishermen of various skill levels and interest. Visitors find fall and winter fishing at Lake Sinclair a special treat due to the mild climate and activity. There is also a popular fishing area below the dam near Milledgeville. Several recreation areas, such as Oconee Springs Park and Rocky Creek Park, provide day-use facilities that include picnic tables, grills, boat ramp and a small beach. There is camping and even cabin rentals provided at Oconee Springs Park, but not Rocky Creek Park.

== Hydroelectric generating station ==
Lake Sinclair was created in 1953 when the waters of the Oconee river were dammed to create a 45,000-kilowatt (60,000 hp) hydroelectric generating station. Development of this lake as a recreational area began through a planned cooperative program. Participants included the Oconee Area Planning and Development Commission, the U.S. Forest Service, The Georgia Game and Fish Commission, Georgia Power Company and several independent businesses.

== Tributaries ==
Lake Sinclair is fed by several creeks and rivers, including Beaver Dam, Crooked, Rooty, Sandy Run, Shoulder Bone, Potato, Island, Rocky, Nancy Branch, Reedy Branch, and Little River. The lake covers 15,330 acres (6,200 ha) and has 417 miles (671 km) of shoreline with a maximum depth of 90 feet (27 m).

== Sinclair Dam ==
The Sinclair dam is approximately 100 feet (30 m) high and 2,800 feet (850 m) long.
