= North High Shoals, Georgia =

- Town
- Location in Oconee County and the state of Georgia
- Coordinates: 33°49′44″N 83°29′38″W
- Country: United States
- State: Georgia
- County: Oconee

Area
  - Total: 2.46 sq mi (6.36 km^{2})
  - Land: 2.42 sq mi (6.27 km^{2})
  - Water: 0.035 sq mi (0.09 km^{2})
- Elevation: 692 ft (211 m)

Population (2020)
  - Total: 552
  - Density: 228.2/sq mi (88.09/km^{2})
- Time zone: UTC-5 (Eastern (EST))
  - Summer (DST): UTC-4 (EDT)
- ZIP code: 30645
- FIPS code: 13-56308
- GNIS feature ID: 2407005
- Website: northhighshoals.org

North High Shoals is a town in Oconee County, Georgia, United States. As of the 2020 census, North High Shoals had a population of 552.

== History ==
The Georgia General Assembly incorporated North High Shoals as a town in 1933. The community was named after shoals in the Apalachee River.

== Geography ==
North High Shoals is located at 33°50′3″N 83°30′4″W (33.834159, -83.501055).

According to the United States Census Bureau, the town has a total area of 2.5 square miles (6.5 km^{2}), all land.

== Government ==
The town's government consists of a Town Council made up of a mayor and five council members. As of January 1, 2020, these were: Toby P. Bradberry, Mayor; Eric Carlson, Council Member, Post 1; Jason Presley, Council Member, Post 2; Ann Evans, Council Member, Post 3; Hilda Kurtz, Council Member, Post 4; and Violet Dawe, Council Member, Post 5.

Meetings are held on the third Monday of each month at 7:30 pm at the town hall, located at 260 Hillsboro Road.

== Demographics ==
Historical population
Census	Pop.	Note	%±
1950	124		—
1960	122		−1.6%
1970	165		35.2%
1980	256		55.2%
1990	268		4.7%
2000	439		63.8%
2010	652		48.5%
2020	552		−15.3%
U.S. Decennial Census

North High Shoals racial composition as of 2020
Race	Num.	Perc.
White (non-Hispanic)	500	90.58%
Black or African American (non-Hispanic)	7	1.27%
Native American	3	0.54%
Asian	1	0.18%
Other/Mixed	19	3.44%
Hispanic or Latino	22	3.99%

As of the 2020 United States census, there were 552 people, 148 households, and 131 families residing in the town.
