= Bishop, Georgia =

- Town
- Location in Oconee County and the state of Georgia
- Country: United States

Area
  - Total: 0.85 sq mi (2.2 km^{2})
  - Land: 0.78 sq mi (2.03 km^{2})
  - Water: 0.0077 sq mi (0.02 km^{2})
- GNIS feature ID: 2405269
- Website: www.townofbishop.org

Bishop is a town in Oconee County, Georgia, United States. As of the 2020 census, the city had a population of 332.

The town's historic district was added to the National Register of Historic Places in 1996.

== History ==
The community was named after W. H. Bishop, a local landowner and politician. A post office called Bishop has been in operation since 1889. The town was incorporated in 1890.

== Geography ==
Bishop is located at 33°48′59″N 83°26′11″W (33.816355, -83.436304).

According to the United States Census Bureau, the town has a total area of 0.8 square miles (2.1 km^{2}), all land.

== Demographics ==
Historical population
Census	Pop.	Note	%±
1910	268		—
1920	300		11.9%
1930	241		−19.7%
1940	217		−10.0%
1950	253		16.6%
1960	214		−15.4%
1970	235		9.8%
1980	172		−26.8%
1990	158		−8.1%
2000	146		−7.6%
2010	224		53.4%
2020	332		48.2%
U.S. Decennial Census

Bishop racial composition as of 2020
Race	Num.	Perc.
White (non-Hispanic)	272	81.93%
Black or African American (non-Hispanic)	21	6.33%
Asian	12	3.61%
Other/Mixed	15	4.52%
Hispanic or Latino	12	3.61%

As of the 2020 United States census, there were 332 people, 115 households, and 102 families residing in the town.
