= Gray, Georgia =

- City
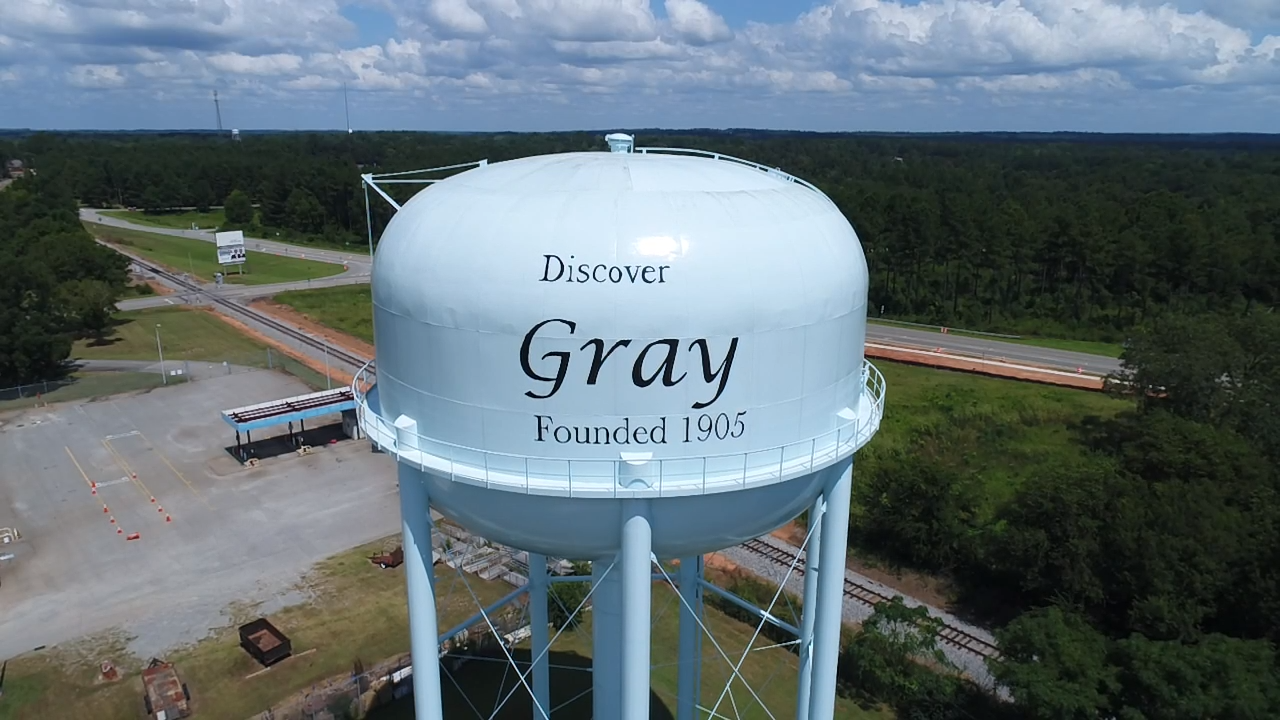

- Flag Seal
- Motto: Home of the annual Daylily Festival
- Location in Jones County and the state of Georgia
- Coordinates: 33°00′31″N 83°32′03″W
- Country: United States
- State: Georgia
- County: Jones

Area
  - Total: 3.95 sq mi (10.22 km^{2})
  - Land: 3.94 sq mi (10.20 km^{2})
  - Water: 0.0077 sq mi (0.02 km^{2})
- Elevation: 600 ft (183 m)

Population (2020)
  - Total: 3,436
  - Density: 872.6/sq mi (336.93/km^{2})
- Time zone: UTC-5 (Eastern (EST))
  - Summer (DST): UTC-4 (EDT)
- ZIP code: 31032
- Area code: 478
- FIPS code: 13-34512
- GNIS feature ID: 0327996
- Website: grayga.us

Gray is a city in Jones County, Georgia, United States. The population was 3,436 at the 2020 census, up from 3,276 at the 2010 census. In 2025, its population was estimated at 3,555. The city is the county seat of Jones County. It is part of the Macon metropolitan area.

== History ==
Gray was founded in 1851 and named for local wealthy cotton planter and landowner James M. Gray. In 1905, the seat of Jones County was transferred to Gray and in 1911 it was incorporated as a town.

== Geography ==
Gray is located in central Jones County. U.S. Route 129 passes through the center of town.

According to the United States Census Bureau, Gray has a total area of 3.9 square miles (10.1 km^{2}), of which 0.01 square miles (0.03 km^{2}), or 0.34%, are water. Gray is drained to the west by tributaries of Walnut Creek, flowing to the Ocmulgee River, and to the east by tributaries of Commissioner Creek, flowing to the Oconee River.

== Demographics ==
Historical population
| Census | Pop. | Note | %± |
|---|---|---|---|
| 1920 | 559 | | — |
| 1930 | 653 | | 16.8% |
| 1940 | 698 | | 6.9% |
| 1950 | 866 | | 24.1% |
| 1960 | 1,320 | | 52.4% |
| 1970 | 2,014 | | 52.6% |
| 1980 | 2,145 | | 6.5% |
| 1990 | 2,189 | | 2.1% |
| 2000 | 1,811 | | −17.3% |
| 2010 | 3,276 | | 80.9% |
| 2020 | 3,436 | | 4.9% |
U.S. Decennial Census

=== 2020 census ===
As of the 2020 census, Gray had a population of 3,436. The median age was 37.5 years. 26.5% of residents were under the age of 18 and 17.1% of residents were 65 years of age or older. For every 100 females there were 86.5 males, and for every 100 females age 18 and over there were 80.0 males age 18 and over.

0.0% of residents lived in urban areas, while 100.0% lived in rural areas.

There were 1,327 households in Gray, of which 40.1% had children under the age of 18 living in them. Of all households, 42.1% were married-couple households, 13.8% were households with a male householder and no spouse or partner present, and 39.6% were households with a female householder and no spouse or partner present. About 29.2% of all households were made up of individuals and 18.3% had someone living alone who was 65 years of age or older. There were 798 families residing in the city.

There were 1,420 housing units, of which 6.5% were vacant. The homeowner vacancy rate was 0.5% and the rental vacancy rate was 3.4%.

Gray racial composition as of 2020
| Race | Num. | Perc. |
|---|---|---|
| White (non-Hispanic) | 2,300 | 66.94% |
| Black or African American (non-Hispanic) | 927 | 26.98% |
| Native American | 8 | 0.23% |
| Asian | 18 | 0.52% |
| Pacific Islander | 1 | 0.03% |
| Other/Mixed | 114 | 3.32% |
| Hispanic or Latino | 68 | 1.98% |

== Education ==
=== Jones County School District ===
The Jones County School District holds pre-school to grade twelve, and consists of four elementary schools, two middle schools, and one high school. As of 2025, the district had approximately 350 full-time teachers and over 4,994 students.

- Dames Ferry Elementary School
- Turnerwoods Elementary School
- Gray Elementary School
- Mattie Wells Elementary School
- Gray Station Middle School
- Clifton Ridge Middle School
- Jones County High School
