= Effigy Mounds National Monument =

Prehistoric mounds in Iowa, United States

- IUCN category III (natural monument or feature)
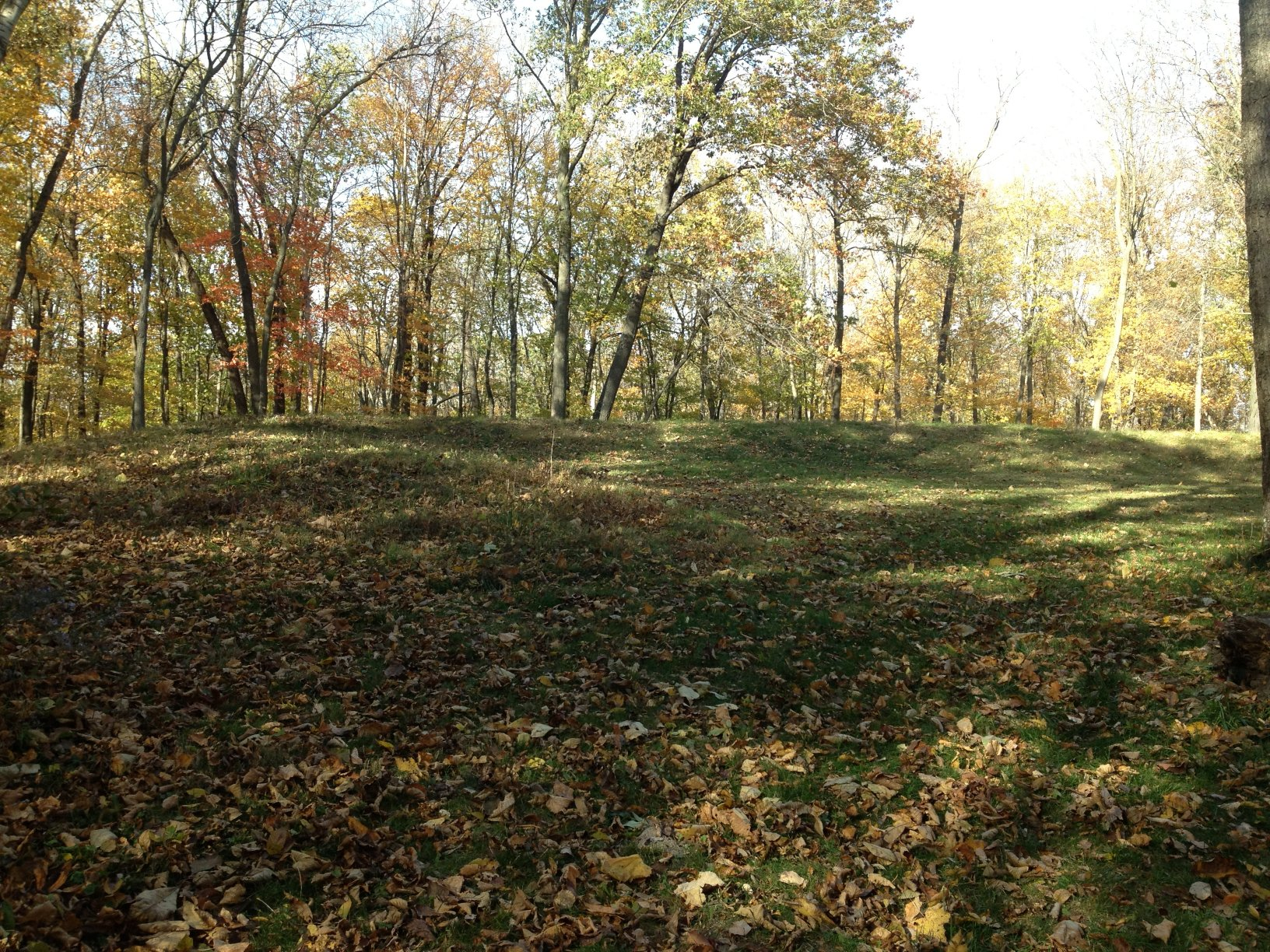
- Big Bear Mound at Effigy Mounds National Monument

- Location within Iowa Location within the United States
- Interactive map of Effigy Mounds National Monument
- Location: Allamakee / Clayton Counties, Iowa, USA
- Nearest city: Marquette, Iowa and Dubuque, Iowa
- Coordinates: 43.0888°N 91.1856°W
- Area: 2,526 acres (10.22 km^{2})
- Created: October 25, 1949
- Visitors: 56,912 (in 2025)
- Governing body: National Park Service
- Website: Effigy Mounds National Monument

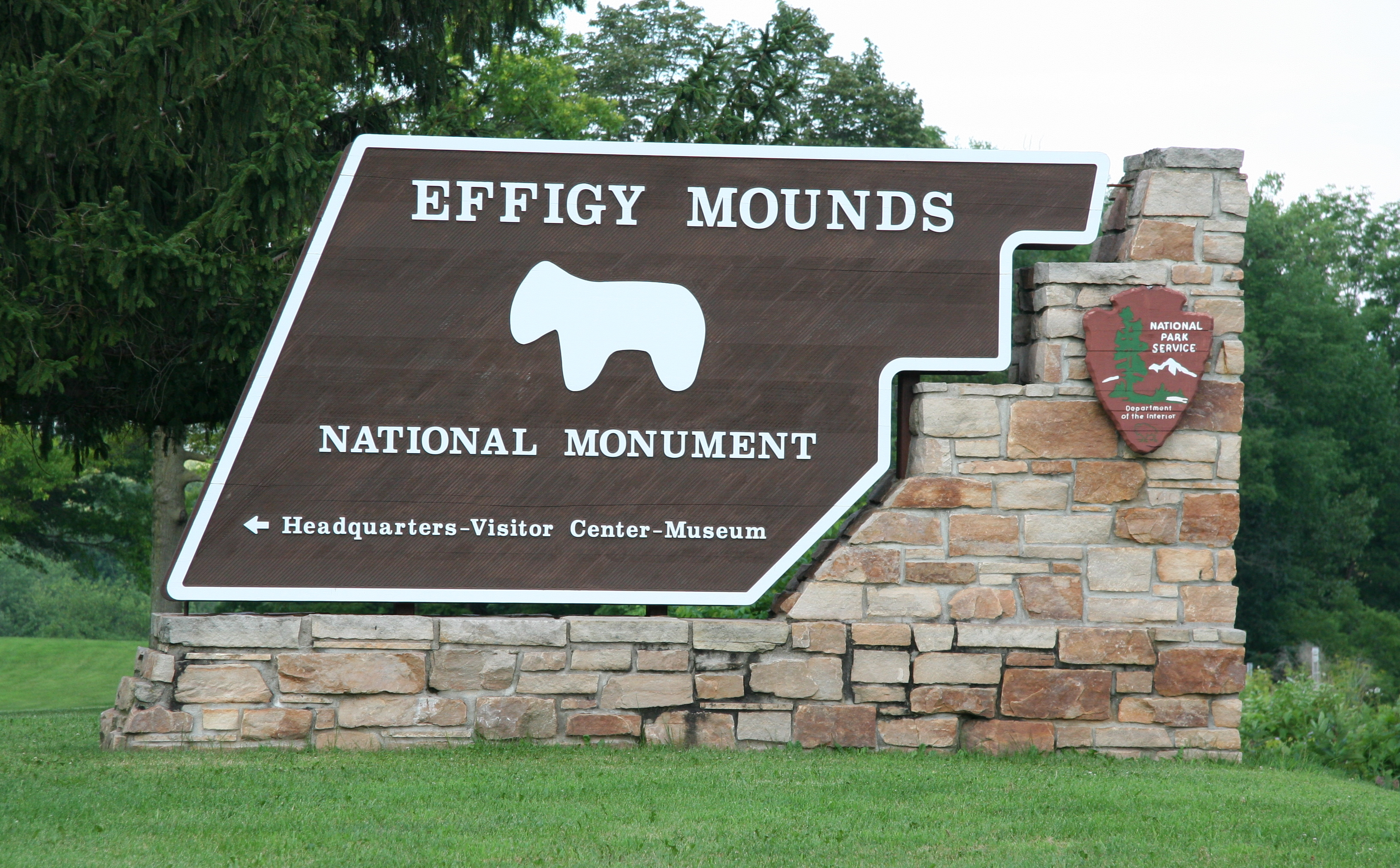
An entrance to Effigy Mounds National Monument

Effigy Mounds National Monument preserves more than 200 prehistoric mounds built by pre-Columbian Mound Builder cultures, mostly in the first millennium CE, during the later part of the Woodland period of pre-Columbian North America. Numerous effigy mounds are shaped like animals, including bears and birds.

The monument is located primarily in Allamakee County, Iowa, with a small part in Clayton County, Iowa, in the midwestern United States. The park's visitor center is located in Harpers Ferry, Iowa, just north of Marquette. In 2017, the Effigy Mounds were featured in the America the Beautiful Quarters Program.

== Mounds ==
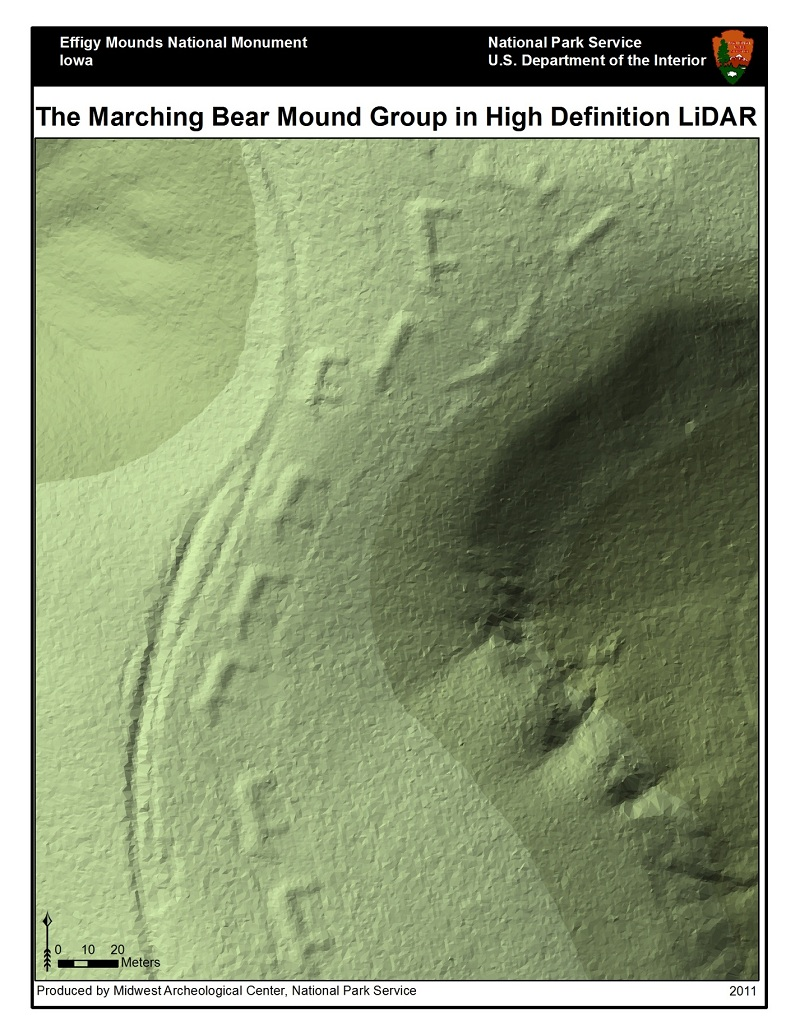
Lidar-derived image of Marching Bears Mound Group, Effigy Mounds National Monument.

Prehistoric earthworks by mound builder cultures are common in the Midwest. However, mounds in the shape of mammals, birds, or reptiles, known as effigies, apparently were constructed primarily by peoples in what is now known as southern Wisconsin, northeast Iowa, and small parts of Minnesota and Illinois. An exception is the Great Serpent Mound in southwestern Ohio.

Effigy Mounds National Monument takes in the western edge of the effigy region. The North Unit (67 mounds) and South Unit (29 mounds) are located where the counties meet along the Mississippi River. They are contiguous and easily accessible. The Sny Magill Unit (112 mounds) is approximately 11 miles (18 km) south of the other units, and offers no visitor facilities. Other mounds are located on remote parts of the Monument property. The monument contains 2,526 acres (10.22 km^{2}) with 206 mounds, of which 31 are effigies. The largest, Great Bear Mound, measures 42 meters from head to tail and rises over a meter above the original ground level.

In northeastern Iowa, the Effigy Mounds area was a point of transition between the eastern hardwood forests and the central prairies. Native Americans and early settlers would have been able to draw on natural resources available in forests, wetlands, and prairies. These areas were occupied by humans for many centuries.

Effigy Mounds is adjacent to the Upper Mississippi River National Wildlife and Fish Refuge, the Driftless Area National Wildlife Refuge, the Yellow River State Forest, and a short distance to the south, Pikes Peak State Park. There are also a number of state-owned wildlife management areas, such as the one at Sny Magill Creek, where Clayton County also maintains a county park.

== Tribes associated with the monument ==
Numerous federally recognized tribes have linguistic and cultural ties to the ancestral peoples who built the effigy and other earthwork mounds at the monument site. The National Park Service recognizes a cultural association between the monument and the following present nations:

- Iowa Tribe of Kansas and Nebraska
- Iowa Tribe of Oklahoma
- Otoe–Missouria Tribe of Indians
- Ho-Chunk Nation of Wisconsin
- Winnebago Tribe of Nebraska
- Upper Sioux Community of Minnesota
- Shakopee Mdewakanton Sioux Community In the State of Minnesota
- Lower Sioux Indian Community of Mdewakanton Sioux Indians of Minnesota
- Prairie Island Indian Community In the State of Minnesota
- Sac and Fox Tribe of the Mississippi in Iowa
- Sac and Fox Nation of Missouri in Kansas and Nebraska
- Sac and Fox Nation of Oklahoma
- Crow Creek Sioux of South Dakota
- Omaha Tribe of Nebraska
- Santee Sioux Nation of Nebraska
- Standing Rock Sioux Tribe of North Dakota
- Yankton Sioux Tribe of South Dakota
- Sisseton Wahpeton Oyate
- Flandreau Santee Sioux Tribe
- Ponca Tribe of Nebraska

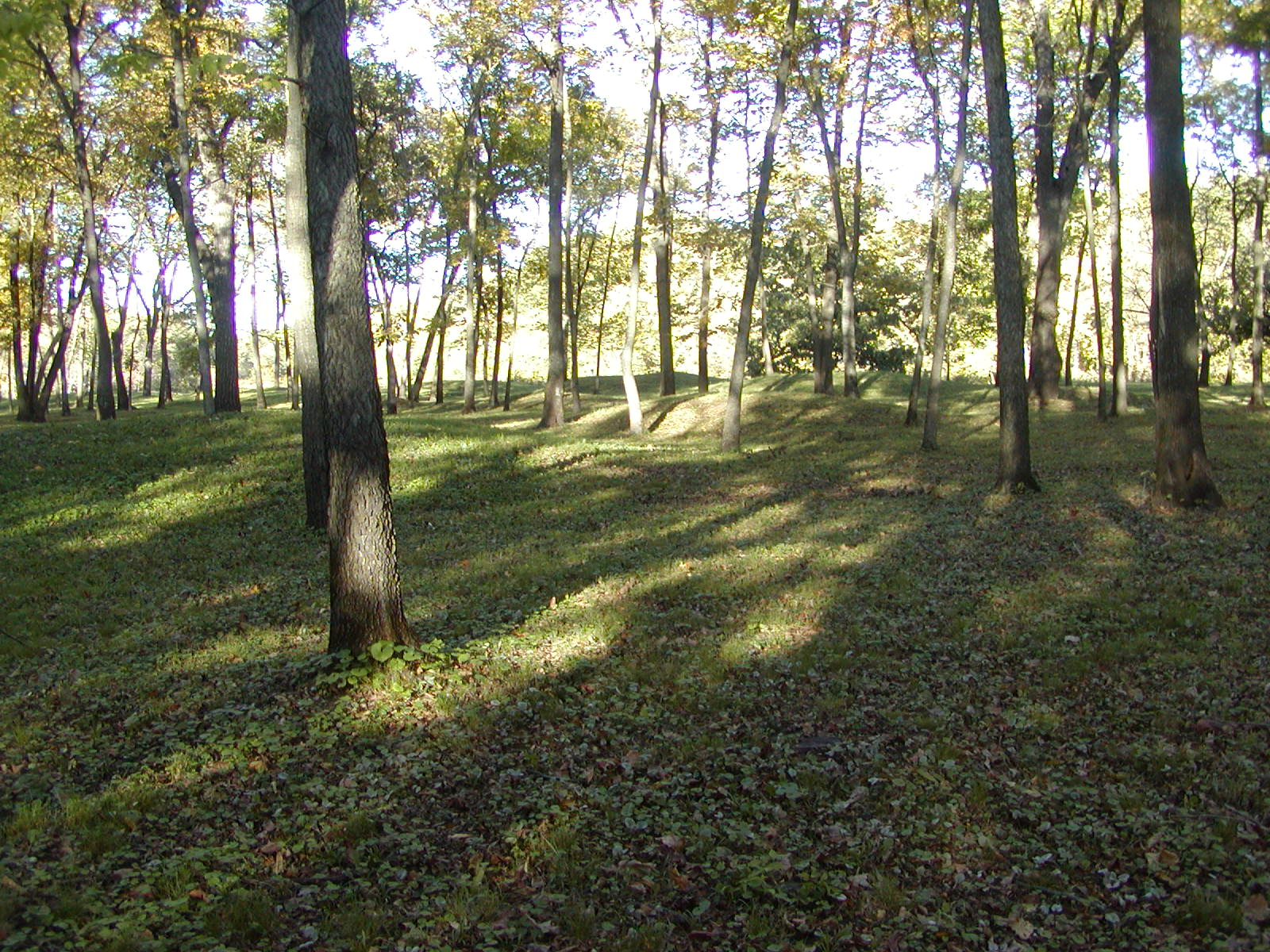
Woodland conical mounds at Effigy Mounds National Monument, Sny Magill Unit, Clayton County, Iowa

== Public access ==
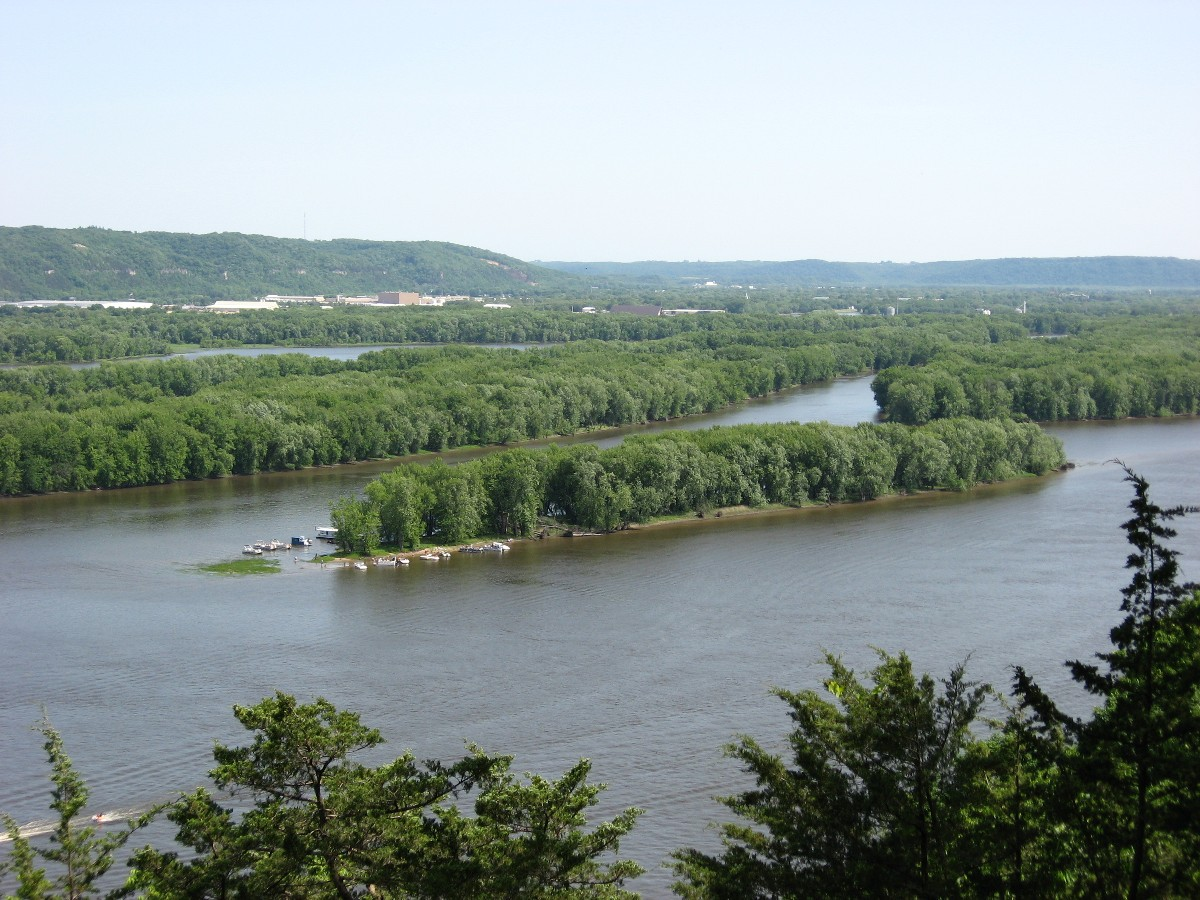
View of the Mississippi River and western Wisconsin from Effigy Mounds National Monument in 2007

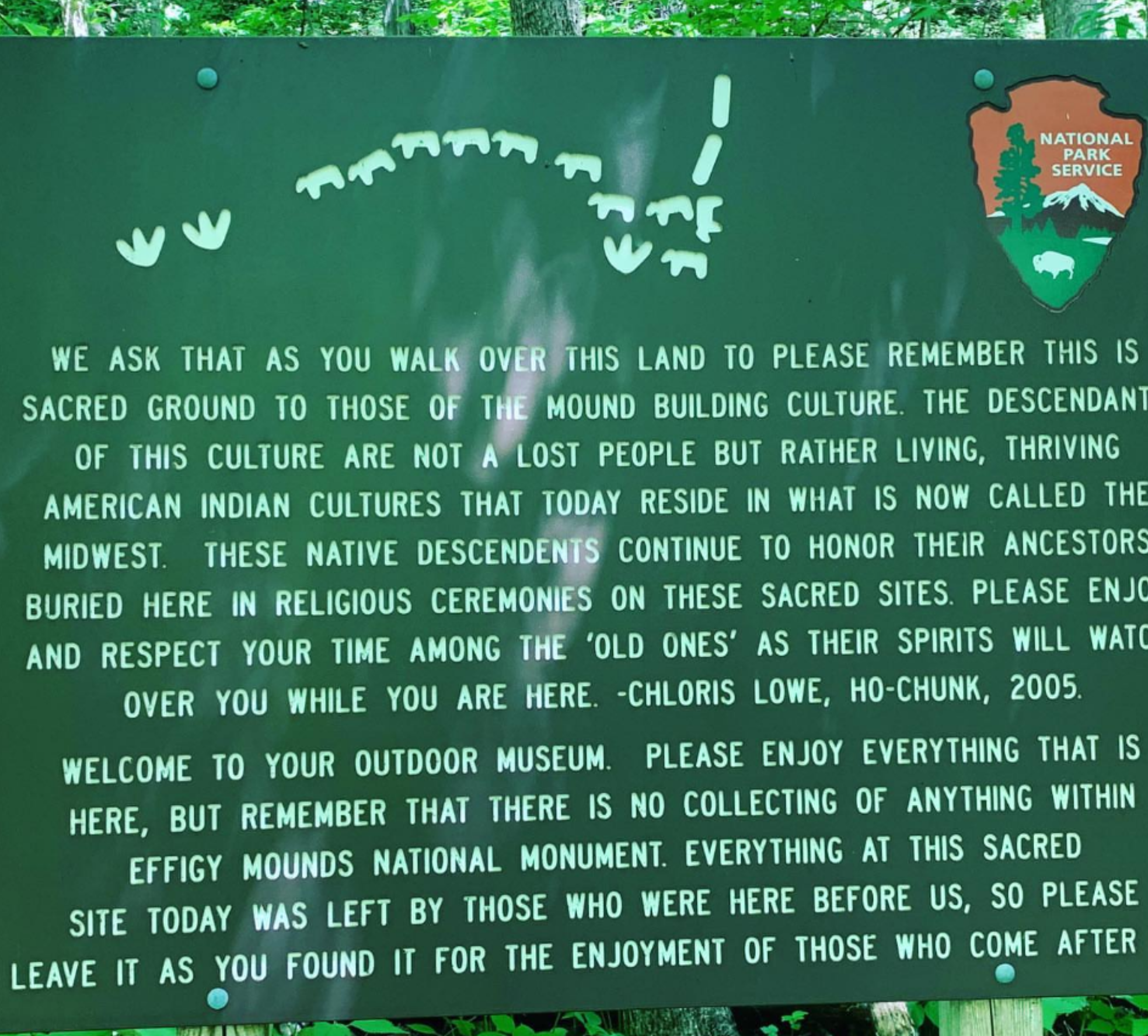
Sign describing the sacred nature of the Native American Effigy Mounds at the beginning of the trailhead at Effigy Mounds NM, Iowa.

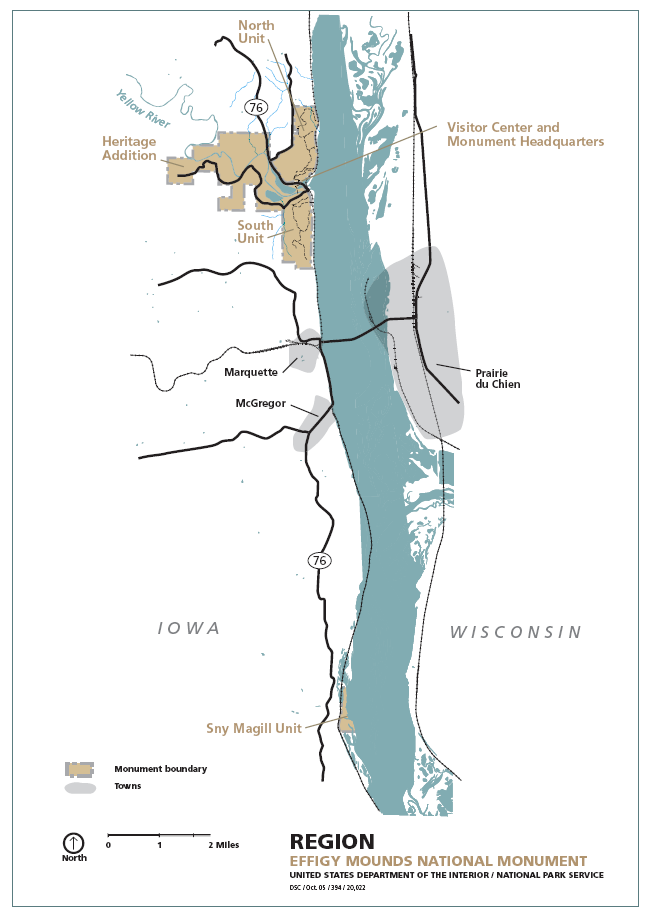
Map of Effigy Mounds National Monument and the surrounding, area

The visitor center, located at the park entrance, contains museum exhibits highlighting archaeological and natural specimens, an auditorium, and book sales outlet. The park has 14 miles of hiking trails. No paved public automobile access roads exist in the park. Rangers give guided hikes and prehistoric tool demonstrations that are scheduled and advertised, mid-June through Labor Day weekend. Educational programs are presented on- and off-site by appointment.

Natural features in the monument include forests, tallgrass prairies, wetlands and rivers. There are no lodging or camping facilities in the park. Camping is available at nearby Pikes Peak State Park and Yellow River State Forest in Iowa; there is also Wyalusing State Park in Wisconsin. Various primitive campgrounds exist in the area as well. The national monument is quite close to the town of Marquette, Iowa, and is just across the Mississippi River from the city of Prairie du Chien, Wisconsin, where ample motel and gambling-boat facilities exist.

Effigy Mounds was proclaimed a National Monument on October 25, 1949. Charles R. Keyes, head of the Iowa Archaeological Survey, and Ellison Orr, chief field supervisor for the Iowa Archaeological Survey, worked to survey and map the area, and to establish its significance for preservation.

== Driftless Area ==
The Effigy Mounds National Monument is noted for being in the Driftless Area, an area of North America which escaped glaciation during the last ice age. The adjacent Driftless Area National Wildlife Refuge takes its name from this region.

The Park Service writes:

Patchy remnants of Pre-Illinoian glacial drift more than 500,000 years old recently have been discovered in the area. Unlike the rest of Iowa, the Paleozoic Plateau was bypassed by the last of the Pleistocene glaciers (the Wisconsin), allowing the region's fast cutting streams to expose and carve out deep channels in the bedrock-dominated terrain. The area is characterized by thin loess soil cover, isolated patches of glacial drift, deeply entrenched river valleys, and karst (sinkholes, caves, and springs) topography.

== Conservation issues ==
From 1999 to 2009, Superintendent Phyllis Ewing "oversaw more than $3 million in illegal construction of boardwalks, trails and other structures that damaged irreplaceable archaeological artifacts". She failed to conduct consultation with affiliated American Indian tribes and follow procedures of the National Historic Preservation Act and other statutes. The Park Service conducted an internal investigation, finding numerous violations but no intent to damage the park.

In July 2016, Thomas Munson, Superintendent for 20 years of the Effigy Mounds National Monument, was sentenced to several days in prison after pleading guilty to stealing bones in 1990 of 41 ancient Native Americans from the holdings of the site's museum. The remains, from people who lived between 700 and 2,500 years ago, had been excavated along with artifacts from burial mounds at the park. Munson was attempting to evade the proposed provisions of the Native American Graves Protection and Repatriation Act (NAGPRA), which was passed by Congress that year. The act provides for artifacts and bones to be returned or repatriated by governmental agencies and other institutions to tribes who are affiliated with the peoples who buried the items. Tracing the bones could have demonstrated a link to the affiliated tribes and required return of both the remains and related artifacts from grave goods; without that evidence, most of the artifacts had been retained by the park.

The government conducted a five-year investigation through the US Attorney's Office, following questions raised in 2011 by Iowa Tribe of Kansas and Nebraska member Patt Murphy. As tribal representative under NAGPRA to receive "remains and funerary objects for repatriation and reburial", he had requested an inventory from the national monument of all remains and goods, which they could not provide. Murphy has since praised the work of the US Attorney's Office and others in this case. Munson was sentenced to a year of home detention, 10 weekends in jail, and paying "$108,905 in restitution for the damage he caused to the bones and a $3,000 fine".

Jim Nepstad, who was appointed superintendent at the monument in 2011, worked to restore the disturbed areas of the park. He also worked to rebuild the Park Service's standing with area residents and members of the site's affiliated American Indian tribes. He was featured in the documentary In Effigy.

In 2022, archaeologist Susan Snow was appointed superintendent of the monument. That same year, the National Park Service and leaders of the Iowa Tribe of Kansas and Nebraska (ITKN) signed a first-of-its-kind agreement establishing the first Tribal Sister Park relationship between a U.S. national park and a Tribal Nation’s National Park.

== See also ==
- Effigy Mounds National Monument Review Team Report
- Iowa archaeology
- Native American tribes in Iowa
- Indian Mounds Park (disambiguation)
- List of burial mounds in the United States
- List of national monuments of the United States
- Marching Bear Group
