= Beattie Park Mound Group =

Archaeological site in Illinois, United States

- U.S. National Register of Historic Places
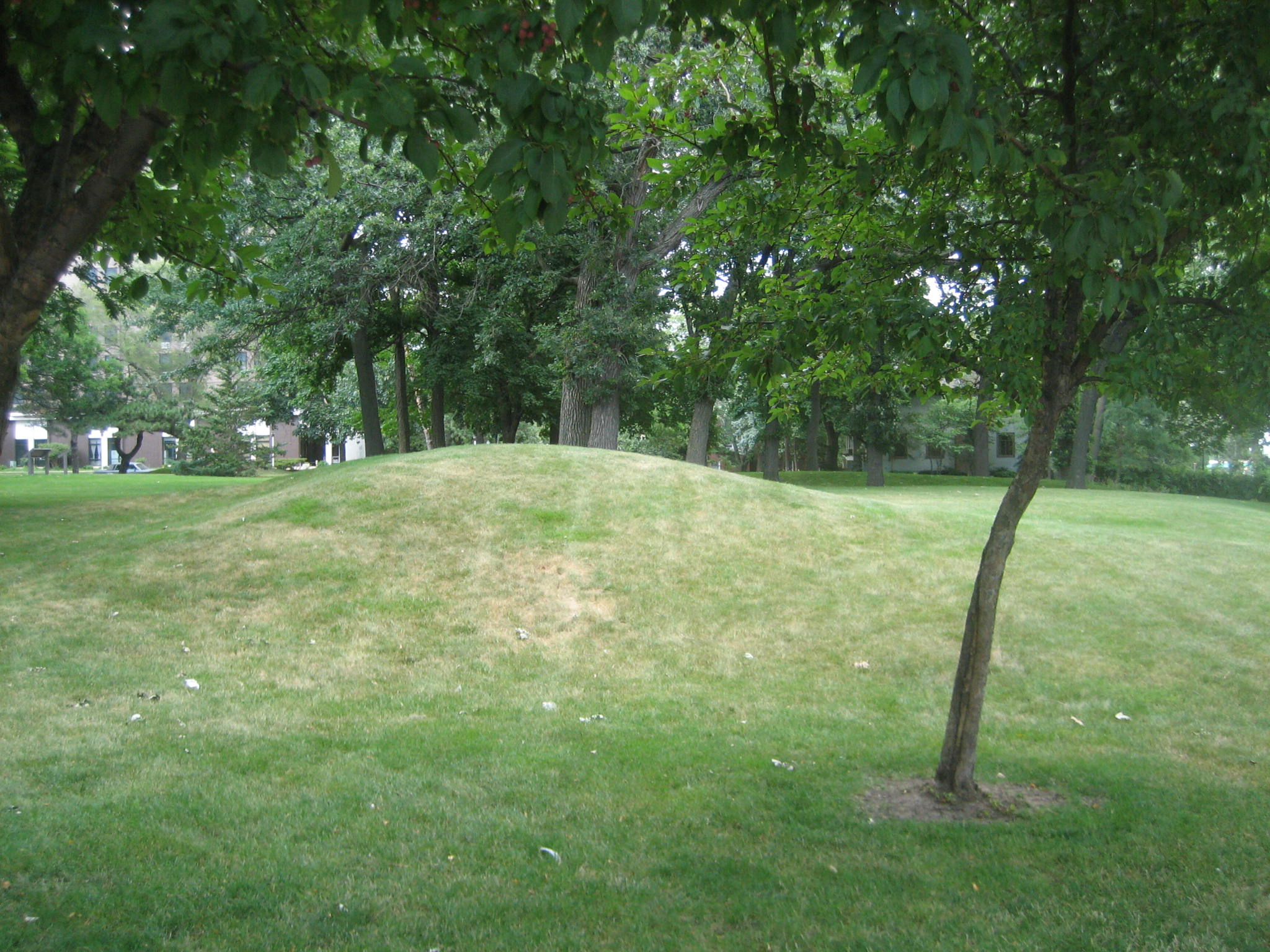
- Location: Rockford, Winnebago County, Illinois, USA
- Coordinates: 42°16′27″N 89°5′28″W
- Area: 7.5 acres (30,000 m^{2})
- Built: c. 300-1100 C.E.
- Architectural style: Effigy mound
- NRHP reference No.: 91000084
- Added to NRHP: February 27, 1991

The Beattie Park Mound Group is a grouping of Late Woodland period Indian mounds located in downtown Rockford, Illinois, United States.

== Location ==
The Beattie Park Mound Group is located in downtown Rockford, Illinois' Beattie Park. It consists of three conical mounds (one outside the park boundaries), an effigy mound in the shape of a turtle, and a linear mound. Beattie Park is north of Park Avenue and south of Mound Avenue, but there is one mound remnant in front of the house at 509 Indian Terrace. On its west, the park is bounded by Main Street and to its east lies the Rock River. Mounds are the most visible evidence of cultures that lived for hundreds of years in the mix of biomes in northern Illinois.

Mound groups in eastern North America are primarily located along waterways, as is the case with the Beattie Park Mounds. Effigy (animal-shaped) mounds are found in Wisconsin and adjoining parts of neighboring states south of the conifer hardwood forests and stretch from eastern Iowa to Lake Michigan

== History ==
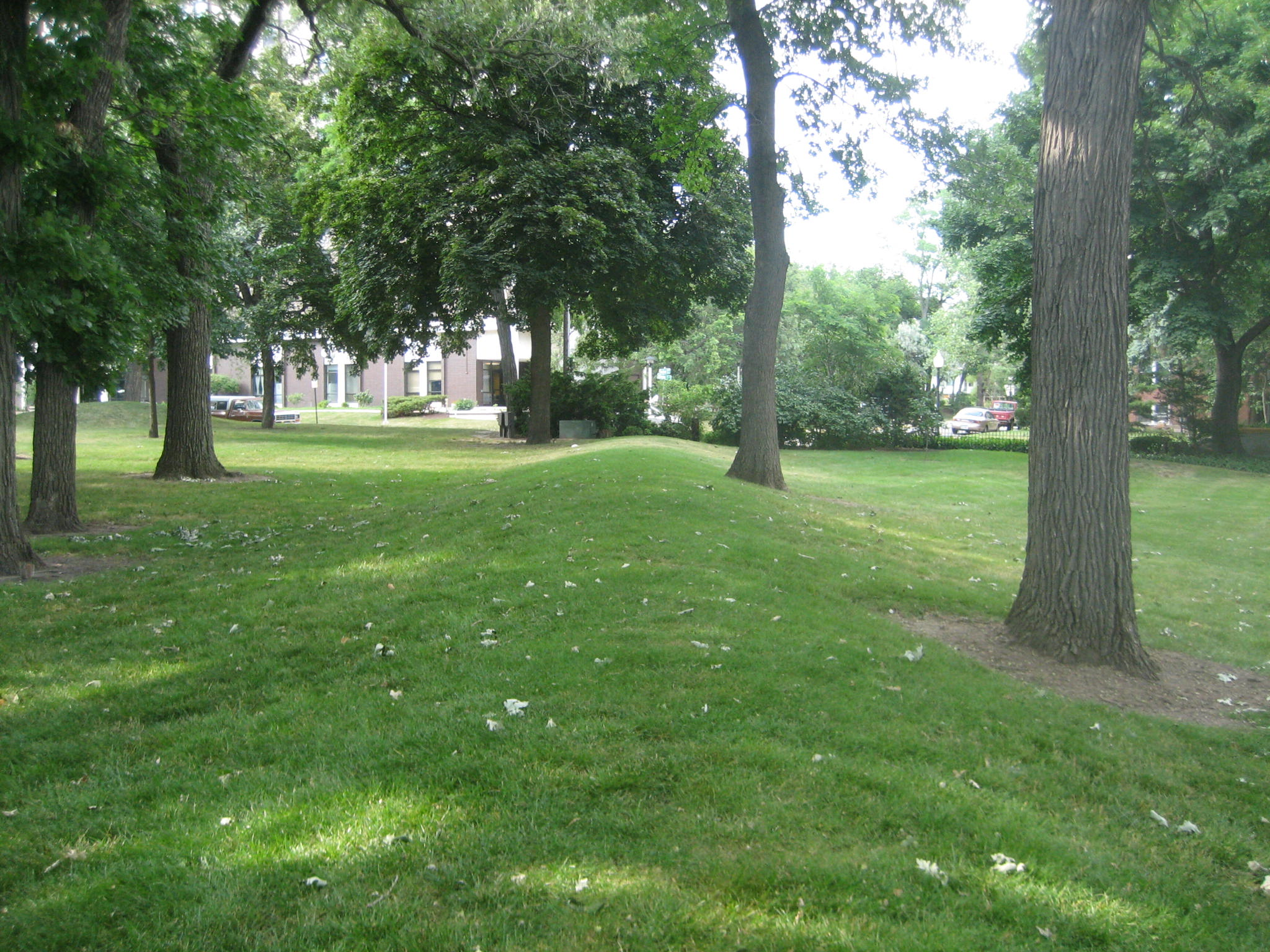
The linear mound of the Beattie Park Group.

The mounds and mound remnants in Beattie Park date from an era during the Late Woodland known as the Effigy mound Period. This period spanned from about 700-1100 C.E. in the Upper Mississippi River Valley in parts of Iowa, Illinois, Wisconsin and Minnesota. Native American Mound builders were not a single culture but several groups that interacted and made artifacts and structures such as mounds in similar ways. The mounds in Beattie Park probably date from the early part of the time period 700-1100, when most of the effigy mounds seem to have been built.

The grouping represents the remnants of a cluster that originally included nine conical mounds, a linear mound, an earthen embankment, and two effigy mounds: a bird and a turtle. Through the years, some of the mounds were destroyed or disturbed. When Sears now the home of Rockford Art Museum constructed a parking lot on North Main Street in the mid-1950s one of the conical mounds was destroyed. A bird effigy was destroyed when the North Main Manor apartment building was under construction across Park Avenue from the mounds.

== See also ==
- Indian Mounds Park (disambiguation)
- Sinnissippi Mounds
- List of archaeological sites on the National Register of Historic Places in Illinois
