= Indian Mounds Park =

The term Indian Mounds Park may refer to:

- Beattie Park Mound Group in Rockford, Illinois
- Effigy Mounds National Monument, Iowa
- Indian Mound Park in Dauphin Island, Alabama
- Indian Mound Park in Ortona, Florida
- Indian Mounds Park in Quincy, Illinois
- Indian Mounds Park in Saint Paul, Minnesota
- Indian Mounds Park in Whitewater, Wisconsin
- Indian Temple Mound and Museum in Fort Walton Beach, Florida
- Lake Jackson Mounds Archaeological State Park, Tallahassee, Florida
- Newark Earthworks in Newark, Ohio
- Ormond Mound in Ormond Beach, Florida
- Pompano Beach Mound in Pompano Beach, Florida
- Serpent Mound in Adams County, Ohio
- Sheboygan Indian Mound Park in Sheboygan, Wisconsin
- Velda Mound in Tallahassee, Florida
