= Rock Eagle =

- Rock Eagle Site
- U.S. National Register of Historic Places
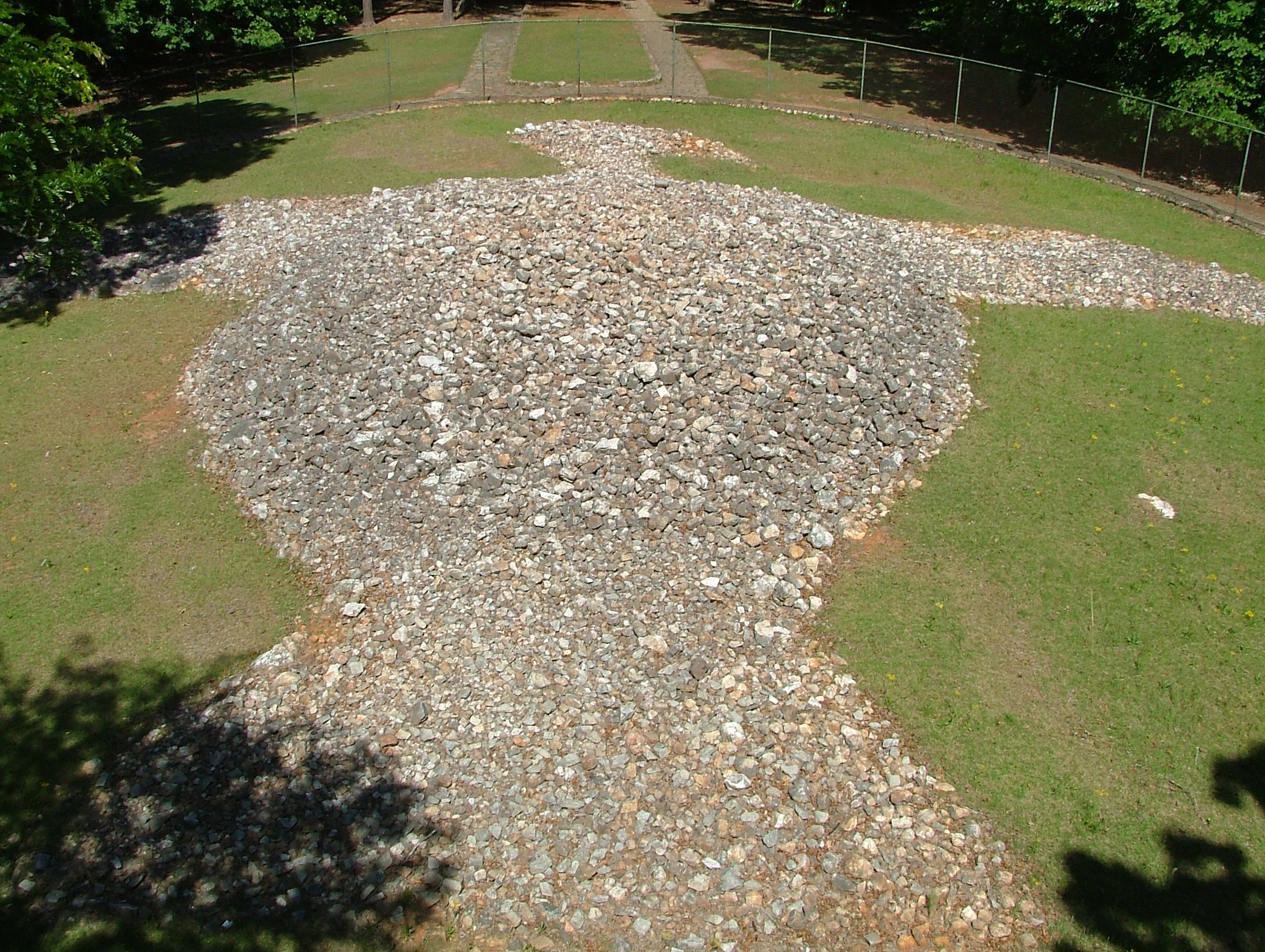
- Rock Eagle Effigy Mound, viewed from adjacent observation tower, August 26, 2007

- Location within Georgia Location within the United States
- Nearest city: Eatonton, Georgia
- NRHP reference No.: 78001001

Rock Eagle Effigy Mound is an archaeological site in Putnam County, Georgia, US, estimated to have been constructed c. 1000 BC to AD 1000 (1,000 to 3,000 years ago). The earthwork was built up of thousands of pieces of quartzite laid in the mounded shape of a large bird (102 ft long from head to tail, and 120 ft wide from wing tip to wing tip). Although it is most often referred to as an eagle, scholars do not know exactly what type of bird the original builders intended to portray. It is listed on the National Register of Historic Places (NRHP) because of its significance. The University of Georgia administers the site. It uses much of the adjoining land for a 4-H camp, with cottages and other buildings, and day and residential environmental education.

What prompted the early inhabitants of Middle Georgia, who lived in a time long before the rise of the later Mississippian, Creek and Cherokee cultures, to build these massive effigy mounds is still something of a mystery. They obviously hold ceremonial significance and the Rock Eagle seems to have been expanded from a large dome-shaped central mound.

== Archaeology ==
Only two such bird effigy mounds have been found east of the Mississippi River. The other, known as Rock Hawk, is also located in Putnam County, approximately thirteen miles to the southeast. (33°20.693′N 83°10.502′W)

Rock Eagle was once thought to be as much as 5,000 years old. While there is strong evidence that the area was occupied by Archaic Indians at that time, scholars no longer believe that they created the mound. Current archaeology suggests the mound was built between 1,000 and 3,000 years ago by Woodland Indians. These Native Americans may have been part of the Adena or Hopewell cultures. It is more likely that they represented a unique group. Rock Eagle is the next oldest Indian mound in Georgia after the Sapelo Shell Ring Complex.

Early settlers of the region thought it might cover some fantastic buried treasure and dug into it from time to time, but 20th century archaeologists found only that the eagle was built atop a natural rock outcrop. Theories as to the reasons for its construction currently range from the need for some central burial place by the ancient inhabitants of the area to the possibility that the people of Rock Eagle were sending a message to the gods.

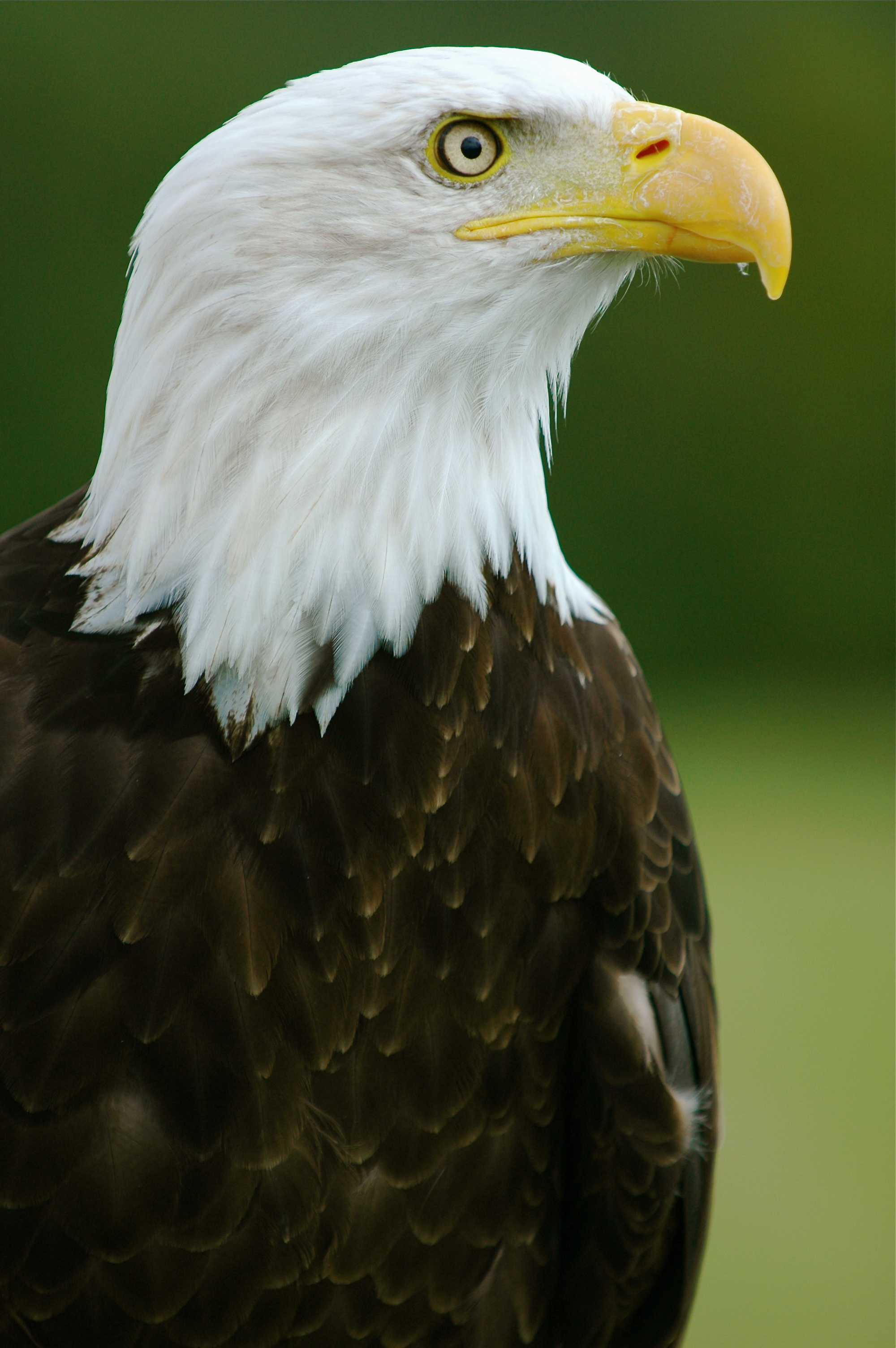
The bald eagle was considered to be in direct contact with the spirit upper world. Many southeastern tribes were thought to be "sun" worshippers.

The mound depicts a bird with a large beak and a fan tail. Archeologist Charles T. Hyatt produced the earliest measurements in 1877. It measures 120 feet from head to tail and 102 feet from wingtip to wingtip. The bird's head is often described as being turned to the east (see Marker) "to face the rising sun", perhaps to suggest a cosmological significance to its placement. However, the bird's head actually faces south by southeast, and its beak points almost due south. The rocks comprising the bird's chest are piled eight to ten feet high, while the wings, tail, and head rise lower. Archeologists found non-indigenous clay on the mound, suggesting that materials were brought to it from other areas during construction.

Early archaeologists also found evidence of a human cremation on the mound, as well as a projectile point. Some scholars believe the mound resembles a buzzard or vulture more than an eagle. As the buzzard was a symbol of death among some of the indigenous peoples, it would have been a fitting image for a burial mound.

Scholarly study of the Rock Eagle Effigy Mound began by 1877, when noted archaeologist Dr. Vincenzo Petrullo published measurements of the image. University of Georgia archaeologist A. R. Kelly excavated much of the site during the 1930s. Because of this excavation, a single set of human and animal bones remain and a projectile point was found that may or may not be related to the effigy. Archaeological excavations into the mound over the years have found a surprisingly small number of artifacts other than the stones from which it was built. A 1950s research project did find a single quartz tool at Rock Eagle, along with evidence of cremated human burials in the mound. Otherwise, the structure has revealed very little about its intended purpose.

The property was sold to the United States government during this time by Florence Scott. In association with the University of Georgia, the Works Progress Administration (WPA) constructed a granite tower at the foot of the effigy. This made an "aerial" view of the site possible for visitors. In 1954 Kelly reported that both Rock Eagle and Rock Hawk showed indications of having been enclosed by a wall of material similar to the rocks used to construct the effigies. This, perhaps, associates them with the builders of similar walls at Stone Mountain (destroyed, 1923) and Fort Mountain (still standing). An extensive renovation was completed on this site, removing plants from the mound and replacing rocks that were scattered nearby. The mound rises 10 feet above ground level and consists of thousands of small to medium-size rocks.

The stone tower built by the CCC workers in the 1930s provides views of the Rock Eagle. A paved pathway circles the effigy and there are interpretive panels to explain the significance of the site. The U.S. Department of the Interior listed Rock Eagle on the National Register of Historic Places in 1987.

Access to the mound itself is strictly prohibited, and the site is surrounded by a tall fence. The University of Georgia administers the site. It uses much of the adjoining land for a 4-H camp, with cottages and other buildings, and day and residential environmental education.

Visitors are permitted to visit the mound free of charge. The site is located adjacent to State Route 441 between the cities of Madison and Eatonton. The park is 1500 acres in total.

== Marker ==
In 1940 a state heritage society put a bronze marker near the head of the image. The text reads:

ROCK EAGLE MOUND

MOUND OF PREHISTORIC ORIGIN, BELIEVED TO BE CEREMONIAL MOUND, MADE WITH WHITE QUARTZ ROCKS IN THE SHAPE OF AN EAGLE, HEAD TURNED TO EAST, LENGTH 102 FEET, SPREAD OF WINGS 120 FEET, DEPTH OF BREAST 8 FEET. ONLY TWO SUCH CONFIGURATIONS DISCOVERED EAST OF THE MISSISSIPPI RIVER. BOTH ARE IN PUTNAM COUNTY.

"TREAD SOFTLY HERE WHITE MAN FOR LONG ERE YOU CAME STRANGE RACES LIVED, FOUGHT AND LOVED."

ERECTED BY THE GEORGIA SOCIETY COLONIAL DAMES OF THE XVII CENTURY

JUNE 1940

== Legacy ==
The adjoining Rock Eagle 4-H Center is named after the effigy. It uses an image of the mound on the masthead of Wingspan, the center's newsletter.

== Gallery ==
Rock Eagle Effigy Mound

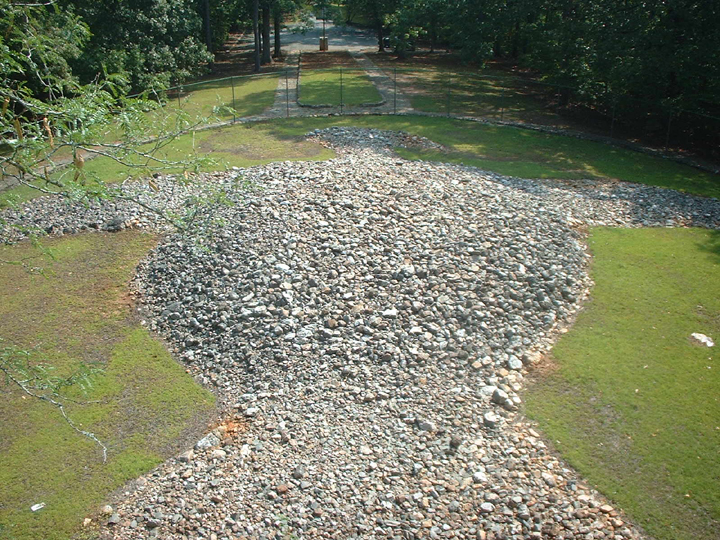
Mound viewed from adjacent observation tower

Bronze marker at the effigy's head

Mound and observation tower viewed through protective fence

The effigy's tail, viewed from the foot of the observation tower

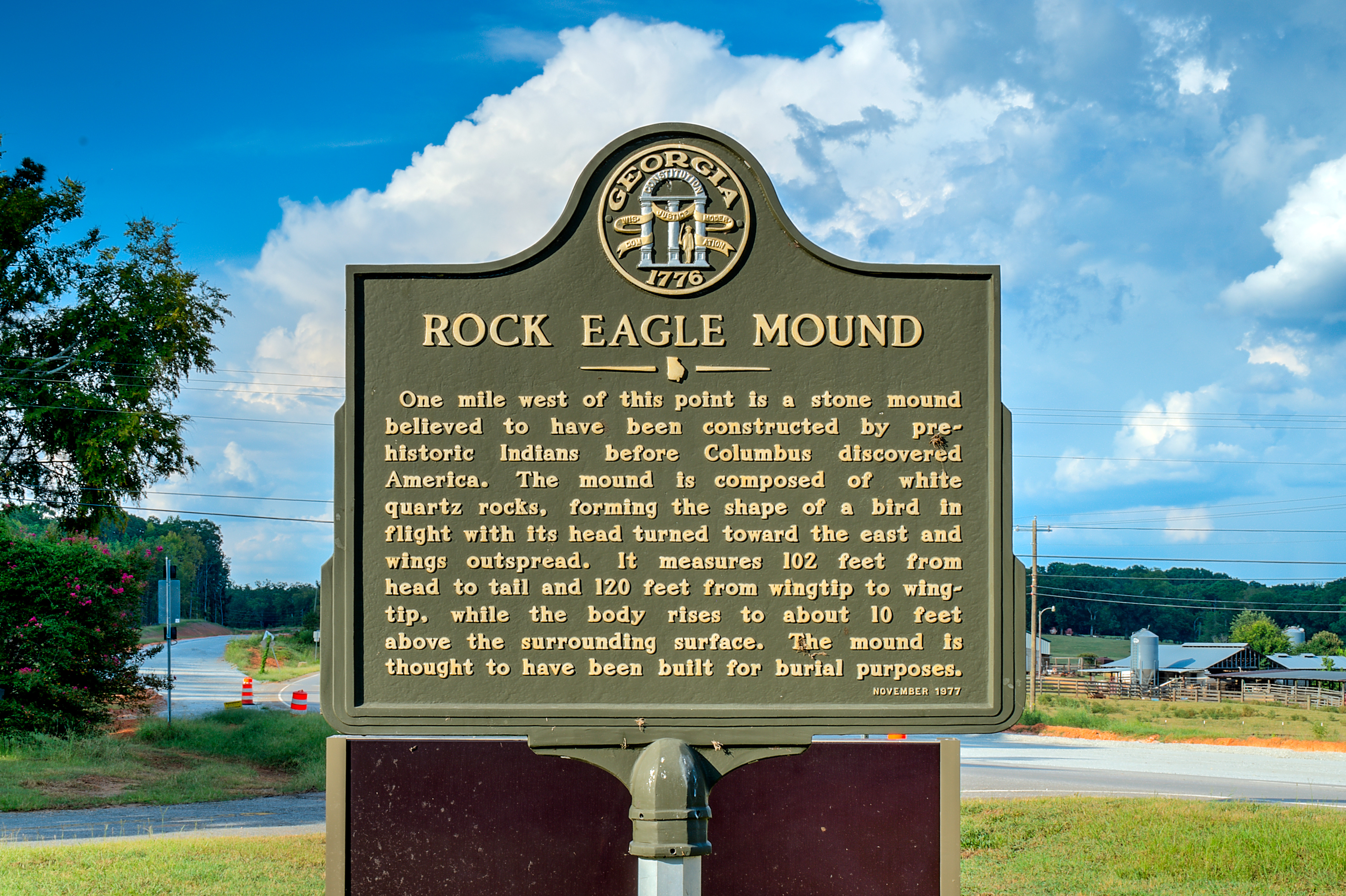
Historical Marker

== See also ==
- Rock Hawk Effigy Mound
