= Rock Hawk =

Archaeological site in Georgia, US

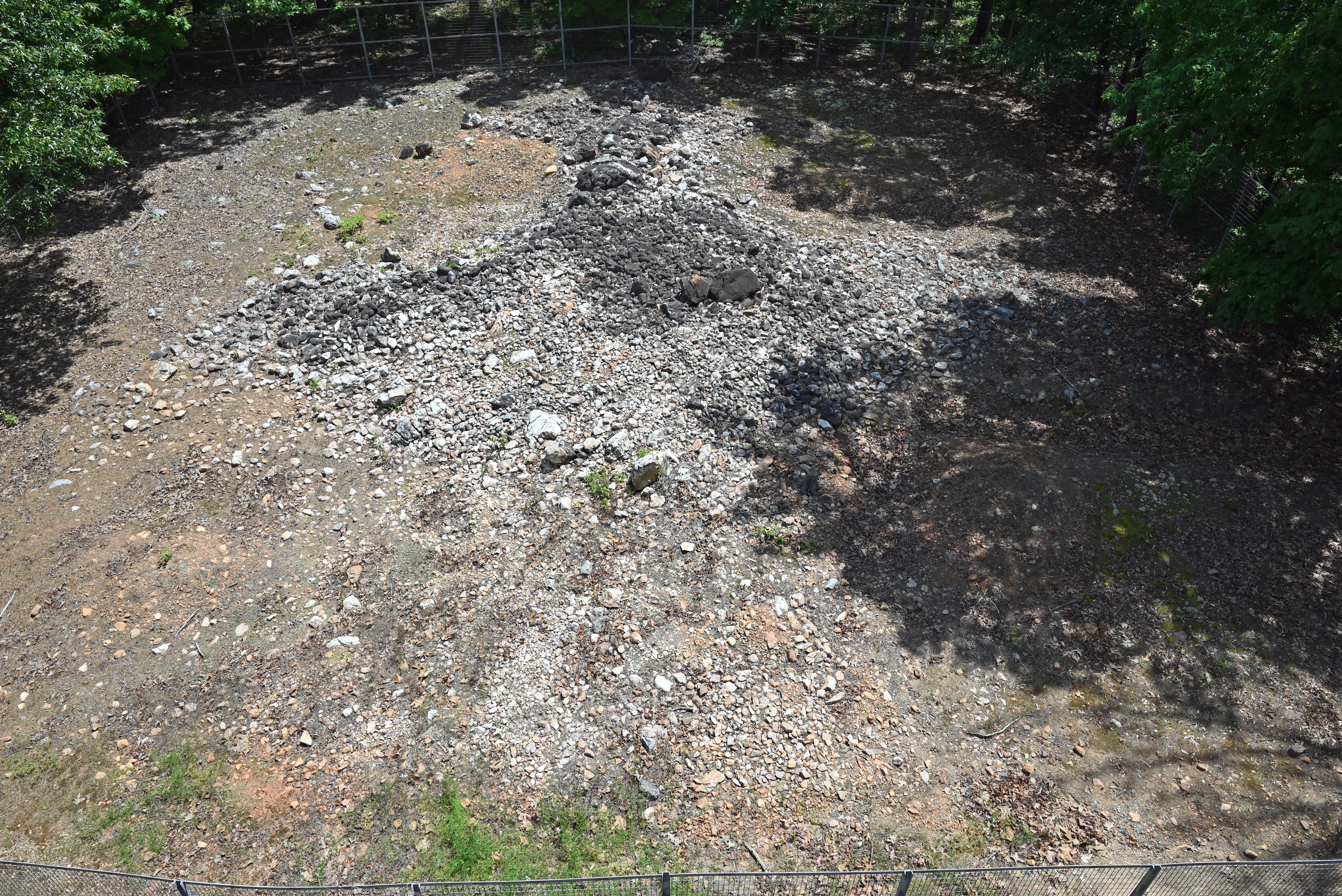
Photo from observation tower

Rock Hawk Effigy Mound is an archaeological site in Putnam County, Georgia, United States. It consists of thousands of pieces of quartzite laid in the shape of a large bird. Although it is most often referred to as a hawk, scholars do not know exactly what type of bird the original builders intended to portray.

Only two such effigy mounds have been found east of the Mississippi River. The other, known as Rock Eagle, is also located in Putnam County, approximately thirteen miles to the northwest. (33°25.045′N 83°23.288′W) The physical condition of Rock Hawk is far below that of its 'sister' site. Viewers must use a degree of imagination to see a bird — let alone a hawk — in the remains. Scholars do not know if there was greater degradation of the Rock Hawk site, greater preservation or reconstruction at Rock Eagle (which is by far the more famous of the two and a greater 'attraction'), or a combination of these or other factors.

Current archaeology suggests that the site was built between 1,000 and 3,000 years ago by Woodland Indians. These Native Americans may have been part of the Adena or Hopewell cultures, although it is more likely that they represented a unique group.

To protect the site, access to the mound is prohibited, and it is surrounded by a tall fence. The Georgia Power company manages the area. It maintains an easily accessible parking area near the mound, as well as a network of hiking trails and other recreational amenities in the area. Visitors are permitted to visit the mound free of charge. The site is located along Wallace Dam Road, off State Route 16, several miles east of Eatonton, near the shores of the manmade Lake Oconee.

== Gallery ==
Rock Hawk Effigy Mound

Rock Hawk effigy mound

another view of the mound

the 'head' of the effigy

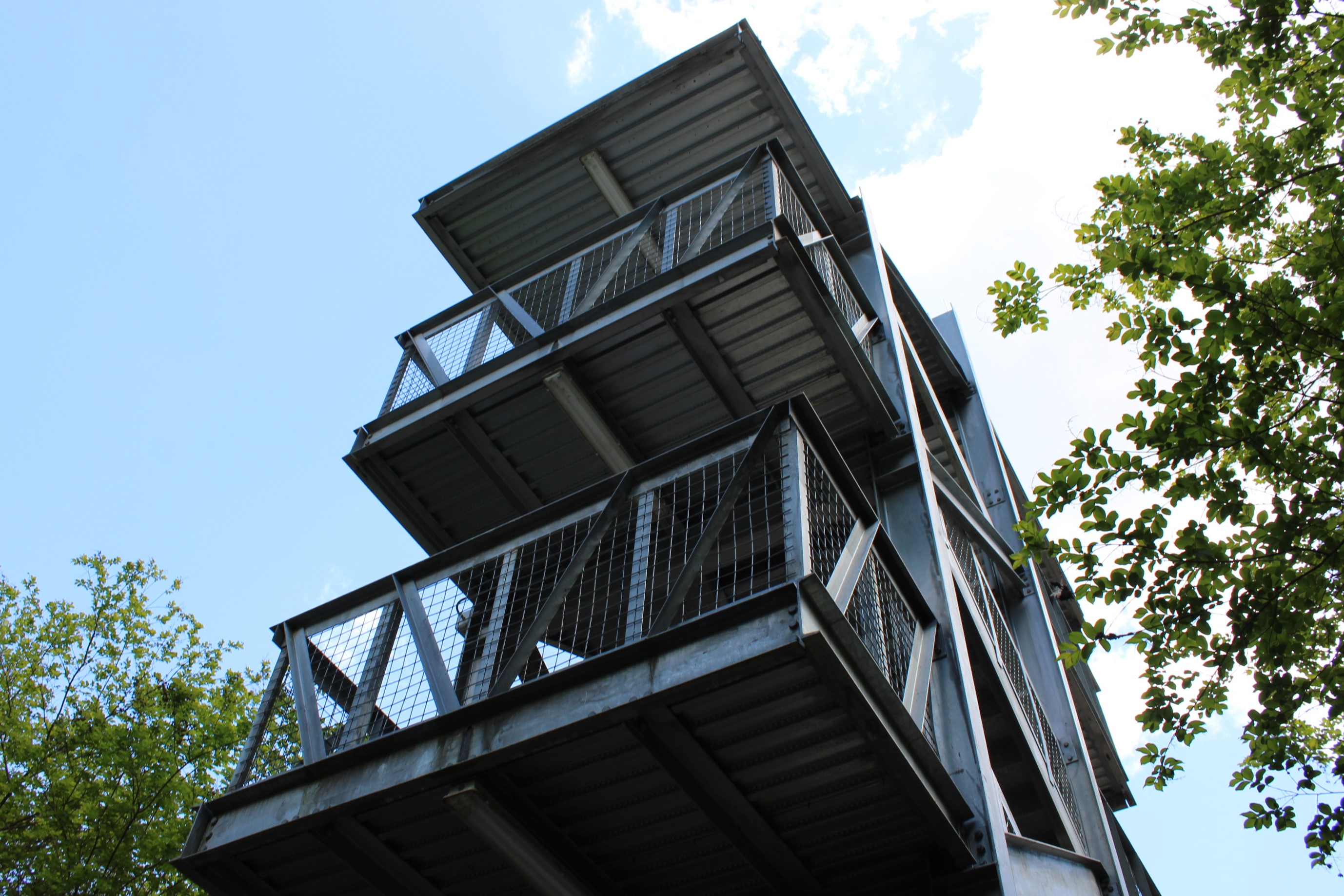
The nearby observation tower
