= Cane Island Site =

Archaeological site in Putnam County, Georgia

Cane Island Site is a destroyed archaeological site located in Putnam County, Georgia, along the Oconee River at Long Shoals. It is considered one of the earliest Native American farming villages in Georgia, dating to the mid 3rd century BC. It is part of the lower Piedmont. The site number is 9Pm209. The site was first excavated by William Dean Wood in August 1977. The Cane Island site is a large site at least 200m x 25m in size. Wood found two small houses which he used to study the concept of household. A small area of each of the houses was excavated and neither one was totally excavated. The larger of the two was estimated to be 7m long by 5m wide. Central hearths were found in the houses, along with charred wood and fire cracked rocks. Because of the size of the site, it is unknown what percentage of it got excavated. The Cane Island site is from the later part of the early Woodland Period and based on Wood's work, it was determined that there had been discontinuous occupation of the site for more than 9000 years.

The site was clearly stratified with well preserved post holes, stone hearths, and storage pits. Several post holes arranged in a circle or oval suggest the existence of more houses and structures.
