= Fort Walton Beach Heritage Park & Cultural Center =

Archaeological site and museum in Florida, U.S.

Coordinates: 30°24′15″N 86°36′26″W

The Fort Walton Beach Heritage Park & Cultural Center is located on U.S. Highway 98 in the center of historic Fort Walton Beach, Florida. This archaeological site features multiple museums that showcase local history from 14,000 BCE through the 1950s. The cultural exhibits and landscape tell the story of 12,000 years of human occupation. Admission for all museums in the complex is taken at the Indian Temple Mound Museum building. Other museums and attractions on-site include the Indian Temple Mound Museum, Camp Walton Schoolhouse Museum, Garnier Post Office Museum, Civil War Exhibits Building, and Fort Walton Mound. All museums are located in close proximity to the base of the Fort Walton Mound.

== History ==
The Indian Temple Mound Museum was opened in 1962 as “the first municipally owned and operated museum in the state of Florida." According to the city's official website, “Over 1,000 artifacts of stone, bone, clay, and shell are here, as well as one of the finest collections of prehistoric ceramics in the Southeastern United States. Exhibits also include artifacts from the European Explorers, local pirates, and early settlers." The “Fort Walton Culture” was named by American archaeologist Gordon Willey, based on his work at the Fort Walton Mound site near the Indian Temple Museum in the 1930s. This term refers to a late prehistoric Native American people that flourished in southeastern North American from approximately 1200-1500 CE. Archaeologists have now come to believe that the Fort Walton site was actually built and used by people of the contemporaneous Pensacola culture. The Heritage Park & Cultural Center is currently classified as a Museum Assessment Program (MAP) Museum according to the American Alliance of Museums (AAM). Today, the Heritage Park and Cultural Center is largely self-sufficient under the ownership of the City of Fort Walton Beach. Most of its funding comes from the city itself, the museum shop, donations, or fundraising events.

== Mission ==
The mission of the Heritage Park & Cultural Center is outlined on the official city of Fort Walton Beach website:

We are an educational and cultural institution of long standing traditions. It is our mission to preserve, interpret and present the prehistory and history of the Fort Walton Beach community and the Northwest Florida area from 12,000 B.C. through the 1950’s. We serve students, citizens and visitors through exhibits, educational programs, publications and special events.

== Programs ==
As an educational and cultural site, this institution serves students, residents, and visitors through educational programs, publications, and special events. The Education Staff provides on-site educational programming for both school and community groups. Specifically, the staff works with local teachers and students on their social studies curriculum. For example, they offer educational field trips that serve as extensions of classroom activities through hands-on learning experiences. According to their website, “Interactive programs are specially geared for specific age groups and support the Florida Sunshine State Standards and serve to increase historical knowledge while stimulating student interest in social studies, local history and archaeology." Reservations for field trips or group tours may be made on their website. Programs at the museum typically feature a presentation by a trained museum educator, a tour of the artifact gallery with hands-on history displays, and a tour of the grounds. Programming presentations vary depending on age groups or learning objectives. The website outlines different presentations already designed for students in preschool, kindergarten, first grade and second grade, and third to fifth grades. Specialized classes are also available for subjects of interest to older grades, mixed grades, or adult groups.

== Sites ==
=== Indian Temple Mound Museum ===
The city-owned and operated Indian Temple Mound Museum features pre-Columbian artifacts found on site and from other locations, as well as a variety of exhibits on later Native American and Floridian history including artifacts from the European Explorers, local pirates and early settlers. The address is 139 Miracle Strip Pkwy SE, near the intersection of State Road 85 and U.S. Route 98, in the Florida Panhandle. The museum was first opened in 1962 and the current location was opened in 1972.

=== Camp Walton Schoolhouse Museum ===
The Camp Walton Schoolhouse Museum was the original one-room schoolhouse built in 1911. It opened for use for the community children from 1912 to 1936. Opened in 1976, the museum features early-20th-century desks and education items.

=== Garnier Post Office Museum ===
The Garnier Post Office Museum is an original small rural post office that displays the postal history of Camp Walton and Fort Walton with emphasis from 1900 to the 1950s. The site also served as a voting location. The museum opened in 1988.

=== Civil War Exhibits Building ===
Opened in 2010, the Civil War Exhibits Building features displays about Florida's history during the American Civil War.

=== Fort Walton Mound ===
The Fort Walton Mound (8OK6) is an archaeological site located in present-day Fort Walton Beach, Florida. The large platform mound was built about 850 CE by the Pensacola culture, a local form of the Mississippian culture. Because of its significance, the mound was designated a National Historic Landmark in 1964.
