= Indian Mounds Park (Whitewater, Wisconsin) =

United States historic place

Coordinates: 42°49′57″N 88°45′54″W

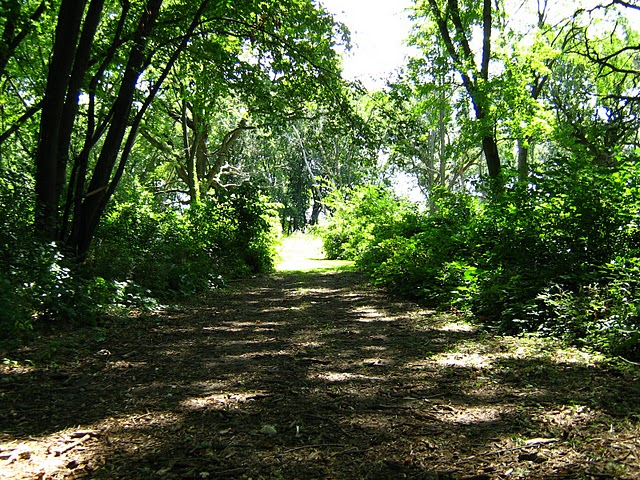
A walking path in the Effigy Mounds Park in 2008.

Whitewater Effigy Mounds Preserve (also known as The Indian Mounds Park or as the Maples Mounds Group) is a park operated by the city of Whitewater, Wisconsin. The 21.5-acre park is located on the west side of the city. It was added to the National Register of Historic Places in 1991.

== Description ==
Whitewater Effigy Mounds Preserve is located on the west side of Whitewater, Wisconsin near Indian Mounds Parkway and Wildwood Road. It is a prehistoric, Native American ceremonial and burial site that dates to between 200 and 1000 A.D. The park contains a collection of animal and geometric mounds. Located on the eastern bank of an old river bed, and among the park's thick native oak trees, the effigy mounds once included a community area with 30 circular huts, inhabited by the mound builders. The 12 (possibly 13) effigy mounds at the site are what survive of this village today. The site continues to be used for Native American ceremonial pow-wows. Entrance into the Effigy Mounds Park is free and open to the public daily.

== History ==
The Effigy Mounds Park in 1995 before recent efforts to clear the park's underbrush. This image displays some of the park's thick native oaks.

The Potawatomi people, after being displaced from their native lands further east, most likely in the mid-17th century during the Beaver Wars, settled in the area now known as Indian Mounds Park and near the Whitewater River, now Whitewater Creek. The area was given this name because of the white clay and sands that collect at the bottom of the river.

When the construction of a U.S. Route 12 in Wisconsin bypass threatened the mounds, a group of local residents convinced the Wisconsin Department of Transportation to preserve the mounds.

The site was added to the National Register of Historic Places in 1991.

== Restoration ==
After regular maintenance, efforts in the park have removed non-native species and other underbrush to return the park to its original state, that of an oak savanna.

Recent plans for the west side of Whitewater by the Whitewater Community Development Authority]show a possible expansion of the park that would include an area north of the park and south of West Main Street. It would include woodlands, wetlands, and space for a playground, playfield and trail. This expansion plan also includes degraded mound remnants southwest of the current park, which would provide a buffer to the existing mounds in the park.

== See also ==
- Mound
- Mound builder (people)
- Earthwork (archaeology)
- List of burial mounds in the United States
