= Fort Walton Mound =

- U.S. National Register of Historic Places
- U.S. National Historic Landmark
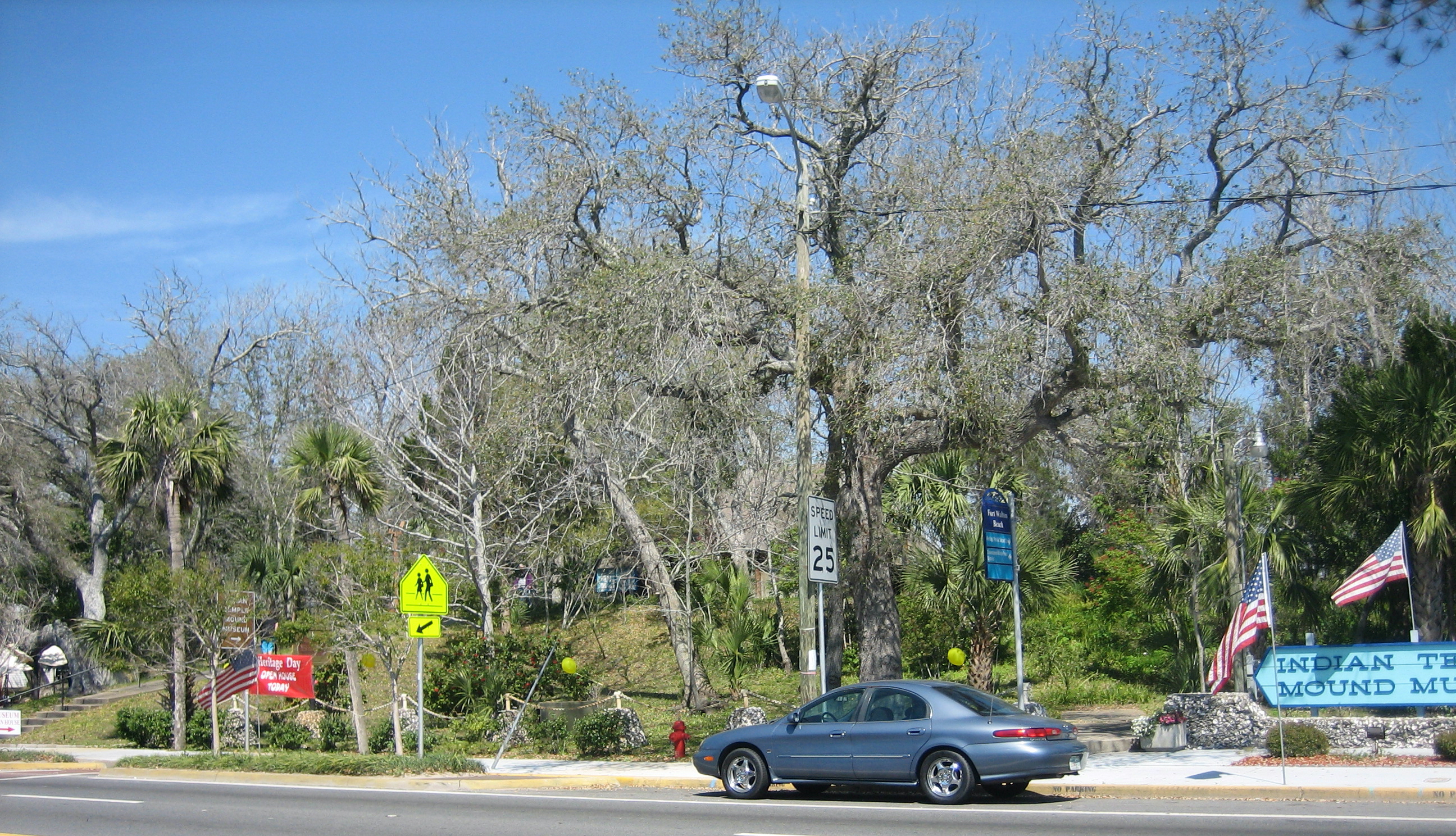
- Fort Walton Mound, in the Indian Temple Mound and Museum

- Location within Florida Location within the United States
- Location: Fort Walton Beach, Florida, USA
- Coordinates: 30°24′15.948″N 86°36′26.352″W
- NRHP reference No.: 66000268

Significant dates
- Added to NRHP: October 15, 1966
- Designated NHL: July 19, 1964

The Fort Walton Mound (8OK6) is an archaeological site located in present-day Fort Walton Beach, Florida, United States. The large platform mound was built about 850 CE by the Pensacola culture, a local form of the Mississippian culture. Because of its significance, the mound was designated a National Historic Landmark in 1964.

Still reduced by time, the massive mound is still 12 feet (3.7 m) high and 223 feet (68 m) wide at the base. It was an expression of a complex culture, built by a hierarchical society whose leaders planned and organized the labor of many workers for such construction. The mound served combined ceremonial, political and religious purposes. At the center of the village and its supporting agricultural lands, the mound served as the platform for the temple and residence of the chief. Successive leaders were buried in the mound and additional layers were added over time.

This is one of three surviving mound complexes in the panhandle, the others being Letchworth Mounds and Lake Jackson Mounds state parks.

== History ==
The Fort Walton Mound was probably built around 800 CE, although Charles H. Fairbanks who excavated the mound in 1960 believed it was built between 1500 and 1650 based on pottery sherds he uncovered and analyzed. The mound served as the ceremonial and political center of their chiefdom and probably the residence of the chief. It was also the burial ground of the elites in the society. Archaeological evidence suggests that several buildings once stood on top of the mound, perhaps at different times throughout its use. These buildings were probably done in the typical wattle and daub construction common among Southeastern Native American groups. By sometime in the late 1600s the mound was abandoned by its original builders and lay dormant in use until the area was reinhabited by white settlers in the mid 19th century.

The Confederate soldiers established "Camp Walton" at the base of Fort Walton Mound in 1861 during the Civil War to guard Santa Rosa Sound and Choctawhatchee Bay. As with many of Florida's mound structures, the Fort Walton Mound was first excavated by antiquarians and amateur archaeologists. The Walton Guard soldiers are the first recorded group to have excavated the mound. John Love McKinnon, a soldier with the Walton Guards at the time, wrote a description of their excavation in his book "History of Walton County." McKinnon noted that several human remains the soldiers unearthed were from large individuals and probably belonged to warriors as indicated by damage they observed on the skulls, thighs and arms bones consistent with hacking and blunt force trauma. He speculated that the area they dug into was once a charnel house. A couple decades after the Civil War, in 1883 S.T. Walker wrote a report about excavating the mound for the Smithsonian Institution. Walker surveyed several mounds in the Florida Panhandle and noted that many curiosity seekers had dug into the mound over the years. Walker noted that Dr. S.S. Forbes from Milton, Florida, had excavated the mound previously and discovered bones and several clay effigies which he later donated to the Smithsonian.

Clarence Bloomfield Moore also excavated the mound in 1901 and brought many before unseen ceramic vessels and burial items to light. In 1940 the highly respected archaeologist Gordon Willey and Richard Woodbury reexamined the Fort Walton Mound and other sites Moore had visited. Their work here was mentioned in Willey's highly acclaimed work "Archaeology of the Florida Gulf Coast," which he completed when he worked for the Bureau of American Ethnology Smithsonian Institution. By 1960 Dr. Charles Fairbanks, an archaeologist and professor at Florida State University, was contacted by the city and he excavated the mound to determine the original size, shape, and construction method of the mound. Throughout the 1960s and 1970s the Fort Walton Mound was excavated by members of the museum staff under the guidance of William and Yulee Lazarus. In 1971-1973 with the help of Depauw University's Robert J. Fornaro the mound was excavated to locate post holes and recover ceramic material that might fit vessels found earlier. The last excavation of the Fort Walton Mound occurred in 1976 by then FSU graduate student Nina Thanz (Borremans). Thanz was tasked with making sure the reconstruction of a temple building being planned for the top of the mound would not disturb any human remains or artifacts during construction. She found several post holes from different structures built on top of the mound and evidence for a charnel house. Her findings of post holes became one source of the dimensions to the building structure that stands on the mound today. According to the first curator of the Indian Temple Mound Museum Yulee Lazarus the reconstruction of the temple building that currently stands on top of the mound was never intended on being a "replica," but rather to "bolster the imagination and interpretation of the Indians' use of the temple mound."

== Fort Walton Culture ==
The mounds were built by the people of the Pensacola culture, a regional variation of the Mississippian culture. The Fort Walton culture was named for the site by archaeologist Gordon Willey, but later work in the area has led archaeologists to believe the Fort Walton site was actually built and used by people of the contemporaneous Pensacola culture. The peoples of the Fort Walton culture used mostly sand, grit, grog, or combinations of these materials as tempering agents in their pottery, whereas the Pensacola culture peoples used the more typical Mississippian culture shell tempering for their pottery. The site was abandoned by 1500 A.D. but the exact reason for the abandonment is unknown. It has been speculated that this was due to the arrival of European settlers, but this statement is unproven because the sites were already found abandoned by Spanish explorers years before.

The people are recognized as being one of the most successful pre-Columbian cultures in regards to agriculture. A number of crops were successful including corn, beans, and squash. The mound itself appears in a common architectural fashion for the period with features such as a pyramidal base with a truncated top. The flat top was used for ceremonies, temples, and residences for high-ranking officials.

== Fort Walton Beach Heritage Park & Cultural Center ==
Fort Walton Mound is now protected as part of the Fort Walton Beach Heritage Park & Cultural Center, which features several museums included with admission: the Indian Temple Mound Museum, Camp Walton Schoolhouse Museum, Garnier Post Office Museum and Civil War Exhibits Building.

=== Indian Temple Mound Museum ===
The city-owned and operated Indian Temple Mound Museum features pre-Columbian artifacts found on site and from other locations, as well as a variety of exhibits on later Native American and Floridian history including artifacts from the European Explorers, local pirates and early settlers. The address is 139 Miracle Strip Pkwy SE, near the intersection of State Road 85 and U.S. Route 98, in the Florida Panhandle. The museum was first opened in 1962 and the current location was opened in 1972.

=== Camp Walton Schoolhouse Museum ===
The Camp Walton Schoolhouse Museum was the original one-room schoolhouse built in 1911. It opened for use for the community children from 1912 to 1936. Opened in 1976, the museum features early-20th-century desks and education items.

=== Garnier Post Office Museum ===
The Garnier Post Office Museum is an original small rural post office that displays the postal history of Camp Walton and Fort Walton with emphasis from 1900 to the 1950s. The site also served as a voting location. The museum opened in 1988.

=== Civil War Exhibits Building ===
Opened in 2010, the Civil War Exhibits Building features displays about Florida's history during the American Civil War.

== Gallery ==
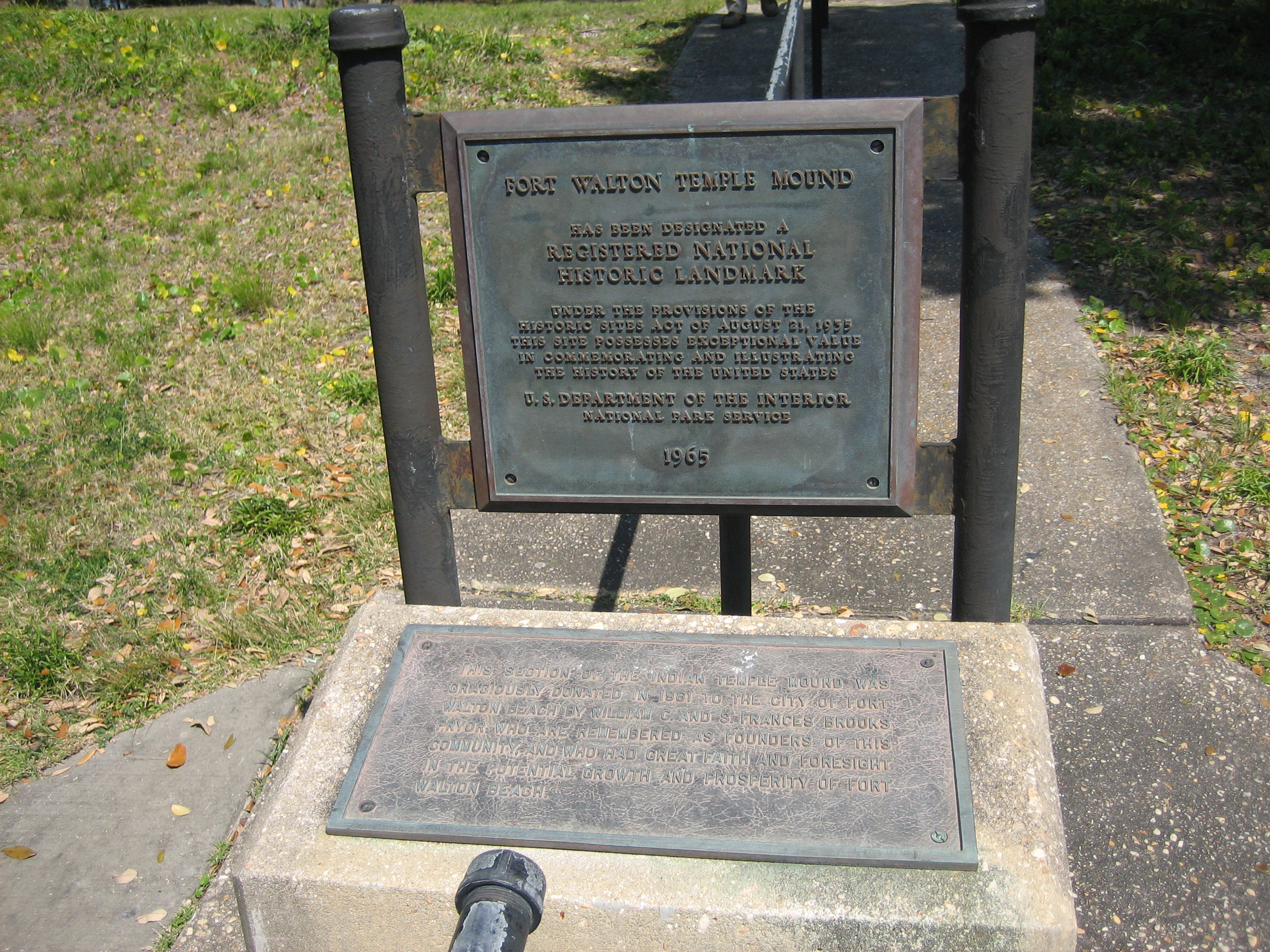
Explanatory plaque

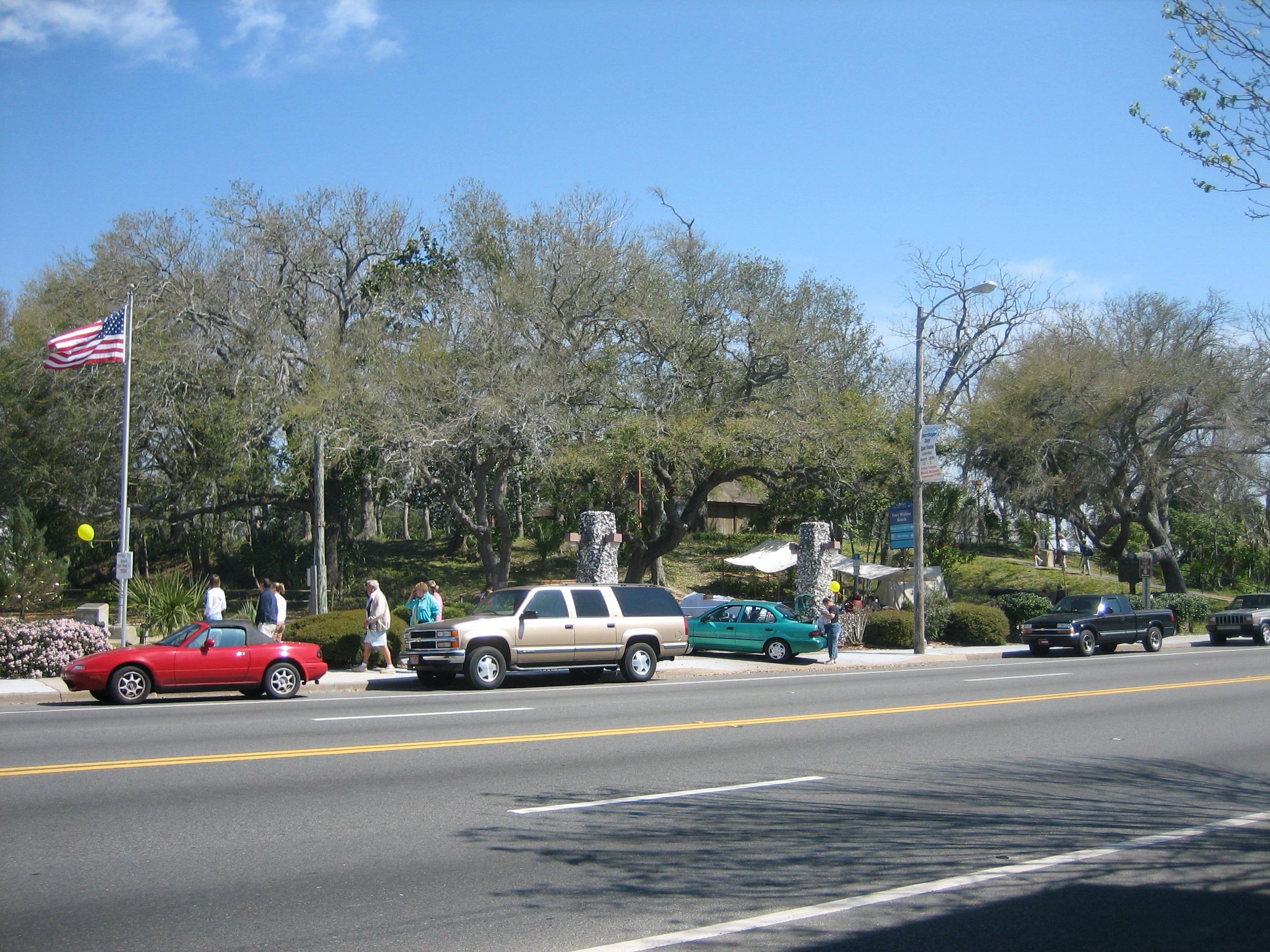
Indian Mound park

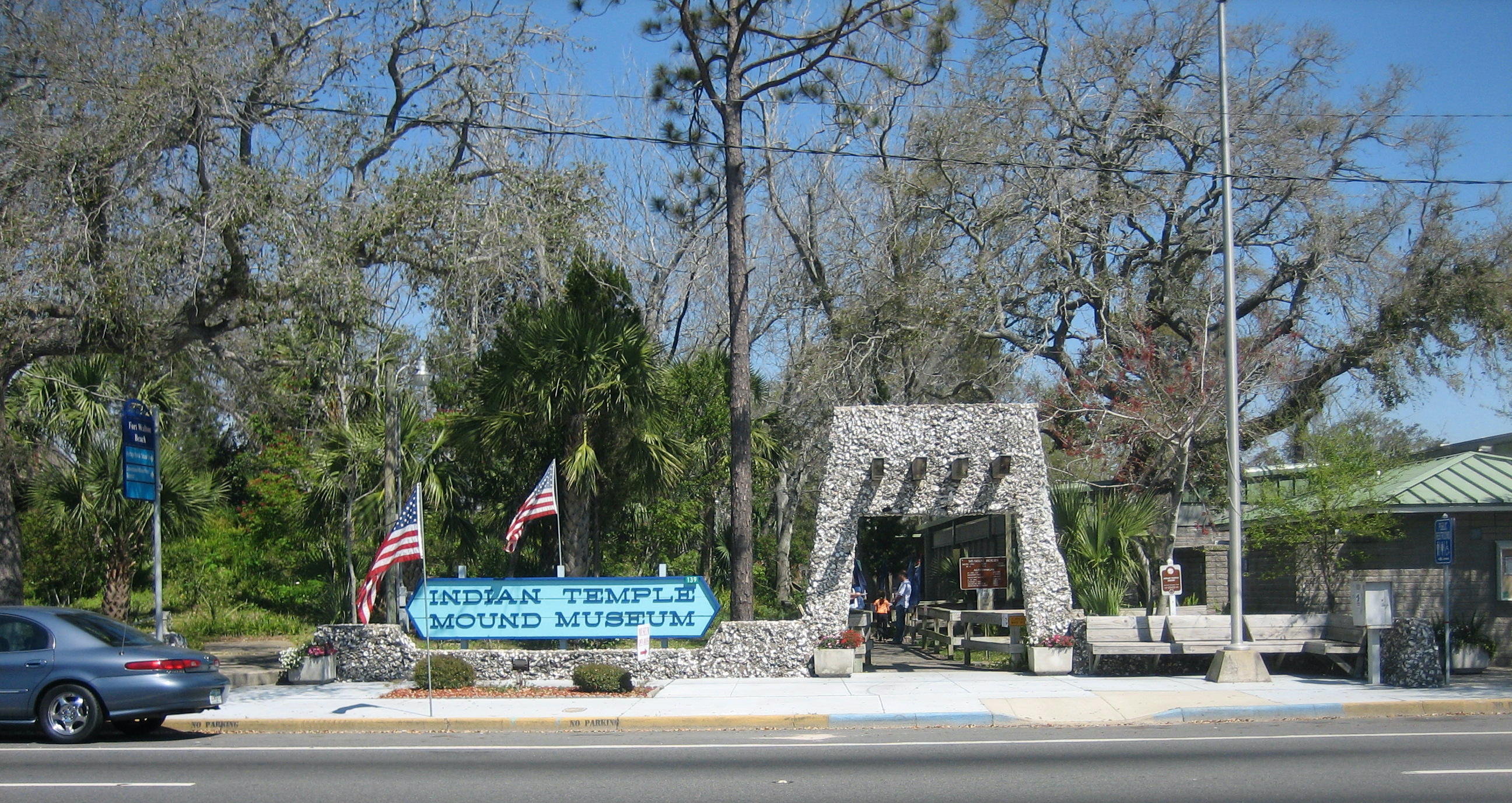
Indian Temple Mound park entrance

== See also ==
- Southeastern Ceremonial Complex
- List of Mississippian sites
