= Sny Magill Creek =

Tributary of the Mississippi River

Coordinates: 42.9360974°N 91.1667965°W

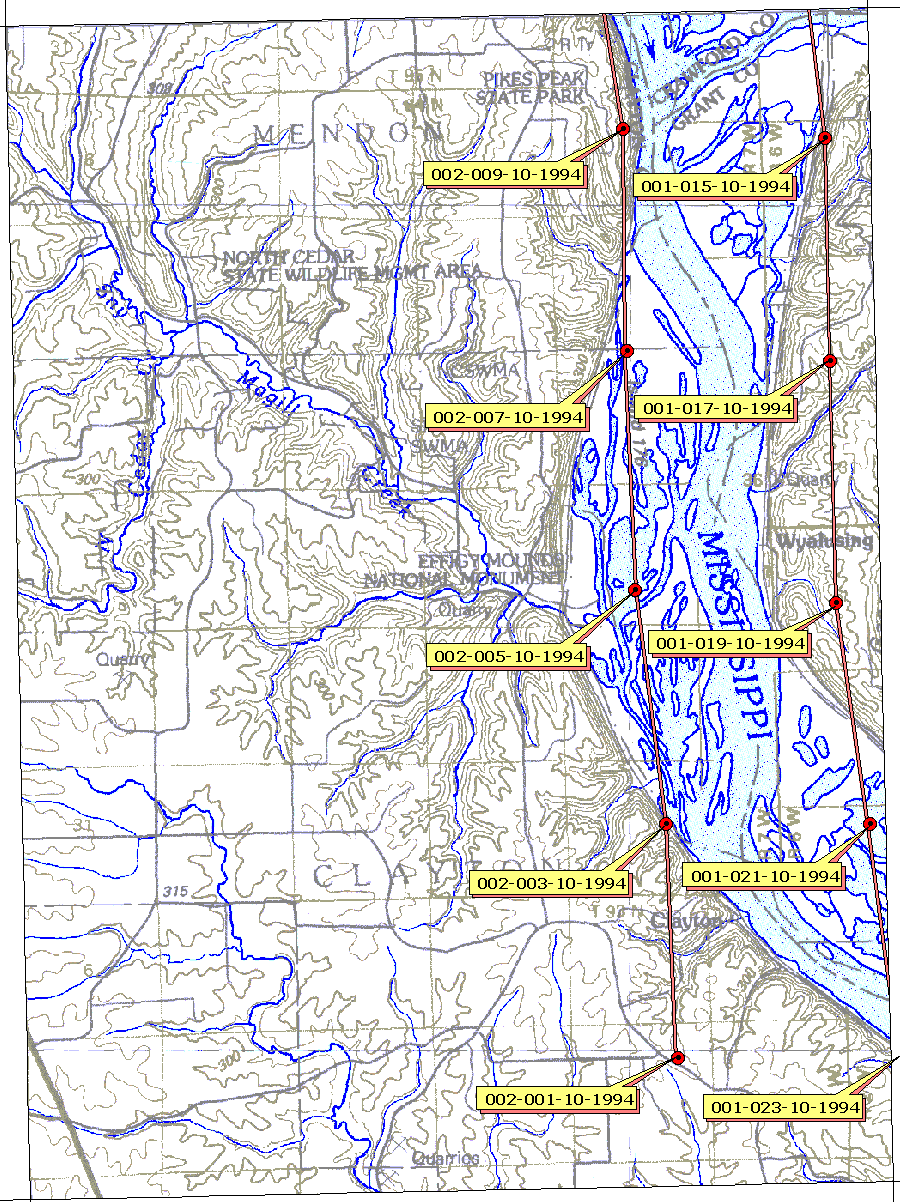
Sny Magill Creek (USGS)

Sny Magill Creek is a minor tributary of the Upper Mississippi River, rising in central Clayton County, Iowa and flowing to the Upper Mississippi River approximately 2 miles north of Clayton, Iowa. It has a drainage of 22,780 acres (92.2 km^{2}). It is regarded as one of the best trout streams in Iowa. The majority of this forested basin is incorporated into the Sny Magill-North Cedar Creek Wildlife Management Area.

== Name ==
The 1916 volume History of Clayton County, Iowa gives the following etymology for the creek:

About six miles southward from McGregor, flowing in a southeasterly direction, the "Sny Magill" discharges its waters into a slough of the Mississippi, after winding through the country a distance of seven miles. This stream takes its name from the slough into which it empties, which was originally called by the French voyageurs "Chinaille Magill," which in English would express Magill's channel or slough. Donald Magill, a Scotchman, and an Indian trader, built a trading house upon the bank of this slough near the mouth of the "Sny Magill" in the year 1814, where for several years he carried on a trade with the Sacs and Musquakee Indians. The Spaniards called this slough "The Sny Magill," and the inland stream that empties into it has taken and preserved the name. This stream is often improperly called the Sly Magill. Magill died at St. Louis about the year 1820.

== See also ==
- List of rivers of Iowa

== Sources ==
- Iowa Department of Natural Resources
- map
- Environmental Protection Agency
- Environmental Protection Agency
- National Park Service (*.pdf)
- infosports.com
- Iowa DNR, *.pdf format
