= Woodland period =

North American cultural period (1000 BCE – 1000 CE)

In the classification of archaeological cultures of North America, the Woodland period of North American pre-Columbian cultures spanned a period from roughly 1000 BCE to European contact in the eastern part of North America, with some archaeologists distinguishing the Mississippian period, from 1000 CE to European contact, as a separate period. The term "Woodland Period" was introduced in the 1930s as a generic term for prehistoric sites falling between the Archaic hunter-gatherers and the agriculturalist Mississippian cultures. The Eastern Woodlands cultural region covers what is now eastern Canada south of the Subarctic region, the Eastern United States, and along the Gulf of Mexico.

This period is variously considered a developmental stage, a time period, a suite of technological adaptations or "traits", and a "family tree" of cultures related to earlier Archaic cultures. It can be characterized as a chronological and cultural manifestation without any massive changes in a short time, but instead having a continuous development in stone and bone tools, leather crafting, textile manufacture, cultivation, and shelter construction. Many Woodland peoples used spears and atlatls until the end of the period, when they were replaced by bows and arrows; however, Southeastern Woodland peoples also used blowguns.

The most cited technological distinction of this period was the widespread use of pottery (although pottery manufacture had arisen during the Archaic period in some places), and the diversification of pottery forms, decorations, and manufacturing practices. The increasing use of horticulture and the development of the Eastern Agricultural Complex, consisting of weedy seed plants as well as gourd cultivation, also meant that groups became less mobile over time and, in some times and places, people lived in permanently occupied villages and cities. Intensive agriculture characterizes the Mississippian period from c. 1000–1400 CE and may have continued up to European contact, around 500 years ago.

== Early Woodland period (1000–200 BCE) ==
The Early Woodland period continued many trends begun during the Late and Terminal Archaic periods, including extensive mound-building, regional distinctive burial complexes, the trade of exotic goods across a large area of North America as part of interaction spheres, the reliance on both wild and domesticated plant foods, and a mobile subsistence strategy in which small groups took advantage of seasonally available resources such as nuts, fish, shellfish, and wild plants. Pottery, which had been manufactured during the Archaic period in limited amounts, was now widespread across the Eastern Interior, the Southeast, and the Northeast. The Far Northeast, the Sub-Arctic, and the Northwest/Plains regions widely adopted pottery somewhat later, about 200 BCE.

=== Interaction ===
The Adena culture built conical mounds in which single- or multiple-event burials, often cremated, were interred along with rich grave goods including copper bracelets, beads, and gorgets, art objects made from mica, novaculite, hematite, banded slate, and other kinds of stone, shell beads and cups, and leaf-shaped "cache blades". This culture is believed to have been core to the Meadowood Interaction Sphere, in which cultures in the Great Lakes region, the St. Lawrence region, the Far Northeast, and the Atlantic region interacted. The large area of interaction is indicated by the presence of Adena-style mounds, the presence of exotic goods from other parts of the interaction spheres, and the participation in the "Early Woodland Burial Complex" defined by William Ritchie

=== Pottery ===
Pottery was widely manufactured and sometimes traded, particularly in the Eastern Interior region. Clay for pottery was typically tempered (mixed with non-clay additives) with grit (crushed rock) or limestone. Pots were usually made in a conoidal or conical jar with rounded shoulders, slightly constricted necks, and flaring rims. Pottery was most often decorated with a variety of linear or paddle stamps that created "dentate" (tooth-like) impressions, wavy line impressions, checked surfaces, or fabric-impressed surfaces, but some pots were incised with herringbone and other geometric patterns or, more rarely, with pictorial imagery such as faces. Pots were coiled and paddled entirely by hand without the use of fast rotation, such as a pottery wheel. Some were slipped or brushed with red ochre.

Pottery, agriculture, and permanent settlements have often been thought of as the three defining characteristics of the Woodland period. However, it has become evident that, in some areas of North America, prehistoric cultural groups with a clearly Archaic cultural assemblage were making pottery without any evidence of the cultivation of domesticated crops. In fact, it appears that hunting and gathering continued as the basic subsistence economy and that subsistence horticulture/agriculture did not occur in much of the Southeast for a couple of thousand years after the introduction of pottery, and in parts of the Northeast, horticulture was never practiced. This research indicated that a fiber-tempered horizon of ceramics greatly predates 1000 BCE, first appearing about 2500 BCE in parts of Florida with the Orange culture and in Georgia with the Stallings culture. Nevertheless, these early sites were typical Archaic settlements, differing only in the use of basic ceramic technology. As such, researchers are now redefining the period to begin with not only pottery, but the appearance of permanent settlements, elaborate burial practices, intensive collection and/or horticulture of starchy seed plants (see Eastern Agricultural Complex), differentiation in social organization, and specialized activities, among other factors. Most of these are evident in the Southeastern Woodlands by 1000 BCE.

In some areas, like South Carolina and coastal Georgia, Deptford culture pottery manufacture ceased after c. 700 CE.

=== Subsistence strategies ===
In coastal regions, many settlements were near the coast, often near salt marshes, which were habitats rich in food resources. People tended to settle along rivers and lakes in both coastal and interior regions for maximum access to food resources. Nuts were processed in large amounts, including hickory and acorns, and many wild berries, including palm berries, blueberries, raspberries, and strawberries, were eaten, as well as wild grapes and persimmon. Most groups relied heavily on white-tailed deer, but a variety of other small and large mammals were also hunted, including beaver, raccoon, and bear. Shellfish formed an important part of the diet, attested to by numerous shell middens along the coast and interior rivers.

Coastal peoples practiced seasonal mobility, moving to the coast during the summer to take advantage of numerous marine resources such as sea mammals and shellfish, then moving to interior locations during the winter where access to deer, bear, and anadromous fish such as salmon could see them through the winter. Seasonal foraging also characterized the strategies of many interior populations, with groups moving strategically among dense resource areas.

Recently evidence has accumulated a greater reliance on woodland peoples on cultivation in this period, at least in some localities, than has historically been recognized. This is especially true for the middle woodland period and perhaps beyond. C. Margaret Scarry states "in the Woodland periods, people diversified their use of plant foods ... [they] increased their consumption of starchy foods. They did so, however, by cultivating starchy seeds rather than by gathering more acorns." Smith and Yarnell refer to an "indigenous crop complex" as early as 3800 B.P. in parts of the region.

== Middle Woodland period (200 BCE – 500 CE) ==
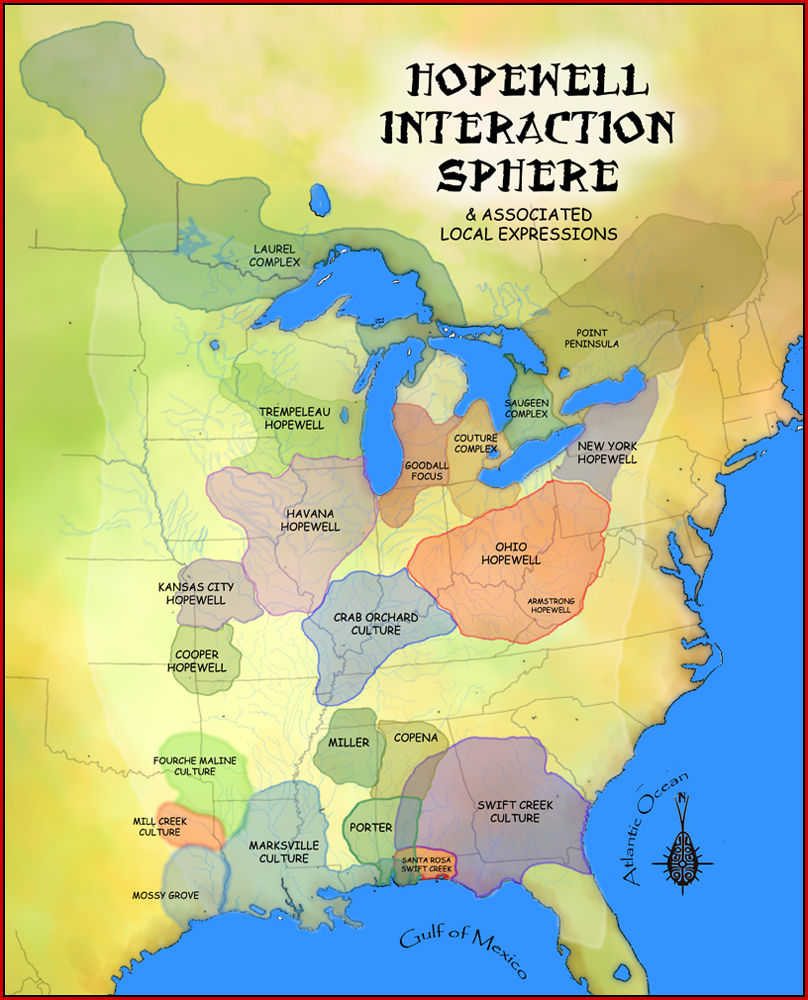
Hopewell Interaction Area and local expressions of the Hopewell tradition

The beginning of the Middle Woodland saw a shift of settlement to the Interior. As the Woodland period progressed, local and inter-regional trade of exotic materials greatly increased to the point where a trade network covered most of the Eastern Woodlands. Throughout the Southeast and north of the Ohio River, burial mounds of important people were very elaborate and contained a variety of mortuary gifts, many of which were not local. Among the traded materials were copper from the Lake Superior deposits; silver from Lake Superior and especially Ontario; galena from Missouri and Illinois; mica from the southern Appalachians; chert from various places including Ohio, Indiana, and Illinois; pipestone from Ohio and Illinois; alligator teeth from the lower Mississippi Valley eastward to Florida; marine shells, especially whelks, from the south Atlantic and Gulf coasts; Knife River chalcedony from North Dakota; and obsidian from Yellowstone in Wyoming.

The most archaeologically certifiable sites of burial during this time were in Illinois and Ohio. These have come to be known as the Hopewell tradition. Due to the similarity of earthworks and burial goods, researchers assume a common body of religious practice and cultural interaction existed throughout the entire region (referred to as the "Hopewellian Interaction Sphere"). Such similarities could also be the result of reciprocal trade, obligations, or both between local clans that controlled specific territories. Access to food or resources outside a clan's territory would be made possible through formal agreements with neighbors. Clan heads would be buried along with goods received from their trading partners to symbolize the relationships they had established. Under this scenario, permanent settlements would be likely to develop, leading to increased agricultural production and a population increase.

Ceramics during this time were thinner and better quality than earlier times. Examples show pottery also was more decorated than Early Woodland. One style was the Trempealeau phase, which could have been seen by the Hopewell in Indiana. This type included a round body, and lines of decoration with cross-etching on rim. The Havana style found in Illinois had a decorated neck. One of the major tools unique to this era was Snyders Points. These were quite large and corner-notched. They were made by soft-hammering percussion, and finished by pressure flaking.

Although many of the Middle Woodland cultures are called "Hopewellian", and groups shared ceremonial practices, archeologists have identified the development of distinctly separate cultures during the Middle Woodland period. Examples include the Armstrong culture, Copena culture, Crab Orchard culture, Fourche Maline culture, the Goodall Focus, the Havana Hopewell culture, the Kansas City Hopewell, the Marksville culture, and the Swift Creek culture.

The Center for American Archeology specializes in Middle Woodland culture.

== Late Woodland period (500–1000 CE) ==
The late Woodland period was a time of apparent population dispersal, although populations do not appear to have decreased. In most areas, the construction of burial mounds decreased markedly, as did the long-distance trade in exotic materials. At the same time, bow and arrow technology gradually overtook the use of the spear and atlatl. While full-scale intensive agriculture did not begin until the following Mississippian period, the beginning of serious cultivation greatly supplemented the traditional gathering of plants.

Late Woodland settlements became more numerous, but the size of each one (with exceptions) was smaller than their Middle Woodland counterparts. The reasons for this are unknown, but it has been theorized that populations increased so much that trade alone could no longer support the communities. Some clans resorted to raiding others for resources. Alternatively, the efficiency of bows and arrows in hunting may have decimated the large game animals, forcing the tribes to break apart into smaller clans to use local resources better, thus limiting the trade potential of each group. A third possibility is that a colder climate may have affected food yields, possibly affected by the volcanic winter of 536 in the Northern Hemisphere, and also limited trade possibilities. Lastly, it may be that agricultural technology became sophisticated enough that crop variation between clans lessened, thereby decreasing the need for trade.

As communities became more isolated, they began to develop in their own unique ways, giving rise to small-scale cultures that were distinctive to their regional areas. Examples include the Baytown, Troyville and Coles Creek cultures of Louisiana; the Alachua and Weeden Island cultures of Florida; and the Plum Bayou culture of Arkansas and Missouri.

Although the 1000 CE ending of the Late Woodland period is traditional, in practice, many regions of the Eastern Woodlands adopted the Mississippian culture much later than that. Some groups in the north and northeast of the current United States, such as the Iroquois, retained a way of life that was technologically identical to the Late Woodland until the arrival of Europeans. Despite the widespread adoption of the bow and arrow during this time, the peoples of a few areas appear never to have made the change. During Hernando de Soto's travels through the Southeastern Woodlands around 1543, for instance, his expedition noted the groups living at the mouth of the Mississippi still preferentially used the spear.

== See also ==
- Rock Eagle
- Rock Hawk
- Old Stone Fort (Tennessee)
- Pinson Mounds
- Cane Island Site
- Crystal River Archaeological State Park
- Mound Builders
- Glenwood culture
- Cherokee
