= East Georgia (region) =

Coordinates: 33.548°N 81.644°W

- Region
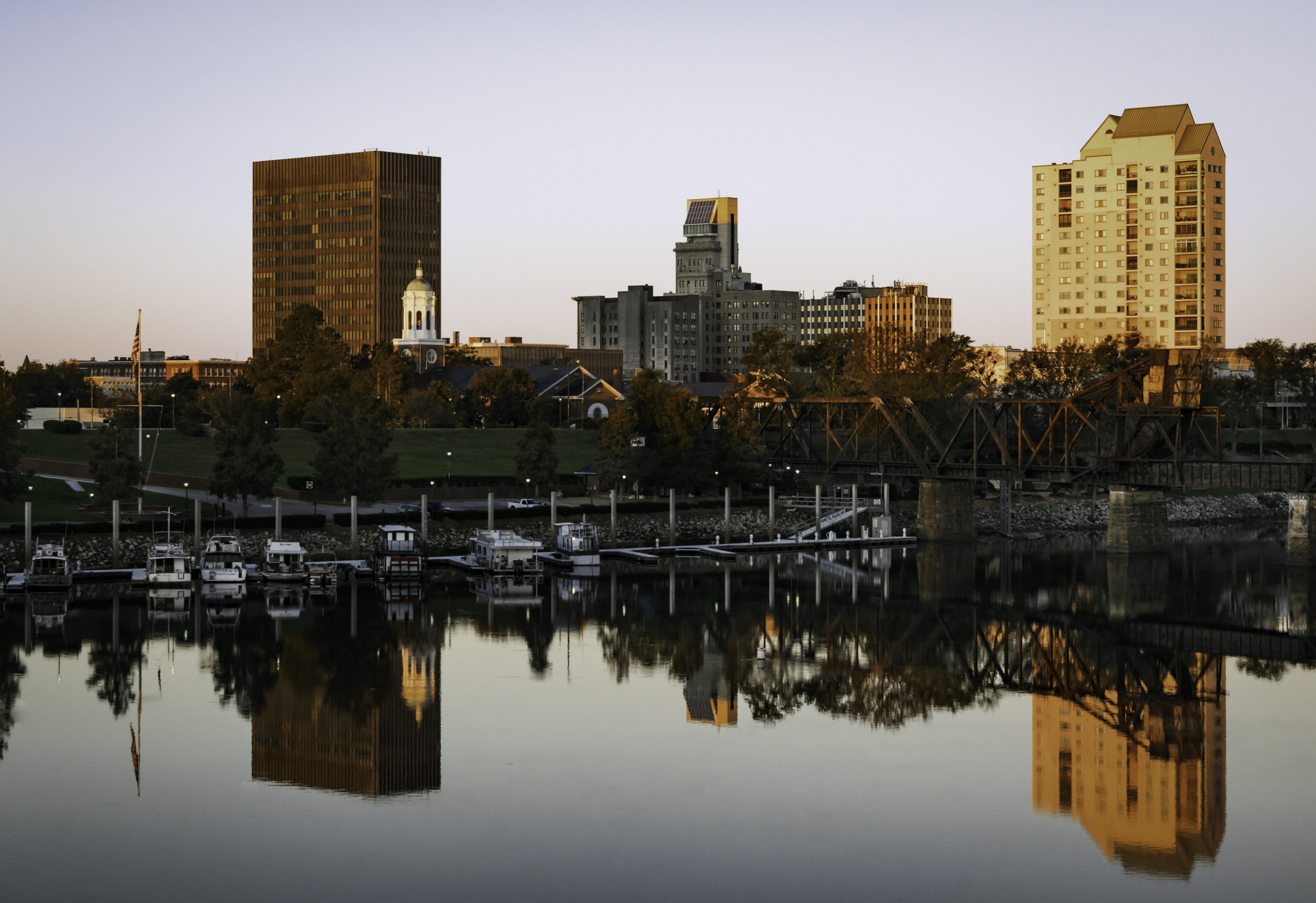
- Downtown Augusta

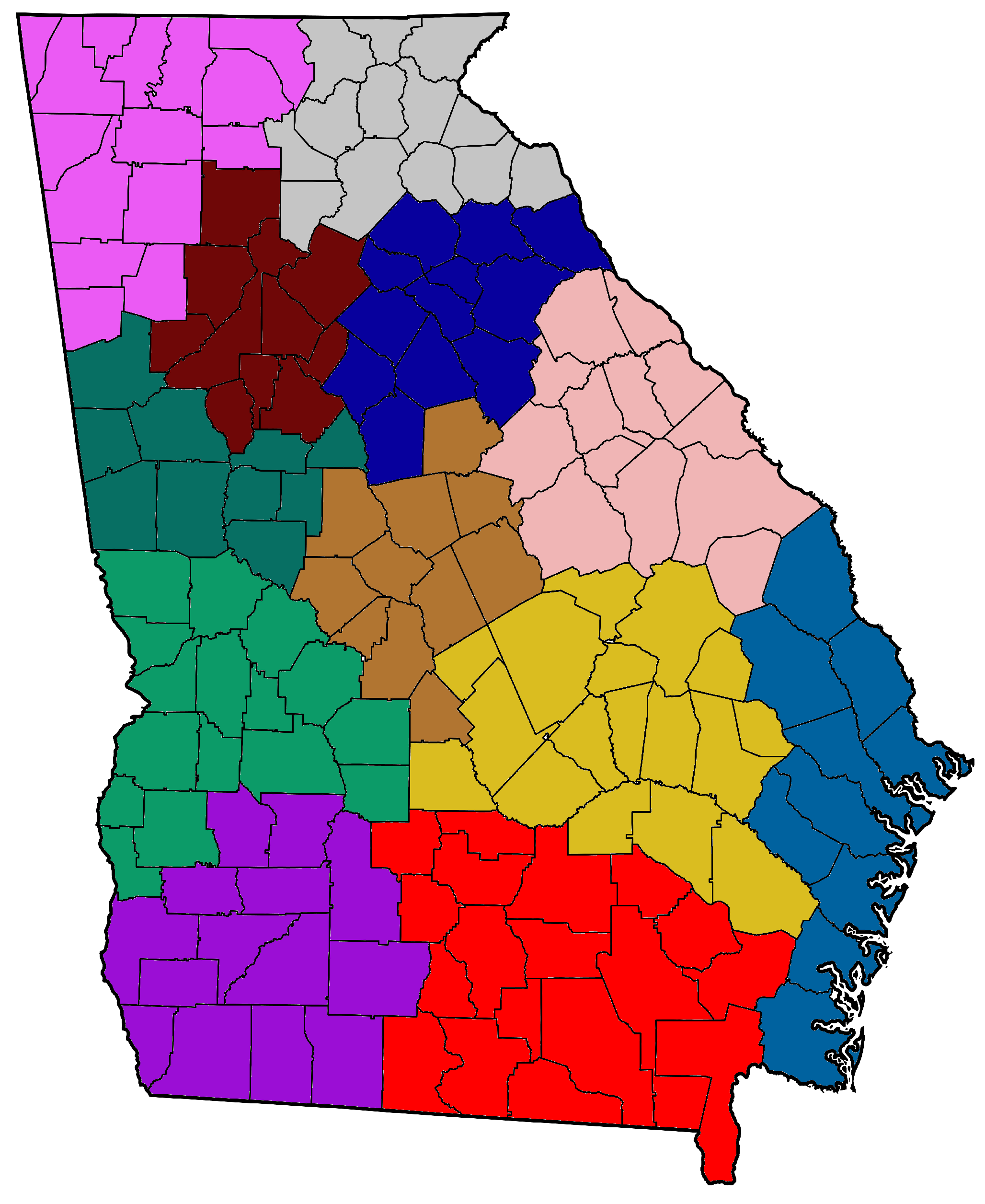
- East Georgia highlighted in light pink

- Location of Georgia within the United States
- Country: United States
- State: Georgia
- Largest city: Augusta

Population (2020)
  - Total: 479,864
- Demonym: East Georgian
- Website: georgia.org/regions/east-georgia

East Georgia is a thirteen-county region in the U.S. state of Georgia, bordering South Carolina. North of Coastal and South Georgia as well as the Lower Coastal Plain, part of the region lies in the Fall Line section of the state. The largest county by population in East Georgia is Richmond County, and its most populous city is Augusta, anchoring the Augusta metropolitan statistical area. Tabulating the region's counties, its population as of the 2020 U.S. census was 479,864.

== Geography ==
Lying within the Fall Line area of Georgia, the region borders South Carolina. According to the Georgia Department of Economic Development, East Georgia is made up of the following counties: Burke, Columbia, Glascock, Hancock, Jefferson, Jenkins, Lincoln, McDuffie, Richmond, Taliaferro, Warren, Washington, and Wilkes.

== Demographics ==
As of the 2020 U.S. census, the counties comprising East Georgia had a total resident population of 479,864. Among these counties, non-Hispanic whites and African Americans were the predominant racial and ethnic groups present in East Georgia, in common with the remainder of the state.

Religiously, East Georgia is within the Bible Belt, and Christianity has been the predominant religion since the colonial era. According to a study by the Association of Religion Data Archives in 2020, Protestantism was the largest collective Christian group, and Baptists were the largest Protestant tradition in the region. Non- or inter-denominational Protestants formed the second-largest Protestant tradition, followed by Methodists. Catholicism was the region's largest non-Protestant Christian group.

The largest Christian denominations irrespective of traditional grouping were the Southern Baptist Convention, United Methodist Church, Catholic Church, National Baptist Convention of the United States of America, National Missionary Baptist Convention of America, African Methodist Episcopal Church, and the Church of God (Cleveland, Tennessee). East Georgia also had a substantial population of Jehovah's Witnesses and Mormons in the Church of Jesus Christ of Latter-day Saints according to the same study.

In 2020, the largest non-Christian religions were Hinduism, Islam, Buddhism, Judaism, the Baha'i Faith, Sikhism, and Jainism according to the Association of Religion Data Archives. Of its Buddhist communities, Theravada Buddhism was the largest branch practiced, and the region's Jewish communities were divided between Conservative Judaism, Reform Judaism, Orthodox Judaism, and Chabad Judaism.

== Economy ==
With an economy centered within the Augusta metropolis, its largest industries are medicine, biotechnology, cyber security, manufacturing, and education. Prominent employers and organizations throughout the region have been Augusta University, Augusta Technical College, Paine College, East Georgia State College and Georgia Military College, the Richmond County School System, Savannah River Site, Encompass Health Corporation, T-Mobile, Teleperformance, and Coca-Cola. Among the colleges and universities, Augusta University has made an economic impact of $2.24 billion and more than 21,000 jobs to the state's economy as of 2022.

== Transportation ==
Air travel services are provided by the Augusta Regional Airport. Daniel Field is another airport servicing the East Georgia region. East Georgia is also served by two interstates and a multitude of U.S. Routes, listed below:

=== Interstates and other highways ===
- I-20 (Carl Sanders Highway)
- I-520 (Bobby Jones Expressway / Deputy James D. Paugh Memorial Highway)
- US 1 (Deans Bridge Road (from Jefferson County line to Gordon Highway); Gordon Highway (from Deans Bridge Road to South Carolina state line); Fall Line Freeway (from Jefferson County line to I-520))
- US 25 (Peach Orchard Road (entire length); Gordon Highway (from Peach Orchard Road to South Carolina state line))
- US 25 Bus. (Broad Street / 13th Street)
- US 78 / US 278 (Gordon Highway)
- SR 4 (follows US 1 from Jefferson County line to Gordon Highway; leaves Georgia at James U. Jackson Memorial Bridge)
- SR 28 (various roads, including John C. Calhoun Expressway and Washington Road)
- SR 56 (Mike Padgett Highway)
- SR 88 in southern Richmond County
- SR 104 (Washington Road; Pleasant Home Road; River Watch Parkway)
- SR 104 Conn. (Washington Road)
- SR 232 (Columbia Road / Bobby Jones Expressway)
- SR 383 (Jimmie Dyess Parkway)
- SR 540 (Fall Line Freeway (Deans Bridge Road from Jefferson County line to I-520))
- SR 555 / SR 565 (Savannah River Parkway (Peach Orchard Road from Burke County line to I-520))
