= Georgia State Route 223 =

State highway in Georgia, United States

State Route 223
- SR 223 highlighted in red

Route information
- Maintained by GDOT
- Length: 20.9 mi (33.6 km)
- Existed: 1944–present

Major junctions
- West end: SR 17 in Thomson
- US 78 / SR 10 / SR 17 Byp. east of Thomson; US 221 / SR 47 north of Harlem; SR 388 in Grovetown
- East end: US 78 / US 278 / SR 10 in Augusta

Location
- Country: United States
- State: Georgia
- Counties: McDuffie, Columbia, Richmond

Highway system
- Georgia State Highway System; Interstate; US; State; Special
← SR 222	→ SR 224

State Route 223 (SR 223) is a 20.9-mile-long (33.6 km) east–west state highway in the east-central part of the U.S. state of Georgia. Its routing travels through portions of McDuffie, Columbia, and Richmond counties. The highway connects Thomson with Grovetown, Augusta, and Fort Gordon. Except for the portions in Thomson, Grovetown, and Augusta, the highway is relatively rural.

== Route description ==
SR 223 begins at an intersection with SR 17 (Main Street) in Thomson, in central McDuffie County. Here, SR 223 is known as White Oak Street. At the intersection with Holt Street, it curves to the east-southeast and becomes known as White Oak Road. After that, it curves to the east-northeast. On the eastern edge of the city, the highway travels between Thomson High School and Thomson–McDuffie Middle School. Just after leaving the city limits, it has an intersection with US 78/SR 10/SR 17 Byp. (Thomson Bypass). The highway curves to the northeast and enters Columbia County.

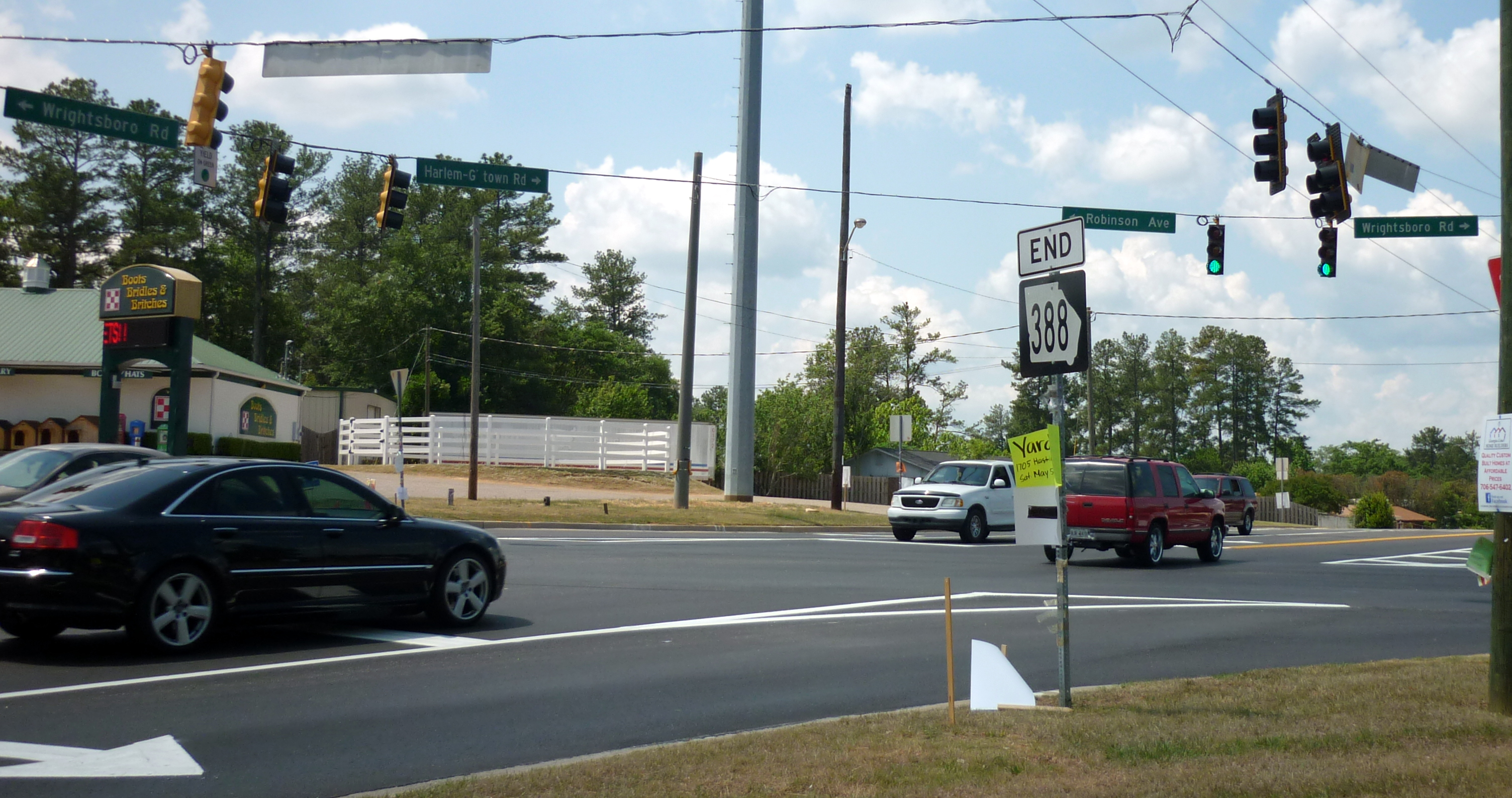
SR 223 intersects the southern terminus of SR 388 in Grovetown, where both highways meet the eastern terminus of Harlem-Grovetown Road.

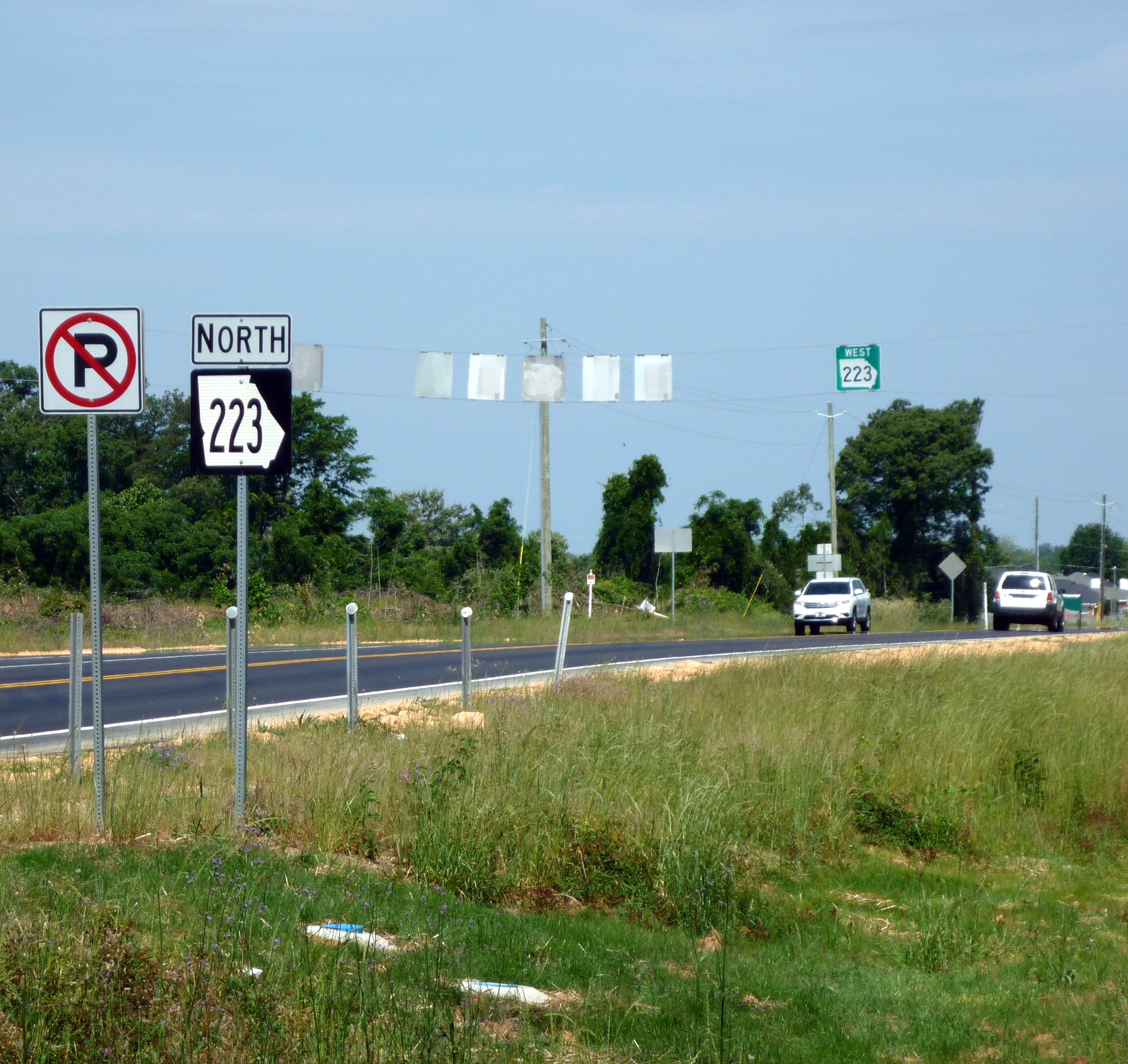
SR 223, just northwest of its eastern terminus in Augusta, looking northwest toward Grovetown (note the discrepancy in signage, "north" vs. "west")

Almost immediately, SR 223 curves back to the east-southeast at a point just southeast of White Oak Campground. At the intersection with Hinton Wilson Road, SR 223 becomes known as Wrightsboro Road. Farther to the east, Wrightsboro Road is an important urban corridor in the Augusta metropolitan area. The highway crosses over Kiokee Creek and has a slight northward jog before continuing to the southeast. Approximately 0.5 miles (0.80 km) later, it intersects US 221/SR 47 (Appling–Harlem Road) at a roundabout. The road then curves to a more east-southeasterly routing and crosses over Little Kiokee Creek. Then, it travels just south of Euchee Creek Elementary School and Euchee Creek Library. A short distance later, the roadway crosses over the northern terminus of the Grovetown Trails at Euchee Creek, briefly skirting along the northwestern city limits of Grovetown in the process. A few hundred feet later, the highway enters Grovetown proper and has an intersection with the eastern terminus of Harlem–Grovetown Road. This intersection also marks the southern terminus of SR 388, which takes on the "Wrightsboro Road" name, while SR 223 continues as West Robinson Avenue. The highway travels to the southeast. Just before intersecting the northern terminus of Newmantown Road, it curves to the east-southeast. Upon crossing some railroad tracks of CSX, it becomes East Robinson Avenue. Between the southern terminus of 2nd Avenue and the northern terminus of Hollingsworth Drive, it passes the city's fire and police department. It then curves to the south-southeast. At an intersection with the western terminus of Selkirk Way, SR 223 curves back to the southeast. Just past an intersection with the southern terminus of Pepper Hill Drive, the highway leaves the city limits of Grovetown and enters Richmond County and the city limits of Augusta.

Immediately, SR 223 meets its eastern terminus, an intersection with US 78/US 278/SR 10 (Gordon Highway). The roadway formally continues to Fort Gordon's Gate 2. But since after the Gordon Highway widening project has been completed in mid 2022, the gate is closed and blocked ever since. All traffic must turn a left or a right at its terminus.

The only segment of SR 223 that is included as part of the National Highway System, a system of routes determined to be the most important for the nation's economy, mobility and defense, is from just west of the SR 388 intersection in Grovetown to its eastern terminus in Augusta.

== History ==
SR 223 was established in 1943, but on a path from SR 12 (which currently also carries US 278) in Norwood northeast to SR 80 in Cadley. Between November 1946 and February 1948, a separate segment of SR 223 was built from SR 80 in Cedar Rock to SR 12 in Thomson; however, there was no indication if it was concurrent with SR 80 between Cadley and Cedar Rock. This segment of SR 223 began just west of the Warren–McDuffie county line. It was known as Norwood Road at the western terminus of this segment. It traveled to the north-northeast and very quickly changed to Cedar Rock Road. The highway curved to the east-southeast and crossed over Childers Creek. At its intersection with Sallywhite Road, it began to curve to the east-northeast. The highway then curved to the southeast. It crossed over, but did not have an interchange with, Interstate 20 (I-20; Carl Sanders Highway). Approximately 2,500 feet (760 m) later, SR 223 curved back to the east-northeast, but quickly curved to the east-southeast. Just after crossing over Mattox Creek, it curved to the south-southeast, and entered Thomson. At the city limits, the highway was known as Hickory Hill Drive and passed by Hickory Hill, a historic house museum, which is a National Historic Landmark, it was a home of Georgia Populist Party co-founder Thomas E. Watson. At the intersection with Lee and Lumpkin Streets, SR 223 was known as Tom Watson Way (named for Watson). It intersected SR 17 (Main Street) and the western terminus of SR 150 (Gordon Street). SR 17/SR 223 traveled concurrently to the south-southeast for about four blocks, where SR 223 split off to the northeast on White Oak Street, as it currently travels.

Between June 1954 and June 1955, a road that would eventually become a further eastern segment was built from US 78/US 278/SR 10/SR 12 in Thomson to another intersection with those highways west-southwest of Augusta. At this time, all three highways were paved. Between June 1960 and June 1963, the segment from Thomson and what is now western Augusta was designated as part of SR 223; however, there was no indication if it was concurrent with US 78/US 278/SR 10/SR 12 in Thomson. Between 1972 and 1974, the eastern terminus of the central segment in Thomson was shifted northward to directly connect with the western terminus of SR 150. At least between 1973 and 1980, SR 223 was indicated to be concurrent with SR 80 between Cadley and Cedar Rock. In 1981, the Norwood–Cedar Rock portion of the highway was decommissioned. Between 2011 and 2013, the segment of the highway from Cedar Rock to Thomson was decommissioned.

== Major intersections ==
County	Location	mi	km	Destinations	Notes
McDuffie	Thomson	0.0	0.0	SR 17 (Main Street) – Wrens, Warrenton, Washington	Western terminus; former eastern end of SR 17 concurrency
McDuffie		2.0	3.2	US 78 / SR 10 / SR 17 Byp. (Thomson Bypass) – Lincolnton, Washington	
Columbia		12.0	19.3	US 221 / SR 47 (Appling–Harlem Road) – Harlem, Appling	Roundabout
Columbia	Grovetown	18.7	30.1	SR 388 north (Wrightsboro Road east) / Harlem–Grovetown Road west to I-20	Southern terminus of SR 388; eastern terminus of Harlem–Grovetown Road; SR 388 takes on Wrightsboro Road name
Richmond	Augusta	20.9	33.6	US 78 / US 278 / SR 10 (Gordon Highway) – Harlem, Augusta, Fort Gordon, Augusta State Medical Prison	Eastern terminus; prior to mid 2022, the roadway continues to Fort Gordon's Gate 2 is now blocked and closed; all traffic must turn left or right
1.000 mi = 1.609 km; 1.000 km = 0.621 mi
