= Georgia State Route 388 =

State highway in Georgia, United States

State Route 388
- SR 388 highlighted in red

Route information
- Maintained by GDOT
- Length: 4.5 mi (7.2 km)
- Existed: 1991–present

Major junctions
- South end: SR 223 in Grovetown
- I-20 near Lewiston
- North end: SR 232 in Lewiston

Location
- Country: United States
- State: Georgia
- County: Columbia

Highway system
- Georgia State Highway System; Interstate; US; State; Special
← SR 387	→ SR 400

State Route 388 (SR 388) is a 4.5-mile-long (7.2 km) state highway that travels south-to-north in a backward L-shape, completely within Columbia County, in the east-central part of the state of Georgia. It connects Grovetown to Lewiston.

== Route description ==
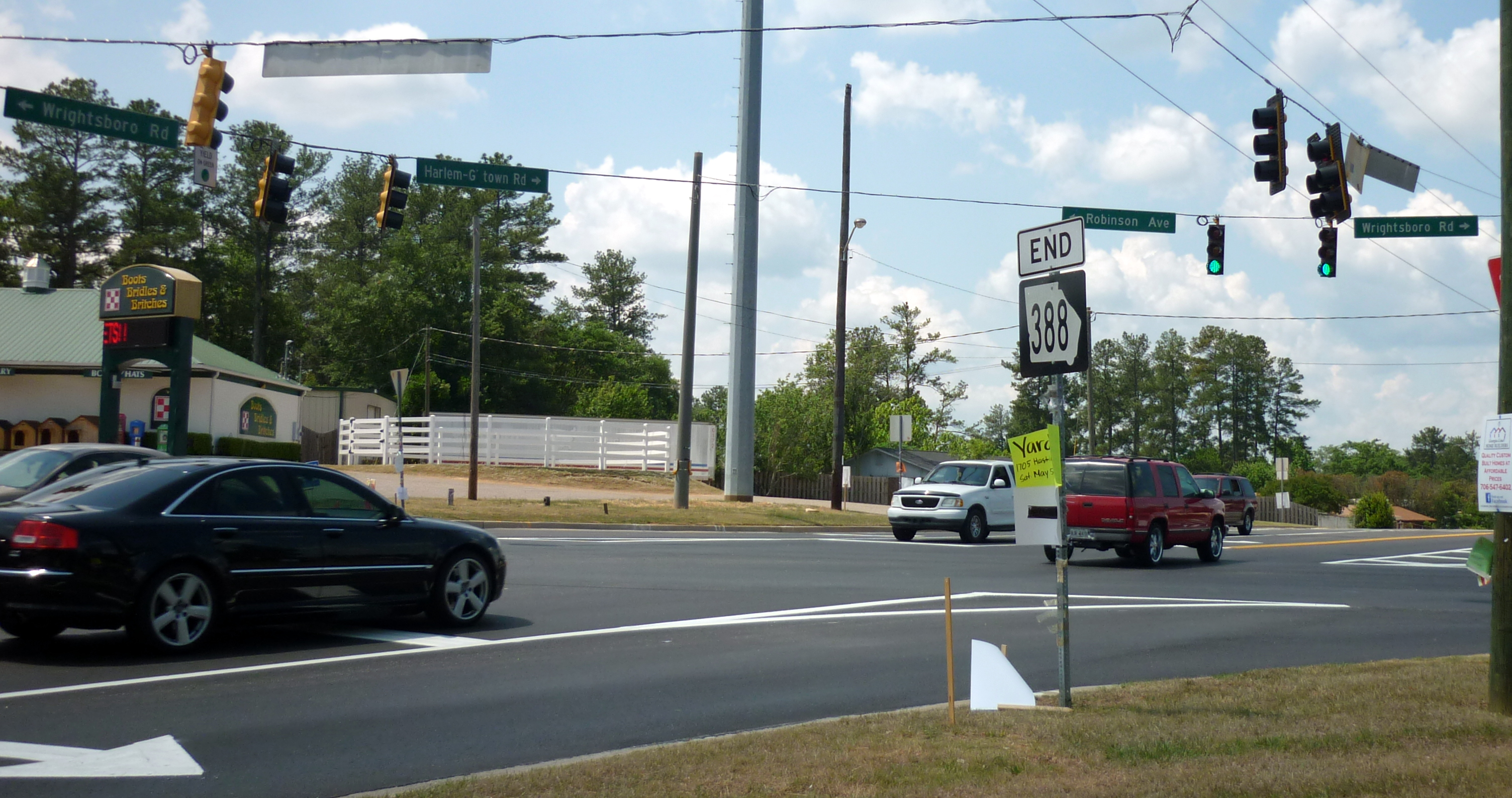
SR 388's southern terminus in Grovetown, at its intersection with SR 223 and the eastern terminus of Harlem–Grovetown Road

SR 388 begins at an intersection with SR 223 and the eastern terminus of Harlem–Grovetown Road in Grovetown. Here, SR 388 is known as Wrightsboro Road, a major urban corridor farther to the east in Augusta. SR 223 north of here is also known as Wrightsboro Road, but is known as West Robinson Avenue southeast of here. SR 388 travels to the northeast and passes Goodale Park. At an intersection with Whiskey Road, it begins a curve to the east. This 0.8-mile-long (1.3 km) section of roadway is lined with numerous businesses on both sides. It then intersects the northern terminus of Katherine Street and the southern terminus of Horizon South Parkway. Here, SR 388 turns left onto Horizon South Parkway, while Wrightsboro Road continues to the east toward Augusta. SR 388 takes Horizon South Parkway to the north-northeast.

It leaves the city limits of Grovetown just before passing a campus of Augusta Technical College and crossing over Mill Branch. It passes the Horizon South industrial complex, which includes a John Deere location, a Serta plant, and Palmetto Industries. Access is provided via Horizon West Parkway. Just after this intersection, the highway curves to the northwest. A short distance later, it curves to the north-northwest and has a brand new diverging diamond interchange with Interstate 20 (I-20; Carl Sanders Highway) and its internal designation of SR 402, which was converted from a formerly diamond interchange and was opened at February 26, 2024. Here, the roadway crosses over the Interstate highway on the Lieutenant General James E. Gray Memorial Bridge and becomes known as Lewiston Road. It curves to the north-northeast just south of an intersection with the southern terminus of William Few Parkway and the western terminus of Sugarcreek Drive. At an intersection with the eastern terminus of Mill Creek Lane, it curves back to the north-northwest. A short distance later, SR 388 meets its northern terminus, an intersection with SR 232 (Columbia Road). Here, the roadway continues as Hereford Farm Road, which leads to Evans. SR 388 connects SR 223 and SR 232, which travel parallel to each other on opposite sides of I-20 in southern Columbia County. This highway and Hereford Farm Road also serve to connect Grovetown and Evans.

== History ==
The road that would eventually become SR 388 was built in 1965 along the same alignment as it travels today. By 1991, the road was designated as SR 388. In 2004, it was extended along Hereford Farm Road. In 2007, it was removed from Hereford Farm Road.

== Future ==
All of SR 388, from Wrightsboro Road in Grovetown to SR 232 in Lewiston, will be widened into a four-lane road that includes a median, bike lanes, turning lanes, and sidewalks. SR 388 will also have a diverging diamond interchange with I-20 in the future, which was completed and opened at February 26, 2024.

Hereford Farm Road has been proposed to have a widening project, as well. It will be widened from a two-lane undivided highway to a four-lane divided highway. The whole project will be about 5.5 miles (8.9 km) from SR 232 (Columbia Road) to SR 383 (North Belair Road). Once the Hereford Farm Road widening project is completed, SR 388 will probably be extended to Evans and have its future northern terminus at SR 383 (North Belair Road) or at SR 104 (Washington Road).

== Major intersections ==
The entire route is in Columbia County.

Location	mi	km	Destinations	Notes
Grovetown	0.0	0.0	SR 223 east (West Robinson Avenue east) – Grovetown, Fort Gordon SR 223 west (Wrightsboro Road west) / Harlem–Grovetown Road west	Southern terminus of SR 388; eastern terminus of Harlem–Grovetown Road; western terminus of Robinson Avenue; SR 223 takes on the Wrightsboro Road name.
	2.8	4.5	I-20 east (Carl Sanders Highway east / SR 402 east) – Augusta	Diverging diamond interchange; was converted from a formerly diamond interchange and was opened at February 26th, 2024; I-20 east exit 190; SR 388 is known as Horizon South Parkway south of this interchange.
	2.8– 2.9	4.5– 4.7	Lieutenant General Robert E. Gray Memorial Bridge	Diverging diamond interchange; Crossing over I-20
	2.9	4.7	I-20 west (Carl Sanders Highway west / SR 402 west) – Atlanta	Diverging diamond interchange; I-20 west exit 190; SR 388 is known as Lewiston Road north of this interchange.
Lewiston	4.5	7.2	SR 232 (Columbia Road) / Lewiston Road ends / Hereford Farm Road north – Appling, Martinez, Evans, Patriots Park, Fair Grounds	Northern terminus of SR 388 and Lewiston Road; southern terminus of Hereford Farm Road
1.000 mi = 1.609 km; 1.000 km = 0.621 mi: Unopened

== Related routes ==
=== Harlem–Grovetown Road ===
Harlem–Grovetown Road
- Location: Harlem–Grovetown
- Length: 7.0 mi (11.3 km)

Harlem–Grovetown Road is the name for what is essentially a southern extension of SR 388, from the latter highway's southern terminus in Grovetown. As its name suggests, it serves to connect traffic from Harlem to Grovetown. Harlem–Grovetown Road is a 7.0-mile-long (11.3 km) route. Even though Georgia does not sign its county highways, except for on green street signs, Harlem–Grovetown Road is Columbia County Route 575 (CR 575).

The highway begins at an intersection with US 221/SR 47 (North Louisville Street) in Harlem and travels to the east-northeast. A short distance later, it leaves the city limits of Harlem and then crosses over Euchee Creek. After an intersection with Old Louisville Road, the road curves to the north-northeast. In Grovetown, it passes the Grovetown Trails at Euchee Creek, Grovetown Middle School, and Cedar Ridge Elementary School, just before meeting its eastern terminus, an intersection with SR 223 (known as Wrightsboro Road northwest of the intersection and West Robinson Avenue southeast of it) and the southern terminus of SR 388 (Wrightsboro Road).

The entire route is in Columbia County.

Location	mi	km	Destinations	Notes
Harlem	0.0	0.0	North Louisville Street (US 221 / SR 47)	Western terminus
Grovetown	7.0	11.3	SR 223 west (Wrightsboro Road west) SR 388 north (Wrightsboro Road east) to I-20 SR 223 east (West Robinson Avenue east) – Grovetown, Fort Gordon	Eastern terminus of Harlem–Grovetown Road; southern terminus of SR 388
1.000 mi = 1.609 km; 1.000 km = 0.621 mi

=== Hereford Farm Road ===
Hereford Farm Road
- Location: Lewiston–Evans
- Length: 5.6 mi (9.0 km)
- Existed: 1965–present

Hereford Farm Road is the name for what is essentially a northern and eastern extension of SR 388 (Lewiston Road), from the latter highway's northern terminus in Lewiston. It serves to connect traffic from SR 388 to Evans. Hereford Farm Road is a 5.6-mile-long (9.0 km) route. Even though Georgia does not sign its county highways, except for on green street signs, Hereford Farm Road is Columbia County Route 102 (CR 102).

The highway begins at an intersection with SR 232 (Columbia Road) and the northern terminus of SR 388 (Lewiston Road) in Lewiston and travels to the north-northwest. Almost immediately, it passes Lewiston Elementary School. Just south of Innisbrook Drive, it curves back to the north-northeast. The road then curves to the southeast and to the east-northeast. Just after crossing over Tudor Branch, the highway begins skirting the northwestern edge of the city limits of Evans. Between an intersection with the southern terminus of Blanchard Road and one with the northern terminus of Cedric Way, it passes by Evans Middle School. While passing the school, it curves to the east-southeast. Just west of an intersection with the northern terminus of Cox Road and the southern terminus of Gibbs Road, the highway curves back to the east-northeast. At this intersection, it is just to the northwest of Evans High School. Just west of an intersection with the northern terminus of Galway Drive and the southern terminus of Lake Jean Drive, the highway begins a curve to the east. At the very next intersection, one with the northern terminus of Parkview Drive and the southern terminus of Lawrence Drive, it curves to the east-southeast and meets its northern terminus, an intersection with SR 383 (North Belair Road) in the main part of town. Here, the roadway continues as Towne Centre Drive.

Hereford Farm Road was built in 1965. In 2004, SR 388 was extended along Hereford Farm Road. In 2007, it was removed from Hereford Farm Road.

The entire route is in Columbia County.

Location	mi	km	Destinations	Notes
Lewiston	0.0	0.0	SR 232 (Columbia Road) / SR 388 south (Lewiston Road) – Martinez, Grovetown, Appling, Patriots Park, Fair ground	Southern terminus of Hereford Farm Road; northern terminus of SR 388 and Lewiston Road
Evans	5.6	9.0	North Belair Road (SR 383) / Towne Centre Drive north	Northern terminus of Hereford Farm Road; southern terminus of Towne Centre Drive
1.000 mi = 1.609 km; 1.000 km = 0.621 mi

=== Towne Centre Drive ===
Towne Centre Drive
- Location: Evans
- Length: 0.3 mi (480 m)

Towne Centre Drive is the name for what is essentially an eastern extension of Hereford Farm Road. It is a connector in Evans between Hereford Farm Road and SR 104 (Washington Road) and the western terminus of River Watch Parkway. Towne Centre Drive is only a 0.3-mile-long (500 m) route. Even though Georgia does not sign its county highways, except for on green street signs, Towne Centre Drive is Columbia County Route 1520 (CR 1520).

The highway begins at an intersection with SR 383 (North Belair Road) and the northern terminus of Hereford Farm Road in Evans and travels to the east-southeast. It passes the Evans campus of University Hospital and then curves to the east-northeast before meeting its northern terminus, an intersection with SR 104 (Washington Road). Here, the roadway continues as Riverwatch Parkway. Towne Centre Drive provides access to local businesses.

The entire route is in Evans, Columbia County.

mi	km	Destinations	Notes
0.0	0.0	North Belair Road (SR 383) / Hereford Farm Road south	Southern terminus of Towne Centre Drive; northern terminus of Hereford Farm Road
0.3	0.48	Washington Road (SR 104) / River Watch Parkway east	Northern terminus of Towne Centre Drive; western terminus of Riverwatch Parkway
1.000 mi = 1.609 km; 1.000 km = 0.621 mi
