= Wrightsboro Road =

Major road in east-central Georgia, United States

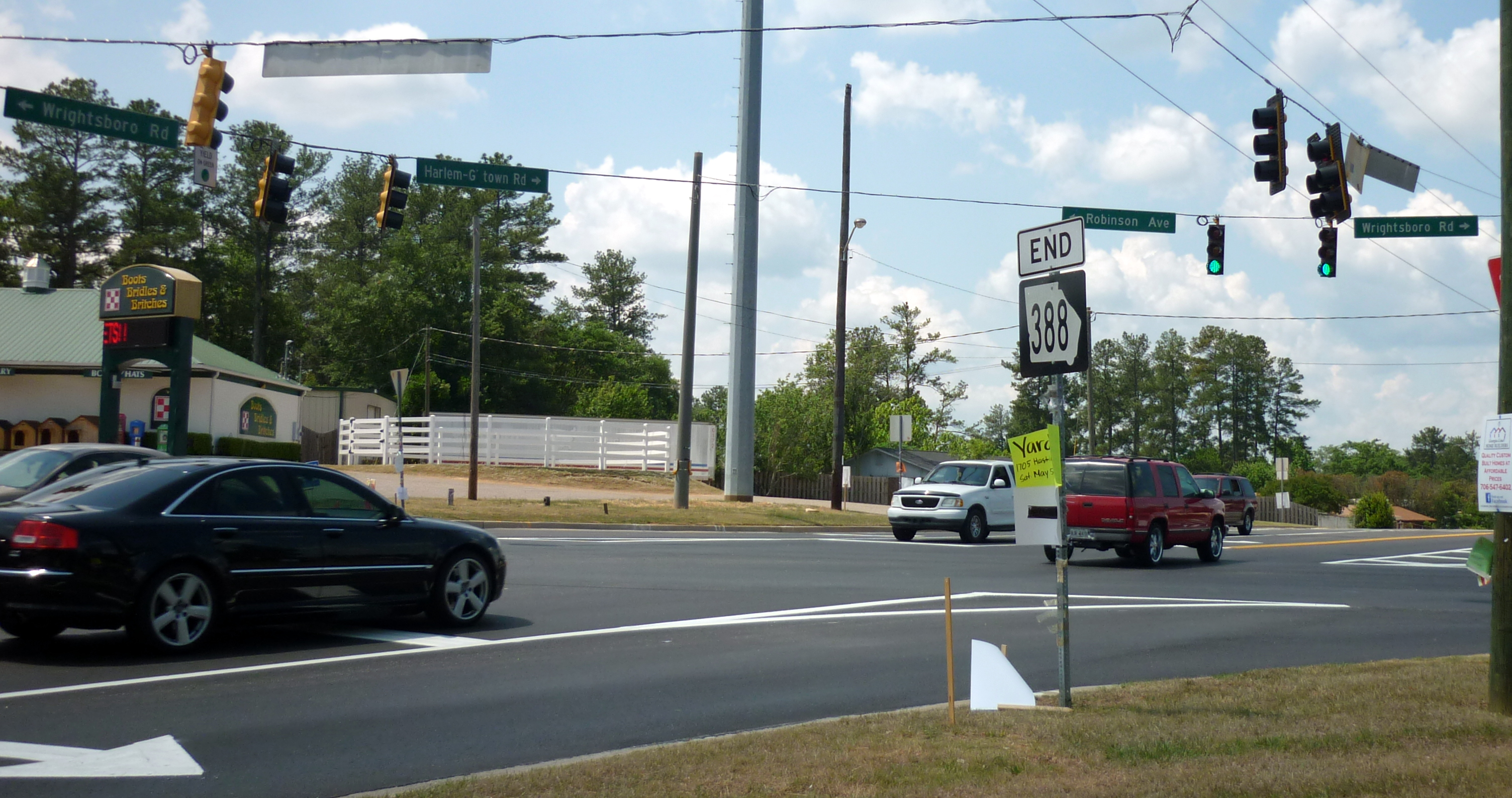
- Part of: SR 80 from near Cadley to southeast of Washington; SR 223 from near Thomson to Grovetown; SR 388 in Grovetown
- Length: 45.0 mi (72.4 km); Western segment 20.3 mi (32.7 km); Eastern segment 24.7 mi (39.8 km)
- Location: McDuffie, Warren, Wilkes, Columbia, and Richmond counties in Georgia, United States
- South end: SR 17 in Thomson
- Major junctions: SR 80 near Cadley; US 78 / SR 10 / SR 17 / SR 80 southeast of Washington; SR 223 at Hinton Wilson Road east-northeast of Thomson; US 221 / SR 47 north of Harlem; SR 223 / SR 388 in Grovetown; SR 388 in Grovetown; SR 383 west of Augusta; I-520 in Augusta
- East end: James Brown Boulevard in Augusta

Wrightsboro Road is a 45-mile-long (72 km) major road in the east-central part of the U.S. state of Georgia, traveling through the northwestern part of McDuffie County, the extreme northern part of Warren County, the southeastern part of Wilkes County, the southern part of Columbia County, and the northeastern part of Richmond County.

It consists of two disconnected segments. The western segment, which is a north–south highway, extends 20.3 miles (32.7 km) from Georgia State Route 17 (SR 17) and the northern terminus of Harrison Road in Thomson to US 78/SR 10/SR 17 southeast of Washington. This is also the northern terminus of SR 80. The eastern segment, which is an east–west highway, extends 24.7 miles (39.8 km) from SR 223 and Hinton Wilson Road east-northeast of Thomson to James Brown Boulevard in Augusta. Even though Georgia does not sign its county highways, except for on green street signs, the western segment's McDuffie County portion is McDuffie County Route 308 (CR 308); the eastern segment's Columbia County portion is Columbia CR 571.

The western segment is mostly a rural highway. In fact, some of its path is a dirt road. Except for the northern part of SR 80 between Cadley and Washington, it is an unnumbered highway. At the western end of the eastern segment, it is also fairly rural, but at its eastern end, it is an urban corridor of the Augusta metropolitan area. It connects rural areas of southwestern Columbia County with Grovetown and Augusta. It also serves as the main entry point to Augusta Mall. From its western terminus, east-northeast of Thomson, to Grovetown, it is signed as part of SR 223. In Grovetown, it is signed as part of SR 388. East of Grovetown, it is an unnumbered highway.

It was named after Wrightsboro, a settlement formed in 1768 by British Royal Governor James Wright. It was a settlement for displaced Quakers from North Carolina. Later, Thomson, Dearing, and Wrightsboro were merged with parts of Warren County to form McDuffie County.

== Route description ==
=== Western segment ===
McDuffie County

Wrightsboro Road begins at an intersection with SR 17 (Washington Road) in the north-central part of Thomson, in the central part of McDuffie County. This intersection is also the northern terminus of Harrison Road. It travels to the west-northwest and immediately curves to the north-northwest. It then leaves the city limits of Thomson. Just south of an intersection with the eastern terminus of Ridgeview Drive, the highway begins a curve to the north-northeast. Just north of an intersection with the western terminus of Daniel Place (CR 200), it travels over, but does not have an interchange with Interstate 20 (I-20). Immediately, Wrightsboro Road curves back to the north-northwest. North of an intersection with the western terminus of Knox Rivers Road NW (CR 20), it curves to the west-northwest. It then crosses over Mattox Creek. Just south of an intersection with the northern terminus of 3 Points Road (CR 021), the highway curves to the north. Just south of an intersection with the western terminus of Stagecoach Road, it begins to curve to the west-northwest. It crosses over Middle Creek. It then travels through Wrightsboro and then curves to the northwest. Northwest of an intersection with Ridge Road, the highway crosses over Hart Creek. It crosses over Factory Creek and then curves to the north-northwest. North of an intersection with the eastern terminus of Giles Road, it curves back to the northwest. It then intersects SR 80 on the McDuffie–Warren county line. SR 80 and Wrightsboro Road travel concurrently to the north-northeast, briefly on the county line. Almost immediately, they enter the extreme northern part of Warren County.

Warren and Wilkes counties

SR 80 and Wrightsboro Road slip into Warren County for just over 2,000 feet (610 m). During this short piece, they curve to the north-northeast. Then, they briefly travel on the Warren–McDuffie county line. At a crossing of Little River Creek, they enter the southeastern part of Wilkes County. Immediately, they curve to the northwest and begin paralleling Cedar Creek. Just south of an intersection with the northern terminus of Macedonia Church Road, they curve to the north-northwest. South of an intersection with the western terminus of Big Cedar Road (CR 197), the creek ends. They curve to the north-northeast and cross over Rocky Creek. Immediately, they curve back to the north-northwest. Approximately 1.5 miles (2.4 km) later, they both reach their northern terminus, an intersection with US 78/SR 10/SR 17 (Thomson Road).

=== Eastern segment ===
Columbia County

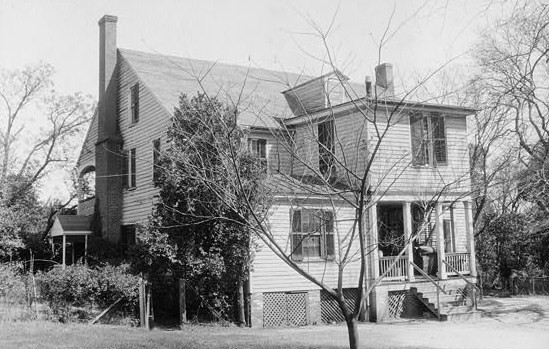
Harper House

Wrightsboro Road resumes at an intersection with Georgia State Route 223 (SR 223) and the northern terminus of Hinton Wilson Road, east-northeast of Thomson, in Columbia County. West-northwest of this intersection, SR 223 has the local name of East White Oak Road. At this intersection, SR 223 assumes Wrightsboro Road as its local street name. They then cross over Kiokee Creek and have a slight northward jog before continuing to the southeast. Approximately 0.5 miles (0.80 km) later, they intersect US 221/SR 47 (Appling–Harlem Road) at a roundabout. SR 223/Wrightsboro Road then curve to a more east-southeasterly routing and cross over Little Kiokee Creek. Then, they travel just south of Euchee Creek Elementary School and Euchee Creek Library. A short distance later, the roadway crosses over the northern terminus of the Grovetown Trails at Euchee Creek and the creek itself, briefly skirting along the northwestern city limits of Grovetown in the process. A few hundred feet later, the road crosses into Grovetown proper and has an intersection with the eastern terminus of Harlem–Grovetown Road. This intersection also marks the southern terminus of SR 388, which takes on the Wrightsboro Road name, while SR 223 continues to the southeast, known as East Robinson Avenue. SR 388 (Wrightsboro Road) travel to the left and in a northeasterly direction, before curving to the east. Along the way, the roadway is lined with numerous retail businesses on both sides of the road. They also travel along the southeastern edge of Goodale Park. At an intersection with the northern terminus of Katherine Street, SR 388 splits off to the north-northeast, onto the southern end of Horizon South Parkway, while Wrightsboro Road continues to the east. It leaves the city limits just before passing by the Grovetown post office. Then, it transitions into more of a residential roadway and begins to gradually turn to the northeast. Just to the east of Bellevue Memorial Gardens, a cemetery, it curves back to the east-southeast and intersects SR 383 (Jimmie Dyess Parkway). Immediately after this intersection, the road enters Richmond County and the city limits of Augusta.

Richmond County

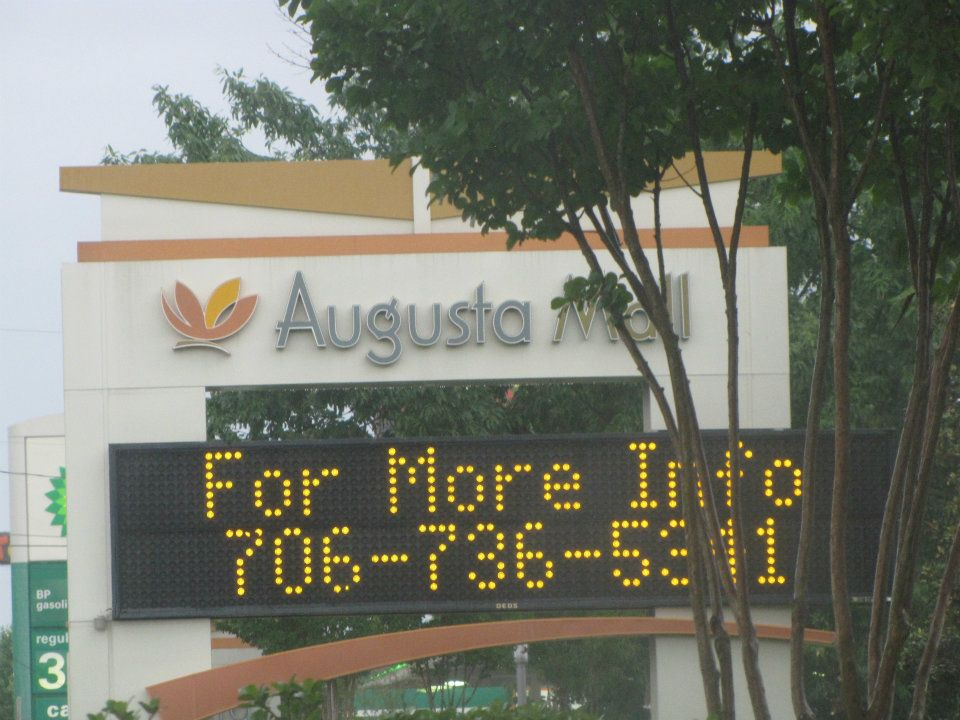
Augusta Mall sign

As soon as the road travels through the SR 383 intersection, it curves to the south-southeast and immediately curves to an easterly direction. It travels north of Sue Reynolds Elementary School and then makes a gradual curve to the southeast. At the eastern terminus of Belair Road, Wrightsboro Road curves to the east-northeast and transitions into a more business-oriented roadway. It has an intersection with the southern terminus of Augusta West Parkway, which serves as a frontage road for the western side of Interstate 520 (I-520; Bobby Jones Expressway), and the northern terminus of Barton Chapel Road. After that intersection, Wrightsboro Road has an interchange with the Interstate highway itself. Immediately after this interchange are two entrance roads to Augusta Mall. An intersection with the southern terminus of Marks Church Road, which serves as a frontage road for the east side of I-520, as well as the northern terminus of Garden Spring Lane, which also leads to the mall, is next. Just after this intersection, is an intersection with Capps Road, which is the last road off Wrightsboro Road to lead to the mall. From I-520, Wrightsboro Road is lined with businesses on both sides of the highway. At the intersection with the northern terminus of North Leg Road and the southern terminus of Jackson Road, Wrightsboro Road travels just south of Copeland Elementary School. Three blocks later, it skirts along the southern edge of Augusta University's (AU) Forest Hills campus and Forest Hills Golf Club. Then, it skirts along the northern edge of Augusta Municipal Golf Course and Daniel Field, a public use airport. Just past Daniel Field, Wrightsboro Road travels between AU's Summerville campus and the Charlie Norwood VA Medical Center. The roadway skirts along the southern edge of Monte Sano Elementary School. It travels just south of Paine College. On the southwest corner of AU's main campus, Wrightsboro Road travels under, but does not have an intersection with, SR 4 (15th Street), although there is a ramp that leads to Wrightsboro Road. It then crosses over some railroad tracks of CSX and curves to the southeast, passing just to the southwest of Lucy Craft Laney High School, C. T. Walker Traditional Magnet School, and A. R. Johnson Health Science and Engineering Magnet High School. Just over 1,000 feet (300 m) later, the roadway meets its eastern terminus, at an intersection with James Brown Boulevard, just north of that road's southern terminus at Twiggs Street and Nicholas Street.

=== National Highway System ===
The only portion of Wrightsboro Road that is part of the National Highway System, a system of routes determined to be the most important for the nation's economy, mobility, and defense, are as follows:

- From just east of SR 223's intersection with Chamblin Road, in the northwestern part of Grovetown, to the SR 4 overpass in Augusta.

== History ==
From the 1770s to mid-1780s, the western segment of Wrightsboro Road was constructed. from 1787 to early 1790s, the final segment of the road was constructed. In 1916, the Augusta fire of 1916 damaged some parts of the arterial street and was rebuilt. In 1966, Wrightsboro Road served the eastern terminus of SR 232/Bobby Jones Expressway until the 1970s. In the fall of 2012, Reeves Construction Company of Macon was awarded a contract to widen Wrightsboro Road from two to four lanes between Jimmie Dyess Parkway and I-520. This was partially done to protect Flowing Wells Spring, a historic spring that was built to provide water to Sue Reynolds Elementary School. In 2016, the Georgia Department of Transportation decided to transform the I-520 interchange to a contraflow left diamond interchange but the project was canceled, so construction started in the spring of 2019.

== Major intersections ==
County	Location	mi	km	Destinations	Notes
McDuffie	Thomson	0.0	0.0	SR 17 (Washington Road) / Harrison Road south – Wrens, Washington	Southern terminus of Wrightsboro Road's western segment; northern terminus of Harrison Road
Warren–McDuffie county line		12.3	19.8	SR 80 south – Cadley	Southern end of SR 80 concurrency
Warren	No major junctions				
Warren–McDuffie county line	No major junctions				
Warren–McDuffie–Wilkes county tripoint	No major junctions				
Wilkes		20.3	32.7	US 78 / SR 10 / SR 17 (Thomson Road) – Thomson, Elberton, Washington, Athens	Northern end of SR 80 concurrency; northern terminus of western segment of Wrightsboro Road and SR 80
Gap in route
Columbia		20.3	32.7	SR 223 west (East White Oak Road) / Hinton Wilson Road south – Thomson	Western end of SR 223 concurrency; western terminus of eastern segment; northern terminus of Hinton Wilson Road
Columbia		24.1	38.8	US 221 / SR 47 (Appling–Harlem Road) – Harlem, Appling	Roundabout
Columbia	Grovetown	30.8	49.6	SR 223 east (East Robinson Avenue) / SR 388 begins / Harlem–Grovetown Road west – Grovetown, Fort Gordon	Eastern end of SR 223 concurrency; western end of SR 388 concurrency; southern terminus of SR 388; eastern terminus of Harlem–Grovetown Road
Columbia	Grovetown	31.6	50.9	SR 388 north (Horizon South Parkway north) / Katherine Street south to I-20	Eastern end of SR 388 concurrency; northern terminus of Katherine Street; southern terminus of Horizon South Parkway
Columbia		35.7	57.5	Jimmie Dyess Parkway (SR 383)	
Richmond	Augusta	38.6	62.1	I-520 (Bobby Jones Expressway / SR 415) to I-20	I-520 exit 2
Richmond	Augusta	43.8	70.5	SR 4 (15th Street)	No access from Wrightsboro Road to SR 4 or from SR 4 south to Wrightsboro Road; Rosa T. Beard Memorial Bridge
Richmond	Augusta	45.0	72.4	James Brown Boulevard north / Twiggs Street / Nicholas Street south	Eastern terminus of Wrightsboro Road; southern terminus of James Brown Boulevard; northern terminus of Nicholas Street; roundabout; James Brown Boulevard is signed as its former name of 9th Street, which is misspelled as "Ninth Street". Five way roundabout
1.000 mi = 1.609 km; 1.000 km = 0.621 mi: Concurrency terminus; Incomplete access

== See also ==
- Gordon Highway
- Transportation in Augusta, Georgia
