= Georgia State Route 47 =

State highway in Georgia

State Route 47
- SR 47 highlighted in red

Route information
- Maintained by GDOT
- Length: 84.86 mi (136.57 km)
- Existed: 1919–present

Major junctions
- West end: US 278 / SR 12 in Crawfordville
- US 78 / US 378 / SR 10 / SR 17 in Washington; US 378 / SR 43 in Lincolnton; US 221 / SR 104 / SR 150 in Pollards Corner; I-20 south of Appling; US 78 / US 278 / SR 10 in Harlem
- East end: US 1 / US 221 / SR 4 / SR 540 in Wrens

Location
- Country: United States
- State: Georgia
- Counties: Taliaferro, Wilkes, Lincoln, Columbia, McDuffie, Jefferson

Highway system
- Georgia State Highway System; Interstate; US; State; Special
← SR 46	→ SR 48

State Route 47 (SR 47) is an 84.86-mile-long (136.57 km) arc-shaped state highway that travels through portions of Taliaferro, Wilkes, Lincoln, Columbia, McDuffie, and Jefferson counties in the east-central part of the U.S. state of Georgia. The highway connects Crawfordville and Wrens, via Washington, Lincolnton, and Harlem.

== Route description ==
SR 47 begins at an intersection with US 278/SR 12 (Broad Street) in Crawfordville, within Taliaferro County. SR 47 runs parallel with US 278/SR 12 for about 1 mile (1.6 km). It head east-northeast to the town of Sharon, where it meets the northern terminus of SR 269 (Barnett Road SE). At this intersection, SR 47 turns to head to the north-northeast. It travels through rural areas of the county and crosses into Wilkes County. A few miles farther is a bridge over the Little River. The highway continues to the north-northeast and enters Washington. It intersects US 78 Business/SR 10 Business (Robert Toombs Avenue). The three routes head concurrently to the east. At an intersection with Poplar Drive, SR 17 Business joins the concurrency and all four head southeast. They intersect US 78/SR 10/SR 17 (Thomson Road), as well as US 378. At this intersection, all of the business routes end, US 378 begins, and SR 47 heads concurrent along US 378. Less than 1,000 feet (300 m) later, US 378/SR 47 meet the northern terminus of SR 47 Connector (Thomson Road). Then, they travel through rural areas of the county before crossing into Lincoln County. In Lincolnton, they intersect SR 43. At this intersection, US 378/SR 43 head north-northeast on Washington Street, while SR 43/SR 47 head east on Elm Avenue. Just over 1,000 feet (300 m) later, SR 43 splits off to the southeast, while SR 47 continues to the east. It curves to the southeast and intersects SR 220 before crossing over Little on the Price–Legg Bridge and entering Columbia County. At the county line, it takes on the Washington Road name. After a southerly jog, they continue to the southeast, skirting along the western edge of Pointes West Army Resort. Then, they cross over Kegg Creek on the Major Byron S. McGuire Sr. Memorial Bridge, just before skirting along the southwestern edge of Wildwood Park. Just over 1 mile (1.6 km) later, the roadway enters Pollards Corner. There, they intersect with US 221/SR 104/SR 150, SR 47 splits off to travel concurrent with US 221 south, while SR 150 splits off to travel concurrent with US 221 north. Just before entering Appling, the two roads curve to the south. They pass through Appling and meet the western terminus of SR 232 (Columbia Road). Farther to the south is a traffic circle interchange with Interstate 20 (I-20, Carl Sanders Highway) and a traffic circle intersection with SR 223 (Wrightsboro Road). The highway continues to the south and intersects US 78/US 278/SR 10 (Milledgeville Road) in Harlem. They curve to the south-southwest before entering McDuffie County. The concurrency begins to parallel the western edges of Fort Gordon and curve to the southwest. They pass through rural areas of the county, and curve back to the south-southwest, before entering Jefferson County. After leaving the Fort Gordon area they continue in a mostly southern routing and enter Wrens. On the northeastern edge of town, they intersect US 1/SR 4/SR 540 (North Main Street/Fall Line Freeway). At this intersection, SR 47 ends and US 221 turns to the right to follow US 1/SR 4/SR 540 into the main part of town.

== History ==
=== 1920s ===
SR 47 was established at least as early as 1919 on a path from Harlem to Lincolnton, via Appling. Part of SR 10 was established on the current Washington-to-Lincolnton segment. By the end of 1926, from just north of Harlem to just south of the Lincoln–Columbia county line, SR 47 had a "sand clay or top soil" surface. At this time, the portion of SR 10 between Washington and Lincolnton was shifted southward. Its former path between the two cities was redesignated as a westward extension of SR 47. All of this extension, except for the westernmost part, also had a sand clay or top soil surface. By the end of 1929, the entire Harlem–Appling and Appling–Lincolnton segments, except for the easternmost part of both segments, had a completed semi hard surface.

=== 1930s ===
In 1930, the Lincoln County portion of the Appling–Lincolnton segment was under construction. A portion in the vicinity of Washington had a sand clay or top soil surface. In January 1932, SR 47 was extended southwest on a direct path to Crawfordville. The next year, the entire Washington–Lincolnton segment, except for the easternmost part, was under construction. In mid-1934, the path between Crawfordville and Washington was shifted to a more eastern curve. Near the end of 1936, a small portion of the highway southeast of Lincolnton had a completed hard surface. In 1937, the Harlem–Appling segment, as well as the Wilkes County portion of the Crawfordville–Washington segment, was under construction. Later that year, SR 47 was extended south and then southeast to US 1/SR 4 south-southeast of Harlem at a point that is currently in the southwest part of Fort Gordon. Also, a small portion south of the Lincoln–Columbia county line had a completed hard surface. The next year, the Lincoln County portion of the Washington–Lincolnton segment had a completed hard surface. By mid-1939, the McDuffie County portion of the Harlem extension had completed grading, but was not surfaced; while the Columbia County portion was under construction. Also, the segment from Leah to Lincolnton had a completed hard surface. A few months later, the Wilkes County portion of the Washington–Lincolnton segment had a completed hard surface. At the end of the year, the Harlem extension was under construction.

=== 1940s ===
In 1941 Fort Gordon was established. Because of this, SR 47 was truncated to Avondale, south-southwest of Harlem. By the end of 1941, a small portion of SR 47 north-northeast of the Wilkes–Taliaferro county line was under construction. In 1944, this portion had a sand clay or top soil surface. By the end of 1946, The entire highway from Washington to Harlem had a completed hard surface. Between 1946 and 1948, the entire Crawfordville–Washington segment (except for its eastern part) had a sand clay or top soil surface. The eastern part had completed grading, but was not surfaced. The next year, the Columbia County portion of the Harlem extension, as well as the entire Taliaferro County portion, had a completed hard surface.

=== 1950s ===
By the middle of 1950, the Wilkes County portion of the Crawfordville–Washington segment had a completed hard surface. By the end of 1951, SR 47 was extended south-southwest around the southwest corner of Fort Gordon into the eastern part of Wrens. The western part of this extension had a completed hard surface, while the eastern part had completed grading, but was not surfaced. The next year, the path from Crawfordville to Washington was shifted west to a more direct routing. In 1953, US 378 was designated on the Lincolnton–Washington segment. The western segment was reverted to its eastern curve. The next year, US 221 was designated on the Wrens–Phinizy segment. A few years later, US 221 was shifted off of SR 47 just north of Appling, concurrent with SR 304.

=== 1980s ===
In 1987, SR 47 was shifted east to once again travel concurrent with US 221 from just north of Appling to Pollards Corner. Because of this, SR 304 was decommissioned.

== Major intersections ==
County	Location	mi	km	Destinations	Notes
Taliaferro	Crawfordville	0.000	0.000	US 278 / SR 12 (Broad Street)	Western terminus
Taliaferro	Sharon	5.747	9.249	Barnett Road SE – Barnett	Former northern terminus of SR 269
Wilkes		16.169	26.021	SR 44 Spur west (Harris Road)	Eastern terminus of SR 44 Spur
Wilkes	Washington	18.582	29.905	US 78 Bus. west / SR 10 Bus. west (West Robert Toombs Avenue)	Western end of US 78 Bus./SR 10 Bus. concurrency
Wilkes	Washington	18.976	30.539	SR 17 Bus. north (Poplar Drive)	Western end of SR 17 Bus. concurrency
Wilkes	Washington	20.198	32.506	US 78 Bus. ends / SR 10 Bus. ends / SR 17 Bus. ends (East Robert Toombs Avenue) / US 78 / SR 10 / SR 17 (Thomson Road) / US 378 begins – Lexington, Elberton, Thomson	Eastern end of US 78 Bus./SR 10 Bus. and SR 17 Bus. concurrencies; eastern terminus of US 78 Bus./SR 10 Bus. and SR 17 Bus.; western end of US 378 concurrency; western terminus of US 378
Wilkes		20.368	32.779	SR 47 Conn. south (Thomson Road)	Northern terminus of SR 47 Conn.
Lincoln		33.439	53.815	SR 220 east – Thomson	Western terminus of SR 220
Lincoln	Lincolnton	36.095	58.089	US 378 east (Washington Street) / SR 43 north (Elm Avenue/Washington Street)	Eastern end of US 378 concurrency; western end of SR 43 concurrency
Lincoln	Lincolnton	36.313	58.440	SR 43 south (May Avenue) – Thomson	Eastern end of SR 43 concurrency
Lincoln		38.584	62.095	SR 43 Conn. north – McCormick SC, Elijah Clark State Park	Southern terminus of SR 43 Conn.
Lincoln	New Hope	42.412	68.255	SR 220 – Woodlawn, Kenna	
Lake Strom Thurmond		47.517	76.471	Price–Legg Bridge; Lincoln–Columbia county line; eastern terminus of Augusta Highway; western terminus of the eastern segment of Washington Road	
Columbia	Pollards Corner	54.254	87.313	SR 150 west (Cobbham Road) – Thomson	Western end of SR 150 concurrency
Columbia	Pollards Corner	54.293	87.376	US 221 north / SR 150 east (Clarks Hill Road) / SR 104 east (Washington Road)	Eastern end of SR 150 concurrency; western end of US 221 concurrency; western terminus of SR 104
Columbia		61.275	98.613	SR 232 east (Columbia Road) – Martinez	Western terminus of SR 232
Columbia		63.818	102.705	I-20 (Carl Sanders Highway / SR 402) – Atlanta, Augusta	Traffic circle interchange; I-20 exit 183
Columbia		64.885	104.422	SR 223 (Wrightsboro Road) – Thomson, Grovetown	Traffic circle
Columbia	Harlem	69.581	111.980	US 78 / US 278 / SR 10 (Milledgeville Road)	
McDuffie	No major junctions				
Jefferson	Wrens	84.861	136.571	US 1 / US 221 south (North Main Street) / SR 4 / SR 540 (Fall Line Freeway)	Eastern terminus; eastern end of US 221 concurrency
1.000 mi = 1.609 km; 1.000 km = 0.621 mi: Concurrency terminus

== Bannered route ==
State Route 47 Connector
- Location: Southeast of Washington
- Length: 0.11 mi (180 m)

State Route 47 Connector (SR 47 Conn.) is a 0.11-mile-long (0.18 km) connector route located completely within the central part of Wilkes County in the east-central part of the U.S. state of Georgia. Its entire length is just southeast of Washington. It is known as Thomson Road for its entire length.

It begins at an intersection with US 78/SR 10/SR 17 (Thomson Road), where the roadway continues as Denard Road. The highway travels to the northeast to meet its northern terminus, an intersection with US 378/SR 47 (Lincolnton Road).

The entire route is in Wilkes County.

Location	mi	km	Destinations	Notes
	0.000	0.000	US 78 / SR 10 / SR 17 (Thomson Road) – Thomson, Washington	Southern terminus; roadway continues as Denard Road.
	0.111	0.179	US 378 / SR 47 (Lincolnton Road) – Lincolnton	Northern terminus
1.000 mi = 1.609 km; 1.000 km = 0.621 mi
