= Georgia State Route 104 =

State highway in Georgia, United States

State Route 104
- SR 104 highlighted in red

Route information
- Maintained by GDOT
- Length: 22.3 mi (35.9 km)
- Existed: August 1932–present

Major junctions
- West end: US 221 / SR 47 / SR 150 in Pollards Corner
- SR 383 in Evans; SR 232 in Martinez; SR 104 Conn. in Augusta; SR 28 in Augusta; I-20 in Augusta
- East end: US 25 Bus. / SR 4 in Augusta

Location
- Country: United States
- State: Georgia
- Counties: Columbia, Richmond

Highway system
- Georgia State Highway System; Interstate; US; State; Special
← SR 103	→ SR 105

State Route 104 (SR 104) is a 22.3-mile-long (35.9 km) state highway in the east-central part of the U.S. state of Georgia. Most of its eastern portion is an urban corridor in the Augusta metropolitan area. It travels within portions of Columbia and Richmond counties. It is known as Washington Road from its western terminus to the Columbia–Richmond county line. On both sides of the county line, it is known as Pleasant Home Road. It is known as Riverwatch Parkway from just west of the county line to the northern part of downtown Augusta. In downtown, it is known as part of Jones Street and Reynolds Street.

== Route description ==
SR 104 begins at a blinker-light intersection with U.S. Route 221 (US 221), SR 47, and SR 150 in Pollards Corner. It travels to the southeast as part of Washington Road and crosses over Kiokee Creek on the Robert W. Pollard Bridge. Just over 1.5 miles (2.4 km) later, it crosses over Little Kiokee Creek on the B. Edward Tankersley Memorial Bridge. Slightly more than 2 miles (3.2 km) after that, it crosses over Euchee Creek on the G.B. "Dip" Lamkin Bridge. Just before entering Evans, and just at the intersection with William Few Parkway, the highway transitions into a retail corridor. In Evans, it travels southwest of Evans Towne Center Park and intersects the northern terminus of SR 383 (North Belair Road). SR 104 curves to the south-southeast and intersects both the eastern terminus of Towne Centre Drive and the western terminus of Riverwatch Parkway. It then curves to the east and intersects SR 232 (Columbia Road) and the southern terminus of Ruth Street on the Evans–Martinez line. SR 104 and SR 232 travel concurrently for approximately 0.2 miles (0.32 km). At an intersection with the southern terminus of Old Evans Road, SR 232 splits off to the south-southeast onto Bobby Jones Expressway. After curving to the east-southeast, SR 104 enters Richmond County and the city limits of Augusta.

Immediately after entering the county, SR 104 intersects the western terminus of SR 104 Connector (SR 104 Conn.), which takes the Washington Road name. The mainline route turns left onto Pleasant Home Road, briefly re-enters Columbia County, and immediately turns right onto Riverwatch Parkway. Less than 500 feet (150 m) after that turn, it re-enters Richmond County. Approximately 0.5 miles (0.80 km) later, the roadway widens to six lanes temporarily as it meets SR 28 (Furys Ferry Road) before narrowing back to four lanes. Then it curves northeast to widen back to six lanes temporarily as it meets Stevens Creek Road before narrowing back again to four lanes. It curves southeast and crosses the railroad tracks linking to the Quarry. After the rail crossing, the roadway widens back to six lanes before meeting the western terminus of Riverwest Drive. SR 104 later meets eastern terminus of Claussen Road and an interchange with Interstate 20 (I-20; Carl Sanders Highway) west to Atlanta. SR 104 curves more east, crossing below I-20 before meeting an interchange with I-20 east to Columbia. SR 104 later meets the western terminus of Cabela Drive and the northern terminus of Alexander Drive before curving southeast to meet the western terminus of Topgolf Way. SR 104 narrows back to four lanes and becomes a freeway. The speed limit increases from 45 to 55 MPH. After curving around the eastern side of Eisenhower Park, the highway begins paralleling the Savannah River, before it crosses over the Augusta Canal on the William "Billy" L. Powell Jr. Bridge. The highway has an interchange that leads to downtown Augusta and the Medical District. After passing this interchange, the speed limit drops to 45 MPH. And about 1,500 feet (460 m) later is another crossing of the canal, this time on an unnamed bridge. Just after this crossing, the freeway section ends at an intersection with 15th Street, Riverwatch Parkway ends; eastbound traffic uses Jones Street, while westbound traffic uses Reynolds Street. Three blocks later, SR 104 meets its eastern terminus, an intersection with US 25 Business/SR 4 (13th Street). Here, both Jones Street and Reynolds Street continues as a two-way street.

=== National Highway System ===
All of SR 104 is included as part of the National Highway System, a system of roadways important to the nation's economy, defense, and mobility.

=== Milepost numbering ===
All of SR 104's milepost numbering increases westward instead of eastward inversely, due to a use of a south-to-north numbering instead of the usual west-to-east system.

== History ==
The road that would eventually become SR 104 was established by the middle of 1930 as SR 52 just east of the Columbia–Richmond county line. By the third quarter of 1932, SR 52 was redesignated as SR 104 and was extended northwest to Phinizy. This extension was unimproved, but maintained. By the end of 1934, a small segment was under construction northwest of the county line. By the end of the next year, a segment of the highway, farther to the northwest had completed grading, but was not surfaced. A year later, the under construction segment had completed grading, but was not surfaced. It was under construction for the rest of its length. By the end of the year, the highway had a completed hard surface from about Evans to the SR 52 intersection in Martinez. A few months later, it had a completed hard surface segment just northwest of Evans. In early 1940, it had completed grading, but was not surfaced from Phinizy to just northwest of Evans. By the end of the year, it had a sand clay or top soil surface from Phinizy to just northwest of Evans. About five years later, SR 104 had a completed hard surface from just southeast of Pollards Corner to just northwest of Evans. By the end of 1946, it was hard surfaced from Leah to just southeast of that community. By March 1948, it was hard surfaced from Pollards Corner to just southeast of that community. Before the end of the first quarter of 1949, the highway was hard surfaced from Leah to Pollards Corner. By 1988, the Leah-to-Pollards Corner segment was redesignated as SR 47, due to that highway being shifted to the east.

Riverwatch Parkway was originally constructed in the late 1980s and early 1990s to relieve heavy rush-hour traffic on congested Washington Road and John C. Calhoun Expressway, which many Augusta area residents used (and continue to use) to travel to and from work.

== Major intersections ==
County	Location	mi	km	Destinations	Notes
Columbia	Pollards Corner	0.0	0.0	US 221 south / SR 47 east (Scotts Ferry Road south) – Harlem SR 47 west (Washington Road west) / SR 150 west (Cobbham Road west) – Lincolnton, Thomson, Ft. Gordon Recreation US 221 north / SR 150 east (Clarks Hill Road north) – Clarks Hill, McCormick, S.C.	Western terminus of SR 104; eastern terminus of Cobbham Road; northern terminus of Scotts Ferry Road; southern terminus of Clarks Hill Road; SR 150 westbound turns left onto Cobbham Road about 100 feet beyond this intersection; roadway continues as SR 47 west; SR 47 takes on the Washington Road name
Columbia	Kiokee Creek	2.8	4.5	Robert W. Pollard Bridge	
Columbia	Little Kiokee Creek	4.4	7.1	B. Edward Tankersley Memorial Bridge	
Columbia	Euchee Creek	6.6	10.6	G.B. "Dip" Lamkin Bridge	
Columbia	Evans	10.4	16.7	SR 383 south (North Belair Road) to I-20	Northern terminus of SR 383
Columbia	Evans–Martinez line	13.0	20.9	SR 232 west (Columbia Road west) / Ruth Street north – Appling, Fairground, Patriots Park	Western end of SR 232 concurrency; eastern terminus of Columbia Road; southern terminus of Ruth Street
Columbia	Martinez	13.2	21.2	SR 232 east (Bobby Jones Expressway east) / Old Evans Road north to I-20 / I-520	Eastern end of SR 232 concurrency; southern terminus of Old Evans Road; western terminus of Bobby Jones Expressway
Richmond	Augusta	14.7	23.7	SR 104 Conn. east (Washington Road east) / Pleasant Home Road south	Western terminus of SR 104 Conn., which takes on the Washington Road name; SR 104 turns left onto Pleasant Home Road.
Columbia	No major junctions				
Richmond	Augusta	15.3	24.6	SR 28 (Furys Ferry Road) – McCormick, S.C.	
Richmond	Augusta	17.1	27.5	I-20 (Carl Sanders Highway / SR 402) – Atlanta, Columbia	I-20 exit 200
Richmond	Augusta Canal	19.6	31.5	William "Billy" L. Powell Jr. Bridge	
Richmond	Augusta	21.3	34.3	Downtown Augusta / Medical District (Greene Street east)	Western terminus of the western segment of Greene Street; eastbound exit and westbound entrance; interchange
Richmond	Augusta	22.3	35.9	SR 4 (US 25 Bus. / 13th Street) / Jones Street east / Reynolds Street east – Augusta Canal Boat Tour, Meadow Garden	Eastern terminus of SR 104; roadway continues to the east-southeast as a two-way traffic both at Jones Street and Reynolds Street
1.000 mi = 1.609 km; 1.000 km = 0.621 mi: Concurrency terminus; Incomplete access

== Related routes ==
=== River Watch Parkway ===
River Watch Parkway
- Location: Evans–Augusta
- Length: 10.5 mi (16.9 km)

River Watch Parkway, sometimes spelt as Riverwatch Parkway, is a 10.5-mile-long (16.9 km) four-lane parkway with a raised median, going from Evans to downtown Augusta.

It starts going east from SR 104 (Washington Road) and the northern terminus of Towne Centre Drive in Evans. The roadway continues as Towne Centre Drive towards to Fort Gordon and Grovetown beyond south of SR 104 (Washington Road). Then curves southeast to cross above the railroad tracks and meet the western terminus of Columbia Industrial Drive, which serves to industrial and commercial businesses before reaching its eastern terminus at Evans-To-Locks Road. River Watch Parkway continues southeast to meet the western terminuses of Old Evans Road and Blue Ridge Drive. Blue Ridge Drive provides access to the schools of Lakeside High, Lakeside Middle, and Blue Ridge Elementary. Then it curves back to the east, then passing the neighborhoods, and leaving the city limits of Evans and entering Martinez before meeting Baston Road. Then River Watch Parkway parallels the railroad tracks and SR 104 (Washington Road) before remeeting SR 104 at the eastern terminus of Pleasant Home Road.

SR 104 joins along with River Watch Parkway, then shortly crossing the county line to leave Columbia County and enter Richmond County. SR 104 and River Watch Parkway also immediately enters the city limits of Augusta. SR 104 and River Watch Parkway parallels the canal until meeting a partial interchange with the western terminus of the western segment of Greene Street. The freeway ends shorting and speed limit reduces back to 45 MPH after this interchange and River Watch Parkway meets its eastern terminus at an intersection of the northern terminus of 15th Street and the western terminus of Waters Edge Drive. SR 104 continues past its terminus as 35 MPH one-way pair streets of Jones Street (which the eastbound lanes continues to) and Reynolds Street (which the westbound lanes continues from) toward downtown Augusta.

History

In 2017, River Watch Parkway was extended westward from Pleasant Home Road to Washington Road and Towne Centre Drive, after the completion of widening the remainder of the roadway from two-lane undivided road into four-lane divided highway. The extension was built to relieve congestion on Washington Road from Evans To Martinez. The roadway was formerly named as Old Petersburg Road, from its stretch from an intersection of Old Evans Road and Blue Ridge Drive, eastward to Pleasant Home Road. Old Petersburg Road was already four lanes with a raised divided median, from the west of Baston Road to Pleasant Home Road, before the roadway being renamed to River Watch Parkway. Same year, the stretch of Old Evans Road from Blue Ridge Drive to Columbia Industrial Boulevard was supplanted into the western extension of River Watch Parkway. The remainder stretch of Old Evans Road from Columbia Industrial Boulevard to its former western terminus at Washington Road was renamed to Rountree Way.

Major intersections

County	Location	mi	km	Destinations	Notes
Columbia	Evans	0.0	0.0	SR 104 (Washington Road) / Towne Centre Drive south	Western terminus of River Watch Parkway; roadway continues as Towne Centre Drive
Columbia	Martinez	3.5	5.6	SR 104 west (Pleasant Home Road west) – Martinez, Lincolnton	Western end of SR 104 concurrency; eastern terminus of Pleasant Home Road
See SR 104’s Milepost Number (14.7–21.3)
Richmond	Augusta	10.5	16.9	SR 104 east (Jones Street east / Reynolds Street west) / 15th Street south / Waters Edge Drive east	Eastern terminus of River Watch Parkway; northern terminus of 15th Street; western terminus of Waters Edge Drive; eastern end of SR 104 concurrency; roadway continues as one-way pair streets of Jones Street and Reynolds Street; SR 104 eastbound takes on the Jones Street name while SR 104 westbound takes on the Reynolds Street name
1.000 mi = 1.609 km; 1.000 km = 0.621 mi: Concurrency terminus

=== Augusta connector route ===
State Route 104 Connector
- Location: Augusta
- Length: 0.6 mi (970 m)

State Route 104 Connector (SR 104 Conn.) is a 0.6-mile-long (0.97 km) connector route that exists entirely within the northern part of Richmond County. Its entire route is within the city limits of Augusta. It is known as Washington Road for its entire length.

It begins just east of the Columbia-Richmond county line, at an intersection with the SR 104 mainline (also known as Washington Road west of this intersection and turns onto Pleasant Home Road at it). The highway travels east-southeast until it meets its eastern terminus, an intersection with SR 28 (known as Furys Ferry Road west of this intersection and takes on the Washington Road name at it).

All of SR 104 Connector is included as part of the National Highway System.

Major intersections

The entire route is in Augusta, Richmond County.

mi	km	Destinations	Notes
0.0	0.0	SR 104 (Washington Road west / Pleasant Home Road)	Western terminus; SR 104 takes on the Washington Road name.
0.6	0.97	SR 28 (Furys Ferry Road west / Washington Road east) / Kings Chapel Road south – McCormick, S.C., Modoc, S.C., Strom Thurmond / Clarks Hill Lake	Eastern terminus of SR 104 Conn.; northern terminus of Kings Chapel Road; SR 28 takes on the Washington Road name.
1.000 mi = 1.609 km; 1.000 km = 0.621 mi
