= Georgia State Route 383 =

State highway in Georgia

State Route 383
- SR 383 highlighted in red

Route information
- Maintained by GDOT
- Length: 7.4 mi (11.9 km)
- Existed: 1987–present

Major junctions
- South end: US 78 / US 278 / SR 10 in Augusta
- I-20 on Martinez–Evans line; SR 232 on Martinez–Evans line
- North end: SR 104 in Evans

Location
- Country: United States
- State: Georgia
- Counties: Richmond, Columbia

Highway system
- Georgia State Highway System; Interstate; US; State; Special
← SR 382	→ SR 384

State Route 383 (SR 383) is a 7.4-mile-long (11.9 km) state highway in the east-central part of the U.S. state of Georgia. It is located within portions of Richmond and Columbia counties. It connects Fort Gordon with Martinez and Evans.

The highway is known as Jimmie Dyess Parkway from its southern terminus to an intersection with Park West Drive, one block south of the interchange with Interstate 20 (I-20). It is named after Lieutenant Colonel Aquilla James "Jimmie" Dyess, a United States Marine Corps officer who was a posthumous recipient of the Medal of Honor for "conspicuous gallantry and intrepidity at the risk of his life" at the head of his troops during World War II in the Battle of Kwajalein, on Roi-Namur, Kwajalein Atoll, Marshall Islands on February 2, 1944. The highway is also known as South Belair Road from Park West Drive to SR 232 (Columbia Road) and North Belair Road for the rest of its length. SR 383 serves as an important access route leading from Fort Gordon to the local area.

== Route description ==
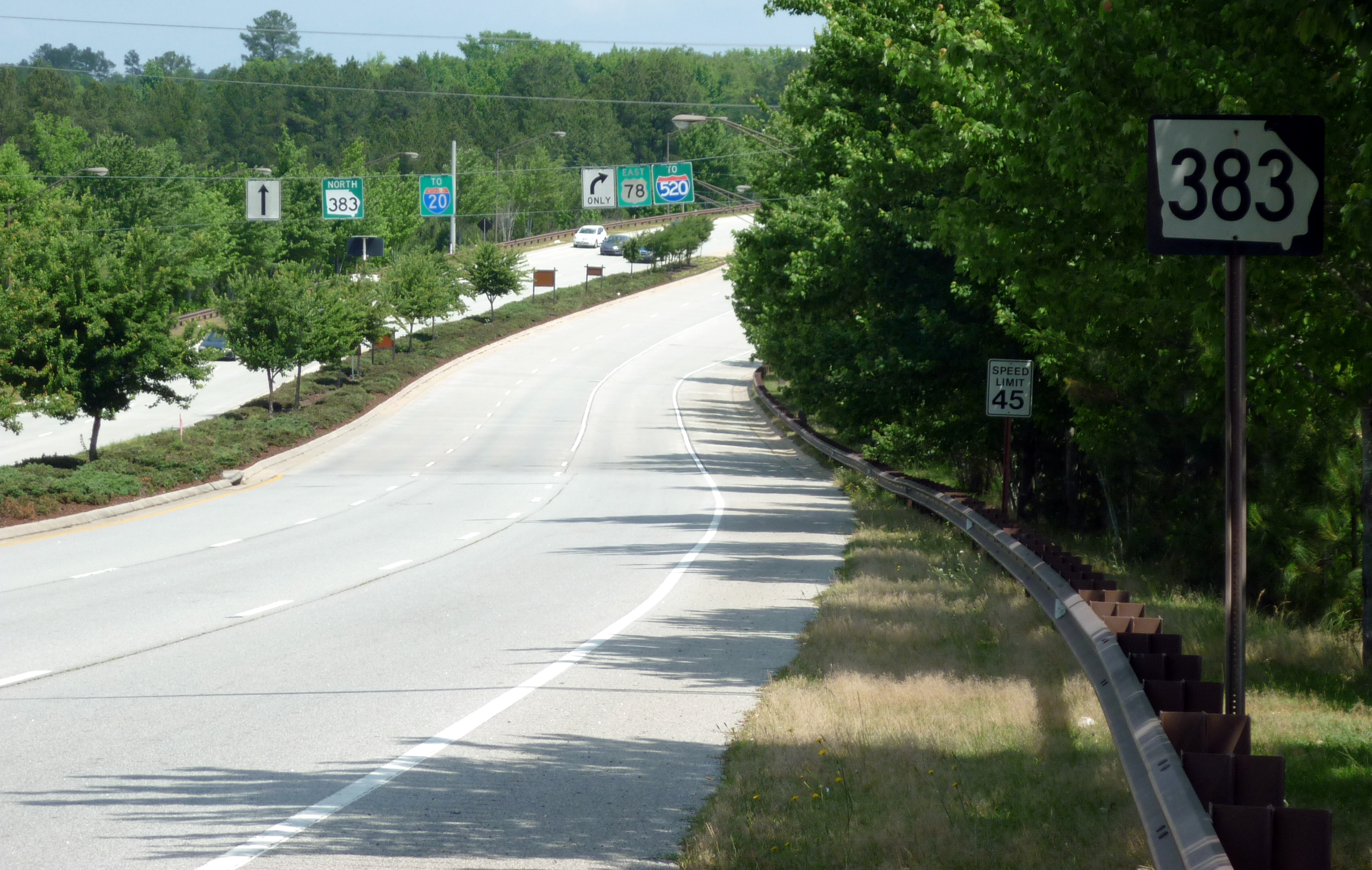
Picture of an SR 383 shield just north of Fort Gordon's Gate 1, just south of the intersection with US 78/US 278/SR 10. This shield is misplaced, as SR 383 doesn't actually begin until that intersection.

SR 383 begins at an intersection with US 78/US 278/SR 10 (Gordon Highway) approximately 0.5 miles (0.80 km) north of Fort Gordon's Gate 1, in Augusta, in Richmond County. The highway heads northward, then curves north-northwesterly. It intersects Wrightsboro Road along the Columbia County line. Just south of an interchange with Interstate 20 (I-20; Carl Sanders Highway), the highway intersects both the eastern terminus of Park West Drive and the western terminus of Belair Frontage Road, where the local name changes from Jimmie Dyess Parkway to South Belair Road. After the I-20 interchange, SR 383 intersects Wheeler Road and travels along the Martinez–Evans line to an intersection with SR 232 (Columbia Road), where it takes on the North Belair Road local name. Immediately afterward, the highway enters Evans proper and curves to the northeast. In the main part of Evans, it has an intersection with the eastern terminus of Hereford Farm Road and the western terminus of Towne Centre Drive. Approximately 1,500 feet (460 m) later, SR 383 meets its northern terminus, an intersection with SR 104 (Washington Road). Here, North Belair Road continues northwest of Martinez to SR 28 (Furys Ferry Road).

All of SR 383 is part of the National Highway System, a system of routes determined to be the most important for the nation's economy, mobility and defense.

== History ==
The road that would eventually become SR 383 was built in 1960 along the same alignment as it travels today, however, it only traveled from about Wrightsboro Road to its northern terminus. By 1988, part of this section from the I-20 interchange to its northern terminus was designated as SR 383. By 1992, SR 383 was proposed to be extended southward to US 78/US 278/SR 10 (Gordon Highway). By 1999, the road was extended to its current southern terminus. It is unknown if this extension was designated as part of SR 383 at this time.

== Major intersections ==
County	Location	mi	km	Destinations	Notes
Richmond	Augusta	0.0	0.0	US 78 (US 278 / SR 10 / Gordon Highway) to I-520 – Harlem, Augusta, Fort Gordon, Augusta State Medical Prison, United States Army Signal Corps Museum	Southern terminus of SR 383 and Jimmie Dyess Parkway; roadway continues to Fort Gordon's Gate 1.
Columbia	Evans–Martinez line	3.1	5.0	I-20 (Carl Sanders Highway / SR 402) – Atlanta, Augusta	I-20 exit 194
Columbia	Evans–Martinez line	5.0	8.0	SR 232 (Columbia Road) – Appling, Martinez, Fairground, Patriots Park	
Columbia	Evans	7.4	11.9	SR 104 (Washington Road) / North Belair Road north – Lincolnton, Martinez	Northern terminus; North Belair Road continues past terminus.
1.000 mi = 1.609 km; 1.000 km = 0.621 mi
