= Georgia State Route 232 =

State highway in Georgia

State Route 232
- SR 232 highlighted in red

Route information
- Maintained by GDOT
- Length: 14.3 mi (23.0 km)
- Existed: 1939–present

Major junctions
- West end: US 221 / SR 47 south of Appling
- SR 388 in Lewiston; SR 383 on the Evans–Martinez city line; SR 104 on the Evans–Martinez city line
- East end: I-20 / I-520 in Augusta

Location
- Country: United States
- State: Georgia
- Counties: Columbia, Richmond

Highway system
- Georgia State Highway System; Interstate; US; State; Special
← SR 231	→ SR 233

State Route 232 (SR 232) is a 14.3-mile-long (23.0 km) east–west state highway located in the east-central part of the U.S. state of Georgia. It travels through west-central Columbia County and northeastern Richmond County. At its western end, it is a fairly rural highway, but its eastern end is an urban corridor of the Augusta metropolitan area. It connects Appling with Evans, Martinez, and Augusta.

== Route description ==
SR 232 begins at an intersection with US 221/SR 47 (Appling–Harlem Highway) just south of Appling, in west-central Columbia County. The highway travels to the east-southeast to intersect with Louisville Road. Just over 1 mile (1.6 km) later, it crosses over Little Kiokee Creek. Just to the east-southeast of the intersection with William Few Parkway – a highway that connects nearby Grovetown to areas northwest of Evans – is the main entrance to Patriots Park. Immediately past the park, SR 232 passes Bartram Trail Golf Course. On the eastern edge of the course is a bridge over Euchee Creek. To the east is a strategic intersection: the western terminus of Hereford Farm Road (which leads to northwestern parts of Evans) to the north and the northern terminus of SR 388 (Lewiston Road; which leads to Grovetown) to the south. Later on is a bridge over Steiner Creek. At the intersection with South Old Belair Road, the highway begins to skirt along the edge of the city limits of Evans. At the bridge over Crawford Creek, SR 232 enters Evans proper. Farther to the east, it intersects SR 383 (South Belair Road / North Belair Road). Starting at this intersection, SR 232 travels along the Evans–Martinez line. At the eastern end of that section, it intersects SR 104 (Washington Road). At this intersection, they begin a brief concurrency and enter Martinez proper. At the intersection with the southern terminus of Old Evans Road, SR 232 turns south-southeasterly onto Bobby Jones Expressway. It enters Richmond County and the city limits of Augusta. Just after the county line, it has an interchange with Scott Nixon Memorial Drive, and then immediately meets its eastern terminus at an interchange with Interstate 20 (I-20; Carl Sanders Highway). The roadway continues as the western end of I-520, which is also known as Bobby Jones Expressway.

The only part of SR 232 that is included as part of the National Highway System, a system of routes determined to be the most important for the nation's economy, mobility and defense, is the section east of the western intersection with SR 104.

== History ==
SR 232 was established between July and October 1939 along an alignment from its western terminus to its western intersection with SR 104, however it was designated as part of SR 150.

In 1945, this section was redesignated as SR 232.

In 1950, the road was paved from its western terminus to approximately 5 miles (8.0 km) farther to the east.

In 1953, the entire original section was paved.

By 1966, the rest of the road's length was paved, with a proposal to extend it along the current route of I-520, at least as far as US 25/SR 121.

== Major intersections ==
County	Location	mi	km	Destinations	Notes
Columbia		0.0	0.0	US 221 / SR 47 (Appling–Harlem Road) to I-20 – Harlem, Appling, Clark Hill	Western terminus
Columbia	Lewiston	6.8	10.9	SR 388 south (Lewiston Road) / Hereford Farm Road north to I-20 – Grovetown, Evans	Northern terminus of SR 388; southern terminus of Hereford Farm Road
Columbia	Evans–Martinez line	10.4	16.7	SR 383 (South Belair Road south / North Belair Road north) to I-20 – Fort Gordon, Evans	Northern terminus of South Belair Road; southern terminus of North Belair Road
Columbia	Evans–Martinez line	12.9	20.8	SR 104 west (Washington Road) / Ruth Street north – Evans, Martinez, Lincolnton	Western end of SR 104 concurrency; southern terminus of Ruth Street
Columbia	Martinez	13.1	21.1	SR 104 east (Washington Road) / Old Evans Road north / Bobby Jones Expressway begins – Augusta	Eastern end of SR 104 concurrency; southern terminus of Old Evans Road; SR 232 turns right onto the western beginning of Bobby Jones Expressway.
Richmond	Augusta	14.0	22.5	Scott Nixon Memorial Drive	Interchange
Richmond	Augusta	14.3	23.0	I-20 (Carl Sanders Highway / SR 402) / I-520 east (Bobby Jones Expressway east / SR 415 east) – Atlanta, Columbia, Augusta, Daniel Field, Augusta Regional Airport	Eastern terminus of SR 232; western terminus of I-520 and unsigned SR 415; roadway continues as I-520/SR 415 east, which takes on the Bobby Jones Expressway name; I-520 exits 1A westbound, 1B eastbound; I-20 exit 196 westbound, 196A-B eastbound; cloverleaf interchange
1.000 mi = 1.609 km; 1.000 km = 0.621 mi: Concurrency terminus

== See also ==
- Central Savannah River Area
