= Gordon Highway =

Highway in east-central Georgia

- Part of: US 78 / US 278 / SR 10 from western terminus on southeastern edge of Harlem to eastern terminus on the Georgia–South Carolina state line on the northeastern edge of Augusta; US 1 in Augusta; US 25 / SR 121 in Augusta
- Namesake: John Brown Gordon
- Length: 22.8 mi (36.7 km)
- Location: Southeastern edge of Harlem to the Georgia–South Carolina state line on the northeastern edge of Augusta
- West end: US 78 / US 278 / SR 10 on the southeastern edge of Harlem
- Major junctions: SR 223 in Augusta; SR 383 in Augusta; I-520 in Augusta; US 1 / SR 4 in Augusta; US 25 / SR 121 in Augusta
- East end: US 1 / US 25 / US 78 / US 278 / SC 121 / SR 10 at the Georgia–South Carolina state line on the northeastern edge of Augusta

Gordon Highway is a 22.8-mile-long (36.7 km) major highway in the east-central part of the U.S. state of Georgia, traveling through the southern part of Columbia County and the northeastern part of Richmond County. It is named after John Brown Gordon, a Confederate general. At its western end, it is a relatively rural highway, but at its eastern end, it is an urban corridor of the Augusta metropolitan area. It connects Harlem and rural areas of southern Columbia County with Augusta and North Augusta, South Carolina. It also serves as the two main entry points to Fort Gordon. Its entire length, from the southeastern edge of Harlem to the Georgia–South Carolina state line on the northeastern edge of Augusta, is signed as part of US 78/US 278/SR 10. In Augusta, it is signed as parts of US 1 and US 25/SR 121.

== Route description ==
=== Columbia County ===
Gordon Highway begins as part of the concurrency of US 78/US 278/SR 10 on the southeastern edge of the city limits of Harlem in Columbia County, where the roadway continues into the city with the local name of Milledgeville Road. The highway travels through the unincorporated communities of Campania and Berzelia. A few thousand feet later, Gordon Highway curves to the northeast, entering into Richmond County (and the city limits of Augusta), and begins paralleling the northern edge of Fort Gordon.

=== Richmond County ===
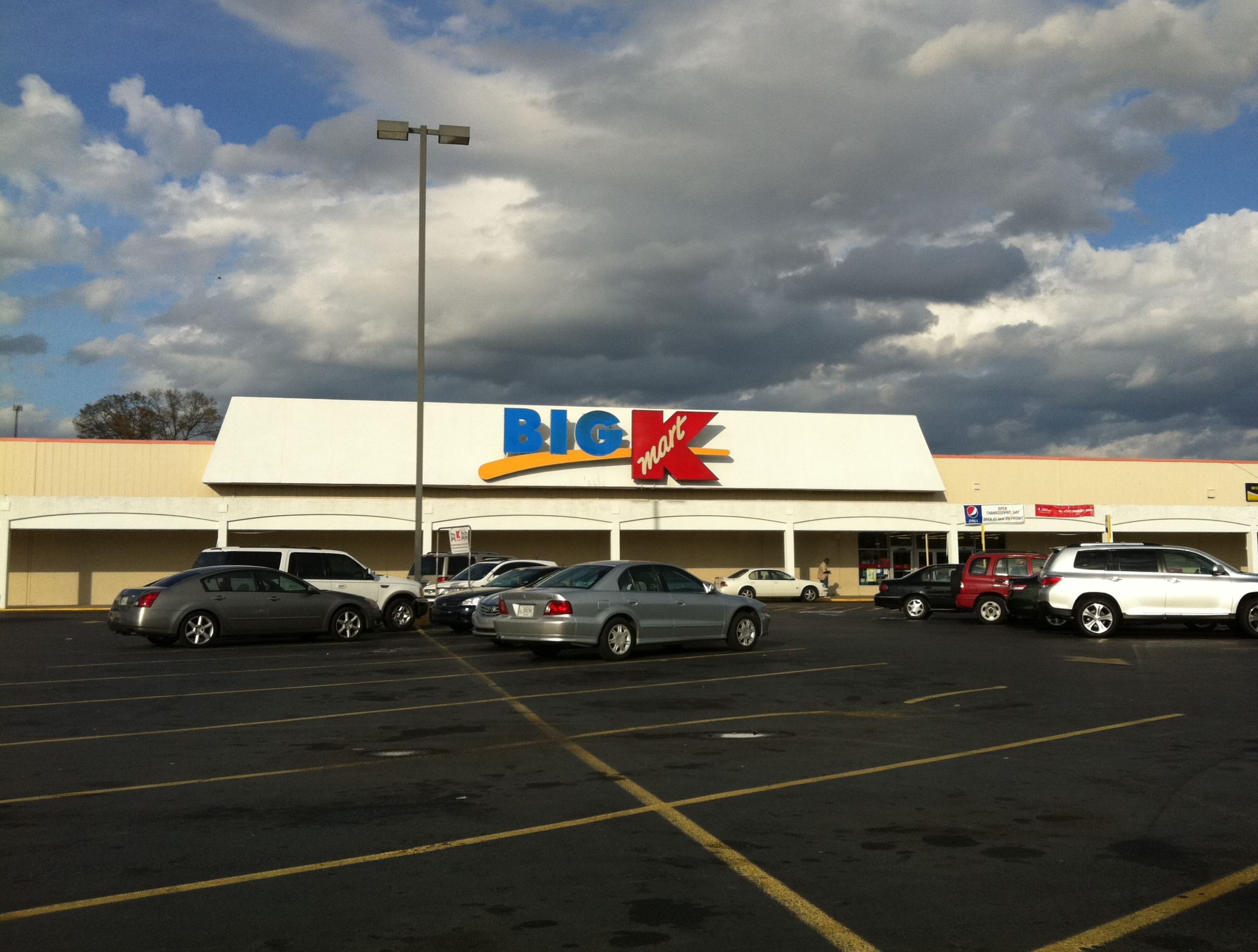
Former Kmart store on Gordon Highway

Gordon Highway serves as the access point for Augusta State Medical Prison. A short distance later is Fort Gordon's Gate 3, a commercial vehicle gate for the Army base. At the intersection with the eastern terminus of SR 223 (East Robinson Avenue), is an access road for Fort Gordon's Gate 2, a variable-hour gate. Approximately 3.4 miles (5.5 km) later is an intersection with the southern terminus of SR 383 (Jimmie Dyess Parkway) and the northern terminus of an access road to Fort Gordon's Gate 1, the 24-hour main gate for the base. About halfway between this intersection and the interchange with Interstate 520 (I-520; Bobby Jones Expressway), Gordon Highway leaves the edge of Fort Gordon and begins to transition into an urban corridor. After the interstate, the roadway enters the main part of Augusta, traveling south of Aquinas High School, and curves to the south-southeast, past the location of the now-closed Regency Mall. Immediately after a slight curve to the east is an intersection with US 1/SR 4 (Deans Bridge Road). At this intersection, US 1 joins the concurrency. Gordon Highway curves slightly to the east-southeast to an interchange with US 25/SR 121 (Peach Orchard Road), which both join the concurrency. The six highways take Gordon Highway to the east-northeast and intersect the northern terminus of Doug Barnard Parkway (former SR 56 Spur) and the southern terminus of Molly Pond Road. Gordon Highway curves to the north-northeast and intersects Laney Walker Boulevard, thus effectively entering downtown. It travels just to the northwest of Magnolia Cemetery, Cedar Grove Cemetery, and May Park and southeast of the James Brown Arena. A short distance later, they travel to the east of Old Medical College and the Old Government House, then have an interchange with US 25 Bus./SR 28 (Broad Street). Here, US 25 Bus. meets its southern terminus. Just after this interchange, the highway crosses over the Savannah River into South Carolina. At the state line, SR 10/Gordon Highway end, while US 1/US 25/US 78/US 278, concurrent with South Carolina Highway 121 (SC 121), travel on the Jefferson Davis Highway to the northeast toward North Augusta.

The entire length of Gordon Highway in Richmond County is part of the National Highway System, a system of roadways important to the nation's economy, defense, and mobility.

== History ==
Gordon Highway may have existed in 1955 when it was proposed in the 1950s stretching from Milldegeville Road to North Augusta, which made getting to Augusta faster. in 1957, it was extended to 5th Street; that year US 1/US 25/US 78/US 278/SR 10/SR 12/SR 21 were shifted there.

During the 1980s and 1990s, there were a widening project on Gordon Highway.

Following the protests after the murder of George Floyd, Augusta mayor Hardie Davis created the Task Force on Confederate Monuments, Street Names and Landmarks. The eleven member task force - consisting of local historians, educators, descendants of Confederate figures, and community activists - was charged with examining the renaming, relocating, or removal of places in Augusta that honor Confederate military figures.

The panel returned a final report to the Augusta Commission in October 2020 with a recommendation that the name of Gordon Highway be renamed.

Since the final report has been submitted, no action has been taken on the issue.

== Major intersections ==
County	Location	mi	km	Destinations	Notes
Columbia	Harlem	0.0	0.0	US 78 west / US 278 west / SR 10 west (Milledgeville Road) – Thomson	Western terminus; western end of US 78/US 278/SR 10 concurrency
Richmond	Augusta	8.1	13.0	SR 223 west (East Robinson Avenue) – Grovetown	Eastern terminus of SR 223; northern terminus of access road to Fort Gordon's Gate 2
Richmond	Augusta	11.5	18.5	SR 383 north (Jimmie Dyess Parkway) to I-20 – Fort Gordon, Intercity bus station, United States Army Signal Corps Museum	Southern terminus of SR 383; northern terminus of access road to Fort Gordon's Gate 1
Richmond	Augusta	14.0	22.5	I-520 (Bobby Jones Expressway / SR 415) to I-20 – Columbia, Atlanta, Bush Field	I-520 exit 3; Deputy James D. Paugh Memorial Interchange
Richmond	Augusta	17.6	28.3	US 1 south / SR 4 (Deans Bridge Road) – Wrens, Louisville, Augusta	Western end of US 1 concurrency
Richmond	Augusta	18.6	29.9	US 25 south / SR 121 south (Peach Orchard Road)	Western end of US 25/SR 121 concurrency; interchange
Richmond	Augusta	20.1	32.3	Doug Barnard Parkway south / Molly Pond Road north – Augusta Regional Airport, Phinizy Swamp Nature Park	Southern terminus of Molly Pond Road; northern terminus of Doug Barnard Parkway; former SR 56 Spur south
Richmond	Augusta	22.6	36.4	US 25 Bus. north / SR 28 (Broad Street)	Interchange; southern terminus of US 25 Bus.; also serves Bay Street; eastbound lanes have access via Bay Street.
Richmond	Augusta	22.8	36.7	US 1 north / US 25 north / US 78 east / US 278 east / SC 121 north (Jefferson Davis Highway north) / SR 10 ends – North Augusta	Eastern terminus of SR 10/Gordon Highway; southern terminus of Jefferson Davis Highway; eastern end of US 78/US 278/SR 10, US 1, and US 25/SR 121 concurrencies; crossing of the Savannah River; SR 121 continues as SC 121 at the state line
1.000 mi = 1.609 km; 1.000 km = 0.621 mi: Concurrency terminus

== See also ==
- Wrightsboro Road
- Transportation in Augusta, Georgia
