= Georgia State Route 28 =

State highway in northeastern and east-central Georgia

State Route 28
- SR 28 highlighted in red

Route information
- Maintained by GDOT
- Length: 25.7 mi (41.4 km)
- Existed: 1937–present

Southern section
- Length: 17.8 mi (28.6 km)
- West end: SC 28 at the South Carolina state line over the Savannah River northwest of Martinez
- Major intersections: SR 104 in Augusta; SR 104 Conn. in Augusta; I-20 in Augusta; US 1 / US 25 / US 25 Bus. / US 78 / US 278 / SR 10 / SR 121 in Augusta; I-520 in Augusta
- East end: SC 28 at the South Carolina state line over the Savannah River at Augusta

Northern section
- Length: 7.9 mi (12.7 km)
- South end: SC 28 at the South Carolina state line over the Chattooga River
- North end: NC 28 at the North Carolina state line north of Satolah

Location
- Country: United States
- State: Georgia
- Counties: Rabun, Columbia, Richmond

Highway system
- Georgia State Highway System; Interstate; US; State; Special
← SR 27S	→ US 29

State Route 28 (SR 28) is a 25.7-mile-long (41.4 km) state highway in the U.S. state of Georgia. It exists in two distinct segments separated by the northern segment of South Carolina Highway 28 (SC 28), which connects the two segments. The southern segment is entirely within the Augusta metropolitan area. The northern segment is located in the northeastern corner of the Chattooga River District of the Chattahoochee–Oconee National Forest. SR 28 consists of Georgia's segments of a multi-state Route 28 that includes two segments of SC 28 and one segment of North Carolina Highway 28 (NC 28). The northern segment is a south-to-north highway and the roadway it uses is unnamed. However, the southern segment is a west-to-east highway, and the roads it uses are known as Furys Ferry Road from the Furys Ferry Bridge at the South Carolina state line to the intersection with SR 104 Conn. in Augusta, Washington Road in the northern part of Augusta, John C. Calhoun Expressway, Greene Street, 5th Street, and Broad Street in downtown Augusta, and Sand Bar Ferry Road in the northeastern part of Augusta.

The southern segment was formerly SR 52. The northern segment was formerly SR 65 until 1932 and then SR 105 until 1937. In 1937, both SR 105 and SR 52 were redesignated as SR 28. It also used the entire length of Broad Street until after the completion of the John C. Calhoun Expressway. The portion of SR 28 between 15th Street and 13th Street was proposed as SR 736 before the John C. Calhoun Expressway was extended along SR 736's path, and SR 28 was shifted onto it.

== Route description ==
=== Southern segment ===
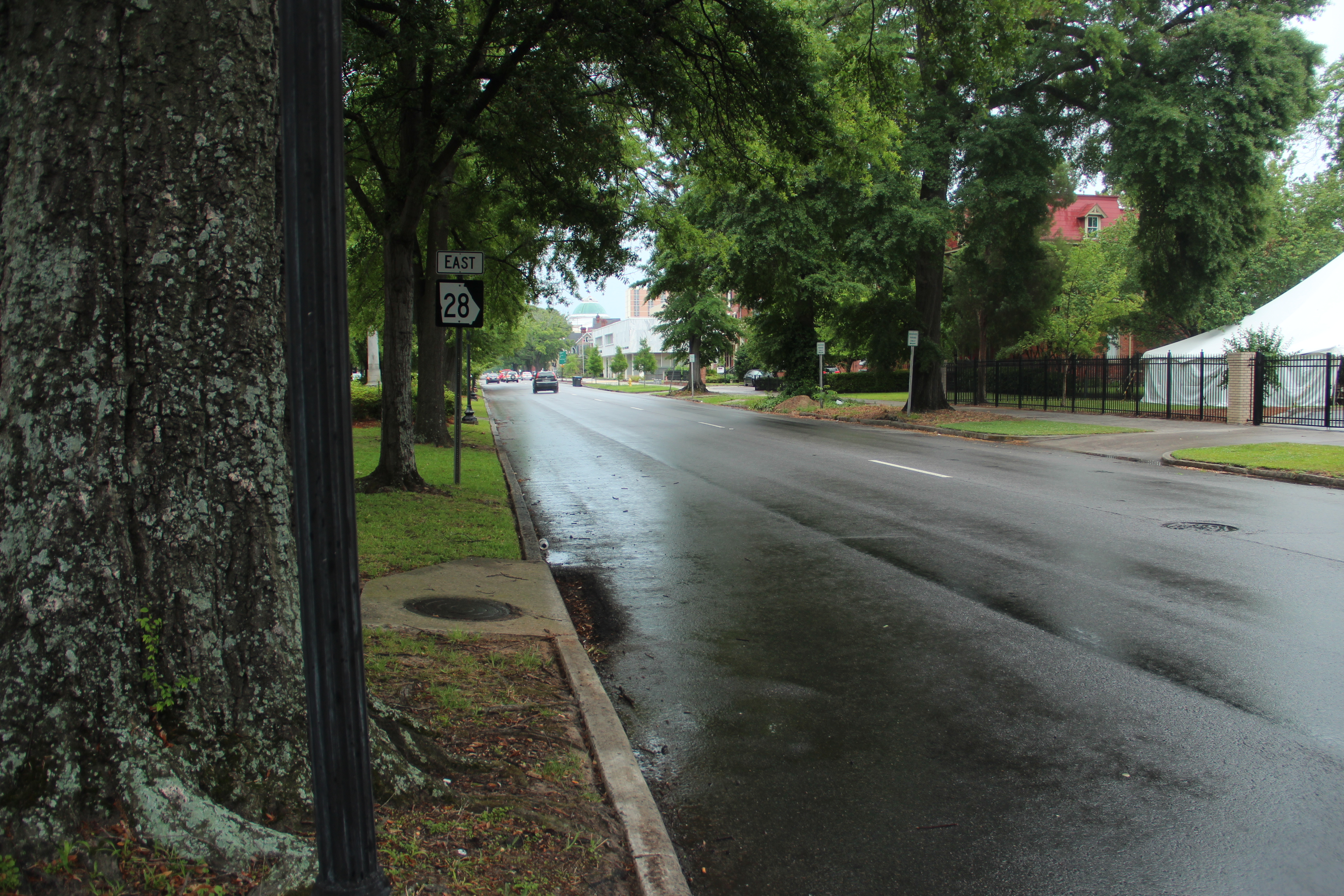
Georgia State Route 28 (Greene Street) in Augusta

SR 28's southern segment begins where SC 28 meets the state line on the Furys Ferry Bridge as a two-lane road, northwest of Martinez in Columbia County. About a 1 mile (1.6 km) later, it meets an roundabout intersection with the northern terminus of Hardy McManus Road. At the roundabout, SR 28 widens into a four-lane divided highway. Soon, just by Riverside Middle School, it meets an intersection with the northern terminus of North Belair Road, which goes towards the southern beginning of SR 383 in Evans. At this intersection, it also meets southern terminus of Mullikin Road, which provides access to neighborhoods and River Ridge Elementary. SR 28 curves to the southeast and it meets an seagull intersection with the eastern terminus of Southern Pines Drive, as it passes Jones Creek Golf Course. It later meets an intersection with the eastern terminus of Colony Drive (links to Colony Square) and the western terminus of Blackstone Camp Road. The roadway later meets its next intersection with Evans-To-Locks Road. After meeting Evans-To-Locks Road, SR 28 enters Martinez. There, SR 28 passes by West Lake Country Club and continues to the southeast. After that, it enters Richmond County and the city limits of Augusta. Approximately 1,000 feet (300 m) after an intersection with SR 104 (Riverwatch Parkway) is an intersection with the eastern terminus of SR 104 Conn. (Washington Road). Here, SR 28 takes on the Washington Road name. Just under 1 mile (1.6 km) later, is an interchange with Interstate 20 (I-20; Carl Sanders Highway). Then, it curves to the east-southeast. It skirts along the northeastern part of Augusta National Golf Club, where the Masters Tournament is held every spring. After that, SR 28 curves to the south-southeast. At a partial interchange with the western terminus of Broad Street, the Washington Road name ends and the John C. Calhoun Expressway designation begins. The expressway skirts along the southwestern and southern edges of Lake Olmstead. It travels under Milledge Road and has a split diamond interchange with Eve Street and Crawford Avenue. A few hundred feet later, it has a half diamond interchange with 15th Street. The roadway then travels over St. Sebastian Way. After crossing over the Augusta Canal and SR 4 (13th Street), the expressway ends at 12th Street, and SR 28 becomes known as Greene Street. It turns left onto 5th Street and then meets US 25 Bus. (Broad Street). US 25 Bus./SR 28 travel to the southeast on Broad Street. At an interchange with US 1/US 25/US 78/US 278/SR 10/SR 121 (Gordon Highway), US 25 Bus. ends, and SR 28 continues through the Olde Town section of the city. During a slight southerly jog, the local street name transitions to Sand Bar Ferry Road. SR 28 travels to the southeast and has an interchange with I-520 (Bobby Jones Expressway) and Laney Walker Boulevard. It curves to the south-southeast and intersects the eastern terminus of Laney Walker Boulevard Extension; then, the road curves to the east and again meets the South Carolina state line, where the road crosses over the Savannah River on the Sand Bar Ferry Bridge and continues, again as the southern segment of SC 28, and retains the Sand Bar Ferry Road name.

=== Northern segment ===
The northern segment of SR 28 is a 7.9-mile-long (12.7 km) highway entirely located in Rabun County. It begins at the South Carolina state line, where the roadway crosses over the Chattooga River on the Russell Bridge into that state. It immediately enters the Chattooga River District of the Chattahoochee–Oconee National Forest in the southeastern part of Rabun County. It heads to the northwest. After a curve to the north-northwest, it begins to parallel West Fork Spring. It curves to the north-northeast, leaves the creek, and enters Pine Mountain. There, it curves to the west-southwest and meets the western terminus of Warwoman Road, which leads to Clayton. It curves back to the north-northeast and generally parallels Low Ground Creek. The highway crosses over the creek and then curves back to the north-northwest. At the western terminus of Firehouse Lane, it passes the Satolah Volunteer Fire Department. It crosses over Old Camp Branch and curves back to the north-northeast. It curves back to the north-northwest and begins paralleling Little Creek. It curves to the northwest and crosses over Big Creek. It curves back to the north-northwest and crosses over Talley Mill Creek and travels through Satolah. The highway continues winding its way to the North Carolina state line. Here, the roadway becomes NC 28.

=== National Highway System ===
The following portion of SR 28's southern segment are part of the National Highway System (NHS), a system of routes determined to be the most important for the nation's economy, mobility, and defense:

- From the intersection with SR 104 to the Sand Bar Ferry Bridge at South Carolina state line.

No part of the northern segment is part of the NHS.

=== Milepost numbering ===
The entire southern segment of SR 28's milepost numbering increases westward instead of eastward inversely, due to a use of a south-to-north numbering instead of the usual west-to-east system.

== History ==
=== 1920s and 1930s ===
The roadway that would eventually become SR 28 was established as SR 65 from the North Carolina state line, north-northwest of Pine Mountain, to the South Carolina state line, south-southeast of it. Also, SR 52 was established from the South Carolina state line, northwest of Augusta, to another point on the state line, south-southeast of the city. Between November 1930 and January 1932, the entire length of SR 52 had a "completed hard surface". Between May and August 1932, SR 65 was redesignated as SR 105. Between October 1937 and January 1938, SR 105 was redesignated as the northern segment of SR 28, while SR 52 was redesignated as the southern segment. At this time, SR 28 and SR 104 traveled concurrently on Broad Street from the northern part of Augusta to the US 25/SR 21 (13th Street) intersection, where SR 104 reached its eastern terminus. US 25/SR 21/SR 28 was indicated to travel southeast on Broad Street to the US 1/US 25/US 78/SR 4/SR 10/SR 12/SR 21 (7th Street) intersection, where US 25/SR 21 departed and US 1/US 78/SR 4/SR 10/SR 12 joined. The six highways were indicated to travel southeast on Broad Street for two blocks to 5th Street, where SR 28 continued as before. Between September 1938 and July 1939, the entire length of the northern segment had a completed hard surface.

=== 1940s to 1960s ===
Between January 1945 and November 1946, SR 104 was truncated off of SR 28 to the Columbia–Richmond county line. Between June 1954 and June 1955, US 1/US 78/SR 4/SR 10/SR 12 was shifted off of SR 28 to travel on 5th Street. By July 1957, the east end of the US 25 concurrency was shifted from 7th Street to 5th Street. Between June 1960 and June 1963, US 25 was shifted off of SR 28 to travel concurrently with US 1/US 78/US 278/SR 4/SR 10. The former path, partially on SR 28, was redesignated as US 25 Bus. Between the beginning of 1957 and the beginning of 1966, an unnumbered road was proposed from SR 28 (Broad Street) just south of Lake Olmstead south-southeast, east-southeast, and southeast to Walton Way just west-northwest of 13th Street. Between June 1963 and January 1966, the interchange with US 1/US 25/US 78/US 278/SR 10/SR 121 (Gordon Highway) was built.

=== 1960s to 1980s ===
Between the beginning of 1966 and the beginning of 1973, the unnumbered road in Augusta was extended southeast to Gwinnett Street at Gordon Highway. In 1976, Washington Road was extended on the previously unnumbered road from SR 28 to 15th Street, paralleling SR 28 for its entire length. In 1980, this extension was renamed as John C. Calhoun Expressway. The next year, SR 21 was truncated out of the Augusta area, and SR 4 was rerouted in the city, onto 13th Street. Thus, both highways no longer traveled concurrent with US 25 Bus./SR 28. In 1982, SR 736 was proposed to connect the eastern terminus of the John C. Calhoun Expressway, at 15th Street, with the western terminus of Greene Street, at SR 4 (13th Street). In 1985, SR 28 was shifted southwest, off of Broad Street northwest of 5th Street, and onto John C. Calhoun Expressway, the proposed path of SR 736, and Greene Street.

=== 2020s to present ===
Between 2021 and 2026, SR 28 (Furys Ferry Rd) was going through an 4-mile (6.4 km) widening project. It started with the Furys Ferry Bridge at the South Carolina state line all the way to Evans-to-Locks Road. From the state line to Hardy McManus Road, it will be widened into a two-lane road with a center lane, turning lanes, bicycle lanes, and sidewalks. From Hardy McManus Road to Evans-to-Locks Road, the road will be widened into a four-lane road with median, turning lanes, bicycle lanes, and sidewalks. The project included a new multi-lane roundabout at the Furys Ferry Road and Hardy McManus Road intersection. This project costed about $50 million. The Furys Ferry Rd widening project construction had begun in early August 2021 and was completed in end of October 2026.

== Major intersections ==
All exits are unnumbered.

County	Location	mi	km	Destinations	Notes
Savannah River		17.8	28.6	SC 28 east (Sand Bar Ferry Road east) – Beech Island	Continuation into South Carolina; SC 28 takes on the Sand Bar Ferry Road name.
Savannah River		17.8	28.6	Sand Bar Ferry Bridge	
Richmond	Augusta	16.3– 16.1	26.2– 25.9	I-520 (Bobby Jones Expressway / SR 415)	I-520/SR 415 exit 16
Richmond	Augusta	14.2– 14.1	22.9– 22.7	US 1 / US 25 / US 78 / US 278 (Gordon Highway / SR 10 / SR 121) / US 25 Bus. begins – Columbia, Louisville, Waynesboro	Eastern end of US 25 Bus. concurrency; southern terminus of US 25 Bus.; interchange; westbound traffic has to make a u-turn for access to Gordon Highway.
Richmond	Augusta	14.1	22.7	Broad Street west (US 25 Bus. north)	Western end of US 25 Bus. concurrency; serves Augusta University Medical Center
Richmond	Augusta	13.1	21.1	Eastern end of John C. Calhoun Expressway portion	
Richmond	Augusta	13.1	21.1	Greene Street west to I-20 (SR 402)	Westbound exit only; interchange
Richmond	Augusta	12.2	19.6	15th Street	Eastbound exit and westbound entrance; exit signed as “Fifteenth Street”; half diamond interchange
Richmond	Augusta	12.0– 11.3	19.3– 18.2	Eve Street / Crawford Avenue	Split diamond interchange
Richmond	Augusta	10.5	16.9	Broad Street	Eastbound exit and westbound entrance; interchange; also serves Morningside Drive and Lakemont Drive
Richmond	Augusta	10.5	16.9	Western end of John C. Calhoun Expressway portion	
Richmond	Augusta	8.0– 7.9	12.9– 12.7	I-20 (Carl Sanders Highway / SR 402) to SR 104 east – Atlanta, Columbia	I-20/SR 402 exit 199
Richmond	Augusta	7.0	11.3	SR 104 Conn. west (Washington Road west)	Eastern terminus of SR 104 Conn., which takes on the Washington Road name
Richmond	Augusta	6.7	10.8	SR 104 (Riverwatch Parkway) to I-20 (SR 402) – Brookfield Park, Augusta, Martinez	
Savannah River		0.00	0.00	Furys Ferry Bridge	
Savannah River		0.00	0.00	SC 28 west – Clarks Hill	Continuation into South Carolina
SC 28 travels through South Carolina
Chattooga River		0.00	0.00	SC 28 east (Highlands Highway) – Walhalla	Continuation into South Carolina
Chattooga River		0.00	0.00	Russell Bridge	
Rabun		7.9	12.7	NC 28 north (Walhalla Road) – Highlands	Continuation into North Carolina
1.000 mi = 1.609 km; 1.000 km = 0.621 mi: Concurrency terminus; Incomplete access
