= Childers Creek =

Stream in Georgia, U.S.

Coordinates: 33°31′19″N 82°36′08″W

Childers Creek is a stream in the U.S. state of Georgia. It is a tributary to Middle Creek.

Childers Creek has the name of a pioneer citizen.
