= Mattox Creek (Georgia) =

- Location within Georgia Location within the United States

Physical characteristics
- Source
  - coordinates: 33.4604152°N 82.5845759°W
- Mouth
  - coordinates: 33.5656891°N 82.5365194°W

Mattox Creek is a stream in the U.S. state of Georgia.

Mattox Creek was named after Joseph Maddox, a pioneer settler. Variant names are "Maddocks Creek" and "Maddox Creek".
