= Martinez, Georgia =

- Unincorporated community Census-designated place
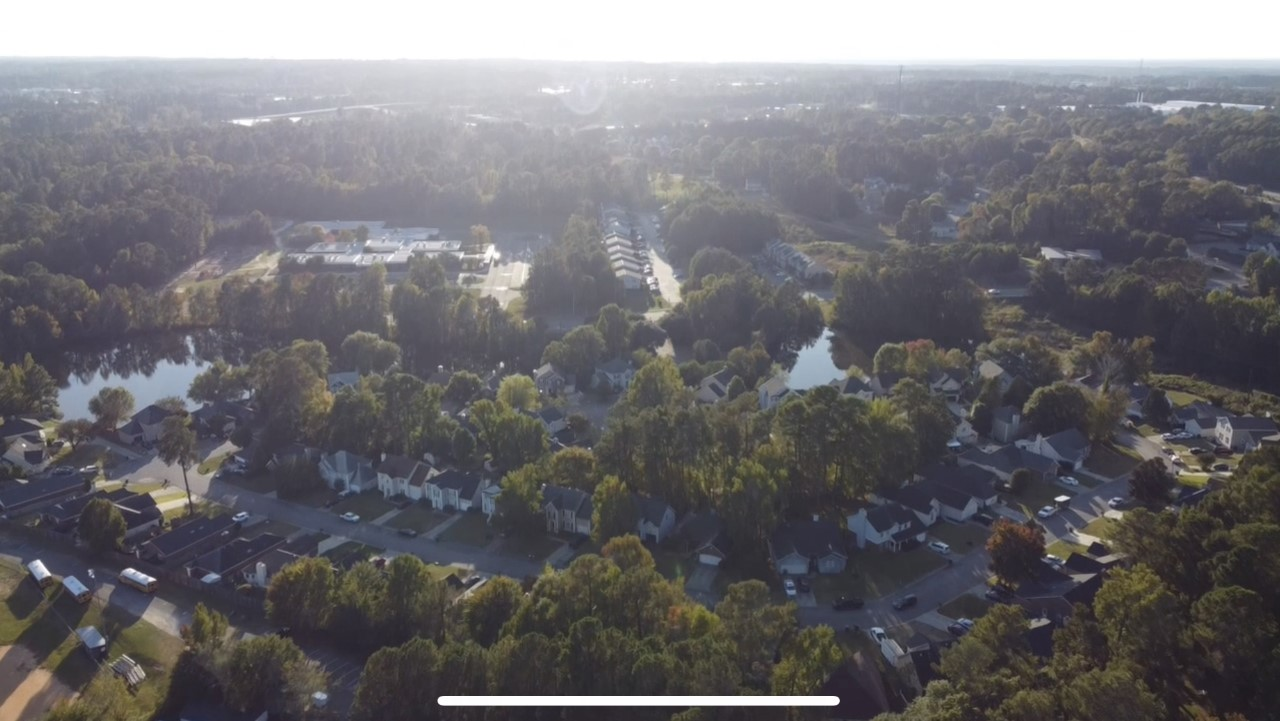
- Neighborhood in Martinez

- Location in Columbia County and the state of Georgia
- Coordinates: 33°30′58″N 82°6′0″W
- Country: United States
- State: Georgia
- County: Columbia

Area
  - Total: 14.62 sq mi (37.86 km^{2})
  - Land: 14.51 sq mi (37.57 km^{2})
  - Water: 0.11 sq mi (0.29 km^{2})
- Elevation: 360 ft (110 m)

Population (2020)
  - Total: 34,535
  - Density: 2,380.8/sq mi (919.22/km^{2})
- Time zone: UTC-5 (Eastern (EST))
  - Summer (DST): UTC-4 (EDT)
- ZIP code: 30907
- Area code: 706
- FIPS code: 13-50036
- GNIS feature ID: 0332326

Martinez (/ˌmɑːrtɪˈnɛz/ MARTIN-EZ) is an unincorporated community and census-designated place (CDP) in Columbia County, Georgia, United States. It is a northwestern suburb of Augusta and is part of the Augusta, Georgia metropolitan area. The population was 34,535 at the 2020 census.

== Geography ==
Martinez is located in eastern Columbia County at 33°30′58″N 82°6′0″W (33.516089, -82.100024). It is bordered to the southeast by the city of Augusta in Richmond County. To the north and northwest is the CDP of Evans. Interstate 20 forms the short southern boundary of Martinez, with access from Exits 194 (Georgia State Route 383/South Belair Road) and 195 (Wheeler Road).

According to the United States Census Bureau, the CDP has a total area of 14.6 square miles (37.9 km^{2}), of which 14.5 square miles (37.6 km^{2}) is land and 0.12 square miles (0.3 km^{2}), or 0.76%, is water.

Martinez has an elevation of 361 feet (110 m) above sea level, about 200 feet (61 m) higher than downtown Augusta. The areas of the CDP closest to the Richmond County line tend to be relatively flat, while land further west is hillier. Trees in Martinez are seen mainly in the subdivisions, as the main roads are crowded with businesses. They include pine, oak, sweet gum, hickory, and a variety of other species.

== History ==
The founder was Jose Antonio Martinez y Zaldivar, a wealthy man from Camagüey Cuba. He bought land in Columbia County in 1869 and named it El Cordero Ranch; Cordero means Lamb.

On November 5, 1876, Marie Martinez married Mr. George Perrin at Sacred Heart Catholic Church in Augusta, Georgia. The 1880 US Census indicates George was a druggist and was 29 years old. Marie was 22, and they resided on Broad Street #1109. The couple had one son, Thomas Wright Perrin, born on August 23, 1885. El Cordero Ranch is now only 20 acres in size. His old hacienda and several buildings, barns and a water tower still stand off Old Ferry Road in Martinez (near the intersection of River Watch Parkway and Baston Road).

== Demographics ==
Historical population
Census	Pop.	Note	%±
1980	16,472		—
1990	29,877		81.4%
2000	27,749		−7.1%
2010	35,795		29.0%
2020	34,535		−3.5%
U.S. Decennial Census; 1850-1870 1870-1880; 1890-1910 1920-1930; 1940 1950 1960; 1970 1980 1990; 2000 2010 2020

Martinez was first listed as a CDP in the 1980 United States census.

=== Racial and ethnic composition ===
Martinez, Georgia – Racial and ethnic composition Note: the US Census treats Hispanic/Latino as an ethnic category. This table excludes Latinos from the racial categories and assigns them to a separate category. Hispanics/Latinos may be of any race.
Race / Ethnicity (NH = Non-Hispanic)	Pop 2000	Pop 2010	Pop 2020	% 2000	% 2010	% 2020
White alone (NH)	22,883	26,740	23,058	82.46%	74.70%	66.77%
Black or African American alone (NH)	2,196	4,464	4,770	7.91%	12.47%	13.81%
Native American or Alaska Native alone (NH)	63	103	76	0.23%	0.29%	0.22%
Asian alone (NH)	1,554	1,961	2,186	5.60%	5.48%	6.33%
Pacific Islander alone (NH)	19	80	86	0.07%	0.22%	0.25%
Some Other Race alone (NH)	48	70	191	0.17%	0.20%	0.55%
Mixed race or Multiracial (NH)	346	847	1,883	1.25%	2.37%	5.45%
Hispanic or Latino (any race)	640	1,530	2,285	2.31%	4.27%	6.62%
Total	27,749	35,795	34,535	100.00%	100.00%	100.00%

=== 2020 census ===
As of the 2020 census, Martinez had a population of 34,535 and 8,153 families residing in the CDP.

The median age was 38.6 years. 23.5% of residents were under the age of 18 and 17.4% of residents were 65 years of age or older. For every 100 females there were 93.9 males, and for every 100 females age 18 and over there were 90.6 males age 18 and over.

100.0% of residents lived in urban areas, while 0.0% lived in rural areas.

There were 13,418 households in Martinez, of which 32.8% had children under the age of 18 living in them. Of all households, 52.3% were married-couple households, 16.2% were households with a male householder and no spouse or partner present, and 26.5% were households with a female householder and no spouse or partner present. About 23.9% of all households were made up of individuals and 9.6% had someone living alone who was 65 years of age or older.

There were 14,154 housing units, of which 5.2% were vacant. The homeowner vacancy rate was 1.4% and the rental vacancy rate was 7.3%.

Racial composition as of the 2020 census
Race	Number	Percent
White	23,631	68.4%
Black or African American	4,882	14.1%
American Indian and Alaska Native	103	0.3%
Asian	2,204	6.4%
Native Hawaiian and Other Pacific Islander	86	0.2%
Some other race	780	2.3%
Two or more races	2,849	8.2%
Hispanic or Latino (of any race)	2,285	6.6%

== Schools ==
The school district is Columbia County School System.

- Lakeside High School
- Evans High School
- Greenbrier High School
- Adventist Christian School
- Lakeside Middle School
- Riverside Middle School
- Columbia Middle School
- Greenbrier Middle School
- Evans Middle School
- Stallings Island Middle School
- Martinez Elementary School
- Blue Ridge Elementary School
- Westmont Elementary School
- South Columbia Elementary School
- Stevens Creek Elementary School

Private schools:

- Augusta Preparatory Day School
- Augusta Christian Schools

== Highways ==
- I-20
- SR 28
- SR 104
- SR 232
- SR 383
- SR 402

== See also ==
- Central Savannah River Area
