= Appling, Georgia =

- Unincorporated community Census-designated place
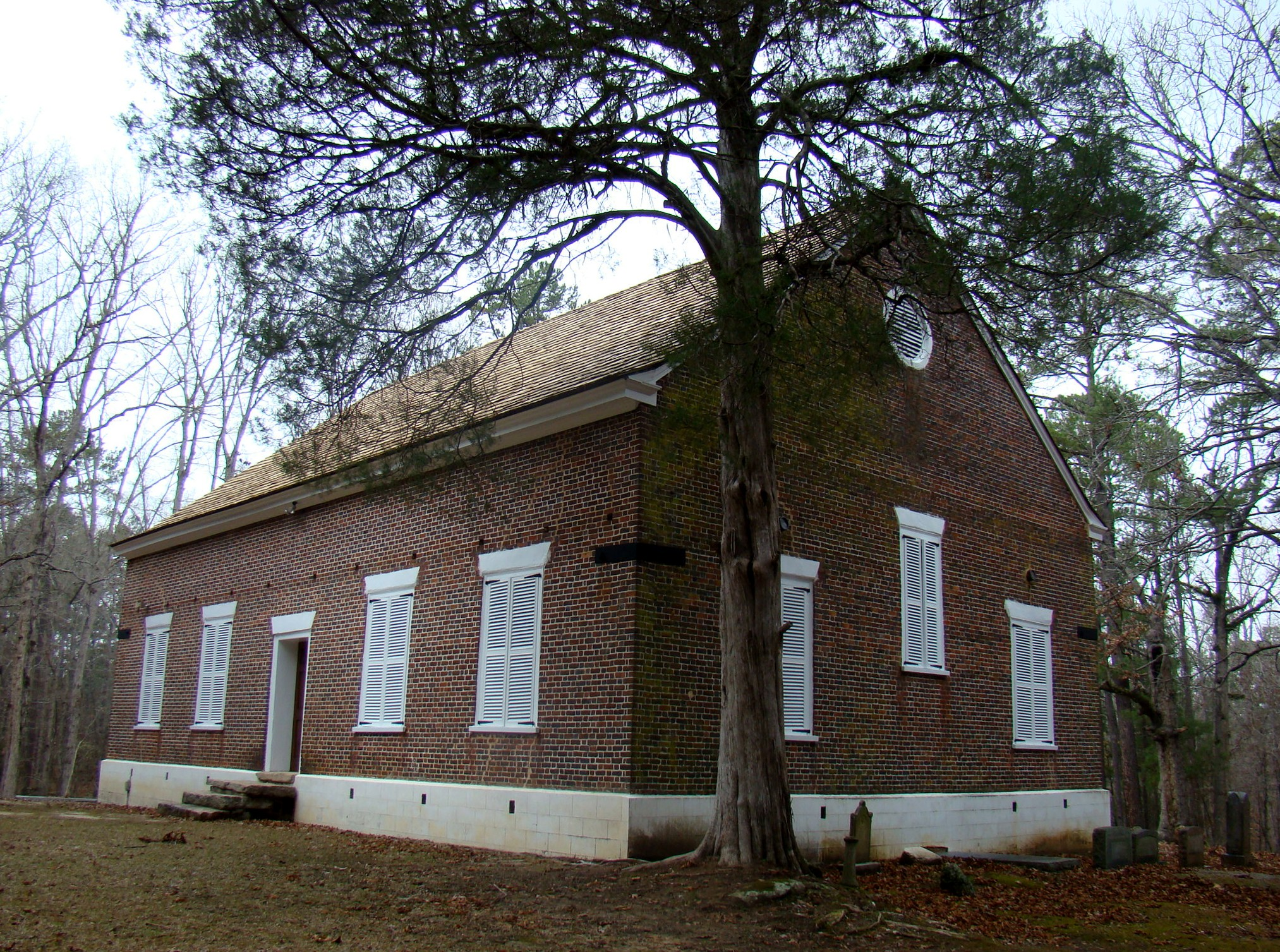
- Kiokee Baptist Church in Appling

- Location within the state of Georgia Appling (the United States)
- Coordinates: 33°32′45″N 82°18′57″W
- Country: United States
- State: Georgia
- County: Columbia

Area
  - Total: 8.83 sq mi (22.86 km^{2})
  - Land: 8.82 sq mi (22.84 km^{2})
  - Water: 0.0077 sq mi (0.02 km^{2})
- Elevation: 394 ft (120 m)

Population (2020)
  - Total: 658
  - Density: 74.6/sq mi (28.81/km^{2})
- Time zone: UTC-5 (Eastern (EST))
  - Summer (DST): UTC-4 (EDT)
- ZIP Code: 30802
- Area codes: 706 & 762
- GNIS ID: 2746617

Appling is an unincorporated community and census-designated place (CDP) in and the county seat of Columbia County, Georgia, United States. As of the 2020 census, its population is 658. It is part of the Augusta metropolitan area.

Appling was formerly a city but, with the 1993 passage of legislation requiring cities to provide at least three municipal services, Appling was not able to remain incorporated. It was one of 187 inactive cities in Georgia that lost its charter on 1 June 1995. There was question as to whether it had ever been incorporated at all since it had no functioning corporate authorities.

Columbia County government and judicial offices are in Evans with the Columbia County Government Center, the Government Complex Addition, and the Columbia County Courthouse Annex all located there. Appling retains its status as county seat but all governmental functions are carried out in Evans.

== Geography ==
Appling is located at 33°32′45″N 82°18′57″W.

Appling lies along U.S. Route 221 (Appling-Harlem Road) and is traversed by (Great) Kiokee Creek.

=== Climate ===
According to the Köppen Climate Classification system, Appling has a humid subtropical climate, abbreviated "Cfa" on climate maps. The hottest temperature recorded in Appling was 107 °F (41.7 °C) on July 1, 2012, while the coldest temperature recorded was −4 °F (−20.0 °C) on January 21, 1985.

Climate data for Appling, Georgia, 1991–2020 normals, extremes 1961–present
Month	Jan	Feb	Mar	Apr	May	Jun	Jul	Aug	Sep	Oct	Nov	Dec	Year
Record high °F (°C)	81 (27)	83 (28)	88 (31)	93 (34)	100 (38)	105 (41)	107 (42)	105 (41)	102 (39)	99 (37)	90 (32)	80 (27)	107 (42)
Mean maximum °F (°C)	72.0 (22.2)	75.3 (24.1)	82.0 (27.8)	86.1 (30.1)	90.8 (32.7)	95.2 (35.1)	97.6 (36.4)	96.6 (35.9)	92.9 (33.8)	86.1 (30.1)	79.5 (26.4)	73.3 (22.9)	98.7 (37.1)
Mean daily maximum °F (°C)	57.1 (13.9)	60.9 (16.1)	68.5 (20.3)	76.3 (24.6)	82.9 (28.3)	88.4 (31.3)	91.5 (33.1)	90.0 (32.2)	85.6 (29.8)	77.0 (25.0)	67.2 (19.6)	59.4 (15.2)	75.4 (24.1)
Daily mean °F (°C)	44.8 (7.1)	48.2 (9.0)	54.9 (12.7)	62.6 (17.0)	70.3 (21.3)	77.5 (25.3)	80.9 (27.2)	79.6 (26.4)	74.2 (23.4)	64.0 (17.8)	53.5 (11.9)	47.1 (8.4)	63.1 (17.3)
Mean daily minimum °F (°C)	32.4 (0.2)	35.5 (1.9)	41.3 (5.2)	48.8 (9.3)	57.7 (14.3)	66.6 (19.2)	70.2 (21.2)	69.1 (20.6)	62.7 (17.1)	51.0 (10.6)	39.7 (4.3)	34.7 (1.5)	50.8 (10.5)
Mean minimum °F (°C)	16.8 (−8.4)	20.7 (−6.3)	24.5 (−4.2)	33.3 (0.7)	44.1 (6.7)	56.7 (13.7)	62.1 (16.7)	60.2 (15.7)	49.6 (9.8)	34.1 (1.2)	25.2 (−3.8)	20.2 (−6.6)	14.8 (−9.6)
Record low °F (°C)	−4 (−20)	6 (−14)	6 (−14)	22 (−6)	32 (0)	40 (4)	52 (11)	52 (11)	32 (0)	25 (−4)	13 (−11)	1 (−17)	−4 (−20)
Average precipitation inches (mm)	4.35 (110)	3.85 (98)	4.89 (124)	3.06 (78)	3.26 (83)	4.84 (123)	3.79 (96)	4.21 (107)	3.68 (93)	2.88 (73)	3.31 (84)	4.13 (105)	46.25 (1,174)
Average precipitation days (≥ 0.01 in)	6.0	5.4	5.6	5.1	5.0	7.2	6.8	6.9	4.9	3.7	4.2	5.8	66.6
Source 1: NOAA
Source 2: National Weather Service

== History ==
Appling was known as Columbia Courthouse when it received its original town charter in 1816. The town was renamed for local resident Colonel Daniel Appling, a decorated soldier in the War of 1812, after he died in 1817.

In the early 19th century, Appling was the political, educational, social, and religious center of Columbia County and home to nearby schools Carmel Academy and Columbia Institute. Carmel Academy was founded by the famous Southern educator Moses Waddel and attended by John C. Calhoun and William H. Crawford. Columbia Institute was founded by Connecticut-born David Bushnell, inventor of the first naval wartime submarine, who moved to the area after serving in the American Revolutionary War.

In the 1830s, when the Georgia Railroad was established, it was decided that having a train pass through Appling would disturb the proceedings of the court, so the railway from Atlanta to Augusta was built to the south of Appling.

In 1855, the courthouse in Appling received a major overhaul, and after the remodeling was complete in 1856, the building was in more or less its present form, a vernacular structure with Greek Revival and Italianate influences. Despite the extensive project, the shell of the 1809–1812 building was retained and the structure has been listed on the National Register of Historic Places since 1980.

Appling was nearly destroyed by a tornado in the 1870s, and it never regained the prestige it had prior to the tornado and the Civil War. Although there was an effort to organize the municipality in the early 20th century, the corporation remained inactive. Appling lost its charter in 1995.

== Demographics ==
Historical population
Census	Pop.	Note	%±
2020	658		—
U.S. Decennial Census; 1850-1870 1870-1880; 1890-1910 1920-1930; 1940 1950 1960; 1970 1980 1990; 2000 2020

Appling was first listed as a census designated place in the 2020 U.S. census.

Appling CDP, Georgia – Racial and ethnic composition Note: the US Census treats Hispanic/Latino as an ethnic category. This table excludes Latinos from the racial categories and assigns them to a separate category. Hispanics/Latinos may be of any race.
Race / Ethnicity (NH = Non-Hispanic)	Pop 2020	% 2020
White alone (NH)	553	84.04%
Black or African American alone (NH)	30	4.56%
Native American or Alaska Native alone (NH)	8	1.22%
Asian alone (NH)	3	0.46%
Pacific Islander alone (NH)	0	0.00%
Other race alone (NH)	0	0.00%
Mixed race or Multiracial (NH)	46	6.99%
Hispanic or Latino (any race)	18	2.74%
Total	658	100.00%

As of the 2020 United States census, there were 658 people, 311 households, and 145 families residing in the CDP.

== See also ==
- Central Savannah River Area
- Professional Disc Golf Association
- Lake Strom Thurmond
