= Harlem, Georgia =

Harlem
- City
- Interactive map of Harlem
- Coordinates: 33°25′1″N 82°18′50″W
- Country: United States
- State: Georgia
- County: Columbia, McDuffie

Area
  - Total: 6.61 sq mi (17.11 km^{2})
  - Land: 6.59 sq mi (17.06 km^{2})
  - Water: 0.015 sq mi (0.04 km^{2})
- Elevation: 554 ft (169 m)

Population (2020)
  - Total: 3,571
  - Density: 542.0/sq mi (209.28/km^{2})
- Time zone: UTC-5 (EST)
  - Summer (DST): UTC-4 (EDT)
- ZIP code: 30814
- Area code: 706
- FIPS code: 13-36696
- GNIS feature ID: 0331913
- Website: harlemga.org

Harlem is a city in Columbia and McDuffie counties, in the U.S. state of Georgia. It is part of the Augusta metropolitan area. As of the 2020 census, Harlem had a population of 3,571. This city was named after the neighborhood in the borough of Manhattan. Harlem is the birthplace of comedian Oliver Hardy; the annual Harlem Oliver Hardy Festival is held on the first Saturday each October on Main Street in his honor.

== History ==
From the building of the Georgia Railroad which passes through town until at least the 1860s, Harlem was known as Saw Dust. The town is twinned with Ulverston in England, the birthplace of Stan Laurel, comedy partner of Oliver Hardy.

== Geography ==
Harlem is located primarily in southern Columbia County at 33°25′1″N 82°18′50″W (33.416822, -82.313762), with its western boundary following the McDuffie County line. U.S. Routes 78 and 278 pass through the center of town, leading east 23 miles (37 km) to downtown Augusta and west 12 miles (19 km) to Thomson. U.S. Route 221 crosses US 78/278 in the center of town, leading north 5 miles (8 km) to Interstate 20 and 21 miles (34 km) to the South Carolina border, and south 16 miles (26 km) to Wrens.

According to the United States Census Bureau, Harlem has a total area of 4.5 square miles (11.7 km^{2}), of which 0.02 square miles (0.04 km^{2}), or 0.36%, is water.

=== Neighborhoods ===
- Sawdust (33°25′09″N 82°19′55″W, area code: 706 & 762) is a neighborhood in the city (formerly a separate unincorporated community); along the Columbia–McDuffie county line. U.S. Routes 78 and 278, 1 mile (1.6 km) west of the center of Harlem and 3 miles (5 km) east of Dearing. It was so named on account of there being several sawmills near the original town site. The name sometimes is spelled out as "Saw Dust". A post office called Saw Dust was established in 1852, and remained in operation until 1895.

== Demographics ==
Historical population
Census	Pop.	Note	%±
1880	292		—
1890	647		121.6%
1900	527		−18.5%
1910	736		39.7%
1920	798		8.4%
1930	784		−1.8%
1940	736		−6.1%
1950	1,033		40.4%
1960	1,423		37.8%
1970	1,540		8.2%
1980	1,485		−3.6%
1990	2,199		48.1%
2000	1,814		−17.5%
2010	2,666		47.0%
2020	3,571		33.9%
U.S. Decennial Census

=== 2020 census ===
As of the 2020 census, Harlem had a population of 3,571. The median age was 33.4 years. 28.1% of residents were under the age of 18 and 13.8% of residents were 65 years of age or older. For every 100 females there were 86.5 males, and for every 100 females age 18 and over there were 83.3 males age 18 and over.

0.0% of residents lived in urban areas, while 100.0% lived in rural areas.

There were 1,318 households in Harlem, of which 42.9% had children under the age of 18 living in them. Of all households, 50.2% were married-couple households, 15.6% were households with a male householder and no spouse or partner present, and 29.8% were households with a female householder and no spouse or partner present. About 22.7% of all households were made up of individuals and 10.2% had someone living alone who was 65 years of age or older. There were 645 families residing in the city.

There were 1,419 housing units, of which 7.1% were vacant. The homeowner vacancy rate was 2.5% and the rental vacancy rate was 5.9%.

Harlem racial composition as of 2020
Race	Num.	Perc.
White (non-Hispanic)	2,408	67.43%
Black or African American (non-Hispanic)	754	21.11%
Native American	12	0.34%
Asian	24	0.67%
Pacific Islander	11	0.31%
Other/Mixed	198	5.54%
Hispanic or Latino	164	4.59%

== Culture and Institutions ==
=== Laurel and Hardy Museum ===
The Harlem Museum and Welcome Center, also known as the Laurel and Hardy Museum, preserves memorabilia, screens Laurel and Hardy films, and receives thousands of visitors annually.

=== Columbia Theatre ===
Originally opened in 1949 as Harlem's first movie theatre, the Columbia Theatre is undergoing redevelopment as part of downtown cultural revitalization.

=== Harlem High School ===
Established in 1871, Harlem High School serves over 1,200 students.

=== Local Business Support ===
The Harlem Merchants Association fosters local economic growth through events, workshops, and community initiatives aimed at supporting small businesses in the city. The Harlem Merchants Association supports local entrepreneurs through networking, events, and community initiatives.

== Notable persons ==
- Oliver Hardy – famed comedian, one-half of Laurel and Hardy; annual Laurel and Hardy Festival held in Harlem.

== Culture & Events ==
=== Oliver Hardy Festival ===
The Oliver Hardy Festival is a free community celebration held annually on the first Saturday in October in downtown Harlem to honor local native and comedy legend Oliver Hardy. Established in 1988, the festival draws 20,000–35,000 attendees, according to estimates from the Harlem Museum and Welcome Center and local businesses—many times larger than the town's population—providing a significant boost to small-town tourism and generating an important yearly economic impact.

=== Media ===
WGAC‑FM (95.1 MHz) is a news/talk radio station licensed to Harlem, broadcasting to the Augusta metropolitan area via simulcast with WGAC 580. It operates under the Beasley Broadcast Group and began under its current format in 2011.

== See also ==
- Central Savannah River Area
