= Transportation in Augusta, Georgia =

Overview
- Locale: Augusta, Georgia
- Transit type: Airports, bridges, bus service, highway and street network, freight train service, boat tours, and marinas

Operation
- Operators: GDOT, City of Augusta, Greyhound Lines, Southeastern Stages, Norfolk Southern Railway, CSX Transportation

The City of Augusta, Georgia has an expansive transport network. It consists of two airports, various road bridges, national and local bus service, a highway and street network, freight train service, and boat tours and marinas.

== Airports ==
=== Augusta Regional Airport ===
Augusta is served by Augusta Regional Airport, formerly known as Bush Field (and still referred to as such on highway signs). It is located approximately 5.6 miles (9.0 km) south of downtown, on Doug Barnard Parkway. It is a relatively small airport, especially when compared to more major airports, such as Atlanta's Hartsfield–Jackson Atlanta International Airport. It has one concrete and one asphalt runway. It opened in 1941 as a training facility for the United States Army Air Corps (USAAC; the predecessor of the United States Air Force). It became the commercial airport for the city in 1950. In 2000, the facility was renamed "Augusta Regional Airport at Bush Field".

=== Daniel Field ===
Daniel Field is a public use airport. It is located approximately 2.5 miles (4.0 km) west of downtown, at the intersection of Highland Avenue and Wrightsboro Road. This airport is owned by the City of Augusta. It has two asphalt runways. It was dedicated in late 1927. During World War II, it also served as a training facility of the USAAC, and was known as "Daniel Army Airfield". At the end of 1945, it was returned to civilian use.

== Named bridges ==
| Bridge | Carries | Crosses | Location | Design | Year built | Span length | Total length | Reference |
|---|---|---|---|---|---|---|---|---|
| Butt Memorial Bridge | 15th Street | Augusta Canal | Northern edge of Medical District | Concrete T-beam | 1914 | 53.2 feet (16.2 m) | 155.8 feet (47.5 m) | |
| H.G. "T" Fulcher Memorial Bridge | SR 56 (Mike Padgett Highway) | I-520 (Bobby Jones Expressway / SR 415) | Approximately 5 miles (8.0 km) south-southwest of downtown | Prestressed concrete Box beam or girder | 1981 | 123.0 feet (37.5 m) | 246.1 feet (75.0 m) | |
| Hugh Lamar Hamilton Memorial Bridge | St. Sebastian Way | Augusta Canal | Northern edge of Medical District | Prestressed concrete Stringer/Multi-beam or girder | 2010 | 71.9 feet (21.9 m) | 144.0 feet (43.9 m) | |
| Jack Callahan Bridge | Walton Way | Hawks Gully | Southern edge of downtown | Concrete Arch bridge | 2005 | 42.0 feet (12.8 m) | 42.0 feet (12.8 m) | |
| James U. Jackson Memorial Bridge | US 25 Bus. / SR 4 (13th Street / Georgia Avenue) | Savannah River | Augusta–North Augusta, South Carolina city line | Steel Stringer/Multi-beam or girder | 1939 | 125.0 feet (38.1 m) | 1,507.0 feet (459.3 m) | |
| Jefferson Davis Memorial Bridge | 5th Street / Rivernorth Drive | Savannah River | Northeastern edge of downtown | Steel Stringer/Multi-beam or girder | 1931 | 120.1 feet (36.6 m) | 1,202.2 feet (366.4 m) | |
| LTG Robert E. Gray Memorial Bridge | Walton Way | 6th Street / railroad tracks of Norfolk Southern Railway | Southeastern edge of downtown | Prestressed concrete Stringer/Multi-beam or girder | 1988 | 74.2 feet (22.6 m) | 74.2 feet (22.6 m) | |
| Pastor H.K. McKnight Sr. Bridge | Greene Street | Hawks Gully | Northwest of downtown | Prestressed concrete Stringer/Multi-beam or girder | 2010 | 71.9 feet (21.9 m) | 71.9 feet (21.9 m) | |
| Richmond Factory Bridge | US 25 / SR 121 (Peach Orchard Road) | Spirit Creek | North-northeast of Hephzibah | Prestressed concrete Stringer/Multi-beam or girder | 1987 | 40.0 feet (12.2 m) | 80.1 feet (24.4 m) | |
| Rosa T. Beard Memorial Bridge | SR 4 (15th Street) | Poplar Street / Wrightsboro Road / railroad tracks of CSX | Southwestern edge of Medical District | Prestressed concrete Stringer/Multi-beam or girder | 1990 | 109.9 feet (33.5 m) | 576.1 feet (175.6 m) | |
| Sand Bar Ferry Bridge | SC 28 / SR 28 (Sand Bar Ferry Road) | Savannah River | Northeastern edge of Augusta | Steel Stringer/Multi-beam or girder | 1989 (eastbound) | 210.0 feet (64.0 m) | 1,983.0 feet (604.4 m) | |
| Sand Bar Ferry Bridge | SC 28 / SR 28 (Sand Bar Ferry Road) | Savannah River | Northeastern edge of Augusta | Steel Stringer/Multi-beam or girder | 1968 (westbound) | 178.2 feet (54.3 m) | 1,949.2 feet (594.1 m) | |
| William "Billy" L. Powell Jr. Bridge | SR 104 (Riverwatch Parkway) | Augusta Canal | Northwest of downtown | | | | | |

== Bus service ==
=== National bus service ===
Southeastern Stages serves Augusta, via a bus station on Broad Street. There is also an intercity bus station on Fort Gordon. Greyhound Lines also uses this bus station. The public can access the Army base for certain events and services, such as utilizing this station. They have to provide proper identification.

=== Public transit ===
The city has an extensive system of bus service. Augusta Transit operates nine routes throughout the area. These routes are:

- Walton Way
- West Parkway
- East Augusta
- Turpin Hill
- Washington Road
- Gordon Highway
- Augusta Mall
- Barton Chapel
- Lumpkin Road

== Highways and streets ==
Augusta has an extensive highway and street network. It consists of two Interstate Highways, four U.S. Highways, ten state highways, and many streets, both major and minor.

=== Numbered highways ===
- I-20 (Carl Sanders Highway)
- I-520 (Bobby Jones Expressway / Deputy James D. Paugh Memorial Highway)
- US 1 (Deans Bridge Road / Gordon Highway)
- US 25 / SR 121 (Peach Orchard Road / Gordon Highway)
- US 25 Bus. (Broad Street / 13th Street)
- US 78 / US 278 / SR 10 (Gordon Highway)
- SR 4 (Deans Bridge Road / Milledgeville Road / Martin Luther King Jr. Boulevard / 15th Street / Walton Way / 13th Street)
- SR 28 (Furys Ferry Road / Washington Road / John C. Calhoun Expressway / Greene Street / 5th Street / Broad Street / Sand Bar Ferry Road)
- SR 56 (Mike Padgett Highway)
- SR 88
- SR 104 (Washington Road / Pleasant Home Road / Riverwatch Parkway / Jones Street / Reynolds Street)
- SR 104 Conn. (Washington Road)
- SR 223 (East Robinson Avenue)
- SR 232 (Bobby Jones Expressway)
- SR 383 (Jimmie Dyess Parkway)
- SR 540 (Fall Line Freeway)
- SR 555 / SR 565 (Savannah River Parkway)

=== Major local streets ===
| Street | Length | | Southern or western terminus | Northern or eastern terminus | Description |
| Street | mi | km | Southern or western terminus | Northern or eastern terminus | Description |
|---|---|---|---|---|---|
| Broad Street | 4.2 | 6.8 | SR 28 at the Lakemont–Summerville–West End neighborhood tripoint | Sand Bar Ferry Road in East Augusta | A major street, which has about half of its length in the downtown area. It is part of the Jefferson Davis Memorial Highway. It connects the northern part of downtown with the Olde Town neighborhood of the city. It connects Lake Olmstead Stadium, the Augusta Public Transit station, the Augusta Canal Discovery Center, the Medical District, the Sacred Heart Cultural Center, Meadow Garden, the Broad Street Historic District, Springfield Village Park, the Museum of Black History, the Morris Museum of Art, Riverwalk Augusta, the Augusta Convention Center, the Augusta–Richmond County Public Library, the Bell Auditorium, James Brown Arena, the Imperial Theatre, the Woodrow Wilson Home, the Augusta Museum of History, the Riverwalk Marina, the Riverfront Marina, and the Boathouse Community Center. It also connects Georgia State Route 28 (SR 28; Washington Road / John C. Calhoun Expressway), Milledge Road, St. Sebastian Way, James Brown Boulevard, US 1/US 25/US 78/US 278/SR 10/SR 121 (Gordon Highway). |
| Central Avenue | 2.7 | 4.3 | Pine Needle Road in Forrest Park | SR 4 in Uptown | A street in the central part of Augusta. It is essentially a northern bypass for Wrightsboro Road, which is between one and three blocks to the south for Central Avenue's entire length. It connects the Charlie Norwood VA Medical Center, University Hospital Summerville, and Paine College. It also connects Highland Avenue, Monte Sano Avenue, Milledge Road, and Georgia State Route 4 (SR 4; 15th Street). |
| Doug Barnard Parkway / Molly Pond Road | 9.4 | 15.1 | SR 56 at the Goshen–Industrial District neighborhood line US 1 / US 25 / US 78 at the Industrial District–South Turpin Hill neighborhood line | US 1 / US 25 / US 78 at the Industrial District–South Turpin Hill neighborhood line Old Savannah Road at the Bethlehem–Turpin Hill neighborhood line | Combined street in the central part of Augusta. The southern part of Doug Barnard Parkway, as well as the northern part of Molly Pond Road, is very important to connect industrial plants of this part of the city with the surrounding area. They connect the West Fraser Augusta Mill, Resolute Forest Products' Augusta Mill, Olin Corporation's Augusta plant, the Augusta plant of StandardAero, Augusta Regional Airport, Phinizy Swamp Nature Park, a plant of Georgia-Pacific, and unloading facilities for Estes Express Lines and Sonoco Products Company (the latter is also the location for Augusta Transportation). They also connect Georgia State Route 56 (SR 56), Tobacco Road, Interstate 520 (I-520; Bobby Jones Expressway), Lumpkin Road, US 1/US 25/US 78/US 278/SR 10/SR 121 (Gordon Highway), and Old Savannah Road. |
| East Boundary Street | 1.0 | 1.6 | Laney Walker Boulevard at the East Augusta–May Park–Industrial District neighborhood tripoint | Reynolds Boulevard / Riverfront Drive East Augusta–Olde Town neighborhood line | A street on the eastern edge of the Olde Town neighborhood of the city. As its name suggests, it serves as the eastern boundary of the main part of the city. It connects Cedar Grove Cemetery, the former location of the home of Edward Telfair (a former governor of Georgia), the Riverfront Marina, and the Boathouse Community Center. It also connects Laney Walker Boulevard, Telfair Street, East Telfair Street, Greene Street, Ellis Street, Georgia State Route 28 (SR 28; Broad Street), and Reynolds Street. |
| Ellis Street | 3.2 | 5.1 | | | A disconnected street in the main part of Augusta. It is split into four segments: a 0.2-mile-long (0.32 km) one and a 0.9-mile-long (1.4 km) one northwest of downtown, a 0.2-mile-long (0.32 km) one completely within downtown, and a 1.9-mile-long (3.1 km) one that is completely in downtown, except for the extreme eastern end. It connects the Sacred Heart Cultural Center, Curtis Baptist School, the Richmond County Board of Education building, the Signers Monument, and the Augusta Richmond County Municipal Building. It connects Milledge Road, Greene Street, James Brown Boulevard, East Boundary Street, and Georgia State Route 28 (SR 28; Broad Street). |
| Greene Street | 2.3 | 3.7 | | | Disconnected major street in the city. It is split into two disconnected segments. Its western segment is a 0.8-mile-long (1.3 km) route west of downtown that functions like a frontage road for Georgia State Route 28 (SR 28; John C. Calhoun Expressway) and as part of one of its exits. Its eastern segment is a 1.5-mile-long (2.4 km) path, mostly in downtown. Its eastbound lanes are split by the eastern part of SR 28 (John C. Calhoun Expressway). Its westbound lanes travel a continuous path through their part of the city. Its eastbound lanes travel 0.9 miles (1.4 km) from SR 104 northwest of downtown to the southwestern part of downtown. They resume at the eastern terminus of the expressway, where SR 28 uses about the next 0.9 miles (1.4 km) of Greene Street and then another 0.6 miles (0.97 km) of Greene Street travel through the southeastern part of downtown. This is a combined total of 1.5 miles (2.4 km) It connects the Augusta Public Transit bus station, the Augusta Canal National Heritage Area Discovery Center, the Medical District, the Sacred Heart Cultural Center, Meadow Gardon, the Morris Museum of Art, Riverwalk Augusta, the Augusta Convention Center, the Augusta Judicial Center, the Augusta–Richmond County Public Library, the Southern Bible Institute and Seminary (the original location of First Baptist Church), the Jessye Norman School of the Arts, the Woodrow Wilson Home, James Brown Arena, the Imperial Theatre, the Augusta Museum of History, the Herbert Institute of Art, the Augusta–Richmond County Municipal Building (also known as the "Government Center"), and the Signers Monument. |
| Heph–McBean Road | 8.2 | 13.2 | | | Disconnected important street in the south-central and southwestern parts of the city. Also known as "Hephzibah–McBean Road", it is split into two pieces, separated by a short piece of US 25/SR 121. The western segment has a length of 2.6 miles (4.2 km) and connects Hephzibah with rural parts of the city. The eastern segment is 5.6 miles (9.0 km) long and extends from US 25/SR 121 to SR 56. It connects McBean Elementary School, the McBean Community Park, and Fire Station No. 12 of the Augusta Fire Department. |
| James Brown Boulevard | 1.4 | 2.3 | | | Major street, mostly in downtown. It was named after James Brown, the entertainer whose hometown was Augusta, after previously being named 9th Street and, before that, Campbell Street. The boulevard effectively splits the downtown area in two. It connects Dyess Park, the Augusta–Richmond County Judicial Center, a United States Post Office vehicle maintenance facility, the Federal Justice Center, the Augusta–Richmond County Public Library, the Richmond County Board of Education building, the Augusta Convention Center, and Riverwalk Augusta. It also connects Twiggs Street, Wrightsboro Road, Laney Walker Boulevard, Walton Way, Telfair Street, Georgia State Route 28 (SR 28; Greene Street), Ellis Street, US 25 Bus. (Broad Street), and Reynolds Street. |
| Laney Walker Boulevard / Laney Walker Boulevard Extension | 4.5 | 7.2 | | | Combined street, mostly within the downtown area of the city. They connect Paine College, the Medical District, the Augusta University Medical Center (AUMC), the Lucy Craft Laney High School, the Lucy Craft Laney Museum of Black History, the A. R. Johnson Health Science and Engineering Magnet High School, the Richmond County Health Department, the main rail yard of Norfolk Southern Railway, a rail yard of CSX, the Georgia–Carolina Fairgrounds, Magnolia Cemetery, an Americold distribution center, Eastview Community Center and Park, a DSM plant, and an unloading facility for Old Dominion Freight Line. They also connect Georgia State Route 4 (SR 4; 15th Street), R.A. Dent Boulevard, James Brown Boulevard, Twiggs Street, East Boundary Street, Interstate 520 (I-520), and SR 28 (Sand Bar Ferry Road). |
| Lumpkin Road | 4.9 | 7.9 | | | A street in southern parts of the main part of Augusta. Its entire length parallels the path of Interstate 520 (I-520). It connects Augusta Technical College, Butler High School, Fleming Park, and the Bernie Ward Community Center. It also connects Old McDuffie Road, US 1/SR 4 (Deans Bridge Road), Richmond Hill Road, US 25/SR 121 (Peach Orchard Road), SR 56 (Mike Padgett Highway), and Doug Barnard Parkway. |
| Meadowbrook Drive / Barton Chapel Road / Augusta West Parkway / Medical Center Drive | 6.9 | 11.1 | | | Combined street in the northwestern part of Augusta, just east of Fort Gordon. They connect Meadowbrook Elementary School, Meadowbrook Park, Glenn Hills Middle, High, and Elementary schools, Augusta Mall, West Augusta Medical Center, and Doctors Hospital. They also connect Windsor Spring Road, US 1/SR 4 (Deans Bridge Road), Old McDuffie Road, Milledgeville Road, US 78/US 278/SR 10 (Gordon Highway), Wrightsboro Road, and Wheeler Road. |
| Milledge Road | 2.3 | 3.7 | | | Disconnected street in the northern part of the city. It is split into two parts, a 0.1-mile-long (0.16 km) that is a residential street and a 2.2-mile-long (3.5 km) northern segment that connects this same area with the area around Lake Olmstead Stadium. It connects Monte Sano Elementary School, University Hospital Summerville, the Episcopal Day School, Augusta Country Club, Lake Olmstead Park, the Georgia National Guard Armory, Lake Olmstead Stadium, and the Augusta Canal National Heritage Area's Lake Olmstead Trailhead. It also connects Central Avenue, Walton Way, Telfair Street, Greene Street, Ellis Street, and Broad Street. |
| Milledgeville Road / Martin Luther King Jr. Boulevard | 6.6 | 10.6 | | | Combined roadway. Part of Milledgeville Road is in Columbia County located in Harlem and the rest of the part of Milledgeville Road is also in Richmond County located in Augusta. They connect Bayvale Park, Rosedale Pond, Bayvale Elementary School, Murphey Middle School, Wilkinson Gardens Elementary School, and Fire Station No. 5 of the Augusta Fire Department. They also connect US 78/US 278/SR 10 (Gordon Highway), Barton Chapel Road, Old McDuffie Road, North Leg Road, Wheeless Road, SR 4 (Deans Bridge Road / 15th Street), 12th Street, Old Savannah Road, and Twiggs Street. |
| Monte Sano Avenue | 1.2 | 1.9 | | | Disconnected short highway in the north-central part of Augusta. It connects a few of the major streets in the area: Wrightsboro Road, Central Avenue, Walton Way, and Wheeler Road. It exists in two disconnected segments: a 0.8-mile-long (1.3 km) segment that connects Maryland Avenue and Walton Way. A block to the east is the 0.4-mile-long (0.64 km) northern segment, which connects Walton Way and Wheeler Road. It connects the Charlie Norwood VA Medical Center, Augusta University's (AU) Forest Hills Campus, AU's Athletic Complex, AU's Summerville Campus, Westover Memorial Park cemetery, and Augusta Country Club. |
| Old McDuffie Road / North Leg Road / Jackson Road / Walton Way Extension / Davis Road | 7.2 | 11.6 | | | Combined important road in the city. The Old McDuffie Road part is split into two parts, separated by Interstate 520 (I-520). Its southern segment is 1.8 miles (2.9 km) long and has a dead end at each end. The remaining 5.4 miles (8.7 km) of the roadway is made up of the northern segment of Old McDuffie Road, and the entire length of North Leg Road, Jackson Road, and Walton Way Extension, and the Richmond County portion of Davis Road. They connect the McDuffie Woods Community Center, Glenn Hills Middle School, Augusta Mall, the Augusta Coca-Cola Bottling Company facility, Copeland Elementary School, the current location of First Baptist Church, and the Augusta Exchange shopping center. |
| Old Savannah Road | 2.4 | 3.9 | | | Disconnected road in the city. Its 0.8-mile-long (1.3 km) southern segment is separated from its 1.6-mile-long (2.6 km) northern segment by a brief portion of US 1/US 25/US 78/US 278/SR 10/SR 121 (Gordon Highway). It connects a Grainger Industrial Supply facility, Engine Company No. 11 of the Richmond County Fire Department, the visitor entrance for Morgan ThermalCeramics, and Carrie J. Mays Park. |
| R.A. Dent Boulevard | 0.8 | 1.3 | | | Important street southwest of downtown. Despite having a length less than 1 mile (1.6 km), it is an important route to connect the Medical District to the surrounding part of the city. It connects the Health Sciences campus of Augusta University, the VA Medical Center, the Augusta University Medical Center, the Museum of Black History, and University Hospital. |
| Reynolds Street | 2.0 | 3.2 | | | Disconnected important street in Augusta. It is split into two disconnected segments, separated by US 1/US 25/US 78/US 278/SR 10/SR 121 (Gordon Highway). Its shorter southern segment travels approximately 0.5 miles (0.80 km) in the northeastern part of downtown. Its longer, and more pertinent, northern segment travels about three times as long, or 1.5 miles (2.4 km), in the north-central and northwestern parts of downtown. It connects East Boundary Street, James Brown Boulevard, and St. Sebastian Way. It also connects the Augusta Riverfront Marina, the Boathouse Community Center, Fire Station No. 1 of the Augusta Fire Department, the Augusta Museum of History, Riverwalk Augusta, St. Paul's Church, the Imperial Theatre, Augusta Common Park, the Augusta Convention Center, the Morris Museum of Art, Augusta University's Riverfront Campus (the former location of Augusta Botanical Gardens), Springfield Baptist Church, the Springfield Village Park, International Brotherhood of Electrical Workers Local 1579, Lake Olmstead Stadium. At 13th Street, Reynolds Street becomes a westbound only street. This intersection is the eastern terminus of SR 104, which uses Jones Street for its eastbound lanes. |
| Richmond Hill Road | 3.5 | 5.6 | | | Major street in the southern portion of the main part of the city. It connects Windsor Spring Road and Lumpkin Road with US 1/SR 4. It connects Sego Middle School, American Legion Post 178, Fire Station No. 6 of the Augusta Fire Department, Hillcrest Memorial Park cemetery, and the former location of Regency Mall. |
| Ruby Drive / Wheeless Road / Highland Avenue / Berckmans Road / Alexander Drive / Cabela Drive | 8.6 | 13.8 | | | Combined roadway that helps to connect the area surrounding the intersection of US 25/SR 121 (Peach Orchard Road) and Lumpkin Road with US 1/SR 4, Richmond Hill Road, Milledgeville Road, US 78/US 278/SR 10, Wrightsboro Road, Central Avenue, Walton Way, Wheeler Road, SR 28, and SR 104. The Highland Avenue portion is split into two segments, separated by one block of Walton Way. Ruby Drive, Wheeless Road, and the southern segment of Highland Avenue comprise the southernmost 4.9 miles (7.9 km) of the route. The northern segment of Highland Avenue, Berckmans Road, Alexander Drive, and Cabela Drive comprise the northernmost 3.7 miles (6.0 km). They connect Butler High School, Wheeless Road Elementary School, Wilkinsons Pond, the Augusta Municipal Golf Course, the Aquatic Center, First Tee Golf Course, Aquinas High School, Daniel Field, Fire Station No. 8 of the Augusta Fire Department, Wood Park, University Hospital Summerville, Charlie Norwood VA Medical Center, downtown, the Medical District, the Augusta Utilities Department Highland Avenue Water Treatment Plant, Westover Memorial Park cemetery, the Augusta National Golf Club, and Fire Station No. 10 of the Augusta Fire Department. |
| St. Sebastian Way | 1.0 | 1.6 | | | Pertinent street northwest of downtown. Despite being very short, it is pertinent as it connects the Medical District with the area outside of downtown. It links University Hospital, Augusta University's (AU) Medical Center (AUMC), AU's Health Sciences Campus, the VA Medical Center, the Walton Rehabilitation Hospital, and the Augusta Canal National Heritage Area Discovery Center. |
| Telfair Street / East Telfair Street | 2.9 | 4.7 | | | Combined important street, partially located in downtown. Telfair Street itself is split into three parts. The western segment is 0.6 miles (0.97 km) long, the central segment is 0.3 miles (0.48 km) long, and the eastern segment is 1.8 miles (2.9 km) long. The very short East Telfair Street is only about 0.2 miles (0.32 km) long. The western and central parts of Telfair Street, as well as the entirety of East Telfair Street, are little more than residential streets. The eastern segment of Telfair Street connects Greene and Ellis streets with James Brown Boulevard, East Boundary Street, and most of the numbered streets in downtown. It also links the Augusta–Richmond County Public Library, the Federal Justice Center, Immaculate Conception Catholic School, the Bell Auditorium, the St. John Towers (one of the tallest buildings in the city), the Woodrow Wilson Boyhood Home, First Presbyterian Church, the Old Medical College, Augusta–Richmond County Municipal Building (also known as the "Government Center"), the Academy of Richmond County's former campus, the Gertrude Herbert Institute of Art, and the Old Government House. |
| Tobacco Road | 8.5 | 13.7 | | | Major road in the southern portion of the main part of Augusta. It connects the southeastern part of Fort Gordon and the Augusta Regional Airport with Windsor Spring Road, US 25/SR 121, SR 56, and Doug Barnard Parkway. The easternmost 1.2 miles (1.9 km) used to carry the route of SR 56 Spur. It also connects Fort Gordon's Gate 5, Jamestown Elementary School, Morgan Road Middle School, a Fresenius Medical Care clinic, Diamond Lakes Regional Park and Library, Tobacco Road Elementary School, Augusta Public Works Maintenance Division, the Richmond County Correctional Institution, Gracewood Park, the Gracewood Community Center, Gracewood Elementary School, the Augusta Site of Solvay, and the airport. |
| Twiggs Street | 1.3 | 2.1 | | | Disconnected important street in the main part of the city, with a very small portion in downtown. It is split into three parts, with two of them meeting just south of downtown. The southern and northern segments are 1.1 miles (1.8 km) and 0.1 miles (0.16 km) long, respectively. These two segments appear to have formerly been one segment, but were split by the path of Walton Way. The short central segment, which connects with the southern segment, is 0.1 miles (0.16 km) long. It connects James Brown Arena with Old Savannah Road, Martin Luther King Jr. Boulevard, James Brown Bulevard, Laney Walker Boulevard, and 7th Street. |
| Walton Way | 6.9 | 11.1 | | | Major street that provides access to the Medical District and downtown. It connects Jackson Road and Walton Way Extension with Highland Avenue, Monte Sano Avenue, Milledge Road, St. Sebastian Way, James Brown Boulevard, Gordon Highway, and nearly every numbered street in the city. It also connects the Augusta Exchange shopping center, Langford Middle School, Augusta University's (AU) Forest Hills campus, AU's athletic complex, AU's Summerville campus, the Episcopal Day School, the Academy of Richmond County, Tubman Junior High School, the VA Medical Center, the Augusta University Medical Center (AUMC), Engine Company No. 2 of the Augusta Fire Department, University Hospital (UH), the Walton Rehabilitation Hospital, Meadow Garden historic home, the Sacred Heart Cultural Center, the Museum of Black History, the Augusta Judicial Center, Riverwalk Augusta, the James Brown Arena, Bell Auditorium, the Woodrow Wilson Boyhood Home, Augusta Regional Airport, the Richmond County Jail, the Richmond County Sheriff's Office, May Park, and Magnolia Cemetery. |
| Washington Road | 4.1 | 6.6 | | | Major road through the central part of the state. It is split into five disconnected segments. It begins at US 29/SR 14 in Red Oak, east of College Park in Atlanta, eastward to Augusta. It travels through the segments of the southeastern part of Fulton County, the central part of Oglethorpe County, the northeastern part of Taliaferro County, and the northwestern and the central parts of McDuffie County. The Columbia–Richmond County segment extends from where Georgia State Route 47 (SR 47) crosses over the Little River on the Lincoln–Columbia county line northwest of Pollards Corner to where it meets its eastern terminus at SR 28's interchange of Broad Street in Augusta. The Augusta portion of Washington Road is a 4.1-mile-long (6.6 km) route. It connects Augusta National Golf Club, Garrett Elementary School, and Lake Olmstead. It also connects Georgia State Route 28 (SR 28; Furys Ferry Road / John C. Calhoun Expressway), Interstate 20 (I-20), Berckmans Road, and Alexander Drive. |
| Wheeler Road | 5.5 | 8.9 | | | Major street in the east-central part of the state. It connects southeastern Columbia County and northeastern Richmond County. For its entire length, it is an urban corridor of the Augusta metropolitan area. It connects Evans and Martinez with Augusta. In Augusta, it extends 5.5 miles (8.9 km) from an interchange with Interstate 20 (I-20; Carl Sanders Highway) on the Martinez–Augusta line to a point southwest of downtown. It connects areas surrounding Doctors Hospital, Langford Middle School, Tutt Middle School, Westminster Schools of Augusta, Westover Memorial Cemetery, Augusta University's Summerville campus, and the Augusta Country Club. |
| Willis Foreman Road | 5.9 | 9.5 | | | Road in southern parts of Augusta. Besides providing access for local business and residents to the surrounding area, it is essentially a connector to link US 1/SR 4 with US 25/SR 121. It also has an intersection with Windsor Spring Road and provides access to Diamond Lakes Regional Park. Portions of the road have a truck restriction which stipulates that vehicles with over six wheels are prohibited. It connects Fire Station No. 7 of the Augusta Fire Department, Diamond Lakes Regional Park, Community Center, and Library, and Willis Foreman Elementary School. |
| Windsor Spring Road | 8.2 | 13.2 | | | Major road that links the main part of Hephzibah with the southern portion of the main part of Augusta. In Augusta, it extends 8.2 miles (13.2 km) from the north-central part of Hephzibah with the central part of Augusta. It connects Willis Foreman Road, Tobacco Road, Meadowbrook Drive, Richmond Hill Road, Interstate 520 (I-520), US 25/SR 121, and Old Louisville Road. It also links Diamond Lakes Regional Park, Community Center, and Library, Willis Foreman Elementary School, Spirit Creek Middle School, Fire Station No. 18 of the Augusta Fire Department, Diamond Lakes Elementary School, Windsor Spring Elementary School, and A. Dorothy Hains Elementary School. |
| Wrightsboro Road | 9.2 | 14.8 | | | Major road in the east-central part of the state. It travels through the northwestern part of McDuffie County, the extreme northern part of Warren County, the southeastern part of Wilkes County, the southern part of Columbia County, and the northeastern part of Richmond County. It consists of two disconnected segments. The western segment connects Thomson to a point southeast of Washington. The eastern segment connects a point east-northeast of Thomson with Augusta. In Augusta, Wrightsboro Road extends approximately 9.2 miles (14.8 km) from an intersection with SR 383 on the Columbia–Richmond county line to the southern portion of the main part of Augusta. It provides access to Sue Reynolds Elementary School, Augusta Mall, Copeland Elementary School, Augusta University's (AU) Forest Hills campus, Forest Hills Golf Club, Augusta Municipal Golf Course, Daniel Field, AU's Summerville campus, the Charlie Norwood VA Medical Center, Monte Sano Elementary School, Paine College, AU's main campus, Lucy Craft Laney High School, C. T. Walker Traditional Magnet School, and A. R. Johnson Health Science and Engineering Magnet High School. |

=== Numbered streets ===
All numbered streets run from north–south.

| Street | Length | | Southern terminus | Northern terminus | Description |
| Street | mi | km | Southern terminus | Northern terminus | Description |
|---|---|---|---|---|---|
| 1st Street | 0.6 | 1.0 | Laney Walker Boulevard at the Industrial District–May Park neighborhood line Watkins Street at the May Park–Olde Town neighborhood line | Hale Street / Hall Street in May Park Reynolds Street in Olde Town | 1st Street is a residential street in the southeastern part of the May Park area and the eastern part of Olde Town area of the city. It is split into two disconnected segments, partially separated by Cedar Grove Cemetery. It connects six of the most major east–west streets in the city, Laney Walker Boulevard, Telfair Street, Greene Street, Ellis Street, Broad Street, and Reynolds Street. |
| 2nd Street | 1.0 | 1.6 | Laney Walker Boulevard at the Industrial District–May Park neighborhood line | Reynolds Street in Olde Town | 2nd Street is a street in the eastern part of the May Park and Olde Town area of the city. It connects Magnolia and Cedar Grove cemeteries with the northeastern part of downtown. It connects six of the most major east–west streets in the city, Laney Walker Boulevard, Telfair Street, Greene Street, Ellis Street, Broad Street, and Reynolds Street. It used to be known as Houston Street. |
| 3rd Street | 1.0 | 1.6 | Laney Walker Boulevard at the Industrial District–May Park neighborhood line | Reynolds Street in Olde Town | 3rd Street is a residential street in the central portion of the May Park area and the western part of the Olde Town area. It connects the Georgia–Carolina Fairgrounds, Magnolia Cemetery, and the May Park. It connects seven of the most major streets in the city: Laney Walker Boulevard, Walton Way, Telfair Street, Greene Street, Ellis Street, Broad Street, and Reynolds Street. It was formerly known as Lincoln Street. |
| 4th Street | 1.1 | 1.8 | Laney Walker Boulevard at the Industrial District–May Park neighborhood line | Bay Street in Olde Town | 4th Street is a mixed-use street in the western part of the May Park and Olde Town areas of the city. It connects the Georgia–Carolina Fairgrounds, Craig Houghton Elementary School, the Richmond County Sheriff's Office, the Richmond County Jail, and May Park. It also connects seven of the most major streets in the city: Laney Walker Boulevard, Walton Way, Telfair Street, Greene Street, Ellis Street, Broad Street, and Reynolds Street. Parts of the street have a truck restriction. It was formerly known as Elbert Street. |
| 5th Street | 1.2 | 1.9 | Laney Walker Boulevard at the Industrial District–May Park neighborhood line | Fifth Street Bridge at the South Carolina state line in Downtown | 5th Street is an important street in the southwestern portion of the May Park area, the northeastern portion of the Laney Walker area, and the eastern portion of downtown. It is split into two parts, separated by the path of Gordon Highway. It connects the Georgia–Carolina Fairgrounds with seven of the most major streets in the city: Laney Walker Boulevard, Walton Way, Telfair Street, Greene Street, Ellis Street, Broad Street, and Reynolds Street. It was formerly known as Button Gwinnett Street. |
| 6th Street | 0.8 | 1.3 | Taylor Street in Laney Walker | Downtown | 6th Street is a relatively narrow street, mostly in downtown. Except for about a block at its southern end, its entire length has railroad tracks of Norfolk Southern Railway. It connects Old Medical College, First Presbyterian Church, the Augusta–Richmond County Municipal Building, the Augusta Museum of History, St. Paul's Church, and Riverwalk Augusta. It also connects five of the most major streets in the city: Telfair Street, Greene Street, Ellis Street, Broad Street, and Reynolds Street. It used to be known as Washington Street. |
| 7th Street | 0.9 | 1.4 | Laney Walker Boulevard / Twiggs Street in Laney Walker | Downtown | 7th Street is an important street that is located mostly in downtown. It connects the James Brown Arena, First Presbyterian Church, the Bell Auditorium, the Woodrow Wilson Boyhood Home, and the River Place Condominiums. It also connects seven of the most major streets in the city: Twiggs Street, Walton Way, Telfair Street, Greene Street, Ellis Street, Broad Street, and Reynolds Street. Its extreme northern part is paved with bricks. It used to be known as McIntosh Street. |
| 8th Street | 1.0 | 1.6 | Laney Walker Boulevard in Laney Walker | Reynolds Street in Downtown | 8th Street is an important street in the city that has a majority of its path in downtown. It connects Dyess Park, the James Brown Arena, a United States Post Office, the Bell Auditorium, Southern Bible Institute and Seminary (which is the original location of First Baptist Church), Jessye Norman School of the Arts, the Lamar Building (the tallest building in the city), and the Imperial Theatre. It also connects seven of the most major streets in the city: Laney Walker Boulevard, Walton Way, Telfair Street, Greene Street, Ellis Street, Broad Street, and Reynolds Street. It used to be known as Jackson Street. |
| 9th Street | see James Brown Boulevard | | | | |
| 10th Street | 1.3 | 2.1 | | | 10th Street is a pertinent street for the city. It is split into three segments. Its southern and central segments are separated by D'Antignac Street. Its central and northern segment are separated by a semi-industrial area. It connects the Richmond County Health Department, the Augusta Judicial Center, the Maxwell House Apartment building (one of the tallest buildings in the city), the Augusta Convention Center, the Morris Museum of Art, and Riverwalk Augusta. It also connects eight of the most major streets in the city: Wrightsboro Road, Laney Walker Boulevard, Walton Way, Telfair Street, Greene Street, Ellis Street, Broad Street, and Reynolds Street. It was formerly known as Cumming Street. |
| 11th Street | 1.4 | 2.3 | | | 11th Street is a pertinent street in the central portion of the Laney Walker part of the city and the western part of downtown. It connects Augusta University's Riverfront Campus with eight of the most major streets in the city: Wrightsboro Road, Laney Walker Boulevard, Walton Way, Telfair Street, Greene Street, Ellis Street, Broad Street, and Reynolds Street. Its former name was Kollock Street. |
| 12th Street | 1.9 | 3.1 | | | 12th Street is an important street in the city, traveling through the north-central portion of the Bethlehem area, and the western portion of both the Laney Walker and downtown areas. It connects John S. Davidson Fine Arts Magnet School, Springfield Village Park, Springfield Baptist Church, and Augusta University's Riverfront Campus. It also connects 10 of the most major streets in the city: Old Savannah Road, Martin Luther King Jr. Boulevard, Wrightsboro Road, Laney Walker Boulevard, Walton Way, Telfair Street, Greene Street, Ellis Street, Broad Street, and Reynolds Street. It used to be known as Marbury Street. |
| 13th Street | 1.4 | 2.3 | | | 13th Street is a very important street in Augusta. It is split into three segments. Its southern and central segments are separated by the A. R. Johnson Health Science and Engineering Magnet High School. Its central and northern segments are separated by one block of D'Antignac Street. Despite it being fairly short, it connects the eastern part of the Medical District with the western part of downtown. It connects University Hospital, Meadow Garden, Walton Rehabilitation Hospital, John S. Davidson Fine Arts Magnet School, and Sacred Heart Cultural Center. It also connects eight of the most major streets in the city: Wrightsboro Road, Laney Walker Boulevard, Walton Way, Telfair Street, Greene Street, Ellis Street, Broad Street, and Reynolds Street. |
| 14th Street | 0.3 | 0.48 | | | 14th Street is a very short street just northwest of downtown. It connects Curtis Baptist School, with three of the most important streets in the city, Greene Street, Broad Street, and Reynolds Street. |
| 15th Street | 2.5 | 4.0 | | | 15th Street is a very important street for the South Turpin Hill, Turpin Hill, and Medical District areas of the city, as well as west of downtown. It connects T. W. Josey High School, Paine College, Augusta University's (AU) Health Sciences campus, the VA Medical Center, AU's Medical Center, and the Augusta Canal National Heritage Area Discovery Center. It also connects nine of the most major streets in the city: Martin Luther King Jr. Boulevard, Wrightsboro Road, Central Avenue, Laney Walker Boulevard, Walton Way, Greene Street, Ellis Street, Broad Street, and Reynolds Street, as well as the John C. Calhoun Expressway. Part of the street is also known as the Ruth B. Crawford Highway. |

== Rail service ==
The January 2008 draft of the Freight Profile for the Augusta Regional Transportation Study indicates that rail cargo accounts for 7% of all freight in the region by weight (2006 TRANSEARCH). Some of the leading commodities shipped out of Augusta are clay, concrete, glass, and stone products. The leading commodity terminating in the area is lumber and wood products.

At-grade railroad crossings are located on many roads throughout the city. The crossings have been a part of city life for many years. Solutions have been sought to reduce the inevitable conflicts between railroad, motor vehicle, and pedestrian traffic. The availability of rail service is a major attraction for new industry and maintaining existing industry.

=== Passenger service ===
Passenger rail service is currently not available in Augusta. Its last long-distance passenger train was the Southern Railway's Aiken-Augusta Special, which had its last run in 1966. Other companies serving the city were the Atlantic Coast Line Railroad and the Central of Georgia Railway. In 1999, the Georgia Transportation Board approved a long-range plan to provide inter-city passenger rail service between Atlanta and other major cities across the state.

=== Freight service ===
There are two freight providers: Norfolk Southern Railway (NS) and CSX.

==== Norfolk Southern Railway ====
The NS mainline track, known as the R-Line, enters the city from the north, crossing the Savannah River and traveling through downtown on the right-of-way of 6th Street, and is known as the Augusta District. The mainline continues to the southeast toward Savannah. NS has two railroad yards in Augusta: the main classification yard is approximately 1 mile (1.6 km) south of downtown. Its second yard, the Nixon Yard, is south of Augusta Regional Airport near the International Paper plant.

==== CSX Transportation ====
The CSX mainline travels through the city in what is essentially an east–west direction. This line, known partially as the Augusta and McCormick subdivisions, connects Augusta to Spartanburg, South Carolina and Savannah. There is a second CSX line, partially known as the Georgia Subdivision, and was formerly owned by Georgia Railroad and Banking Company, is a connection to Atlanta. CSX has two railroad yards in the city. The main railroad yard is located off of Laney Walker Boulevard southeast of downtown. The yard covers approximately 117 acres (47 ha). It consists of an inbound receiving yard and an outbound classification yard. Its second yard, the Harrisonville Yard, is located on 48 acres (19 ha) between Olive Road and Wrightsboro Road.

== Water services ==
=== Augusta Canal tours ===
On the Augusta Canal, there are boat tours. These tours are provided using a Petersburg boat, similar to those used on the Savannah River in the 19th century. They show the textile mills, the Confederate Powderworks, and two of Georgia's only remaining 18th century houses.

=== Marinas ===
Augusta has two marinas, the Augusta Riverfront Marina and the Riverwalk Marina, also known as the 5th Street Marina. The Riverfront Marina has the following amenities: access to the riverfront, boat slip rentals, boat ramp, and picnic shelter. The Riverwalk Marina has the following amenities: a gift shop, public boat slip, boat slip rentals, playground, picnic area, and fuel service. Riverfront Marina is located on Riverfront Drive, in the East Augusta portion of the city, east of Olde Town. Riverwalk Marina is off of 5th Street, just before it crosses over the Savannah River.

== See also ==
- Plug-in electric vehicles in Georgia (U.S. state) § Augusta
