= Medical District (Augusta, Georgia) =

Coordinates: 33.4720°N 81.9877°W

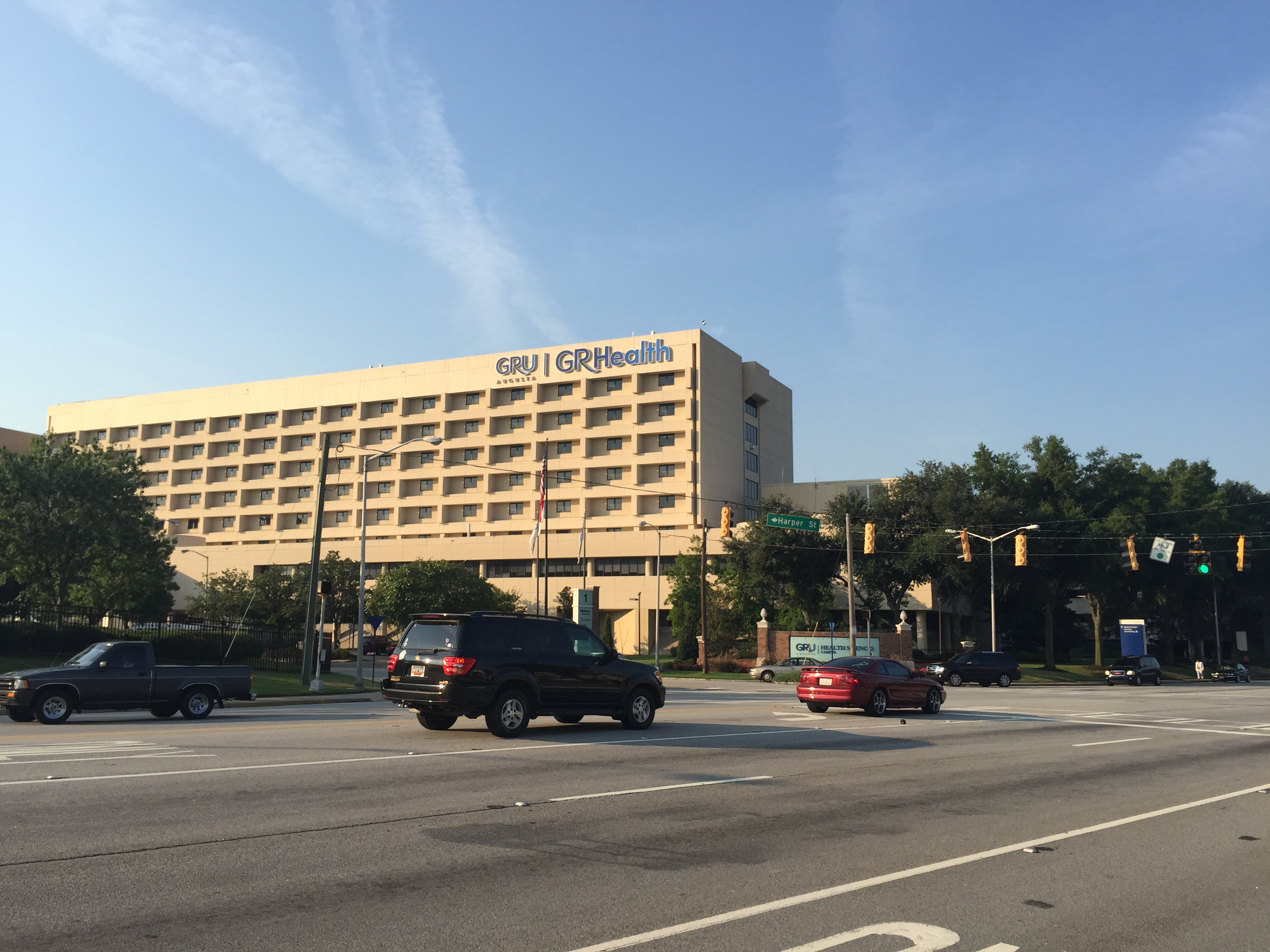
Augusta University Medical Center

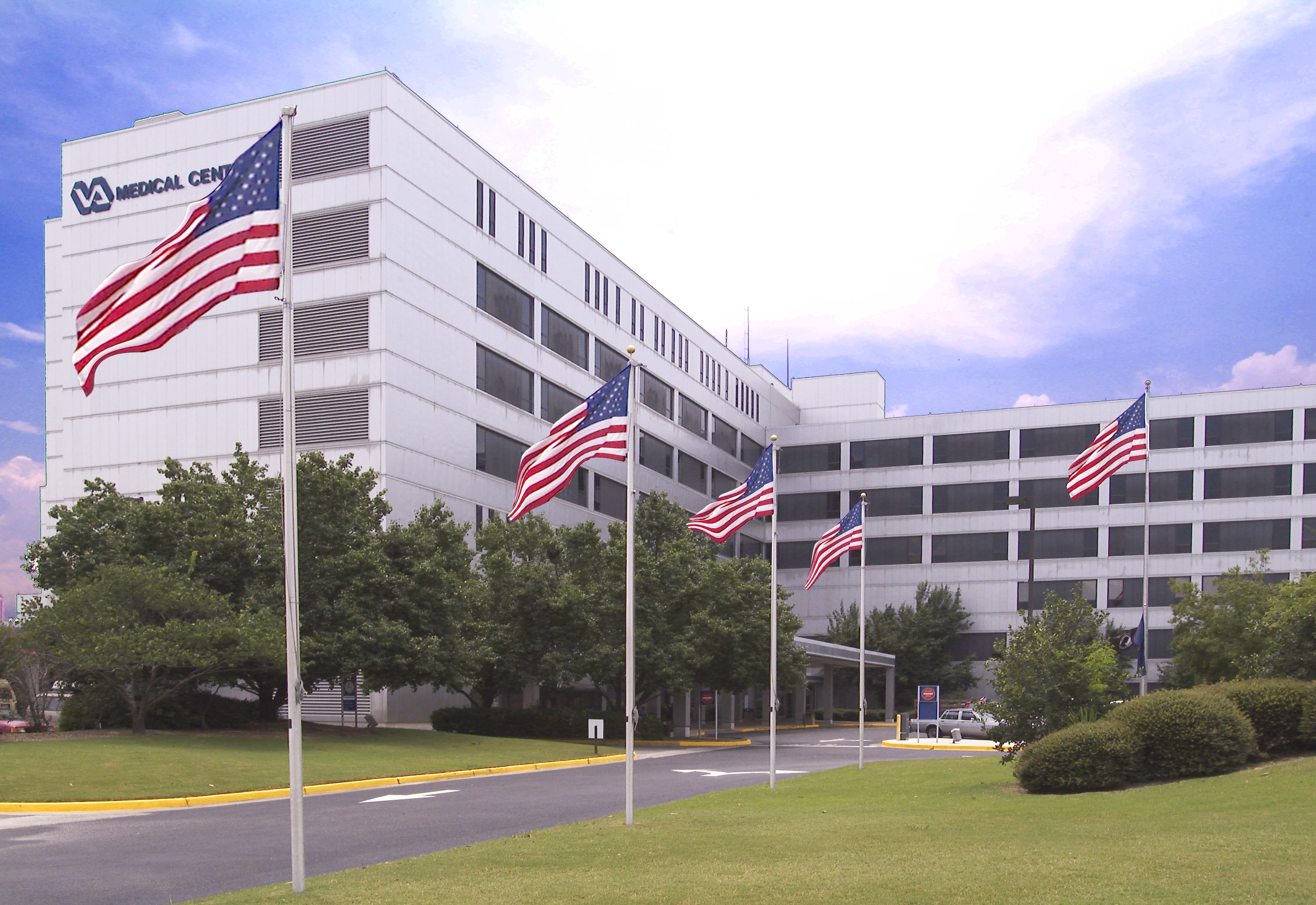
Charlie Norwood VA Medical Center

The Medical District of Augusta, Georgia, is a special-use zoning district located between downtown and Summerville. The district is bounded to the north by Walton Way, to the east by R.A. Dent Boulevard, to the west by Heard Avenue, and to the south by Wrightsboro Road. The district comprises a number of medical facilities and private medical companies.

== Institutions ==
- Augusta University
  - Medical College of Georgia (MCG)
  - Dental College of Georgia (DCG)
  - College of Allied Health Sciences
  - College of Nursing
  - College of Graduate Studies
- Augusta University Health System
  - Wellstar MCG Health Medical Center — 493 licensed beds
  - Children's Hospital of Georgia — 149 licensed beds
  - Ambulatory Care Center — has more than 80 outpatient clinics in one setting
  - Specialized Center — a 13-county Level I trauma center
  - Sports Center
  - Medical College of Georgia Institute of Molecular Medicine and Genetics
- Piedmont Augusta — 581 licensed beds
  - Heart and Vascular Institute
  - Outpatient Center
  - Breast Health Center
- Georgia Radiation Therapy Center
- Augusta Sickle Cell Center
- Specialty Select Hospital — 34 licensed beds
- Augusta Cancer Research Center
- Charlie Norwood VA Medical Center — 155 licensed beds

== See also ==
- Walton Rehabilitation Hospital
- Broad Street Historic District (Augusta, Georgia)
- Summerville (Augusta, Georgia)
