= John S. Davidson Fine Arts Magnet School =

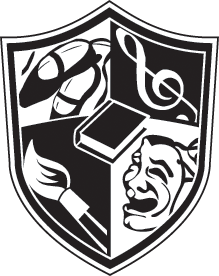

Location
- 615 12th Street; Augusta, Georgia 30901; United States; 33°28′26″N 81°58′32″W

Information
- Type: Public magnet for the fine and performing arts
- Established: 1934 (as elementary school); 1981 (as magnet school)
- School district: Richmond County School System
- Principal: Renee Kelly
- Teaching staff: 69.70 (FTE)
- Grades: 6–12
- Enrollment: 727 (2023-2024)
- Student to teacher ratio: 10.43
- Campus type: Urban
- Colors: Maroon and silver
- Mascot: Titan
- Nickname: DFA
- Tuition: Free
- Website: Davidson Fine Arts Magnet School

John S. Davidson Fine Arts Magnet School (DFA) is a public magnet school for the fine and performing arts located in downtown Augusta, Georgia, United States. It draws students in grades 6 through 12 throughout Richmond County. In addition to a basic curriculum of college preparatory and Advanced Placement academic courses, Davidson offers academic and fine arts courses in the areas of visual arts, music, chorus, dance, cinema production, and theatre. It has been recognized as a National Grammy Signature School, has been ranked as the #1 school in the state of Georgia, and has placed in the top 100 tier of Newsweek's "America's Best High Schools."

== History ==
Davidson was founded in 1934 and named after John S. Davidson (1846-1894), an Augusta native, local educator, and Freemason leader. It was an elementary school from 1934 until 1981. In 1998, Davidson moved from its original site to a new campus one block away between 12th and 13th Street, Walton Way, and Telfair Street. Prior to this, the campus had been split across the original building, a converted police substation, several portable classrooms, and a renovated iron works building, spreading across three city blocks. At the time, it crossed the Augusta Canal's second level. Moving to the new location granted a view of the canal's third level.

The new location has a theater for art performances. Due to student demand, the original stained glass windows created by the class of 1983 were also moved to the new location. The school is within walking distance of historical landmarks in Augusta, including Sacred Heart Cultural Center and the Augusta Canal's first level.

=== Mascot ===
The original mascot for Davidson Fine Arts was the "Rainbow," due to every grade having a specific color. When all the colors combined, they formed a rainbow symbolizing the unity, diversity, and creativity of Davidson. In 2006, after the success of their swimming team, the school administration created an official mascot for sporting competitions. In a school-wide vote, the mascot "Titan" was chosen. Each grade is still represented by a color:

- 6th grade — light green
- 7th grade — light blue
- 8th grade — orange
- 9th grade — purple
- 10th grade — green
- 11th grade — blue
- 12th grade — red

Each grade has a sister class with a similar color, with the exception of 9th grade, whose sister class was the lavender 5th grade class.

== Admissions ==
Admission to Davidson is based upon grades and an audition to determine interest and aptitude in the fine arts. Middle school students audition in all of the fine arts areas and high school students are auditioned in up to two fine arts areas. Classes are admitted to Davidson by racial quotas (45% African American, 45% Caucasian, and 10% other). Overall, there are on average about 700 students split equally among all classes.

== Awards and recognition ==
During the 2004–05 school year and again in 2015, Davidson was recognized with the Blue Ribbon School Award of Excellence by the U.S. Department of Education, the highest award a U.S. school can receive.

The school has consistently been named as one of the best in the state of Georgia, and was named the number one academic school in the state each year from 1996 to 2009, a feat due almost exclusively to the high achievement of the students the school accepts.

The school is also known for its music program; the Davidson Fine Arts Chorale has been named among the best high school choral classes in the nation. In 2004, Grammy Foundation selected Davidson as the Grammy Signature School, and granted the program $25,000.

Awards and recognitions include:

- Recognized as the #1 school in the state of Georgia consecutively through the 1996–2003 school years
- Recognized nationally as the 2004 National Grammy Signature School for its music programs
- Recognized for top SAT scores in the state of Georgia for the last ten years
- 2003–2004: named a National Magnet School of Excellence
- Won first place in the 2004 State Literary Competition
- Won first place in the 2003 (Georgia) One Act Play Competition
- Ranked highest for excellence among magnet schools by the U.S. Department of Education for academic focus and integration of the fine arts
- Named a National Magnet School of Excellence for 2002–2003
- April 1996 issue of Redbook Magazine cited Davidson as one of 155 of the Nation's Best Schools as part of the America's Best Schools project.
- 8 National Merit semifinalists and finalists since 1996
- 22 Commended Merit Scholars since 1996
- 10 National Achievement finalists and semifinalists since 1996
- 25 Commended Achievement Scholars since 1996
- Recognized as a Georgia School of Excellence in 1995
- First-place winner of the 2007 South Eastern Theater Conference
- First-place Orchestra at the 2004, 2005, 2006, and 2007 Fiestaval Competitions
- Semi-finalist at the 2006 Division AAA Georgia Academic Bowl
- Ranked among the top 1% of high schools by Newsweek
- First place winner of the 2007 Georgia Theater Conference (one of only two schools to win twice in a row)
- Received a gold medal and was ranked 84th best high school in the nation by U.S. News & World Report in 2007
- The 2005 GRAMMY Gold Signature School
- The Davidson Chorale selected as 2004 ACDA Southern Division Convention performer, Nashville, Tennessee
- The Davidson Chorale selected as 2005 ACDA National Convention performer, Los Angeles, California
- The Davidson Chorale selected as 2007 MENC Southern Division Convention performer, Charleston, South Carolina
- The Davidson Chorale selected as 2004, 2006, 2008, 2016 GMEA Convention performer, Savannah, Georgia, Athens, Georgia
- The Davidson Chorale selected as 2010 Georgia Music Educators Association In-Service Featured performer
- Ranked number 75 in Newsweek's "America's Best High Schools of 2011"
- Former student Garret Siler was the first magnet school student to play in professional basketball, as a center for the Phoenix Suns.

== Clubs ==
- Academic Bowl
- Chess team
- Davidson Chorale
- Drama club
- The Environmental Club
- Golf team
- High school math club
- High school science club
- High school student council
- Improv Troupe
- International Thespian Society
- Intramurals
- Middle school math club
- Middle school math team
- Middle school science club
- Middle school student council
- Middle school art club
- Model United Nations
- Junior Model United Nations
- Mu Alpha Theta
- National Art Honor Society
- National English Honor Society
- National Junior Art Honor Society
- National Honor Society
- National Junior Honor Society
- National Honor Society For Dance Arts
- Pennies for Peace Committee
- Poetry, fiction, and writing club
- Prom committee
- Spanish club
- Spectrum Players
- Swim team
- Tri-M
- USITT
- Yearbook staff
- Comedy club
- National Beta Club
- Junior National Beta Club
- Jr. Tome Student Literacy Society
- Tome Student Literacy Society
- High School Harmonix Club
- DECA

== Athletics ==
Davidson participates in several district competitive sports, among them track and field, golf, tennis, swimming, and volleyball. The school does not participate in the more traditional high school sports of football, basketball, and baseball.

== Notable alumni ==
- Antonia Gentry — actress

== See also ==
- Richmond County School System
- Augusta Downtown Historic District
- Arts and culture in Augusta, Georgia
- Artists' Row (Augusta, Georgia)
