= Jessye Norman School of the Arts =

Arts program in Augusta, Georgia, U.S.

Coordinates: 33.473481°N 81.965921°W

The Jessye Norman School of the Arts
- Augusta, Georgia, 739 Greene Street; United States

Information
- Other name: JNSA
- Type: Free after-school arts school (501(c)(3))
- Established: 2003
- Founder: Rachel Longstreet Foundation, Inc.
- School district: Richmond County School District (academic schedule alignment)
- Authority: Board of Directors / Rachel Longstreet Foundation, Inc.
- Grades: Middle and high school
- Gender: Coeducational
- Language: English
- Campus type: Urban
- Affiliation: Gertrude Herbert Institute of the Arts (collaborator)

The Jessye Norman School of the Arts is a free, comprehensive after-school arts program serving mostly disadvantaged middle and high school students in Augusta, Georgia, United States. It was founded in 2003 by the Rachel Longstreet Foundation, Inc., and was funded in large part during its first year by its namesake, the celebrated opera singer and Augusta native Jessye Norman, who was very involved in the life of the school in the following years. The School, a 501(c)(3) organization, offers courses in dance, drama, visual art, music (both instrumental and vocal), and creative writing on the same academic schedule as the Richmond County School District.

== Admissions and structure ==
The Jessye Norman School of the Arts is free, and admission is competitive. Acceptance is based on teacher recommendations, academic standing, and an audition/interview process with a panel of arts professionals across the curriculum who gauge the student's talent, level of interest in the arts, and willingness to learn. Once admitted, students are divided into groups that receive approximately 90 minutes of instruction per week in each of five disciplines: dance, drama, visual arts, music (choral and guitar), and creative writing. The school began collaborating with the Gertrude Herbert Institute of the Arts in 2011 to offer photography, fabric art, and pottery instruction to its students.

Although initially targeted at middle school students, the school now also serves high school students as part of its Student Leader Program. These students, who have attended Jessye Norman during their middle school years, continue their arts education while serving as mentors and apprentice teachers to the younger students.

== Mission and history of the school ==
The mission of the Jessye Norman School of the Arts is to provide professional-quality fine arts instruction for gifted and talented children who are economically challenged yet possess a strong desire to pursue the fine arts. Research has shown that young people who participate in arts programs improve their academic performance and school attendance records. Arts instruction has been eliminated in the schools that JNSA serves because of funding cuts and increased emphasis on testing. The Jessye Norman School of the Arts seeks not only to develop its students' artistic abilities but also their academic performance through tutoring and the cultivation of responsibility, discipline, and respect for themselves and others.

The school was first housed at St. John United Methodist Church and drew its first students from Tubman Middle School. By 2007, there were students from nine different schools attending JNSA; currently the school serves students from 11 public and two private schools.

In 2008, Augusta philanthropist Peter Knox donated the building at 739 Greene Street, near the Augusta Downtown Historic District, to the school. Phase 1 of the renovations was completed on the first floor in the spring of 2011.

Enrollment has grown steadily to approximately 75 students for the 2011–2012 school year.

The Jessye Norman School of the Arts is funded by the Rachel Longstreet Foundation, Inc. and is run by its board of directors, along with an advisory council of local artists, teachers, and philanthropists.

== Performances ==
The students stage frequent performances (recent examples include the JNSA Gala Reception, winter, 2010, featuring the All School Choir; the JNSA Student Showcase, spring, 2010; and Poetry Slam and Storytelling Night at Le Chat Noir, spring, 2010) and attend community performances (recent examples include the Paul Taylor Dance Company performance, spring 2011; the Denyce Graves concert at Westobou Festival fall, 2010; Wycliffe Gordon Master Class, fall, 2010; "Augusta's Greatest for Augusta's Youth," JNSA Benefit Concert, summer, 2010; and "An Evening on Broadway 2," Augusta State University Opera Workshop, 2010).
