= Ben Troupe =

American football player (born 1982)

No. 86, 84, 83
- Position: Tight end

Personal information
- Born: September 1, 1982 (age 44); Swainsboro, Georgia, U.S.
- Listed height: 6 ft 5 in (1.96 m)
- Listed weight: 260 lb (118 kg)

Career information
- High school: Butler (Augusta, Georgia)
- College: Florida (2000–2003)
- NFL draft: 2004: 2nd round, 40th overall pick

Career history
- Tennessee Titans (2004–2007); Tampa Bay Buccaneers (2008); Oakland Raiders (2008)

Awards and highlights
- First-team All-American (2003); First-team All-SEC (2003)

Career NFL statistics
- Receptions: 106
- Receiving yards: 1,056
- Receiving touchdowns: 7
- Stats at Pro Football Reference

Benjamin LaShaun Troupe (born September 1, 1982) is an American former professional football player who was a tight end for five seasons in the National Football League (NFL) during the early 2000s. Troupe played college football for the Florida Gators, earning All-American honors in 2003. He was a second-round pick in the 2004 NFL draft, and played professionally for the Tennessee Titans and Tampa Bay Buccaneers of the NFL.

== Early life ==
Troupe was born in Swainsboro, Georgia in 1982. He attended Butler High School in Augusta, Georgia, where he played high school football for the Butler Bulldogs. Following his senior season, Troupe was a PrepStar high school All-American and was recognized by the Atlanta Journal-Constitution as one of the top four tight end prospects in the Southeast.

== College career ==
Troupe accepted an athletic scholarship to attend the University of Florida in Gainesville, Florida, where he played for coach Steve Spurrier and coach Ron Zook's Florida Gators football teams from 2000 to 2003. He finished his college career with sixty-four receptions for 958 yards (14.9 yards per catch) and seven touchdowns. As a senior team captain in 2003, Troupe was a first-team All-Southeastern Conference (SEC) selection and received first-team All-American honors from ESPN, Rivals.com and Sports Illustrated. He was also one of the three finalists for the John Mackey Award, recognizing the nation's best college tight end in 2003. He was a part of the 2000 SEC Championship Team.

== Professional career ==
The Tennessee Titans selected Troupe in the second round with the 40th overall pick of the 2004 NFL Draft. He played tight end for the Titans from 2004 to 2007, and was nicknamed "Troupe Scadoop" by his Titans teammates. During his four seasons with the Titans, he made 106 receptions for 1,056 yards and seven touchdowns.

Troupe signed with the Tampa Bay Buccaneers on March 6, 2008. He was released on September 16, after Buccaneers tight end Jerramy Stevens returned from suspension. Three days after his release from the Buccaneers, Troupe was signed by the Oakland Raiders. He was placed on injured reserve with a foot injury on October 21, and released by the Raiders on November 17.

== Life after football ==
Troupe formerly with ESPN Radio ESPN Coastal Georgia with stations in Brunswick GA and Savannah Ga. Largest ESPN affiliate in the state of Georgia. Co Host of Three and Out with Kevin Thomas and BJ Bennett on the Southernpigskin Radio Network.Published author with True vine Publishing in Nashville Tennessee Uncommon and Unfinished The Ben Troupe Story with BJ Bennett. Founder of The UncommonCru 501C3 Non Profit Enrichment Intrusive Mentoring Program for boys aged 12-18 based in Swainsboro Ga. Speaker. Motivator. Master communicator. Podcaster. Content Creator. Host of 84 Reasons Podcast. Co Host of Winning The Division Podcast. Co Host of The Fan and the End Podcast. Co Host No Weddings In the Fall Podcast. Ordinary Man Living an Extraordinary Life. Sweet Tea and Shade Trees for life.

== See also ==
- 2003 College Football All-America Team
- History of the Tennessee Titans
- List of Florida Gators football All-Americans
- List of Florida Gators in the NFL draft
