= Enterprise Mill =

Coordinates: 33.47748°N 81.9819°W

Enterprise Mill with Augusta Canal in foreground

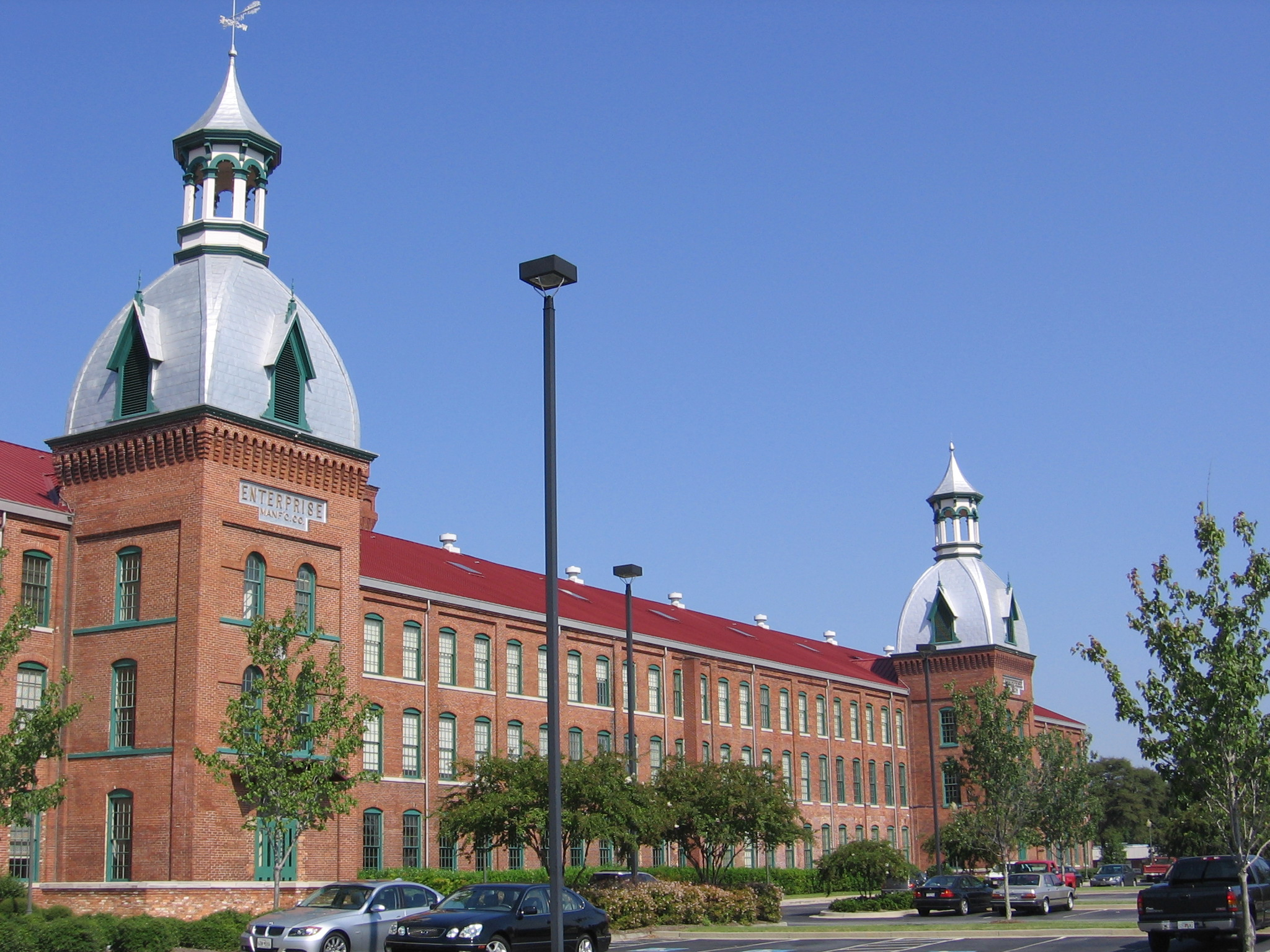
Enterprise Mill

The Enterprise Mill is a historical residential and office complex along the Augusta Canal in Augusta, Georgia. Enterprise is located at the corner of Greene Street and 15th Street.

== Revitalization ==
Enterprise Mill is one of the city's prime historic landmarks. In 1983, Graniteville Company shut down the facility and closed. During the mid and late 1980s, the city originally planned to demolish the aging building at the time, which lasted for 10 years, but city officials later wanted to redevelop the building. A major renovation took place in 1995 as part of the downtown redevelopment. The building remained vacant for another 3 years until in 1998, when developers re-purposed the building into offices and lofts. It is one of the perfect examples of redevelopment in a decaying urban area.

== History ==
Enterprise Mill was developed by James L. Coleman in 1845 and the building opened in 1848 as a flour mill. Originally, Coleman wanted to build it on his plantation, but the city council of Augusta granted a fund to build a canal to supply power, which would ultimately be the creation of the Augusta Canal. Between 1872 and 1875, the Augusta Canal was enlarged and several industrialists came to the area to build facilities around the canal. Much of the original mill, built in grey granite brick, is still standing today, though the bulk of what is recognizable today as the Enterprise Mill was built in red brick in 1877. Like all the great mills of Augusta, it is built on the Augusta Canal. In 1923 the Graniteville Company acquired the mill and eventually added the large red sign bearing the company name atop the structure. The sign still stands today and is most noticeable at night when it glows bright red.

Though for most of its existence the mill was used for various manufacturing ventures, in 1983 the mill ceased operations and closed its doors. For many years it was assumed that the structure would be demolished, but in the mid-1990s the Mill underwent a massive overhaul and was converted into apartments and retail and office spaces. The Enterprise Mill stands as today as an example of the revitalization of downtown Augusta that began in the 1990s.

== See also ==
- Augusta Canal
