= Cumming v. Richmond County Board of Education =

- Supreme Court of the United States

Argued October 30, 1899 Decided December 18, 1899
- Full case name: J. W. Cumming, James S. Harper, and John C. Ladeveze, Plaintiffs in Error, v. County Board of Education of Richmond County, State of Georgia
- Citations: 175 U.S. 528 (more) 20 S. Ct. 197; 44 L. Ed. 262; 1899 U.S. LEXIS 1580

Holding
- The Richmond County tax, which supported high schools open to only white students, was legal. The city was allowed to determine the allocation of funds. Federal interference was justified only if local authorities disregarded constitutional rights.

Court membership
- Chief Justice Melville Fuller Associate Justices John M. Harlan · Horace Gray; David J. Brewer · Henry B. Brown; George Shiras Jr. · Edward D. White; Rufus W. Peckham · Joseph McKenna

Case opinion
- Majority: Harlan, joined by unanimous
- Overruled by
- Brown v. Board of Education, 347 U.S. 483 (1954)

Cumming v. Richmond County Board of Education, 175 U.S. 528 (1899), ("Richmond") was a class action suit decided by the Supreme Court of the United States. It is a landmark case, in that it sanctioned de jure segregation of races in American schools. The decision was overruled by Brown v. Board of Education (1954).

== About the case ==
The plaintiffs, "Cumming, Harper and Ladeveze, citizens of Georgia and persons of color suing on behalf of themselves and all others in like case joining with them," originally filed suit by petition against the Board of Education of Richmond County (the "Board") and one "Charles S. Bohler, tax collector" in the Superior Court of Richmond County, claiming, among other causes of action, that a $45,000 tax levied against the county for primary, intermediate, grammar, and high schools was illegal insofar as the high schools of the county were exclusively for white students and seeking an injunction barring the collection of so much of the total amount as was earmarked for the white only high school system.

County was reversed upon the ground that it erred in granting an injunction against the Board of Education. In accordance with that decision, the Superior Court upon the return of the cause from the Supreme Court of the State, refused the relief asked by the plaintiffs, and dismissed their petition. Thereafter, the plaintiffs appealed that order to the US Supreme Court as being in derogation of their rights under the US Constitution.

== Decision ==
The Supreme Court affirmed on economic arguments, among others. It claimed that there were many more colored children than white children in the area and that the Board could not afford to supply everyone with education. The court reasoned that there was a choice between educating 60 white children and educating no one.

The Supreme Court denied that it had any jurisdiction to interfere in the decisions of the state courts. The decision states in pertinent part:

Under the circumstances disclosed, we cannot say that this action of the state court was, within the meaning of the Fourteenth Amendment, a denial by the state to the plaintiffs and to those associated with them of the equal protection of the laws or of any privileges belonging to them as citizens of the United States,... the education of the people in schools maintained by state taxation is a matter belonging to the respective states, and any interference on the part of Federal authority with the management of such schools cannot be justified except in the case of a clear and unmistakable disregard of rights secured by the supreme law of the land.

The final remark says:

If, in some appropriate proceeding instituted directly for that purpose, the plaintiffs had sought to compel the board of education, out of the funds in its hands or under its control, to establish and maintain a high school for colored children, and if it appeared that the board's refusal to maintain such a school was in fact an abuse of its discretion and in hostility to the colored population because of their race, different questions might have arisen in the state court.

Justice John Marshall Harlan, who was the lone dissenter in Plessy v. Ferguson, wrote the opinion for a unanimous court.

== See also ==
- List of United States Supreme Court cases, volume 175

== Sources ==
- Connally, C. Ellen (2000). "Justice Harlan's 'Great Betrayal'? A Reconsideration of Cumming v. Richmond County Board of Education". Journal of Supreme Court History. 25 (1): 72–92. doi:10.1111/1059-4329.00005. S2CID 143689082.
