= Jonathan Williams (defensive lineman) =

American gridiron football player (born 1985)

No. 75
- Position: Defensive lineman

Personal information
- Born: November 22, 1985 (age 40); Augusta, Georgia, U.S.
- Listed height: 6 ft 2 in (1.88 m)
- Listed weight: 282 lb (128 kg)

Career information
- High school: Glenn Hills (Augusta)
- College: South Carolina
- NFL draft: 2009: undrafted

Career history
- Arkansas Twisters (2009); BC Lions (2009); Spokane Shock (2011–2013); Toronto Argonauts (2013); Ottawa Redblacks (2014–2015); Saskatchewan Roughriders (2016)

Career AFL statistics
- Tackles: 12
- Sacks: 3.5
- Forced fumbles: 4
- Fumble recoveries: 4
- Interceptions: 0
- Stats at ArenaFan.com
- Stats at CFL.ca (archive)

Jonathan Lamont Williams (born November 22, 1985) is an American former professional football player who was a defensive lineman in the Canadian Football League (CFL). He played college football for the South Carolina Gamecocks. He was a member of the Arkansas Twisters, BC Lions, Spokane Shock, Toronto Argonauts, Ottawa Redblacks and Saskatchewan Roughriders. He was selected by the Redblacks in the first round of the 2013 CFL Expansion Draft and played there for two seasons before being released prior to the 2016 season. On June 15, 2016, Williams signed with the Saskatchewan Roughriders.
