= First Baptist Church (Augusta, Georgia) =

Historic church in Georgia, United States

- First Baptist Church of Augusta
- U.S. National Register of Historic Places
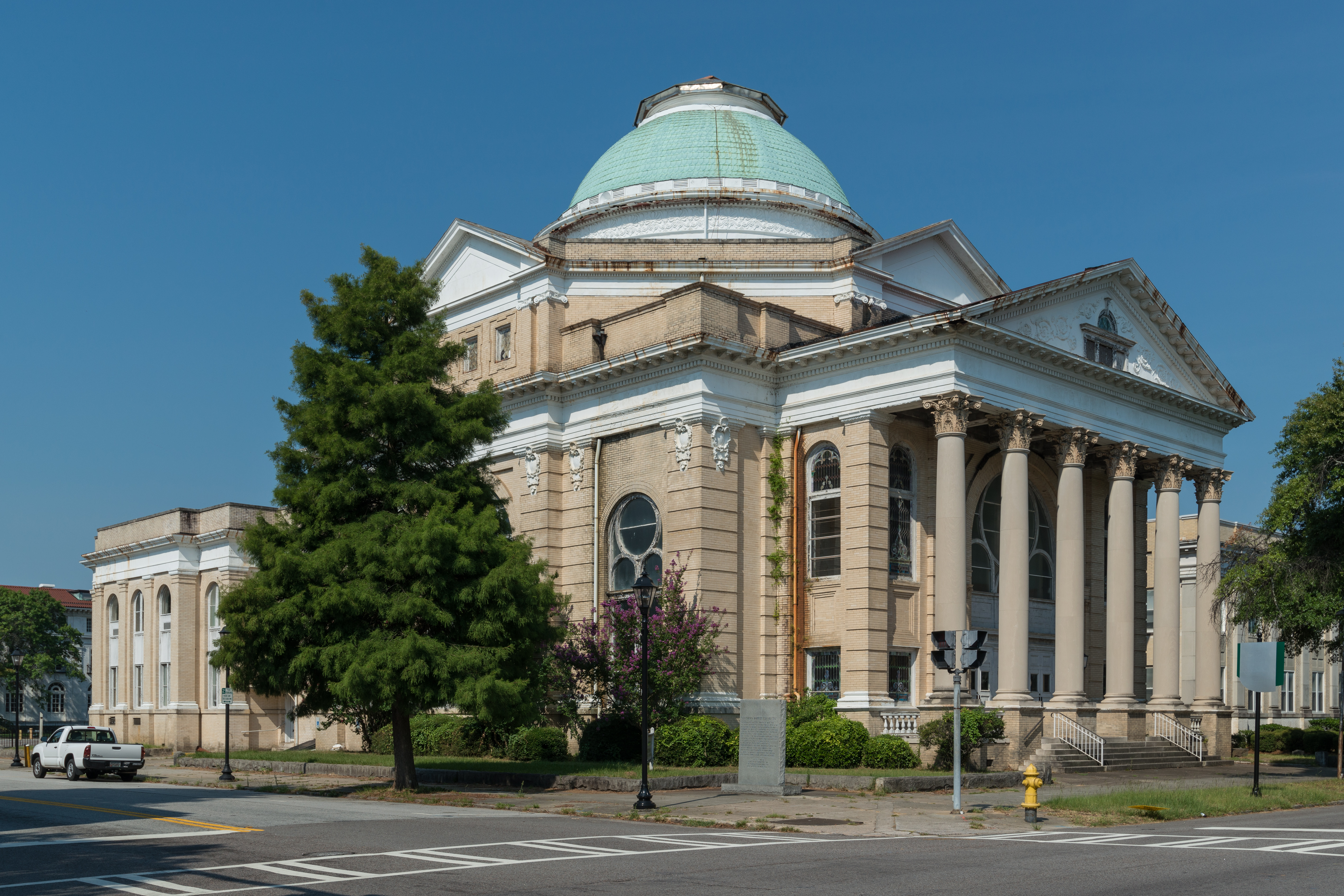

- Location within Georgia Location within the United States
- Location: Greene and 8th Sts., Augusta, Georgia
- Coordinates: 33°28′21″N 81°58′3″W
- Area: 1 acre (0.40 ha)
- Built: 1902
- Architect: Denny, Willis Franklin
- Architectural style: Beaux Arts
- NRHP reference No.: 72000397
- Added to NRHP: March 23, 1972

First Baptist Church of Augusta is a Baptist church in Augusta, Georgia. The original location is now a historical site. The current church building is located on Walton Way.

== Baptists Praying Society ==
According to the earliest church records, the Baptists Praying Society was established when

In the year 1817, Jesse D. Green, a layman, was active in gathering together the few scattered Baptists in Augusta, and, after holding one or more preliminary meetings, the brethren and sisters, to the number of eighteen, had drawn up and adopted a covenant, to which they affixed their names.

In May 1817, they met in the court house for worship. A few years later in 1820, Rev, Wm. T. Brantly was chosen for the pastoral office, and he undertook erecting a brick house at 802 Greene St., at a cost of $20,000. It was dedicated on May 6, 1821.

The Southern Baptist Convention was formed at a meeting May 1845 in the First Baptist Church of Augusta, marking the separation before the American Civil War over issues of slavery and governance.

== Historical marker ==
A historical marker was erected in 1956 outside the church by the Georgia Historical Commission (Marker Number 121–29.) It is inscribed as follows:

In March 1817, eight men and two women meeting in an Augusta home formed "The Baptist Praying Society of Augusta" - the forerunner of the First Baptist Church. Two months later the society was constituted a church under the leadership of the first minister, Wm. T. Brantley, this property was purchased in 1870. A church on this site was dedicated May 26, 1821. In 1845, after serious friction arose in the national Triennial Convention, 327 delegates from eight southern states and the District of Columbia met here to form the Southern Baptist Convention. This building was erected in 1902.

== Greene Street building ==
In 1975, the congregation moved to a new church on a site in Augusta on Walton Way. They sold their former church building to the Southern Baptist Non-Profit Historical Society.

In August 2020, Joe Edge a local Augusta real estate developer purchased the building with plans to save the structure and redevelop it. The building fell into disrepair in the early 2000s and was abandoned after 2015. Edge purchased the building in 2020 to convert the back portion into office space and to restore the exterior of the building.
