= Doctors Hospital (Augusta, Georgia) =

Geography
- Location: Augusta, Georgia, United States
- Coordinates: 33°29′11″N 82°5′41″W

Organization
- Care system: Public
- Type: General

Services
- Emergency department: Yes
- Beds: 350

History
- Founded: 1973

Links
- Website: www.doctors-hospital.net
- Lists: Hospitals in Georgia

Doctors Hospital is a 350-bed full-service tertiary care center located in Augusta, Georgia.

== Facilities ==
The facilities on the Doctors Hospital campus include:

=== Joseph M. Still Burn Center ===
The Joseph M. Still Burn Center is the largest medical burn facility in the United States. Located in Augusta, Georgia (United States), it is part of the Doctors Hospital campus, and serves as a primary burn care center for the Southeastern United States. The 99-bed unit sees admission of more than 3,000 inpatient admissions annually, one-third of them pediatric patients. Dr. Joseph M. Still, Jr., founded the center in 1978, beginning with one bed in the intensive care unit of Doctors Hospital, eventually expanding to the present facility, becoming the third largest burn center in the world. In 2011, the Joseph M. Still Burn Center was recognized as a participant in the Georgia Trauma Network as a designated Burn Center. This designation makes the burn center part of the Georgia Trauma Care Network, a group of hospitals and medical centers statewide with the resources to care for the most traumatically injured patients. In addition, the Burn Center was verified by the American Burn Association and the American College of Surgeons. It is the only “verified” Burn Center in Georgia, as well as the only Trauma program in the state verified by the American College of Surgeons.

The Joseph M. Still Burn Center operates several community outreach educational programs designed to prevent burn injuries, especially targeted at children, as they make up approximately 30% of the patient population of the center.

In February 2021, Doctors Hospital officials officially opened the Fred Mullins, M.D. Tower at the Joseph M. Still Burn Center named in honor of the late medical director of the Burn Center who died the previous year. The new facility doubled the number of ICU beds as well as added over 20 new available rooms. Features also included two helipads as well as a new outdoor area for visitors and patients at the facility.

=== West Augusta Radiation Oncology Center ===
It is a leading facility in radiation therapy.

=== Breast Diagnostic Center ===
Specializes in breast cancer treatment.

=== Women's Center ===
Is a facility specializing in osteoporosis and the stages of pregnancy.

== Expansion ==
In 2007, Doctors Hospital added a new High Density MRI and the latest technology in diagnostic imaging support with Digital PACS. The Cancer Care Center continues to grow with the addition of the new Cancer Care Resource Center and radiation therapy. The Women's Center has also been renovated. The new expansion of Doctors Hospital include a new 3-story building that will add more private rooms and a new Intensive Care Unit.

== See also ==
- Augusta University Medical Center
- University Hospital (Augusta, Georgia)
- University Hospital Summerville
