= A. R. Johnson Health Science and Engineering Magnet High School =

Augustus R. Johnson Health Science and Engineering Magnet Middle and High School

Location
- 1324 Laney Walker Boulevard; Augusta, Georgia 30901; United States; 33°27′57″N 81°58′54″W

Information
- Type: Public magnet specializing in health science and engineering studies
- Motto: "Dawn of A New Age"
- Established: 1937; 89 years ago (as junior high school); 1980; 46 years ago (as magnet high school)
- School district: Richmond County School System
- Principal: E.J. Sharif
- Teaching staff: 59.50 (FTE)
- Grades: 6–12
- Average class size: 20
- Student to teacher ratio: 11.03
- Campus type: Urban
- Colors: Purple and white
- Sports: Tennis, soccer, volleyball, golf, track, and cross country
- Mascot: Panther
- Nickname: Panthers and Lady Panthers
- Accreditation: Georgia Accrediting Commission; Southern Association of Colleges and Schools
- GHSGT average: 100%
- Newspaper: The Panther Print
- Partners in Education: Medical College of Georgia
- Website: A. R. Johnson Magnet School

Augustus R. Johnson Health Science and Engineering Magnet Middle and High School is a public seven-year magnet school in downtown Augusta, Georgia, United States. It draws students from grades six through twelve from all parts of Richmond County.

== Academics ==
A. R. Johnson is accredited by the Georgia Accrediting Commission and the Southern Association of Colleges and Schools.

Aside from the standard college preparatory academic courses, Johnson offers specialized training in health sciences and engineering, and the opportunity for vocational training and dual high school/college enrollment for health science students. The school has consistently been regarded as one of the best in Georgia, regularly ranking among the top three best schools in the state.

=== Awards and recognition ===
The school received the Blue Ribbon Award in 2003 and received the 2005, 2006, and 2007 Georgia Achievement Platinum Award. In 2007 and 2009, it received a silver medal and was listed as one of the top schools in the nation by U.S. News & World Report.

== History ==
The school opened in 1892 as Mauge Street Grammar School, taking on the name "A. R. Johnson Junior High School" in 1937. From 1945 to 1949, it served as a senior high school, and in 1956 a new building was erected to serve as the junior high school. In 1980, the school was established as an examination school. In 1980–81, A. R. Johnson Junior High School became "A. R. Johnson Health Professions High School". Under its new name, it served as a pilot program, using funds from a Magnet Implementation/Planning Grant. In 1984, feasibility studies were undertaken to introduce an engineering program at the school, which began in 1985.

On September 7, 2008, the school opened a new building that included an open-air cafeteria, an observatory deck overlooking the school's library, and its first elevator. The new building featured a dome skylight and modern layouts. The old gymnasium is currently in use as the auditorium. The expansion project was completed in 2008, and seventh and eighth graders began attending the school in August 2009. In 2015 a new wing was added for sixth graders, in August 2015 sixth graders began attending.

=== Background ===
The school is named for Augustus Roberson Johnson (1853–1908), an African American teacher in Augusta during the late 19th century.

=== A. R. Johnson's mascot ===
The school's mascot is the panther. Male sports teams are known as the Panthers, and female teams are known as the Lady Panthers. During the latter half of the 2008–2009 school year, a mural of the mascot was painted on the wall on the hall nearest the office at the front of the building. It is visible from the street.

== Student activities ==
=== Athletics ===
Johnson participates in several district competitive sports, among them track, cross country, soccer, golf, tennis, and volleyball. The school does not participate in the more traditional high school sports of football, basketball, and baseball.

== Clubs ==
- HOSA (Health Occupations Students of America)
- FBLA (Future Business Leaders of America)
- Literary Competition Team
- Math Team
- Academic Decathlon Team
- Video Team
- Ecology Club
- TSA (Technology Student Association)
- NSBE (National Society of Black Engineers)
- Foreign Languages Club
- Golf Team
- Soccer Team
- Tennis Team
- Track Team
- Cross Country Team
- Volleyball Team
- Prom Committee
- Ring Committee
- Chorus
- Yearbook/Journalism Staff
- Student Council
- Art Club
- Foreign Language Club
- Girl Talk
- Girls who code

== Notable alumna ==
- Jessye Norman — opera singer, attended as A. R. Johnson Junior High School

== Alma mater ==
Alma mater

We are the hopes of tomorrow.
We are the dreams of today.
We are the students of Johnson.
We are leaders of the way.
Along life's road we'll travel,
First together and then alone,
But never shall we forget the days
When we started out as one.

Purple and White, Royal and Pure,
To you dear Johnson
We shall always be true.

We'll remember Johnson to the end,
The times we shared, the plans we made.
The laughter, the joy, and the tears
Our gain – our loss – our fears.
An institution of learning, an institution of care
An institution of love – that taught us all to share.

Purple and White, Royal and Pure,
To you dear Johnson

We shall always be true.

== See also ==
- Engineering
