= Olde Town, Augusta =

Section of Augusta, Georgia

Coordinates: 33.469°N 81.952°W

Olde Town is a small section of Augusta, Georgia. It is located in Richmond County, Georgia.
