= Glenn Hills High School =

Public high school in Augusta, Georgia, United States

Glenn Hills Comprehensive High School

Location
- 2840 Glenn Hills Dr; Augusta, (Richmond County), Georgia; United States; 33°25′39″N 82°04′05″W

Information
- Type: Public high school
- Established: 1967
- School board: Richmond County Board of Education
- School district: Richmond County School System
- Superintendent: Kenneth Bradshaw
- Principal: Don Quarles
- Staff: 74.60 (FTE)
- Grades: 9–12
- Enrollment: 852 (2023–2024)
- Student to teacher ratio: 11.42
- Campus: Suburban
- Colors: Columbia blue and silver
- Mascot: Spartan
- Website: Glenn Hills High School

Glenn Hills Comprehensive High School is a public high school located in the south Augusta area of Augusta, Georgia, United States. It opened in 1967.

== Athletics ==
The school mascot is a Spartan, and the school colors are Columbia blue and silver.

== Notable alumni ==
- William Cunningham – NBA center
- Michael Curry – NBA player and head coach
- Jerry Ellison – NFL running back
- Chuck Evans – NFL fullback
- LeRoy Irvin – NFL cornerback
- George Kitchens – US Olympic and national champion long jumper
- Jonathan Williams – NFL defensive lineman

== See also ==
- Richmond County School System
