= Imperial Theatre (Augusta, Georgia) =

Theater and former movie theater in Augusta, Georgia, United States

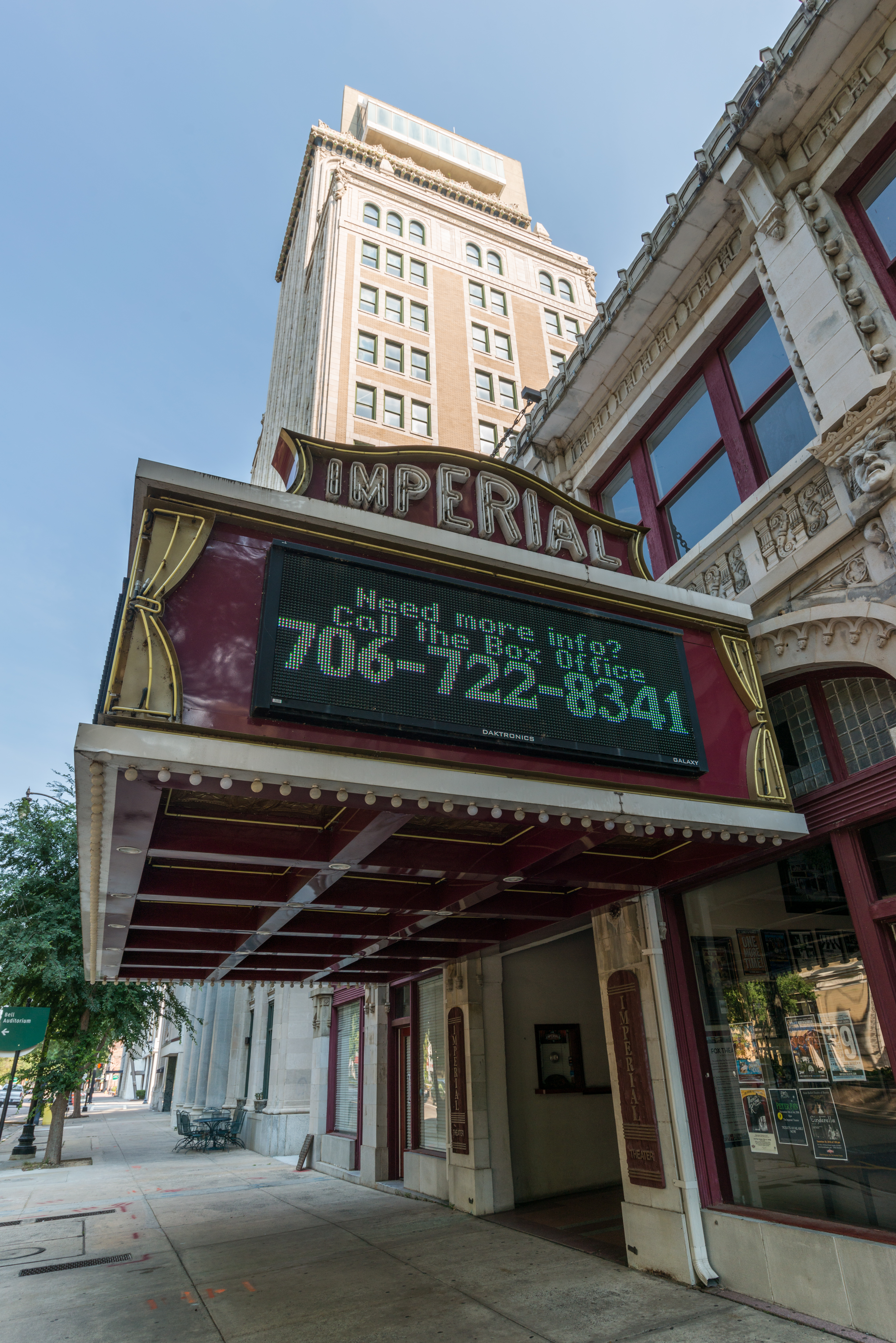
- Interactive map of Imperial Theatre
- Address: 749 Broad St; Augusta, Georgia, 30901; USA
- Coordinates: 33.4754°N 81.9645°W
- Capacity: 853

Construction
- Opened: February 18, 1918

Website
- imperialtheatre.com

The Imperial Theatre is an 853-seat theater located in downtown Augusta, Georgia, United States. The theater opened on February 18, 1918.

== History ==
Augusta's Imperial Theatre began in 1917 as a vaudeville showcase named The Wells Theatre. It was founded by impresario Jake Wells and was designed by architect G. Lloyd Preacher in the Victorian Renaissance style for a total cost of $47,792.00.

The 1918 price listing for opening night was:

- Matinee: $0.10 and $0.20
- Evening: $0.15
- Orchestra $0.35
- Balcony: First Section: $0.35, Remainder: $0.25, Gallery (Colored Section) $0.15

=== The Wells Becomes The Imperial ===
On Sunday, October 6, 1918, over 3,000 cases of Spanish flu were reported. With the death of 52 servicemen from a local military camp (now known as Fort Gordon), the city announced the closure of all public venues, including the theater. The quarantine began October 7, and during this time Jake Wells encountered great financial difficulties. He sold The Wells to Lynch Enterprises. On November 27, 1918, shortly after the sale, the quarantine is lifted. Two weeks later, the theater opened under the name of Jake Wells with The B. F. Keith Supreme Vaudeville Co. After the acquisition of several other local theaters by Lynch Enterprises, The Wells Theatre was renamed to The Imperial Theatre. In 1929, as vaudevillian acts decreased in popularity and motion pictures enjoyed meteoric success, Miller decided to renovate the Imperial into a full-time movie house in the popular Art Deco style. In March 1936, The Trail of the Lonesome Pine, starring Henry Fonda and Fred MacMurray, became the first color film to be shown at the Imperial. It is in the Broad Street Historical District and is listed on the National Register as important to the character of the district.

Due to the decline of the downtown area, the Imperial continued as a film theater until it closed in 1981. In 1985, it was recognized for its architectural significance and reopened as a performing arts venue with the help of local performing arts groups like the Augusta Ballet and the Augusta Players.

Today, the Imperial Theatre offers musicals, dance, concerts, comedy and more. It is noted in the National Register as critical to the character of the Broad Street Historic District. Currently, the Imperial is the only operating historic theater in Augusta. The Imperial has hosted the Augusta Ballet, the Augusta Players, as well as the Morris Museum of Art's Southern Soul + Song Series, Storyland Theatre, Dance Augusta, Columbia County Ballet, Ed Turner and the Number 9 Band, Westobou Festival events and the Poison Peach Film Festival.

Among the earliest recorded appearances was the visit of Charlie Chaplin, who appeared at the theater on April 18, 1918, selling Liberty war bonds. Included in this bill of fare was Leo Carrillo, who later became the Cisco Kid's partner, Pancho; and the famous ballet dancer Anna Pavlova.

== See also ==
- Broad Street Historic District (Augusta, Georgia)
- Arts and culture in Augusta, Georgia
