= Butler High School (Augusta, Georgia) =

Public high school in Augusta, Georgia, United States

Coordinates: 33.41811°N 82.01746°W

George P. Butler Comprehensive High School
- Augusta, (Richmond County), Georgia; United States

Information
- Type: Public high school
- Motto: "Educating and empowering tomorrow's self-sufficient citizens."
- Established: 1960
- School district: Richmond County School System
- Superintendent: Angela Pringle
- Principal: Stacey Mabray
- Staff: 51.60 (FTE)
- Grades: 9–12
- Enrollment: 878 (2024–2025)
- Student to teacher ratio: 17.02
- Campus: Suburban
- Colors: White and old gold
- Athletics: Myron Newton, Athletic Director
- Sports: Football, wrestling, soccer, basketball, softball, track, cross country, volleyball, and baseball
- Mascot: Bulldog
- Nickname: Bulldogs, Mighty Dogs, Big Dogs
- Endowment: o
- Website: http://butler.rcboe.org/

George P. Butler Comprehensive High School is a public high school located in the South Augusta area of Augusta, Georgia, United States. It is named for George Phineas Butler.

Butler was the second white high school built in Richmond County prior to desegregation. It opened in 1960 and remained segregated until 1967.

== History ==
On March 23, 1983, the new music complex at Butler High School was named the "Terri Gibbs Music Center" in honor of country and gospel singer Terri Gibbs, a 1972 Butler High graduate. At the dedicatory service, Gibbs played the piano and sang the state song, "Georgia on My Mind." Terri, blind from birth, was a resident of Columbia County and was allowed to attend Butler High School because Butler offered a special education program for handicapped students.

The center is a structure to develop the musical talents of students. At one end of the building is a large chorus rehearsal room, and at the other end is a large room for rehearsal of Butler High's band. Between these anchor rooms are several individual practice rooms and individual offices for the band and choral directors.

== Student activities ==
=== Athletics ===
The school mascot is the bulldog, and the school colors are old gold and white. The school's athletic complexes are called "Bulldog Country."

Butler was the 1966 State Basketball Champion under Coach Sonny Poss. There were no substitutions for the entire tournament. Barry Timmerman was MVP, scoring a record 44 points in a single game, a high school record that stood for over 40 years. Don Coleman now has the record with 49 points in a single game in the region championship game.

== Notable alumni ==
| Name | Class year | Notability | Reference(s) |
|---|---|---|---|
| Terri Gibbs | 1972 | country and gospel singer | |
| Wycliffe Gordon | 1985 | jazz trombonist | |
| Bubba Diggs | 1978 | 1981 Clemson National Championship | |
| Rocky Turner | 1968 | NFL player | |
| Sammy Lilly | 1983 | NFL player | |
| Carlos Rogers | 2000 | NFL player | |
| Ben Troupe | 2000 | NFL player | |

== See also ==
- Richmond County School System
