= Lucy Craft Laney High School =

School in Augusta, Georgia, US

Lucy C. Laney Comprehensive High School: The Academy of Advanced Placement Studies

Location
- 1339 Laney Walker Blvd; Augusta, (Richmond County), Georgia 30901; United States; 33°28′02″N 81°58′57″W

Information
- Former names: Haines Normal and Industrial Institute
- Type: Public high school
- Motto: "Leading Advancing Nurturing Educating Youth"
- Established: 1949
- School district: Richmond County School System
- Superintendent: Angela Pringle
- Principal: Marquez Hall
- Staff: 64.10 (FTE)
- Grades: 9–12
- Enrollment: 736 (2023–2024)
- Student to teacher ratio: 11.48
- Campus: Urban
- Colors: Red, gray, and white
- Athletics conference: 3 AAA
- Sports: Football, basketball, baseball, soccer, cross country, track and field, cheerleading, golf, tennis, volleyball, and wrestling
- Mascot: Wildcat
- Nickname: Wildcats and Lady Wildcats
- Website: https://laney.rcboe.org/

Lucy C. Laney Comprehensive High School (Laney High School) is a public high school in the Laney-Walker district of Augusta, Georgia, United States. It was formed in 1949 by combining the A. R. Johnson and Haines Normal and Industrial Institute. From the merger, Laney derived the mascot, the "Wildcat," and the school colors of red and grey.

In the summer of 1951, the old building was torn down on the Haines site, and the new building was started. During the construction, classes were held at another site. In September 1953, Lucy Laney High School moved into its new building with Dr. C.W. Johnson as principal. In 1964, the music building was added with spacious new choral and band rooms. In 1981, renovations were made to the building to update the library facilities and the main offices. Air conditioning was installed.

During the 1996–97 school year, work started on a renovation for school improvements costing approximately seven million dollars. This added ten new classrooms, a technology lab, a new media center, an expansion of the gym with a concession area, and new restrooms and furnishings. The new facilities were completed during the 1997–98 school year. In the fall of 2007, a new 12 million-dollar athletic complex was opened, which included a 9000-seat football stadium. The school had previously been without a home field for over 30 years.

In 2014, Laney High School began another major renovation project. Students attended the nearby Tubman Education Center while the school was given a complete 23 million-dollar overhaul. The new facility opened in the fall of 2016 and includes 23 new classrooms, a fine arts building, a cosmetology lab, a mock courtroom for the law and justice program, a rifle range for the Reserve Officers' Training Corps, upgraded cafeteria with outdoor seating for seniors, and a new gymnasium.

Laney High School now offers two magnet programs open to all students of Richmond County. The Academy for Advanced Placement Studies enables students to pursue college-level studies while still in high school by offering numerous AP courses. Beginning in the fall of 2017, the Early College Academy will admit qualified students to take accelerated courses in grades 9 and 10 and then enroll full-time at Augusta University during grades 11 and 12.

Female literacy rate of graduates is 63%, whereas male literacy rate of graduates is 42%. This is comparatively high for a high school in a deprived area.

== Notable alumni ==
- Chip Banks, NFL linebacker
- Kendrell Bell, NFL linebacker
- Emerson Boozer, NFL running back
- Corvey Irvin, NFL defensive tackle
- Jessye Norman, opera singer, soprano
- Curtis Rouse, NFL offensive lineman
- Jermaine Smith, NFL defensive tackle
- Robert Turner (born 1993), basketball player in the Israeli Basketball Premier League
- Jaylen Watson, Super Bowl Champion NFL defensive back
- Bob Wells, NFL offensive tackle

== See also ==
- Richmond County School System
