= Riverwalk Augusta =

Urban park in Augusta, Georgia, United States

Coordinates: 33°28′47″N 81°58′5″W

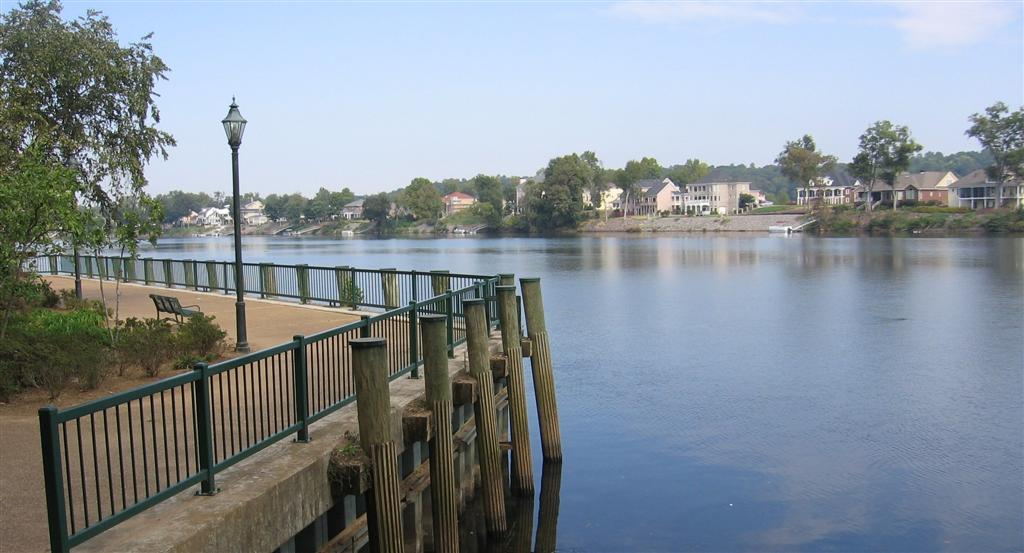
Lower Level of Riverwalk Augusta

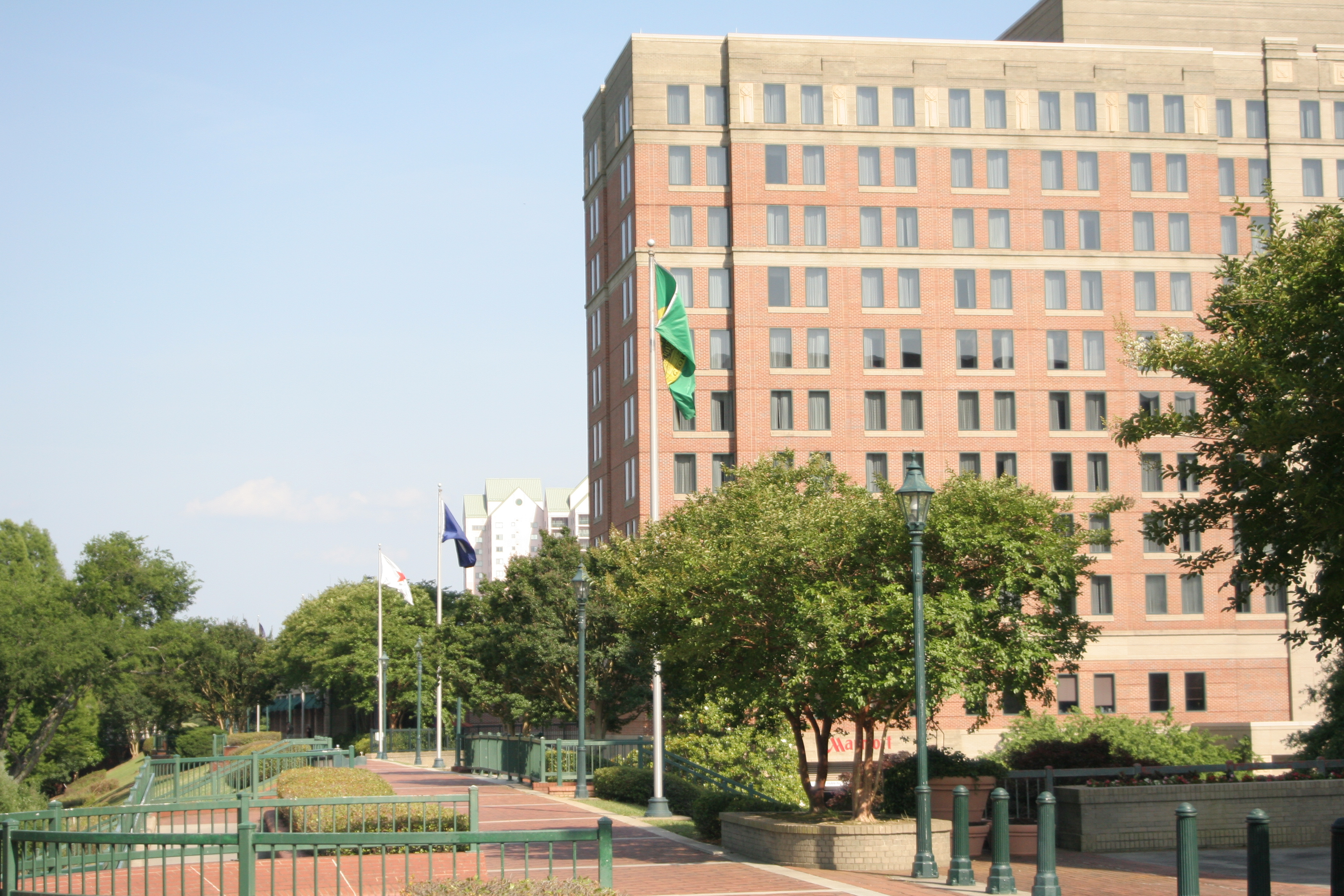
Upper Level of Riverwalk Augusta

Riverwalk Augusta (also known as the Augusta Riverwalk) is a city park along the Savannah River in downtown Augusta, in the U.S. state of Georgia. The park is alongside and on top of Augusta's levee. It extends from the 13th Street Bridge to the Gordon Highway bridge. Sites along the Riverwalk include St. Paul's Episcopal Church, Georgia Cyber Center, and the Morris Museum of Art.

== History ==
Through much of the late 19th century and into the early 20th century, the City of Augusta had been affected by many years of devastating floods that damaged many homes and businesses in Downtown Augusta.

In order to control future flooding events, the City of Augusta constructed a levee along the banks of the Savannah River in Downtown Augusta to protect the city from such flood events.

However, in 1929, the city suffered a heavy flood that topped over the levee structure and breached into Downtown.

Seven years later, the Flood Control Act of 1936 was passed into law which authorized the United States Army Corps of Engineers to construct a new levee along the Savannah River to its current existing level it sits at today.

With a decline in Downtown Augusta in the late 1970s and early 1980s, a new local organization, Augusta Tomorrow, was formed to help develop ways to boost local growth in the Downtown area. The concept was soon formed to develop a Riverwalk that would run along top of the existing levee structure.

After nearly four years of planning and working with state and federal partners for approval, a groundbreaking ceremony was held in February 1986 to kick of the Riverwalk improvements. The plan called for a brick walkway on top of the levee, two bulkheads into the Savannah River, and construction of Oglethorpe Park near the Sixth Street Railroad Bridge.

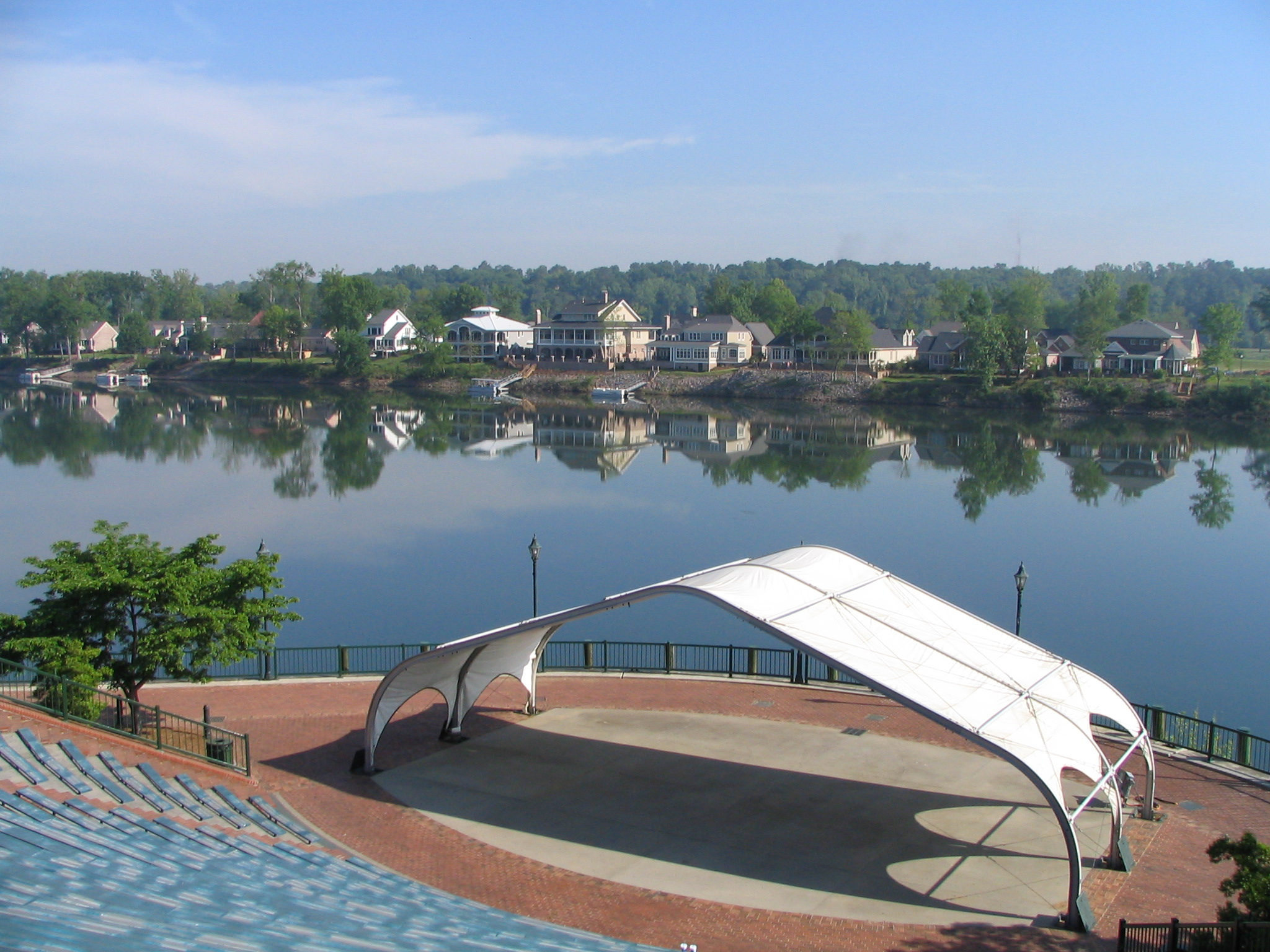
The Jessye Norman Amphitheater of Riverwalk Augusta.

In 1989, a second ceremony was held with the announcement of construction of a new 1,800 seat amphitheater located on Ninth Street which was later named after local Augustan singer Jessye Norman.

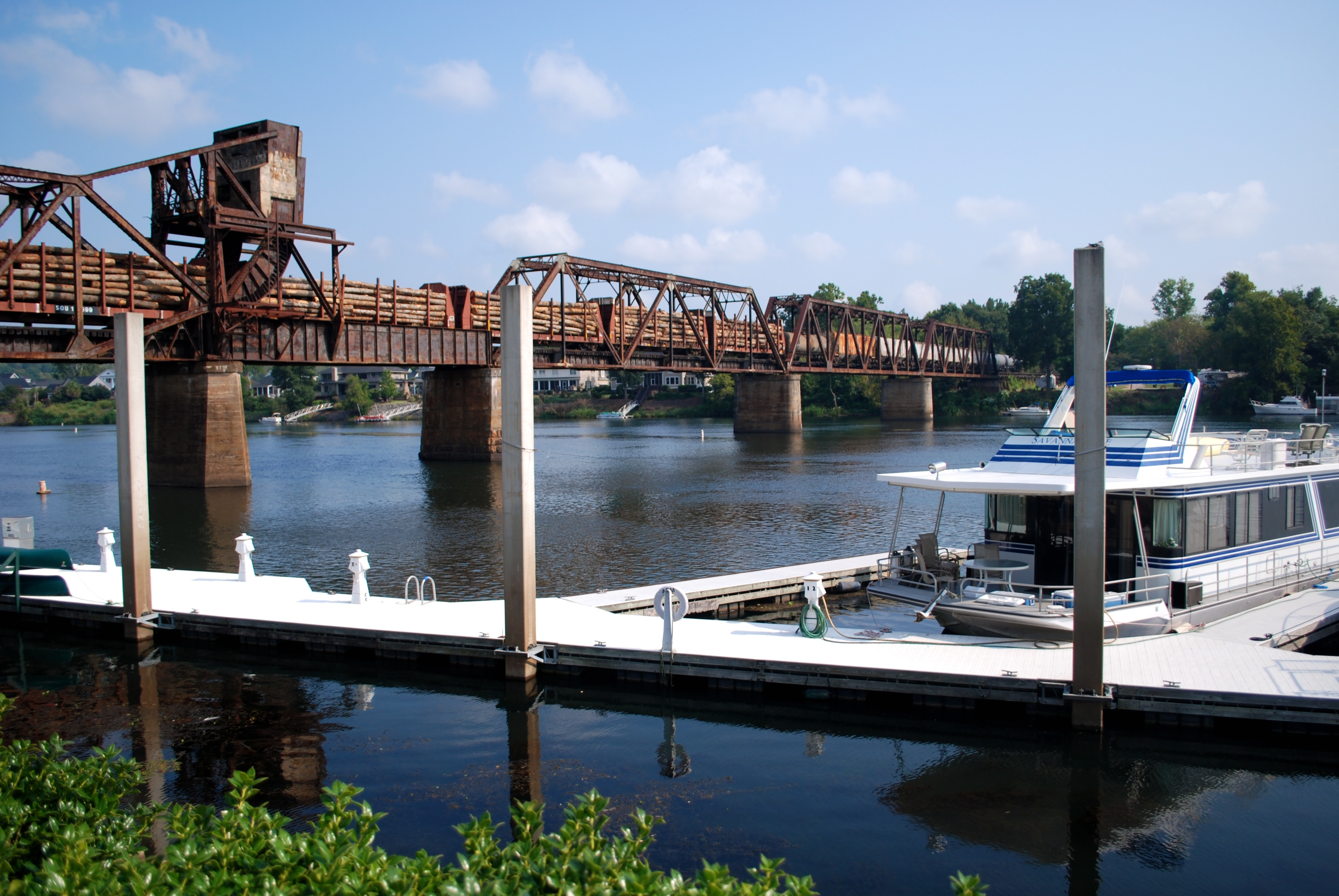
The Fifth Street Marina on Riverwalk Augusta with the Sixth Street Train Trestle in the background.

Over the next three years following that, new developments along Augusta's Riverwalk were constructed which included the Augusta Riverfront Center, Port Royal, the Morris Museum of Art, and the Fifth Street Marina.

Today, the Riverwalk continues to be the site of the Saturday Market on the River - a local farmers market held from April through October. It is also the site of many historical memorials to include markings of previous floods in Augusta, Heroes Overlook which honors Medal of Honor recipients, and a traditional Japanese Garden and Waterfall from Augusta's sister city, Takarazuka, Japan.

== See also ==
- Augusta Downtown Historic District
- Augusta Canal
