= C. T. Walker Traditional Magnet School =

Charles Thomas Walker Traditional Magnet School

Location
- 1301 Wrightsboro Road; Augusta, Georgia; United States; 33°27′48″N 81°59′05″W

Information
- Type: Public Examination School
- Motto: "We can't hide our wildcat pride."
- Established: 1934 (as an elementary school); 1980 (as an Magnet school)
- Founder: Charles Thomas Walker
- School district: Richmond County School System
- Principal: Alfreda Howard
- Teaching staff: 47.00 (FTE)
- Grades: K-5
- Gender: Coeducational
- Enrollment: 730 (2019–20)
- Student to teacher ratio: 15.53
- Campus: Urban
- Colors: Maroon and gold
- Mascot: Wildcat
- Nickname: Wildcats
- Website: https://ctwalker.rcboe.org/

Charles Thomas Walker Traditional Magnet School (C.T. Walker) is a public examination school located in the Laney-Walker district of Augusta, Georgia, United States. It draws students from kindergarten through eighth grade from all parts of the Richmond County School System. It is one of four magnet schools in Richmond County.

== History ==
The school's history dates back to 1934 when it housed grades 1-7. The building was constructed with federal assistance and opened with an enrollment of 1500 students (500 over the building's specifications). When Richmond County schools were integrated in the 1970s, the enrollment of the school decreased to about 500 students. Court-ordered busing was instituted to ensure racial balance in the student population and to remedy fluctuating enrollment patterns.

In 1980, it became a magnet school, housing grades K-5. Like in other magnet schools in the county, racial quotas maintained a racially balanced student body (45% African American, 45% Caucasian, 10% other). The concept brought changes in structural organization. During its first year as a magnet school, C.T. Walker housed 400 K-5 students admitted based on a lottery that was conducted by community leaders and school officials. Beginning with the 1981 school year, the sixth grade was added to the school structure, followed by the seventh grade in 1982, and the eighth grade in 1983. In 1999, the C. T. Walker Magnet School celebrated its twentieth anniversary as a magnet school.

== Awards and recognition ==
- Georgia School of Excellence — 2003
- Recognition as being a "no excuses" school with a 62% percent poverty rate, which is 50% above the state average; statistic published and placed on Georgia's State Report Card for Parents

== See also ==
- Richmond County School System
