= Sacred Heart Cultural Center =

Historic church in Georgia, United States

- Sacred Heart Catholic Church
- U.S. National Register of Historic Places
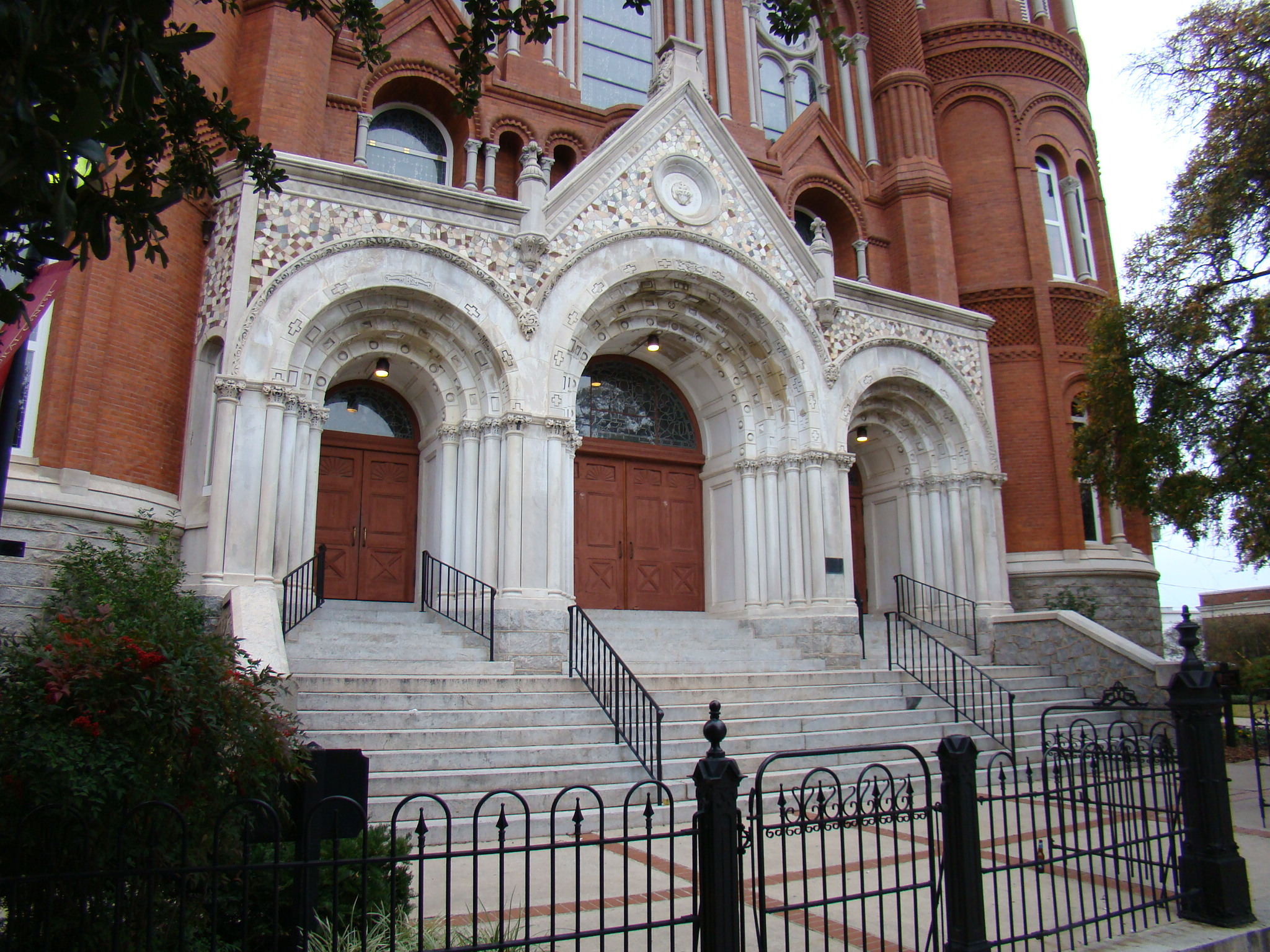
- Sacred Heart Cultural Center

- Location within Georgia Location within the United States
- Location: Greene and 13th Sts., Augusta, Georgia
- Coordinates: 33°28′38″N 81°58′37″W
- Built: 1898
- Architect: Cornelius Otten
- Architectural style: Late Victorian, Romanesque
- NRHP reference No.: 72000399
- Added to NRHP: March 16, 1972

The Sacred Heart Cultural Center, originally known also as Sacred Heart Catholic Church, is a historic events center and former Catholic parish church located in Augusta, Georgia. The church was established to accommodate Augusta's growing Catholic immigrant population, which had outgrown the St. Patrick parish by the 1870s.

== History ==
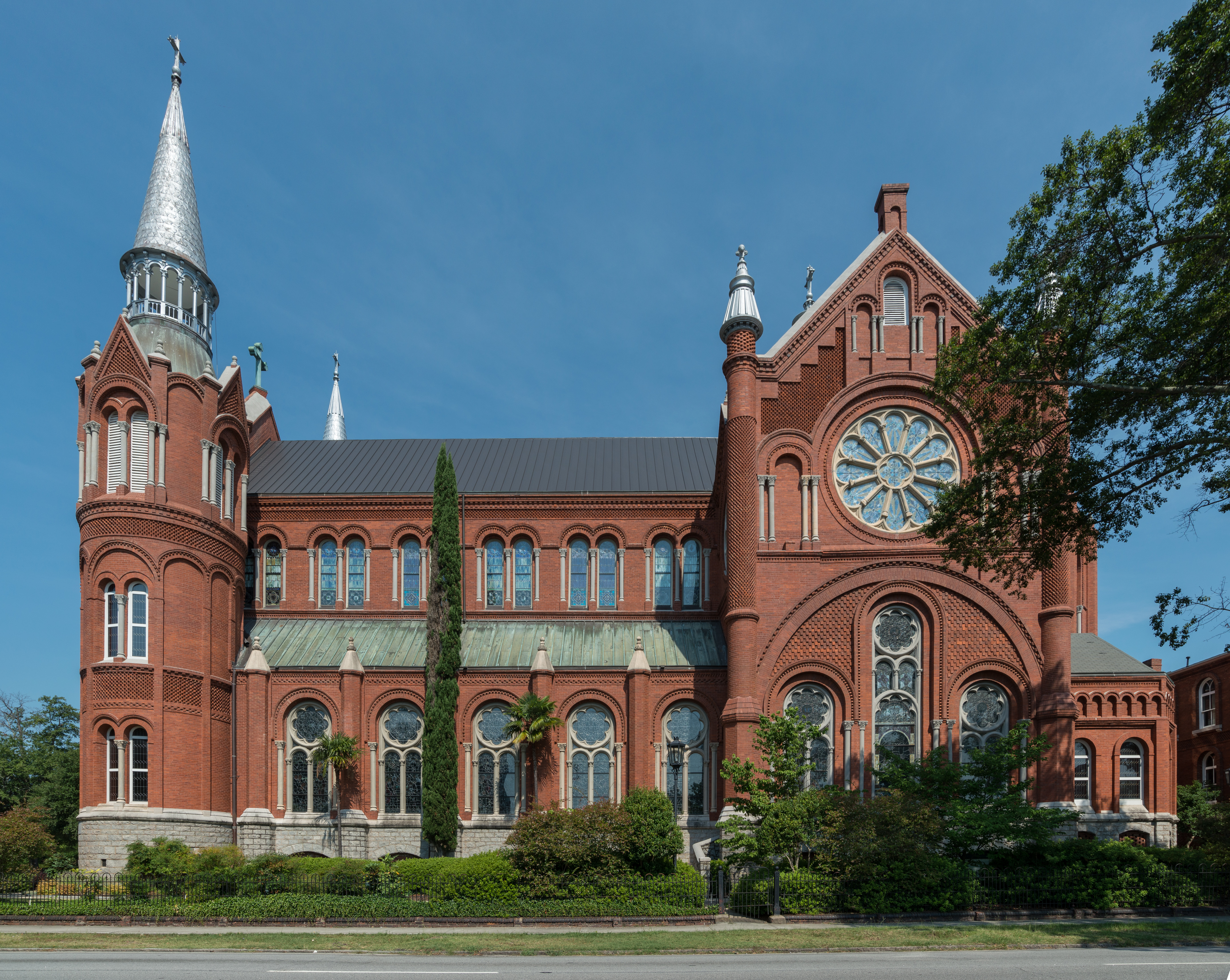
An east view of the building

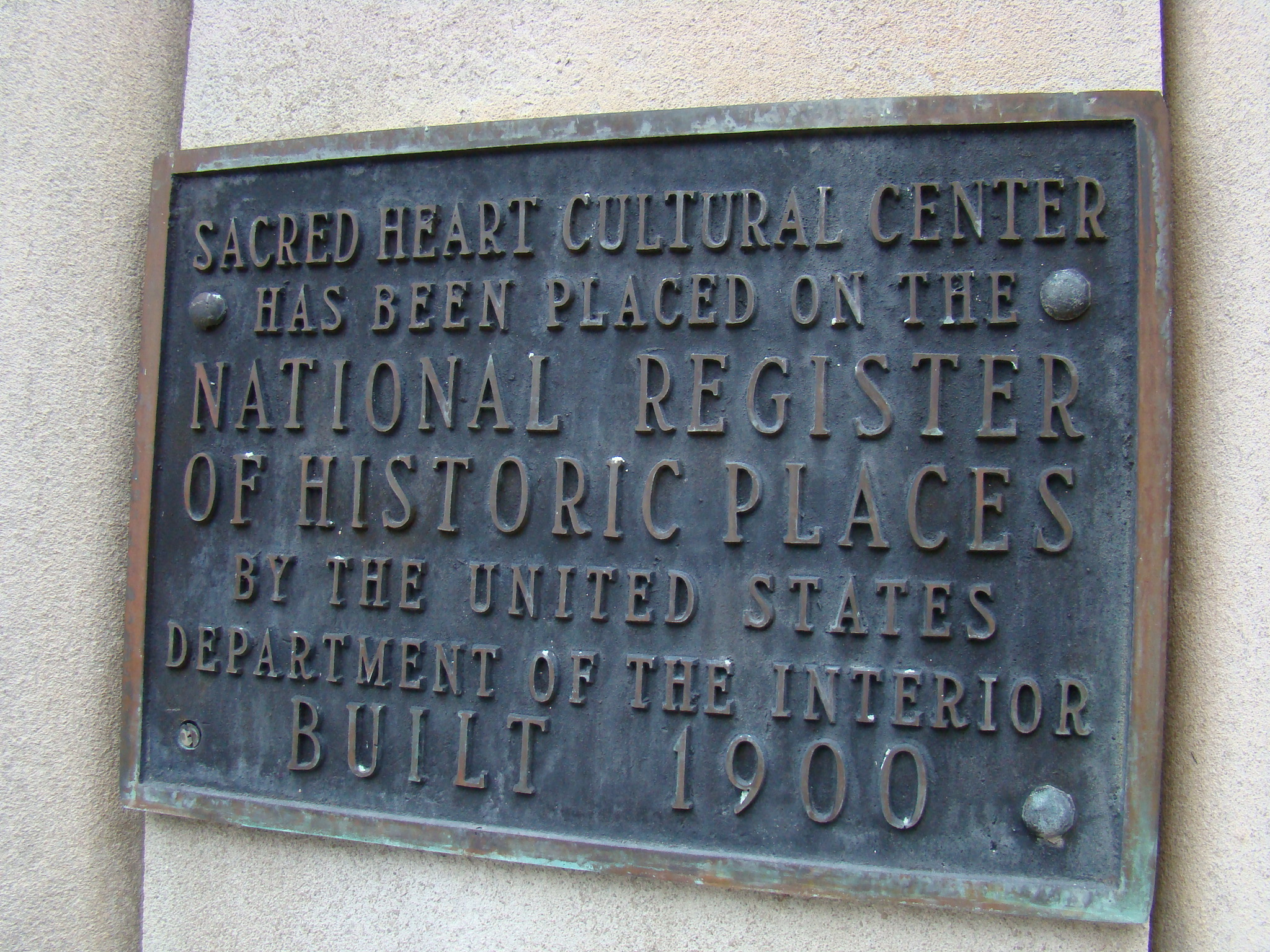
Sacred Heart plaque

In 1874, Father Theodore Bulter acquired land for the new church and a Christian school intended to serve people of all denominations. Initially, temporary structures were built, and Jesuit priests were brought in to lead the new parish. Construction of the permanent church building began in 1897, and the first mass was held on December 2, 1900.

Sacred Heart Catholic Church was designed in a cruciform Romanesque style, with ornate features including an Italian marble high altar in the apse and two side altars in the transept. The walls of the structure were heavily adorned with stained glass from Munich, totaling 94 windows. Six rose windows dominate the ends of transept, and the aisle windows depict various saints and Catholic symbols. The nave features a barrel vault ceiling, and a small dome crowns the crossing of the transept. The facade of the church is distinguished by round towers with conical spires, and three stone arches frame the main entrances. The church is also notable for its intricate brickwork, which includes 15 different types of brick.

The church served the Augusta community for 70 years until it was closed in 1971 due to escalating maintenance costs and a declining population in the surrounding neighborhood. This decline was accelerated by two major floods of the Savannah River and the development of modern suburban, which drew residents away from downtown Augusta. While the building was vacant, it suffered from vandalism and was near destruction.

Sacred Heart was listed on the National Register of Historic Places in 1972.

In 1987, the Knox Foundation undertook a renovation of the building, transforming it into a vibrant cultural center for the city. Today, the former rectory and school building house various non-profit organizations and arts groups.

== Events ==
The Sacred Heart Cultural Center hosts special events such as wine festivals, choral concerts, Christmas events, and an annual garden festival. Artwork is exhibited on a regular basis in the Art Gallery.

== See also ==
- Arts and culture in Augusta, Georgia
