= Piedmont Augusta Summerville Campus =

Coordinates: 33.46605°N 82.01792°W

Piedmont Augusta Summerville
- Piedmont Augusta

Geography
- Location: Augusta, Georgia, United States

Organization
- Care system: Public
- Type: General

Services
- Standards: JCAHO
- Emergency department: No
- Beds: 231

History
- Former names: St. Joseph Hospital (1952-2007); Trinity Hospital (2007-2017); University Hospital Summerville (2017-2022)
- Founded: 1952

Links
- Website: www.piedmont.org/locations/piedmont-augusta-summerville
- Lists: Hospitals in Georgia

Piedmont Augusta Summerville (formerly University Hospital Summerville, Trinity Hospital, and St. Joseph Hospital) was founded in 1952, as a private Roman Catholic tertiary care facility known as St. Joseph Hospital located in Augusta, Georgia. The hospital is known for its comprehensive diagnostic services, including cardiac catheterization, magnetic resonance imaging, and osteoporosis treatment.

== History ==
St. Joseph Hospital was founded in 1952. The hospital had 110 licensed beds at the time. It quickly grew to its present-day size of about 231 licensed beds and became known for pioneering many medical firsts. Among them include cochlear hearing implants, stereotactic mammography, and a unique treatment program for hip and knee replacement.

St. Joseph was sold by its owner, Ascension Health, to Triad Hospitals in 2006. Triad merged with Community Health Systems in 2007. It was then renamed to Trinity Hospital in the same year.

Trinity was sold to University Hospital (Augusta, Georgia) in 2017, to become University Hospital Summerville. After University Hospital rebranded to Piedmont Augusta in 2022, the hospital was renamed to Piedmont Augusta Summerville.

== See also ==
- Medical College of Georgia
- University Hospital (Augusta, Georgia)
- Doctors Hospital (Augusta, Georgia)
