= Richmond County School System =

School district in Augusta, Georgia, U.S.

Address
- 864 Broad Street Augusta, Georgia, 30901-1215; United States
- Coordinates: 33.4757°N 81.9667°W

District information
- Grades: Pre-kindergarten – 12
- Superintendent: Kenneth Bradshaw
- Chair of the board: Charlie Walker Jr.
- Accreditation(s): Southern Association of Colleges and Schools; Georgia Accrediting Commission
- Budget: $375-400M (FY2021)

Students and staff
- Enrollment: 29,589 (2022–23)
- Faculty: 2,136.30 (FTE)
- Student–teacher ratio: 13.85

Other information
- Telephone: (706) 826-1000
- Website: rcboe.org

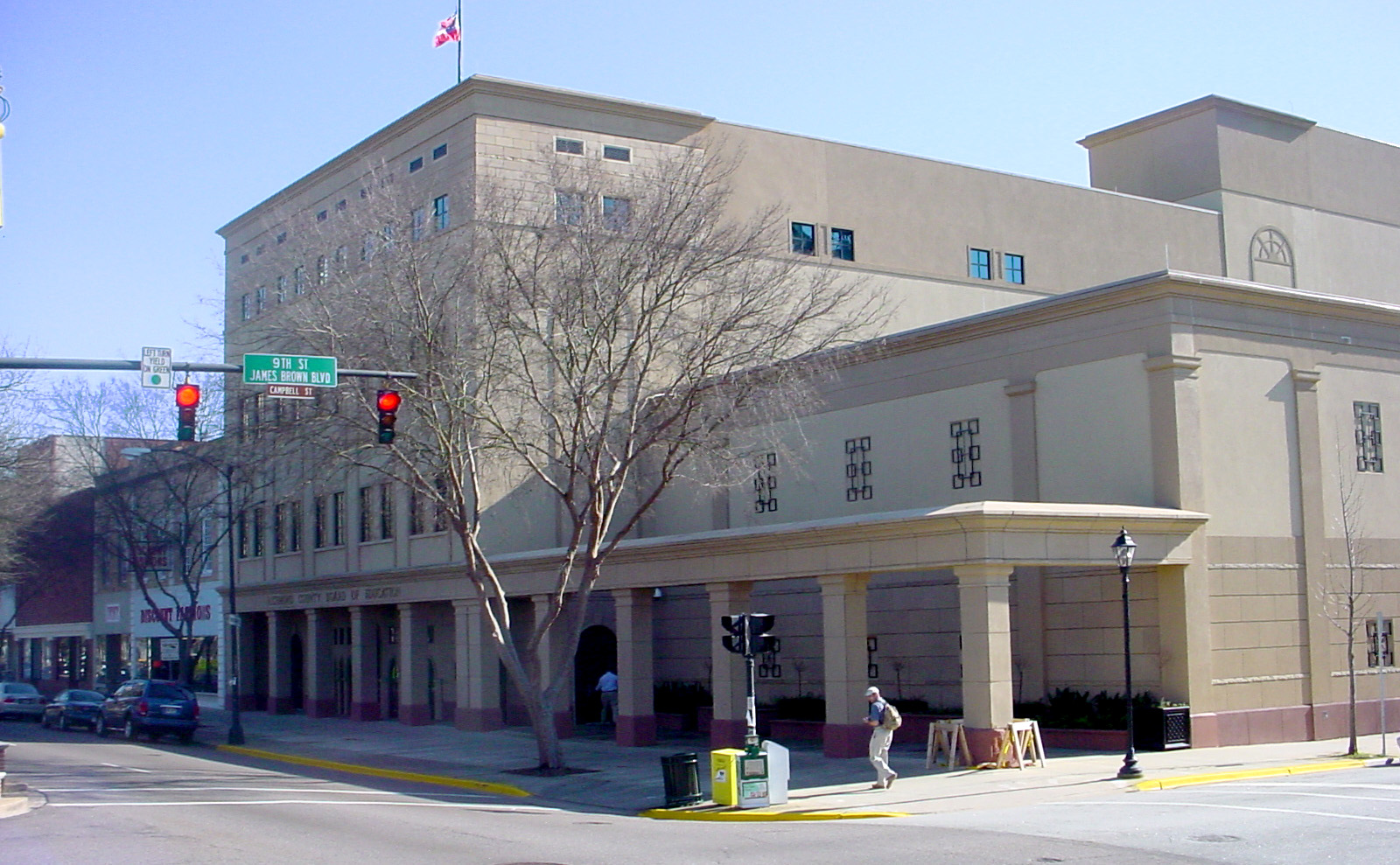
Richmond County Board of Education central office in 2006

The Richmond County School System is an American public school system based in Augusta, Georgia. Its boundary is that of Richmond County.

It is run by the Richmond County Board of Education which, under Article VIII, § V, Paragraph 2, requires that each school system be under the management and control of an elected board of education. As elected Constitutional officials of Georgia, the school board members are responsible for setting educational policies, employing school personnel, providing buildings and equipment, operating a transportation system, and disbursing school funds. The board of education meets in the Richmond County Board of Education building at 864 Broad Street in Augusta. It serves consolidated Augusta-Richmond County, Georgia, and the south Richmond County cities of Hephzibah and Blythe. The system has an enrollment of around 32,000 students, attending 36 elementary schools, 10 middle schools, 8 high schools, 4 magnet schools, and 3 other schools. The school board has its own police department which provides law enforcement services to all the district's schools.

The Richmond County School System is in the third phase of a construction program that will renovate older schools and add new schools, particularly for its magnet program. This will include a fine arts elementary magnet school, a vocational magnet school, and second magnet traditional elementary school.

== Schools ==
=== Elementary schools ===
- Barton Chapel Elementary School
- Bayvale Elementary School
- Belair Elementary School
- Blythe Elementary School
- Copeland Elementary School
- Deer Chase Elementary School
- Diamond Lakes Elementary School
- Garrett Elementary School
- Glenn Hills Elementary School
- Goshen Elementary School
- Gracewood Elementary School
- Hains Elementary School
- Hephzibah Elementary School
- Hornsby K-8 School
- Jamestown Elementary School
- Jenkins-White Elementary School
- Lake Forest Hills Elementary School
- Lamar-Millege Elementary School
- McBean Elementary School
- Meadowbrook Elementary School
- Monte Sano Elementary School
- Richmond Hill K-8
- Sue Reynolds Elementary School
- Terrace Manor Elementary School
- Tobacco Road Elementary School
- Warren Road Elementary School
- Wheeless Road Elementary School
- Wilkinson Gardens Elementary School
- Willis Foreman Elementary School

=== K-8 ===
- Freedom Park K-8 School

=== Middle schools ===
- Freedom Park K-8 School
- Glenn Hills Middle School
- Hephzibah Middle School
- Hornsby Middle School
- Langford Middle School
- Murphey Middle School
- Pine Hill Middle School
- Richmond Hill K-8 School
- Spirit Creek Middle School
- Tutt Middle School

=== High schools ===
- Academy of Richmond County
- Cross Creek High School
- George P. Butler High School
- Glenn Hills High School
- Hephzibah High School
- Lucy Craft Laney High School
- T. W. Josey High School
- Westside High School

=== Magnet schools ===
- A. R. Johnson Health Science and Engineering Magnet High School
- C. T. Walker Traditional Magnet School
- John S. Davidson Fine Arts Magnet School
- Richmond County Technical Career Magnet School

=== Other schools ===
- Alternative School at Morgan Road
- Sand Hills Program
- Cyber Academy of Excellence
- eSchool
- Marion E. Barnes Career Center
- Reaching Maximum Potential through Manufacturing
- Performance Learning Center

== See also ==
- Georgia Department of Education
- Cumming v. Richmond County Board of Education (1899)
