= Walton Rehabilitation Hospital =

Coordinates: 33.47486°N 81.98023°W

Rehabilitation Hospital of Augusta
- Encompass Health

Geography
- Location: Augusta, Georgia, United States

History
- Opened: 1988

Links
- Website: encompasshealth.com/locations/augustarehab
- Lists: Hospitals in Georgia

Rehabilitation Hospital of Augusta is a non-profit rehabilitation center located in Augusta, Georgia, United States which has won numerous awards for the quality of its healthcare. The hospital was founded in 1988 and is one component of the Walton Rehabilitation Health System. This hospital offers both inpatient and outpatient programs to teens and adults and assesses disabling illnesses, stroke, head injuries, spinal injuries, and orthopedic injuries. Rehabilitation Hospital of Augusta is the only specialized provider of rehabilitation in the Central Savannah River Area of Georgia. Its published mission is to "enhance the quality of life for people with acquired disabilities."

Rehabilitation Hospital of Augusta cares for more stroke patients than any other hospital in Georgia each year. Transitional living services help brain injury patients transition from inpatient rehab, and help prepare them for readjusting to home life. The focus is on helping patients regain their movement, function, and independence.

More than 50% of the hospital's nurses are CRRN-certified. Each physician is either board-certified and/or fellowship-trained. In addition to rehabilitation services, Rehabilitation Hospital of Augusta offers behavioral medicine services.

== Location and design ==
The hospital is located on the border of Georgia and South Carolina. Other medical facilities in the area include the Medical College of Georgia, University Health System, and Augusta VA Medical Center.

Rehabilitation Hospital of Augusta is a single-story facility to help accommodate patients with physical disabilities and rehab patients.

== Accreditations and awards ==
The hospital is accredited by the Joint Commission and the Commission of Accreditation of Rehabilitation Facilities, as well as special accreditation for stroke rehabilitation. In 2002, Rehabilitation Hospital of Augusta received the Georgia Hospital Association Community Leadership Award. The following year, Rehabilitation Hospital of Augusta received the Magnolia Award for Excellence. In 2007, Rehabilitation Hospital of Augusta received the NAHMA's Communities of Quality awards for the Development for the Elderly and the Development for Residents with Special Needs.

== Hospital stats ==
- Accepts Medicare and/or Medicaid
- Accreditation: JCAHO
- Total certified beds: 58
