= Piedmont Augusta =

- Piedmont Augusta

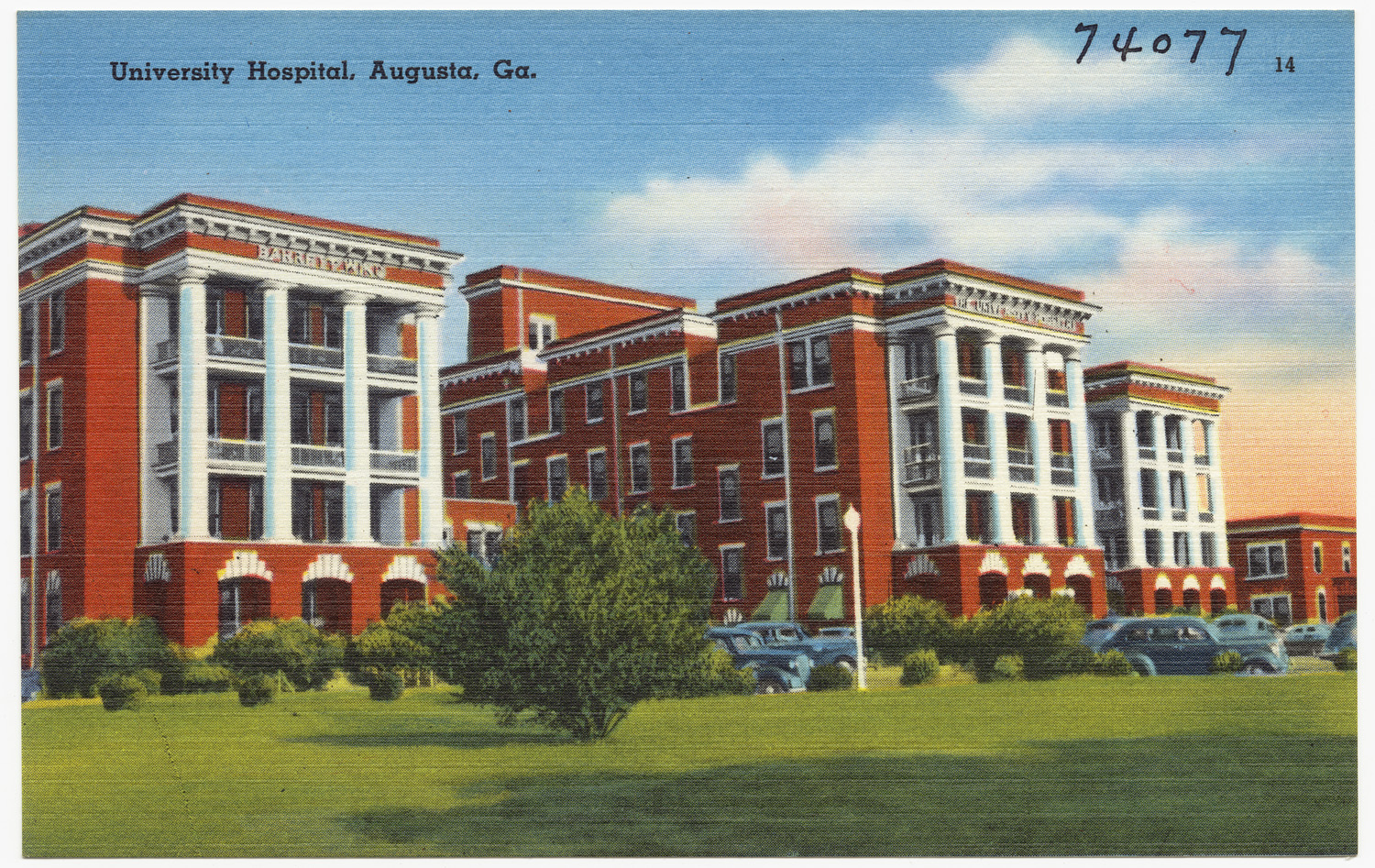

Geography
- Location: Augusta, Richmond County, Georgia, United States
- Coordinates: 33.473°N 81.982°W

Organization
- Care system: Non-profit
- Type: private

Services
- Beds: 581

History
- Founded: 1818

Links
- Website: www.universityhealth.org
- Lists: Hospitals in Georgia

Piedmont Augusta, formerly University Hospital, is a non-profit private hospital located in downtown Augusta, Georgia.

In addition to its main hospital campus, Piedmont Augusta has outpatient medical offices and imaging centers servicing the surrounding 20-county region comprising the Central Savannah River Area. Piedmont Augusta provides prompt care, primary care, and specialty physicians such as Endocrinology, Neuroscience, Heart and Vascular, Rheumatology and Gastroenterology. A 25-bed medical center located in McDuffie County has been added recently.

In 2021, it was announced that Piedmont Healthcare was going to take over University Hospital, and the hospital officially became Piedmont Augusta on March 1, 2022.

== Accreditation ==
Piedmont Augusta is accredited by DNV, a global certification body with objectives to safeguard life, property and the environment.

== History ==
A poor house and hospital was built on the 100 block of Greene Street in 1818. The first City Hospital provided local physicians an opportunity for medical education and became the first home of the Medical College of Georgia in 1829. While City Hospital generally served white patients, a Freedman's Hospital was opened to care for the many African-Americans who migrated to Augusta following the American Civil War.

Augusta's City and Lamar hospitals (replacing Freedman's) operated under the auspices of local government, with medical and surgical control provided by the medical college faculty. Nursing education was started at both hospitals in the 1890s, which would later evolve into the University Hospital School of Nursing.

City and Lamar hospitals were brought under one facility with the opening of a replacement hospital in 1915, which was named "University Hospital" in recognition of the ongoing clinical association with the medical college. Having Barrett, Lamar and later Milton Antony and Jennings wings, the first University Hospital served Augusta's citizens for 55 years.

Political upheaval caused the medical college to construct its own teaching facility, which opened as Talmadge Hospital in the 1950s. The Richmond County Hospital Authority moved to replace the aging University wings with a modern hospital, complete with coronary care and intensive care units, which opened in 1970.

In 2017, University Hospital purchased Trinity Hospital, gaining a second campus now known as Piedmont Augusta Summerville Campus, in the historic Summerville community.

In 2021, it was announced that Piedmont Healthcare in Atlanta would be partnering with University Hospital and the hospital officially became Piedmont Augusta on March 1, 2022.

== See also ==
- List of the oldest hospitals in the United States
- List of hospitals in Georgia (U.S. state)
