= Savannah Shamrocks RFC =

US rugby union club, based in Savannah, GA

Savannah Shamrocks Rugby Club
- Union: USA Rugby, Georgia Rugby Union, Division III
- Founded: 1978; 48 years ago
- Ground(s): Forsyth Park, Savannah, GA
- President: (United States) Matthew Midgett
- Coach: (United States) Matthew Midgett (Men's Team) (United States) Kate Lyker (Women's Team)
- Captain(s): (United States) Liam Globensky (Men's Team) (United States) Tara Barrett (Women's Team)
- League: Georgia Rugby Union

Official website
- www.rugbysavannah.com

The Savannah Shamrocks Rugby Club is a rugby union team from Savannah, Georgia and member of USA Rugby and Division III of the Carolinas Geographical Union.

== History ==
The Savannah Shamrocks Rugby Club was formed in 1978 in Savannah by Tom Nelson and Carl Shoemaker, who were looking for something “different;” now the team has up to 50 members, a senior men's and women's team, plays around the region, belongs to the Georgia Rugby Union and hosts the popular St. Patrick's Day Tournament. The team colors are kelly green and gold. The home fields for matches are Forsyth Park and Daffin Park.

=== Men's team ===
==== 2013–present ====
2013 saw new leadership at captain and during this year the Shamrocks club finished 4–2 in the Georgia Rugby Union Division 3 competition and were eliminated in the GRU play-in game with a loss to Charleston. Savannah finished the 2013 season with a 4–3 record.

The 2013-14 season was one of the most successful campaigns in club history. The team opened with a 4–0 run in the Black Rose Tournament, hosted by Georgia Southern University, and claiming the Championship. Savannah ran through the GRU Division 3 league season with an 11–0 regular season record, defeating opponents from Armstrong Atlantic University, Golden Isles, Hilton Head, Valdosta State University, North Atlanta Rugby Club, High Country, Athens and Atlanta Renegades. The Shamrocks hosted the GRU Division 3 Championship and defeated the Athens Eagles. Savannah's season ended in the South Regionals with a loss to Gainesville, Florida, and a final record of 12–1.

In 2015, the Shamrocks completed their second consecutive undefeated GRU regular season with a 9–0 record, defeating Atlanta Old White, Augusta, Gwinnett, Hilton Head, North Atlanta, Athens, G.R.I.T.S., High Country and Macon. Along the way the club participated in St. Patrick's Day Tournament and took 2nd place in Division 2 and in doing so defeated the Atlanta Renegades, making it a clean sweep of all opponents located within the state of Georgia. Savannah took a forfeit victory in the GRU Semi-Final matchup to set up the GRU Championship Game with the Athens Eagles for the second consecutive year. Savannah defeated Athens 29–24 to complete their second consecutive undefeated GRU season and capture the second straight GRU title. In the South Regionals, hosted in Augusta, Georgia, Savannah took on the #1 seed, Clinch River (VA), champions of the True South Region. Savannah defeated their opponent 38–5 to move into the South Championship game and rematch with last year's spoilers, Gainesville (FL). The Shamrocks had lost three consecutive matches to Gainesville, counting their South Semi-Final loss in 2014, but avenged these losses by defeating the Hogs 27–5 and earn a spot in the National Elite 8 in Charlotte, NC. Savannah's 2015 season ended with a loss to Old Gaelic (PA) by a score of 24–33. Savannah also fell in the consolation match-up with Danbury (CT) by a score 27–38. The Shamrocks finished the 2015 season with a 13–2 record and tied for 7th place in the United States in Division III.

In 2016 the Savannah Shamrocks entered the GRU season as heavy favorites and high expectations for the year based on their past two competitive seasons. The Shamrocks completed an unprecedented third straight undefeated GRU regular season with a 9–0 record, defeating Atlanta Old White, Augusta, Columbus, Hilton Head, North Atlanta, Athens, High Country, Gwinnett, and Macon by an average margin of 64–5. Savannah once again participated in the St. Patrick's Day Tournament in the middle of their competitive season; however, this time in the Premier Division, and defeated Chicago Blaze and losing in the semi-final to the USA Rugby South All-Star team by a score of 0–8. Savannah beat the Augusta Maddogs in the GRU Championship game by a score of 62–7 to capture their third consecutive GRU title. In the South Regionals, hosted in Montgomery, Alabama, the Shamrocks came from behind at halftime to defeat the Montgomery Yellowhammers 33–21 to advance to their second straight South Championship game. Savannah squared off with Southern Pines, the Carolina Champion, in the South Championship game and roared out to a huge lead and were able to hang on to that lead in the second half, winning by a score of 53–26 and advance to the National Elite 8 in Pittsburgh, PA. Savannah's season ended with a 17–36 loss to Bremer County (Iowa). In the consolation match, the Shamrocks beat Rocky Gorge 77–0 to secure Savannah a 5th-place finish in the United States in Division III, surpassing their 2015 finish and setting a new club's best finish nationally.

The 2017 season saw the Savannah Shamrocks enter a rebuilding year with player-coach Scott "Boston" Lucas having moved to Florida and player-coach Matthew Midgett taking over the coaching duties. The Shamrocks once again claimed the top spot in the regular season standings by going 9–1 in the regular season with wins over Macon, Atlanta Old White, Augusta, Columbus, Athens, Gwinnett, North Atlanta, High Country, and the Atlanta Bucks while falling only once on the road to the Atlanta Renegades. Savannah hosted High Country in the semi-final matchup which they won 41–24. Savannah faced the Atlanta Renegades in the GRU Championship game with a chance to avenge their only regular season loss, but came up 3 points short in a 26–29 loss.

In 2018 the Savannah Shamrocks went 11–1 in Georgia Rugby Union (GRU) and for the 5th straight year appeared in the GRU Championship game, losing a heartbreaker in overtime to Augusta. The Savannah Shamrocks also went 3–0 in the St. Patrick's Day Tournament, capturing the Division 2 Championship. Savannah went 10–0 in the regular season. The semi-final was a rematch of one of their closest regular season contests with the Atlanta Renegades. Savannah outlasted the Renegades in overtime setting up a GRU Championship game with Augusta. Savannah fell in overtime to Augusta in the championship match.

In 2019, Matthew Midgett moved from player-coach to the team's head coach and promoted Liam Globensky to team captain. Several new players joined the club throughout the season and helped bolster the club's depth as they returned to form by going undefeated in the regular season (5–0) and defeating the Augusta Maddogs in a rematch of the 2018 GRU Championship game by a score of 54–12. During the regular season, Savannah also played in the Premier Division of the St. Patrick's Day Tournament and faced off with three Division 1 clubs and came out 2–1 with wins over Cincinnati and Columbus, while dropping a close match to Detroit, coming away with a 4th-place finish in the Tournament. For the first time in club history the Savannah Shamrocks hosted the South Regional Tournament for competition in Men's Division 2 & 3 as well as Women's Division 2 rugby. The Shamrocks took advantage of the home-field advantage by defeating the Palm Beach Panthers in the South Semi-Finals by a score of 17–3. The following day Savannah beat the Asheville Iguanas 26–10 to claim the South Championship and return to the National Elite 8 for the third time in six years. The Shamrocks season ended against a tough Grand Rapids (MI) team by a score of 21–29. In the consolation game, Savannah faced off against the 2018 National Runner-Up, Long Island, and were defeated to close the season with a 9–2 record and a #7 finish in Division 3 of the United States. Of note during the season, Liam Globensky would break the club's single-season scoring record by tallying 139 points.

== The St. Patrick Day’s tournament ==
St. Patrick's Day Rugby Tournament in Savannah is one of the largest in the country; every year the tournament has over 75 teams from Michigan, Maryland, Florida, Georgia, New York, New Jersey, Ohio, West Virginia as well as teams from Canada, England and Ireland. The St. Patrick's Day Tournament is held in Daffin Park, Savannah, Georgia.

The Savannah Shamrocks have given a portion of the proceeds from the annual event to local charities and individuals in the Savannah and rugby communities for the past 15 years. They also host their own float in the annual St. Patrick's Day Parade, the nation's second-largest St Patrick's Day celebration.

The tournament Grand Champions are:

- 1979 - University of Georgia
- 1980 - Atlanta High Country
- 1981 - Jacksonville
- 1982 - Mystic River Club University of Maryland
- 1983 - Xavier Old Boys
- 1984 - Life College
- 1985 - Augusta
- 1986 - Cincinnati Marmots
- 1987 - Pelicans (St. Petersburg)
- 1988 - Augusta
- 1989 - Old White (Atlanta)
- 1990 - Life College
- 1991 - Bergan
- 1992 - Rock'n'Roll Rebels Ottawa, Canada
- 1993 - Rock'n'Roll Rebels Ottawa, Canada
- 1994 - Maryland Exiles
- 1995 - New York Rugby Club
- 1996 - BAT'S Boston Area Touring Side
- 1997 - Northern Virginia
- 1998 - Northern Virginia
- 1999 - New York Athletic Club
- 2000 - New York Athletic Club
- 2001 - White Plains New York
- 2002 - Unpossible XV
- 2003 - Atlanta Renegades
- 2004 - Cincinnati Wolfhounds
- 2005 - Worcester RFC
- 2006 - Air Force
- 2007 - The Willing
- 2008 - The Willing
- 2009 - The Willing
- 2010 - The Willing
- 2011 - Cincinnati
- 2012 - Air Force
- 2013 - Cincinnati Wolfhounds
- 2014 - USA Rugby South Panthers
- 2015 - Cincinnati Wolfhounds
- 2016 - Cleveland Crusaders
- 2017 - Life University
- 2018 - Life
- 2019 - Life

== Opponents ==
Athens
Atlanta Old White
Atlanta Renegades
Golden Isles
High Country
Hilton Head
Jacksonville
Macon

== Sponsorship ==
Primary

- Murphy's Law
- Guinness

Secondary

- The Black Ledge Group
- STATS Tours
- B&D Burgers
