= Augusta Botanical Gardens =

Coordinates: 33°28′12″N 81°58′30″W

- Georgia Golf Hall of Fame Botanical Gardens
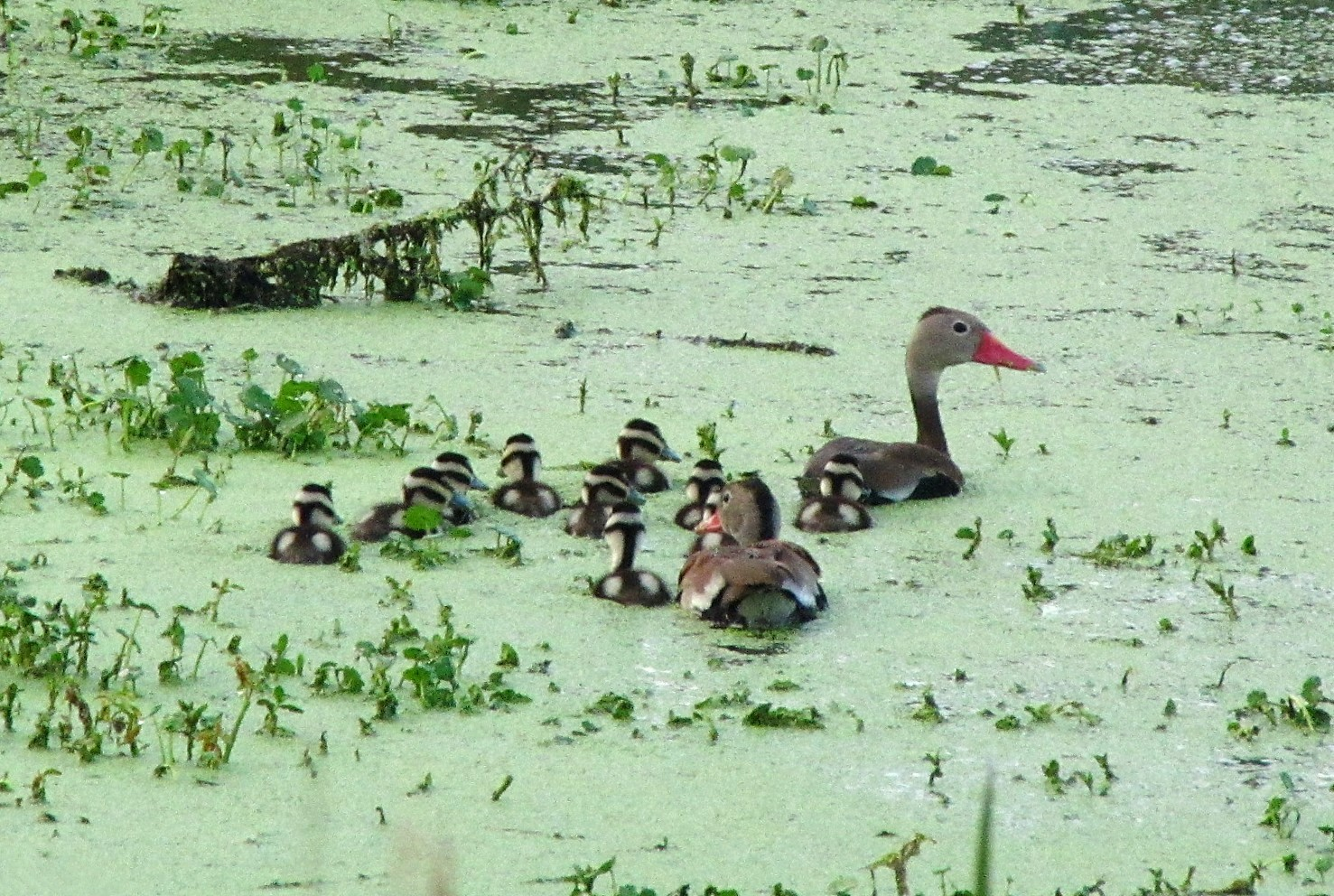
- Duck family in the former Augusta Botanical Gardens
- Interactive map of Augusta Botanical Gardens
- Location: Augusta, Georgia
- Area: 17 acres (6.9 ha)
- Authorized: January 1999
- Closed: June 30, 2007
- Status: Closed

The Augusta Botanical Gardens (formerly the Georgia Golf Hall of Fame Botanical Gardens) was a 17-acre (69,000 m^{2}) botanical garden located in downtown Augusta, Georgia. The gardens were opened to the public in March 2001.

Until July 2007, it contained display gardens (8 acres (32,000 m^{2})) along the banks of the Savannah River, and include a rose garden with over 800 miniature rose varieties, as well as sculptures of famous golfers Raymond Floyd, Ben Hogan, Bobby Jones, Byron Nelson, Jack Nicklaus, and Arnold Palmer.

Because of financial problems, the Georgia Golf Hall of Fame closed the gardens in June 2007. Most of the plants died because they were not watered. On September 6, 2007, the sculptures were removed and placed in a maintenance shed on the property.

On June 6, 2009, after a well-publicized eight-day battle with state agencies, the Georgia Golf Hall of Fame allowed a group of two dozen citizens to enter the property to cut the grass. Residents of Augusta and the surrounding areas continued to maintain parts of the property for free, even though the Georgia Golf Hall of Fame would not allow them to use the property except to maintain it.

In 2010, several of the golf statues were acquired by the Augusta Museum of Memory and the property was offered for sale.

In 2012, the property was transferred to Augusta University. In 2016, the university began to redevelop the property.

The site has now been developed as the home of the Georgia Cyber Center, a two building office complex which is host to multiple cybersecurity companies as well as cybersecurity and information technology programs at Augusta University and Augusta Technical College.
