= Georgia Cyber Innovation and Training Center =

Georgia Cyber Center building in downtown Augusta, Georgia

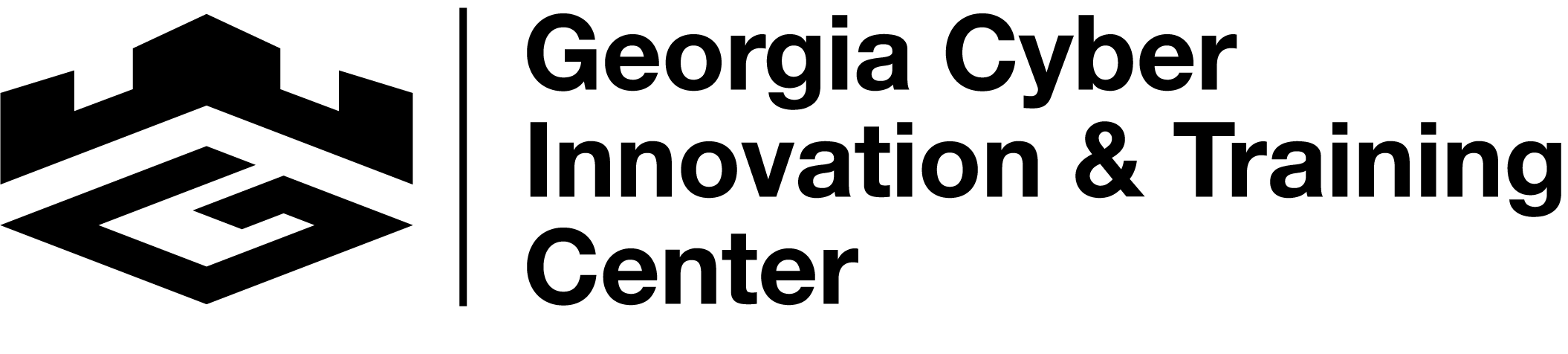

- The Shaffer MacCartney (front) and Hull McKnight (rear) buildings by the Savannah River
- Interactive map of the Georgia Cyber Innovation and Training Center area
- Alternative names: Georgia Cyber Center

General information
- Location: 100 Grace Hopper Lane; Augusta, Georgia, United States
- Coordinates: 33°28′47.59″N 81°58′12.67″W
- Groundbreaking: January 3, 2018
- Opened: July 10, 2018

Website
- https://www.gacybercenter.org/

The Georgia Cyber Innovation and Training Center (GCITC), also known as the Georgia Cyber Center (GCC), is a 337,000 square foot office complex comprising two buildings in downtown Augusta, Georgia, as part of the Nathan Deal Campus of Innovation on Augusta University Riverfront Campus. Built on the former Augusta Botanical Gardens site, groundbreaking began in early 2018. The Hull McKnight building first opened on July 10, 2018. The Shaffer MacCartney building opened later on January 10, 2019.

The complex’s tenants include academic, government, and private-sector partners. Primary academic partners consist of the Augusta University School of Computer and Cyber Sciences and the Augusta Technical College School of Cyber and Design Media. State and federal agencies on-site include the Georgia Bureau of Investigation’s Cyber Crime Unit, the National Cyber Range, the Cyber Fusion Innovation Center (CFIC), and the Test Resource Management Center (TRMC).

Private industry partners include Parsons, Booz Allen, Leidos, Peraton (which acquired former tenant Perspecta), Athenix Solutions Group, ECS, Scientific Research Corporation, Sealing Tech, and Todyl. Other organizations located at the center include the National Wild Turkey Federation and The Alliance for Fort Gordon. The facility continues to complement the United States Army Cyber Command at nearby Fort Gordon and the Savannah River National Laboratory in Aiken, South Carolina.

A third, 250,000 square foot, 10-floor building has been planned to provide more research capacity with Augusta University as the anchor tenant. However, no construction timeline has been set.

== History ==
On January 12, 2017, Georgia governor Nathan Deal announced $50 million, later increased to $60 million, in funding to establish the Georgia Cyber Center to promote cybersecurity research and collaboration among academic institutions, private industries, and governments. The Hull McKnight building, named after local businessmen James M. Hull and William D. McKnight, is a 167,000 square foot facility intended for academic spaces.

On November 27, 2017, Governor Deal announced an additional $35 million in funding to build a second, 165,000 square foot facility, the Shaffer MacCartney building. Groundbreaking took place on January 3, 2018. The building is named in recognition of Michael Shaffer, who served as Augusta University’s Executive Vice President for Strategic Partnerships and Economic Development, and Teresa MacCartney, who held the position of Chief Financial Officer and Director of the Governor’s Office of Planning and Budget for the State of Georgia, for their roles in establishing the center.
