= Virginia Cyber Range =

Coordinates: 37.2002°N 80.4104°W

- Parent institution: Virginia Polytechnic Institute and State University
- Established: 2016
- Mission: Making Virginia a national resource for cybersecurity education
- Focus: Cybersecurity education
- Location: Blacksburg, Virginia, United States
- Website: https://virginiacyberrange.org/

The Virginia Cyber Range is an educational and research institute funded by a $4-million grant from the Commonwealth of Virginia to promote education in cybersecurity across the state. Currently, the Cyber Range is based out of the Virginia Tech Corporate Research Center.

== History ==
The idea of a cyber range for education in cybersecurity in Virginia was first proposed by Governor Terry McAuliffe in late 2015. The 2017 - 2018 Commonwealth of Virginia Biennial Budget provided initial funding for the Virginia Cyber Range. Specifically, $4 million over two years was "designated to support a cyber range platform to be used for cyber security training by students in Virginia's public high schools, community colleges, and four-year institutions," with Virginia Tech identified as the lead agency for the cyber range platform.

The Virginia Cyber Range was initially funded on July 1, 2016, with David Raymond selected as the Director. Dr. Raymond stepped down as director in October of 2024, and Shannon Beck was later appointed as the Director of the range on July 14, 2025. She previously served as an associate professor in the Department of Computer and Cyber Sciences at the United States Air Force Academy and has held leadership roles at the National Science Foundation, Los Alamos National Laboratory, and TeachCyber.org. In February 2017, named Amazon Web Services as a primary partner in the design of the Cyber Range.

As of early 2019, the Cyber Range supports over 200 high schools, colleges, and universities in Virginia with infrastructure and courseware for cybersecurity classes and clubs. It also supports the annual Virginia CyberFusion Cyber Cup competition. The Virginia Cyber Range hosted the Inaugural Virginia Cybersecurity Education Conference at James Madison University in August 2018. The second annual Virginia Cybersecurity Education Conference took place on George Mason University's Fairfax campus in August 2019. In July 2019, the Cyber Range expanded its services beyond the Commonwealth of Virginia by launching the US Cyber Range. This courseware is offered as a service center of Virginia Tech.

== See also ==
- National Cyber Range Complex, operated by the United States Department of Defense
