= Cyber range =

Virtual environment used for cybersecurity

A cyber range is a virtual environment used for computer security, cyberwarfare training, simulation or emulation, and development of technologies related to cybersecurity. Their scale can vary drastically, from just a single node to an internet-like network.

== See also ==
- List of cyber ranges
- National Cyber Range
