= Augusta Rugby Football Club =

(United States) Augusta Mad Dogs
- Full name: Augusta Rugby Football Club
- Union: USA Rugby
- Nickname: Mad Dogs
- Founded: 1973
- Ground: Larry Bray Memorial
- President: Matt Keck
- Coach: Pete Redmond
- League: USA Rugby South Division 3

Official website
- www.augustarugby.org

The Augusta Rugby Football Club (ARFC) is a rugby union club in the Central Savannah River Area, Georgia in the United States. The club competes in USA Rugby South's third division.

== History ==
ARFC was founded in 1973 by Jim "Jim Rugby" Macmillan and Danny Ferguson. Both ruggers had previously played rugby during their undergraduate college years. The pair were classmates at the Medical College of Georgia and started the team to serve as a much needed distraction for their fellow medical students. Thus, the MCG Mad Dogs were born -- "Mad Dogs" being derived from the abbreviation for "Medical Doctor" (MD).

The team has played on several fields over the years, converting football, soccer, softball and polo fields to passable rugby pitches. Ultimately, ARFC finalized an agreement with the city of Augusta, Georgia to lease unused property near downtown Augusta which led to the construction of Larry Bray Memorial Pitch, named after the late long-time "old boy" Larry Bray. The inaugural match was played on September 19, 2009, against Jacksonville Rugby with Augusta pulling out the win in the closing minutes of a very exciting match.
