= Atlanta Renegades =

US rugby union club, based in Atlanta, GA

(United States) Renegades RFC
- Full name: Atlanta Renegades Rugby Football Club
- Union: USA Rugby
- Founded: 1971; 55 years ago
- Location: Atlanta, Georgia
- Ground: Atlanta Silverbacks Park (Capacity: 5,000)
- President: Eric Rogers
- Coach(es): Randy Joseph, Bob Taylor
- Captain: Chris Sillay
- League: USA Rugby South
Team kit

Official website
- www.atlantarenegades.com

The Atlanta Renegades Rugby Football Club (also known as The 'Gades), founded in 1971, is a D3 (3rd Division) men's rugby union team based in Atlanta, Georgia, United States. The club competes in and is governed by the Georgia Rugby Union (GRU), USA Rugby South (USARS), and USA Rugby.

== History ==
The Atlanta Renegades Rugby Football Club was founded in 1971 by a small group of athletes dedicated to the game of rugby. The aspirations of the club were not great; in fact at that time there were no club championships, select sides, territorial sides or national side. The club philosophy was simply to work hard, play well and have fun.

Since then rugby has grown to have competition in the U.S. Renegade sides have earned a respected place in the history of Southern and American rugby.

In 1973, ARRFC hosted the first Peachtree Invitational Rugby Tournament - one of the first ever rugby tournaments to be held in the South. In 1977, the club was the first Southern team to tour England and Wales. One of the host teams has become a "brother club" to the Renegades - the Newport Saracens. To this day, members of those teams gather to travel to play in Saranac as the "Saragades" in over-45 divisional play. Also in 1977, the club formed its original charter.

On the field, the club has a long list of successes. The Renegades have been involved in territorial playoffs since 1980, through the existence of the old Eastern Rugby Union and now in USA Rugby South. Tournaments won include the Peachtree Invitational, St. Louis Ruggerfest, Gator Invitational, Savannah St. Patrick's Day Tournament, Charleston Michelob Rugby Classic, the Dogwood Invitational and others.

The ARRFC has toured Wales, Scotland, Ireland, England, The Bahamas, The Cayman Islands, and the U.S. West Coast. Touring sides to visit the Renegades include teams from Wales, Ireland, Zambia, South Africa, Argentina, England, Bermuda, The Bahamas and The Cayman Islands.

The club membership rolls have included players from not only all corners of the U.S., but also Italy, Fiji, England, Wales, Ireland, Australia, New Zealand, South Africa, Western Samoa, Uruguay, Scotland, France, Kenya, and Tonga.

== Practice/Field Location ==
The Atlanta Renegades RFC currently practice and host home games at the Atlanta Silverbacks Park. Practice starts at 7:30 PM on Tuesdays and Thursdays.
