= Augusta, Georgia =

City in the United States

- City
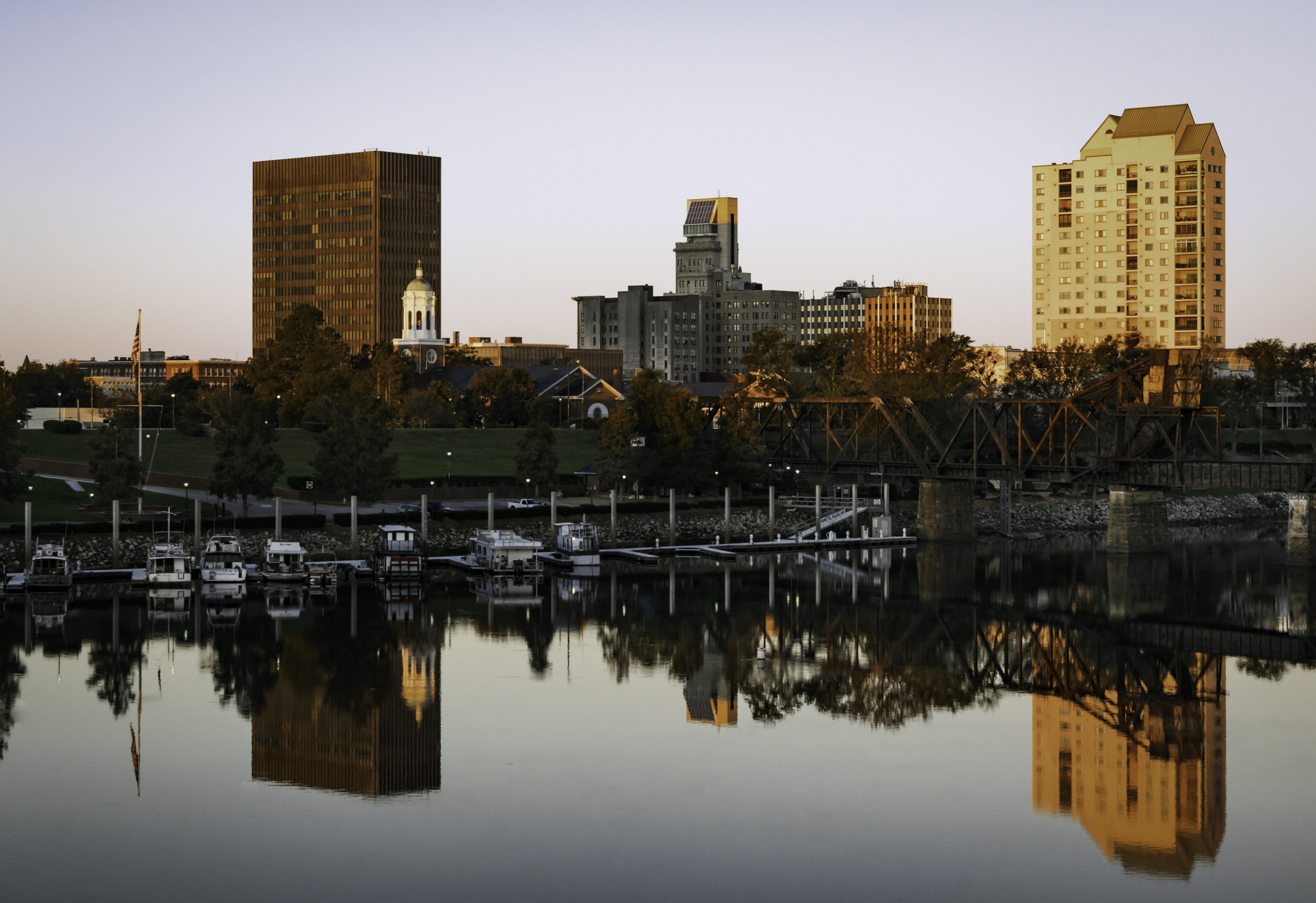
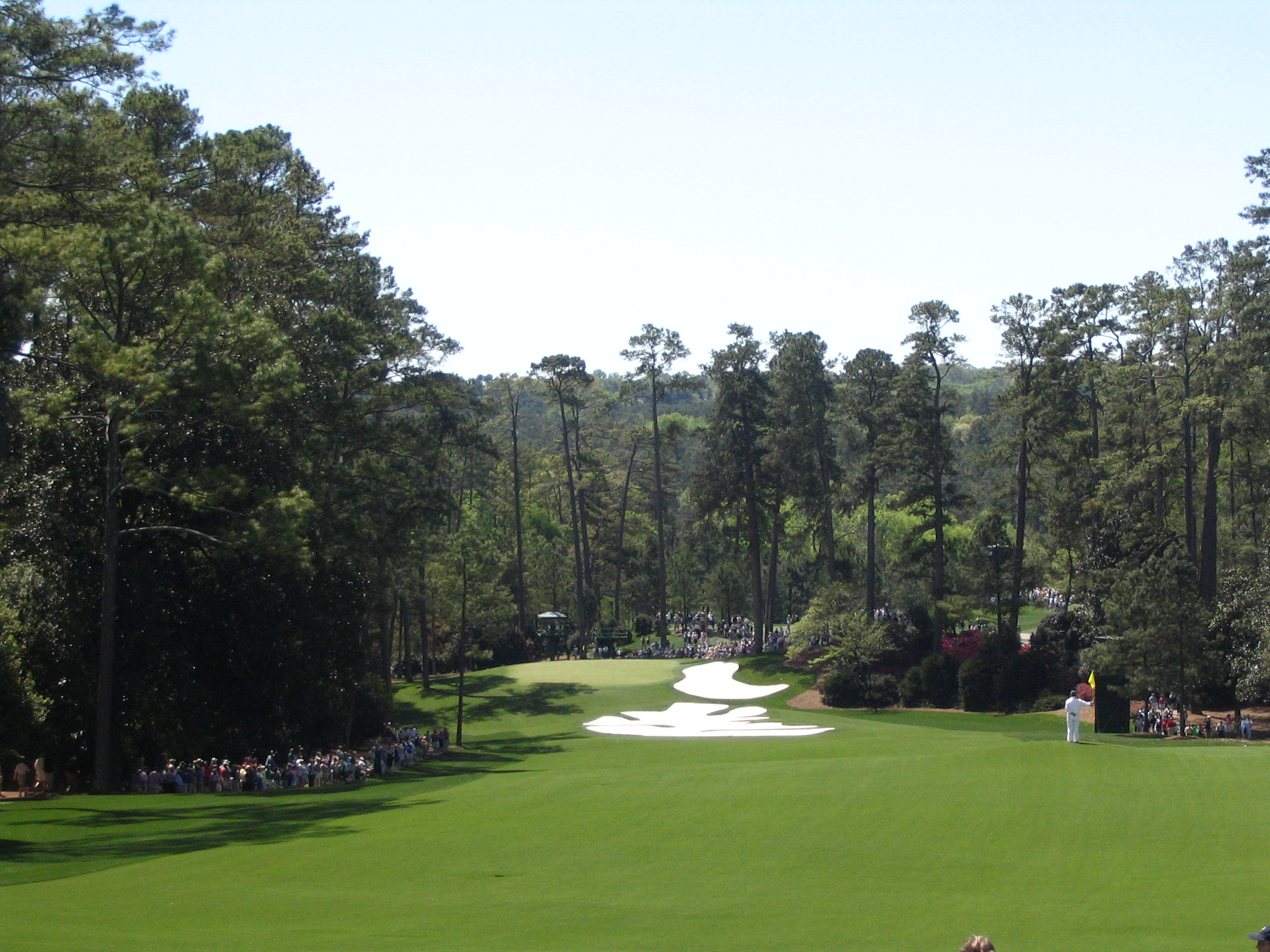
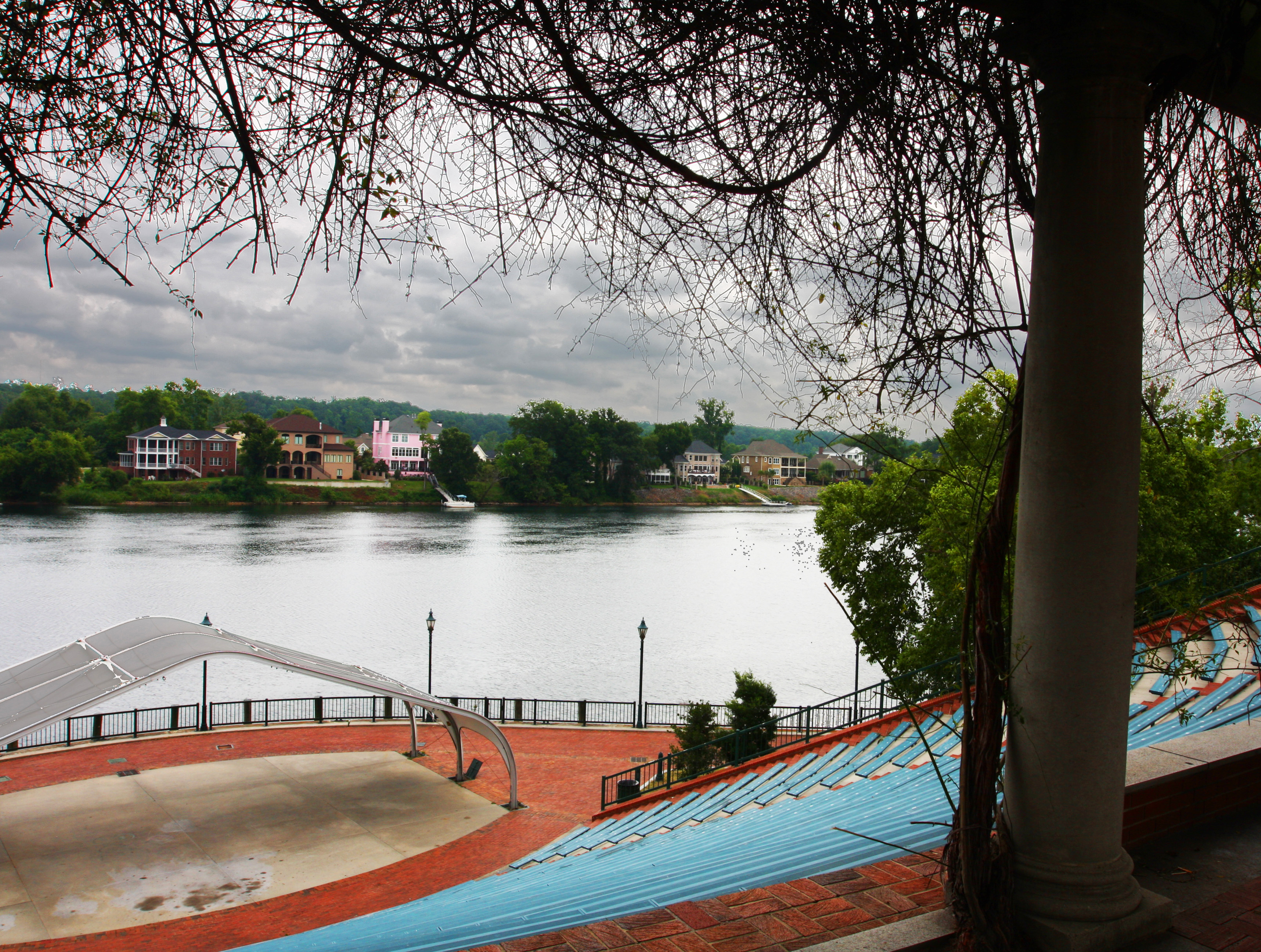
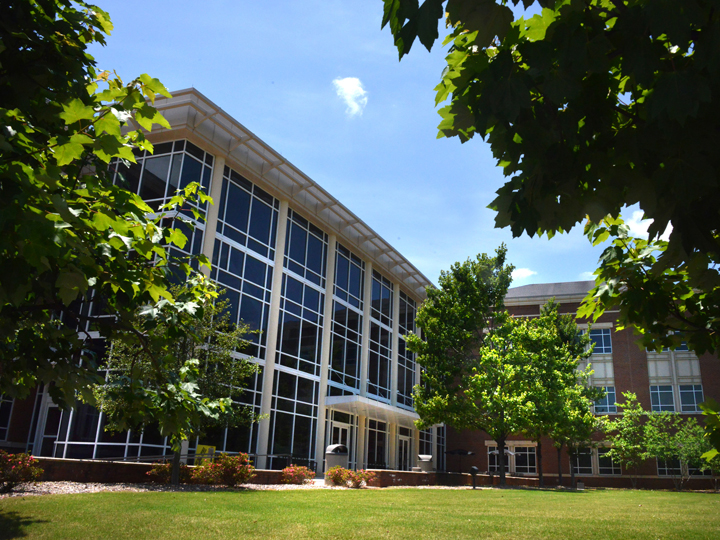
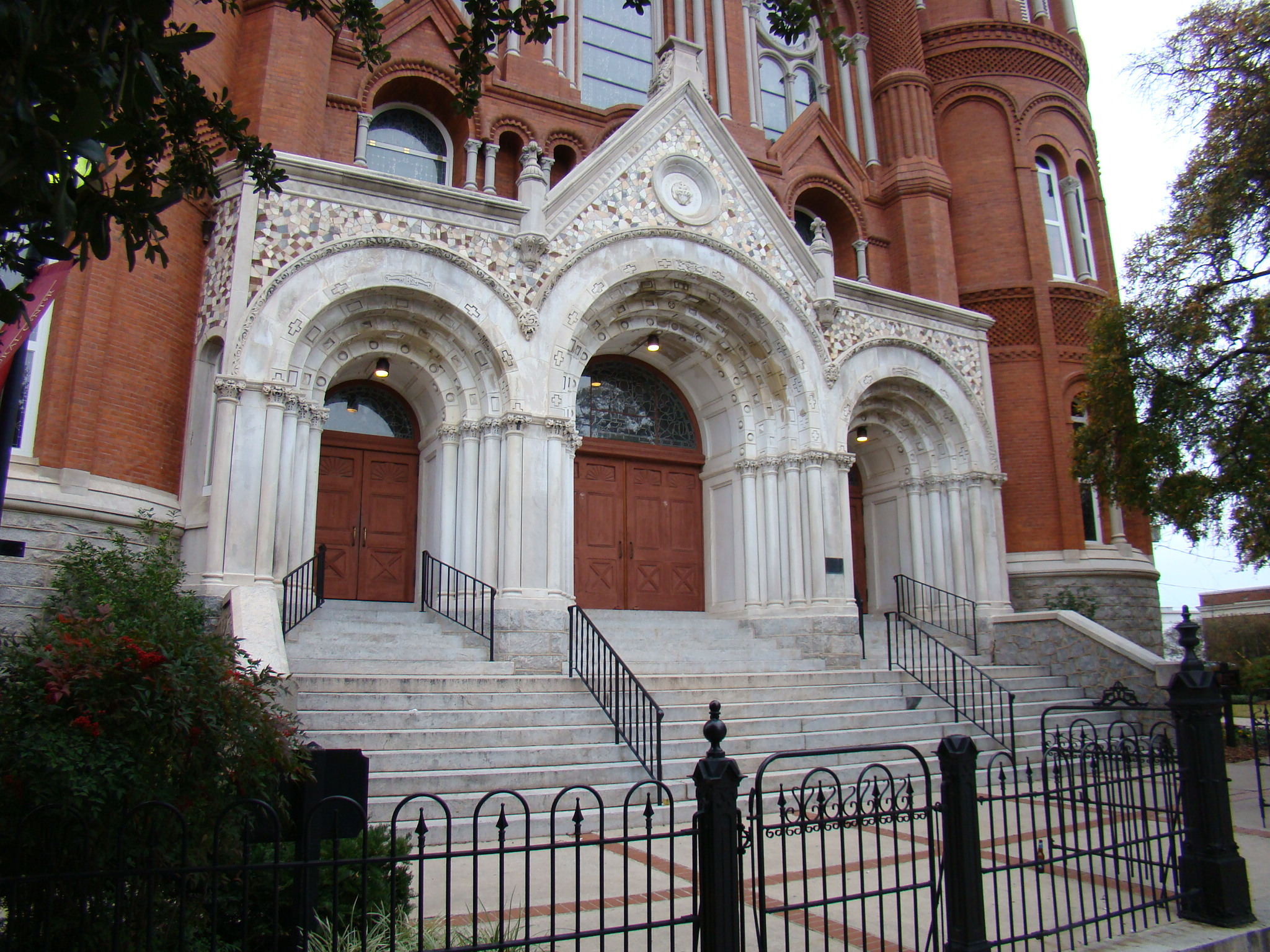
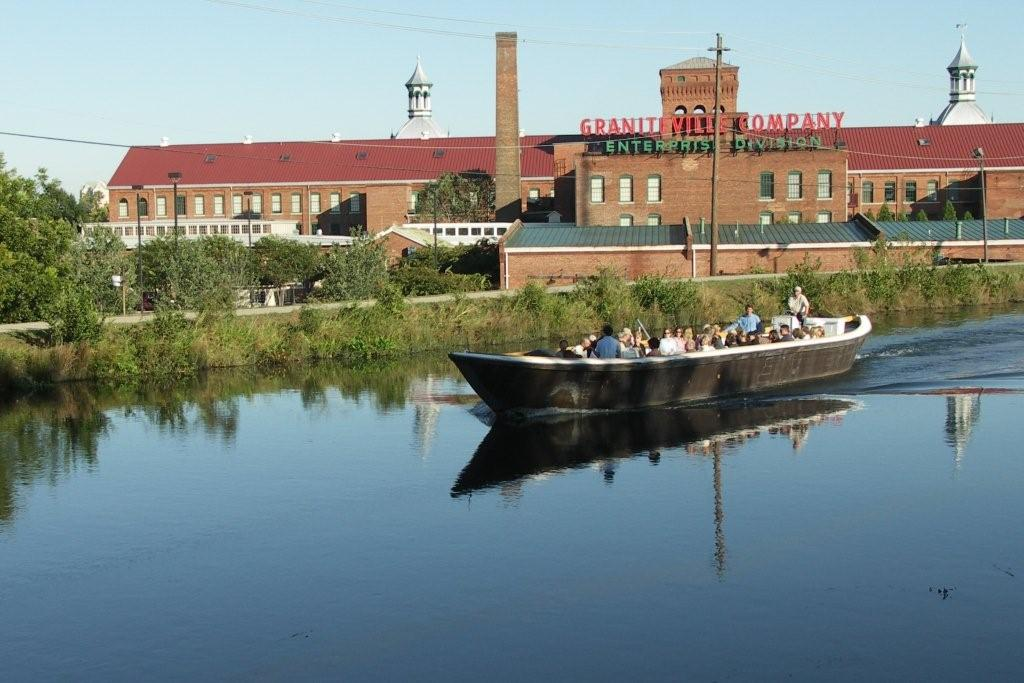
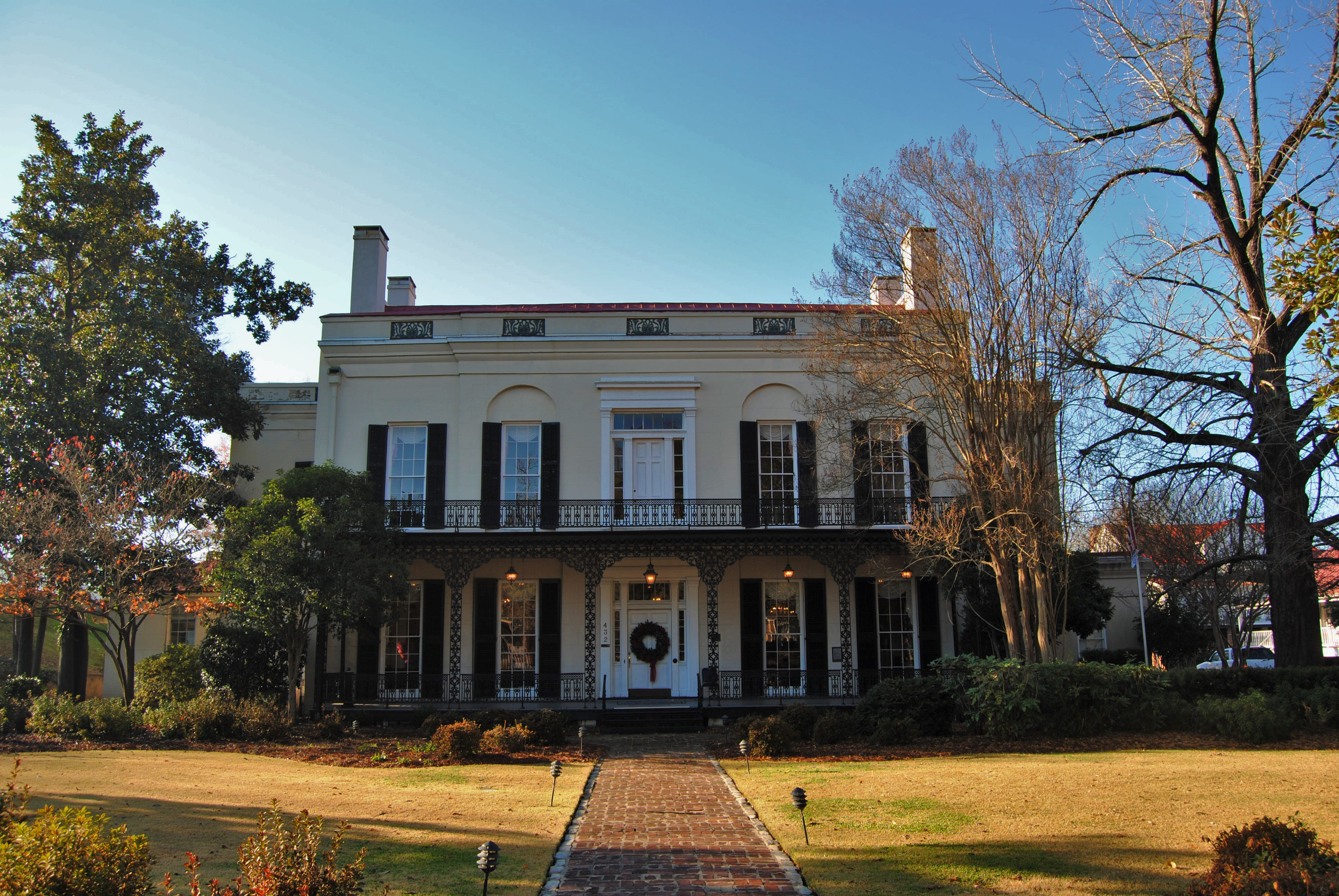
- Downtown Augusta Augusta National Golf Club Riverwalk Augusta on the Savannah River The University Hall at Augusta University Sacred Heart Cultural Center Augusta Canal with Enterprise Mill in the background Old Government House

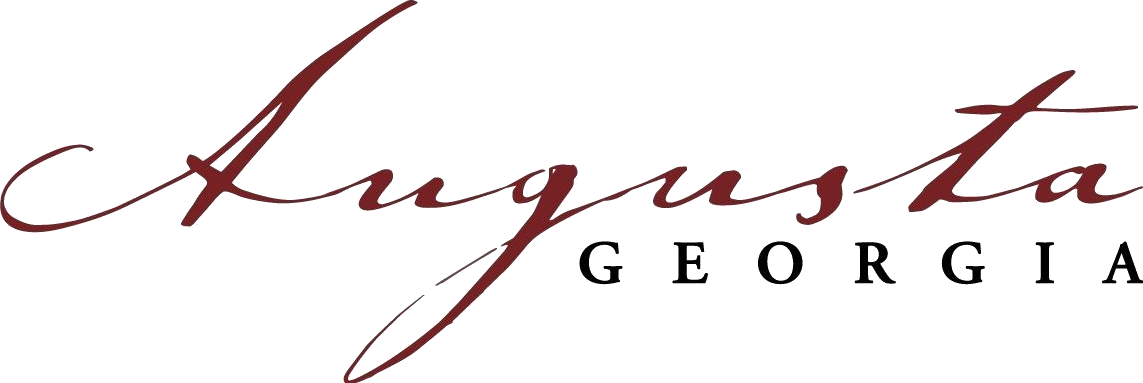
- Logo
- Nickname: "The Garden City"
- Motto: "We Feel Good"
- Interactive map of Augusta, Georgia
- Coordinates: 33°28′12″N 81°58′30″W
- Country: United States
- State: Georgia
- County: Richmond
- Established: 1736; 290 years ago
- Consolidated: January 1, 1996; 30 years ago
- Founder: James Oglethorpe
- Named for: Princess Augusta of Saxe-Gotha

Government
  - Type: Council–manager government
  - Body: Augusta Commission
  - Mayor: Garnett Johnson (D)

Area
  - City: 307.99 sq mi (797.70 km^{2})
  - Land: 302.28 sq mi (782.90 km^{2})
  - Water: 4.17 sq mi (10.80 km^{2})
- Elevation: 148 ft (45 m)

Population (2020)
  - City: 202,071
  - Estimate (2025): 201,999
  - Rank: 124th in the United States; 3rd in Georgia
  - Density: 668.5/sq mi (258.12/km^{2})
  - Urban: 431,480 (US: 95th)
  - Urban density: 1,579/sq mi (609.6/km^{2})
  - Metro: 611,000 (US: 95th)
- Time zone: UTC−5 (EST)
  - Summer (DST): UTC−4 (EDT)
- ZIP codes: 30901, 30904, 30906, 30907, 30909, 30912, 30815
- Area codes: 706, 762
- Website: augustaga.gov

Augusta (Note: /əˈɡʌstə/ ə-GUSS-tə) is a city on the central eastern border of the U.S. state of Georgia and the county seat of Richmond County. The city lies directly across the Savannah River from North Augusta, South Carolina, at the head of its navigable portion. Augusta, the third-most-populous city in Georgia (following Atlanta and Columbus), is situated in the Fall Line region of the state.

According to the U.S. Census Bureau, Augusta had a 2020 population of 202,071 and a 2025 estimated population of 201,999, not counting the independent cities of Blythe and Hephzibah located within the boundaries of Augusta-Richmond County. It is the 124th-most-populous city in the United States and the 92nd-largest metropolitan area. The process of consolidation between the city of Augusta and Richmond County began with a 1995 referendum in the two jurisdictions. The merger was completed on July 1, 1996, but it excluded the municipalities of Blythe and Hephzibah. Augusta is the principal city of the Augusta metropolitan area. In 2020, the metro area had a population of 611,000, making it the second-largest in the state (after Atlanta) and the ninth-most-populous urban center in the Deep South.

Augusta was established in 1736 and is named in honor of Princess Augusta of Saxe-Gotha (1719–1772), the bride of Frederick, Prince of Wales and the mother of the British monarch George III. During the American Civil War, Augusta housed the principal Confederate Powderworks. Augusta's warm climate made it a major resort town of the Eastern United States in the early to mid-20th century. Internationally, Augusta is best known for hosting professional golfing's Masters Tournament each spring. The Masters brings over 200,000 visitors from around the world to the Augusta National Golf Club.

Augusta lies about 148 miles from downtown Atlanta via I-20. The city is home to Fort Gordon, a major U.S. Army base formerly known as Fort Eisenhower. In 2016, the new National Cyber Security Headquarters was announced to be based in Augusta.

== History ==
=== Establishment ===
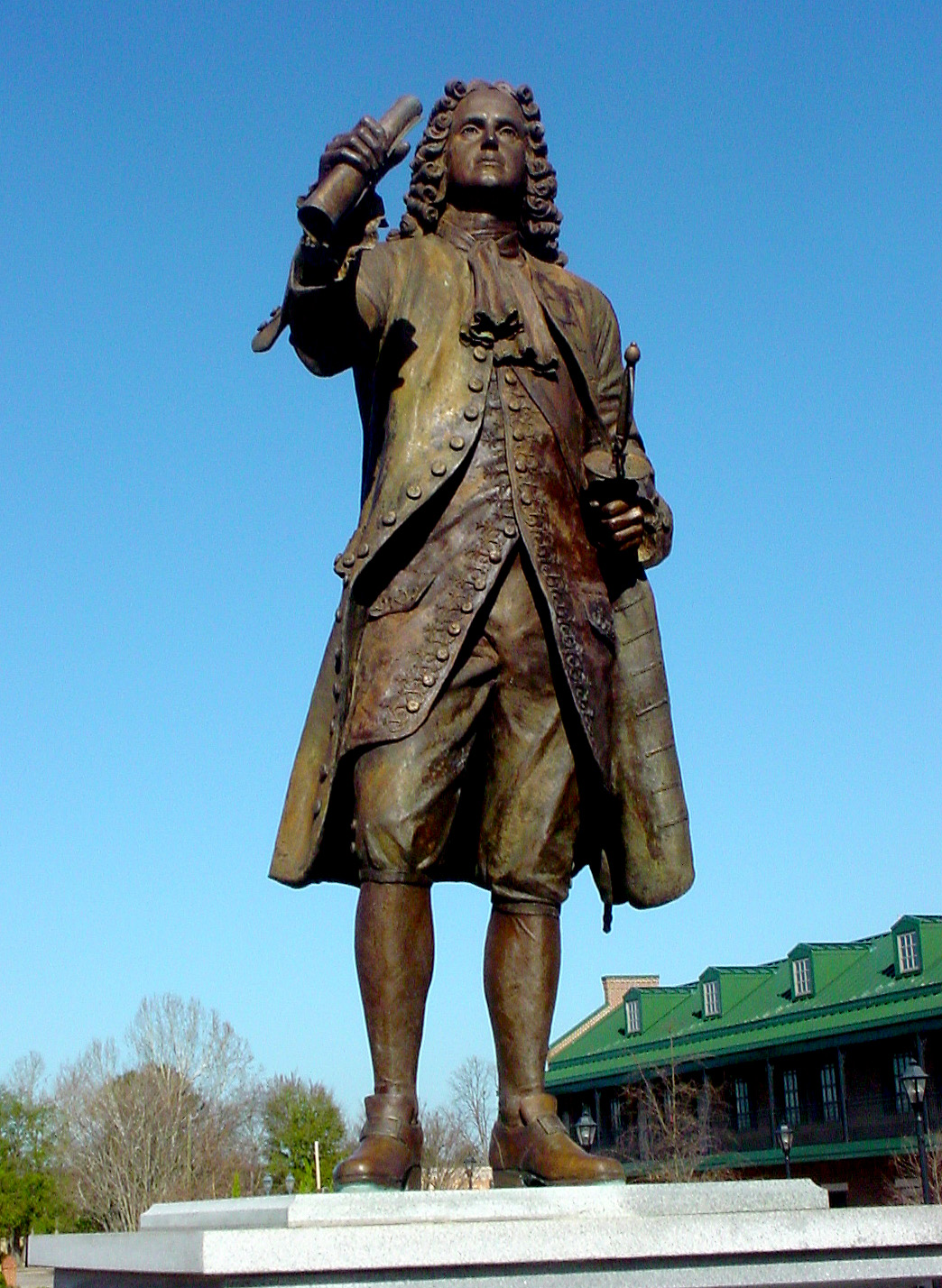
James Oglethorpe, founder of Augusta

In 1735, two years after James Oglethorpe founded Savannah, he sent a detachment of troops to explore the upper Savannah River. He gave them an order to build a fort at the head of the navigable part of the river. The expedition was led by Noble Jones, who the following year created a settlement as a first line of defense for coastal areas against potential Spanish or French invasion from the interior. Oglethorpe named the town in honor of Princess Augusta, the mother of King George III and the wife of Frederick, Prince of Wales.

Oglethorpe visited Augusta in September 1739 on his return to Savannah from a perilous visit to Coweta Town, near present-day Phenix City, Alabama. There, he had met with a convention of 7,000 Native American warriors and concluded a peace treaty with them in their territories in northern and western Georgia. During the American Revolutionary War, the Siege of Augusta resulted in the retaking the city from the British by the Americans. Augusta was the second state capital of Georgia from 1785 until 1795. A historical marker in Augusta reads:

Augusta served as the capital of Georgia from 1785 until 1795 when the seat of government was moved to the new capital, Louisville. The Georgia General Assembly met at this site in a two-story building on the corner of Elbert (Fourth) and Bay Streets. The building was known as both the State House and Government House and was adjacent to the Academy of Richmond County. In Augusta on January 2, 1788, Georgia became the fourth state to ratify the United States Constitution. In 1789 the General Assembly, meeting here, adopted a new state constitution creating today's bicameral (two-house) state legislature consisting of the Senate and House of Representatives.

=== Development ===
Augusta developed rapidly as a market town as the Black Belt in the Piedmont was developed for cotton cultivation. Invention of the cotton gin made processing of short-staple cotton profitable, and this type of cotton was well-suited to the upland areas. Cotton plantations were worked by slave labor, with hundreds of thousands of slaves shipped from the Upper South to the Deep South in the domestic slave trade. Many of the slaves were brought from the Lowcountry, where their Gullah culture had developed on the large Sea Island cotton and rice plantations.

During the American Civil War, Augusta was home to many war industries, including the main facilities of the vast Confederate Powderworks. After the war, Augusta had a booming textile industry, lead by the construction of many mills along the Augusta Canal to include Enterprise Mill, Sibley Mill, and King Mill.

The devastating Augusta fire of 1916 damaged 35 blocks of the city's downtown and wiped out many buildings of historical significance, some dating back to the 18th century.

Augusta was a major center of economic activity during Reconstruction and thereafter. In the mid-20th century, it was a site of civil-rights demonstrations. In 1970, Charles Oatman, a mentally disabled teenager, was killed by his cellmates in an Augusta jail. A protest against his death broke out into a riot involving some 500 people; during the unrest, six Black men were killed by police, each found to have been shot in the back. Noted singer and entertainer James Brown, a native of Augusta, was called in to help quell lingering tensions, at which he succeeded.

=== Hyde Park contamination ===
In 1993, an area known as Hyde Park in Augusta was investigated by the EPA for contamination. The investigation totaled $1.2 million. Air, groundwater, and soil were all believed to be contaminated, and people living in the area were hoping for government assistance to move away from Hyde Park. Two of five neighborhoods in Hyde Park appeared to have arsenic, chromium, and dioxin, while all five were found to have PCBs and lead. However, residents were told it was not a risk to their health unless they somehow ingested it on a regular basis. At the time the article was written, the citizens still questioned why the EPA and the Agency for Toxic Disease Registry did not consider these chemicals as a threat to them. Hyde Park also has higher rates of certain illnesses (such as cancer, infections, and rashes) than the average in America, and the citizens question why that was not considered.

== Geography ==
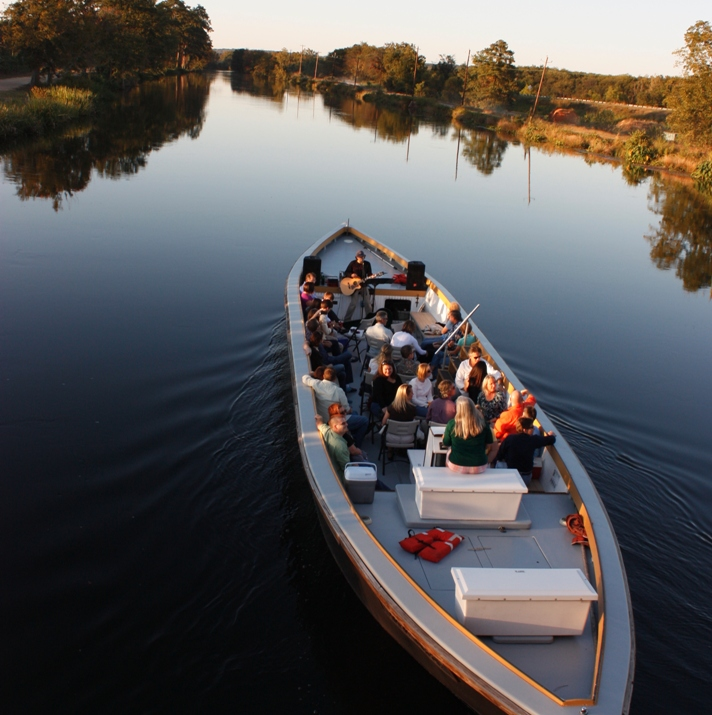
Augusta Canal

Augusta is located along the Georgia/South Carolina border, about 150 mi (240 km) east of Atlanta and 74 mi (119 km) west of Columbia, South Carolina.

According to the United States Census Bureau, the Augusta–Richmond County balance has a total area of 306.5 sq mi (793.8 km^{2}), of which 4.3 sq mi (11.1 km^{2}) (1.42%) are covered by water.

Augusta is located about halfway up the Savannah River on the fall line, which creates a number of small falls on the river. The city marks the end of a navigable waterway for the river and the entry to the Georgia Piedmont area.

The Clarks Hill Dam is built on the fall line near Augusta, forming Clarks Hill Lake. Farther downstream, near the border of Columbia County, is the Stevens Creek Dam, which generates hydroelectric power. Even farther downstream is the Augusta Diversion Dam, which marks the beginning of the Augusta Canal and channels Savannah River waters into the canal.

=== Climate ===
As with the rest of the state, Augusta has a humid subtropical climate (Köppen Cfa), with short, mild winters, very hot, humid summers, and a wide diurnal temperature variation throughout much of the year, despite its low elevation and humidity. The monthly daily average temperature ranges from 45.4 °F (7.4 °C) in January to 81.6 °F (27.6 °C) in July; 53 nights have the low reach the freezing mark, 82 days reach or exceed 90 °F (32 °C), and 5 1/2 days reach 100 °F (38 °C) annually. Extreme temperatures range from −1 °F (−18 °C) on January 21, 1985, up to 108 °F (42 °C) on August 10, 2007, and August 21, 1983. Snowfall is not nearly as common as in Atlanta, due largely to Augusta's elevation, with downtown Augusta being about 900 ft (270 m) lower than downtown Atlanta. The heaviest recorded snowfall was in February 1973, with 14.0 inches (36 cm) Freezing rain is also a threat in wintertime.

Climate data for Augusta Regional Airport, Georgia (1991–2020 normals, (Note: Mean monthly maxima and minima (i.e. the expected highest and lowest temperature readings at any point during the year or given month) calculated based on data at said location from 1991 to 2020.) extremes 1871–present (Note: Official records for Augusta were kept at downtown from February 1871 to March 1944, Daniel Field from April 1944 to June 1950, and at Bush Field / Augusta Regional Airport since July 1950. For more information, see Threadex))
Month	Jan	Feb	Mar	Apr	May	Jun	Jul	Aug	Sep	Oct	Nov	Dec	Year
Record high °F (°C)	84 (29)	88 (31)	93 (34)	96 (36)	101 (38)	106 (41)	107 (42)	108 (42)	106 (41)	101 (38)	90 (32)	84 (29)	108 (42)
Mean maximum °F (°C)	75.6 (24.2)	78.8 (26.0)	84.9 (29.4)	88.7 (31.5)	94.3 (34.6)	98.1 (36.7)	99.8 (37.7)	99.1 (37.3)	95.1 (35.1)	89.0 (31.7)	82.1 (27.8)	76.9 (24.9)	100.8 (38.2)
Mean daily maximum °F (°C)	59.6 (15.3)	63.5 (17.5)	71.0 (21.7)	78.5 (25.8)	85.9 (29.9)	91.3 (32.9)	94.1 (34.5)	92.6 (33.7)	87.8 (31.0)	79.0 (26.1)	69.1 (20.6)	61.5 (16.4)	77.8 (25.4)
Daily mean °F (°C)	47.4 (8.6)	50.8 (10.4)	57.5 (14.2)	64.6 (18.1)	72.7 (22.6)	79.7 (26.5)	82.8 (28.2)	81.8 (27.7)	76.4 (24.7)	66.0 (18.9)	55.6 (13.1)	49.4 (9.7)	65.4 (18.6)
Mean daily minimum °F (°C)	35.3 (1.8)	38.1 (3.4)	44.1 (6.7)	50.6 (10.3)	59.6 (15.3)	68.1 (20.1)	71.6 (22.0)	71.0 (21.7)	65.0 (18.3)	53.1 (11.7)	42.2 (5.7)	37.3 (2.9)	53.0 (11.7)
Mean minimum °F (°C)	17.9 (−7.8)	21.0 (−6.1)	25.8 (−3.4)	33.7 (0.9)	44.1 (6.7)	56.5 (13.6)	63.1 (17.3)	61.5 (16.4)	50.4 (10.2)	35.1 (1.7)	25.4 (−3.7)	20.6 (−6.3)	15.9 (−8.9)
Record low °F (°C)	−1 (−18)	3 (−16)	12 (−11)	26 (−3)	35 (2)	46 (8)	54 (12)	52 (11)	36 (2)	22 (−6)	11 (−12)	5 (−15)	−1 (−18)
Average precipitation inches (mm)	3.84 (98)	3.67 (93)	4.08 (104)	2.92 (74)	3.05 (77)	4.75 (121)	4.48 (114)	4.61 (117)	3.60 (91)	2.56 (65)	2.66 (68)	3.87 (98)	44.09 (1,120)
Average snowfall inches (cm)	0.4 (1.0)	0.3 (0.76)	0.0 (0.0)	0.0 (0.0)	0.0 (0.0)	0.0 (0.0)	0.0 (0.0)	0.0 (0.0)	0.0 (0.0)	0.0 (0.0)	0.0 (0.0)	0.1 (0.25)	0.8 (2.0)
Average precipitation days (≥ 0.01 in)	9.9	9.1	8.6	7.6	7.9	11.1	11.3	11.1	7.9	6.4	7.0	9.4	107.3
Average snowy days (≥ 0.1 in)	0.3	0.1	0.0	0.0	0.0	0.0	0.0	0.0	0.0	0.0	0.0	0.1	0.5
Average relative humidity (%)	69.8	65.8	65.0	64.5	69.6	71.3	73.9	76.5	76.2	73.3	71.9	71.6	70.8
Source: NOAA (relative humidity 1961–1990)

== Demographics ==
Historical population
Census	Pop.	Note	%±
1800	2,215		—
1810	2,476		11.8%
1830	6,710		—
1840	6,403		−4.6%
1850	9,448		47.6%
1860	12,493		32.2%
1870	15,389		23.2%
1880	21,891		42.3%
1890	33,300		52.1%
1900	39,441		18.4%
1910	41,040		4.1%
1920	52,548		28.0%
1930	60,342		14.8%
1940	65,919		9.2%
1950	71,508		8.5%
1960	70,626		−1.2%
1970	59,864		−15.2%
1980	47,532		−20.6%
1990	44,639		−6.1%
2000	195,182		337.2%
2010	195,844		0.3%
2020	202,071		3.2%
2025 (est.)	201,999		0.0%
U.S. Decennial Census; 1850-1870 1870-1880; 1890-1910 1920-1930; 1940 1950 1960; 1970 1980 1990; 2000 2010 2020

Augusta Richmond consolidated government (balance), Georgia – Racial and ethnic composition Note: the US Census treats Hispanic/Latino as an ethnic category. This table excludes Latinos from the racial categories and assigns them to a separate category. Hispanics/Latinos may be of any race.
Race / Ethnicity (NH = Non-Hispanic)	Pop 2000	Pop 2010	Pop 2020	% 2000	% 2010	% 2020
White alone (NH)	85,340	73,277	65,721	43.72%	37.42%	32.52%
Black or African American alone (NH)	97,517	105,921	111,535	49.96%	54.08%	55.19%
Native American or Alaska Native alone (NH)	491	557	480	0.25%	0.28%	0.24%
Asian alone (NH)	2,925	3,259	3,898	1.50%	1.66%	1.93%
Native Hawaiian or Pacific Islander alone (NH)	222	370	386	0.11%	0.19%	0.19%
Other race alone (NH)	359	305	880	0.18%	0.16%	0.44%
Mixed race or Multiracial (NH)	2,881	4,102	7,910	1.48%	2.09%	3.91%
Hispanic or Latino (any race)	5,447	8,053	11,271	2.79%	4.11%	5.58%
Total	195,182	195,844	202,081	100.00%	100.00%	100.00%

At the 2020 United States census, 202,081 people, 66,838 households, and 41,517 families were residing in the city. During the 2010 U.S. census, the city's population was 195,844, up from 195,182 at the 2000 United States census.

In 2000, the city's racial and ethnic composition was 43.72% non-Hispanic White, 49.96% African American, 0.25% Native American, 1.50% Asian, 0.11% Pacific Islander, 0.18% some other race, 1.48% multiracial, and 2.79% Hispanic or Latino of any race. By the 2020 census, its racial and ethnic makeup was 35.52% non-Hispanic White, 55.19% African American, 0.24% Asian, 1.93% Asian, 0.19% Pacific Islander, 0.44% some other race, 3.91% multiracial, and 5.58% Hispanic or Latino of any race. This reflected nationwide trends of greater diversification since the beginning of the 21st century.

== Economy ==
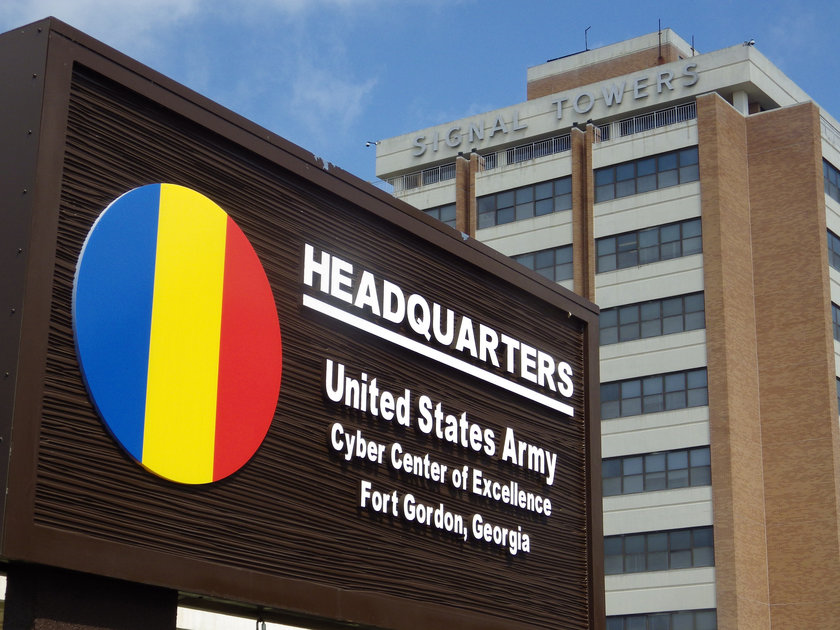
Fort Gordon is home to the U.S. Army Cyber Center of Excellence, which has led to a large increase in cyber jobs in the Augusta metro region.

Augusta is a regional center of medicine, biotechnology, and cyber security. Augusta University, the state's only public health sciences graduate university, employs over 7,000 people. Along with Piedmont Augusta, the Medical District of Augusta employs over 25,000 people and has an economic impact over $1.8 billion.

The city's three largest employers are Augusta University, the Savannah River Site (a Department of Energy nuclear facility), and the U.S. Army Cyber Center of Excellence at Fort Gordon, which oversees training for Cyber, Signal Corps, and Electronic Warfare.

With the establishment of the Georgia Cyber Center in downtown Augusta, the Augusta metro region has become a hub for cyber security-based companies looking to locate to the area, in part, as well to the establishment of the U.S. Army Cyber Command relocating to Fort Gordon from Fort Meade. Augusta plays host to TechNet annually, which brings in various military, government, and private-sector leaders to the area to showcase new cyber-related products, as well as discussions on cyber-based collaboration efforts between the public and private sectors.

As of February 2025, the metro area unemployment rate was 4.5%, slightly above the national average.

Companies that have facilities, headquarters, or distribution centers in the Augusta metro area include CareSouth, NutraSweet, T-Mobile, Covidien, Solo Cup Company, Automatic Data Processing, Clearwater Paper, Solvay S.A., Bridgestone, Teleperformance, Olin Corporation, Sitel, E-Z-GO, Taxslayer, Elanco, KSB Company (Georgia Iron Works), Club Car (Worldwide Headquarters), Halocarbon, MTU Friedrichshafen (subsidiary of Tognum), Kimberly Clark Corporation, Nutrien (formerly PotashCorp), John Deere, Kellogg's and Delta Air Lines' baggage call center.

=== Top employers ===
According to the Augusta Economic Development Authority as of 2013, the top manufacturing employers in the city were:

Rank	Employer	Number of employees
1	Textron Specialized Vehicles	1,350
2	Graphic Packaging International	963
3	Ferrara USA	900
4	FPL Food	660
5	Thermal Ceramics	400
6	Cardinal Health	390
7	Nutrien	390
8	Augusta Coca-Cola	300
9	Solvay Advanced Partners	300
10	Starbucks	260

The top public sector employers were:

Rank	Employer	Number of employees
1	Fort Gordon	29,252
2	Augusta University	6,775
3	NSA Georgia	6,000
4	Augusta University Health System	5,341
5	Richmond County School System	4,418
6	Piedmont Augusta	3,000
7	Augusta–Richmond County	2,840
8	Charlie Norwood VA Medical Center	2,082
9	Doctors Hospital	1,837
10	East Central Regional Hospital	1,400

== Arts and culture ==
=== Historic districts ===
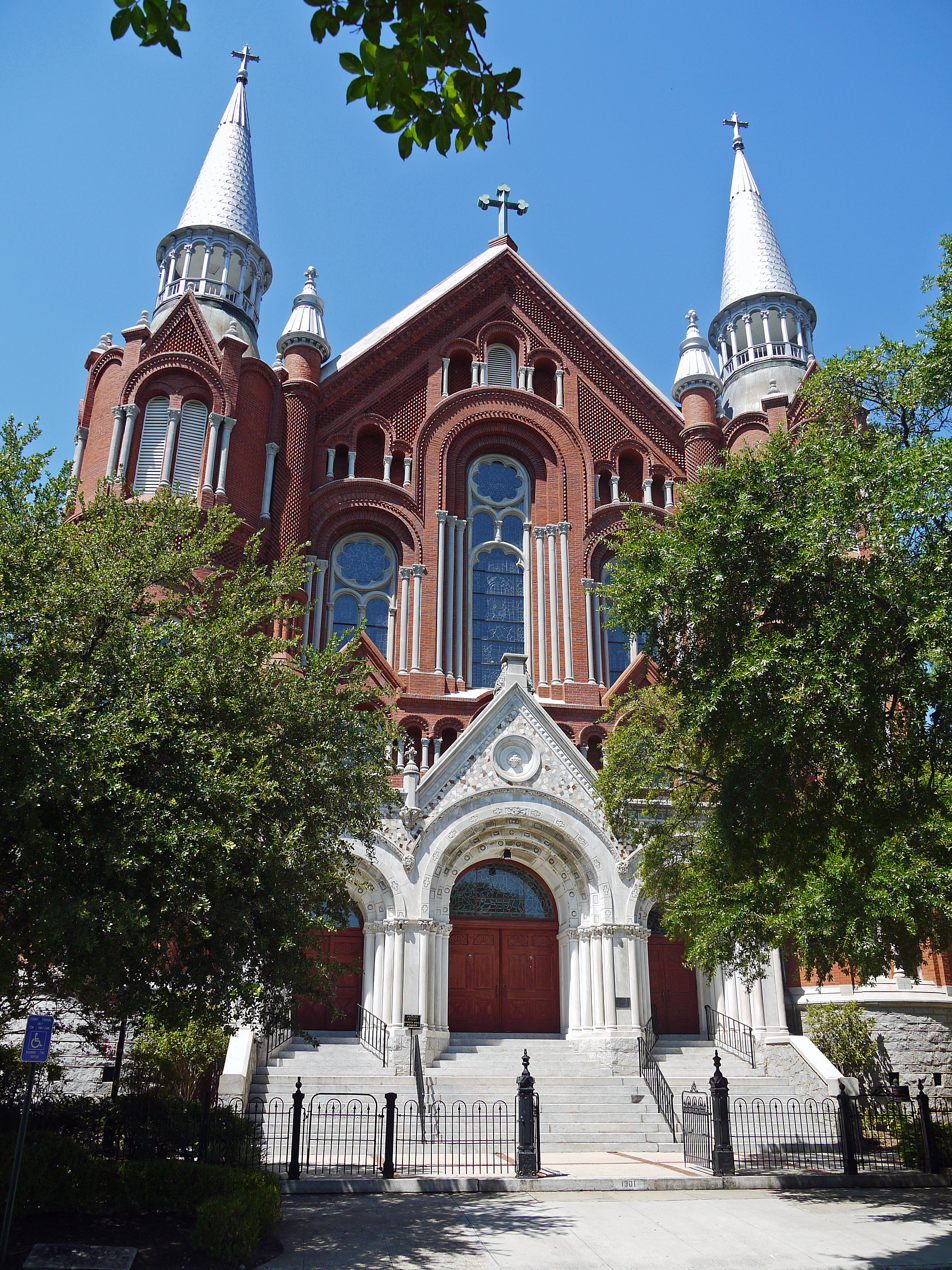
Sacred Heart Cultural Center

Ten historic districts are located throughout the city of Augusta. The most prominent, Augusta Downtown Historic District, encompasses most of downtown Augusta and its pre-Civil War area. The Augusta Downtown Historic District was listed on the National Register of Historic Places in 2004.

Augusta also includes the:

- Bethlehem Historic District
- Broad Street Historic District
- Greene Street Historic District
- Harrisburg–West End Historic District
- Laney–Walker North Historic District
- Paine College Historic District
- Pinched Gut Historic District
- Sand Hills Historic District
- Summerville Historic District

=== Tallest buildings ===
The tallest buildings in Augusta include the Lamar Building, River Place Condominiums, and Augusta University Building.

== Sports ==
=== Teams ===
==== Current ====
The Augusta GreenJackets minor-league baseball club, formerly located at Lake Olmstead Stadium in Augusta, now play at SRP Park along the Savannah River in North Augusta, South Carolina. The team began to play in 1988 as the Augusta Pirates, affiliated with the Pittsburgh Pirates. Later affiliated with the Boston Red Sox and the San Francisco Giants, the GreenJackets are now the Class A affiliate of the Atlanta Braves.

The Augusta Rugby Football Club is a division 2 men's club competing in the Palmetto Rugby Union, part of the USA Rugby South Conference.

Augusta has an all-female flat-track roller derby team, the Soul City Sirens. Founded in 2008, this league is all-volunteer and skater owned.

==== Former ====
The Augusta Lynx were a minor-league professional ice hockey team based in Augusta, Georgia. The Lynx played their home games at the James Brown Arena from 1998 until 2008. The Lynx, which played in the ECHL, had affiliations with the Tampa Bay Lightning of the NHL and the Norfolk Admirals of the AHL.

The Augusta RiverHawks were a professional minor-league ice hockey team. They played in the Southern Professional Hockey League (SPHL) from 2010 to 2013. They played their home games at the James Brown Arena.

The Augusta Stallions were a professional Arena Football team founded in 1999. They were one of the 15 original teams to join the inaugural 2000 AF2 season. They started off in the American Conference, before switching to the Southeast Division in 2001, and then the Eastern Division in 2002. The team folded in 2002.

Augusta was also home to the former Augusta 706ers, a minor-league professional basketball team in the American Basketball Association. The team was founded in 2017 and stopped operations in December 2018 because of a lack of funds. The team played all home games at the James Brown Arena.

Club	Sport	League	Venue
Augusta GreenJackets	Baseball	Carolina League	SRP Park
Augusta Mad Dogs	Rugby	Palmetto Rugby Union	Larry Bray Memorial Pitch
Augusta Furies	Women's Rugby	Carolinas Geographic Union	Larry Bray Memorial Pitch
Soul City Sirens	Roller derby	WFTDA	Red Wing Rollerway
Georgia Soul	Basketball	Women's American Basketball Association	Butler High School Gymnasium
Georgia Soul	Basketball	The Basketball League	H.E.A.L. Complex at Paine College

=== Tournaments ===
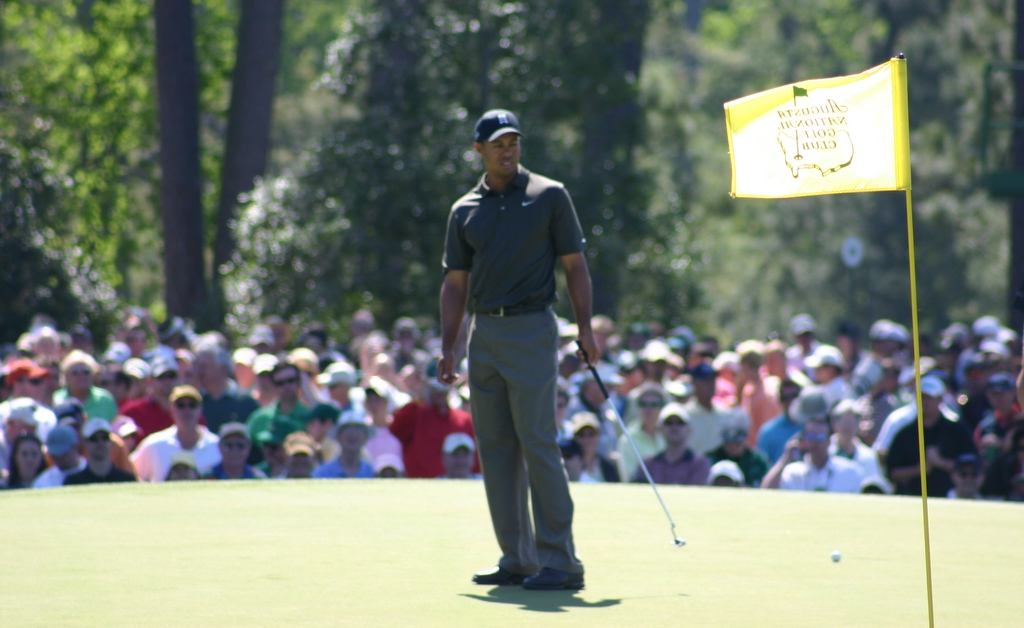
Tiger Woods at the practice rounds for the 2006 Masters Tournament

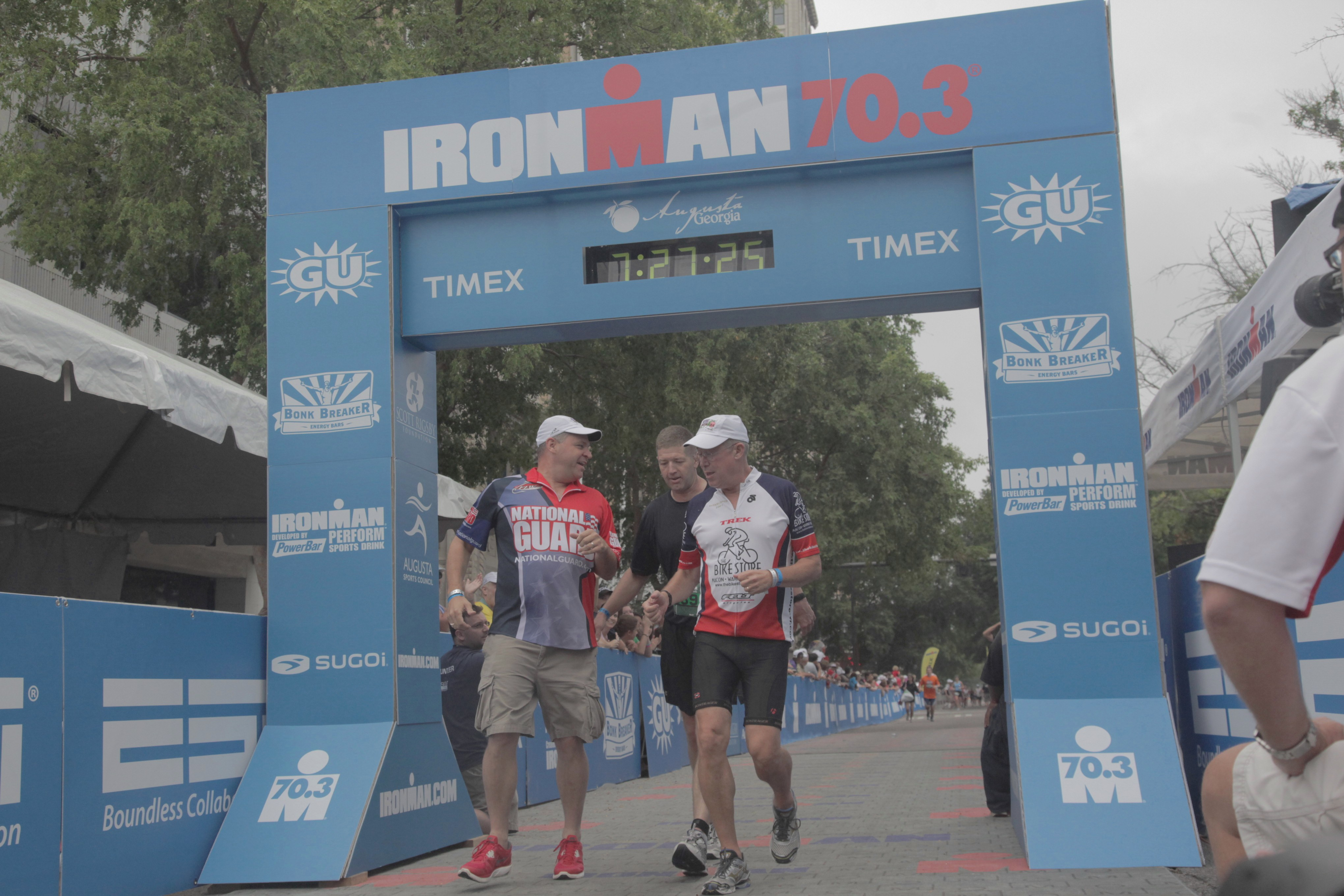
Competitors cross the finish line at the Ironman 70.3 Augusta.

Augusta National Golf Club hosts the first major golf tournament of each year, The Masters.

The Augusta Top Gun Series is a series of tournaments sanctioned by the Professional Disc Golf Association, held at various venues in Augusta, including Pendleton King Park and Lake Olmstead.

Augusta hosted the Augusta Southern Nationals drag boat Race for 30 consecutive years. Held on the Savannah River until 2016, the race was part of the Lucas Oil Drag Boat Racing Series.

Augusta hosts one of the largest Ironman 70.3 competitions, which includes cycling around Augusta, running through Downtown Augusta, and swimming on the Savannah River.

== Parks and recreation ==
- Riverwalk Augusta – riverfront park along and on top of the city's levee
- Augusta Canal – historic canal with bike/pedestrian path
- Phinizy Swamp Nature Park – wetlands park with pedestrian/bike paths and boardwalks
- Augusta Municipal Golf Course – a public golf course renovated by Augusta National Golf Club

== Government ==
In 1995, citizens of Augusta and unincorporated parts of Richmond County voted to consolidate their city and county governments. Citizens of Hephzibah and Blythe, also located in Richmond County, voted against joining in the merger, which took effect January 1, 1996. The unified government consists of a mayor and 10 commissioners. Eight commissioners represent single-member districts, while two are elected at-large, each to represent a super district that encompasses half of Augusta-Richmond's population. A May 2024 referendum, giving the mayor full voting powers on the Augusta Commission, was approved by Augusta voters by 74%, with the mayor previously being allowed to vote only in the case of a tie on the commission. The government is a Council–manager government, with the commission appointing a County Administrator to carry out ordinances and directives of the government.

Augusta - Richmond County Presidential Election Results
Year	Democrat	Republican	Other
2024	67.79%	31.67%	0.53%
2020	67.89%	30.75%	1.36%
2016	65.00%	32.60%	1.40%
2012	66.39%	32.64%	0.97%
2008	65.60%	33.80%	0.60%
2004	56.60%	42.90%	0.50%
2000	54.77%	44.43%	0.80%
1996	54.05%	41.62%	4.33%

== Education ==
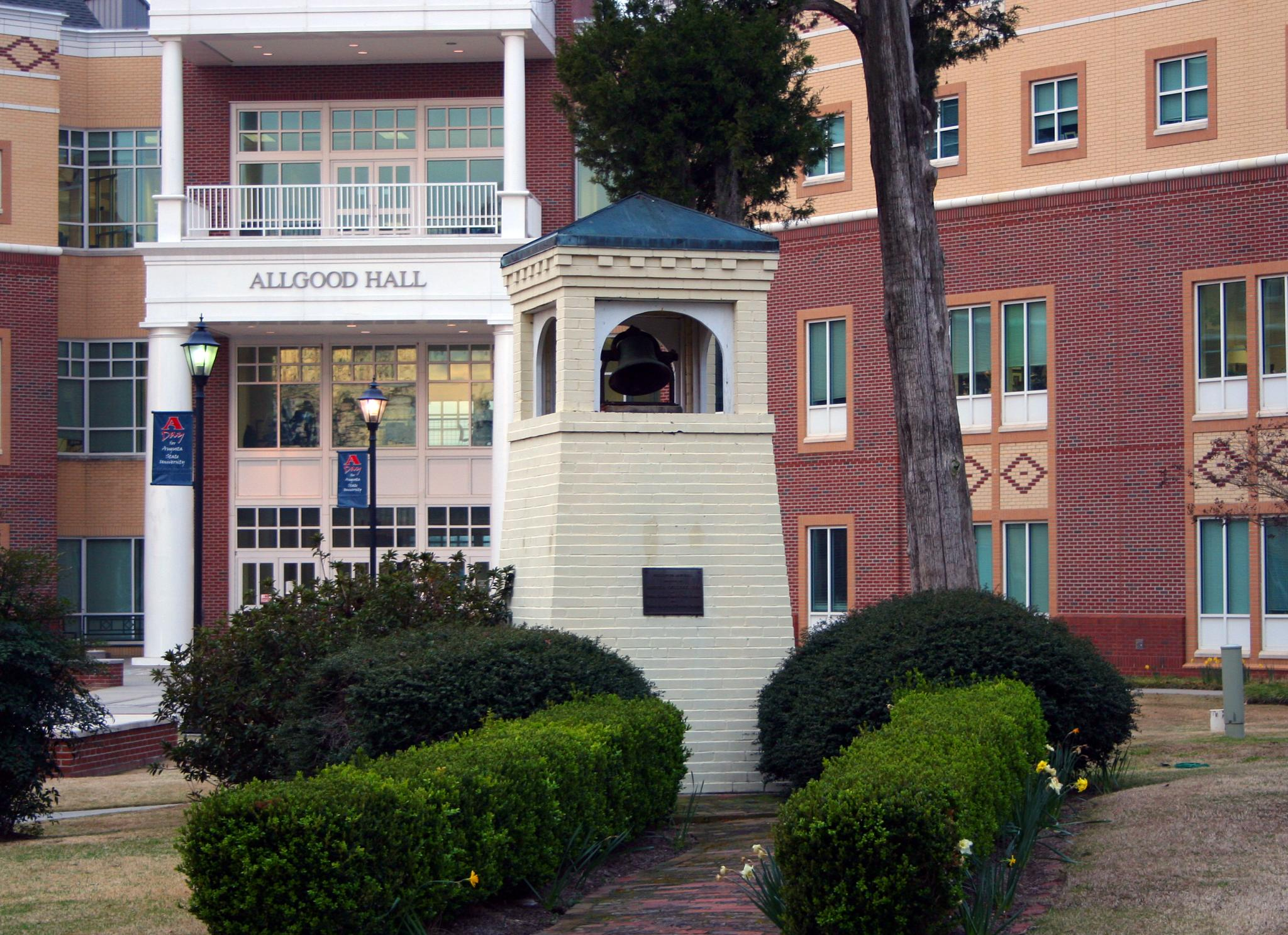
Allgood Hall at Augusta University

=== Colleges and universities ===
==== Main campuses ====
- Augusta University (public research university)
- Augusta Technical College (state technical college)
- Paine College (private, Methodist historically black college)

==== Satellite campuses ====
- East Georgia State College (state four-year college), main campus located in Swainsboro
- Georgia Military College (state funded military college), main campus located in Milledgeville
- Brenau University (private, not-for-profit, undergraduate- and graduate-level higher education), main campus located in Gainesville, Georgia

=== K–12 schools ===
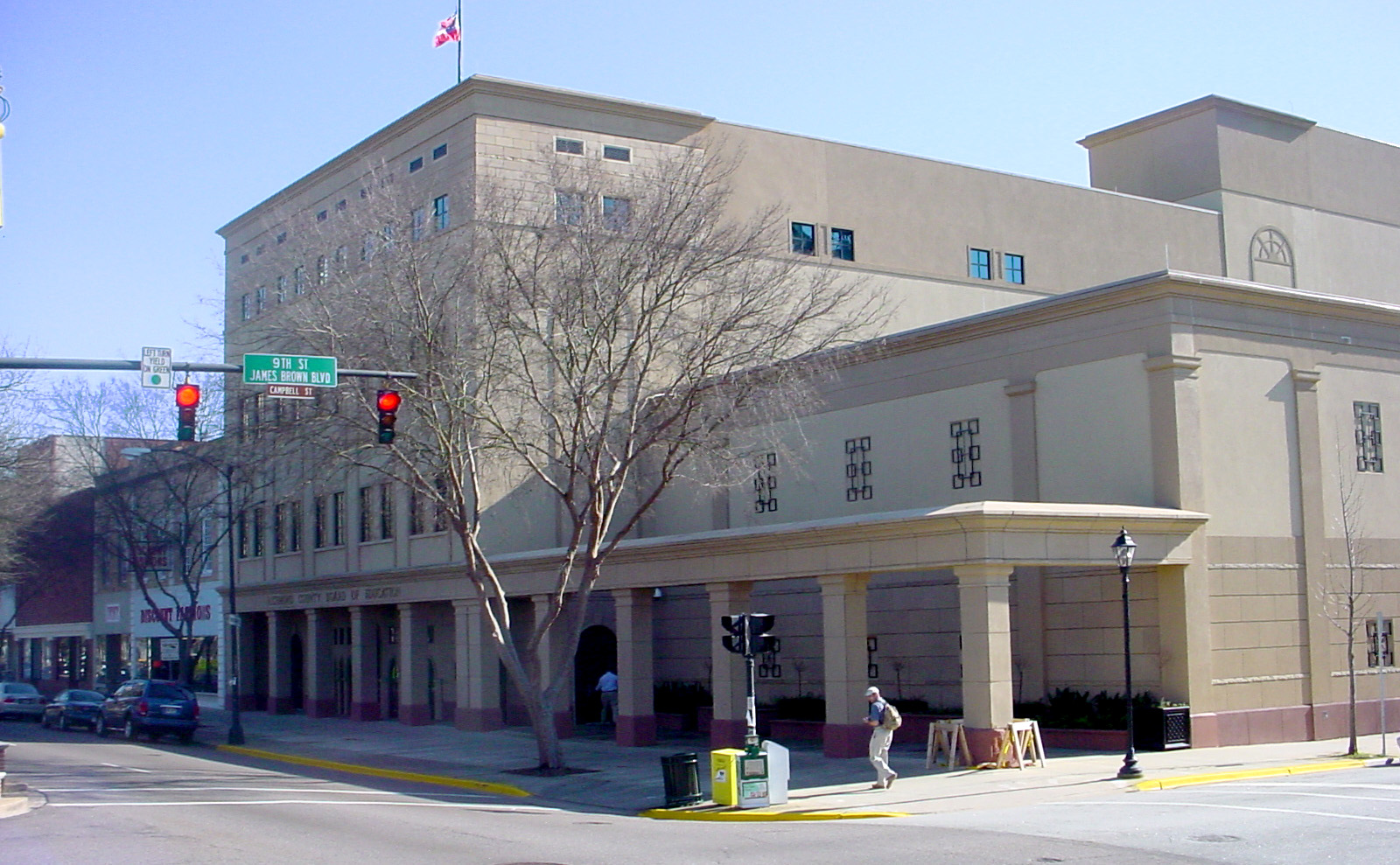
Richmond County Board of Education central office

Public K–12 schools in Augusta are managed by the Richmond County School System, which covers all of Richmond County. The school system contains 36 elementary schools, 10 middle schools, and the following eight high schools: Glenn Hills, Butler, Westside, Hephzibah, T. W. Josey, A.R.C. (Academy of Richmond County), Lucy Craft Laney, and Cross Creek. There are four magnet schools: C. T. Walker Traditional Magnet School, A. R. Johnson Health Science and Engineering Magnet High School, Davidson Fine Arts, and the Richmond County Technical Career Magnet School.

In 2026, the Richmond County School System Board of Education approved a districtwide reorganization plan that included the replacement of Barton Chapel Elementary School, which will temporarily consolidate with Glenn Hills Elementary School during construction, before both merge into a new facility. Once the schools merge into the new building, Glenn Hills Elementary will close. The plan also calls for the closure of Jenkins-White Elementary School, the consolidation of John M. Tutt Middle School with Langford Middle School into the new Langford-Tutt Middle School, and the closure of Murphey Middle School as its campus is redeveloped. The Richmond County System Board of education also plans to convert T.W. Josey Comprehensive High School into a districtwide College and Career Academy for grades 9–12.

Private schools in Augusta include Aquinas High School, Curtis Baptist High School, and Westminster Schools of Augusta.

== Media ==
The daily newspaper in the city is The Augusta Chronicle. Television stations serving Augusta and its metropolitan market are WJBF, channel 6 (ABC, with The CW Plus on DT2); WRDW, channel 12, (CBS); WCES, channel 20 (PBS); WAGT, channel 26 (NBC); and WFXG, channel 54 (Fox). Augusta's large medical community and patient population is served by the Medical Examiner (www.AugustaRx.com), a twice-monthly newspaper published since 2006.

== Infrastructure ==
=== Transportation ===
==== Major roads and expressways ====
- I-20 (Carl Sanders Highway)
- I-520 (Bobby Jones Expressway / Deputy James D. Paugh Memorial Highway)
- US 1 (Deans Bridge Road (from Jefferson County line to Gordon Highway); Gordon Highway (from Deans Bridge Road to South Carolina state line); Fall Line Freeway (from Jefferson County line to I-520))
- US 25 (Peach Orchard Road (entire length); Gordon Highway (from Peach Orchard Road to South Carolina state line))
- US 25 Bus. (Broad Street / 13th Street)
- US 78 / US 278 (Gordon Highway)
- SR 4 (follows US 1 from Jefferson County line to Gordon Highway; leaves Georgia at James U. Jackson Memorial Bridge)
- SR 28 (various roads, including John C. Calhoun Expressway and Washington Road)
- SR 56 (Mike Padgett Highway)
- SR 88 in southern Richmond County
- SR 104 (Washington Road; Pleasant Home Road; River Watch Parkway)
- SR 104 Conn. (Washington Road)
- SR 232 (Columbia Road / Bobby Jones Expressway)
- SR 383 (Jimmie Dyess Parkway)
- SR 540 (Fall Line Freeway (Deans Bridge Road from Jefferson County line to I-520))
- SR 555 / SR 565 (Savannah River Parkway (Peach Orchard Road from Burke County line to I-520))

Parts of Augusta are served by city transit service Augusta Public Transit (APT), but the main mode of transportation within the city is by car. Augusta is also served by a number of taxi companies.

==== Airports ====
The city has two airports: Augusta Regional Airport and Daniel Field. Augusta Regional Airport is served by two passenger airlines, including Delta Connection, which offers service to Atlanta, and American Eagle, which offers service to Charlotte, Dallas-Ft. Worth, and Washington D.C.

==== Rail ====
Until the 1960s, the city's Augusta Union Station was a passenger rail hub, with trains arriving from the Atlantic Coast Line (as spur sections from Florence, South Carolina, from trains such as the Champion, Everglades and Palmetto), Georgia Railroad and Southern Railway (for example, the Aiken-Augusta Special from New York City). The last Seaboard Coast Line (the successor to the Atlantic Coast Line) train was a Florence-Augusta section of the Champion; this section ended in 1970. The last train to the city was the unnamed daily in-state Georgia Railroad train between Atlanta and Augusta. This latter train, unofficially called the Georgia Cannonball, ran as a mixed train, until May 6, 1983. Most trains went to the Union Station at Barrett Square. The Southern Railway trains went to the Southern Railway depot at Fifth and Reynolds Street. Today, freight service is handled by Norfolk Southern Railway's Georgia Division and Piedmont Division through their Augusta Yard and Nixon Yard located near the city. Norfolk Southern Trains such as the NS 191 and 192 pass through Augusta's downtown as they "street run" at 5 mph (8 km/h) down 6th street. They also cross the old Trestle over the Savannah River entering and leaving South Carolina. CSX Transportation Atlanta Division and Florence Division Trains also serve the Augusta, Georgia, area from the CSX Augusta Yard near Gordon Highway southwest of the city.

==== Pedestrians and cycling ====
- Augusta Canal Historic Trail
- Riverwalk Augusta, a trail

=== Law enforcement ===
Law enforcement in Augusta is handled by the Richmond County Sheriff's Office.

== Sister cities ==
Augusta is twinned with:

- Biarritz, Pyrénées-Atlantiques, France
- Takarazuka, Hyōgo, Japan

== See also ==
- Arts and culture in Augusta, Georgia
- Media in Augusta, Georgia
- List of U.S. cities with large Black populations
- USS Augusta, 3 ships
