= USA Rugby South =

South Panthers
- Sport: Rugby union
- Founded: 1976
- USAR affiliation: 1976–1982

USA Rugby South is an organization that combines a number of unions in the south-east of the United States for competition and representative honours. Its representative team is known as the Panthers.

Originally formed as Southern Eastern Rugby Union in 1976, this representative team played against the North Eastern Rugby Union between 1976 and 1982.

USA Rugby South organizes inter-union competitions between champion teams from each geographical union, who go on to represent USA Rugby South at national competitions.

Since 2013, the USA Rugby South Panthers have competed in the NACRA Rugby Championship and were crowned champions in their first year, beating Trinidad and Tobago in the final.

There are currently seven member organisations associated with USA Rugby South.

== Squad ==
USA Rugby South squad for an exhibition game against Old Glory DC in June 2019.

Players	Club
Alex Turner	MTSU
Anton Moore	Savannah Shamrocks RFC
Blessing Motaung	USA Rugby South
Calvin Storey	Raleigh RFC
Cameron Tompkins	Nashville RFC
Colby Pearl	MTSU
David Caswell	USA Rugby South
Ernesto Silva	Augusta RFC
German Jalil	Miami Tridents
Irving Carcamo	Houston Sabercats
James Sheridan	Old Blue
Jeffrey Herron	Tampa Bay Krewe
Matt Fontana	Atlanta Renegades
Michael Martinez	Nashville RFC
Patrick Audino	NOVA
Reid Watkins	Birmingham Vulcans
Ross Depperschmidt	New Orleans Gold
Sam Trammel	Atlanta Renegades
Scott Weber	Pittsburgh Harlequins
Stephen Cappello	New Haven Old Black RFC
Steven Mendez	Pensacola Aviators
Tom Harty	Long Island RFC
William Waguespack	New Orleans Gold
Zach Blalock	Birmingham Vulcans
Zach Jessell	Pittsburgh Harlequins
Zach Miller	Southern Pines RFC
