= Augusta Technical College =

Technical college in Augusta, Georgia, U.S.

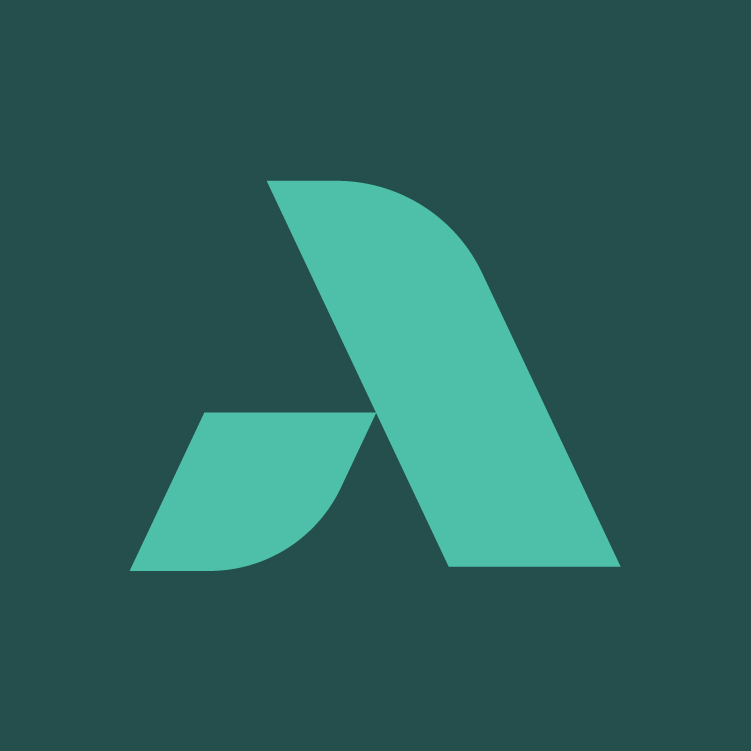
- Former names: Augusta Area Vocational-Technical School; Augusta Area Technical School; Augusta Technical Institute
- Motto: It's time
- Type: Public technical school
- Established: 1961
- Parent institution: Technical College System of Georgia
- Endowment: $4.9 million
- President: Dr. Jermaine Whirl
- Students: 4,455 (fall 2024)
- Location: Augusta, Grovetown, Thomson, and Waynesboro, Georgia, United States; 33.41833°N 82.05037°W (Augusta campus)
- Colors: Green and Mint
- Mascot: Cougar
- Website: www.augustatech.edu

Augusta Technical College (sometimes Augusta Tech) is a public technical school based in Augusta, Georgia. It was established in 1961 and is part of the Technical College System of Georgia. The school has three campuses, one in Augusta (Richmond County), another in Thomson (McDuffie County), and the third in Waynesboro (Burke County); a center in Grovetown (Columbia County); and has courses in cyber, digital education, and information technology at the Georgia Cyber Center in downtown Augusta. All campuses are accredited by the Southern Association of Colleges and Schools Commission on Colleges (SACSCOC).

== History ==
The school was founded in 1961 as the Augusta Area Vocational-Technical School. In 1966, the school merged with the Richmond Area Vocational School, and changed its name to the Augusta Area Technical School. In 1988, the name changed to Augusta Technical Institute. In 2000, the name changed to the current Augusta Technical College.

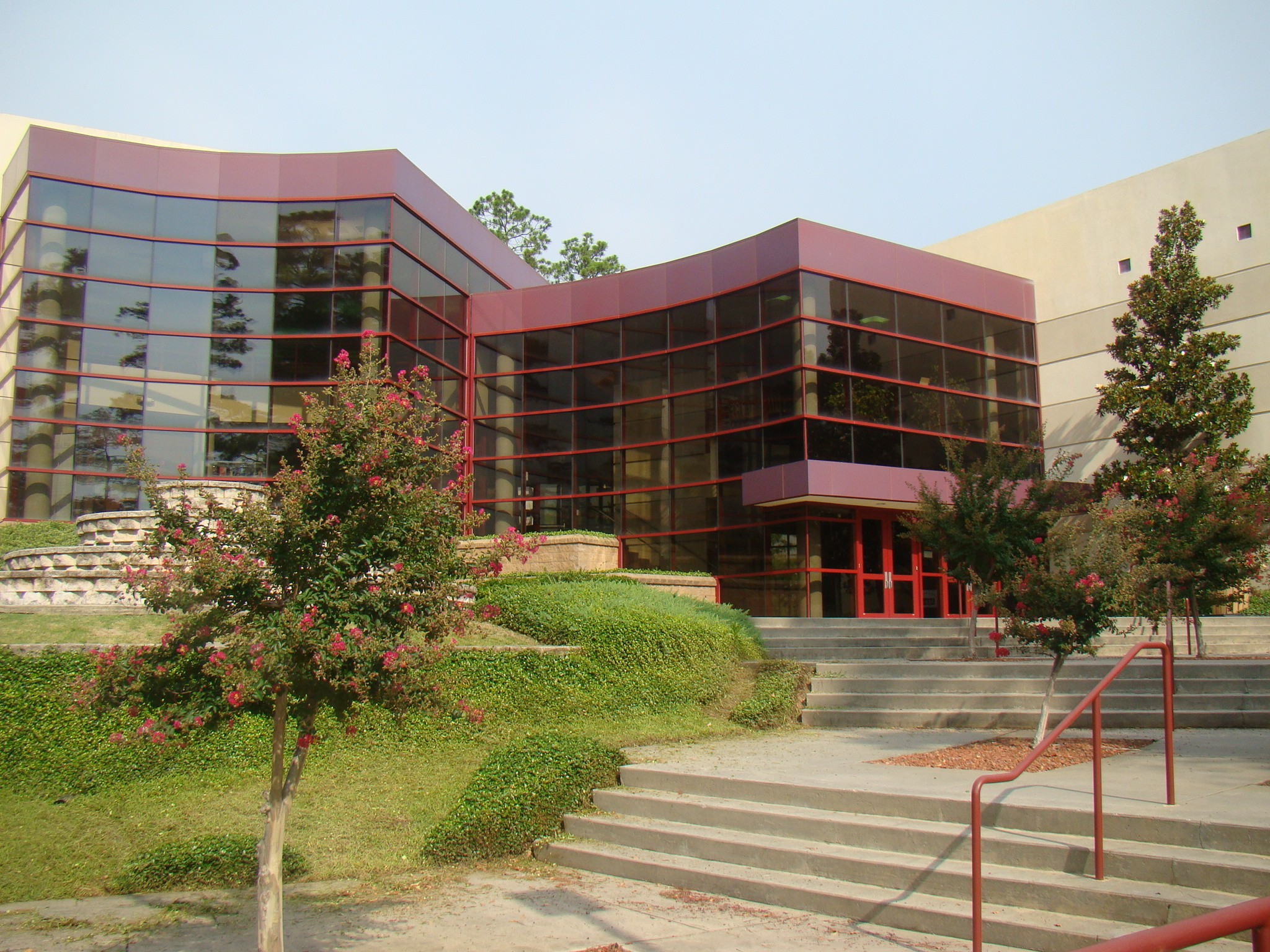
Jack Patrick Information Technology Center

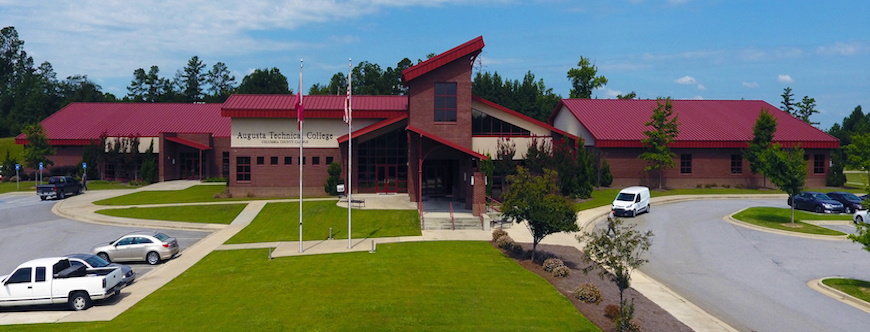
Augusta Technical College Columbia County Center

== Academics ==
Augusta Technical College academically offers 130+ programs of study within six academic schools.

- School of Arts & Sciences
- School of Aviation, Industrial, and Engineering Technology
- School of Business
- School of Cyber and Design Media
- School of Health Sciences
- School of Public and Professional Services

Academically, the institution offers associate of science, and associates of applied sciences degrees, diplomas, and technical certificates of credit.
