= National Cyber Range Complex =

The National Cyber Range Complex (NCRC) is an integrated cyber range capability operated by the Department of Defense (DoD) Test Resource Management Center (TRMC). It is an enterprise solution that provides DoD and other government and industry users with representative environments; secure, distributed network infrastructure/connectivity; and other tools and services to support cybersecurity testing and evaluation, research and development, mission rehearsal, and workforce training events.

NCRC creates environments that replicate DoD systems and Red/Blue/Gray (i.e., adversarial/friendly/neutral) networked environments, and range in size from simple environments with a handful of endpoints to large-scale, intricate environments with complex routing topologies and thousands of endpoints. Endpoints can be “bare metal” or virtualized, allowing for environments to represent real-world systems at varying degrees of fidelity depending on event requirements. The NCRC staff applies its cybersecurity and cyber engineering expertise to provide event environments with the necessary fidelity and realism to support cyber-related testing and the development of cyber-related tactics, techniques, and procedures (TTP) to meet user requirements.

NCRC provides a broad spectrum of support tailored to meet specific user and event needs. This support ranges from Infrastructure as a Service (IaaS), to Platform as a Service (PaaS), to Testing and Training as a Service (TaaS) support. IaaS includes basic network, compute, and storage services, as well as the NCRC’s security architecture, which provides isolation between event environments. PaaS adds networking complexity, configured operating systems, end-point services and applications, and other elements as needed. TaaS is a turnkey offering that includes full-service event planning, design, execution, analysis, and reporting, and may include bespoke elements such as customized instrumentation or opposing forces (OPFOR) activities. Users can participate in these events from multiple locations—NCRC locations or otherwise—via secure, distributed network infrastructure.

NCRC test events support DoD acquisition programs, including major acquisition programs (ACAT 1 programs) and Director, Operational Test and Evaluation (DOT&E) oversight programs; offensive and defensive cyber test and evaluation programs; and programs that support rapid capability fielding, among others. They are generally conducted within a real-world mission scenario and incorporate dynamic feedback and user involvement. They provide decision makers and program managers with actionable information and frame potential vulnerabilities in terms of likelihood and impact on mission capability and effectiveness. NCRC training events support Combatant Command (COCOM) exercises, COCOM partner and multinational events, integrated intelligence environments, and Red Force on Blue Force training. NCRC also supports cyber table top (CTT) wargames, which focus on identifying a system’s vulnerabilities and determining whether offensive cyber activities could affect how the system functions.

NCRC also has a cyber workforce and capability development focus. NCRC partners with academia to provide potential solutions to “Innovation Challenges” to fill cyber T&E capability gaps and provide insight into emerging technologies. NCRC intends to extend and enhance its cyberspace T&E infrastructure through partnerships with key stakeholders across DoD, the Department of Homeland Security (DHS), industry, and academia. NCRC also provides an unclassified instance and workspace for test environments that lowers the barrier for entry for non-traditional defense contractors.

The NCRC has cyber range facilities in multiple locations, including Orlando, FL; Charleston, SC; Fort Walton Beach, FL; Patuxent River, MD; Huntsville, AL; Augusta, GA; and Oahu, HI.

== History ==
The National Cyber Range (NCR) originated from a conceptual initiative within the Defense Advanced Research Projects Agency (DARPA) during the early twenty-first century. The original concept was developed by Dr. Michael VanPutte while serving as a program manager at DARPA. Recognizing the growing strategic importance of cyberspace as an operational domain, Dr. VanPutte proposed the creation of a dedicated environment where cyber capabilities could be rigorously tested, evaluated, and demonstrated under controlled conditions.

The concept received formal approval from then–DARPA Director Dr. Tony Tether, who endorsed the initiative as a necessary step in advancing both defensive and offensive cyber capabilities for national security. Following this approval, the program was formally announced to industry and academia through DARPA Broad Agency Announcement BAA-43, which solicited proposals for the development of a new type of cyber testing infrastructure.

From its inception, the National Cyber Range was not envisioned as a full-scale replica of the global internet or a massive operational network. Instead, its architects deliberately pursued a more focused and manageable approach. The initial plan called for the construction of a smaller, highly instrumented testbed consisting of fewer than 1,000 nodes. This design decision emphasized flexibility, repeatability, and analytical rigor rather than sheer scale. By concentrating on quality of simulation and depth of measurement, the NCR aimed to transform how cyber capabilities were evaluated.

The underlying philosophy of the NCR reflected a broader concern among senior defense leaders. Many decision-makers remained cautious about the reliability and effectiveness of cyber operations, in part because they lacked a trusted, unbiased mechanism for evaluating both defensive and offensive cyber tools. The NCR was designed to address this gap directly. It provided a neutral environment where capabilities could be assessed through repeatable experimentation, structured scenarios, and comprehensive data collection.

In conceptual terms, the NCR drew inspiration from established military training and evaluation models, particularly the United States Army’s National Training Center (NTC) at Fort Irwin, California. Just as the NTC provided a realistic and instrumented environment for evaluating conventional forces, the NCR sought to create a comparable framework for cyberspace operations. By applying similar principles of controlled experimentation, after-action analysis, and objective assessment, the NCR aimed to build confidence among senior leaders and operational planners in the emerging domain of cyber warfare.

As development progressed, the National Cyber Range began to reshape not only technical testing capabilities but also the processes by which cyber systems were evaluated. It introduced structured experimentation, standardized metrics, and repeatable methodologies that enabled more rigorous assessment of cyber tools and strategies. In doing so, the NCR played a foundational role in establishing cyberspace as a domain in which capabilities could be measured, compared, and trusted through empirical evaluation rather than assumption.

== See also ==
- Virginia Cyber Range, funded by the Commonwealth of Virginia
