= National Register of Historic Places listings in Richmond County, Georgia =

Map of Georgia with Richmond County highlighted

This is a list of properties and districts in Richmond County, Georgia that are listed on the National Register of Historic Places (NRHP).

Augusta-Richmond was formed by merger of the independent city of Augusta, Georgia and Richmond County, Georgia.

This National Park Service list is complete through NPS recent listings posted April 24, 2026.

== Current listings ==
	Name on the Register	Image	Date listed	Location	City or town	Description
1	Academy of Richmond County	Academy of Richmond County	April 11, 1973 (#73000639)	540 Telfair St. 33°28′12″N 81°57′45″W	Augusta	
2	Academy of Richmond County-1926 Campus	Academy of Richmond County-1926 Campus	January 28, 2004 (#03001491)	910 Russell St. 33°28′25″N 82°00′17″W	Augusta	
3	Augusta Canal Industrial District	Augusta Canal Industrial District	May 27, 1971 (#71000285)	Along the west bank of the Savannah River from the Richmond-Columbia county line to 10th and Fenwick Sts. 33°29′51″N 81°59′47″W	Augusta	National Historic Landmark (canal and historic district), extends into Columbia County
4	Augusta Cotton Exchange Building	Augusta Cotton Exchange Building	July 20, 1978 (#78001003)	Reynolds St. 33°28′35″N 81°57′53″W	Augusta	
5	Augusta Downtown Historic District	Augusta Downtown Historic District	June 11, 2004 (#04000515)	Roughly bounded by 13th St., Gordon Hwy., Walton Way and the Savannah R. 33°28′18″N 81°57′50″W	Augusta	
6	Augusta Warehouse and Compress Company		March 4, 2024 (#100010016)	1812 Slaton Street; 33°27′44″N 82°00′12″W	Augusta	
7	Bath Presbyterian Church and Cemetery	Bath Presbyterian Church and Cemetery	October 27, 2004 (#04001179)	Edie Bath Rd., 0.5 miles (0.80 km) west of US Route 1; 33°20′11″N 82°10′22″W	Blythe	
8	Stephen Vincent Benet House	Stephen Vincent Benet House	November 11, 1971 (#71000286)	2500 Walton Way; 33°28′33″N 82°01′27″W	Augusta	National Historic Landmark
9	Bethlehem Historic District	Bethlehem Historic District	December 1, 1997 (#97001470)	Roughly bounded by Wrightsboro Rd., MLK Jr. Blvd., Railroad, Poplar, and Clay Sts. 33°27′32″N 81°59′05″W	Augusta	
10	Brahe House	Brahe House	April 11, 1973 (#73000640)	456 Telfair St. 33°28′09″N 81°57′37″W	Augusta	
11	Broad Street Historic District	Broad Street Historic District	April 28, 1980 (#80001226)	Broad St. between 5th and 13th Sts. 33°28′30″N 81°58′02″W	Augusta	
12	Cauley-Wheeler Memorial Building		June 4, 2008 (#08000493)	1339 Laney Walker Blvd. 33°28′01″N 81°58′58″W	Augusta	Demolished in 2011
13	Church of the Most Holy Trinity	Church of the Most Holy Trinity	March 21, 1997 (#97000250)	720 Telfair St. 33°28′18″N 81°58′01″W	Augusta	
14	College Hill	College Hill	November 11, 1971 (#71000287)	2216 Wrightsboro Rd. 33°28′00″N 82°00′48″W	Augusta	National Historic Landmark
15	Joseph Darling House	Joseph Darling House	April 18, 1991 (#91000479)	3066 Dennis Rd. 33°31′41″N 82°02′55″W	Martinez	
16	Engine Company Number One	Engine Company Number One	May 25, 1988 (#88000565)	452 Ellis St. 33°28′17″N 81°57′34″W	Augusta	
17	First Baptist Church of Augusta	First Baptist Church of Augusta	March 23, 1972 (#72000397)	Greene and 8th Sts. 33°28′21″N 81°58′03″W	Augusta	
18	First Presbyterian Church of Augusta	First Presbyterian Church of Augusta	February 21, 1997 (#97000100)	642 Telfair St. 33°28′13″N 81°57′54″W	Augusta	
19	FitzSimons-Hampton House	FitzSimons-Hampton House	October 29, 1976 (#76000645)	SR 28; 33°26′59″N 81°55′17″W	Augusta	
20	Fruitlands	Fruitlands	May 25, 1979 (#79000742)	2604 Washington Rd. 33°30′03″N 82°01′20″W	Augusta	Clubhouse of the Augusta National Golf Club - admission only to members and ticket holders to tournaments
21	Gertrude Herbert Art Institute	Gertrude Herbert Art Institute	March 20, 1973 (#73000641)	506 Telfair St. 33°28′11″N 81°57′41″W	Augusta	
22	Gould-Weed House	Gould-Weed House	July 16, 1979 (#79000743)	828 Milledge Rd. 33°28′35″N 82°00′46″W	Augusta	
23	Greene Street Historic District	Greene Street Historic District	December 3, 1980 (#80001227)	Greene St. 33°28′25″N 81°58′05″W	Augusta	
24	Harris-Pearson-Walker House	Harris-Pearson-Walker House	October 28, 1969 (#69000052)	1822 Broad St. 33°29′04″N 81°59′42″W	Augusta	
25	Harrisburg-West End Historic District	Harrisburg-West End Historic District	June 7, 1990 (#90000802)	Roughly bounded by 15th St., Walton Way, Heard Ave., Milledge Rd., and the Augusta Canal; 33°28′55″N 81°59′50″W	Augusta	
26	Dr. Asbury and Martha Hull House	Dr. Asbury and Martha Hull House	September 18, 2018 (#100002961)	2749 Hillcrest Ave. 33°28′40″N 82°01′59″W	Augusta	
27	Lamar Building	Lamar Building	April 24, 1979 (#79000744)	753 Broad St. 33°28′31″N 81°57′54″W	Augusta	
28	Joseph Rucker Lamar Boyhood Home	Joseph Rucker Lamar Boyhood Home	June 13, 1996 (#96000598)	415 7th St. 33°28′19″N 81°57′55″W	Augusta	
29	Laney-Walker North Historic District	Laney-Walker North Historic District	September 5, 1985 (#85001976)	Bounded by D'Antignac, 7th, Twiggs, Phillips and Harrison Sts., Walton Way and Laney Walker Blvd. 33°28′01″N 81°58′29″W	Augusta	
30	Liberty Methodist Church	Liberty Methodist Church	November 7, 1997 (#97001330)	2040 Liberty Church Rd. 33°19′12″N 82°02′17″W	Hephzibah	
31	Meadow Garden	Meadow Garden	July 19, 1976 (#76000646)	1230 Nelson St. 33°28′26″N 81°58′47″W	Augusta	Home of George Walton, youngest signer of the U.S. Declaration of Independence, a National Historic Landmark
32	Neuropsychiatric Infirmary – Building 76		December 7, 2020 (#100005884)	1798 Maryland Ave., Charlie Norwood VA Medical Center; 33°27′58″N 82°01′45″W	Augusta	
33	Neuropsychiatric Tuberculosis Ward-Building 7		December 7, 2020 (#100005883)	1900 Maryland Ave., Charlie Norwood VA Medical Center; 33°27′51″N 82°01′46″W	Augusta	
34	Old Medical College Building	Old Medical College Building	March 16, 1972 (#72000398)	Telfair and 6th Sts. 33°28′13″N 81°57′47″W	Augusta	National Historic Landmark
35	Old Richmond County Courthouse	Old Richmond County Courthouse	December 22, 1978 (#78001004)	432 Telfair St. 33°28′09″N 81°57′34″W	Augusta	
36	Paine College Historic District		December 26, 2012 (#12001082)	1235 15th St. 33°28′10″N 81°59′35″W	Augusta	
37	Pinched Gut Historic District	Pinched Gut Historic District	March 6, 1980 (#80001228)	Roughly bounded by Gordon Hwy., E. Boundary, Reynolds, and Gwinnett Sts. 33°27′47″N 81°57′22″W	Augusta	
38	Reid-Jones-Carpenter House	Reid-Jones-Carpenter House	November 13, 1979 (#79000745)	2249 Walton Way; 33°28′41″N 82°00′56″W	Augusta	
39	Sacred Heart Catholic Church	Sacred Heart Catholic Church	March 16, 1972 (#72000399)	Greene and 13th Sts. 33°28′38″N 81°58′37″W	Augusta	
40	Sand Hills Historic District	Sand Hills Historic District	July 9, 1997 (#97000754)	Roughly bounded by Monte Sano and North View Aves., Mount Auburn St., Johns Rd., and the Augusta Country Club. 33°29′00″N 82°01′13″W	Augusta	Historic African-American neighborhood
41	Seclusaval and Windsor Spring	Seclusaval and Windsor Spring	October 11, 1988 (#87001331)	Junction of Windsor Spring and Tobacco Rds. 33°23′05″N 82°04′21″W	Hephzibah	
42	Shiloh Orphanage	Shiloh Orphanage	December 30, 1996 (#96001500)	1635 15th St. 33°27′32″N 81°59′55″W	Augusta	
43	Springfield Baptist Church	Springfield Baptist Church	June 17, 1982 (#82002461)	112 12th St. (original) and 114 12th St. (increase); 33°28′43″N 81°58′18″W	Augusta	There was a boundary increase on July 5, 1990 (refnum 90000979)
44	St. Paul's Episcopal Church	St. Paul's Episcopal Church	April 11, 1973 (#73000642)	6th and Reynolds Sts. 33°28′33″N 81°57′42″W	Augusta	
45	Summerville Historic District	Summerville Historic District	May 22, 1980 (#80001229)	Roughly bounded by Milledge Lane, Wrightsboro Rd., Highland and Heard Aves., Cumming and Henry Sts. 33°28′32″N 82°01′07″W	Augusta	
46	Tubman High School	Tubman High School	March 7, 1994 (#94000154)	1740 Walton Way; 33°28′25″N 81°59′51″W	Augusta	
47	United States Post Office and Courthouse	United States Post Office and Courthouse	January 21, 2000 (#99001648)	500 E. Ford St. 33°28′20″N 81°58′03″W	Augusta	
48	Weiss-Steinburg-Bush House	Weiss-Steinburg-Bush House	July 2, 2019 (#100004115)	1300 Buena Vista Rd. 33°28′28″N 82°02′18″W	Augusta	
49	Woodrow Wilson Boyhood Home	Woodrow Wilson Boyhood Home	February 28, 1979 (#79000746)	419 7th St. 33°28′18″N 81°57′54″W	Augusta	National Historic Landmark
50	Woodlawn Historic District		July 2, 2019 (#100004122)	Roughly bounded by Walton Way, Emmett St., Wrightsboro Rd., and Heard Ave. 33°28′12″N 82°00′18″W	Augusta	
