= Augusta Downtown Historic District =

Historic district in Georgia, United States

- U.S. National Register of Historic Places
- U.S. Historic district
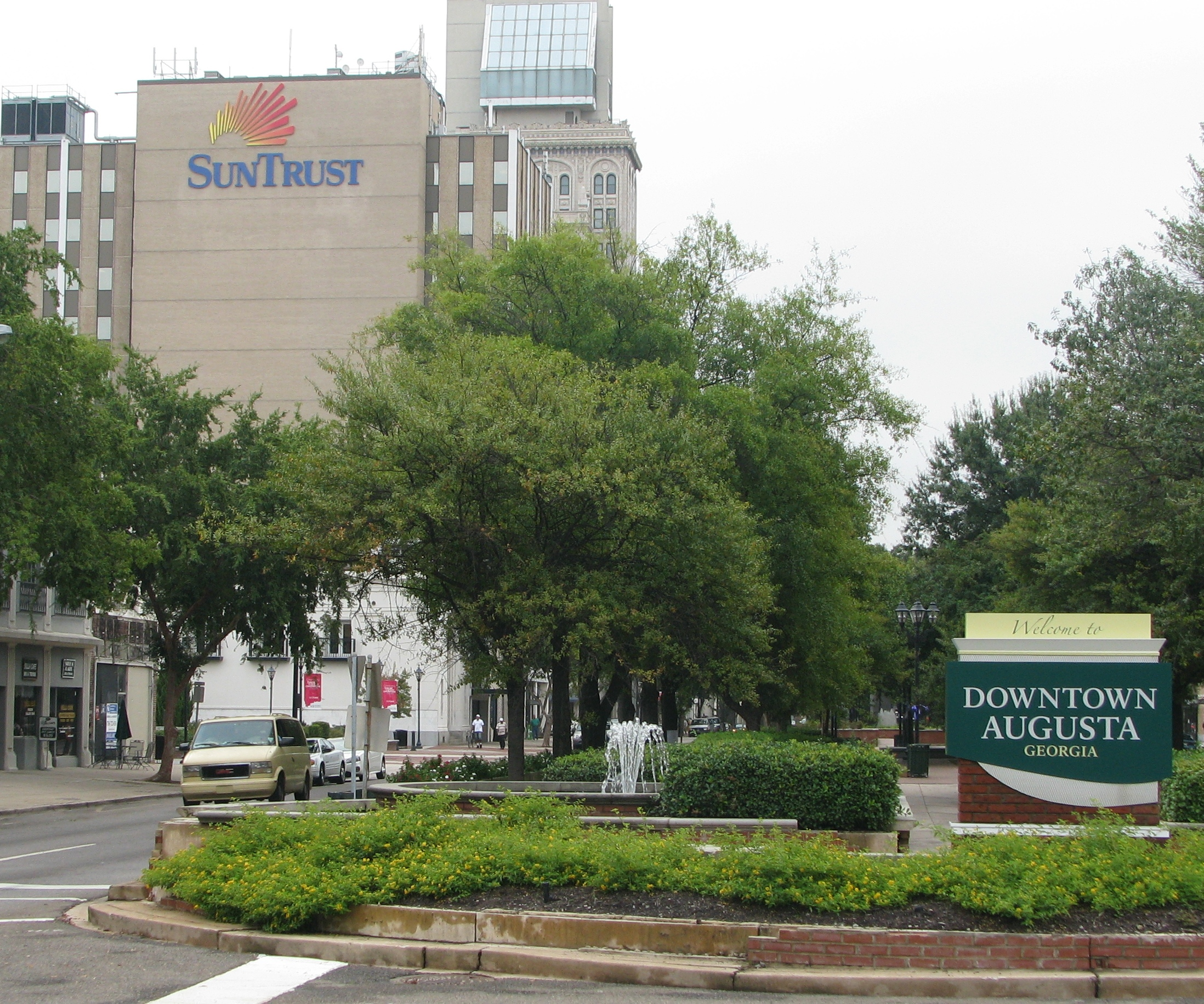
- Broad Street

- Location within Georgia Location within the United States
- Location: Bounded by Gordon Hwy., 13 St., Augusta Canal, and the Savannah River
- Coordinates: 33°28′18″N 81°57′50″W
- Architect: Multiple
- Architectural style: Greek, Italianate, Gothic Revival, Federal, Victorian, Queen Anne, Second Empire, Beaux Arts, Romanesque, Classical, Craftsman, Art Deco, and International
- NRHP reference No.: 04000515
- Added to NRHP: June 11, 2004

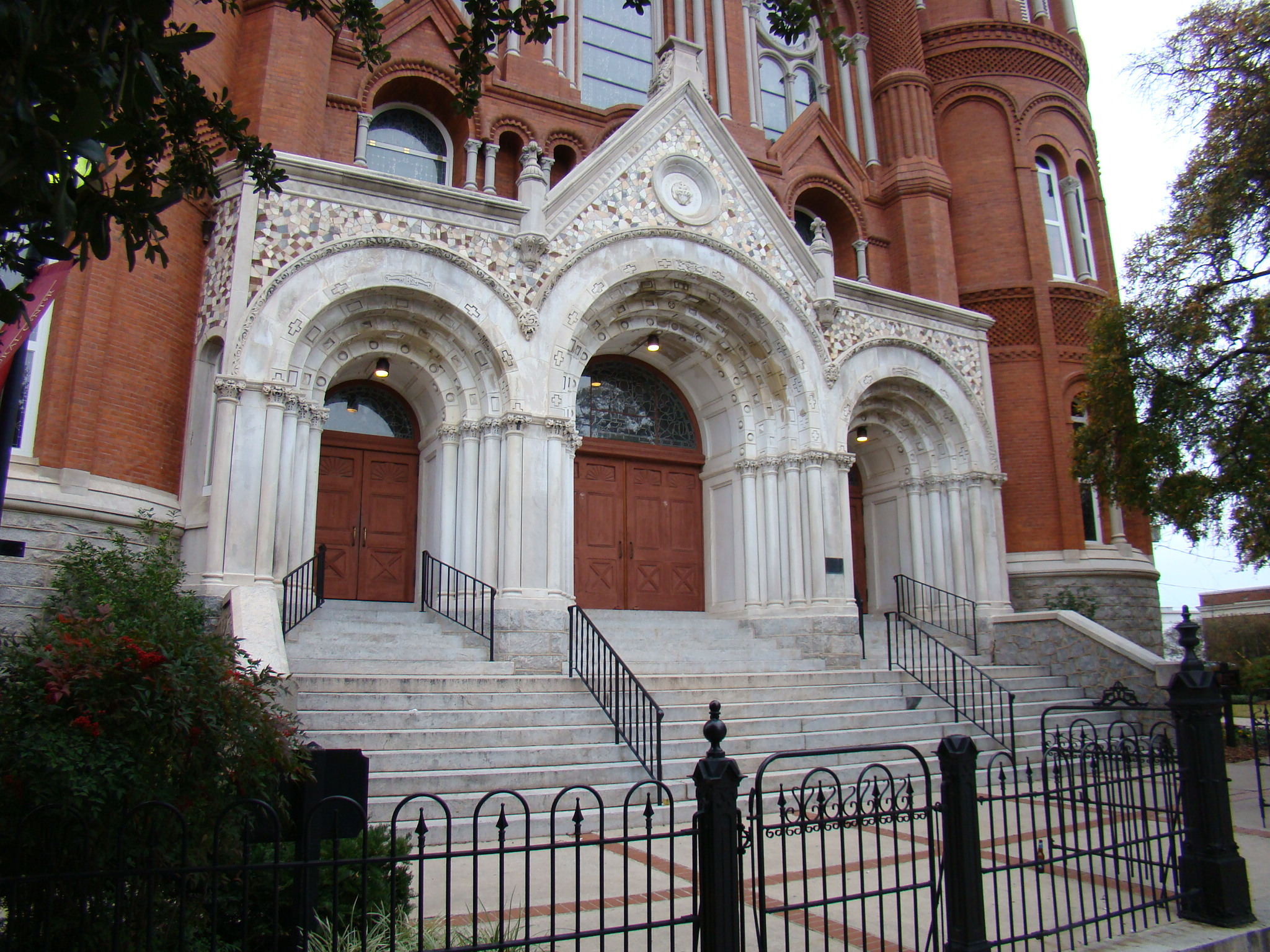
Sacred Heart Cultural Center

Augusta Downtown Historic District is a historic district that encompasses most of Downtown Augusta, Georgia and its pre-Civil War area.

It was listed on the National Register of Historic Places in 2004.

== Notable historic sites ==
Downtown Augusta is home to many historical sites. Some of these include:

- Academy of Richmond County - 1801 campus— Designed by Richard Clarke, completed in 1801-2 and was the first educational institute in the state. The two original buildings on Bay Street were wood-framed, and their deterioration led to the construction of the Telfair Street campus.
- Augusta Cotton Exchange Building— built in the 1880s at the height of cotton production and trade in Augusta. Now a branch of Georgia Bank and Trust.
- Church of the Most Holy Trinity
- Congregation of B'nai Israel Synagogue - Opened in 1869 and the oldest standing synagogue in Georgia.
- First Baptist Church of Augusta
- First Presbyterian Church
- Gertrude Herbert Institute of Art— Founded in 1937 and is the only independent non-profit visual arts school in the Augusta-Aiken metropolitan area.
- Lamar Building— Built in 1913 and, with 16 floors, is the third tallest building in Augusta. It was designed by architect William Lee Stoddart.
- Old Government House— Housed the seat of the local government from 1801 to 1821. Now a reception hall.
- Old Medical College of Georgia Building— Housed the Medical College of Georgia from 1835 to 1913. Now a conference and events center for the medical school.
- Sacred Heart Cultural Center— Built in 1900 and is a former Roman Catholic church. Now an events center.
- St. Paul's Episcopal Church— Founded in 1750, it is the oldest church in Augusta. Was burned to the ground in 1916 with many other buildings. It was rebuilt in 1919.
- United States Post Office and Courthouse

Downtown Augusta contains a large amount of historical homes, many being built in the 19th century. Some of these homes include:

- Brahe House
- Joseph Rucker Lamar Boyhood Home— Lamar resided here when he was studying law.
- Phinizy Residence
- Platt Fleming Walker d'Antignac House
- Woodrow Wilson Boyhood Home— The residence of Woodrow Wilson until the age of 14.
- Zachary Daniels House

== See also ==
- Broad Street Historic District (Augusta, Georgia)
- History of Augusta, Georgia
