= Cunningham-Coleman House =

Historic house in Georgia, US

- U.S. National Register of Historic Places
- Location within Georgia
- Nearest city: Wadley, Georgia
- Coordinates: 32°50′44″N 82°20′44″W
- Area: 4 acres (1.6 ha)
- Built: 1830
- Architectural style: Greek Revival
- NRHP reference No.: 84001119
- Added to NRHP: September 7, 1984

The Cunningham-Coleman House, in Jefferson County, Georgia near Wadley, Georgia, was built in 1830. It was listed on the National Register of Historic Places in 1984. It is apparently on Leaptrott Road.

It was deemed significant "as a fine example of a Sand Hills cottage with Greek Revival detailing in a rural setting. It is raised, for ventilation, and has a two-over-four floor plan with a very wide central hall, which was again used for ventilation as well as circulation. Greek Revival details include the columned front porch, use of pilasters to mark the front entrance, boxed cornice, and the trabeated front entrance with its sidelights and transom. The windows have small pediments on the exterior, as do those on the interior of the first floor. One unusual architectural feature found in the house is that the sidelights and transom open for ventilation and appear to be original. The stairway also contains a very unusual curved baseboard at its first turn. The house is significant in agriculture and local history as the center of a representative middle-sized, antebellum cotton plantation run by the Marshall-Daniel(s) families, and for the post-bellum role William Armstrong Cunningham of Maryland played in the local area after purchasing the farm in 1869. The nearby area became known as "Cunningham Corner (s)" for him and his family. After his death in 1892, his widow sold the farm and house in 1895 to John C. Coleman (1844-1923) of adjacent Emanuel County, who was prominent as a merchant, realtor, and public official."

It is located southeast of Wadley on what in 1984 was an un-numbered dirt road, about 3 miles (4.8 km) east of U.S. Route 1. In 2019, the coordinates given in NRIS are for a house located on Leaptrott Road, a road which goes on to Gambrell Lake and dead-ends.
