= Augusta Cotton Exchange Building =

- U.S. National Register of Historic Places
- U.S. Historic district – Contributing property
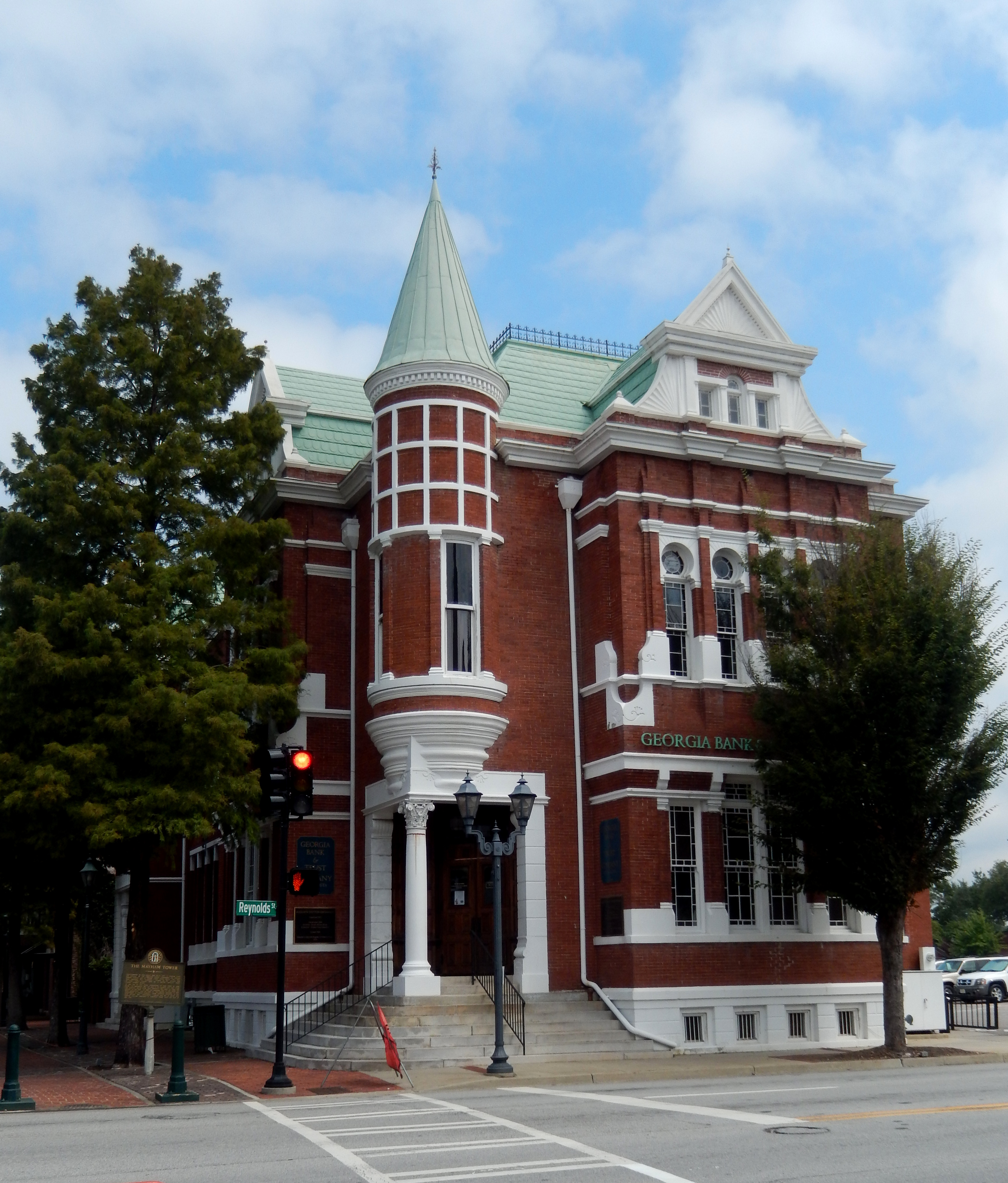

- Location within Georgia Location within the United States
- Location: Reynolds Street, Augusta, Georgia
- Coordinates: 33°28′35″N 81°57′53″W
- Area: less than one acre
- Built: 1886
- Architectural style: Second Empire, Queen Anne
- NRHP reference No.: 78001003
- Added to NRHP: July 20, 1978

Augusta Cotton Exchange Building is a historic building in Augusta, Georgia. It was designed by Enoch William Brown and built in the mid-1880s during a cotton boom. The structure includes ornate details and ironwork and is considered High Victorian architecture. Materials for its construction were supplied locally by Charles F. Lombard's foundry. It was added to the National Register of Historic Places on July 20, 1978. It is located on Reynolds Street.

The exchange was organized for the cotton trade. It housed brokers and a trading floor. Women were excluded and off hours cockfights and Saturday football meetups took place.

The building is part of the Augusta Downtown Historic District and Augusta Canal National Monument Heritage Area. Bill Moore of Aiken, South Carolina purchased and restored the building in 1988. The building has been used by the Augusta Metropolitan Convention and Visitors Bureau as a Welcome Center and is now a branch of South State Bank.

== See also ==
- National Register of Historic Places listings in Richmond County, Georgia
