= Joseph Rucker Lamar Boyhood Home =

Historic house in Georgia, United States

- U.S. National Register of Historic Places
- U.S. Historic district – Contributing property
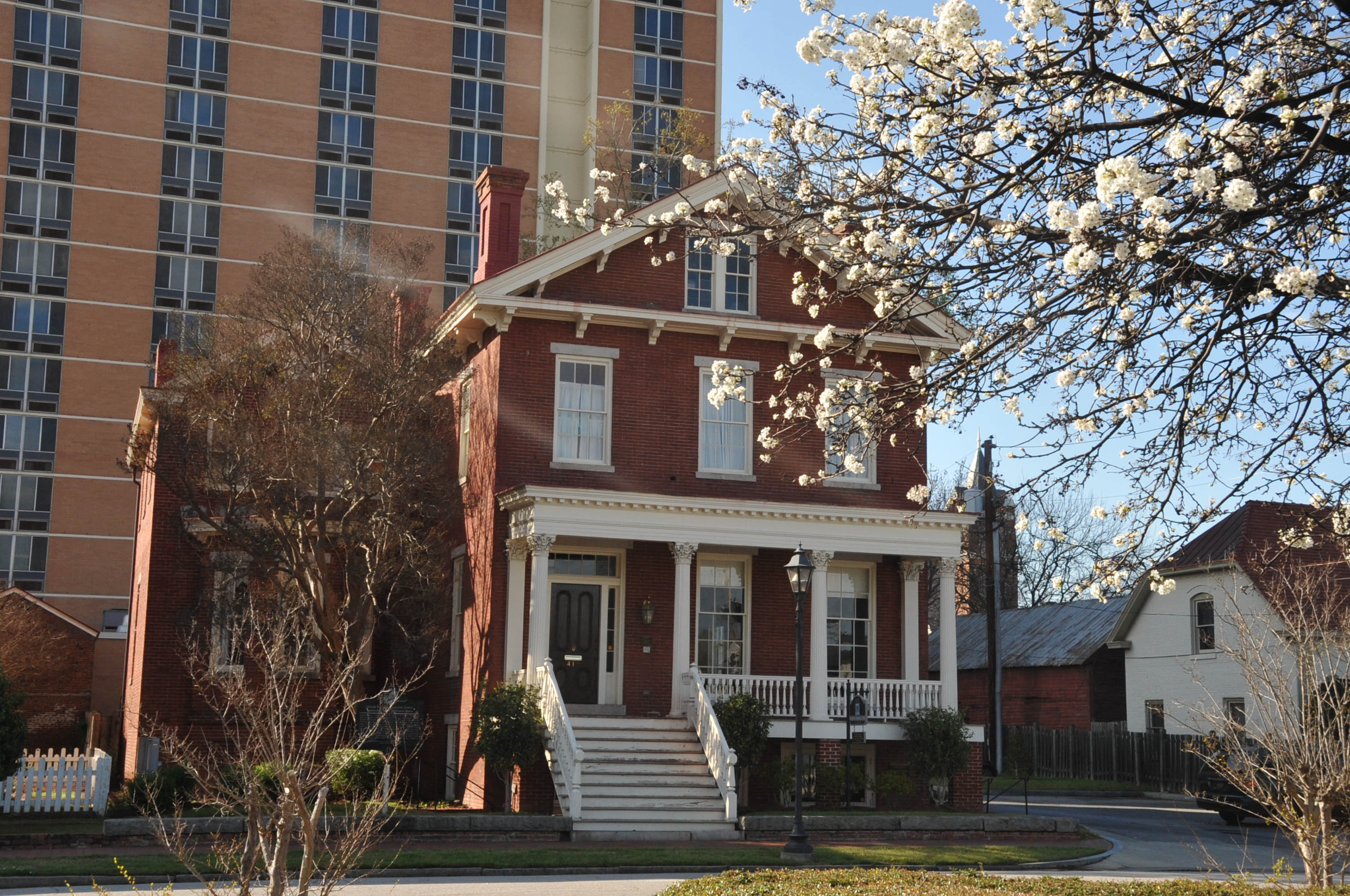

- Location within Georgia Location within the United States
- Location: 415 7th St., Augusta, Georgia
- Coordinates: 33°28′19″N 81°57′55″W
- Area: less than one acre
- Built: 1860
- Built by: William H. Salisbury
- Architectural style: Italianate
- NRHP reference No.: 96000598
- Added to NRHP: June 13, 1996

Joseph Rucker Lamar Boyhood Home is the boyhood home of Joseph Rucker Lamar in Augusta, Georgia. Lamar served as Justice of the United States Supreme Court. The home was added to the National Register of Historic Places on June 13, 1996. It is located at 415 7th Street. The house was constructed in 1860. It is located in the Augusta Downtown Historic District, is the headquarters of Historic Augusta, and is used as a visitors center for the Boyhood Home of Woodrow Wilson.

== See also ==
- National Register of Historic Places listings in Richmond County, Georgia
