= Sand Hills cottage architecture =

Sand Hills cottage architecture is a modified form of Greek Revival architecture which developed in the Sandhills area of the U.S. state of South Carolina.

The form has symmetry, wide entablatures, and classic columns of the Greek Revival style. It may include Greek Revival front doorway details, such as having a rectangular transom with side lights. But if it has a "one-story, high-pitched side gable roof, three gable dormers, and a full-facade porch" then it would be characterized as the Sand Hills variation. Seclusaval is "an excellent example" of this type.

Examples include:

- Seclusaval and Windsor Spring (1843) in Richmond County, Georgia
- Brahe House (1850) in Richmond County
- Cunningham-Coleman House (c.1830s) in Jefferson County, Georgia
- Meadow Garden (1791) in Augusta, Georgia (now Augusta–Richmond County)
- Asa May House (1836) Jefferson County, Florida
