= College Hill (Augusta, Georgia) =

- U.S. National Register of Historic Places
- U.S. National Historic Landmark
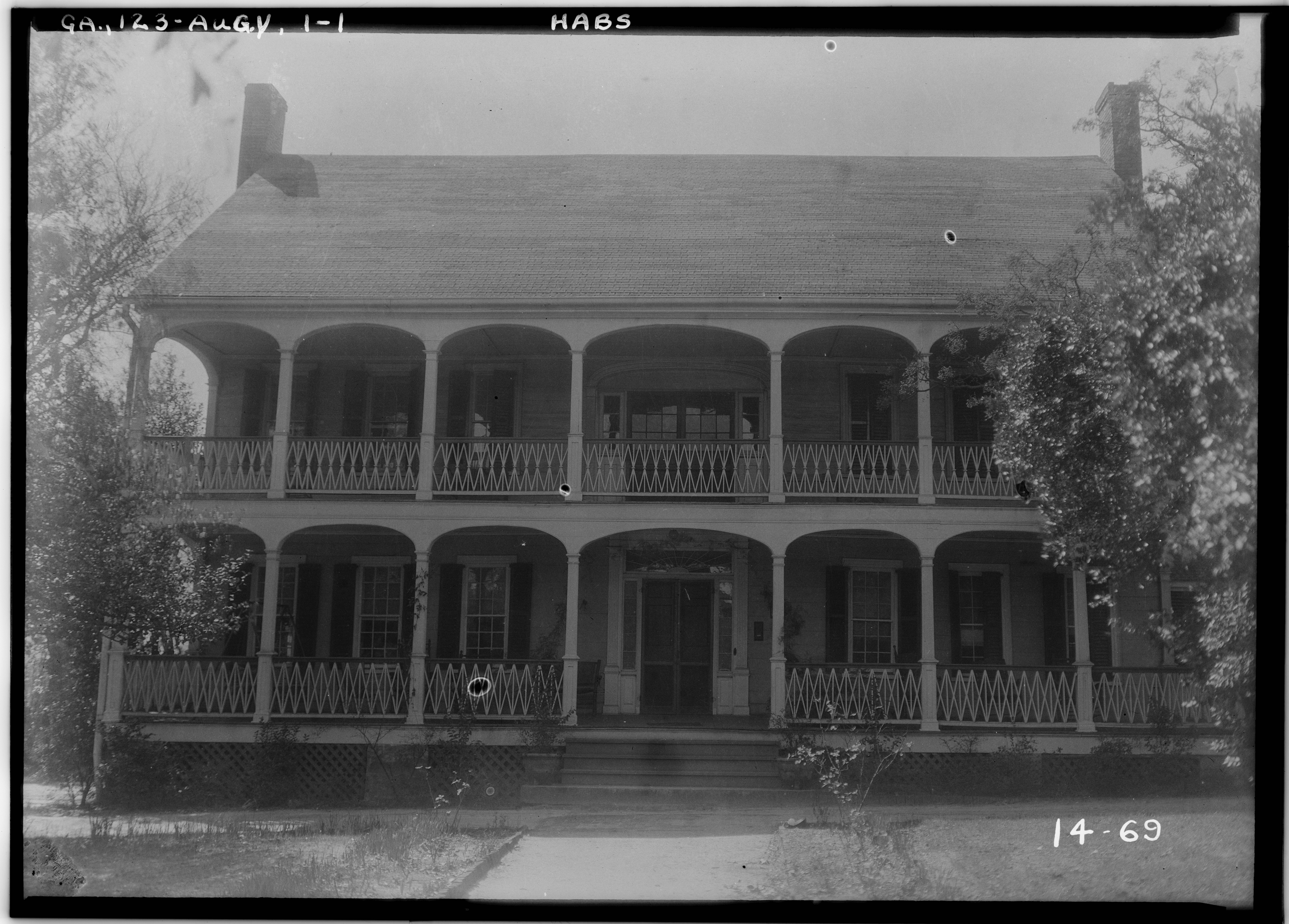
- 1934 HABS photograph

- Location within Georgia Location within the United States
- Location: 2216 Wrightsboro Rd., Augusta, Georgia
- Coordinates: 33.46678°N 82.01322°W
- Area: 6 acres (2.4 ha)
- Built: 1795
- NRHP reference No.: 71000287

Significant dates
- Added to NRHP: November 11, 1971
- Designated NHL: November 11, 1971

College Hill, also known as George Walton House, Harper House, or Walton-Harper House, is a historic house at 2116 Wrightsboro Road in Augusta, Georgia. It was built in 1795, and was the home George Walton, a signer of the United States Declaration of Independence, from then until his death in 1804. It was declared a National Historic Landmark in 1971. It is a private residence, and is not open to the public.

== Description and history ==
The Walton House is located on the south side of Wrightsboro Road, about 2 miles (3.2 km) west of downtown Augusta. It is set on a secluded 6-acre (2.4 ha) estate, all that is left of the 100 acres (40 ha) it was originally associated with. It is a two-story wood-frame structure, with a gabled roof, clapboard siding, and a pair of brick chimneys near the ends. The main facade, seven bays wide, is adorned with a two-story veranda, the sections each consisting of a segmented arch supported by slender square columns. Entrances at each level are located at the center, with flanking sidelight windows and pilasters, and fanlight windows above.

In 1787, the state of Georgia granted George Walton 100 acres outside Augusta for his services to the state. Walton had "College Hill" built on this land in 1795, moving there from Meadow Garden. The house has been in the hands of his descendants (named Harper) since then. Walton served the state in a variety of important capacities: trained as a lawyer, he served in the Continental Congress (1776–81) and in the Georgia militia, in whose service he was captured by the British during the 1778 Capture of Savannah. Exchanged and released, he was soon afterward elected Governor of Georgia, an office he held from November 1779 to January 1780. He also served as the state's Chief Justice, and in a second term as Governor 1789–80. He died at College Hill in 1804.

== See also ==
- List of National Historic Landmarks in Georgia (U.S. state)
- National Register of Historic Places listings in Richmond County, Georgia
