= Shiloh Orphanage =

- U.S. National Register of Historic Places
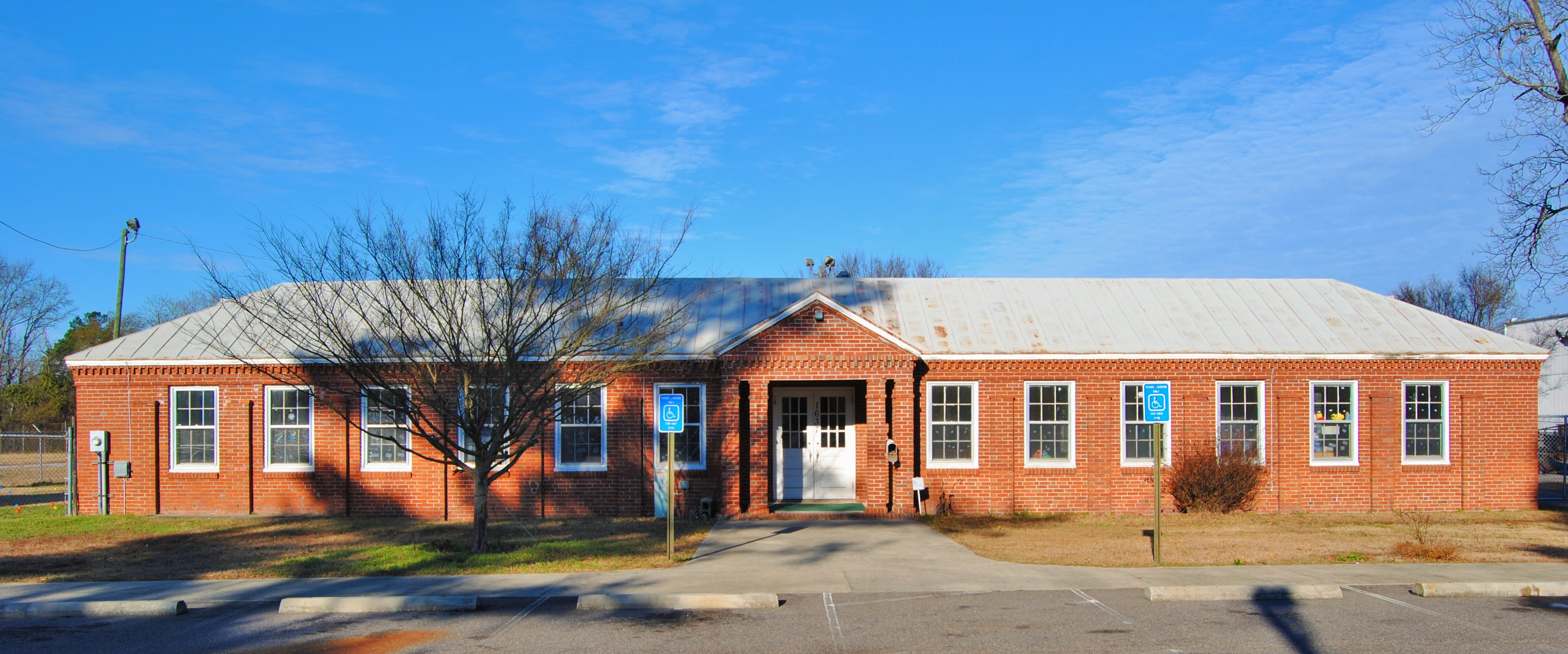

- Location within Georgia Location within the United States
- Location: 1635 15th St., Augusta, Georgia
- Coordinates: 33°27′32″N 81°59′55″W
- Area: 6.1 acres (2.5 ha)
- Built: 1936
- Architect: Scroggs & Ewing; Drummond, Edward Lynn
- Architectural style: Colonial Revival
- NRHP reference No.: 96001500
- Added to NRHP: December 30, 1996

Shiloh Orphanage, now the Shiloh Comprehensive Community Center, was an orphanage for black children in Augusta, Georgia, United States. The site includes the Strong Academy building, a girls' dormitory, and a boys' dormitory. The orphanage closed in 1970 and reopened in 1977 as the Shiloh Comprehensive Community Center. The site was listed on the National Register of Historic Places on December 30, 1996. It is located at 1635 15th Street.

The orphanage was established in 1902 by the Shiloh Baptist Association. Land for the orphanage was purchased in 1904 near the historically black community of Bethlehem. Strong Academy, a one-room school for young children, was built in 1910; the girls' dormitory was designed by Scroggs and Ewing and completed in 1927; and the Edward Lynn Drummond-designed boys' dormitory was constructed in 1936. The grounds included a vegetable garden and a grazing area for cattle.

== See also ==
- National Register of Historic Places listings in Richmond County, Georgia
