= Meadow Garden (Augusta, Georgia) =

- George Walton House
- U.S. National Register of Historic Places
- U.S. National Historic Landmark
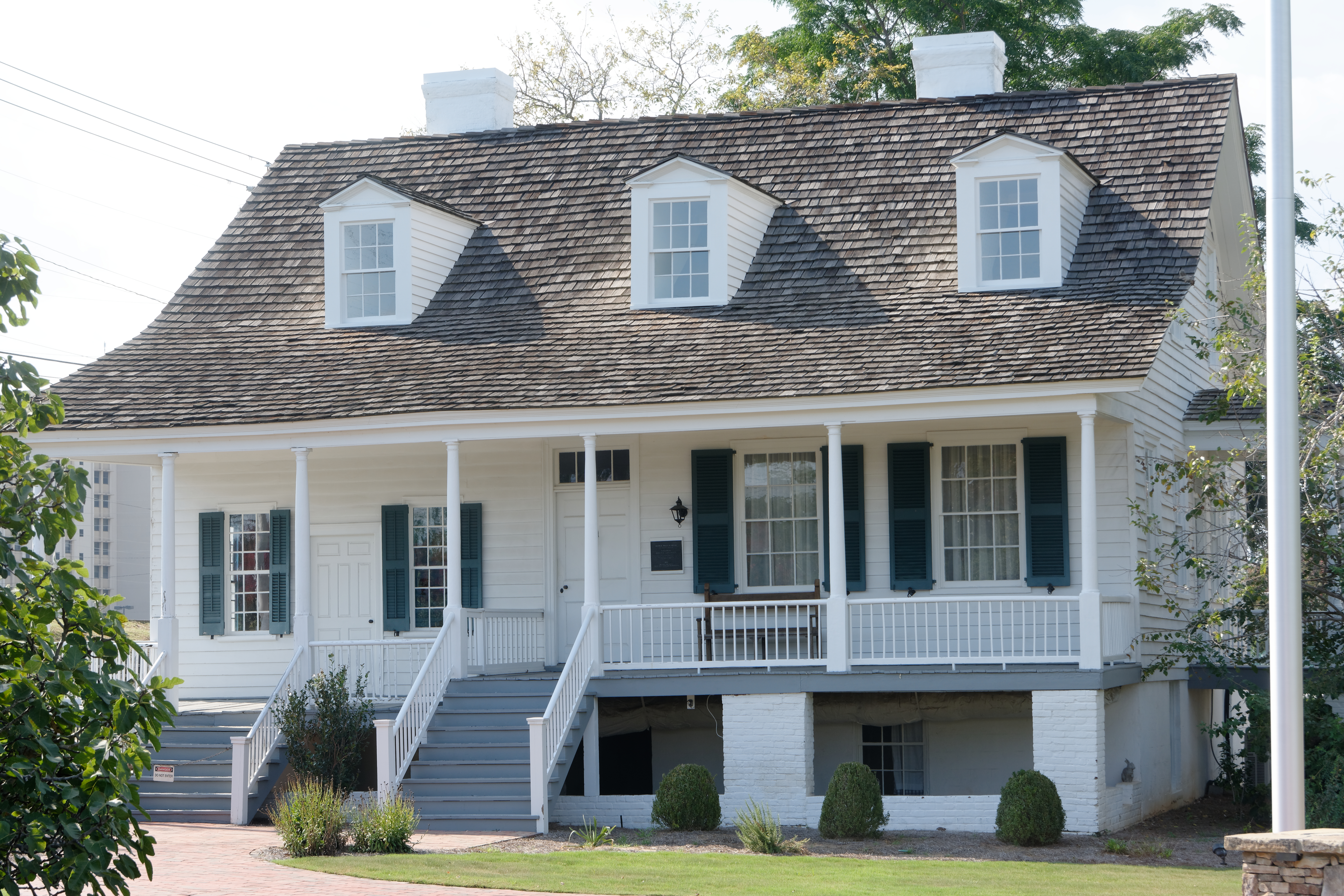
- Meadow Garden, 2017

- Location within Georgia Location within the United States
- Location: 1320 Independence Drive, Augusta, Georgia, 30901
- Coordinates: 33.47376°N 81.97979°W
- Area: 0.4 acres (0.16 ha)
- Built: 1794
- NRHP reference No.: 76000646

Significant dates
- Added to NRHP: July 19, 1976
- Designated NHL: December 21, 1981

Meadow Garden is a historic house museum at 1320 Independence Drive in Augusta, Georgia. It was a home of Founding Father George Walton (1749–1804), one of Georgia's three signers of the U.S. Declaration of Independence. Walton was later elected governor of Georgia and also served as a United States senator. Meadow Garden was saved by the Daughters of the American Revolution, who established it as a museum in 1901. The house was declared a National Historic Landmark in 1981.

== Description and history ==
Meadow Garden is located on the west side of downtown Augusta, separated from the Augusta Canal by the Augusta Canal Historic Walking Trail, and just east of the Sutherland Mill. It is a 1 1/2-story wood-frame structure, set on a high brick basement. It was built in stages, originally three bays in width, but is now six, with three gabled dormers and two chimneys projecting from the gabled roof. A shed-roof porch extends across the front, supported by slender Doric columns. The facade is irregularly arranged, with two doors and four windows.

It is a Sand Hills cottage.

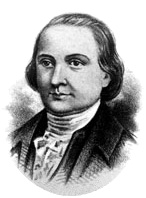
George Walton

The oldest portion of the house, its right three bays, was built in 1791. The left three bays were added sometime after 1800, and the front porch was also probably added at a later date. Although the property was never owned by him, it was from 1791 to his death in 1804 the home of George Walton, a signer of the United States Declaration of Independence. Trained as a lawyer, he served in the Continental Congress (1776–1781) and in the Georgia militia, in whose service he was captured by the British during the 1778 Capture of Savannah. Exchanged and released, he was soon afterward elected Governor of Georgia, an office he held from November 1779 to January 1780. He also served as the state's Chief Justice, and in a second term as Governor 1789–80. He died at College Hill, his country house, in 1804. The house passed out of the Walton family in 1812, and is now owned and operated as a museum by the local chapter of the Daughters of the American Revolution.

It was documented by the Historic American Buildings Survey in 1934-35. It was listed on the National Register of Historic Places in 1976, and further was promoted to a National Historic Landmark in 1981.

== See also ==
- List of National Historic Landmarks in Georgia (U.S. state)
- National Register of Historic Places listings in Richmond County, Georgia
