= Seclusaval and Windsor Spring =

- U.S. National Register of Historic Places
- U.S. Historic district
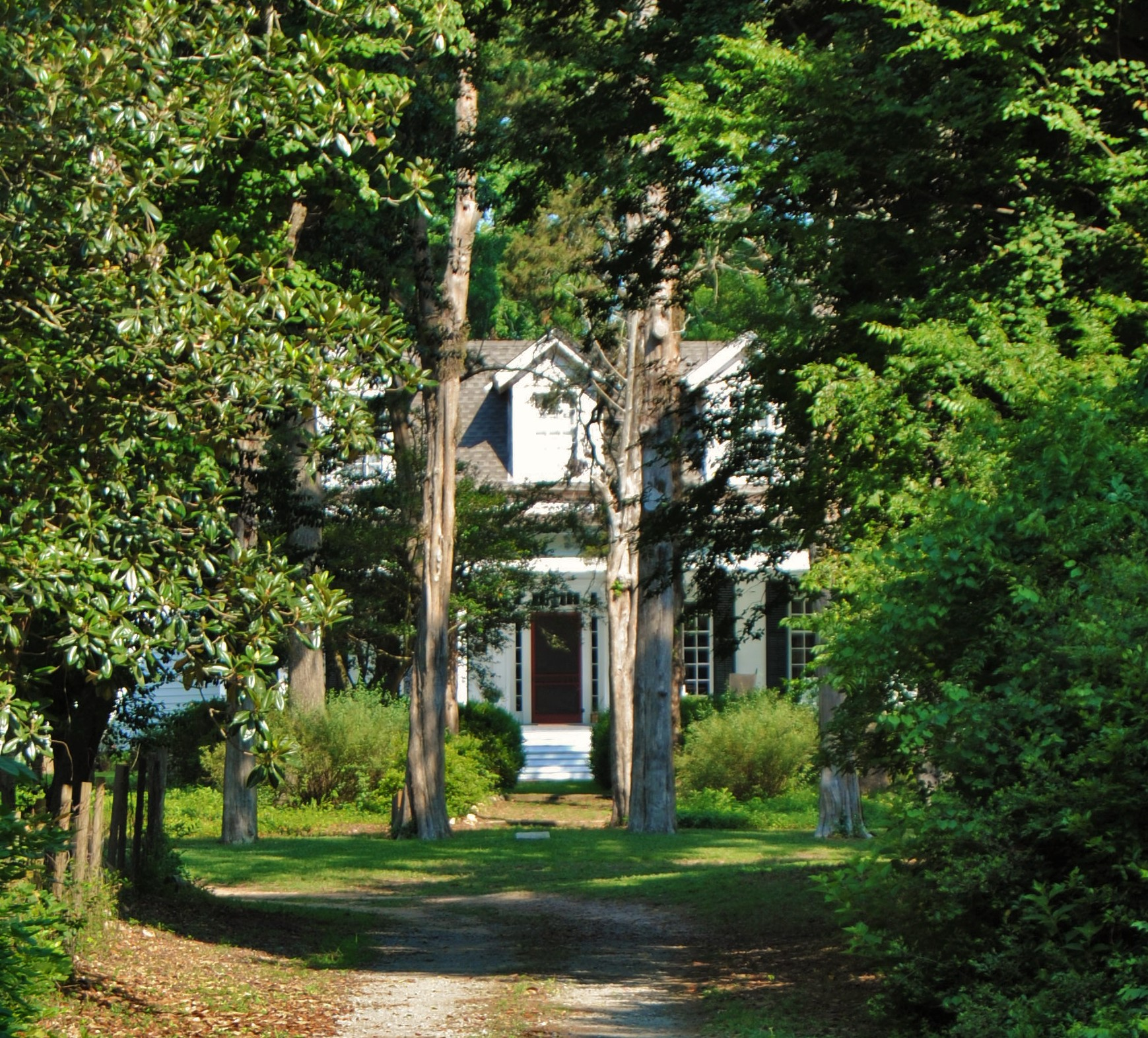
- Seclusaval, a Sand Hills-type cottage

- Location within Georgia Location within the United States
- Location: Junction of Windsor Spring Road and Tobacco Road, Augusta, Georgia
- Coordinates: 33°23′5″N 82°4′21″W
- Built: 1843
- Architectural style: Greek Revival
- NRHP reference No.: 87001331
- Added to NRHP: October 11, 1988

Seclusaval and Windsor Spring is a historic property in Richmond County, Georgia that includes a Greek Revival building built in 1843.

It was deemed notable historically in several ways:

- for its association with the historic Windsor Spring Water Company that sold water from the spring on the property
- for having a short but intact part of historic Tobacco Road, a road which connected Savannah River docks to the big tobacco plantations of the county. Tobacco was brought to the river in hogsheads drawn by mules. This road section was never paved.
- for being the nucleus of a settlement of relatives of Valentine Walker, a settlement that might have been the basis for a town or city, but which remained a small family settlement.

It is also significant for the architecture of the main house on the property, Seclusaval, which is a "Sand Hills-type cottage". Sand Hills-type cottage architecture is a local, modified form of Greek Revival architecture. The form has symmetry, wide entablatures, and classic columns of the Greek Revival style. And the front doorway of the house has a rectangular transom with side lights, also consistent with Greek Revival style. But it also has a "one-story, high-pitched side gable roof, three gable dormers, and a full-facade porch" that characterize the Sand Hills variation. Seclusaval is "an excellent example" of this type.

The property has eight contributing buildings and two other contributing structures (a spring house and a pavilion). The buildings are the main house, a slave cabin, a playhouse, a well house, a privy, a pantry, a smoke house, and a barn.

The property was listed on the National Register of Historic Places in 1988.

== See also ==
- Sandhills (Carolina), about the North and South Carolina sand hills, perhaps similar to the Sand Hills of this area
