= Bath Presbyterian Church and Cemetery =

Historic site in Richmond County, Georgia, US

- U.S. National Register of Historic Places
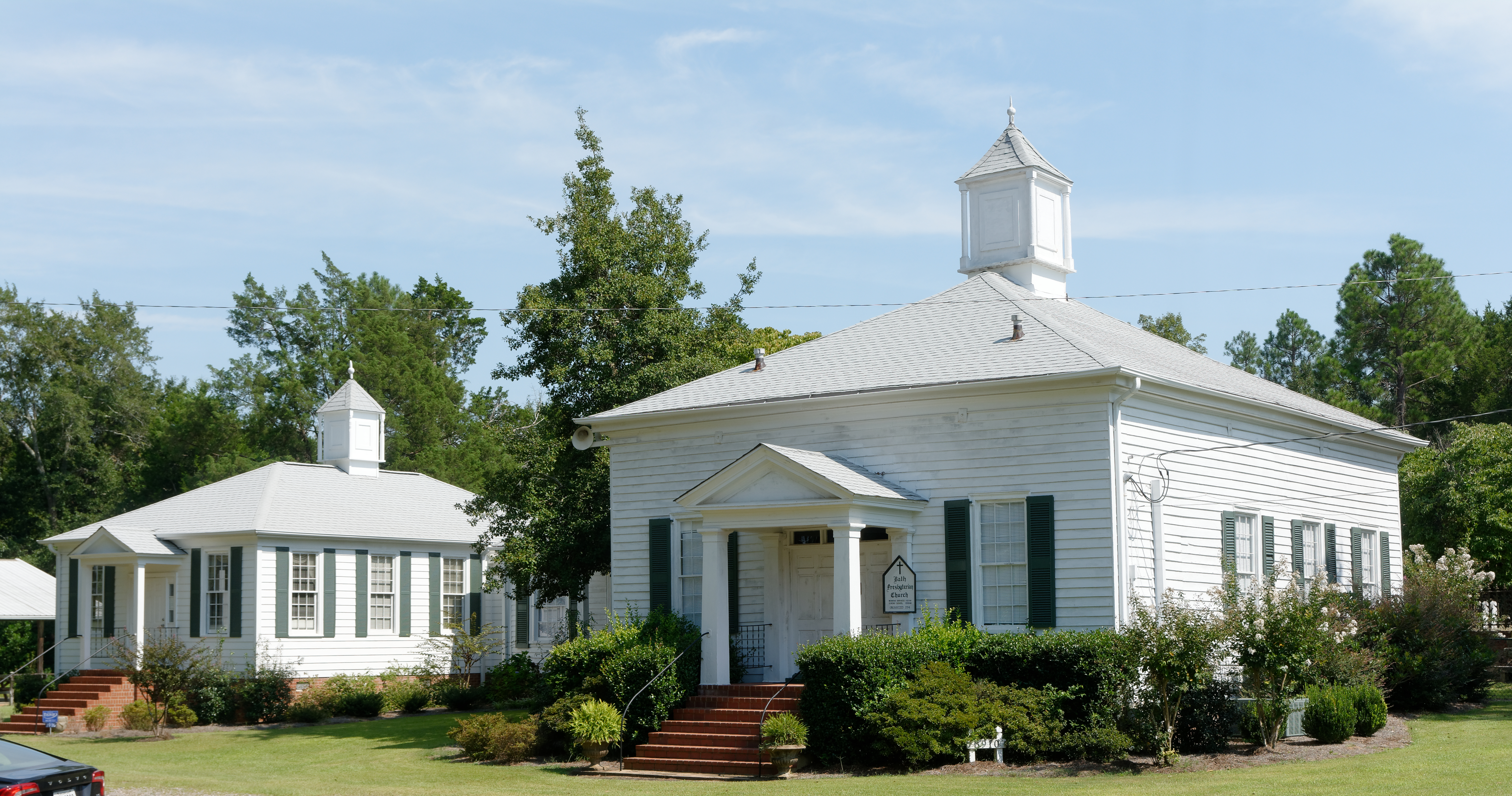
- Church on the right (1836); fellowship hall on the left (1991)

- Location within Georgia Location within the United States
- Nearest city: Blythe, Georgia
- Coordinates: 33.33641°N 82.1728°W
- Area: 4.6 acres (1.9 ha)
- Built: 1814
- Architect: Trowbridge, John
- Architectural style: Rural antebellum church
- NRHP reference No.: 04001179
- Added to NRHP: October 27, 2004

Bath Presbyterian Church and Cemetery is a historic church in Blythe, Georgia.

The current sanctuary was built in 1836 and was added to the National Register of Historic Places in 2004.

It has a Greek Revival Sunday School wing.
