= Woodrow Wilson Boyhood Home =

Historic house in Georgia, United States

- U.S. National Register of Historic Places
- U.S. National Historic Landmark
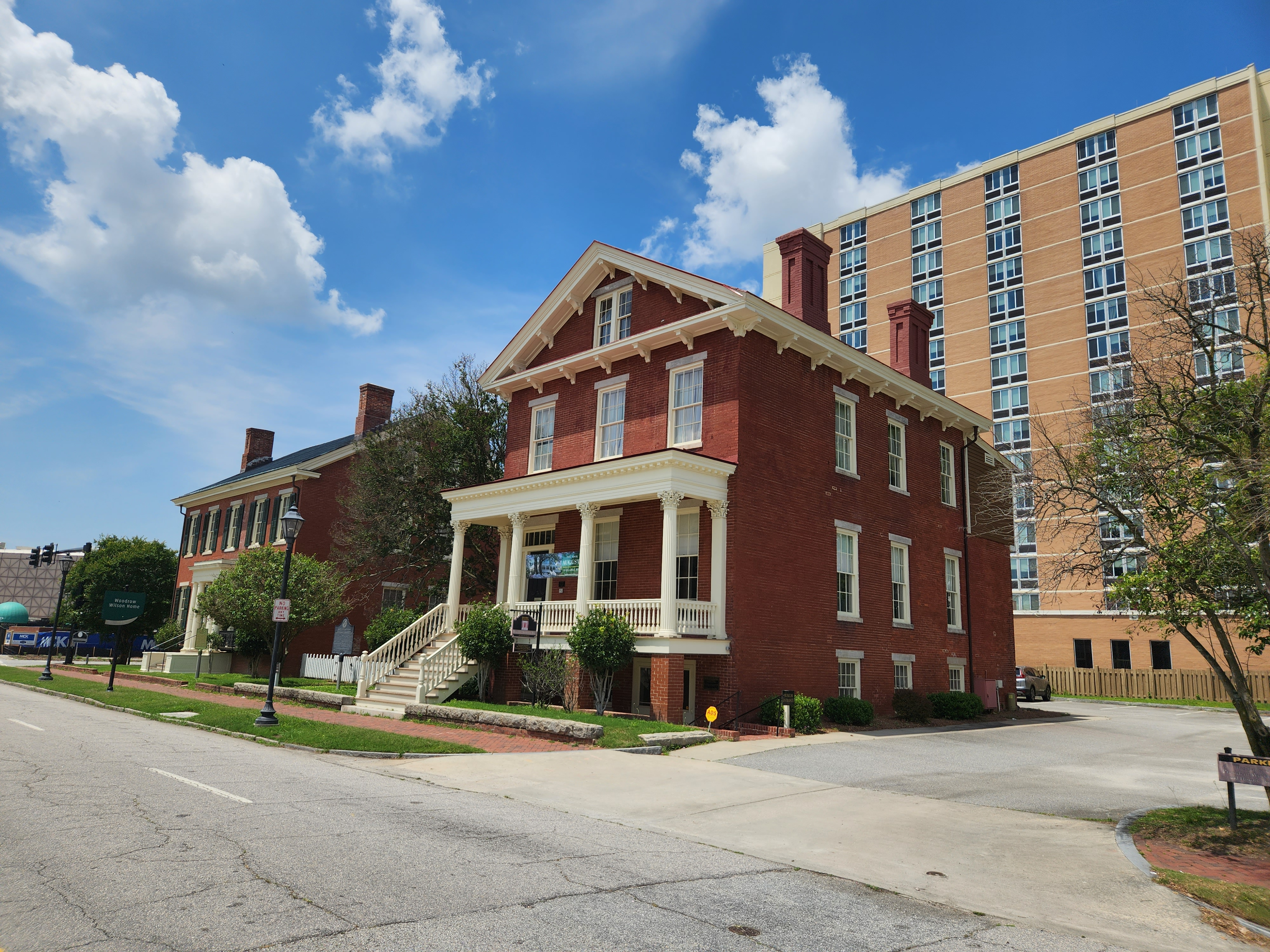
- Woodrow Wilson Boyhood Home in 2023

- Location within Georgia Location within the United States
- Location: 419 7th Street, Augusta, Georgia
- Coordinates: 33.47167°N 81.96505°W
- Area: less than one acre
- Built: 1840
- NRHP reference No.: 79000746

Significant dates
- Added to NRHP: February 28, 1979
- Designated NHL: October 6, 2008

The Woodrow Wilson Boyhood Home is a historic house museum at 419 7th Street in Augusta, Georgia. Built in 1859, it was a childhood home of Woodrow Wilson (1856–1924), the 28th president of the United States and proponent of the League of Nations. The house is owned and operated by Historic Augusta, Inc., and was designated a National Historic Landmark on October 6, 2008.

== Description and history ==
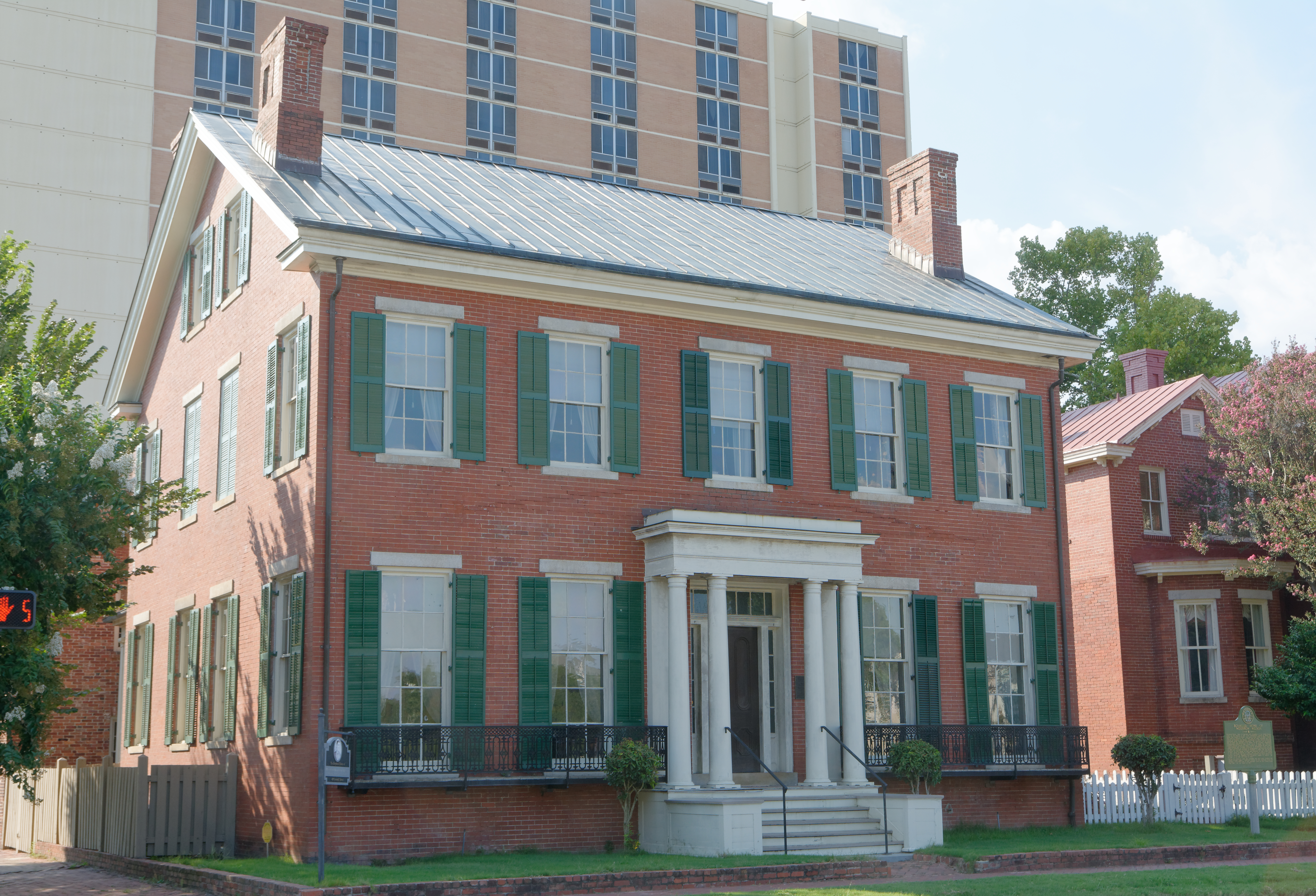
The house in 2017

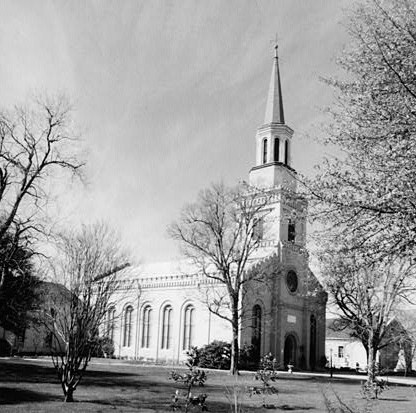
First Presbyterian Church, of Augusta, diagonally across, where Wilson's father preached

The Wilson Boyhood Home is located in downtown Augusta, at the northern corner of Telfair and 7th Streets. It stands adjacent to the Joseph R. Lamar Boyhood Home, which now serves as the visitors center for the house, and diagonally across the street corner from the First Presbyterian Church, for which it served as a manse. It is a two-story brick structure, with a side gable roof, five-bay front facade, and a pair of end chimneys. Located behind the house are a service building and carriage house, built about the same time of the house, also out of load-bearing brick. The main facade has a center entrance, sheltered by a portico supported by paired Tuscan columns. The entry is framed by sidelight windows and topped by a transom window. The interior has been restored to a c. 1860 appearance, and is decorated with period furnishings and Wilson memorabilia. One of the bedroom windows has the name "Tom" etched in it; this is believed to have been made by Wilson, whose first name was Thomas, and he was called "Tom" or "Tommy" as a child.

The house was built and occupied by the Wilsons in 1859. Until 1872 it was the home of Dr. Joseph Ruggles Wilson, pastor of the First Presbyterian Church, and his family, which included his son Thomas, born 1856 in Virginia. The younger Wilson spent his formative years here, experiencing the American Civil War and the Reconstruction Era that followed. Wilson, later U.S. president from 1913 to 1921, was profoundly affected by these experiences.

The property remained the manse of the church, housing its ministers, until 1929, by which time the building had undergone a number of alterations and modernizing updates, but was in poor condition. After passing through a number of owners and uses, the property was purchased at auction by Historic Augusta in 1991, which then spent 10 years painstakingly restoring it to its 1860 appearance. It was opened as a house museum in 2001.

== See also ==
- Woodrow Wilson Birthplace and Presidential Library, Staunton, Virginia
- Woodrow Wilson House (Washington, D.C.)
- Presidential memorials in the United States
- List of residences of presidents of the United States
- List of National Historic Landmarks in Georgia (U.S. state)
- National Register of Historic Places listings in Richmond County, Georgia
