= Gertrude Herbert Institute of Art =

Art institute in Augusta, Georgia, United States

- Gertrude Herbert Art Institute
- U.S. National Register of Historic Places
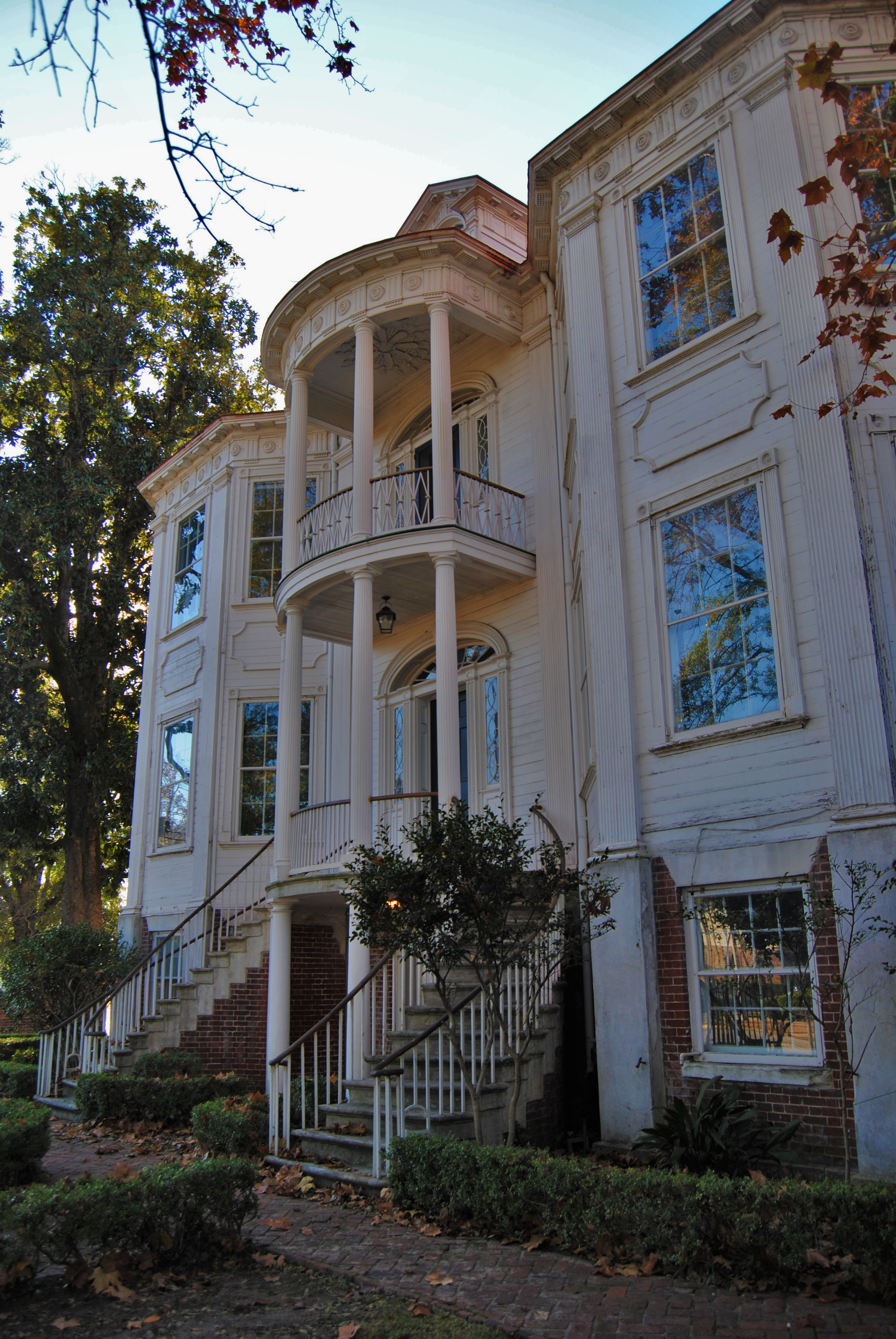

- Location within Georgia Location within the United States
- Location: 506 Telfair St., Augusta, Georgia
- Coordinates: 33°28′11″N 81°57′40″W
- Built: 1818
- Architectural style: Federal
- NRHP reference No.: 73000641
- Added to NRHP: March 20, 1973

Gertrude Herbert Institute of Art is located in Augusta, Georgia, in the home of former Augusta mayor and United States senator Nicholas Ware. Olivia Herbert founded the institute in 1937. The original name for the institute was the Augusta Art Club; it was later renamed in memorial to Olivia Herbert's daughter, Gertrude Herbert Dunn. The two primary missions of the institute are art education and visual arts exhibition.

== Education activity ==
Facilitating the art education mission of the institute is a certification by the Georgia Council of Arts as a Teacher Professional Learning (TPL) provider current as of 2007. Among other certified providers is Emory University.

== Ware's Folly: The building housing the institute ==
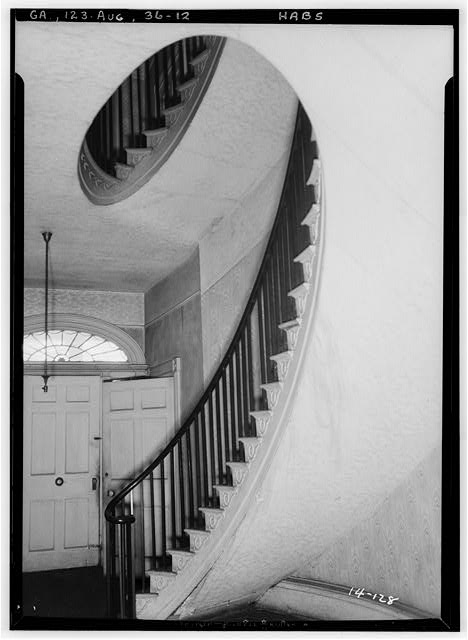
Foot of Stairs, Ware-Sibley-Clark House, 506 Telfair Street, Augusta, Richmond County, GA

The institute is located in a home that was built in 1818. The building is now listed on the National Register of Historic Places. Built in the Federal style the house is notable for its three-story elliptical staircase. The building bears the nickname Ware's Folly, which derives from the high cost of the construction, $40,000 in 1818 or c. $12 million in 2007, and the extravagant interior detailing.
