= Brahe House =

Historic house in Georgia, United States

- U.S. National Register of Historic Places
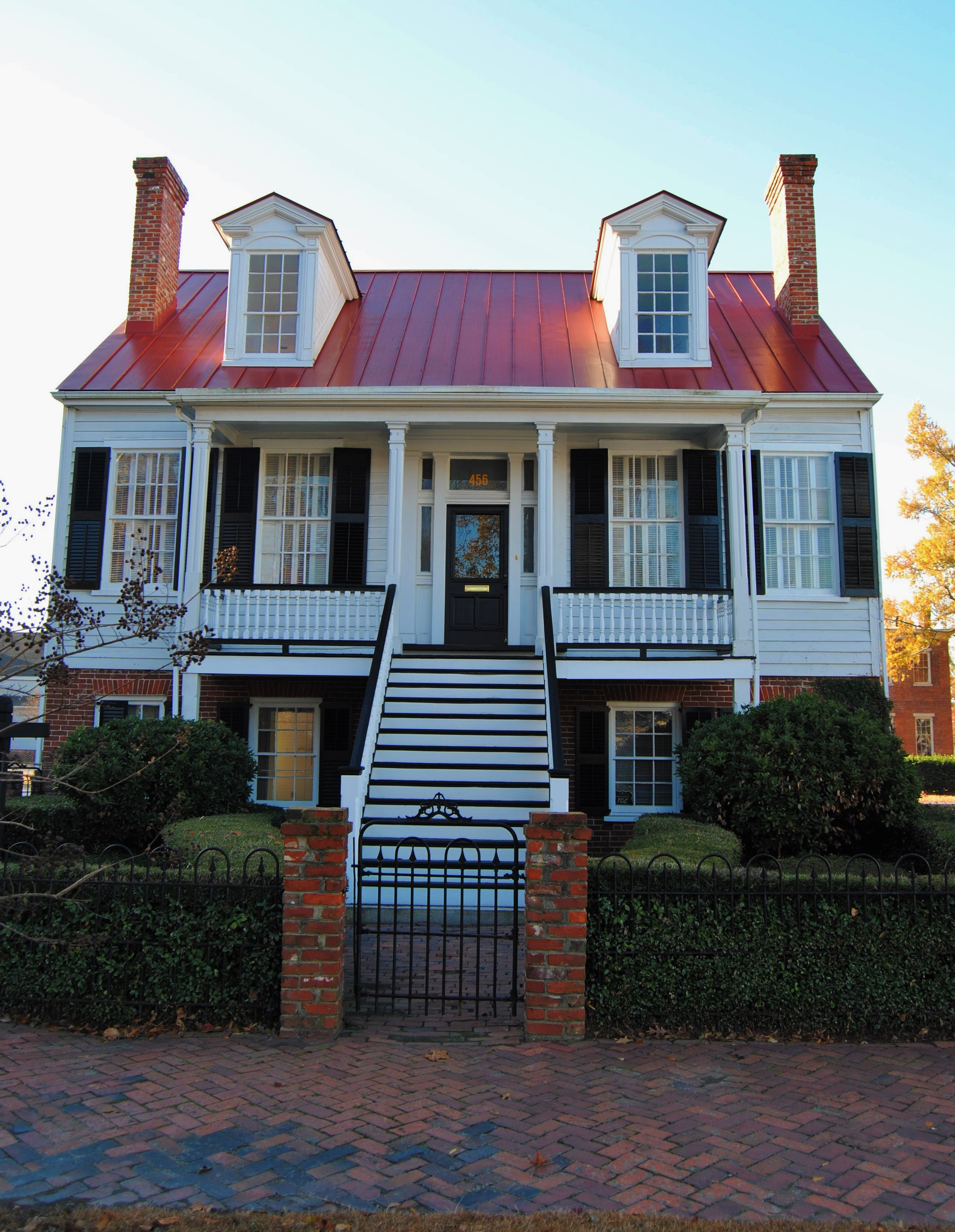

- Location within Georgia
- Location: 456 Telfair St., Augusta, Georgia
- Coordinates: 33°28′9″N 81°57′37″W
- Area: less than one acre
- Built: 1850
- Architectural style: Greek Revival
- NRHP reference No.: 73000640
- Added to NRHP: April 11, 1973

The Brahe House, located at 456 Telfair St. in Augusta, Georgia, was built in 1850. It was listed on the National Register of Historic Places in 1973.

It is a three-story cottage built by/for Frederick Adolphus Brahe. It is "a unique structure to this part of town" in that it reflects Sand Hills Cottage architecture with Greek Revival style while having a "full English basement".
