= First Presbyterian Church (Augusta, Georgia) =

Historic church in Georgia, United States

- First Presbyterian Church of Augusta
- U.S. National Register of Historic Places
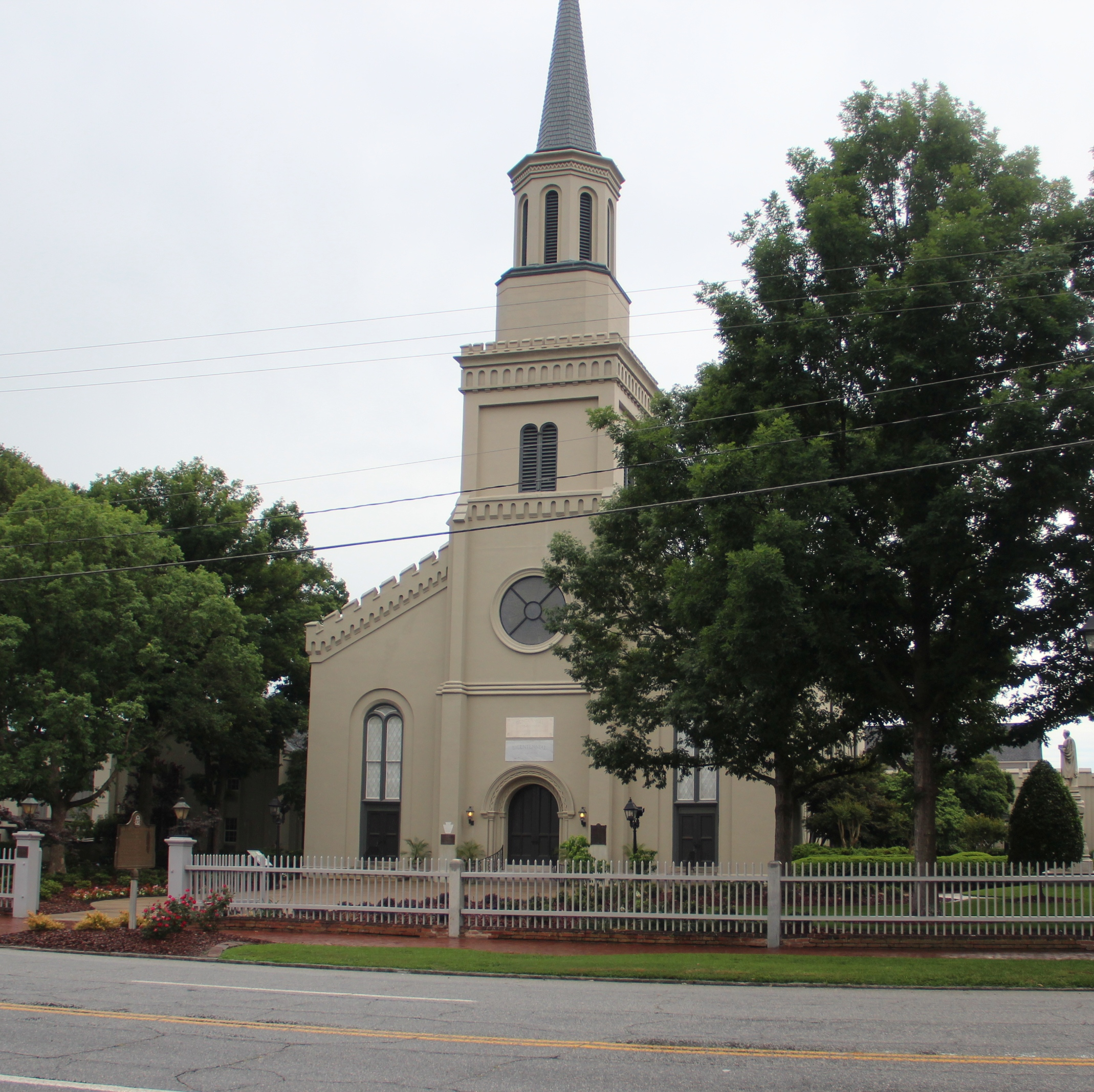
- First Presbyterian Church in 2017

- Location within Georgia Location within the United States
- Location: 642 Telfair Street, Augusta, Georgia
- Coordinates: 33°28′13″N 81°57′54″W
- Built: 1812
- Architect: Robert Mills
- Architectural style: Romanesque Revival
- NRHP reference No.: 97000100
- Added to NRHP: February 21, 1997

First Presbyterian Church is a historic Presbyterian church located at 642 Telfair Street in Augusta, Georgia in the United States.

== History ==
The church was established in 1804, and the building was completed in 1812. In 1808, while the congregation was still holding services at St. Paul's Episcopal Church, members helped start a church in Smyrna in Wilkes County. In 1925 the Ladies' Foreign Missionary Society already was collecting donations, making it the first such ministry in the world, according to the statistics of the church. During his childhood, United States president Woodrow Wilson's father, Joseph R. Wilson, was minister at First Presbyterian from 1858 to 1870. The Woodrow Wilson Boyhood Home is a historic site nearby. In 1861 the Church hosted the first General Assembly of the Presbyterian Church in the Confederate States and the first minister in this new denomination was President Wilson's father. During the Civil War the building was used as a hospital for men wounded, and the churchyard was a detention camp for Union prisoners in the Battle of Chickamauga. Men who died were buried in the Magnolia Cemetery. During this time Joseph Wilson was called to the chaplain ministry in the army, and in 1870 Wilson was called to serve at a seminary in South Carolina.

Westminster Schools of Augusta was started in 1972. The campus of Westminster Schools, located on Wheeler Road, now has more than 500 pupils, grades K–4 through 12. First Presbyterian Church started a missions conference, and the annual event is a combination retreat and workshop for missionaries and their families. It also is an opportunity for the people of Augusta to hear about work in the field.

In 1973, First Presbyterian dropped its affiliation with the Southern Presbyterian Church over issues such as the authority of scripture and the role of women in the church, and became independent. It aligned itself with the Presbyterian Church in America in 1977.

== Church building ==
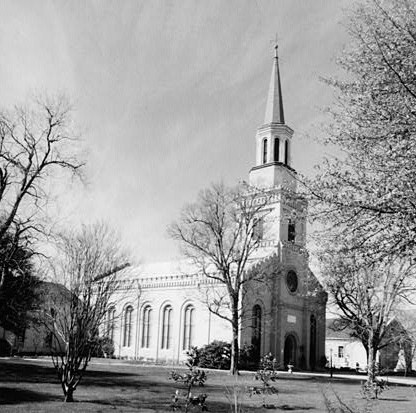
An old picture from the congregation

Later the church served as a center of social and religious activities during World War I and World War II.

It was designed by architect Robert Mills in the Romanesque style. Mills was also Presbyterian, and was an elder in the First Presbyterian Church in Columbia, SC. The church sanctuary was built in 1809–12. The church was finished and dedicated in 1812 in Classical style. The church was significantly changed in 1847 to incorporate Romanesque round-arched windows and doors and crenellated parapet walls. Mills' design, however, is still evident in the shape and scale of the historic building. A plaque marks the Wilson pew in the sanctuary. A letter signed by President Wilson and some furniture used by his family when they lived in the manse were installed in a classroom. Four halls on the sides and rear of the sanctuary were added to the building from 1951 to 1978. On February 21, 1997, it was added to the National Register of Historic Places, listed as First Presbyterian Church of Augusta. The church celebrated its 200th anniversary in 2004

== Doctrine ==
First Presbyterian Church is a member congregation of the Presbyterian Church in America.

It adheres to the Westminster Confession of Faith, Westminster Shorter Cathechism and Westminster Larger Catechism.

The church has about 1,900 members.

The lead pastor is Dr. Michael K. Hearon.
