= United States Post Office and Courthouse (Augusta, Georgia) =

- U.S. National Register of Historic Places
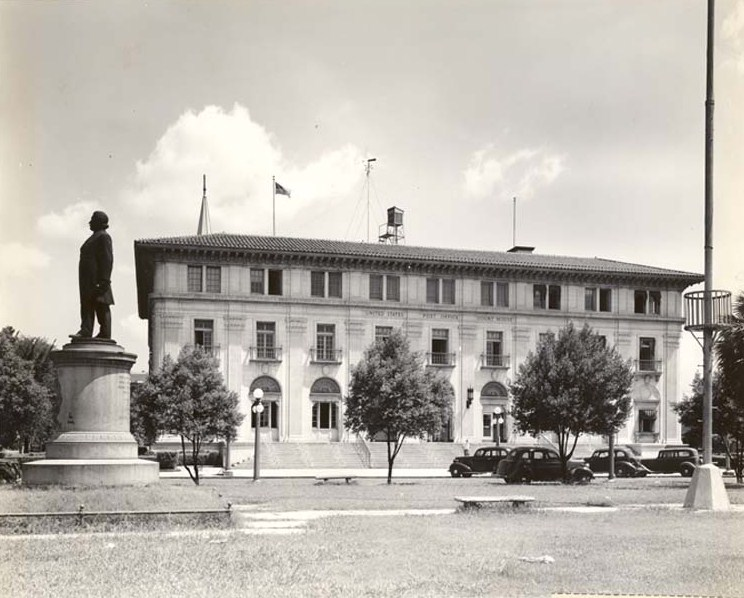

- Location within Georgia Location within the United States
- Location: 500 E. Ford St., Augusta, Georgia
- Coordinates: 33°28′20″N 81°58′3″W
- Area: 1 acre (0.40 ha)
- Built: 1915-16, 1936, 1960, 1971, 1992-96
- Architect: Oscar Wenderoth
- Architectural style: Renaissance
- NRHP reference No.: 99001648
- Added to NRHP: January 21, 2000

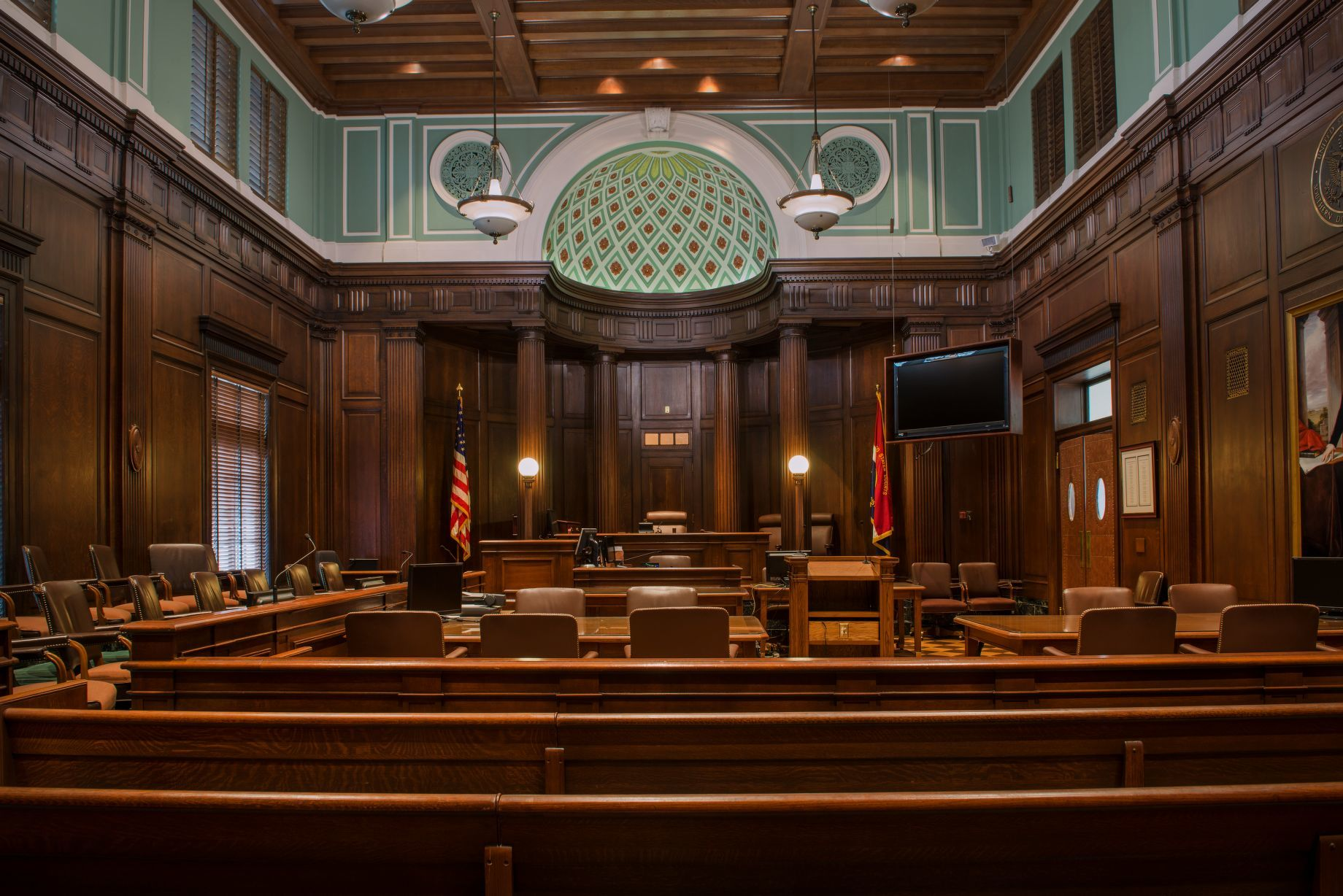
Courtroom located inside the United States Courthouse

The United States Post Office and Courthouse in Augusta, Georgia is a U-shaped building that was built during 1915-16 as a post office and courthouse, with elements of Italian Renaissance Revival architecture including creamy marble walls and a red mission tile roof. Design credit is to U.S. Supervising Architect Oscar Wenderoth. The building was extended to the rear in 1936, and received interior modernizations in 1960 and 1971. It was vacated and extensively rehabilitated during 1992–96.

Also known as United States Courthouse, it was listed on the National Register of Historic Places in 2000. It was deemed significant architecturally as an excellent example of Italian Renaissance Revival style, and historically as a symbol of Federal government presence in Augusta.

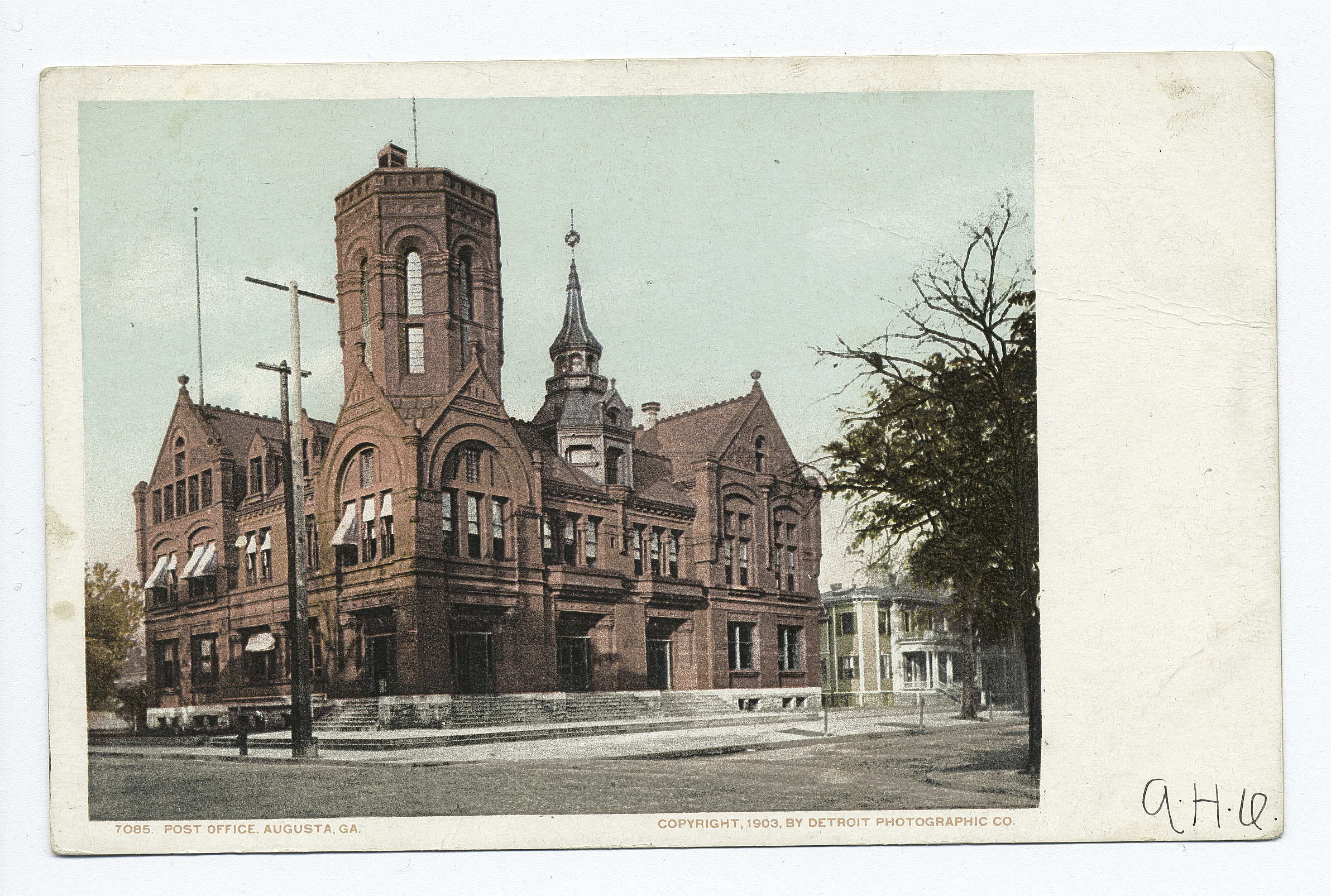
Earlier post office in 1903

== See also ==
- List of United States post offices
